= Church of Our Most Holy Redeemer and St Thomas More, Chelsea =

Coordinates: 51.4845°N 0.1699°W

Church of Our Most Holy Redeemer and St Thomas More
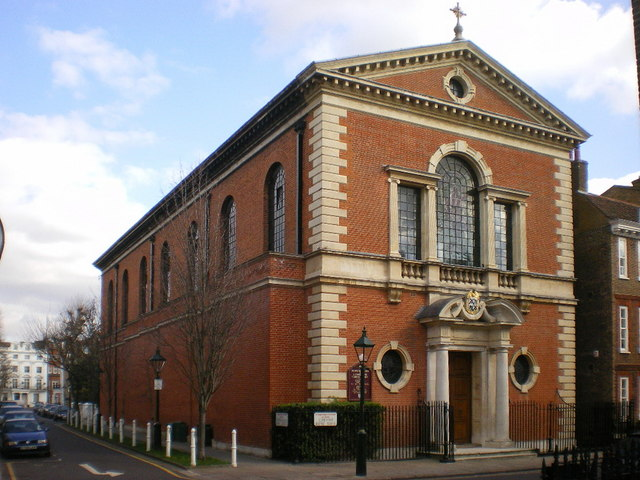
- View from corner of Upper Cheyne Row and Cheyne Row

- Location in Kensington and Chelsea
- Location: Chelsea, London
- Country: England
- Denomination: Roman Catholic
- Website: HolyRedeemerChelsea.co.uk

History
- Status: Parish church
- Dedication: Christ the Redeemer; Thomas More
- Consecrated: 21 June 1905

Architecture
- Functional status: Active
- Heritage designation: Grade II listed
- Designated: 7 November 1984
- Architect: Edward Goldie
- Style: Renaissance Revival
- Groundbreaking: 7 June 1894
- Completed: 23 October 1895

Administration
- Province: Westminster
- Archdiocese: Westminster
- Deanery: Kensington and Chelsea

The Church of Our Most Holy Redeemer and St Thomas More, also referred to as Holy Redeemer Church, is a Roman Catholic Parish church in Chelsea, London. it was built in the 19th century and opened on 23 October 1895. It was designed by Edward Goldie. It is situated on the corner of Upper Cheyne Row and Cheyne Row, next to Carlyle's House in the Royal Borough of Kensington and Chelsea. It is listed Grade II on the National Heritage List for England.

== History ==
=== Construction ===
In the early 1890s, Cardinal Herbert Vaughan requested Canon Cornelius James Keens to go to Chelsea and create a mission to serve the local Catholic population. In 1886, a site was acquired in Beaufort Street. In 1892 Canon Keens obtained permission from the Archdiocese of Westminster to build a church in the area, relocating from Beaufort Street to Cheyne Row, the site of William de Morgan's pottery. The foundation stone was laid on 7 June 1894 and the Church of Our Most Holy Redemmer was opened on 23 October 1895. The church was consecrated on 21 June 1905 by Cardinal Francis Bourne.

=== Renamed ===
The dedication of the church was changed in 1935 after Thomas More was canonised. It became the Church of the Most Holy Redeemer and St Thomas More.

=== Repair and renovation ===
In September 1940, during the Second World War, the church was damaged by a bomb which killed nineteen people. The west wall and organ were destroyed. After the war, the church was repaired.

In 1962, the restoration work was undertaken in the church. From 1970 to 1972, the church was reordered. The floor of the chancel was relaid, so that the altar could be brought towards the congregation and a marble ambo was installed. In 1980 a new font was also installed to match the ambo. The Stations of the Cross are by the Irish sculptor Ken Thompson, installed for the Millennium.

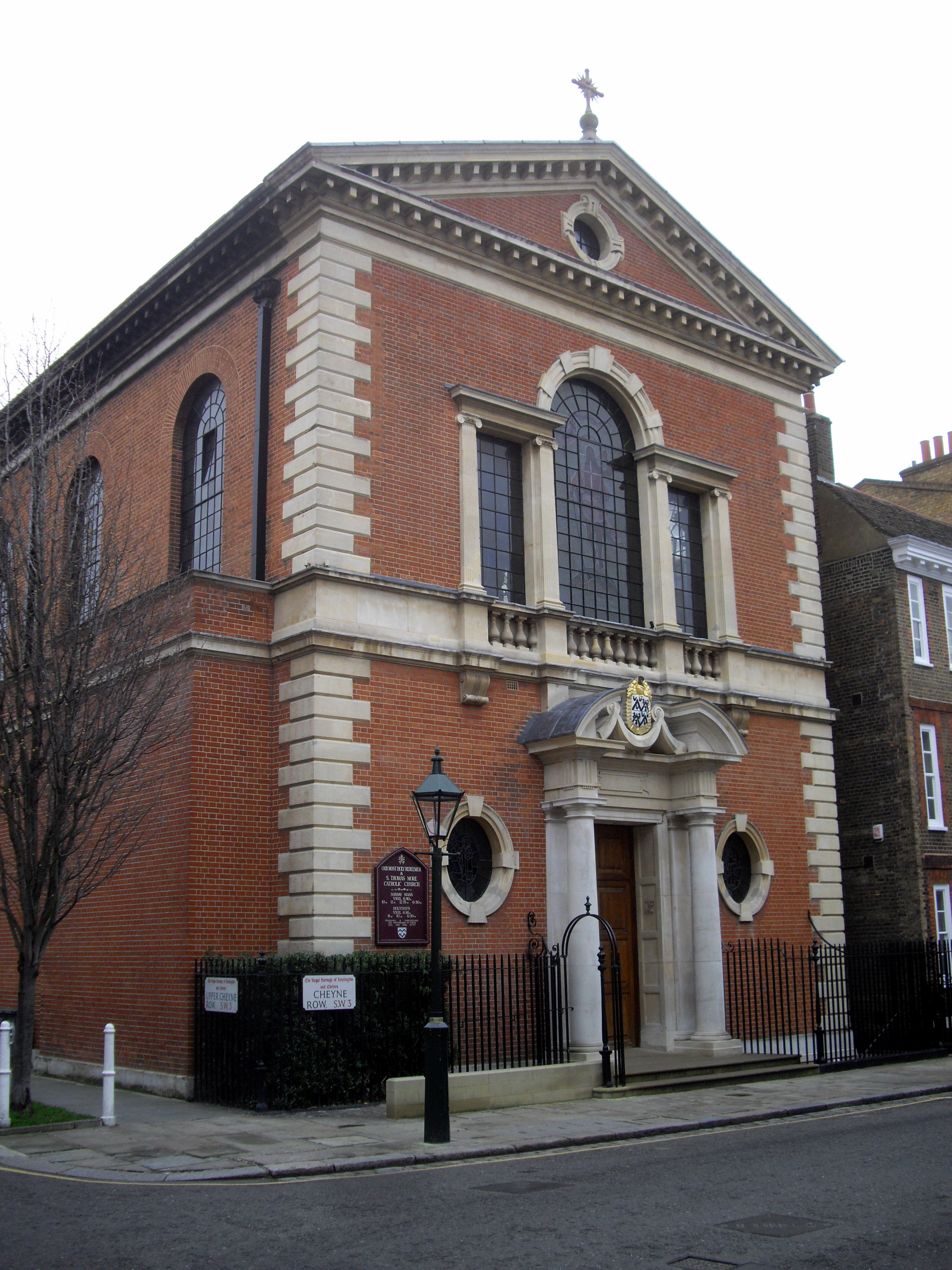
Cheyne Row

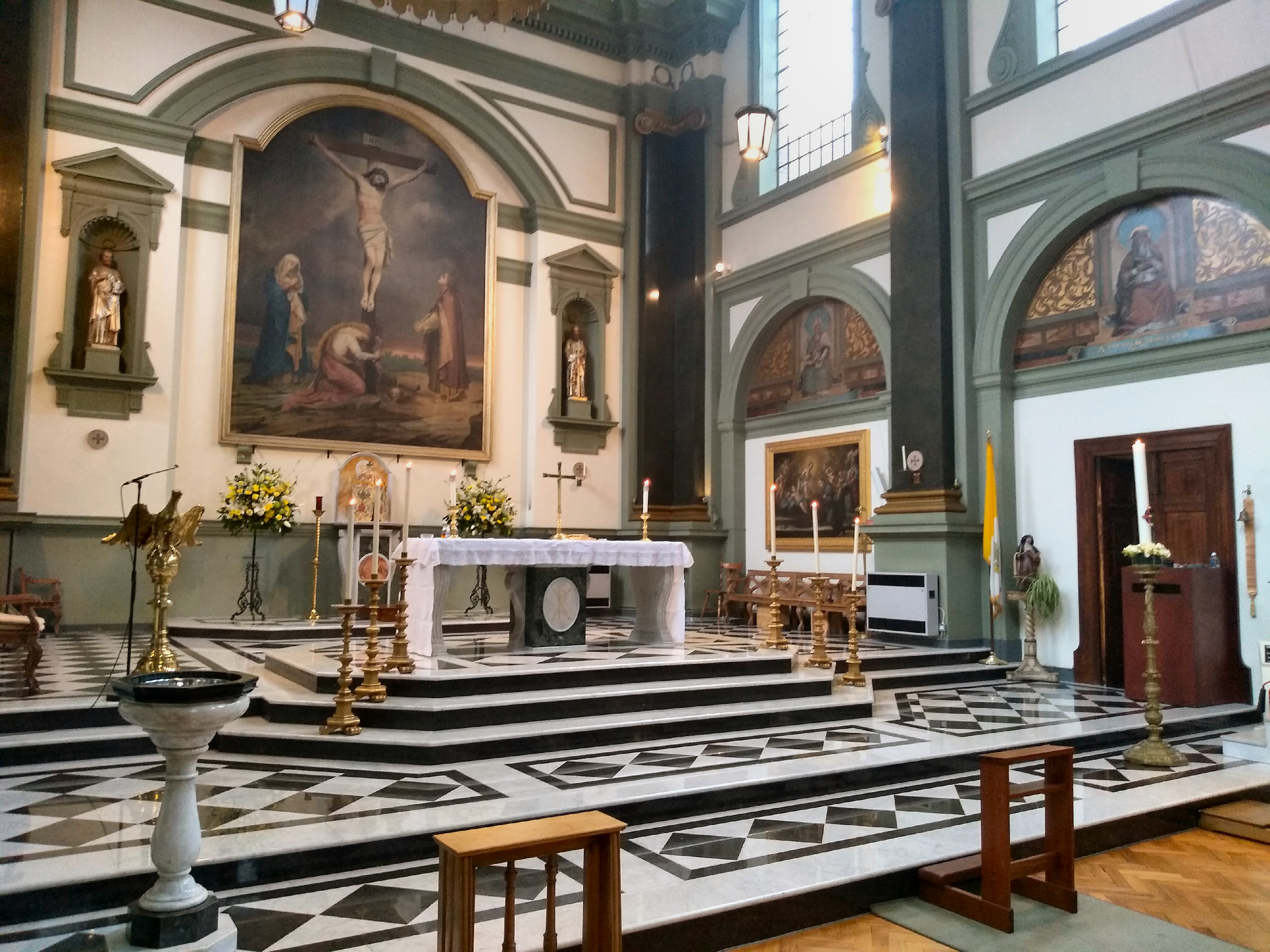
Sanctuary

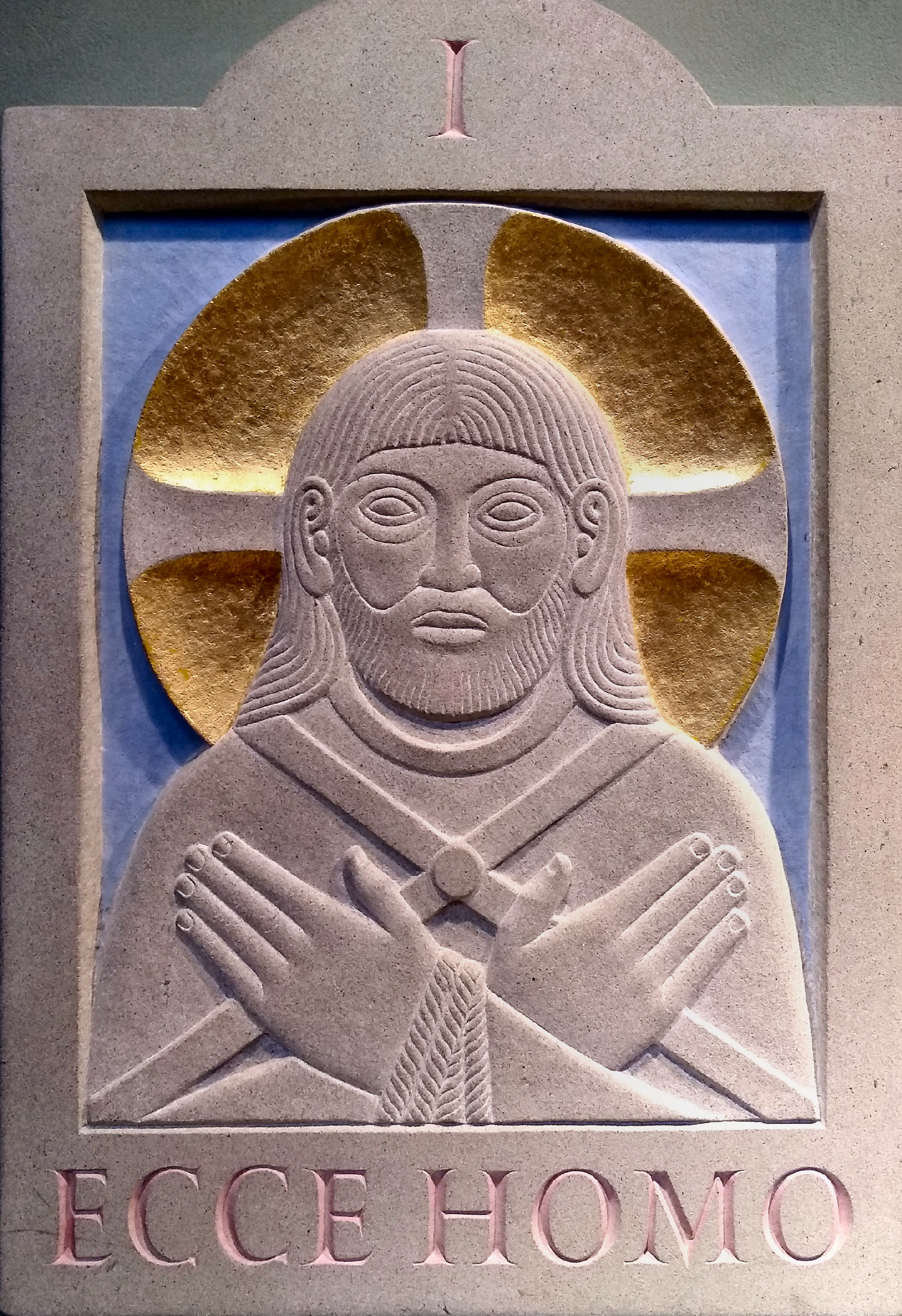
Stations of the Cross

== Weddings ==
- Sean and Eileen O'Casey on 23 September 1927
- David Bruce Huxley and Anna Remsen Schenk on 27 June 1939
- Anna del Conte and Oliver Waley on 5 October 1950
- Bernard and Gillian Cribbins on 27 August 1955
- Hugh James Arbuthnott to Vanessa Dyer in 1964
- Roderick Aeneas Chisholm to Phyllis Mary Sanchia Whitworth 5 September 1945

== Parish ==
The church has five Sunday Masses, at 6:30pm on Saturday, 10:00am and 11:00am on Sunday and 12:15pm and 6:30pm on Sunday. It also has weekday Masses at 8:00am from Monday to Friday.

== Exterior ==
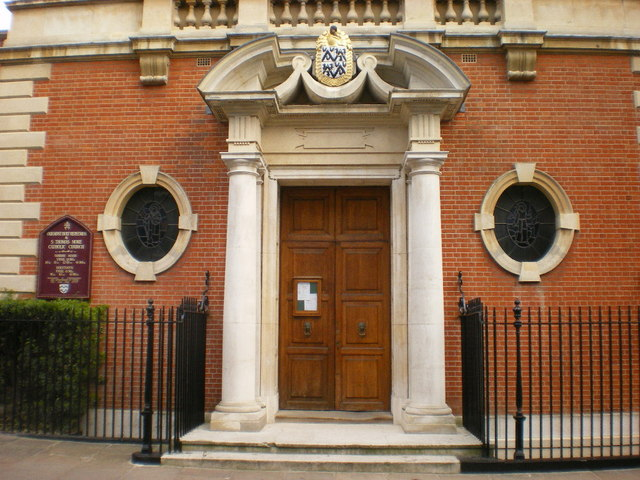
Church entrance

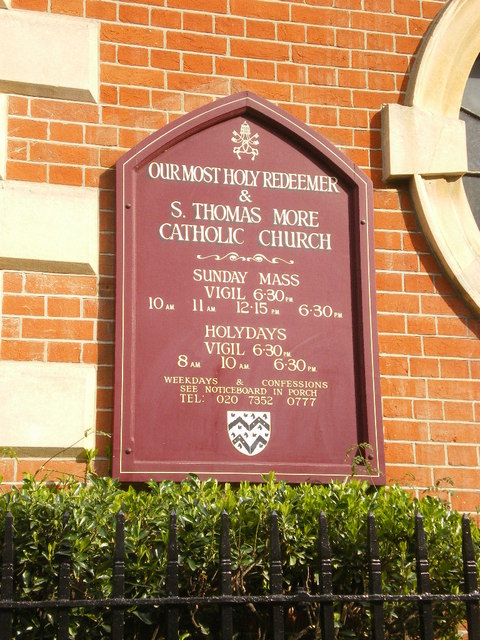
Church sign

== See also ==
- Allen Hall Seminary
- Redemptoris Mater House of Formation
