= James Curry (bishop) =

Bishop James Curry may refer to:

- James E. Curry (born 1948), American Episcopal Suffragan Bishop of Connecticut
- Jim Curry (bishop) (born 1960), British Roman Catholic Auxiliary Bishop in Westminster

== See also ==
- James Curry (disambiguation)
