= McAleenan =

McAleenan is a surname. Notable people with the surname include:

- Des McAleenan, Irish expatriate American soccer player and coach
- Kevin McAleenan (born 1971), American lawyer and government official
- Máirín McAleenan, camogie player
- Paul McAleenan (born 1951), Irish Roman Catholic bishop
