= Diocese of Westminster =

Diocese of Westminster may refer to:

- Roman Catholic Diocese of Westminster, since 1850, with seat at Westminster Cathedral
- Diocese of Westminster (Church of England), extant from 1540 to 1550, with seat at what is now Westminster Abbey
