= Redemptoris Mater House of Formation =

Coordinates: 51°31′24″N 0°9′54″W

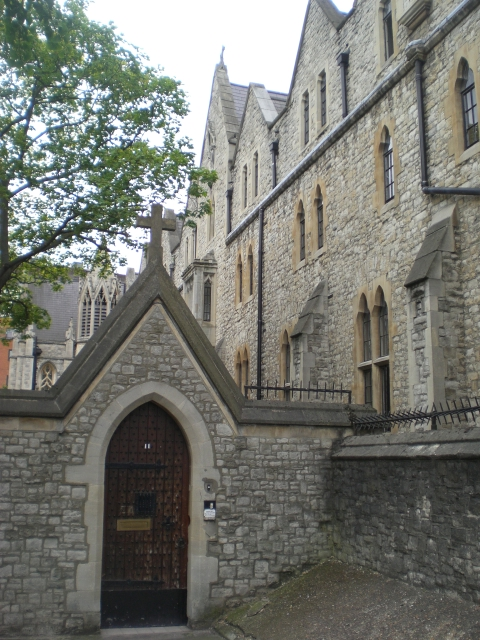
St Edwards Convent, Marylebone – now the home of Redemptoris Mater, London

The Redemptoris Mater House of Formation in London does not refer to a building but rather to a particular diocesan institution. It is a fruit of the Neocatechumenal Way in the service of forming men to become diocesan and missionary priests for the Roman Catholic Archdiocese of Westminster to serve the New Evangelization. It is part of the wider network of the Redemptoris Mater seminaries and the Neocatechumenal Way.

The Redemptoris Mater House of Formation in the Archdiocese of Westminster was established in 1991 by Cardinal Basil Hume and was officially established within the structure of the Diocesan Seminary, Allen Hall Seminary on 13 December 2013 with the public signing of its statute by the Archbishop of Westminster, Vincent Nichols.
The House of Formation is dependent on the Allen Hall seminary for academic and formal priestly training and upon the Neocatechumenal Way for spiritual and faith formation.

The first ordination from the House of Formation was to the deaconate (deacon) by Cardinal Basil Hume in November 1998 and later to the priesthood in July 1999 by Bishop Patrick O'Donoghue. As of 2021, 21 priests from the Redemptoris Mater House of Formation had been ordained for the Archdiocese of Westminster.

== Saint Edward's Convent ==
Saint Edward's Convent belongs to the Sisters of Mercy. The sisters have an office at the convent and give hospitality to the Redemptoris Mater House of Formation through a lease agreement. The building is the diocesan home of the seminarians who are being formed in the Redemptoris Mater House of Formation whilst they study at Allen Hall for the priesthood.

== Superiors ==
The Remptoris Mater House of Formation typically has a superior, appointed by the Intiators of the Way and approved by the Ordinary.
Fr Francesco Donega was the superior of the House of Formation from 1994 until 2017, leaving to be appointed as Vice-Rector and then Rector of Redemptoris Mater Rome. The current superior of the house is Fr Lorenzo Andreini, a priest of the Diocese of Westminster.
