= Catholic chaplaincies in England and Wales =

Below is a list of Catholic Chaplaincies in England and Wales:

== Latin-rite Catholic Chaplaincies ==
=== Airport Chaplaincies ===
- Birmingham Airport Chaplaincy
- Gatwick Airport Chaplaincy
- Heathrow Airport Chaplaincy
- Manchester Airport Chaplaincy
- Stansted Airport Chaplaincy

=== Armed Forces Chaplaincies ===
- Bishopric of the Forces

=== Chaplains to Foreign Communities (CECs) ===
- African Chaplaincy
- Asian Chaplaincy
- Austrian Chaplaincy
- Cantonese Chaplaincy
- Chinese Chaplaincy
- Croatian Chaplaincy
- Czech Chaplaincy
- Filipino Chaplaincy
- French parish
- German Chaplaincy
- Ghanaian Chaplaincy
- Hungarian Chaplaincy
- Irish Chaplaincy
- Italian Chaplaincy
- Latin American Chaplaincy
- Lithuanian Chaplaincy
- Maltese Chaplaincy
- Polish Catholic Mission
- Portuguese Chaplaincy
- Slovenian Chaplaincy
- Spanish Chaplaincy
- Tamil Chaplaincy
- Vietnamese Chaplaincy
- West Indian Chaplaincy

=== Higher Education Chaplaincies ===
There is an extensive network of Catholic Chaplains and Chaplaincies working within higher education in the UK. For more information see the website of the Conference of Catholic Chaplains in HE at http://www.ccche.org.uk/.

=== Port Chaplaincies ===
Apostleship of the Sea (Stella Maris)

== Eastern-rite Catholic Chaplaincies ==
=== Chaplains to Ethnic Communities (CECs) ===
- Chaldean Chaplaincy
- Maronite Chaplaincy
- Melkite Chaplaincy

=== Apostolic Exarchate ===
- Apostolic Exarchate for Ukrainians
