= Peter Elliott (bishop) =

Australian Roman Catholic bishop (1943–2025)

The Most Reverend Peter Elliott
- Auxiliary Bishop of Melbourne
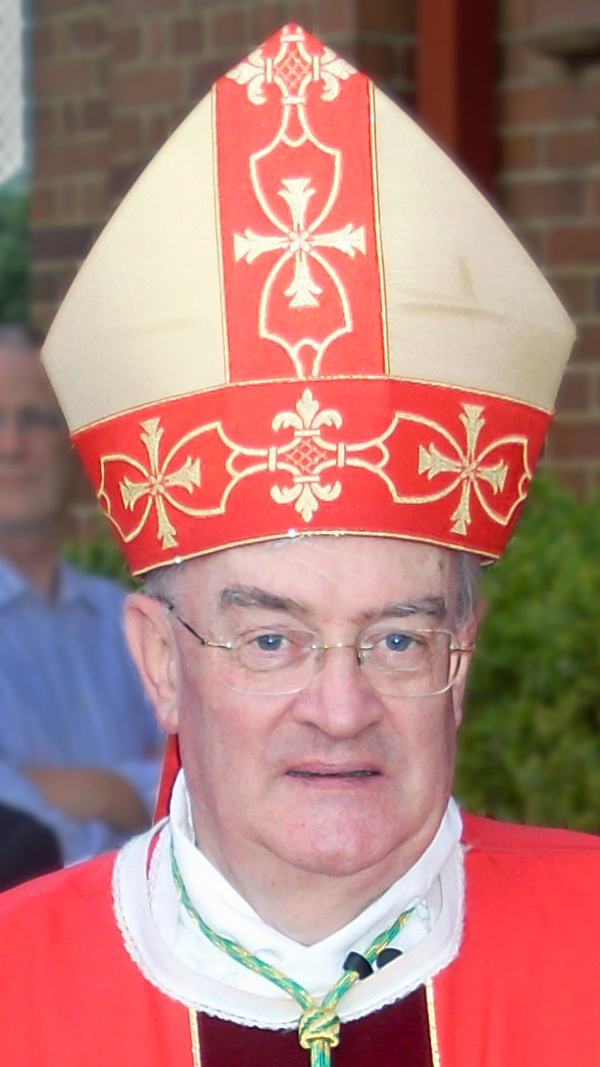
- Elliott in 2008
- Archdiocese: Melbourne
- Appointed: 30 April 2007
- Term ended: 3 November 2018
- Other post: Titular Bishop of Manaccenser (2007–2025)

Orders
- Ordination: 19 February 1973 by Lawrence Joseph Shehan
- Consecration: 15 June 2007 by Denis James Hart (co-consecrators: George Pell, Ambrose Battista De Paoli)
- Rank: Bishop

Personal details
- Born: Peter John Elliott; 1 October 1943 Melbourne, Victoria, Australia
- Died: 6 August 2025 (aged 81) Melbourne, Victoria, Australia
- Denomination: Roman Catholic
- Education: Melbourne Grammar School
- Alma mater: University of Melbourne; University of Oxford; Corpus Christi College; Pontifical Lateran University
- Motto: Parare Vias Eius (Prepare His Way)

Styles of Peter Elliott
- Reference style: The Most Reverend
- Spoken style: His Lordship or My Lord Bishop
- Religious style: Bishop

Peter John Elliott (1 October 1943 – 6 August 2025) was an Australian bishop of the Catholic Church who served as an auxiliary bishop of the Archdiocese of Melbourne from 2007 to 2018. He was also an author, writing a number of published works that predominantly concern the celebration of Catholic liturgy.

== Background ==
Elliott was born on 1 October 1943 in Melbourne, where he also grew up. His father served as an Anglican priest in the city. Elliott was received into the Catholic Church while a student at the University of Oxford.

He was of partial Sorbian descent. His maternal grandmother came from a family of Lutheran Sorbs who immigrated to the Wimmera region of Victoria, from what is now the German state of Saxony in the early 19th century. Their emigration from Germany was motivated by their dissent from the union of Lutheran and Calvinist churches that had recently taken place there.

Elliott died on 6 August 2025, at the age of 81. His Funeral was held at St Patricks Cathedral in Melbourne.https://tributes.theage.com.au/au/obituaries/theage-au/name/peter-elliott-obituary?id=59178849

== Education ==
Elliott earned an honours degree in history from the University of Melbourne, where he was a resident student at Trinity College. He was then awarded the Marley Studentship to study at Trinity College Theological School. He later read theology at the University of Oxford, then returned to Australia, studying for the Catholic priesthood at Corpus Christi College, Glen Waverley. In addition, Elliott completed his doctorate in sacred theology (STD) from the Pontifical Lateran University's Institute for Studies on Marriage and Family in Rome, writing a thesis on the sacramentality of marriage.

== Ordained ministry ==
=== Priesthood ===
On 19 February 1973, Elliott was ordained to the priesthood for the Archdiocese of Melbourne by Cardinal Lawrence Joseph Shehan, the Archbishop of Baltimore, during the 40th International Eucharistic Congress which took place in Melbourne and to which Shehan served as papal legate. Elliott then served as an assistant priest in several appointments in the archdiocese as well as secretary to Bishop John A. Kelly from 1979 to 1984.

==== Ministry in the Roman Curia ====
Elliott returned to Rome as an official of the Pontifical Council for the Family at the Vatican, serving for 10 years beginning in 1987. His service to the council included the promotion of marriage and family life at high-profile United Nations conferences.

Elliott also served in the Roman Curia as a consultator for the Congregation for Divine Worship and the Discipline of the Sacraments and as a member of Anglicanae Traditiones, the inter-dicasterial commission charged with preparing the liturgical books to be used by the personal ordinariates which Pope Benedict XVI established for Anglican converts to Catholicism.

=== Episcopate ===
On 30 April 2007, Pope Benedict XVI appointed him an auxiliary bishop of Melbourne and the titular bishop of Manaccenser. He received his episcopal consecration from Archbishop Denis Hart of Melbourne on 15 June 2007, with Cardinal George Pell of Sydney and Archbishop Ambrose Battista De Paoli, the Holy See's apostolic nuncio to Australia, serving as principal co-consecrators.

Following his ordination as a bishop, Elliott served on both the Bishops' Liturgy Commission and the National Liturgical Council of Australia.

Pope Francis announced in November 2018 that he had accepted Elliott's resignation, which was submitted on reaching the retirement age of 75.

== Bibliography ==
- Prayers of Jubilee: A Personal Prayerbook for Catholics (1976, Our Sunday Visitor)
- The Cross and the Ensign: A Naval History of Malta (1982, HarperCollins)
- What God Has Joined (1990, Alba House)
- Ceremonies of the Modern Roman Rite (1995, Ignatius Press)
  - Published the following year in Spanish as Guía práctica de liturgia by Ediciones Universidad de Navarra.
- Ceremonies of the Liturgical Year (2002, Ignatius Press)
- Liturgical Question Box (2018, Ignatius Press)
- Ceremonies Explained for Servers: A Manual for Altar Servers, Acolytes, Sacristans, and Masters of Ceremonies (2020, Ignatius Press)

Catholic Church titles
Preceded by —	Auxiliary Bishop of Melbourne; 2007–2018	Succeeded by —
Preceded by James Joseph O’Brien	Titular Bishop of Manaccenser; 2007–2025	Succeeded by Vacant
