= Philip James Benedict Harvey =

Philip James Benedict Harvey (16 March 1915, in Richmond upon Thames – 2 February 2003, in London) was a Roman Catholic auxiliary bishop of Westminster from 25 April 1977 to 3 July 1990.

== Life ==
Philip James Benedict Harvey received priest ordination on 3 June 1939.

Pope Paul VI appointed Harvey on 28 March 1977 as auxiliary bishop in Westminster and titular bishop of Bahanna. The archbishop of Westminster, Cardinal George Basil Hume, gave him the bishop's ordination on 25 April of that year. Co-consecrators were Basil Christopher Butler, auxiliary bishop in Westminster, and Patrick Joseph Casey, Bishop of Brentwood.

As an auxiliary bishop, Harvey had particular oversight for the North London area. His successor in this post was Vincent Nichols, later Archbishop of Westminster.

On 3 July 1990, Pope John Paul II accepted Bishop Harvey's resignation.
