= James Currie =

James Currie or Jim Currie may refer to:

- James Currie (birding expert) (born 1972), South African-born birding expert and television host
- James Currie (physician) (1756–1805), Scottish doctor and editor of the works of Robert Burns
- James Currie (politician) (1827–1901), Canadian politician
- James B. Currie (1925–2009), United States Air Force general
- Jim Currie, musician, of Goober & the Peas
- Jim Currie (basketball) (1916–1987), American professional basketball player
- Jim Currie (1841–1895), Old West outlaw who shot Maurice Barrymore and Ben Porter
- James Currie (shipowner) (1863–1930), Scottish scientist, President of the Royal Society of Edinburgh, owner of one of the world's biggest shipping companies

== See also ==
- James Curry (disambiguation), includes Jim Curry
