= James Curry =

James Curry may refer to:

- James Curry (Canadian football) (born 1957), Canadian football defensive tackle
- James Walter Curry (1856–1924), Ontario barrister and political figure
- James E. Curry (born 1948), American Episcopal bishop
- James Richard Curry (1946–1983), American serial killer and rapist
- Jim Curry (baseball), second baseman in Major League Baseball
- Jim Curry (bishop) (born 1960), British Roman Catholic Auxiliary Bishop in Westminster

== See also ==
- James Currie (disambiguation)
