= James Joseph O'Brien =

British clergyman and auxiliary bishop (1930–2007)

James Joseph O'Brien (born 5 August 1930 in Wood Green, Haringey, England, 11 April 2007) was a British clergyman and Roman Catholic auxiliary bishop in the Archbishopric of Westminster.

== Biography ==
On 12 June 1954 O'Brien received the priestly ordination in Westminster.

Pope Paul VI appointed him as auxiliary bishop in the archbishopric of Westminster on 28 June 1977 and as titular bishop of Manaccenser in North Africa. The Archbishop of Westminster, Cardinal Basil Hume, gave him the bishop's ordination on 21 September of that year. Co-consecrators were the auxiliary bishops in Westminster Basil Christopher Butler, Victor Guazzelli, Gerald Mahon, Philip James Benedict Harvey, and David Every Konstant.

As an auxiliary bishop of Westminster, O'Brien had particular pastoral oversight of the deaneries of Hertfordshire for 28 years, succeeding Bishop Christopher Butler; Bishop Butler remained as an auxiliary until his retirement in 1986, though not in a geographical role.

On 30 June 2005 Pope Benedict XVI accepted Bishop O'Brien's age-related resignation.

He died on 11 April 2007.
