= Paul McAleenan =

Northern Irish-born auxiliary bishop (born 1951)

The Right Reverend Paul McAleenan
- Titular Bishop of Mercia
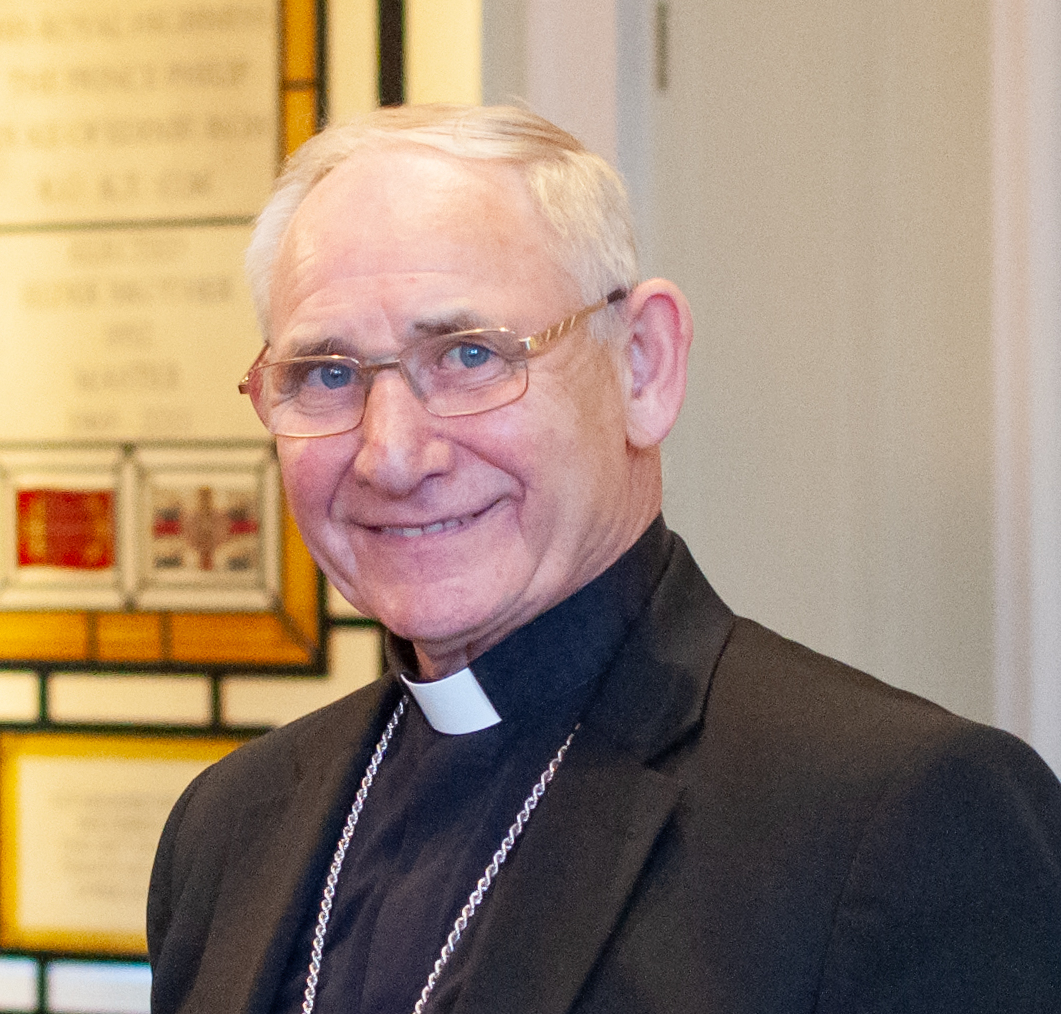
- McAleenan in 2024
- Church: Roman Catholic Church
- Archdiocese: Westminster
- See: Mercia
- Appointed: 24 November 2015
- Installed: 25 January 2016
- Predecessor: Anthony Edward Pevec
- Other post: Auxiliary Bishop in Westminster

Orders
- Ordination: 8 June 1985 by Basil Hume
- Consecration: 25 January 2016 by Vincent Nichols

Personal details
- Born: 15 July 1951 (age 75) Belfast, Northern Ireland, United Kingdom
- Education: St. Patrick's College, Thurles

Paul McAleenan (born 15 July 1951) is a Northern Irish-born Auxiliary Bishop for the Roman Catholic Diocese of Westminster in England.

== Biography ==
Born in Belfast, Northern Ireland on 15 July 1951, McAleenan attended St Gabriel's Secondary School in Belfast. He worked in engineering prior to entering the priesthood in 1979. McAleenan trained for the priesthood in St. Patrick's College, Thurles in Tipperary County, Ireland, and was ordained in 1985, for the Diocese of Westminster.

McAleenan served for 30 years in several English parishes. He was named Canon prior to his appointment as Auxiliary Bishop of Westminster in November 2015. As an auxiliary bishop, he has pastoral oversight for the deaneries in Hertfordshire.

Within the Catholic Bishops' Conference of England and Wales, McAleenan is the Lead Bishop for Migrants and Refugees and a member of the Conference's Department for International Affairs. In this capacity he has spoken out against violence perpetrated against refugees and asylum seekers.
