= List of churches in the City of Westminster =

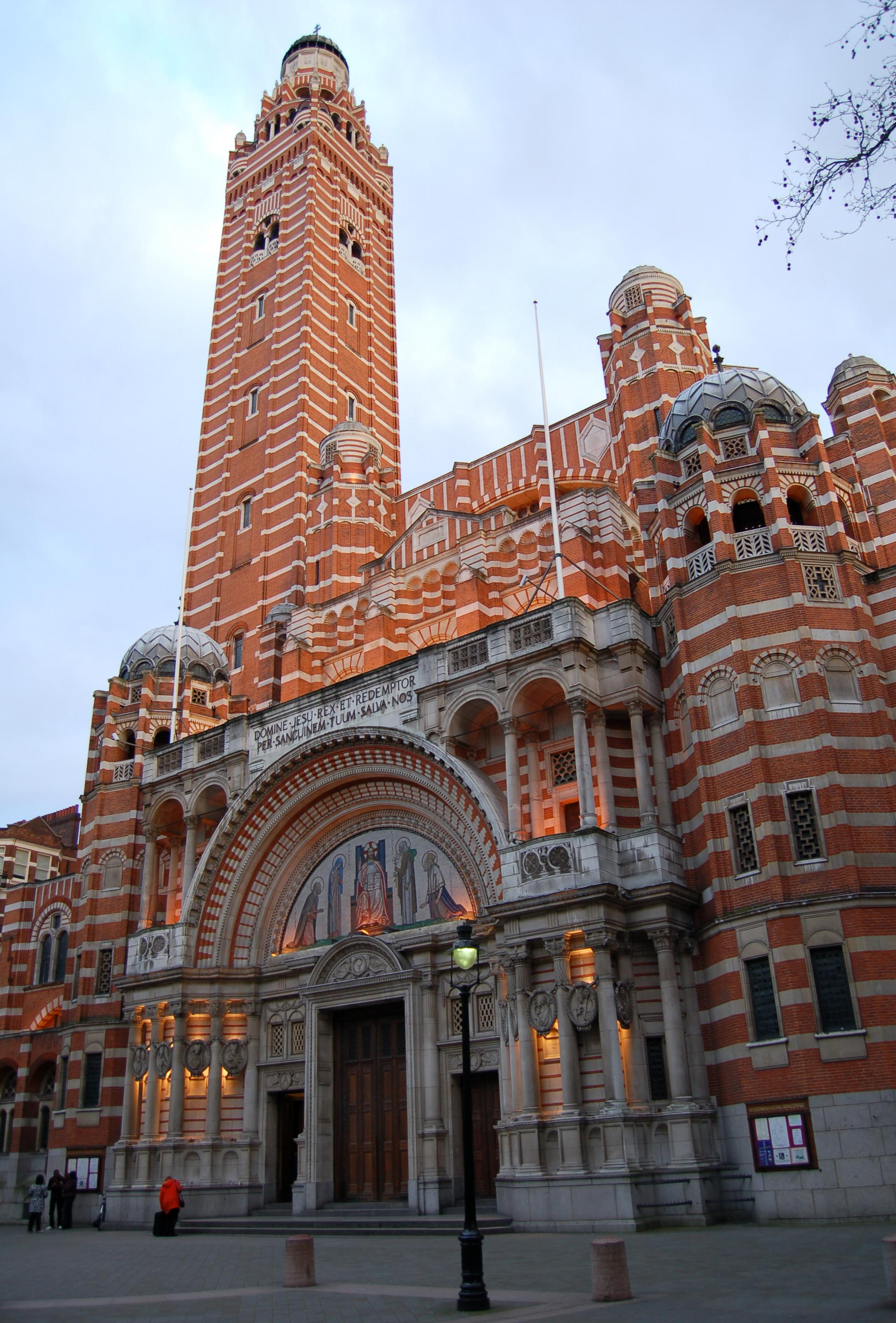
Westminster Cathedral from Victoria Street

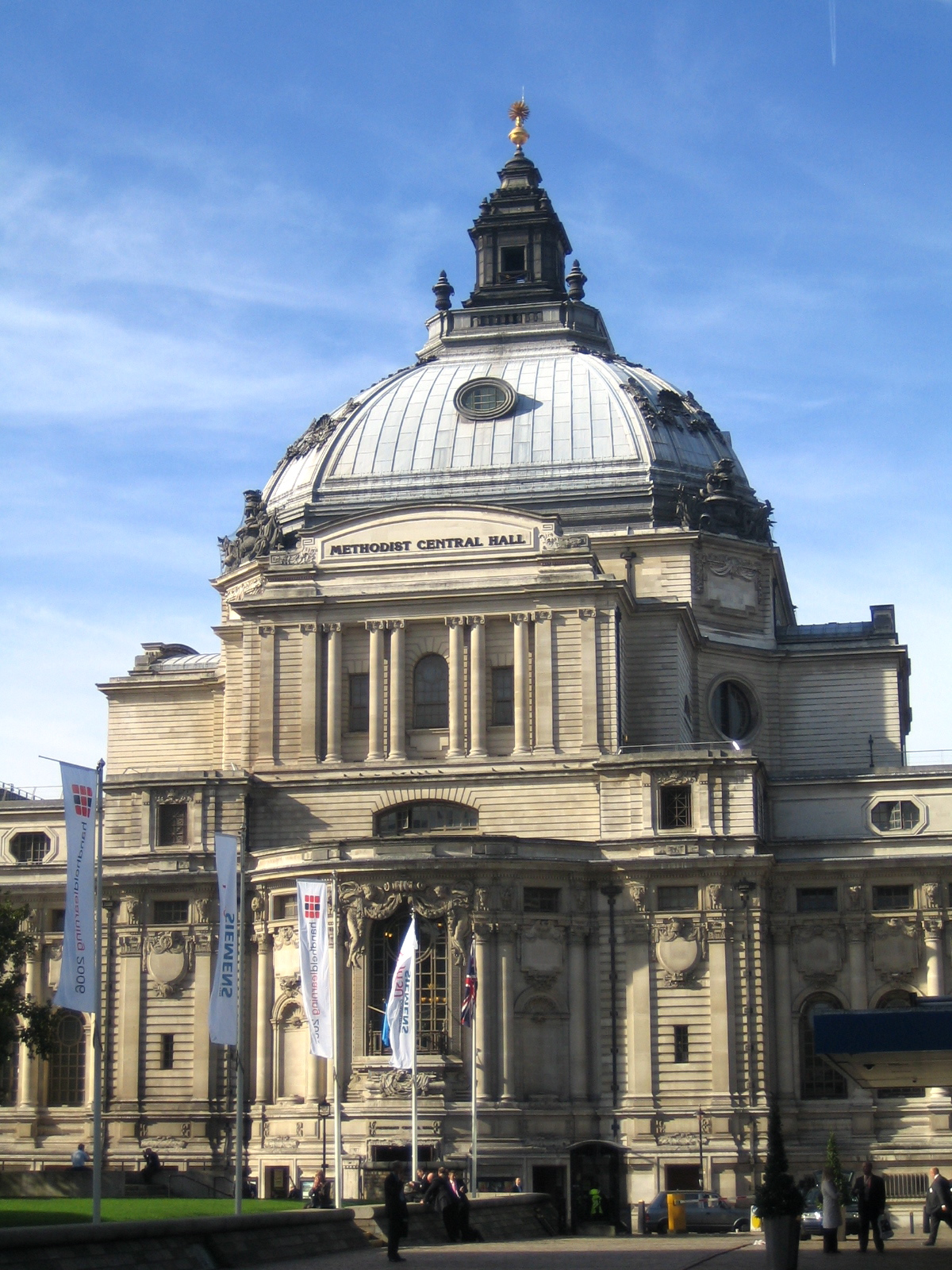
Methodist Central Hall Westminster is a Methodist church and conference centre

This is a list of cathedrals, churches and chapels in the City of Westminster within the Greater London. The list focuses on the more permanent churches and buildings which identify themselves as places of Christian worship. The denominations appended are those by which they self-identify.

== History ==
London's churches and chapels are extraordinarily numerous and diverse. Anglican and nonconformist churches and chapels are most numerous, but there are also many Catholic churches as well as places of worship for non-Christian religions.

Most of the Anglican churches lie within the Anglican dioceses of London to the north and Southwark to the south. The Catholic dioceses that cover Greater London are, north of the Thames and west of the Lea, the Diocese of Westminster; south of the Thames the Archdiocese of Southwark; and north of the Thames and east of the Lea, the Diocese of Brentwood.

=== Significance ===
Although many churches and chapels were entirely or partly lost to 19th-century demolitions and to bombing in the Second World War, many historic, architecturally significant and religiously significant buildings remain, particularly in the City of London and the City of Westminster. A number of the churches are mentioned in the nursery rhyme Oranges and Lemons. Churches in this list belong to various denominations, as indicated.

== List of churches ==
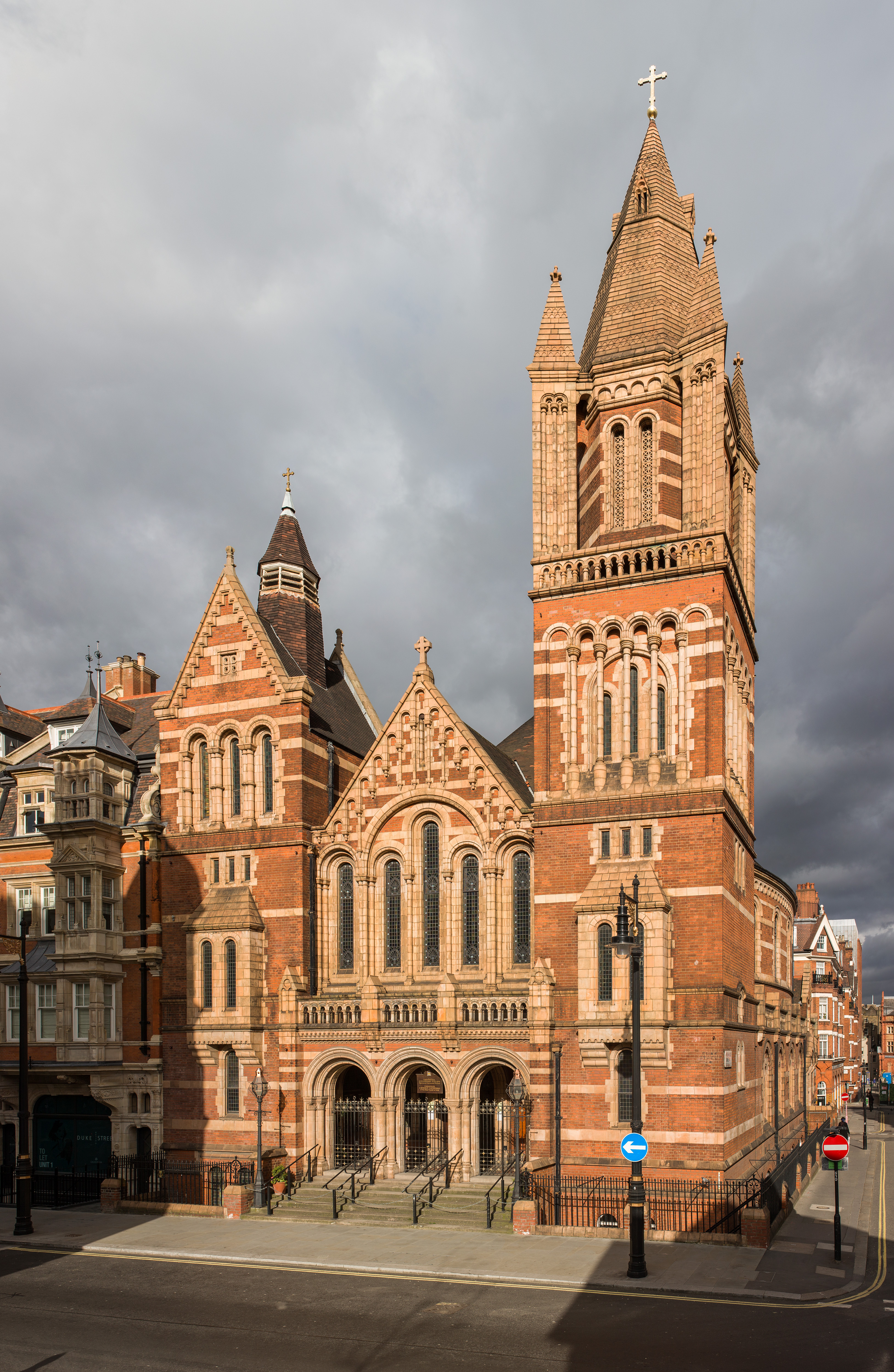
Ukrainian Catholic Cathedral of the Holy Family in Exile

=== Active churches ===
Church name	Location	Dedication	Web	Founded	Denomination	Notes
St Clement Danes	Strand	Pope Clement I		C9th	Anglican	Rebuilt C11th, C14th, 1680–1682, 1958
Westminster Abbey	Westminster	Peter		C10th	Anglican	Royal peculiar. Rebuilt 1245–1517
St Margaret, Westminster	Westminster	Margaret the Virgin		C11th	Anglican	Rebuilt 1486–1523. Now under governance of W. Abbey
St Marylebone Parish Church	Marylebone	Mary		C12th	Anglican	Relocated 1400, rebuilt 1742, relocated 1813–1817
St Martin-in-the-Fields	Trafalgar Square	Martin of Tours		C13th	Anglican	Rebuilt 1542, 1721–1726
St Mary le Strand	Strand	Mary		C13th	Anglican	Met in St Clement Danes 1549–1714. Rebuilt 1714–1723
St Mary on Paddington Green	Little Venice	Mary		Medieval	Anglican	Rebuilt 1791. Previous buildings were St Nicholas' & St James's
Savoy Chapel	Strand	John the Baptist		1512	Anglican	Royal peculiar
Queen's Chapel	St James			1623–1625	Anglican	Chapel Royal. External adjunct to St James's Palace
St Paul, Covent Garden	Covent Garden	Paul		1631–1633	Anglican	Known as 'the actors' church'. First post-Reformation UK church
St James, Piccadilly	Piccadilly	James		1684	Anglican	Restored following Blitz
St Anne, Soho	Soho	Anne		1677–1686	Anglican	Destroyed 1940, rebuilt 1990–1991
St George, Hanover Square	Mayfair	George		1721–1725	Anglican	
Grosvenor Chapel	Mayfair	Richard Grosvenor		1730	Anglican	Became chapel of ease 1829
Annunciation, Marble Arch	Marble Arch	Annunciation		1787	Anglican	Chapel of ease until rebuilding 1912–13
St John's Wood Church	St John's Wood	None?		1814	Anglican	Chapel of ease until 1952
St Matthew, Bayswater	Bayswater	Matthew		1818	Anglican	Rebuilt 1882
St Mary, Bryanston Square	Marylebone	Mary		1823–1824	Anglican	Commissioners' church. Recent HTB church plant
All Souls, Langham Place	Regent Street	All Souls		1824	Anglican	Commissioners' church
St Peter, Eaton Square	Belgravia	Peter		1824–1827	Anglican	Commissioners' church. Rebuilt 1837, and 1991 following arson
St John the Evangelist, Hyde Park	Paddington	John the Evangelist		1832	Anglican	
St James, Paddington	Paddington	James the Less		1841–1843	Anglican	Rebuilt 1882, renovated 1958
St Paul, Knightsbridge	Knightsbridge	Paul		1843	Anglican	
St Barnabas, Pimlico	Pimlico	Barnabas		1847–1850	Anglican	
St Matthew, Westminster	Westminster	Matthew		1849–1851	Anglican	Rebuilt 1984 following arson
St Gabriel, Warwick Square	Pimlico	Gabriel		1851–1853	Anglican	Anglo-Catholic
St Saviour, Warwick Avenue	Warwick Avenue	Jesus		1855–1856	Anglican	Rebuilt 1976. United with St Mary on Paddington Green 2010
St Stephen, Westbourne Park	Westbourne	Stephen		1856	Anglican	
All Saints, Margaret Street	Fitzrovia	All Saints		1850–1859	Anglican	Anglo-Catholic
St James the Less, Pimlico	Pimlico	James the Less		1858–1861	Anglican	
St Saviour, Pimlico	Pimlico	Jesus		1863–1864	Anglican	
St Cyprian, Clarence Gate	Marylebone	Cyprian		1866	Anglican	Rebuilt 1903
St Augustine, Kilburn	Kilburn	Augustine of C?		1870	Anglican	Rebuilt 1880. Bishop of Fulham
St Mary Magdalene, Paddington	Paddington	Mary Magdalene		1867–1872	Anglican	
St Mary, Bourne Street	Sloane Square	Mary		1874	Anglican	
St Luke, West Kilburn	West Kilburn	Luke		1876–1877	Anglican	
St David's Welsh Church, Paddington Green	Paddington	David of Wales		1885	Anglican	First building 1890, rebuilt 1896
Emmanuel, Harrow Road	Paddington	Jesus		1886	Anglican	Rebuilt 1995. United with St Luke's West Kilburn
Holy Trinity, South Kensington	S Kensington	Trinity		1901	Anglican	Earlier chapel in area dates back to 1629
Christ Church Mayfair	Mayfair	Jesus		2001	Anglican / Co-Mission	Church plant from St Helen's Bishopsgate. Building was CoE
Our Lady of the Assumption & St Gregory	Warwick Street	Mary & Gregory		1730s	Roman Catholic	Rebuilt 1789–1790. Central church of Ordinariate of OL Walsingham
St Patrick, Soho Square	Soho Square	Patrick		1792	Roman Catholic	Rebuilt 1893. Masses in Spanish and Portuguese
St James, Spanish Place	Marylebone	James		1793–1796	Roman Catholic	Originally connected with Spanish Embassy. New building 1890
Our Lady of St John's Wood	St John's Wood	Mary		1832	Roman Catholic	Rebuilt 1836
Immaculate Conception, Farm Street	Mayfair	Imm Conception		1849	Roman Catholic	served by the Society of Jesus. Parish church from 1966
Our Lady of the Rosary	Marylebone	Mary		1855	Roman Catholic	Rebuilt 1963
St Mary of the Angels, Bayswater	Bayswater	Mary		1851–1857	Roman Catholic	
St Charles Borromeo, Ogle Street	Fitzrovia	Charles Borromeo		1861–1863	Roman Catholic	parish associated with the Neocatechumenal Way
Notre Dame de France	Soho	Mary		1865	Roman Catholic	Francophone church. Building early C19th, reconstructed 1948–1953
Our Lady of Lourdes & St Vincent de Paul	Harrow Road	Mary & Vincent		1876	Roman Catholic	Building 1882, rebuilt 1976
Westminster Cathedral	Westminster	Precious Blood		1895–1903	Roman Catholic	
Our Lady of Sorrows/Our Lady of Lebanon	Paddington	Mary		1912	Roman Catholic	including services in both the Latin and Maronite rites
Holy Apostles, Pimlico	Pimlico	Apostles		1917	Roman Catholic	Old chapel of ease destroyed 1941. Rebuilt as parish church 1957
Our Lady, Queen of Heaven, Queensway	Queensway	Mary		1954	Roman Catholic	Became parish in 1973. Mass in English. Popular with visitors and tourists because of its location.
Our Lady, Queen of the World Convent Chapel	St John's Wood				Roman Catholic	
Sacred Heart of Jesus	Westminster				Roman Catholic	
Cathedral of the Holy Family in Exile	Mayfair	Holy Family		1965	Ukrainian Catholic	Building erected 1887 as King's Weigh House Congregational
St Sophia's Cathedral, Bayswater	Bayswater	Wisdom of God		1877–1879	Greek Orthodox	Replaced earlier church of Christ our Saviour, London Wall
Annunciation of the Mother of God	Bayswater				Greek Orthodox	Archdiocesan Chapel
Cathedral of the Dormition & All Saints	Knightsbridge	Dormition & All Sts		1956	Russian Orthodox	Building erected as All Saints Anglican church 1849
St John's Wood Road Baptist Church	St John's Wood			1826	Baptist	Moved to present site 1900s
Hinde Street Methodist Church	Marylebone			1807–1810	Methodist	Part of West London Methodist Mission; see also King's Cross MC
Methodist Central Hall, Westminster	Westminster			1905–1912	Methodist	
St Paul's United Reformed Church	Bayswater	Paul		c. 1870	URC	Formerly Presbyterian
Swiss Church in London	Covent Garden			1762	?	French, German. First building 1775, current one 1855
Ulrika Eleonora Church	Marylebone			1911	Ch of Sweden Abroad	Only Swedish church in London
French Protestant Church of London	Soho Square			1550	French Protestant	Building erected 1891–1893. Only Huguenot church in London
New Life Bible Presbyterian Church	Queen's Park			1993	Presbyterian	Separated from URC, meets in ex-URC building
Crown Court Church	Covent Garden			1711	Church of Scotland	Rebuilt 1909. Oldest CoS church in England
Regent Hall	Oxford Street			1882	Salvation Army	
Orange Street Congregational Church	St James's			1787	EFCC	
Westminster Chapel	Pimlico			1840	EFCC-FIEC	founded as Congregational. New building 1865
Westminster Meeting House	Westminster				Quakers	
Rossmore Hall Evangelical Church	Marylebone				Brethren	
Hope Community Church	Covent Garden				Independent	Meets in a cafe. Was Covent Garden Evangelical Church
Hope Hall	Queen's Park			C19th	Independent	

=== Defunct churches ===
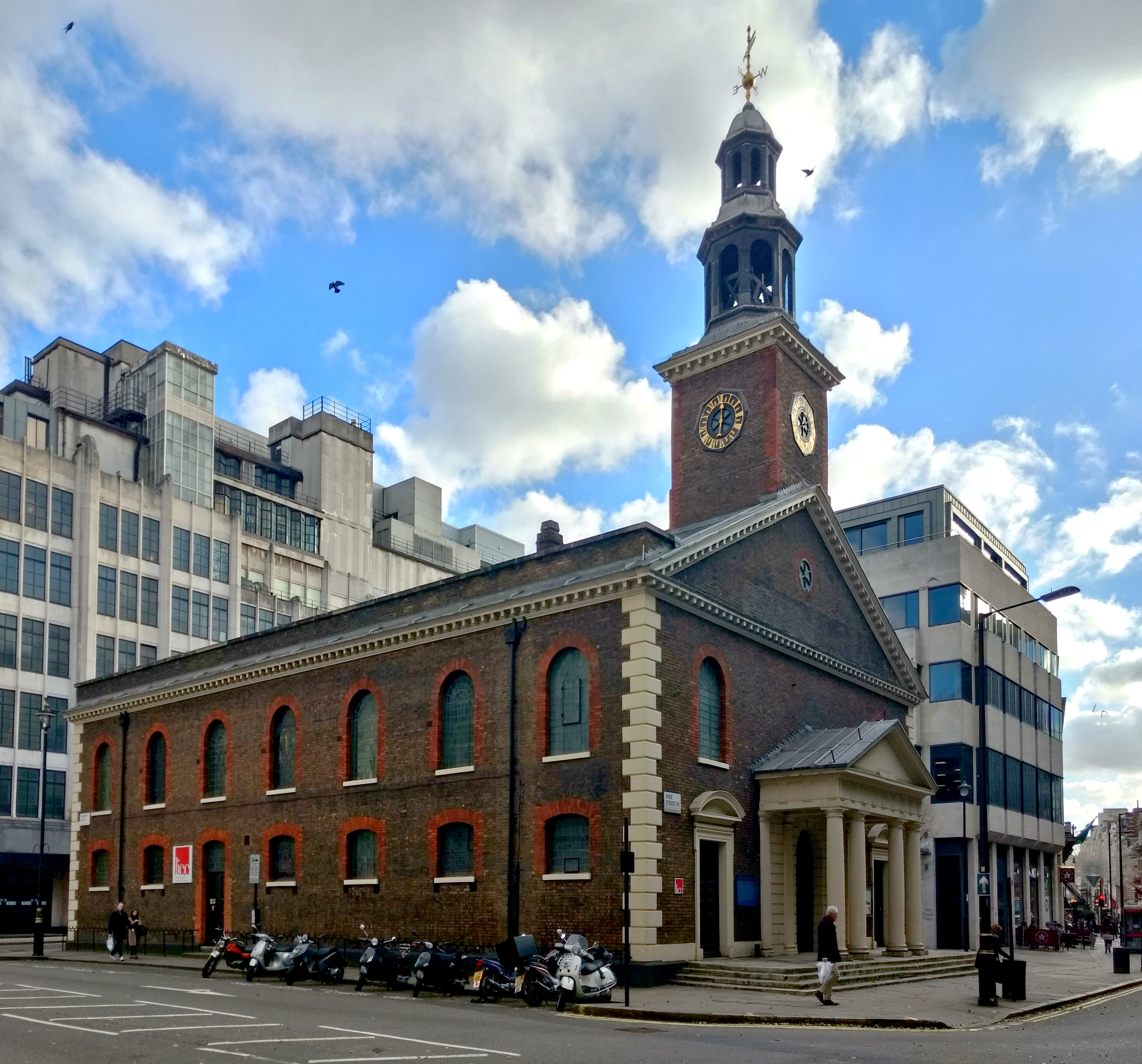
St Peter, Vere Street

Church name	Neighbourhood	Dedication	Founded	Ended	Denomination	Notes
St Peter, Vere Street	Marylebone	Peter	1722	C20th	Anglican	Once known as Oxford Chapel. Now home to London Institute for Contemporary Christianity
St John, Smith Square	Smith Square	John the Evangelist	1728	1941	Anglican	Restored 1962–1969, now used as a concert hall
St Mark, Mayfair	Mayfair	Mark	1825–1828	1974	Anglican	Now used for events and other church groups
Holy Trinity, Marylebone	Marylebone	Trinity	1828	1930s	Anglican	Now used for holding events
Christ Church, Harrow Road	Paddington	Jesus	1842	1940	Anglican	Demolished 1953
Holy Trinity, Bishop's Bridge Road	Paddington	Trinity	1846	1971	Anglican	Demolished 1984
All Saints, Norfolk Square	Paddington	All Saints	1848	1919	Anglican	Demolished 1961
Christ Church, Lancaster Gate	Paddington	Jesus	1856	1977	Anglican	Demolished
St Philip, Manor Place	Paddington	Philip	1861	1893	Anglican	Demolished
St Michael & All Angels, Star Street	Paddington	Michael & Angels	1864	1964	Anglican	Demolished 1967
Christ Church Down Street	Mayfair	Jesus	1865	1990s	Anglican	Closed 1990s but now used by Christ Church Mayfair, a new CoE church (see above)
St Luke, Tavistock Road	Paddington	Luke	1868	1963	Anglican	Demolished
St Peter, Elgin Avenue	Paddington	Peter	1871	1975	Anglican	Demolished
St Paul, Harrow Road	Paddington	Paul	1874	1947	Anglican	Demolished
St Jude, Lancefield Street	Paddington	Jude	1879	1959	Anglican	Demolished
St Martha, Cirencester Street	Paddington	Martha	1880	1957	Anglican	Demolished
St Simon, Saltram Crescent	Paddington	Simon the Zealot	1899	1978	Anglican	
Enon Chapel			1823	1839	Baptist	
West Street Chapel	St James		1741	early C19th	Methodist	No longer used as a church
Queen's Park United Reformed Church	Harrow Road				URC	

== Related lists ==
- List of churches in London
- List of Christopher Wren churches in London
- List of places of worship in London, 1804
- Union of Benefices Act 1860
- Commission for Building Fifty New Churches

== External links/sources ==
- Anglican Diocese of London
- Baptist Union Churches
- Church of England Parish Finder
- Church of England churches in central London
- The Church of Jesus Christ of Latter-day Saints
- The History Files Churches of the British Isles
- Congregational Churches in London
- Friends of the City Churches
- Gospel Hall Finder
- Greek Orthodox Archdiocese of Thyateira and Great Britain
- Love's Guide to the Church Bells of the City of London
- Methodist Church of Great Britain Church Search
- Roman Catholic Diocese of Brentwood Parishes A-Z
- Roman Catholic Diocese of Westminster – Virtual Diocese
- Roman Catholic Archdiocese of Southwark – Parish Directory
- Seventh-day Adventist Churches in London
- United Reformed Church Find A Church
- Redeemed Christian Church of God
