= Manaccenser =

The Diocese of Manaccenser (Latin: Dioecesis Menaccenseritana) is a suppressed and titular see of the Roman Catholic Church.

The diocese of Manaccenser is ancient, and was originally founded on a Roman town of the Roman province of Mauretania Caesariensis (Roman North Africa) that went by the same name. That ancient town is now lost to history but it was in the region of Cherchell in today's Algeria.

The only known bishop of this diocese from antiquity is Victor, who took part in the synod assembled in Carthage in 484 by the Vandal King Huneric. After the synod, Victor was exiled.

Today Manaccenser survives as a titular bishopric, and the bishop until his death in August 2025 was Peter Elliott, auxiliary bishop of Melbourne, who replaced James Joseph O'Brien in 2007.
