= Archdiocese of Westminster =

Catholic jurisdiction in England

Coordinates: 51.4960°N 0.1396°W

Archdiocese of Westminster Archdioecesis Vestmonasteriensis

Catholic
- Coat of arms

Location
- Country: England
- Territory: Hertfordshire; Middlesex
- Ecclesiastical province: Westminster
- Deaneries: 21

Statistics
- Area: 3,634 km^{2} (1,403 sq mi)
- Population: Total; Catholics: (as of 2023); 5,033,930; 450,240 (8.9%)
- Parishes: 206

Information
- Denomination: Catholic Church
- Sui iuris church: Latin Church
- Rite: Roman Rite
- Established: 29 September 1850
- Cathedral: Westminster Cathedral
- Patron saint: Our Lady; St Joseph; St Edward the Confessor
- Secular priests: 297 (2025)

Current leadership
- Pope: Leo XIV
- Archbishop: Richard Moth
- Auxiliary Bishops: Paul McAleenan; James Curry
- Vicar General: Martin Hayes
- Bishops emeritus: Vincent Nichols

Map
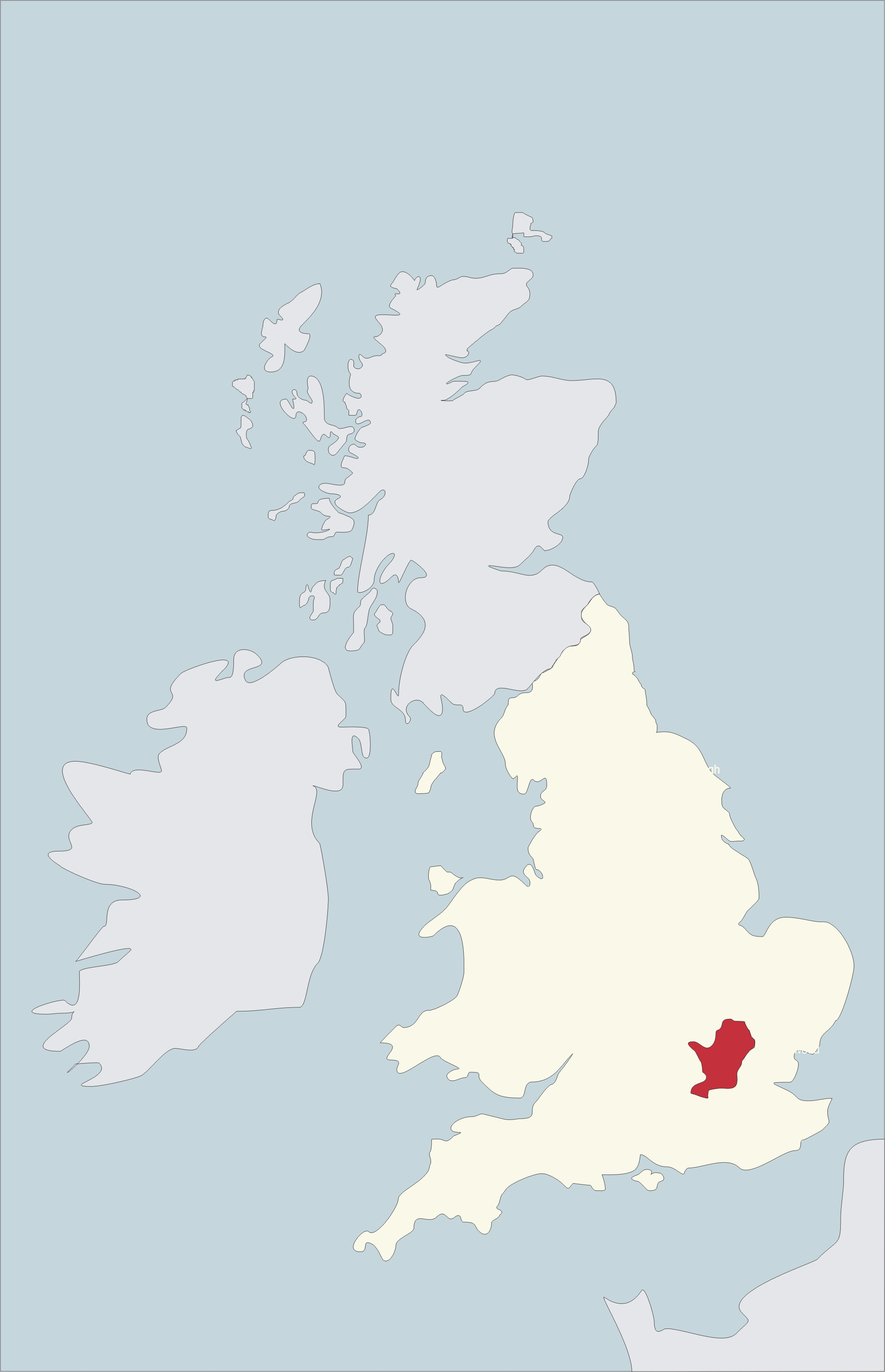

Website
- rcdow.org.uk

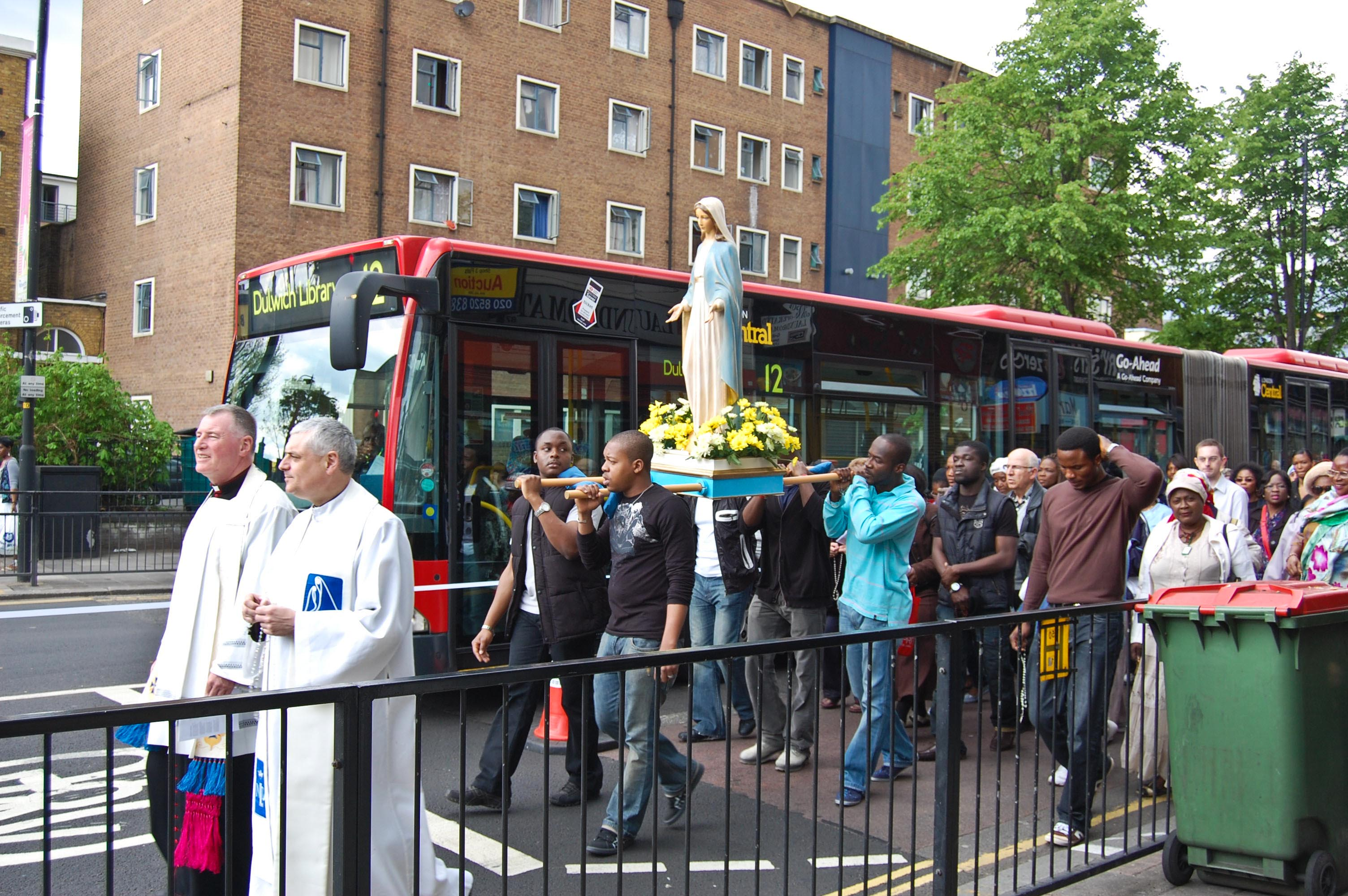
Marian procession in Camberwell, 2010

The Archdiocese of Westminster (Latin: Archdioecesis Vestmonasteriensis) is a Latin archdiocese of the Catholic Church in England and Wales. Although a metropolitan archdiocese governed by an archbishop, it is usually referred to as the Diocese of Westminster. The archdiocese covers the historic counties of Hertfordshire and Middlesex.

The diocese is led by the Archbishop of Westminster, who serves as pastor of Westminster Cathedral, as well as the metropolitan bishop of the Province of Westminster. Since the re-establishment of the English Catholic dioceses in 1850, each archbishop of Westminster—including the most recent, Cardinal Vincent Nichols—has been created a cardinal by the pope in consistory, often as the only cardinal in England, and is now the 43rd of English cardinals since the 12th century. It is also customary for the metropolitan archbishop of Westminster to be selected president of the Catholic Bishops' Conference of England and Wales providing a degree of a formal direction for the other English bishops and archbishops. Though not formally a primate, he has special privileges conferred by the papal bull Si qua est. The metropolitan archbishop of Westminster has not been granted the title of Primate of England and Wales, which is sometimes applied to him, but his position has been described as that of "chief metropolitan" of the Catholic Church in England and Wales and as "similar to" that of the archbishop of Canterbury in the Church of England (as the metropolitan bishop of the Province of Canterbury). The diocese is one of the smallest dioceses in England and Wales in geographical area, but the largest in terms of Catholic population and priests.

The suffragan sees of Westminster are the dioceses of Brentwood, East Anglia, Northampton, and Nottingham.

== History ==
The archdiocese essentially covers the same region as the Church of England Diocese of London as it was before the English Reformation until 1850, adopting—like all other dioceses across England (created that year)—an alternative name (originally because of the Ecclesiastical Titles Act 1851) but based on the centuries-old divisions of the country. The diocese effectively survived the period of Catholic oppression in English history as a missionary territory established by canons accepted by Rome in 1622 as the Apostolic Vicariate of England which was in public law pronounced in England and Wales illegal as counter to the established church.

The mostly clandestine apostolic vicariate covering the country was divided so that the Apostolic Vicariate of London District formed on 30 January 1688 coinciding with a degree of freedoms. By decree of Pope Pius IX (Universalis Ecclesiae), this entity gained its elevation to the rank of a metropolitan diocese (instead of archdiocese) on 29 September 1850.

== Present ==
On 3 April 2009, it was announced that the Archbishop of Birmingham, the Most Reverend Vincent Nichols, would become the 11th Archbishop of Westminster. Cormac Murphy-O'Connor, who was installed as tenth Archbishop of Westminster on 22 March 2000 and was elevated to the rank of cardinal-priest of the title of Santa Maria Sopra Minerva by Pope John Paul II on 21 February 2001, became archbishop emeritus. Cardinal Murphy-O'Connor had announced on 9 July 2007 that, in accordance with the age limit of 75 years prescribed for bishops in the 1983 Code of Canon Law, he had submitted his resignation to Pope Benedict XVI, but that the Pope had asked him to continue in his pastoral ministry as archbishop beyond the age limit until further provision was made, as occurred in 2009.

The archbishop is usually assisted by four auxiliary bishops, each with specific areas of responsibility within the administration of the diocese. One of the auxiliary bishops serves as chancellor and moderator of the metropolitan curia; one as vicar for the clergy; one for pastoral affairs; and one for education and formation.

The metropolitan curia and chancery offices are located at Vaughan House, outside Westminster Cathedral in central London. The diocesan seminary, Allen Hall, is located in Chelsea, West London, and (with Ushaw College) is a direct descendant of the seminary of Douai College, France.

The Diocese is a registered charity No. 233699.

== Bishops ==
=== Ordinaries ===
==== Vicars Apostolic of England (and Wales) ====
- William Bishop (1623–1624)
- Richard Smith (1624–1632)
- John Leyburn (1685–1688); see below

==== Vicars Apostolic of London District ====
- John Leyburn (1688–1702); see above
- Bonaventure Giffard (1703–1734)
- Benjamin Petre (1734–1758)
- Richard Challoner (1758–1781)
- James Robert Talbot (1781–1790)
- John Douglass (1790–1812)
- William Poynter (1812–1827)
- James Yorke Bramston (1827–1836)
- Thomas Griffiths (1836–1847)
- Thomas Walsh (1848–1849)
- Nicholas Wiseman (1849–1850): see below; future Cardinal

==== Archbishops ====
- Cardinal Nicholas Wiseman (1850–1865): see above
- Cardinal Henry Manning (1865–1892)
- Cardinal Herbert Vaughan (1892–1903)
- Cardinal Francis Bourne (1903–1935)
- Cardinal Arthur Hinsley (1935–1943)
- Cardinal Bernard Griffin (1943–1956)
- Cardinal William Godfrey (1956–1963)
- Cardinal John Carmel Heenan (1963–1976)
- Cardinal Basil Hume, OSB (1976–1999)
- Cardinal Cormac Murphy-O'Connor (2000–2009)
- Cardinal Vincent Nichols (2009–2025)
- Archbishop Richard Moth (2026–present)

=== Coadjutor Vicars Apostolic ===
- James Yorke Bramston (1823–1827)
- Richard Challoner (1739–1758)
- Robert Gradwell (1828–1833), did not succeed to see
- Thomas Griffiths (1833–1836)
- Henry Howard (1720), did not take effect
- Benjamin Petre (1721–1734)
- William Poynter (1803–1812)
- James Robert Talbot (1759–1781)

=== Coadjutor Archbishops ===
- George Errington (1855–1860), did not succeed to see
- Edward Myers (1951–1956), did not succeed to see

=== Auxiliary Bishops ===
- William Weathers (1872–1895)
- James Laird Patterson (1880–1902)
- Robert Brindle (1899–1901), appointed Bishop of Nottingham
- Algernon Charles Stanley (1903–1928)
- Patrick Fenton (1904–1918)
- William Anthony Johnson (1906–1909)
- Joseph Butt (1911–1938)
- Emmanuel John Bidwell (1917–1930)
- Edward Myers (1932-–1951), appointed Coadjutor here
- David James Mathew (1938–1946), appointed apostolic delegate and titular archbishop
- George Laurence Craven (1947–1967)
- David John Cashman (1958–1965), appointed Bishop of Arundel and Brighton
- Patrick Joseph Casey (1965–1969), appointed Bishop of Brentwood
- Basil Butler (1966–1986)
- Gerald Thomas Mahon (1970–1992)
- Victor Guazzelli (1970–1996)
- David Konstant (1977–1985), appointed Bishop of Leeds
- Philip James Benedict Harvey (1977–1990)
- James Joseph O'Brien (1977–2005)
- John Patrick Crowley (1986–1992), appointed Bishop of Middlesbrough
- Vincent Gerard Nichols (1991–2000), appointed Archbishop of Birmingham; later returned here as Archbishop; future Cardinal
- Patrick O'Donoghue (1993–2001), appointed Bishop of Lancaster
- Arthur Roche (2001–2002), appointed Coadjutor Bishop of Leeds
- George Stack (2001–2011), appointed Archbishop of Cardiff, Wales
- Bernard Longley (2003–2009), appointed Archbishop of Birmingham
- Alan Stephen Hopes (2003–2013), appointed Bishop of East Anglia
- John Stanley Kenneth Arnold (2005–2014), appointed Bishop of Salford
- John Francis Sherrington (2011–2025), appointed Archbishop of Liverpool
- Nicholas Gilbert Erskine Hudson (2014–2025), appointed Bishop of Plymouth
- John Wilson (2015–2019), appointed Archbishop of Southwark
- Paul McAleenan (2015–present)
- James Curry (2024–present)

=== Other priests of this diocese who became bishops ===
- Bonaventure Giffard, appointed Vicar Apostolic of Western District in 1688; later returned here as Vicar Apostolic
- James Smith, appointed Vicar Apostolic of Northern District in 1688
- John Talbot Stonor, appointed Vicar Apostolic of Northern District in 1715
- Francis Petre, appointed Coadjutor Vicar Apostolic of Northern District in 1750
- Thomas Joseph Talbot, appointed Coadjutor Vicar Apostolic of Midland District in 1766
- William Walton, appointed Coadjutor Vicar Apostolic of Northern District in 1770
- Charles Berington, appointed Coadjutor Vicar Apostolic of Midland District in 1786
- John Vertue (Virtue), appointed Bishop of Portsmouth in 1882
- John Larkin, appointed Coadjutor Bishop of Kingston, Ontario, Canada in 1832 and Bishop of Toronto, Ontario, Canada in 1849; neither took effect; became a Jesuit in 1840
- Charles Michael Baggs, appointed Vicar Apostolic of Western District in 1844
- Thomas Grant, appointed Bishop of Southwark in 1851
- John Baptist Butt, appointed auxiliary bishop of Southwark in 1884
- Henry O'Callaghan, appointed Bishop of Hexham and New Castle in 1887
- Peter Emmanuel Amigo, appointed Bishop of Southwark in 1904
- Thomas Dunn, appointed Bishop of Nottingham in 1916
- Bernard Nicholas Ward, appointed Apostolic Administrator, later Bishop, of Brentwood in 1917
- James Donald Scanlan, appointed Coadjutor Bishop of Dunkeld, Scotland in 1946
- Derek John Harford Worlock, appointed Bishop of Portsmouth in 1965
- William Gordon Wheeler, appointed Coadjutor Bishop of Middlesbrough in 1964, later Bishop, of Leeds in 1966
- Mark O'Toole, appointed Bishop of Plymouth in 2013

== Liturgical and pastoral life ==
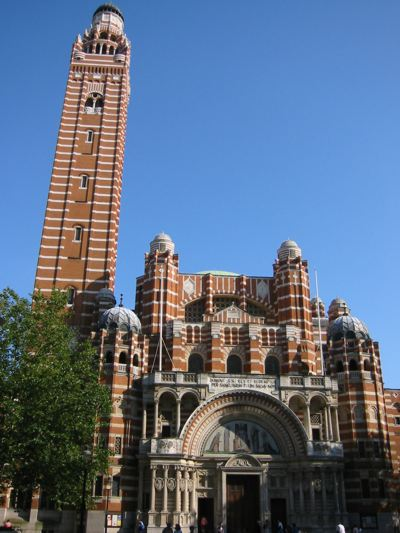
Westminster Cathedral is the mother church of the Roman Catholic Archdiocese of Westminster.

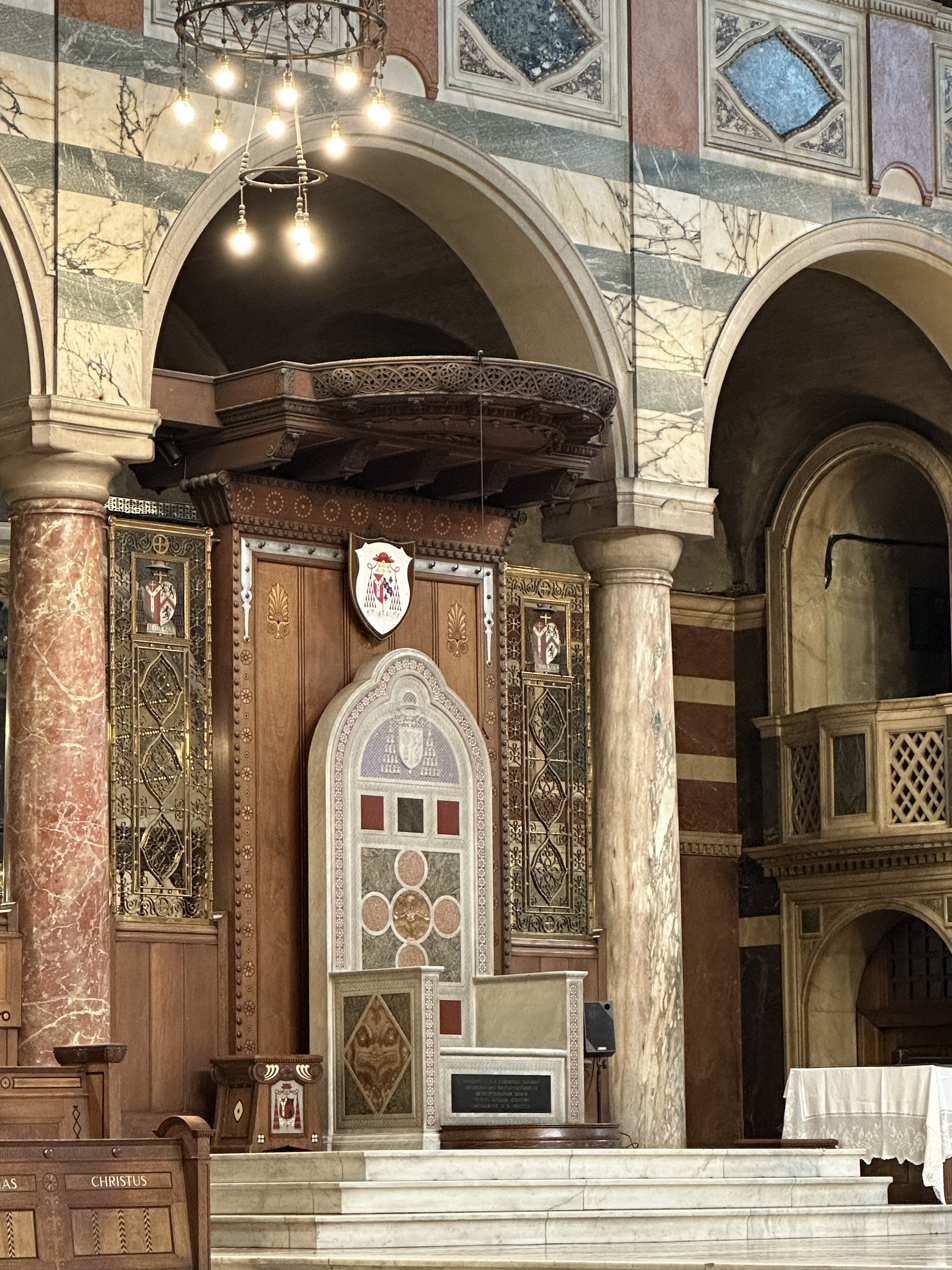
The seat of the Archbishop of Westminster in 2024. The coat of arms of the incumbent Cardinal Vincent Nichols is placed above.

Liturgy in the diocese is primarily based around the ordinary form of the Roman Rite, promulgated by Pope Paul VI, now in its third edition. However, as might be expected from a city as cosmopolitan as London, there is a great diversity in the liturgy as celebrated by Catholics. The Latin Mass Society celebrates the liturgy according to the extraordinary form of the Roman Rite. The Ukrainian Greek Catholics have a strong presence in the diocese with their own cathedral in Binney Street close to Bond Street. There is a Lebanese Maronite community based at Our Lady of Sorrows Catholic Church in Cirencester Street in West London; a Melkite community in Pimlico, at St Barnabas' Church of England church; an Ethiopian Catholic church, Our Lady Queen of Heaven, in Queensway West London; an Eritrean Catholic Church, St Aidan of Lindisfarne, in East Acton; a Chaldean Catholic church, St Anne's, in Laxton Place; and a Belarusian Catholic church in Holden Avenue in North London. There are also a large number of Masses for the expatriate Polish community; as well as dedicated French, German, Italian, Portuguese and Spanish language churches. There are also ethnic chaplaincies serving Catholics from Africa, Albania, Brazil, the Caribbean, China, Croatia, the Philippines, India, Hungary, Ireland, Korea, Latin America, Lithuania, Malta, Portugal, Romania, Slovakia, Czechia, Slovenia, Sri Lanka, Traveller, Gypsy and Roma communities, and Vietnam.

The diocese is also responsible for many institutional chaplaincies, including Heathrow Airport, hospitals and prisons. See St. George's Interdenominational Chapel, Heathrow Airport for more information about the Heathrow Airport Latin-Church Catholic chaplaincy.

There are a large number of religious communities in the diocese. Religious orders of men include: the Assumptionists at Bethnal Green, Hitchin and Burnt Oak; the Augustinians at Hammersmith and Hoxton; the Augustinian Recollects at Kensal New Town, Kensington and Wembley; the Benedictines at Ealing Abbey and Cockfosters; the Carmelites at Finchley East; Discalced Carmelites at Kensington; the Christian Brothers at Twickenham; the missionary Columban Fathers at Hampstead; the Dominicans at Haverstock Hill; the Franciscans at Pimlico; the Franciscan Friars of the Atonement in Westminster; the Holy Ghost Fathers at New Barnett and Northwood; and the Passionists at Highgate. The Jesuits have a large presence in London with communities in Mayfair (at Farm Street), Southall, Stamford Hill and Swiss Cottage. The Oratorians are based at the Church of the Immaculate Heart of Mary in Kensington, which is popularly known as the Brompton Oratory and is the largest church in the diocese after Westminster Cathedral.

Religious communities of women include the Carmelites at Golders Green and Ware; the Poor Clares in Barnet; the Franciscan Sisters of Our Lady of Victories at the cathedral; the Ursulines of Jesus at Hoxton, Kingsland and Stamford Hill; the Dominicans at Bushey, Cricklewood, Ealing, Edgware, Harpenden, Harrow on the Hill, Haverstock Hill, Hemel Hempstead, Osterley, Stevenage and Pinner. The Institute of the BVM is located in Swiss Cottage, Acton, Osterley, Redbourn and St Albans. The Sisters of Mercy are located at the cathedral, Acton East, Bethnal Green, Bow, Clapton Park, Commercial Road, Cricklewood, Feltham, Hampton Hill, Hillingdon, Kensal, Newtown, Marylebone Road, St Albans, St John's Wood, Twickenham and Underwood Road. The Servants of the Mother of God at Bayswater, Hampton and Somers Town.

The diocese is involved in both the independent and state school sectors. Some 159 state and 10 independent primary schools are in the diocese along with 42 state and 4 independent secondary schools. There are also a further five independent primary / secondary and special schools including the Choristers school attached to the cathedral.

Music in the diocese is as diverse as the communities represented in it, but the all-male cathedral choir is reputedly one of the best in the country and sings at all chief Masses in the cathedral as well as the daily divine offices. There are several choirs that specialise in Gregorian Chant and a Charismatic group centred on the diocesan seminary at Allen Hall.

== See also ==
- List of churches in the City of Westminster
- St George's Interdenominational Chapel, Heathrow Airport
- Catholic Church in England and Wales
- List of Catholic churches in the United Kingdom
