= Allen Hall Seminary =

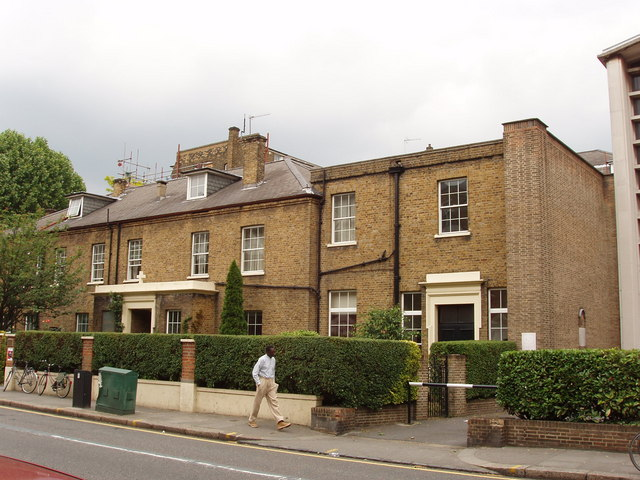
- Entrance

- Location in Kensington and Chelsea
- 51°29′01″N 0°10′29″W
- OS grid reference: TQ 26873 77654
- Location: 28 Beaufort Street Chelsea, London
- Country: England
- Denomination: Roman Catholic
- Website: allenhall.org.uk

History
- Former name: Convent of Adoration Reparatrice
- Founded: 1524; 502 years ago
- Founder: William Allen
- Dedicated: 1975

Architecture
- Functional status: Seminary & Catholic Theological College, Mater Ecclesiae, Pontifical Institute.
- Heritage designation: Grade II listed
- Designated: 15 April 1969

Administration
- Province: Westminster
- Archdiocese: Westminster
- Deanery: Kensington and Chelsea
- Parish: Our Most Holy Redeemer and St Thomas More, Chelsea

Allen Hall Seminary, often abbreviated to Allen Hall, is the Roman Catholic seminary and theological college of the Province of Westminster at 28 Beaufort Street in Chelsea, London, in the London Borough of Kensington and Chelsea. It is situated on the site of the house that was once occupied by St Thomas More. Though nothing of the house remains, parts of the 16th-century garden wall exist today.

== Allen Hall Seminary ==
=== Overview ===
Allen Hall Seminary, located in the Chelsea district of London, serves as the principal seminary for the Roman Catholic Archdiocese of Westminster. With its roots tracing back to the 16th century, the seminary was originally established in Douai, France. Its primary function is to train men for the priesthood, offering an extensive curriculum in Catholic theology, spirituality, and pastoral ministry.

== History ==
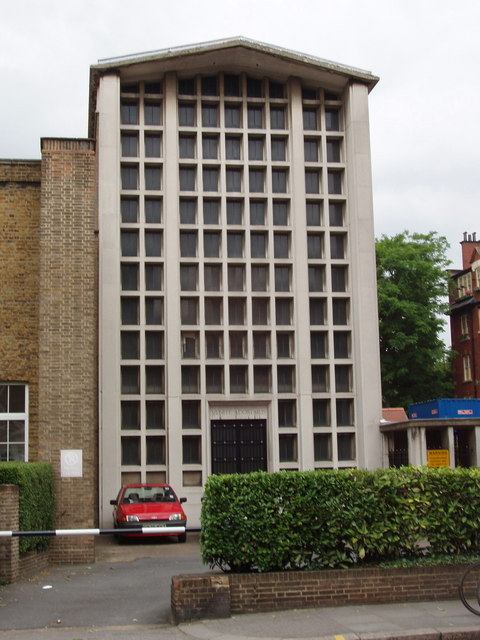
Chapel exterior

The seminary's inception dates back to the 16th century, originating in Douai, France. This historical context plays a significant role in its traditions and educational ethos.

The Catholic theological college is named after Cardinal William Allen who founded a seminary in Douai, France, in 1568 to provide for the English mission in time of persecution when it was illegal to train men for the Catholic priesthood in England.

In 1793, the professors and students moved from Douai to Ware, Hertfordshire, to escape the French revolution and founded St Edmund's College.

The site of the seminary dates back to 1524, when it was purchased by Henry VIII's chancellor, Thomas More. Although his house no longer exists, one of the mulberry trees he planted survives in the seminary garden, which is one of the largest gardens in Chelsea.

The current building is a former convent built by French nuns in the 19th and 20th centuries, the Sisters of the Adoration Réparatrice, who occupied it until 1975 when it was bought by the Archdiocese of Westminster. The college chapel was designed by Hector Corfiato and was completed in 1958.

In 1975 the seminary itself moved its present-day site which allowed St Edmund's to expand as a school and became Allen Hall.

== Educational programmes ==
Allen Hall seminary, under the authority of the Archbishop of Westminster, serves not only the dioceses within the Province of Westminster but also welcomes seminarians from other dioceses in England, Wales, and further abroad. Those training for the priesthood typically undergo a six-year formation programme following the guidelines set out in the Ratio Fundamentalis Institutionis Sacerdotalis. This document emphasizes that the path to priesthood in the Roman Catholic Church requires a comprehensive approach, covering four main areas of formation: Spiritual Development, Human Formation, Intellectual Formation, and Pastoral Formation.

=== Formation ===
Following the guidelines of the Ratio Fundamentalis Institutionis Sacerdotalis,The first stage, "Discipleship," lasting two years, is grounded in philosophy. This foundational stage lays the intellectual groundwork necessary for the deeper theological studies that follow. As seminarians progress to the third year, they enter the "Configuration to Christ" stage, also known as the "Stage of Theology." This period marks a significant shift from purely academic study to a more practical, pastoral approach. The introduction of "Pastoral Theology" in the third year is crucial. It serves as a bridge between the theoretical knowledge gained in the first two years and the practical application of this knowledge in real-world pastoral settings.
The introduction course in Practical Pastoral Theology is a prelude to a vital component of this stage: a year-long placement in a parish. This experience immerses seminarians in the day-to-day life of pastoral work, allowing them to apply their theological knowledge in a practical context and gain invaluable experience in ministering to a community.
Following this intensive pastoral experience, the seminarians return for the final three years of theological studies. This period is not just a continuation of earlier theological education but is enhanced by the practical insights and experiences gained during their parish placement. The curriculum during these years remains firmly centered on deepening their understanding of theology.
The journey culminates in the "Pastoral Synthesis," a time when all the years of study, reflection, and practical experience are integrated. This final stage is directly geared towards preparing the seminarians for ordination to the diaconate, the final step before priesthood. It is a time for synthesizing the intellectual, spiritual, and pastoral dimensions of their training, ensuring they are fully prepared for the responsibilities and challenges of priestly ministry..

As well as teaching the philosophy and theology subjects prescribed by the Ratio Fundamentalis, every student is also required to gain pastoral experiences throughout the entire period of priestly formation. Placements typically include parishes, schools and hospitals and, if appropriate, in a more specialised placement such as a hospice or prison. The staff there help the students reflect on their pastoral experiences both individually and with others.

=== Mater Ecclesiae College ===
Since 2019, studies are completed through the Mater Ecclesiae College, a Pontifical Institute based at Allen Hall, which is in partnership with St Mary’s University, Twickenham. All Mater Ecclesiae students who complete their degrees may receive both the civil degree, a BA (Hons) in Theological Studies from St Mary’s, as well as the Ecclesiastical degree, the Baccalaureate in Sacred Theology (STB) from Mater Ecclesiae, which has the faculties to award pontifical qualifications under the auspices of the Congregation for Catholic Education in Rome. The Rector is Mons Roderick Strange, former rector of Beda College, Rome.

== Allen Hall Coat of Arms ==
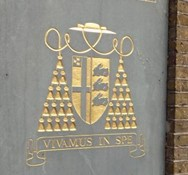
Coat of Arms for Allen Hall

The coat of arms of Allen Hall Seminary is a symbolic representation of its identity and mission, emphasizing its dedication to Christian doctrine, particularly the Trinity, and its historical heritage. It features a distinctive design of the three stars of St Edmund and three Conies of Cardinal Allen. Central to the emblem is a cross of St. George, representing the Christian faith. The inscription reads "Vivamus in Spe" which is Latin for "We live in hope". Surrounding the Coat of Arms is the Cardinal's hat or Galero worn by Cardinal Allen.

=== Elements of the Coat of Arms ===
The coat of arms consists of three main elements:

The Three Stars: These stars symbolize St. Edmund's theological teachings, focusing on the Holy Trinity. St. Edmund, renowned for his scholarly work, is attributed with writing a treatise on the Trinity, a doctrine central to Christianity that articulates the Father, the Son, and the Holy Spirit as three distinct entities within one divine essence. The stars in the coat of arms are a direct reflection of this triune concept.

The Cross of St. George: The seminary's ties to Douai College are represented by the Cross of St. George, a symbol commonly associated with England and English heraldry. This cross was a prominent feature in Douai College, evident in various artifacts, such as silverware. The college, affectionately referred to as 'Grandes Anglaises' by locals, underscores its strong English roots and influence.

The Three Conie Rabbits (Oryctolagus cuniculus)

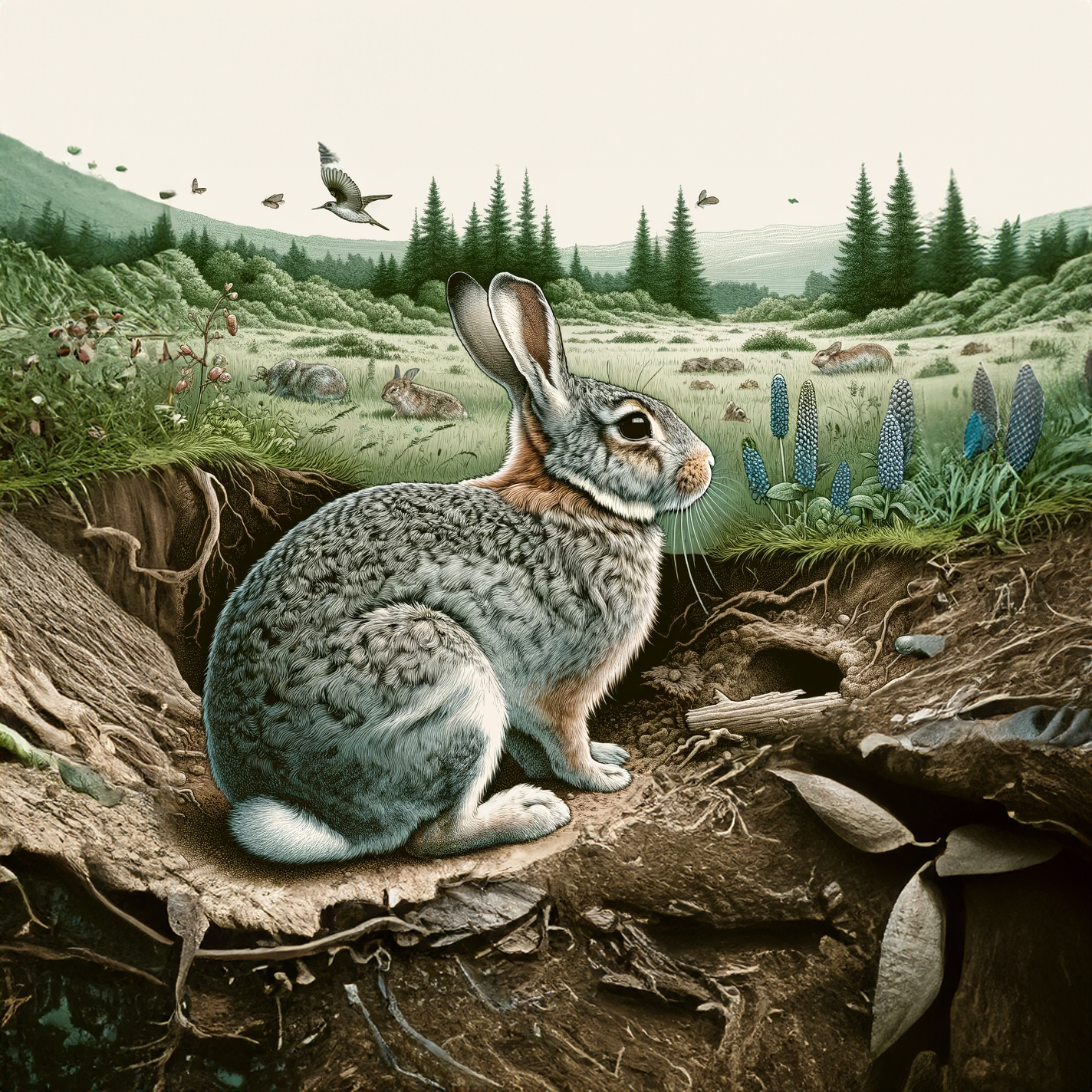
European Rabbit

The inclusion of three rabbits pays tribute to Cardinal William Allen, a pivotal figure in the seminary's history. His coat of arms featured conies, and his deep interest in the Holy Trinity is echoed in this symbolism. In medieval iconography, rabbits are frequently portrayed in a triangular formation, each holding the tail of another, signifying the Trinity and symbolizing the fruitfulness of this divine concept. This imagery can be observed in the medieval stained glass of Long Melford Church in Suffolk.

The following characteristics of the European Rabbit highlights why they were chosen to represent the seminary:

1. Adaptability and Resilience: European rabbits are known for their adaptability and resilience. They are nocturnal, spending days underground and foraging from evening until morning. They communicate through scent cues, touch, and thumping their hindlimbs to warn of danger. Their diet consists of a variety of vegetation.

2. Community Living: European rabbits are social animals living in groups, forming complex burrow systems called warrens.

3. Quiet Presence: They are generally silent but make loud screams when frightened or injured, indicating a quiet yet impactful presence

4. Fertility and Growth: Rabbits are symbolically associated with fertility and abundance

5. Vulnerability and Courage: As prey animals, rabbits are constantly aware of their vulnerability to various predators

=== Relevance to Seminary Formation ===
1. Adaptability and Resilience: The seminarians studying at the English College in Douai during Cardinal Allen’s time had to adapt to the challenges of religious persecution in England. The college was established in 1568 by William Allen and became a center for English Catholic exiles and a seminary for priests.

2. Community Living: The seminarians lived in a communal setting, sharing their lives with fellow students and teachers, which was central to their formation and provided a support network essential for their spiritual and emotional growth.

3. Quiet Presence: The seminarians were required to conduct their studies and ministry discreetly due to religious persecution. They operated covertly in England, ministering to Catholics and attempting re-conversion.

4. Fertility and Growth: They were dedicated to nurturing and growing the Catholic community through their studies and eventual ministry, symbolizing spiritual fertility.

5. Vulnerability and Courage: These seminarians faced significant risks, including persecution and martyrdom. Over 158 members of Douai College were martyred between 1577 and 1680 for their faith and commitment to the Catholic Church.

A comparison can be made between European rabbits and seminarians during Cardinal Allen's era illustrates similar traits of adaptability, communal living, quiet yet impactful presence, growth, and facing challenges with courage. Both groups, in their respective contexts, demonstrate resilience and the ability to thrive in challenging environments.

== See also ==
- Redemptoris Mater House of Formation
