= Jim Curry (bishop) =

English Catholic bishop (born 1960)

The Right Reverend James Curry
- Titular Bishop of Ramsbury
- Church: Roman Catholic Church
- Archdiocese: Westminster
- Province: Westminster
- See: Ramsbury
- Appointed: 22 April 2024
- Installed: 18 June 2024
- Other post: Auxiliary Bishop in Westminster

Orders
- Ordination: 17 May 1986 by Basil Hume
- Consecration: 18 June 2024 by Vincent Nichols

Personal details
- Born: James Curry; 1 June 1960 (age 66) Stepney, London
- Denomination: Roman Catholic

James Curry (born 1 June 1960) is an English prelate of the Roman Catholic Church. He was appointed as an auxiliary bishop of Westminster by Pope Francis on 22 April 2024.

== Biography ==
James Curry was born in Stepney, London on 1 June 1960. He completed his studies for the priesthood at Allen Hall Seminary and obtained his Baccalaureate in Theology at the Catholic University of Louvain.

He was ordained a priest for the Archdiocese of Westminster on 17 May 1986.

He held the following positions: Parish Vicar of Precious Blood in Edmonton (1986–1990); Parochial Vicar of St. Francis of Assisi of Notting Hill (1990–1994); Personal secretary to the Archbishop of Westminster, first to Cardinal Hume (1994–1999) and subsequently to Cardinal Murphy O'Connor (2000–2002); Parish Priest of Our Lady of Grace and St. Edward, Chiswick (2002–2008); Parish Priest of Our Lady of Victories in Kensington (since 2008); Episcopal Vicar of the Western Pastoral Area (2013–2016); since 2013, Chair of the Presbyteral Council; Chaplain of the Mayor of Kensington and Chelsea (2021–2022); Chaplain to the Lord Mayor of London (2020-21). Prior of the Westminster Section of the Equestrian Order of the Holy Sepulchre (KCHS) Trustee of the Friends of the Holy Land and Pilgrimage People.

He was consecrated bishop at Westminster Cathedral on 18 June 2024 by Cardinal Vincent Nichols with Archbishops Malcolm McMahon and George Stack as co-consecrators.

In September 2025, he delivered the homily at the funeral of Katharine, Duchess of Kent at Westminster Cathedral, the first Catholic royal funeral for over 300 years and the first royal funeral in the cathedral's history.
