= Edward Myers =

England international rugby union player

- Born: 23 September 1895 New York, United States
- Died: 29 March 1956 (aged 60) Bradford, England
- School: Dollar Academy

Rugby union career
- Position: Centre / Stand-off
International career
Years	Team	Apps	(Points)
1920–25	England	18	(13)

Edward Myers (23 September 1895 – 29 March 1956) was an English international rugby union player.

Myers was born in New York, while his parents were on a business trip, and boarded at the Dollar Academy.

Based in the north of England, Myers played his early rugby with Leeds club Headingley and earned Yorkshire representative honours before his career was paused at the outbreak of World War I, during which he served as a 2nd Lieutenant in the 6th Battalion, West Yorkshire Regiment.

Myers moved to Bradford RFC in 1919 and gained 18 England caps from 1920 to 1925. He was a centre in England's 1921 and 1923 grand slam-winning teams, then used at stand-off when they claimed the grand slam again in 1924.

== See also ==
- List of England national rugby union players
