= Máirín McAleenan =

Personal information
- Born: County Down, Northern Ireland

Sport
- Sport: Camogie
- Position: Centre half forward
Club
- Years: Club
- Leitrim Fontenoys
Inter-county
- Years: County
- Down

Máirín McAleenan is a camogie player from County Down. She won a Camogie All-Star award in 2004.

McAleenan was a member of the Down team that the National League Division 2 and the All Ireland Intermediate Championship in 1998, scoring 9-35 during the league campaign, 1–2 in the intermediate semi-final and 1–7 in the final.

At club level, she played with Leitrim Fontenoys when they won their first All Ireland Junior Club Championship in 2004. She also featured on the Down team beaten in the All Ireland junior final that year, scoring Down's second goal/
