= St George's Interdenominational Chapel, Heathrow Airport =

Coordinates: 51.4705°N 0.4537°W

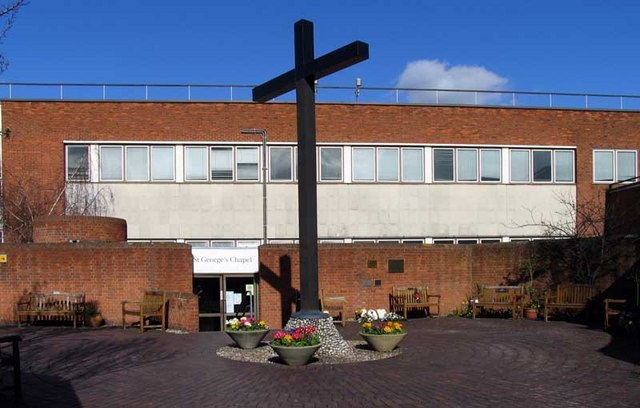
The chapel

St George's Interdenominational Chapel, Heathrow Airport is a place of worship in Heathrow Airport near London, in England. It was designed by Sir Frederick Gibberd. A prayer room and counselling room adjoin it.

The Heathrow Chaplaincy Team includes Christian chaplains from Anglican, Catholic, and Free Church denominations, and representatives from Muslim, Jewish, and other faiths.

== History and design ==
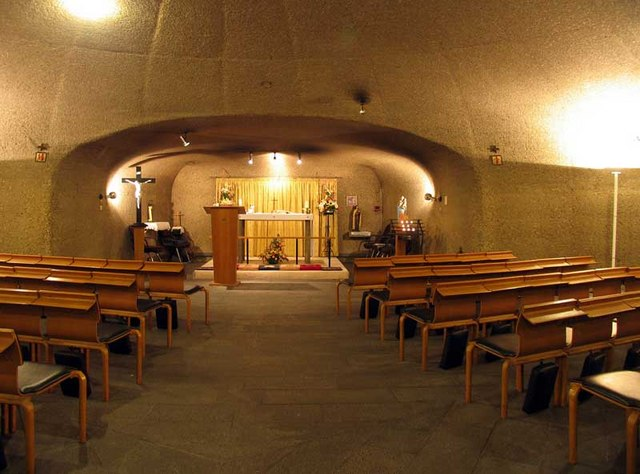
The altar of the chapel

The Chapel of St George was dedicated on 11 October 1968 as an Ecumenical Christian Chapel in the heart of London Heathrow Airport. Before then, chaplaincy work was pioneered by clergy from local parishes. The site, in the airport's geographical centre at the time, was provided by the then British Airports Authority (BAA), and funded largely by the Church of England (Anglican) and Roman Catholic and Free Churches.

The challenge for architect Jack Forrest, of Frederick Gibberd and Partners, was to produce an ecumenical chapel to accommodate Christian traditions, as well as a haven of peace and quiet. Its design is that of a vaulted crypt, reminiscent of the style and atmosphere of a crypt in the early Christian church; its underground setting isolates it from the airport's noise and bustle.

The three apses were originally intended for each of the contributing denominations; but in 1972 the main altar was rededicated by the Archbishop of Canterbury, the Cardinal Archbishop of Westminster, and the Moderator of the Free Church Federal Council for shared ecumenical use. The other apses now accommodate the Blessed Sacrament (the tabernacle has two separate compartments for Anglican and Roman Catholic traditions) and baptismal font.

The chapel is licensed for worship in accordance with the Places of Worship Registration Act 1855, with registration number 75203. On 1 May 1979 it was licensed for solemnising marriages according to the terms of the Marriage Act 1949.

== Worship and usage ==
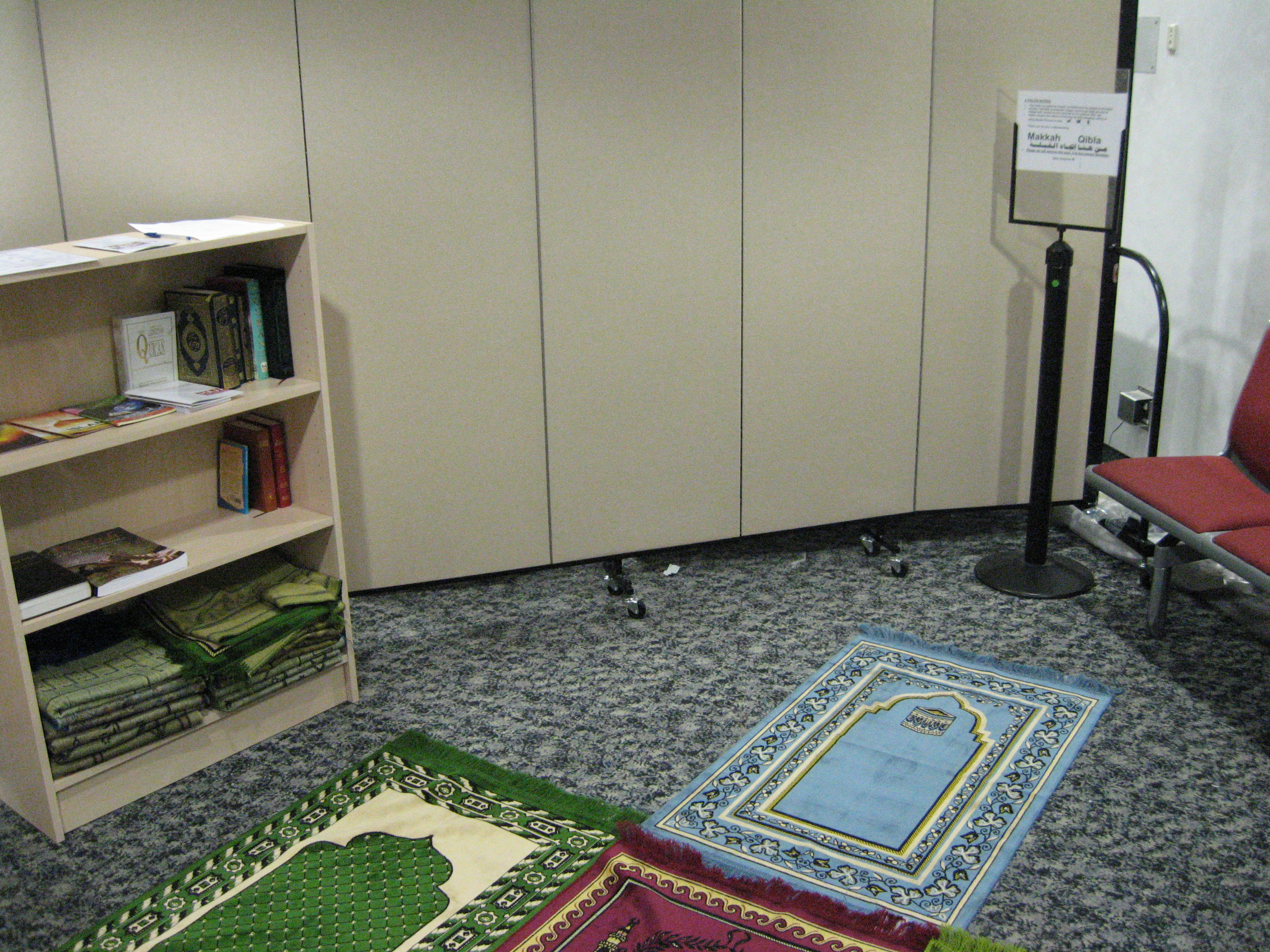
A prayer room furnished by the airport chapel in London Heathrow Airport

Regular services are held in the chapel, which functions as a community church. Additionally, other sacraments and services are held during the year by request and everyone is welcome to attend any of the public services.

Outside, the Memorial Garden is dominated by a 16-foot oak cross, and provides a place of rest and refreshment for staff and passengers. The walls of the garden support memorial plaques for late members of the airport community. On the opposite side of the garden is the ground level multifaith prayer room opened in 1998.

The Chaplains meet regularly for prayer; are on call 365 days a year, and are affiliated with the International Association of Civil Aviation Chaplains, covering airports throughout the world.

== Memorials ==
A plaque in memory of Barbara Jane Harrison was unveiled on 23 October 1970. There are also memorial plaques to mark the Lockerbie bombing – one for crew, on the wall by the door; another made by Dr Jim Swire near the font.
