= Vincent Nichols =

English Catholic prelate (born 1945)

His Eminence Vincent Gerard Nichols
- Cardinal, Archbishop Emeritus of Westminster
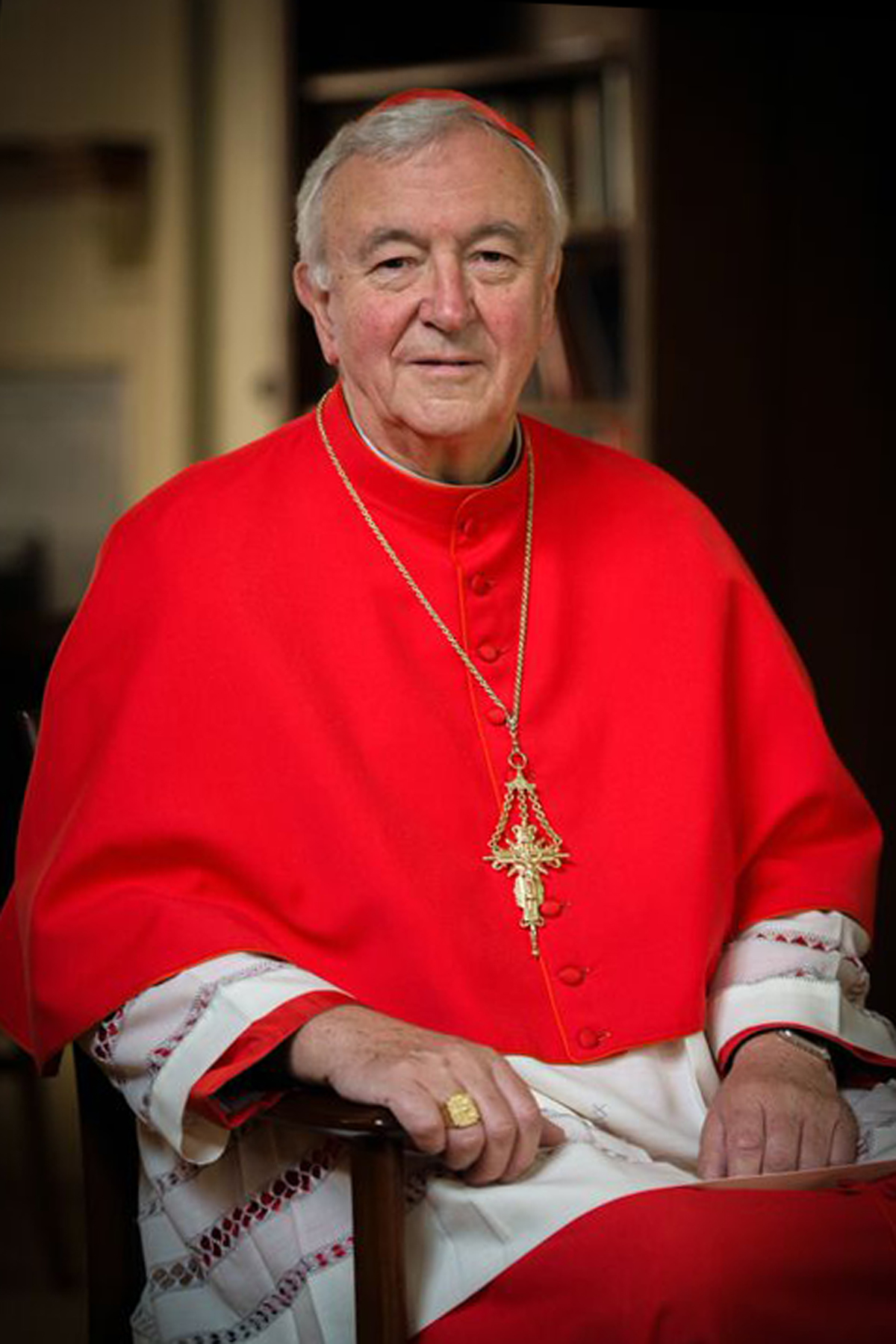
- Official portrait, 2015
- Church: Catholic Church
- Province: Westminster
- Diocese: Westminster
- Appointed: 3 April 2009
- Installed: 21 May 2009
- Term ended: 19 December 2025
- Predecessor: Cormac Murphy-O'Connor
- Successor: Richard Moth
- Other posts: Cardinal-Priest of Santissimo Redentore e Sant'Alfonso in Via Merulana; Chancellor of St Mary's University, Twickenham
- Previous posts: Auxiliary Bishop of Westminster & Titular Bishop of Othona (1991–2000); Archbishop of Birmingham (2000–2009)

Orders
- Ordination: 21 December 1969 by Paul Marcinkus
- Consecration: 24 January 1992 by Basil Hume
- Created cardinal: 22 February 2014 by Francis
- Rank: Cardinal-Priest

Personal details
- Born: Vincent Gerard Nichols; 8 November 1945 (age 81) Crosby, Lancashire, (Note: Crosby is now located in Merseyside since the county's creation in 1974) England
- Residence: Archbishop's House, Ambrosden Avenue, London
- Parents: Henry and Mary (née Russell) Nichols
- Motto: Fortis ut mors dilectio (Latin for 'Love is strong as death')
- Styles
- Reference style: His Eminence
- Spoken style: Your Eminence or Cardinal
- Informal style: Cardinal

Ordination history
History
Priestly ordination
- Date: 21 December 1969
Episcopal consecration
- Principal consecrator: Basil Hume
- Co-consecrators: Derek John Worlock, Alan Charles Clark
- Date: 24 January 1992
- Place: Westminster Cathedral
Cardinalate
- Elevated by: Pope Francis
- Date: 22 February 2014
Episcopal succession
Bishops consecrated by Vincent Nichols as principal consecrator
- David Christopher McGough: 8 December 2005
- John Sherrington: 14 September 2011
- Nicholas Gilbert Hudson: 4 June 2014
- Alan Williams: 1 July 2014
- Patrick McKinney: 3 July 2015
- James Curry: 18 June 2024

Vincent Gerard Nichols (born 8 November 1945) is an English Catholic prelate. A cardinal since 2014, he served as Archbishop of Westminster from 2009 to 2025. He was the Archbishop of Birmingham from 2000 to 2009 and was president of the Catholic Bishops' Conference of England and Wales.

On 8 November 2020, Nichols offered his customary resignation to Pope Francis on his 75th birthday. However, the Pontiff asked him to remain on as archbishop until the appointment of a successor. He participated in the 2025 papal conclave that elected Pope Leo XIV, describing the experience as "immensely peaceful". Pope Leo XIV accepted his resignation on 19 December 2025.

The Independent Inquiry into Child Sexual Abuse has criticised Nichols for claims of lack of personal responsibility, of compassion towards victims and for allegedly prioritizing the reputation of the Church above the suffering of victims. In response, an ecclesiastical spokesperson declared that Nichols would not be resigning his cardinalate following the inquiry's criticisms, as he was "determined to put it right".

== Early life and ministry ==
Vincent Gerard Nichols was born on 8 November 1945 in Crosby, a town near Liverpool, then located in Lancashire (Note: Crosby is now located in Merseyside since the county's creation in 1974) to Henry Joseph and Mary (née Russell) Nichols, both teachers. He said that he felt a calling to the priesthood as a teenager.

He attended St Peter and Paul's Junior School on Liverpool Road, Crosby before joining St Mary's College, Crosby, from 1956 to 1963. From St. Mary's he entered the Venerable English College, Rome. He was ordained priest for the Archdiocese of Liverpool on 21 December 1969. He obtained an STL in Theology & Philosophy from the Pontifical Gregorian University in 1970.

Upon his return to Britain, Nichols studied at the University of Manchester for a year and earned an MA degree in Theology in 1971, specialising in the theology of St. John Fisher. He then served as assistant pastor at St Mary's Church, Wigan, as well as chaplain to St John Rigby College, Wigan, and St Peter's Catholic High School, Wigan.

He received a MEd degree from Loyola University Chicago in 1974 and was assigned to St. Anne's Church in Edge Hill in 1975. Father Nichols spent a total of 14 years in the Liverpool archdiocese. In 1980, he was appointed director of the Upholland Northern Institute. He also sat on the archiepiscopal council.

Nichols served as General Secretary of the Catholic Bishops' Conference of England and Wales (CBCEW) from 1984 to 1993. In addition to his role within the CBCEW, he was moderator of the Steering Committee of the Council of Churches for Britain and Ireland from 1989 to 1996. He was chairman of the Catholic Education Service from 1998.

== Episcopal ministry ==
=== Auxiliary bishop of Westminster ===
On 5 November 1991, Nichols was appointed Auxiliary bishop of Westminster and Titular bishop of Othona by Pope John Paul II. He received his episcopal consecration on 24 January 1992 from Cardinal Basil Hume, OSB, with Archbishop Derek Worlock and Bishop Alan Clark serving as co-consecrators, at Westminster Cathedral.

At the age of 46, he was the youngest Catholic bishop in the United Kingdom. He selected as his episcopal motto: Fortis Ut Mors Dilectio, meaning, "Love Is Strong As Death" Song of Solomon 8:6.

As an auxiliary, Nichols served as vicar for North London. He was appointed to the finance advisory committee of the National Catholic Fund in 1994 and to the CBCEW's Committee for the Roman Colleges in 1995, and became Episcopal Liaison of the CBCEW for the National Conference of Diocesan Financial Secretaries in 1996.

In 1998, he was made chairman, of the CBCEW: Department for Catholic Education and Formation, as well as chairman of the Catholic Education Service. Nichols represented the European bishops at the November 1998 Synod of Bishops from Oceania, and was a special secretary at the Synod of Bishops for Europe in September 1999. He was celebrant of the Requiem Mass for Cardinal Hume in 1999.

=== Archbishop of Birmingham ===
On 15 February 2000, Nichols was appointed the eighth Archbishop of Birmingham by Pope John Paul II, succeeding the French-born Maurice Couve de Murville. He was installed as archbishop on the following 29 March. He received the pallium from Pope John Paul II in Rome on 29 June 2000, the Feast of Saints Peter and Paul, at the same time as Cormac Murphy-O'Connor received his as Metropolitan Archbishop of Westminster. Prior to his appointment to Birmingham, he had been considered a leading contender to replace the late Cardinal Hume as Archbishop of Westminster; the position went to Murphy-O'Connor, although Nichols would later succeed him.

In 2001, Nichols became chairman of the management board of the Catholic Office for the Protection of Children and Vulnerable Adults. He is also a patron of the International Young Leaders Network based at Blackfriars, Oxford. In 2008, he was named President of the Commission for Schools, Universities, and Catechesis in the Council of the Bishops' Conferences of Europe. He is the lead episcopal trustee of the three English seminaries outside the United Kingdom – The Royal English College, Valladolid, as well as the Beda College and the Venerable English Colleges in Rome. He is assisted in this role by two further episcopal trustees – Archbishop Arthur Roche, Secretary of the Congregation for Divine Worship and the Discipline of the Sacraments, and Mark Jabalé, Bishop Emeritus of Menevia. He undertakes at least one visitation of each of these seminaries in each academic year.

Nichols provided the commentary for the BBC's coverage of the funeral of Pope John Paul II in 2005.

By virtue of his status as ordinary of the Birmingham diocese, Nichols played a leading role in the cause of the Canonisation of John Henry Newman, which took place in 2019. In 2008 Nichols oversaw the opening of Newman's grave in Worcestershire, a practice usual in such cases, undertaken with a view to translating Newman's remains to the Birmingham Oratory. However, no human remains could be recovered. Likewise as archbishop, Nichols was Chairman of the Governing Body of Newman University College (now Newman University).

Nichols has written two books: Promise of Future Glory and Missioners; and it was he who set up the "Walk with Me" programme, which sought to bring people together in spiritual accompaniment through the seasons of the Church’s year. The initiative later spread to other dioceses.

=== Archbishop of Westminster ===
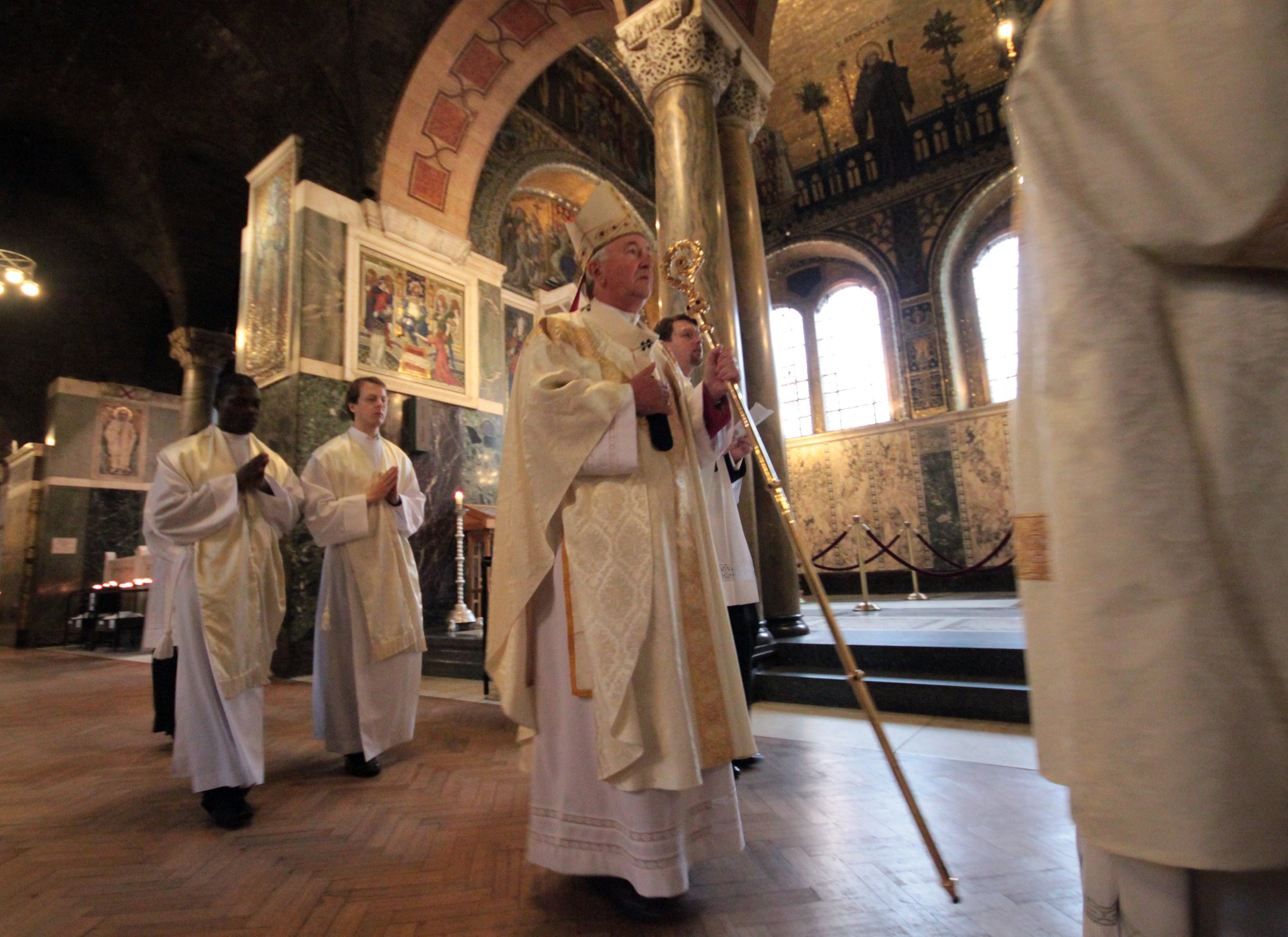
Nichols in Westminster Cathedral (2011)

Nichols was appointed the eleventh Archbishop of Westminster by Pope Benedict XVI on 3 April 2009, and solemnly installed on 21 May 2009. The diocese, the principal see of the Church in England and Wales, serves 472,600 Catholics. It was reported that Benedict XVI personally selected Nichols for the post after the Congregation for Bishops failed to reach a consensus.

In the time leading up to the appointment, Nichols' name had been repeatedly mentioned as a possible successor to Cardinal Cormac Murphy-O'Connor, and his name was the only one to be on both ternas, or shortlist of candidates submitted to the Congregation for Bishops. A group of English Catholic bishops, as well as a member of parliament, had even expressed their concerns of promoting Nichols to Westminster to the Apostolic Nuncio, Faustino Sainz Muñoz, citing the archbishop's ambition.

In his decision to accept the "daunting" role of Archbishop of Westminster, Nichols said he "just swallowed hard and said 'yes.'"

He succeeded Cardinal Murphy-O'Connor, who reached the mandatory retirement age of 75 in 2007. Cardinal Murphy-O'Connor described his successor as "competent, compassionate, and experienced."

As expected, Nichols was elected President of the Catholic Bishops' Conference of England and Wales by unanimous acclamation on 30 April 2009.

He received his second pallium from Pope Benedict XVI in Rome on 29 June 2009, the Feast of Saints Peter and Paul.

He was appointed a member of the Congregation for Bishops on 16 December 2013 by Pope Francis. On 19 February 2014. he was appointed a member of the Congregation for the Oriental Churches.

Nichols wrote to Pope Francis offering his resignation as archbishop as of his 75th birthday on 8 November 2020, as is customary; however, Pope Francis asked him to continue in his functions. Pope Leo XIV accepted Nichols' resignation on 19 December 2025, and appointed Richard Moth as his successor. Nichols' remarked that he was "delighted by the news". Nichols remained the apostolic administrator of the Archdiocese of Westminster until Moth was formally installed as archbishop.

=== Appointment to the College of Cardinals ===
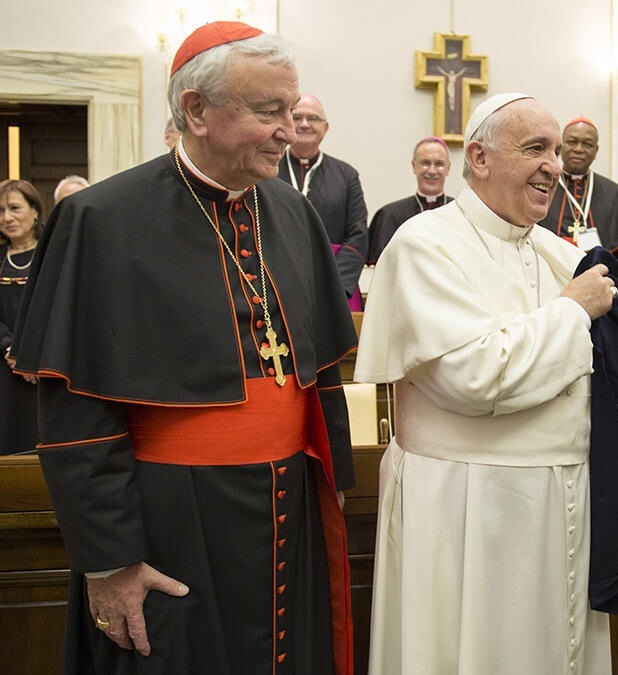
Cardinal Nichols with Pope Francis in 2014

On 12 January 2014 Pope Francis announced that Nichols would be created a cardinal at the consistory of the Church held on 22 February 2014. Cardinal Nichols was formally elevated to the Sacred College of Cardinals by Pope Francis on 22 February 2014, receiving the traditional red biretta and gold ring during a ceremony in Saint Peter's Basilica. He was created Cardinal-Priest of Santissimo Redentore e Sant'Alfonso in Via Merulana.

His coat of arms includes a blue wavy band on a silver shield to represent the River Mersey, scallop shells to represent the Venerable English College in Rome, the red rose of Lancashire and anchors representing Liverpool: surmounted by the customary red galero (ecclesiastical hat) with thirty red cords and tassels (for a cardinal).

On 8 September 2022, Nichols took part in the state funeral of Queen Elizabeth II. He gave thanks to Elizabeth II's "commitment to the Commonwealth throughout her reign", during a three-minute intercession. Nichols' presence represented the second time that the Archbishop of Westminster participated in a Royal funeral, in modern British history. It had previously occurred when Cormac Murphy-O'Connor participated in the funeral of Elizabeth the Queen Mother in 2002.

On 6 May 2023, Nichols attended the Coronation of King Charles III. Nichols' presence notably represented the first time that a Catholic prelate participated in the coronation of a British monarch since Elizabeth I was crowned by Catholic Bishop Owen Oglethorpe at the time of the Protestant Reformation.

Nichols took part as a cardinal elector in the 2025 papal conclave that elected Pope Leo XIV.

Nichols was sitting nearby when Prevost was asked if he accepted his election and which name he had chosen, Nichols said “He replied as calmly and clearly as you like,” he says. “This is a Pope with great stability of character and clarity of mind.”

He ceased to be a cardinal elector in any future conclave on 8 November 2025.

== Views ==
Once considered to be liberal, Nichols was described by Damian Thompson of The Daily Telegraph as having moved to more conservative positions. Elena Curti of The Tablet suggested this was the result of advice early in his career from Archbishop Worlock to make himself more "Vatican-friendly" if he was to get ahead in the Church hierarchy. Before his enthronement as Archbishop of Westminster, he was vocal in defending the public reputation of the Catholic Church, notably criticising the BBC for what he called "biased and hostile" programming, which contributed to the decision by the BBC not to show the animated sitcom Popetown.

In August 2010, Nichols expressed support for the echoes of Catholic social teaching emerging in the language of the new Coalition Government. In particular, he supported Prime Minister David Cameron's call for a "Big Society". Nichols said, "It gives us an experience of being together in a place that turns things on their head a bit". He expressed excitement at the potential for the Coalition and wrote that he had become disillusioned with the previous Labour government: "The last government was too overarching. In attempting to create a state that provided everything, it ended up losing touch with the people it was trying to serve." In April 2011, however, he was critical about the effectiveness of the Big Society, saying, "It is all very well to deliver speeches about the need for greater voluntary activity, but there needs to be some practical solutions. The Big Society [...] has no teeth [...] and should not be used as a cloak for masking central cuts"

Nichols defended the ban of the church on Communion for the divorced and remarried. He hoped that the Synod on the Family would clarify the teachings of the church on the Eucharist. He said that although usually one partakes in Communion based on one's own conscience, the divorced remarried publicly defied church teachings.

=== Church child abuse scandal ===
While he was Archbishop of Birmingham, he had to respond to the sexual abuse cases that were alleged in that diocese. Among his first public acts in his role as Archbishop of Westminster was a statement on the issue of clerical physical and sexual abuse in Ireland following a government report into the running of industrial schools. In his own words: "Every time there is a single incident of abuse in the Catholic Church it is a scandal. And I'm glad it's a scandal." He was, however, criticised widely on the issue of priests facing up to their crimes, where he claimed, "That takes courage, and also we shouldn't forget that this account today will also overshadow all of the good that they also did."

In 2020 the Independent Inquiry into Child Sexual Abuse said of Nichols, now a cardinal and the senior Catholic cleric in England and Wales, "There was no acknowledgement of any personal responsibility". Nichols, according to the report, protected the reputation of the Church rather than protecting victims and lacked compassion towards victims. A spokesperson for the Catholic Church in England and Wales stated that Nichols would not resign from his position following the report, since he was "determined to put it right".

=== Interfaith relations ===
Nichols played a prominent role in producing the 1996 CBCEW document, Common Good and Catholic Social Teaching, in which the English Catholic bishops condemned the rhetoric of greed in a move interpreted as an endorsement of New Labour.

In 2004, he prominently intervened in an argument pitching religious offence against artistic freedom when he criticised Birmingham Repertory Theatre for showing the play Behzti (Dishonour), which depicted scenes of sexual abuse and murder in a Sikh temple. He argued that the Sikh community had acted in a "reasonable and measured way" in representing their concerns. "Such a deliberate, even if fictional, violation of the sacred place of the Sikh religion demeans the sacred places of every religion. People of all faiths, therefore, will be offended by this presentation."

In March 2009, he allowed the Catholic chapel at a Roman Catholic college in Birmingham to be used for the commemoration of the birth of the Islamic prophet Muhammad with interfaith debate in the college chapel, sparking some local controversy. Nichols defended the location of the celebration, saying through his spokesman, "Christian/Muslim dialogue is an important part of the Catholic Church's agenda."

In November 2009, he "offered flowers at the altar to the deities" during a visit to the Hindu Temple in Neasden. When the action occasioned press comment, details of the episode were removed from the Diocese of Westminster's website.

==== Reception of former Anglicans ====
On 20 October 2009, Cardinal William Levada and Archbishop Joseph Di Noia held a press conference in which they announced that Pope Benedict XVI was preparing to release an apostolic constitution that would allow Anglicans, both laity and clergy, to join the Catholic Church in groups and maintain their corporate identity in new Personal Ordinariates for former Anglicans entering the Roman Catholic Church.

A joint statement on the new protocol from Nichols and the Anglican Communion's head, Archbishop Rowan Williams of Canterbury, was issued at the same time in London. The joint statement said that the development reflected "substantial overlap in faith, doctrine and spirituality between the Catholic Church and the Anglican tradition" and affirmed "on-going official dialogue between the Catholic Church and the Anglican Communion", including the Anglican Roman Catholic International Commission (ARCIC) and International Anglican Roman Catholic Commission for Unity and Mission (IARCCUM).

However, Canon Giles Fraser, an Anglican canon of St Paul's Cathedral, preaching at an ecumenical service at Nichols' own cathedral in Westminster, suggested "...there are some – and indeed in both Churches – who do not see it like this at all. For from the Anglican perspective, this new invitation to swim the Tiber can sometimes have a slightly predatory feel; in corporate terms, a little like a takeover bid in some broader power play of church politics."

=== Traditional Catholic rites and sacraments ===
Following the ascent of Arthur Roche to the Congregation for Divine Worship and the Discipline of the Sacraments and his "clarifying" Responsa ad Dubia supplement to Traditionis custodes, Nichols moved to prohibit the celebration of the Sacrament of Confirmation in the Archdiocese of Westminster according to the traditional Latin rites of the Catholic Church, as they were celebrated before the institution of the Novus Ordo in 1971 (created after Vatican II). This affected the annual traditional Catholic confirmations at St James's, Spanish Place in London (part of the archdiocese of Westminster), where, before 2022, they had been celebrated under indult for the last 20 years. This put Nichols at variance with the Latin Mass Society, though confirmations in pre-Vatican II rites continue in England and Wales through the schismatic Society of St. Pius X and the Eastern Catholic Churches.

In February 2024 Nichols announced that the Latin mass planned for the Paschal Triduum, that had annually been held at St. Mary Moorfields, would be cancelled. This would result in the first time since the 1990s that the Triduum would not be celebrated in the archdiocese according to the old rites.

=== Homosexuality ===
Nichols supported the effort to have Catholic adoption agencies exempted from sexual orientation regulations. His position was qualified by his statement during a BBC interview that he would not oppose adoption by a gay person that was single. Mary Ann Sieghart, a journalist, commenting for The Times on Nichols' statements on the subject, observed that "had the Catholic position been more hardline, it might have stood more of a chance."

In 2012 Nichols condemned same-sex marriage proposals, calling it an "undemocratic, Orwellian shambles". Nichols also told teachers at Catholic schools that they could not marry divorced people, enter into civil unions or same-sex marriages and yet retain their jobs. In 2013, Cardinal Nichols, under pressure from the Vatican, put an end to Masses for LGBT people at the historic 18th-century Our Lady of the Assumption Church in Warwick Street, Soho. Cardinal Nichols arranged, however, for the LGBT community to move to the Church of the Immaculate Conception, Farm Street in nearby Mayfair and attended their first Mass there in 2013. The Our Lady of the Assumption Church in Warwick Street, Soho, has since been used for the Anglican Form of the Roman Rite by the Personal Ordinariate of Our Lady of Walsingham.

Archbishop Nichols said: "The moral teaching of the Church is that the proper use of our sexual faculty is within a marriage, between a man and a woman, open to the procreation and nurturing of new human life."

=== Education ===
In 2006, Nichols denounced then-Secretary for Education Alan Johnson's plan to introduce a quota for non-Catholic pupils at Catholic schools as "insulting", "divisive" and "ill-thought-out, unworkable and contradictory of empirical evidence". He mobilised over 2,000 Catholic school headteachers in his campaign and the plan was eventually dropped.

In August 2009, he warned that in his view the overuse by young people of online social networking websites (such as Facebook and MySpace) encouraged teenagers to build "transient relationships" that can leave them traumatised and even suicidal when they collapse: "We're losing some of the ability to build interpersonal communication that's necessary for living together and building a community."

=== Prison chaplaincy ===
In October 2010 Nichols made a defence of Catholic prison chaplaincy in a speech at HM Prison Brixton in London. He criticised suggestions that amid budget cuts the state should only fund a single "generic chaplaincy" in British prisons. He said:

There are some today who seem to see a future with some sort of 'generic chaplaincy', providing spiritual support irrespective of the church family of the person, as part of a package of care and rehabilitation to all ... That is, of course, valuable and no chaplain would or should turn away any person who seeks help. But where I part company from such thinking is in the idea that a generic approach can ever be truly respectful or sufficient.

=== Petition ===
In 2011, Nichols and former MP Ann Widdecombe supported a petition to stop the owners of a London pub from changing its name. "The Cardinal", near Westminster Cathedral, was due to be renamed the "Windsor Castle" when it reopened after refurbishment. More than 150 people signed the petition organised by the Independent Catholic News newspaper. The pub had been named after a former Cardinal Archbishop of Westminster, Henry Edward Manning. Nichols said that although the pub was originally called the Windsor Castle, the name the Cardinal has a better historical connection to the area and that "The reason why it was changed was because of the great impact that Cardinal Manning had on the life of London". Despite the petition, the pub was renamed.

=== Poverty ===
Nichols has urged Catholic academics, charities, politicians, theologians and lay Catholics to work towards the "Church for the poor" that Pope Francis advocated. Nichols believes society has a moral imperative

(…) to attend first to those who are most vulnerable, and at present that includes rising numbers of children. (…) there are growing numbers of hungry pupils in classrooms across the [UK] country and many accounts of parents foregoing their own meals to provide for their children. (…) A social safety net that fails to protect essentials such as food and shelter for those who cannot work, is not worthy of being regarded as a safety net at all.

Nichols stressed the need for fair wages, stating the private sector, the social sector, the state and all who have people depending on them for a livelihood are challenged by this.

Nichols argued in 2014 that government changes to social security had "torn apart" the "basic safety net" for very poor families and called them a "disgrace". He claimed that people are risking "destitution" and that the administration of social security has become steadily more "punitive", forcing people to rely on food banks and leaving them with nothing if forms are filled in incorrectly.

So, if applicants don't get it right then they have to wait and they have to wait for 10 days, for two weeks – with nothing, with nothing. And that's why the role of food banks has become so crucial for so many people in Britain today. And for a country of our affluence that quite frankly is a disgrace.

He is the patron of the Passage, a day centre for homeless people founded by the Daughters of Charity near Westminster Cathedral.

=== Immigration ===
As Cardinal Nichols, he spoke out against the use of arguments and campaigns which stoke up "distress" about foreigners coming to the UK. His comments came amid a furore over a £1.5 million advertising campaign by the UK Independence Party which includes billboards suggesting to people that millions of foreigners are after their jobs.

=== Seafarers' welfare ===
During a visit to the port of Tilbury in June 2015, Cardinal Nichols paid tribute to seafarers' professionalism and dedication and the sacrifices they make to support their families. He said that the Church, through its maritime mission agency, the Apostleship of the Sea, would continue to support their faith and welfare needs.

== Acknowledgement of adoption controversy ==
On 3 November 2016, it was reported that Cardinal Nichols officially acknowledged that the Roman Catholic Church in England and Wales had pressed young, unmarried mothers in the country to put their children up for adoption in agencies linked to the Catholic Church throughout the decades following World War II and offered an apology.

== Personal life ==
Nichols is a lifelong fan of Liverpool F.C..

== Distinctions ==
- Bailiff Grand Cross of the Sacred Military Constantinian Order of Saint George

== See also ==
- Cardinals created by Francis

Catholic Church titles
Preceded by Maurice Noel Leon Couve de Murville	Archbishop of Birmingham; 15 February 2000–21 May 2009	Succeeded by Bernard Longley
Preceded by Cormac Murphy-O'Connor	Archbishop of Westminster; 21 May 2009–19 December 2025	Succeeded by Richard Moth
Preceded by Cormac Murphy-O'Connor	President of Bishops' Conference of England and Wales; 2009–2026	Succeeded by Richard Moth
Preceded by Anthony Joseph Bevilacqua	Cardinal Priest of Santissimo Redentore e Sant'Alfonso in Via Merulana; 22 February 2014–present	Incumbent
