= Tickle (surname) =

Tickle is an English toponymic surname, derived from Tickhill in Yorkshire. Notable people with the surname include:

- Charlie Tickle (1883 – after 1919), English footballer
- Cheryll Tickle, British biologist
- Danny Tickle (born 1983), English rugby league footballer
- David Tickle, British record producer and engineer
- Gerard William Tickle (1909–1994), English prelate
- Jon Tickle (born 1974), British TV presenter
- Phyllis Tickle (1934–2015), American author and lecturer
- Sam Tickle (born 2002), English professional footballer
- Steven Ray Tickle, American television personality on Moonshiners and Tickle.

== See also ==
- Tickle (disambiguation)
- Mr. Tickle, the first book in the Mr. Men series by Roger Hargreaves
- Tickell
