= Tickle (disambiguation) =

Tickling is the act of touching a part of a person’s body lightly so as to cause him/her to move involuntarily or make him/her laugh.

Tickle, tickles, or tickling may also refer to:

- Tickle (surname), a list of people with the surname Tickle
- Mr. Tickle, a book by Roger Hargreaves
- Tickle the Doodat, a character from the Hooley Dooleys
- Tickle.com, a former interpersonal media company providing self-discovery and social networking services
- Trout tickling, a method of fishing by hand
- Titanium tetrachloride, a chemical compound (TiCl_{4})
- Tcl, a pronunciation of the name of the scripting language
- Gudgudee, a 1997 Indian film that translates as Tickle
- Tickle (TV series), a TV series named after Steven Ray Tickle
- Tickled, a 2016 documentary by David Farrier
- "Tickles" (song), a song by Swedish singer Elin Lanto
- Tickling fetishism, a type of fetish involving light touching
- Tickler file after Tickle, a term used in law offices to look at something or give someone a reminder in the future

== Newfoundland ==
A tickle is a short narrow strait in Newfoundland English. Numerous places have "tickle" in their name, including:

- Tickles, Newfoundland and Labrador, a small settlement
- Leading Tickles, a town in Newfoundland and Labrador
- Tickle Bay, somewhere off the island of Newfoundland

== See also ==
- Tickell
- List of tickles
