= Catenian Association =

Roman Catholic lay society

The Catenian Association
- Named after: Catena (Latin meaning chain)
- Formation: 1908
- Founded at: Manchester
- Type: Catholic fraternal society
- Headquarters: 5 Oak Court, Pilgrims Walk, Prologis Park, Coventry CV6 4QH
- Members: 8,000 +
- Main organ: Great Britain National Council
- Affiliations: Roman Catholic Church, Catholic Military Association, Catholic Medical Association, Catholic Women's League
- Website: www.thecatenians.com

The Catenian Association is a Roman Catholic lay society with around 8,000 members (known as "brothers") in a number of English-speaking countries. Catenian men and their families meet socially to help develop their faith and build lasting friendships. It has been described as "an international brotherhood of Catholic men" and a "Catholic fellowship for members of the professions." The Catenian Association has been depicted as one of the "older" Catholic movements that remains in existence.

== History ==
It was founded in Manchester in 1908, through the initiative of Bishop Louis Charles Casartelli, Bishop of Salford, to encourage Catholic professional and business men to associate for mutual self-help, and to develop social and family bonds. Bishop Casartelli had a particular emphasis on Catholic Action. It was founded with the leadership of stockbroker, John O'Donnell. The Association's exclusion of priests elicited suspicion; however, bishops were pleased to observe the establishment of a Catholic middle class in their predominantly impoverished dioceses. A new class of prosperous Roman Catholics emerged in Lancashire at the turn of the 20th century (many of Irish Catholic origin), which spurred its creation. Originally known as 'The Chums Benevolent Association,' it adopted its current name in 1910. The title originates from 'catena,' which is the Latin word for 'chain.'

The Catenians adopted the scheme created by the publisher Vincent Wareing for the release of the Catenian edition of The Catholic Encyclopaedia in 1915.

In The Final Whistle: The Great War in Fifteen Players, Stephen Cooper refers to a growing Catholic middle class that made its presence felt through organisations such as the Catenians, and sought to counter Liberal government threats to voluntary, such as Catholic, schools. This comprised a closely connected and cohesive group of Britons.

A report by TIME in 1925 highlighted that the Lord Mayor of London, Alfred Bower, and Cardinal Bourne, Archbishop of Westminster, both declined an invitation to attend a meeting of the Catenians in the City of London. The reason given was that the event's program gave a toast to Pope Pius XI, preceding King George V. The Catholic Herald, which took umbrage at the snub, sided with the Catenians.

Fr. (later Bishop) John Petit, who served as Master of St. Edmund's College, Cambridge University, from 1934-1946, made energetic attempts at raising funds for the college. They were a notable aspect of his tenure as Master, though they did not always achieve the desired outcomes. For instance, in March 1936, an appeal was published in Catena. He depended partly on the Catenians for support to fund a Catholic chaplaincy. Despite over a year of preparation, the first month’s efforts yielded only £36-7-0. The appeal was reissued, and by mid-October, the total had increased to £52-6-6, with £20 of that amount contributed by only two donors. The outcome was deeply disheartening for him.

The Catholic Industrialists’ Conference was launched in 1937, and convened twice a year. This gathering was primarily organised by the Catenians, operating under the umbrella of the Catholic Social Guild. Many Catenians were involved in the Catholic Social Guild, and their enthusiasm for promoting Catholic social teachings played a crucial role in establishing these semi-annual meetings. The initiative aimed to put into practice Pope Pius XI’s directive that “the Apostles of the industrial and commercial world should themselves be employers and merchants.”

In 1944, J.R.R. Tolkien co-founded the Oxford Circle of the Catenians, and was the branch's first vice-president. He also served as its president. Early, rough drafting of passages that appear in The Lord of the Rings were made on paper bearing the letterhead of the Catenians' Oxford Circle.

Frank Pakenham (7th Earl of Longford) was another prominent member.

During the mid 20th century, the English Catenians liaised with the Knights of St. Columbanus in Ireland to support suffering Irish immigrants, incentivised by Irish Archbishop, John Charles McQuaid. The former manager of Manchester United, Matt Busby, had been noted in a biography as "an enthusiastic member of the Catenian Association, a sort of Catholic freemasonry." In 1964, the Catenians offered to raise £1,000,000 for the establishment of Catholic chaplaincies in English universities, but this was rejected.

In January 1997, the Labour MP and barrister, Gerry Bermingham, revealed at a select committee meeting that he had been a member of the Catenians.

In 1999, the Independent reported that officials from the UK Home Office had grown uneasy about the perceived clandestine operations of the Catenians. A detailed analysis compiled by the House of Commons' Home Affairs Committee had drawn attention to anxieties that individuals affiliated with the Catenian Association, believed to encompass senior figures within the judiciary and law enforcement, may have been leveraging their authority to alter the outcomes of legal proceedings. The Association’s alleged involvement surfaced during an extensive two-year inquiry into broader Freemasonry, led by the Committee.

In 2005, the Cardinal Stafford addressed the Catenians.

The organisation held centenary celebrations in 2008. By this time, it was active in Australia, Great Britain, Ireland, Malta, South Africa, Zambia and Zimbabwe.

As of 2015, it had approximately 290 local groups in the UK, including a circle in the City of London.

In 2018, George Kazs became the first Australian to lead the society. In June 2019, the Catenians launched a members' publication, titled The Catindian. In Great Britain, it publishes the Catena magazine.

Former Australian Prime Minister, Tony Abbott, has been listed as a longtime member.

As of 2022, former England international rugby player Chris Jones was active in the Knutsford Circle of the Catenians. The 693rd Lord Mayor of London, Vincent Keaveney, has been a registered member of the Catenians' Westminster Circle. Robert Rigby, who became Lord Mayor of the City of Westminster in 2024, is also a member.

== Organisation ==
The Catenian Association has its headquarters in Coventry, in the centre of England, and is administered by three National Councils: Great Britain (also including Ireland for administrative purposes), Australia, and an International Council representing Malta, India, Zimbabwe, Zambia, Bangladesh and the Holy Land. The Association Secretary is the co-ordinating officer for these three bodies which each have their own National Secretary.

In Great Britain, Australia and Malta, Circles are grouped into Provinces with Provincial officers and administration drawn from the Circles. In countries where Circles are fewer in number or geographically widely spread, the International Council fulfils this role. Each Province elects a Director who is appointed to their National Council for three years. In Great Britain, there are currently 300 local Circles grouped into 21 Provinces. As of 2002, it was also present in Hong Kong.

Each local Circle bears a name and number, the name being geographical, and the numbers being sequential in order of foundation. Each Circle is led by a President, assisted by Circle officers. The previous President has the title "Immediate Past President" and holds a special status as such. Each Circle also has a "Provincial Councillor" as official representative to the Province.

The 1990 book Inside the Brotherhood describes the Catenian Association and Opus Dei as "quasi-Masonic."

== Ethos ==
Catenian life is based on friendship, which is developed through monthly meetings and a varied social programme. The Catenians are a network of Catholic men (often with their wives as guests) who meet regularly to enjoy each other's company and to help and support each other around the world. Membership offers friendship and support to Catholic men (culturally Catholic, contemplative or more orthodox in outlook) at all stages of their lives, whether married or single. The monthly meeting is intended to provide a time for relaxed enjoyment and a light-hearted environment in which friendships flourish. "We enjoy the good times together and help each other through the bad times... Catenians are an international social network that provide an oasis of calm for busy working families."

This friendship is based on a shared faith and is enjoyed by their wives (whether Catholic or not), and their children, and continues after a member's death with widows being supported and involved on a continuing basis. Although a Catholic lay society, it has no political, ecumenical or theological objectives as an association, but is more an association of "Brothers" (as members are termed). Brothers try to help one another, and their families, as much as they can. Whatever difficulties arise in life, there will be members and their wives committed to help. If a member suffers financial difficulties, a Benevolent Fund can provide assistance.

== Activities and Charity ==
Local Circles arrange activities both for their members and their families. Meals together, barbecues, picnics, visits to the theatre and sporting events are all popular.

Around £300,000 a year is raised for local and national charities by Circles through their Presidents' charities. The Association supports charitable and other good works in a number of ways. It has two chief charitable funds of its own: a welfare fund ('The Benevolent Fund') for the support of its own members and their families, and a bursary fund ('The Bursary Fund') offering financial help to young people in projects contributing to wider society at home and abroad. Bursaries are available to young people who undertake voluntary work in developing countries. Funds are also raised for a number of projects including providing clean water in Africa. At local level, Catenians are active in their parishes, supporting Parish Priests and fellow parishioners.

Golf societies throughout the Association join together in a National Golf Championship week every year and the Catenian Caravan and Camping Fellowship have a wide range of activities.

The Catholic Medical Association, the Catholic Women's League, as well as the Catholic Military Association (for members of the UK Armed Forces) are affiliated to the Catenians.

In 2024, the Times of Malta reported that the Catenians had funded voluntary work by university students in Africa.

== Regalia ==
The regalia worn by members is simple. Badges of office are worn by Circle Presidents and officers around the neck, suspended from collars of gold and white ribbon. There are equivalent badges for Provincial officers and national officers. Breast jewels are optionally worn by members on formal occasions, suspended from coloured ribbons, on the breast of the jacket, to indicate membership, long service, and past participation in conferences and structures of the organisation. Regalia sashes are also worn. Regalia has been simplified in modern times, from its more complex origins and a number of Circles have ceased to use them or limit regalia at meetings to the Circle President and any visitors who qualify.

== Changing Perceptions ==
Within the Roman Catholic Church the Catenian Association has sometimes in the past been characterised as having a perceived middle-class exclusivity. This criticism was most famously voiced more than fifty years ago at the Association's own annual conference in 1966 when the Roman Catholic Bishop of Arundel and Brighton, David Cashman, challenged the membership to re-examine its aims and objectives, and criticised it for being "a section of the people of God dressed for dinner and dancing".

Since then, the Association has worked to overcome this perception, with relaxation of its regulations, increased scope for local Circles to admit a wider variety of members, extensive involvement of women as guests at meetings and social events, recruiting from every kind of social background, and establishing partnerships with other lay organisations such as the Catholic Military Association. In May 2014, Grand President Bob Butler addressed the annual conference in Liverpool, referring to the 1908 founders of the association, and saying "They engaged with the world in which they lived. Surely, they would expect us to engage with the world in which we live?.....Some may be fearful, but I suggest that we have much to gain, and much to offer the Church by moving on."

In his 2016 memoir, the English actor and comedian, Steve Coogan, claimed that much of the Catenians' membership "are wealthy businessmen. Rightly or wrongly, it has a reputation for having an air of elitism."
