= List of Moonshiners episodes =

Moonshiners is an American docudrama television series on the Discovery Channel that dramatizes the life of people who produce (illegal) moonshine in the Appalachian Mountains of Kentucky, North Carolina, South Carolina, Tennessee, and Virginia. The series dramatizes their liquor production efforts, law-evading techniques and lives.

The series premiered on December 6, 2011. The fifteenth and most recent season premiered on January 6, 2026.

== Series Overview ==
| Season | Episodes | Specials | Originally released | | Average rating (millions) |
| Season | Episodes | Specials | First released | Last released | Average rating (millions) |
|---|---|---|---|---|---|
| 1 | 6 | 1 | December 6, 2011 | January 4, 2012 | 2.76 |
| 2 | 12 | 3 | November 7, 2012 | January 30, 2013 | 3.03 |
| 3 | 13 | 7 | November 5, 2013 | February 4, 2014 | 2.53 |
| 4 | 14 | 10 | November 4, 2014 | February 3, 2015 | 2.00 |
| 5 | 17 | 1 | November 17, 2015 | March 8, 2016 | 1.85 |
| 6 | 17 | 5 | November 15, 2016 | March 14, 2017 | TBA |
| 7 | 18 | 12 | November 15, 2017 | March 27, 2018 | 1.59 |
| 8 | 18 | 10 | December 11, 2018 | July 9, 2019 | TBA |
| 9 | 17 | 4 | November 19, 2019 | May 9, 2020 | TBA |
| 10 | 20 | 7 | November 23, 2020 | April 13, 2021 | TBA |
| 11 | 21 | 2 | October 20, 2021 | March 30, 2022 | TBA |
| 12 | 20 | 5 | November 2, 2022 | April 10, 2023 | TBA |
| 13 | 16 | 3 | December 26, 2023 | May 21, 2024 | TBA |
| 14 | 16 | 2 | November 5, 2024 | March 11, 2025 | TBA |
| 15 | 16 | 3 | January 6, 2026 | April 21, 2026 | TBA |

- is the number of the specials which aired during that season.

== Episodes ==
=== Season 1 (2011–12) ===
| No. overall | No. in season | Title | Original release date | US viewers (millions) |
|---|---|---|---|---|
| 1 | 1 | "Moonshine Season Starts" | December 6, 2011 | 2.832 |
Two partners (Tim and Tickle) scout for a site for their moonshining operation, and an ABC agent discovers counter-surveillance measures.
| 2 | 2 | "Point of No Return" | December 7, 2011 | 2.856 |
Tim and Tickle begin operating their still for the first time, which goes smoothly until an emergency strikes; a law enforcement agent pursues a hot tip.
| 3 | 3 | "The Law Comes Knockin'" | December 14, 2011 | 2.578 |
Equipment failure and an intruder threaten moonshiner Tim and his partner Tickle's first run of moonshine. Law enforcement agent Jesse Tate shuts down an illegal drinking establishment. Veteran moonshiner Popcorn Sutton shows his old-fashioned way of producing moonshine.
| 4 | 4 | "Outlaw Brotherhood" | December 21, 2011 | 2.791 |
Moonshiner Tim and his partner Tickle fix up Tim's car and use it to transport some moonshine. A hurricane threatens their still site.
| 5 | 5 | "A Price to Pay" | December 28, 2011 | 2.618 |
In the late fall, moonshiner Tim adds a second pot to the still site, trying to double his profits. Tickle falls while working and breaks three ribs. Agent Jesse tries to arrest people.
| 6 | 6 | "A Moonshiner's Farewell" | January 4, 2012 | 2.899 |
Popcorn Sutton commits suicide. Tim and Tickle produce moonshine day and night, making more money than Tim has ever made before. Agent Jesse conducts reconnaissance of an active still site.
Special
| 7 | Special | "Cannonball Run" | April 18, 2012 | 1.343 |
Tim and Tickle plan a risky midday transfer.

=== Season 2 (2012–13) ===
| No. overall | No. in season | Title | Original release date | US viewers (millions) |
|---|---|---|---|---|
| 8 | 1 | "Rise 'n Shine!" | November 7, 2012 | 3.06 |
Moonshine season in Appalachia has begun. Tim and Tickle are starting to try to produce some moonshine. A new law enforcement officer, Deputy Sheriff Chuck, is introduced.
| 9 | 2 | "Moonshine Goldmine" | November 14, 2012 | 2.23 |
Josh and Bill make progress building their underground still. Mark and Jeff build a new copper still and go into the mountains to establish a new site. Tickle lures Tim back to their illegal site.
| 10 | 3 | "Moonshiner Vs. Hogzilla" | November 21, 2012 | 2.48 |
Mark and Jeff call in moonshiner Jim Tom to help fix their broken still. Mark hunts and kills a wild hog. Meanwhile, Deputy Sheriff Chuck gets a tip from a hunter that leads him to an abandoned site.
| 11 | 4 | "Storm's a Brewing" | November 28, 2012 | 2.36 |
A storm hits the Carolinas, and Jeff, Mark and Jim Tom produce moonshine during the storm. Nearby, Josh and Bill experience the same storm, and a flood threatens their underground still site. Then, Tickle does something. The episode includes news stories about some moonshining arrests, an ongoing tropical storm and Barney Barnwell's documentary.
| 12 | 5 | "A Shiner's Last Stand" | December 5, 2012 | 2.19 |
Tickle splits from Tim, recruits Howard as a new still hand, and heads into the woods to find a new site. Mark, Jeff and Jim Tom begin work on a second still to make barley-based liquor, but needs his wife and son to run the second site. Deputy Sheriff Chuck meets a confidential informant to get information about the drop-off location for an active moonshine operation. Josh and Bill make repairs to their underground still site.
| 13 | 6 | "Prophecy Fulfilled" | December 12, 2012 | 3.43 |
Tickle builds a new still and does something around midnight. Josh gets angry when he damages the nearly completed underground still site. Mark and Jeff make a risky move when they sell some of their product in town. Jim Tom teaches Jeff's son Lance how to measure the alcohol content of moonshine.
| 14 | 7 | "Tickle Goes Rogue" | December 19, 2012 | 3.65 |
Tickle works alone after his still hand Howard gets spooked by an intruder and disappears. Josh and Bill discover toxic black mold in their underground still site. Jeff's wife and son set up a second still to run barley "scotch". Deputy Sheriff Chuck tries to catch moonshiners.
| 15 | 8 | "Troubled Waters" | January 2, 2013 | 3.46 |
Tickle gets discovered by an angry landowner, while Tim devises a new hiding spot for his back-up stash of moonshine. Josh and Bill get into a bone-breaking fight at their new still site. Mark carries moonshine by canoe at night.
| 16 | 9 | "Adios, Mr. Still" | January 9, 2013 | 3.30 |
Gunfire erupts in the bamboo patch just as Josh and Bill fire up their still for the first time in the season. Meanwhile, Jeff, Mark and Jim Tom make a batch of rye whiskey in the style of President George Washington. Tickle's still is sabotaged.
| 17 | 10 | "Moonshine Treasure Hunt" | January 16, 2013 | 3.18 |
Tim hunts for 200 gallons of high-value 60-year-old moonshine at the bottom of a lake. Mark and Jeff encounter a thief stealing their moonshine. Mike and Tweedy hide moonshine under a pile of cattle manure. Tickle has some interaction with his old still hand Howard.
| 18 | 11 | "Hat in Hand" | January 23, 2013 | 3.17 |
In debt to dangerous people, Tickle goes to Tim for help. Jeff, Mark and Jim Tom struggle with a nest of yellow jackets at their still site. Josh comes to Cutie Pie's rescue when she gets hurt at the underground still.
| 19 | 12 | "Last Shiner Standing" | January 30, 2013 | 3.87 |
As Tim gets ready to switch to making legal liquor, Tickle loads their last batch of illegal moonshine into an RV's water tank to sell to waiting customers. Josh and Bill's above-ground still malfunctions, ending their season, but they find that their underground site is now mold-free and ready to use during the winter. Jeff, Mark, and Jim Tom run three stills at once, and Deputy Sheriff Chuck arrests the suspect he has been pursuing all season. This episode was dedicated in memory of Darrin Lewis, Mike's brother.
Specials
| 20 | Special | "Secret Summit Part 1" | February 6, 2013 | N/A |
In part 1 of this two-part special, the moonshiners meet in a secluded cabin for an interview with executive producer Matthew Ostrom. They talk about run-ins with the law, why they let the cameras in, making dynamite, and old proofing methods.
| 21 | Special | "Secret Summit Part 2" | February 13, 2013 | N/A |
In part 2 of this two-part special, the moonshiners meet in a secluded cabin for an interview with executive producer Matthew Ostrom. They talk about the moonshiners code, leading double lives, obsessive fans, and the perils of life at the still site.
| 22 | Special | "Tickle's Guide to Love" | February 14, 2013 | N/A |

=== Season 3 (2013–14) ===
| No. overall | No. in season | Title | Original release date | US viewers (millions) |
|---|---|---|---|---|
| 23 | Special | "The Road to the Shine: Outlaw Cuts" | October 29, 2013 | 1.25 |
The off season from moonshining provides the moonshiners some relief from the long hours of work and constant fear of getting caught. The moonshiners set aside their craft and carry on the other parts of their lives.: This special has also aired under the title "Road to the Shine".
| 24 | Special | "Kick-Off Summit" | November 5, 2013 | 1.91 |
The moonshiners gather in a secluded cabin to kick off the new season. The episode features new-season highlights and clues to what lies ahead. Josh and Bill go on an adventure to Kentucky, and fans get answers to their questions.
| 25 | 1 | "Time to 'Shine" | November 5, 2013 | 2.52 |
A the start of the moonshine season, moonshiners Jeff and Mark, and partners Josh and Bill get to work making moonshine. Meanwhile, veteran moonshiner Tim Smith will make a life-changing move, and Tickle is forced to realize that his time to shine has just begun.
| 26 | 2 | "A Shiner in Kentucky" | November 12, 2013 | 2.02 |
Mark and Jeff clear their remote North Carolina still site, while an argument between Josh and Bill threatens to destroy their partnership. Tim has a tough time adjusting to moonshining in a legal Kentucky distillery, and Tickle takes a road trip.
| 27 | 3 | "Swamp Shiners" | November 19, 2013 | 2.12 |
Mark and Jeff struggle to set up their remote still site, while Josh and Bill are desperate for cash to build a new copper still. Tensions run high in the Kentucky distillery with Tim and his partner Steve, and a new moonshiner appears in Mississippi.
| 28 | Special | "Secret Summit: State of the Shine" | November 26, 2013 | N/A |
| 29 | 4 | "More Shiners More Problems" | November 26, 2013 | 2.72 |
Tim Smith hires a person with a checkered past to help at the distillery in Kentucky. Tickle learns how to make moonshine in a copper pot still from a veteran moonshiner. In North Carolina, Jeff and Mark are surprised by an unexpected visitor.
| 30 | 5 | "Hush Money" | December 3, 2013 | 2.78 |
In North Carolina, Jeff and Mark must pay hush money to the property owner of their still site, while veteran moonshiner Jim Tom helps Wayne refine his moonshine recipe. In Virginia, Tickle encounters bad luck when he starts bootlegging his own moonshine.
| 31 | Special | "A Moonshiners Christmas" | December 10, 2013 | 2.08 |
The moonshiners share some of their holiday traditions with us. Tim celebrates with his firehouse family; Josh cuts the best tree for his daughter. Mark and Jeff share a holiday dinner; Bill makes handmade gifts, and Tickle offers some holiday tips.: This special also aired under the title "Christmas Special".
| 32 | 6 | "First Run" | December 10, 2013 | 2.47 |
Tickle bootlegs at night, while Wayne comes up with an ingenious drop-off plan for his own bootleggers. Equipment failure threatens the production of Tim Smith's legal moonshine, and Josh and Bill finally begin their first run of strawberry brandy.
| 33 | 7 | "Blue Moonshine" | December 17, 2013 | 2.22 |
Josh and Bill are forced back to their day jobs after their moonshine runs blue. Chico, under financial stress, makes a hard decision that could risk it all. Tickle struggles to keep Tim's old territory supplied. Mark and Jeff move their liquor.
| 34 | 8 | "Rival Shiners" | December 24, 2013 | 2.16 |
Tim reaches a milestone with his first bottled batch of moonshine. Jeff and Mark suspect a rival in their territory. Chico takes a risk that could cost him everything. Josh and Bill's only hope at financing their moonshine operation is to consider bootlegging.
| 35 | 9 | "Bootlegging Blowups" | December 31, 2013 | 2.45 |
Tim enlists Tickle's help to investigate his new still hand, Chico. Josh and Bill take on new risks as they try to stay alive in the moonshine game, as bootleggers. Jeff, Mark and Lance look to take out the competition.
| 36 | Special | "The Ballad of Jim Tom" | January 7, 2014 | 2.26 |
Jim Tom tells his story in song as he begins attempting to fulfill his lifelong dream of becoming a country music star.
| 37 | 10 | "Moonshine War" | January 7, 2014 | 3.02 |
Tickle goes undercover in Kentucky, to find out what Chico has been up to. Josh and Bill hit the open road, to bootleg moonshine at a music festival. But they soon hit a violent roadblock. Jeff, Mark and Lance look to take out the competition with one shot.
| 38 | Special | "Secret Summit: The Struggles" | January 14, 2014 | N/A |
| 39 | 11 | "Firewater" | January 14, 2014 | 2.65 |
Josh and Bill suffer the consequences of bootlegging. Darlene goes against her best instinct and lights up her still indoors. Jeff, Mark, and Lance find their competition is still out there. Tim takes final measures to protect his legal moonshine business.
| 40 | 12 | "Aftershock" | January 28, 2014 | 2.77 |
Jeff and Mark look to cash in on one final run of the season. Tickle and Chico's still site is compromised. Mike is desperate to complete his New Orleans order, and turns to Darlene. Josh and Bill might get to sell some of their own liquor after all.
| 41 | Special | "Secret Summit: Secrets of the Shine" | February 4, 2014 | N/A |
| 42 | 13 | "Liquid Courage" | February 4, 2014 | 3.03 |
Jeff and Mark reach the ultimate roadblock. Deputy Chuck is hot on a trail. Josh and Bill might finally be back in the game. Mike takes a trip to finish off his biggest sale of the season. Tickle and crew attract unwanted attention.

=== Season 4 (2014–15) ===
| No. overall | No. in season | Title | Original release date | US viewers (millions) |
|---|---|---|---|---|
| 43 | Special | "The Off Season" | October 28, 2014 | N/A |
| 44 | Special | "Secret Summit Kickoff" | November 4, 2014 | 1.402 |
Tim, Tickle, Josh, Bill, Jeff and Mark gather at a secret location to count down the minutes to the new season premiere. Jim Tom surprises producers by making his debut at the roundtable. Then the guys let Tim be the judge of a moonshine taste test.: This special also aired under the title "Kick-Off Summit".
| 45 | 1 | "Shine On" | November 4, 2014 | 1.77 |
Tim is on the run after his operation was set on fire. Jim Tom prepares for his second coming as a moonshiner. Tickle and Tyler take their partnership to a new level. Josh and Bill sell last year's surplus moonshine. Jeff and Mark survey an indoor still site.
| 46 | 2 | "Moonshine Waterfall" | November 11, 2014 | 1.80 |
Tickle and Tyler need to fix a bad feed line and get back to work at the moonshine cave. Jim Tom and Roy build the still that will carry them to greatness. Josh and Bill are sidelined with a crushed still. Sheriff's Deputy Chuck gains ground on Lance.
| 47 | 3 | "Bullet Proof" | November 18, 2014 | 1.88 |
Josh & Bill pick up the pieces of their broken still. Lance tries to brew a moonshine game changer as Sheriff's Deputy Chuck closes in. Tickle gets stranded miles from civilization. Tim sets out from Kentucky in search of greener pastures.
| 48 | Special | "Thanksgiving Summit" | November 25, 2014 | 0.946 |
The moonshiners gather at a secret location to discuss the season, Thanksgiving table etiquette, and how to bag a turkey Moonshiners-style, and share their favorite family recipes. Shiner Josh and sidekick Cutie Pie visit a legendary moonshiner.
| 49 | 4 | "Risky Whiskey" | November 25, 2014 | 1.61 |
Josh and Bill rebuild bigger and better. Lance takes a risk on a new kind of whiskey, while Jeff and Mark prep their indoor still site. Tickle and crew battle the elements in Kentucky. Tim gives the North Carolina distillery a backwoods makeover.
| 50 | 5 | "Tennessee Rising" | December 2, 2014 | 2.05 |
Two former still hands of moonshine legend Popcorn Sutton emerge from the shadows. Tim learns that getting out of the illegal liquor business doesn't get you out of the woods. And a ton of work lies ahead for Mark and Jeff after a brush with the law.
| 51 | Special | "Christmas Shine" | December 9, 2014 | 1.586 |
The Shiners share they Christmas recipes.: This special also aired under the title "A Moonshiner's Christmas"
| 52 | 6 | "Moonshine Takedown" | December 9, 2014 | 2.03 |
Tickle nails down a stash spot. Josh and Bill butt heads in the backwoods. Jim Tom and Roy are back in action. Mark and Digger's still goes from old school to state-of-the-art. And Mark and Jeff put the bells and whistles on their new shine spot.
| 53 | 7 | "White Lightning Wars" | December 16, 2014 | 1.74 |
Mark and Jeff feel the heat as the law closes in. Tim's plan to give a backwoods makeover to Troy's distillery will cost him big. The law cracks down on Josh and Bill. Tickle flirts with disaster as he tries to sell his Kentucky made white lightning.
| 54 | 8 | "Liquid Assets" | December 23, 2014 | 2.149 |
Tickle has his hands full keeping track of his liquor and Chico and Tyler are becoming suspicious. Bill and Josh build an underground bunker to hide their shine. Tennessee shiners, Mark and Digger, test an invention that could revolutionize moonshining.
| 55 | Special | "Jim Tom's Road to Nashville, Volume 1" | December 30, 2014 | 1.775 |
Jim Tom embarks on an adventure, ending up in Music City, U.S.A.
| 56 | 9 | "Shine Jacked" | December 30, 2014 | 2.49 |
Josh and Bill have a close call with authorities; a new lawman visits two shiners in Tennessee.
| 57 | Special | "Jim Tom's Road to Nashville, Volume 2" | January 6, 2015 | 1.414 |
| 58 | 10 | "Moonshine River" | January 6, 2015 | 2.06 |
Josh and Bill have a triple batch run; Tickle makes a sacrifice to save his partnership; Tim is ready to see if the Asheville distillery can produce his moonshine.
| 59 | Special | "Secret Summit: Outlaw Confessions" | January 13, 2015 | 1.069 |
| 60 | 11 | "Shine Overboard" | January 13, 2015 | 1.69 |
The final weeks of shine season are here. Josh & Bill's liquor gets stuck six feet under. Chico & Tyler brew a sweet & sticky moonshine game-changer. Tickle gets trumped by his old buddy. And Mark & Jeff's first sale on the water ends in disaster.
| 61 | 12 | "Bootleg or Bust" | January 20, 2015 | 2.07 |
Josh & Bill go into the water business to secretly sell their shine. Tim returns to Virginia to fill a huge last-minute order. Mark takes a second shot at delivering his liquor by boat. And Tickle's deal with a moonshine savior almost breaks down.
| 62 | Special | "One Shot" | January 27, 2015 | N/A |
Tim and Tickle sit back and comment while the first episode of Moonshiners is rerun.
| 63 | 13 | "Bros Before Hooch" | January 27, 2015 | 2.22 |
Tickle's loyalty is tested as he risks it all to stay true to his old partner, Tim. Josh and Bill decide to make one last run in the woods but soon discover that they're not alone. Mark and Digger's season is in danger after their bootleg deal backfires.
| 64 | Special | "Two Shots" | February 3, 2015 | N/A |
Tim and Tickle sit back and comment while the first episode of Moonshiners is rerun.
| 65 | 14 | "The Shining" | February 3, 2015 | 2.65 |
It's last call in shine country. Deputy Chuck takes to the water to catch Mark red-handed. Tim & Tickle work together to make a rush delivery of 2,000 cases of liquor in their home state. The cops close in on Josh & Bill with shocking consequences.
| 66 | Special | "Secret Summit: Final Countdown" | February 3, 2015 | N/A |
The moonshiners gather to discuss their most dangerous season yet. Chico and Tyler talk about their split with Tickle.

=== Season 5 (2015–16) ===
| No. overall | No. in season | Title | Original release date | US viewers (millions) |
|---|---|---|---|---|
| 67 | 1 | "American Spirits" | November 17, 2015 | 1.76 |
Moonshine season is in session. Shine is in demand and the law is on the hunt. Tim faces a dilemma that jeopardizes his legal business. Jeff, Mark and Lance aim to double their profits while the law threatens to end Josh and Bill's season early.
| 68 | 2 | "Whiskey Burn" | November 24, 2015 | 1.58 |
It's the first weeks of shine season and outlaws are eager to turn a profit before the cops close in. Josh & Bill's first run leaves a bitter taste. Jeff, Mark, & Lance scope out the competition as Mark & Digger come up with a revolutionary still design.
| 69 | 3 | "Gone A-Rye" | December 1, 2015 | 1.65 |
Shiners attempt to stay off the grid as the outside world encroaches on the backwoods. Tim breaks the news about the fate of Climax Moonshine. Jeff, Mark and Lance search for a new site before rivals can grab hold of the market.
| 70 | 4 | "Still Life" | December 8, 2015 | 2.12 |
Shine season is in full swing as Josh & Bill find themselves with no still, no home base and no shine. Mark & Digger enlist a whiskey legend to find out why their first run went awry. Mark, Jeff & Lance undertake construction on an ambitious still site.
| 71 | 5 | "Rain or Shine" | December 15, 2015 | 1.57 |
Weeks into moonshine season, Josh & Bill race to finish their still site and make their first run. Intruders interrupt Mark & Digger's rye test. A deadly disaster leaves Tim rattled and rethinking his plans to expand.
| 72 | 6 | "A Very Moonshiners Christmas" | December 22, 2015 | 1.98 |
It's Christmas in Appalachia! And whether it's gathering with friends and loved ones, giving yuletide alms, creating new flavors of shine or forging new traditions, these shiners are embracing the holiday spirit.
| 73 | 7 | "Scotch on the Rocks" | December 29, 2015 | 1.7 |
It's one step forward and two steps back for Josh and Bill as they near the completion of their bunker. Meanwhile, Jeff, Mark and Lance are $6000 in the hole after losing a batch of mash before starting work on their Highland Scotch.
| 74 | 8 | "Six Feet Undercover" | January 5, 2016 | 1.92 |
Mark and Digger, with help from Jim Tom, craft 150 gallons of brandy using their revolutionary still pot design. Now, it's just a matter of getting their shine into the hands of their eager customers.
| 75 | 9 | "Out On A Limb" | January 12, 2016 | 2.04 |
In North Carolina a behemoth threatens to undo months of construction for Josh and Bill. A nocturnal prowler threatens Patti and David's clandestine operation and battle lines are drawn in Kentucky as Chico and Tyler clash over creative differences.
| 76 | 10 | "Trouble Brewing" | January 19, 2016 | 1.80 |
With summer winding down, shiners are doubling their efforts to turn a quick profit. Tim Smith traverses the Atlantic, to Poland, on his quest to dominate the international shine market, but his pitch could be lost in translation.
| 77 | 11 | "Caved In" | January 26, 2016 | 2.04 |
After coming to blow with Bill, Josh fears he may have finally gone too far. Patti and David aim to make up for lost time with a scorching new brew but alarm bells have them running for the hills.
| 78 | 12 | "Cherry Bounce" | February 2, 2016 | 1.99 |
It's the final weeks of summer and shiners are putting it all on the line. Tim must create a way to fill a massive international order and it's judgment day in Virginia as Tickle puts on a brave face for court.
| 79 | 13 | "Shine 'Til You Drop" | February 9, 2016 | 2.08 |
The stakes get higher as shine season nears its end. Mark and Digger leave disaster behind for a new still site as Patti and David's jalapeno whiskey drives them to sell in unfamiliar territory.
| 80 | 14 | "Still Regretting" | February 16, 2016 | 2.08 |
Josh is down his right hand and his right hand man. Snags at the distillery have production at a halt and Tim's future in jeopardy. Chico and Sandra set out on horseback for some mountain shining. Patti and David rush to run before hunting season begins.
| 81 | 15 | "Virgin Whiskey" | February 23, 2016 | 1.76 |
Chico & Sandra are anxious to get back in the saddle and make their first run. Tim's behemoth tank might not be the ticket to fulfilling the Poland order after all . With Jim Tom by his side, Josh churns out a family heritage spirit.
| 82 | 16 | "Presidential Shine" | March 1, 2016 | 1.59 |
Patti and David rush to sell off their stash before a local fracking operation ends their season in a bust. Jeff, Mark and Lance hope that a classic recipe will save their season. A calling card from the law may bring Mark & Digger's season to an end.
| 83 | 17 | "End of an Era" | March 8, 2016 | 1.85 |
It's last call in shine country. Tim is thousands of cases of moonshine away from delivering the order of a lifetime. Mark & Digger receive the surprise of their lives in the middle of a shine sale. Josh is working on one last score and making amends.
| 84 | Special | "Need for Speed" | March 15, 2016 | N/A |
Josh aims to take his dirt track skills to the next level with the help of a speedway pro. Tyler searches for the perfect bootlegging car. Mark & Huck take their haul off-road to deliver across state lines. Mark & Digger aim to revive a heritage car.

=== Season 6 (2016–17) ===
Season six started on November 15, 2016.

| No. overall | No. in season | Title | Original release date | US viewers (millions) |
|---|---|---|---|---|
| 85 | Special | "Moonshiners on Moonshiners" | November 15, 2016 | N/A |
Before season six of Moonshiners begins, the cast is reminiscing about classic moments of seasons past. The shiners are taking a look back at some of the most memorable moments in moonshiner's history.: This special has also aired under the title "Moonshiners on Moonshining".
| 86 | 1 | "Whiskey Rebellion" | November 15, 2016 | 1.579 |
Josh has made a strong start, but working solo can lead to catastrophic results. Former outlaw Tim Smith is training his son JT to help run his legal outfit.
| 87 | 2 | "Take Me To The River" | November 22, 2016 | 1.511 |
Patti & David scramble to locate a clean water source for their operation. Mark Rogers ventures into unfamiliar territory to secure new buyers. Mark & Digger use an old moonshiner's trick to spook intruders from their still site.
| 88 | 3 | "Hard Start" | November 29, 2016 | N/A |
A catastrophe leaves Josh desperately in need of a helping hand; Chico and Sandra's moonshine partnership puts strain on their relationship; Mark and Digger furnish their still with an innovation, but their operation has attracted an unwanted visitor.
| 89 | 4 | "Luck of the Irish" | December 6, 2016 | N/A |
A rookie mistake could leave Josh and Chuck's operation dead in the water; Tim Smith travels across the Atlantic to teach an old Irish distillery about making moonshine; Mark and Digger's mash test is interrupted by an unwanted visitor.
| 90 | 5 | "Big River Redemption" | December 13, 2016 | N/A |
Mark and Digger struggle to get a special recipe run for a shine legend; Big Chuck attempts to redeem himself after destroying Josh's operation; Chico and Sandra continue work on their still site but disaster strikes.
| 91 | 6 | "Making Spirits Bright" | December 20, 2016 | N/A |
Mark and Digger dress up as Santa Claus for kids in need. Later, Patti and David prepare food for a holiday feast; and Bill gets ready to go Christmas caroling in true Carolina fashion.
| 92 | 7 | "Whiskey Time Machine" | December 27, 2016 | N/A |
Tim needs to rescue his operation, with challenges from nature and time; Mark and Digger implement a high-tech addition to their operation that could double their output; Jeff and Lance make absinthe, a once-banned liquor.
| 93 | 8 | "Dog Days of Shining" | January 3, 2017 | N/A |
Josh and Big Chuck attempt to revive their season with a new still site; Mark and Digger prepare to put their still design to the test; Mark and Mike take their first steps to grab at a new territory.
| 94 | 9 | "Smokey Mountain Gin" | January 10, 2017 | N/A |
Tim Smith puts a whiskey time machine to the test; and Chico and Sandra try a new recipe to revive their stalled season. Later, Mark and Digger experiment with distilling a classic on their high-speed rig.
| 95 | 10 | "Green Dragon" | January 17, 2017 | N/A |
Josh and Chuck aim to get back on top; money threatens to destroy an age-old partnership for Jeff, Mark and Lance; Mark and Digger painstakingly craft a special brew for a high rolling customer.
| 96 | 11 | "Big City Bootleg" | January 24, 2017 | N/A |
Josh and Big Chuck go underground to build a new stash site; Mark and Digger venture out of the Smokeys and into the big city for the biggest sale of their careers; Patti and David follow nature's harvest to make a sweet new brew.
| 97 | 12 | "Big Wheels Keep On Turning" | January 31, 2017 | N/A |
Mark and Digger bring in a moonshine legend to rev up production. Josh and Chuck turn to an old power source to prolong their operation. Chico and Sondra gear up for their first big sale of the season. Tim puts dollars on the line to save his operation.
| 98 | 13 | "The Green Devil" | February 7, 2017 | N/A |
Jeff and Lance attempt to salvage their absinthe recipe; Mark puts his new partner to the test; rough labor and lack of profit threaten to leave Josh up the creek without a paddle or a partner; and Patti and David are without their key ingredient.
| 99 | 14 | "Thunder Pumpkins" | February 14, 2017 | N/A |
An ingredient has Josh and Chuck ready to quit the biz; Mark and Digger band together with JB to run their signature spirit; Tim puts his turbo-aged whiskey to the test; and Chico and Sondra have their sights on a new brew.
| 100 | 15 | "Two Pot Bang Bang" | February 21, 2017 | 1.60 |
Josh and Chuck struggle to finish winterizing their site; Mark and Digger bring their two-pot still out of retirement; and Mark and Mike have enjoyed a string of successful runs, but delivering the moonshine could get them arrested.
| 101 | 16 | "Intruder Alert" | March 7, 2017 | 1.74 |
Winter closes in and shiners aim to finish their seasons strong. Mark and Digger clash with the law. A breach from an intruder leaves Josh and Chuck deep in debt. Chico and Sondra's operation is burned.
| 102 | 17 | "Last Call" | March 14, 2017 | 1.55 |
Winter hot on their heels, shiners aim to cash in. A partnership comes to a bittersweet end as Jeff, Mark and Lance head their separate ways. Tim gets to spend time with and old friend. Patti and David end their season with a boatload of shine.
| 103 | Special | "The Legend of Tim Smith" | March 14, 2017 | N/A |
Tim Smith, who delivered his father's illegal shine recipe from the backwoods of Virginia to America's store shelves, takes us back in time to his humble beginnings. Accompanying him to locations of his memories, we glance into his life as a moonshiner.
| 104 | Special | "Mark Rogers: Last of the Mountain Men" | March 21, 2017 | N/A |
Mark Rogers has lived off the land, surviving in today's world by hunting, fishing and making liquor. Mark heads into the mountains of Appalachia to track a black bear and also to dig ginseng, a rare medicinal root that he wants to infuse with moonshine.
| 105 | Special | "The Tale of Tickle" | March 28, 2017 | N/A |
Pittsylvania County's most wanted, Steven Ray Tickle, takes a trip down memory lane remembering the people and events that shaped his life and led him to become the model backwoods shiner and outlaw he is today.
| 106 | Special | "The Fast and the Fearless" | March 28, 2017 | N/A |
While tinkering on a 1950 Packard, Mark and Digger reminisce about the automobile's effect on the moonshining business. Their conversation is a walk down Moonshiners memory lane as we revisit some of the series' greatest hits related to the automobile.

=== Season 7 (2017–18) ===
| No. overall | No. in season | Title | Original release date | US viewers (millions) |
|---|---|---|---|---|
| 107 | Special | "The Codes of the Craft" | November 7, 2017 | 1.55 |
Six guiding principles for moonshining are presented and asserted to be essential.
| 108 | 1 | "Snake Bitten" | November 14, 2017 | 1.45 |
In the Season 7 premiere, moonshine season is back and demand is higher than ever. Tim Smith is visited by a former agent from his outlaw past; Mark and Digger get a sign from above in Tennessee; and Josh's dog has an encounter with a snake.
| 109 | 2 | "Shine in the Sky" | November 21, 2017 | 1.25 |
Moonshine season is underway and the moonshiners are eager to get product to market; Josh gets a mash ready while awaiting Cutie Pie's fate; Mark and Digger struggle with materials while building an experimental three-pot still.
| 110 | 3 | "Lightning Strikes" | November 28, 2017 | 1.50 |
The moonshiners encounter some setbacks; Josh hopes to take on a partner, while Mark and Digger erect the cornerstone of their massive three-pot still; Patti and David hunt for clean swamp water; and Mike works to fulfill an order.
| 111 | 4 | "Pony Express" | December 5, 2017 | 1.55 |
In Tennessee, Mark and Digger are ready to test out their three-pot still. Chico and Sondra employ a pony. Later, Josh rides under the radar in South Carolina.
| 112 | Special | "High Proof Holidays" | December 6, 2017 | N/A |
Tim and JT team up with Tickle's mother and daughter to create a Christmas surprise, while Chico and Sondra head out to shoot the Christmas turkey.: This special also aired under the title "Moonshiners xXxmas"
| 113 | 5 | "Second Chances" | December 12, 2017 | 1.54 |
Mark and Digger seek redemption on their 3-pot still. Tim enlists Tickle as JT's moonshine mentor. Patti and David build a second still in hopes of doubling their production, and Lance tries to regain Jeff's trust running solo.
| 114 | 6 | "Legends of the Shine" | December 19, 2017 | 1.37 |
Mark and Digger test yeast strains on a new moonshine recipe. Tim and JT visit moonshine legends. Mark Rodgers sets up a new still site without a partner. Sondra and Chico start their season with a run of strawberry banana brandy.
| 115 | Special | "Shiners on Shine – Bootlegging Liquor" | December 20, 2017 | 1.28 |
Moonshiners Tim, Tickle & Mark & Digger discuss bootlegging; a tradition as old as moonshining itself. They reminisce about their biggest hauls, closest brushes with the law, and favorite tactics of evasion.: This special also aired under the title "Shiners on Shine – Bootlegging"
| 116 | 7 | "Pass the Juice" | December 26, 2017 | 1.53 |
In North Carolina, Mike brings back an old family moonshine recipe. Meanwhile, Mark and Digger troubleshoot a stalled fermentation problem.
| 117 | Special | "Shiners on Shine: Close Calls" | January 3, 2018 | 1.15 |
Tim, Tickle, Mark and Digger look back on their closest calls with the harsh wilderness and law enforcement in their moonshining efforts.
| 118 | 8 | "Stash and Grab" | January 3, 2018 | 1.46 |
Mark and Digger recruit a retired moonshiner; Josh and Chuck run an old family recipe; Lance enlists the help of a bootlegger to move his product; Sondra has to think fast.
| 119 | Special | "Shiners on Shine: Fails" | January 9, 2018 | 825 |
Tim, Tickle, Mark and Digger relive their greatest muck ups from rookie mistakes to season sinking disasters – every shiner has a memorable moment they just want to forget.
| 120 | 9 | "Arrested Development" | January 9, 2018 | 1.34 |
Tickle mentors JT at Belmont Farm; Mark and Digger receive an impossible shine order; Patti and David secure their still site after spotting a deadly intruder; Lance and Jeff scramble when their bootlegger goes missing.
| 121 | Special | "Shiners on Shine: Innovate or Die" | January 16, 2018 | 962 |
Moonshiners, Tim, Tickle, Mark and Digger review their efforts at backwoods engineering and the innovations that have furthered the craft while keeping their operations clandestine and productive.
| 122 | 10 | "Skins in the Game" | January 16, 2018 | 1.41 |
Tim tries an old method for finding water. Mark and Digger source ingredients for a unique liquor. Mark and Mike reunite, while Chico and Sondra risk it all.
| 123 | Special | "Shiners on Shine: It Ain't Easy To Shine" | January 23, 2018 | 975 |
Tim, Tickle, Mark and Digger discuss the challenges of moonshining.
| 124 | 11 | "Curse of the Blown Cover" | January 23, 2018 | 1.40 |
In the Great Smoky Mountains, Mark and Digger prepare for their first run of "hillbilly grappa". In Louisiana, Patti and David bootleg on the bayou. At Belmont Farms, an experimental moonshine is prepared while Mike seeks out a new still hand in Tennessee.
| 125 | Special | "Shiners on Shine: Friends and Foes" | January 30, 2018 | 891 |
Moonshiners Tim, Tickle, Mark and Digger review the friendships, families and rivalries in the history of moonshining.
| 126 | 12 | "Highway to Hell" | February 6, 2018 | 1.25 |
Josh embarks on a harrowing cross-country delivery. Rain threatens the final run of a special seasonal shine recipe. A "Shiner in Chief" inspires a top-dollar batch of malted rye whiskey.
| 127 | Special | "Shiners on Shine: Moonshiner Heritage" | February 6, 2018 | 799 |
Moonshiners Tim, Tickle, Mark and Digger discuss moonshine traditions.
| 128 | 13 | "From the Flames" | February 13, 2018 | 1.21 |
Josh must make good with a biker gang after a trailer fire leaves them empty handed. Tickle's first run of legal rye whiskey tempts him to return to the illegal side. In Louisiana, a sassafras shine experiment puts a big delivery at risk.
| 129 | 14 | "High and Dry" | February 21, 2018 | 1.22 |
Approaching a large season sale, Josh works on moonshine making methods. Mark and Digger scramble to complete a technically challenging run while Mark risks a solo run of sour mash whiskey. Patti and David hit the Gulf of Mexico for their biggest sale yet.
| 130 | Special | "Mark and Digger: Legends and Legacy" | March 6, 2018 | 969 |
Mark and Digger describe the early days of their partnership, what they learned from old-timer Popcorn Sutton, and their tinkering with still designs and recipes.
| 131 | 15 | "Lighted Up" | March 6, 2018 | 1.22 |
Mark and Digger confront a moonshiner who's been edging into their territory; Josh makes a split-second decision as red and blue lights flash; Lance hopes a big sale could rectify past bootlegging blunders; and Mike risks his sale, reputation and freedom.
| 132 | Special | "Whiskey Business" | March 13, 2018 | 1.02 |
Each year, dozens of U.S. craft distilleries fail and Tim Smith thinks he knows why. In this episode, Tim and his team of experts help struggling owners of Missouri Ridge Distillery to "put the woods back in the whiskey", in hopes of helping the producer turn a profit
| 133 | 16 | "Not a Crook" | March 13, 2018 | 1.15 |
With added facts and extra scenes. Tim considers a permanent role for Tickle at the distillery; Sondra convinces Chico that a unique recipe will seal their season; Lance surprises Jeff with an unorthodox moonshine ingredient.
| 134 | Special | "Mark Rogers: The Will to Survive" | March 20, 2018 | 1.22 |
Mark Rogers, an Appalachian moonshiner, goes into the woods to make moonshine and help his cousin Chuck learn the trade.
| 135 | 17 | "Foraging for a Long Winter Ahead" | March 20, 2018 | 1.40 |
In Tennessee, Mike sets himself up for a career high with a run of specialty liquor but faces a devastating setback. In the last run of the season, Sondra takes charge, and Rodgers tampers with his final run in an attempt to cash out.
| 136 | 18 | "Last Nail in the Coffin" | March 27, 2018 | 1.42 |
Cops stop Mark and Digger during their last big bootleg. Josh risks a $20K sale with an unreliable biker gang, and Mike provokes a turf war.

=== Season 8 (2018–19) ===
| No. overall | No. in season | Title | Original release date | US viewers (millions) |
|---|---|---|---|---|
| 137 | 1 | "High Proof Holidays" | December 11, 2018 | 0.92 |
It's Christmas in Appalachia and Tim Smith is 4000 miles away in Alaska making a special delivery to his northernmost customer. In Tennessee, Mark and Digger cook up a plan to make a holiday run of liquor for two legendary shiners from a bygone era.
| 138 | Special | "Secret Summit Season Kickoff" | January 2, 2019 | 1.37 |
America's top 'shiners gather at an undisclosed location to discuss unsettled business for Moonshiners' new season. They reveal backwoods secrets that keep them ahead of the law, and put their skills to the test in a first-ever moonshiner showdown.: This special also aired under the title "Secret Summit Season Kickoff".
| 139 | 2 | "Legacy on the Line" | January 2, 2019 | 1.54 |
A wipeout at 100 miles per hour (160 km/h) puts Josh's operation in jeopardy, Tim takes a risk on rye, and Mark and Digger are hellbent on backwoods justice after Mike's betrayal.
| 140 | 3 | "Backwoods Justice" | January 9, 2019 | 1.40 |
Tensions rise in Tennessee as Mike must answer for destroying Mark and Digger's still. With Tickle in jail, JT helps two outlaw shiners who show up looking for help in the woods. Josh faces more bad news in the form of a bear.
| 141 | Special | "The Secret Engineering of Moonshiners" | January 16, 2019 | 0.96 |
From devising elaborate stills to make high proof liquor, to constructing insane bootleg contraptions to sell it, backwoods ingenuity drives moonshiners to invent new solutions to the centuries-old problem of avoiding the law.: This special also aired under the title "Secrets of Backwoods Engineering".
| 142 | 4 | "Wrong Side of the Law" | January 16, 2019 | 1.30 |
Tim finds himself on the wrong side of the law after JT sees an agent near a still site. Mike designs a unique still to make high-dollar shine. Mark and Digger make a run into town, and Josh discovers what bears do in the woods.
| 143 | Special | "The Legend of Jim Tom" | January 23, 2019 | 1.06 |
Across Appalachia, the name Jim Tom has meant moonshine. Between run-ins with the law and time serving hard labor, he spent 60 years making illegal shine. A mentor to Josh, Mark and Digger, his secrets define the next generation of outlaw shiners.: This special combines footage from former Jim Tom specials along with newly filmed footage.
| 144 | 5 | "Popcorn's Secret Stash" | January 23, 2019 | 1.30 |
Popcorn Sutton's widow reveals a clue that may lead Mark and Digger to a hidden stash a decade after his death; Mike brews brandy to pay off his debt to Digger and Mark; Donnie and Teresa fabricate a secret still site in a Kentucky cave.
| 145 | 6 | "Burden of Proof" | January 30, 2019 | 1.51 |
Booted off his backwoods still site, Josh turns to his stock-car racing roots to invent a whole new way of making moonshine. JB comes to the rescue as Mark and Digger fall short on a run. Mark Rogers faces a close encounter with the law.
| 146 | 7 | "Breaking the Laws" | February 6, 2019 | 1.28 |
When their still site gets compromised, Henry and Kenny enlist the help of bootlegging legend Amos Law. To pay off his debt to Mark and Digger, Mike runs his still to the breaking point. Tim doubles down on JT and Tickle's double rye.
| 147 | 8 | "Mid-Season Secret Summit" | February 13, 2019 | 0.865 |
The shiners gather to deal with unfinished business. Mike tells his side of the Mark and Digger feud. Josh reveals scars from his checkered past, and the shiners put their skills to the test in a whiskey showdown.
| 148 | 9 | "Moonshiner's Apprentice" | February 13, 2019 | 1.16 |
Mark and Digger's new apprentice proves talent cannot be taught. Josh tempts fate converting a new race car trailer into a mobile moonshining masterpiece. Mark enlists a retired lawman to bootleg 30 gallons of shine into a music festival.
| 149 | 10 | "Hillbilly Ingenuity" | February 20, 2019 | 1.28 |
As Josh gets set to fire up his hidden mobile still at a biker rally, law enforcement gets wise to his illicit plan. Mark and Digger's backwoods potato vodka hits a sweet spot. Short on payback cash, Mike and Daniel invent a new way to get out of debt.
| 150 | Special | "Secret Backwoods Recipes" | February 20, 2019 | 0.951 |
Across centuries of tradition, only a handful of moonshine recipes are considered among the best. In the right hands, local ingredients and backwoods ingenuity create magic in a mason jar. But the path to perfection is always paved with spills.: This special also aired under the title "Secret Recipes".
| 151 | 11 | "Bootlegger's Bounty" | February 27, 2019 | N/A |
Tracking down an old-time bootlegger, Mark and Digger uncover treasures Popcorn Sutton left behind. In debt, Mike and Daniel engineer a split pot still to upgrade their shine, and its price. Patti and David convert pontoons into a bayou still site.
| 152 | 12 | "Full Throttle Throwdown" | February 27, 2019 | N/A |
Fast cars collide with backwoods tradition as Moonshiner Josh Owens puts pedal to the metal on the Carolina Dragway. Gasser rules mean vintage cars and parts only, but in skilled hands heritage pays off in horsepower. These gearheads race for glory.
| 153 | 13 | "Mobile Moonshine Madness" | March 6, 2019 | N/A |
Josh debuts his mobile still at a North Carolina biker rally. In the Great Smoky Mountains, Mike gets burned by a taste of his own medicine. There's a reason Franklin County, VA is the Moonshine Capital of America, and someone there is above the law.
| 154 | 14 | "Hundred Proof Heritage" | March 6, 2019 | N/A |
Mark and Digger's first run of barrel-aged bourbon gets interrupted by a bear. Scaling up Tickle's double rye tests Tim's backwoods engineering. Mark Rogers builds a malt house to make corn whiskey. In Kentucky, Donnie and Theresa come up short.
| 155 | 15 | "The Legend of Popcorn Sutton" | March 6, 2019 | N/A |
When Mark and Digger find a decade-old jar of Popcorn Sutton's shine, they vow to recreate their mentor's infamous last run. With help from old-timer JB Rader, they rebuild Popcorn's pot still and recount the antics of Appalachia's legendary outlaw.
| 156 | 16 | "Secret Summit: Unfinished Business" | March 13, 2019 | N/A |
Moonshiners share their tricks for running shine and how they avoid the long arm of the law. Tim reveals a visit with Tickle behind bars, and Mark & Digger reveal an unexpected twist in their search for Popcorn Sutton's shine, stashed a decade ago.
| 157 | 17 | "Whiskey Deception" | March 13, 2019 | N/A |
When a dead drop goes sideways, Mark Rogers deploys backwoods justice to straighten out a thief. Kelly's massive sorghum haul puts Mark and Digger's pot stills to the test. Mike & Daniel's clear apple pie has buyers calling from across county lines.
| 158 | 18 | "Free Tickle" | March 20, 2019 | N/A |
After a year behind bars, Tickle is transferred to Culpeper County, and Tim concocts a plan to get him out. In North Carolina, Mark Roger runs huckleberry shine to sweeten a backwoods deal, and Red Fox's crew work their tails off making peach brandy.
| 159 | 19 | "Breaking the Code" | March 20, 2019 | N/A |
Mark and Digger's handmade vodka is on a hot streak until a cold snap threatens their run. For Mark Rogers, breaking the moonshiner code can come at a steep price. Tim Smith risks a big run of Tickle's double rye to put the woods back into his shine.
| 160 | 20 | "Hillbilly Hack" | March 27, 2019 | N/A |
Mark & Digger build a hillbilly hack to save their handmade vodka. Pam may know more than she thinks about Popcorn's lost shine. Nothing but trouble for Josh running a still outside of the woods. Patti and David risk a seaplane bootleg on the bayou.
| 161 | 21 | "Risky Whiskey" | March 27, 2019 | N/A |
Tickle gets out of jail and Tim must keep him busy, but Tickle has ideas of his own. Mark and Digger make a discovery at Popcorn's boyhood home. On a midnight bootleg, Mark Rogers finds having the law on your side doesn't make you less of an outlaw.
| 162 | 22 | "The Trouble with Tickle" | April 3, 2019 | N/A |
Tickle returns to Tim's legal distillery and discovers he's traded one prison for another. Mark and Digger unearth a trove of Popcorn's shine. Josh finds an untapped market at a biker rally, but learns the cost of entry is more than the ticket price.
| 163 | 23 | "Tickle Unshackled" | April 3, 2019 | N/A |
Tickle's back and funnier than ever after a year in jail. Josh, in stitches, reveals an unexpected twist to his season. Mark and Digger uncover how Popcorn's shine-hoarding ways will pay off for Pam, and Tim gets a rematch on a proofing challenge.
| 164 | 24 | "Master Distiller" | July 9, 2019 | N/A |
A subculture of distillers across America carries on the backwoods tradition of moonshining. Now, judged by legends Mark, Digger and Tim, America's top legal and outlaw shiners go head to head to see who has what it takes to be called Master Distiller.

=== Season 9 (2019–20) ===
| No. overall | No. in season | Title | Original release date | US viewers (millions) |
|---|---|---|---|---|
| 165 | Special | "Tickle Runs For His Life" | November 19, 2019 | N/A |
Moonshine's prodigal son, Tickle, returns from jail to the Appalachian backwoods. With longtime partner, Tim, determined to stay legal, Tickle recruits an old friend to make an inaugural run of shine and re-stake his claim as an outlaw shiner.
| 166 | 1 | "Back to the Woods" | November 19, 2019 | N/A |
When Tickle returns to the outlaw side, even Tim can't resist the call of the backwoods. Mark and Digger rediscover a lost recipe from a legend. Mike finds the ultimate secret mountain still site, if only he can build a way to access it.
| 167 | Special | "Outracing The Law" | November 26, 2019 | N/A |
With a secret family recipe and a rich legacy in Carolina moonshine, Josh Owens races headlong into a new season. What's a few broken bones when you're building underground stills and selling shine at $200 a gallon, just one step ahead of the law?: This special also aired under the title "The Legend of Josh".
| 168 | 2 | "Proof Is the Payoff" | November 26, 2019 | N/A |
Tim and Tickle return to the scene of past crimes and rediscover their passion for outlaw moonshining. Mark Rogers designs a custom pot still to double distill shine he can sell for twice the price. Mark and Digger hand-build a copper mailbox still.
| 169 | 3 | "Tickle's Big Run" | December 3, 2019 | N/A |
Tickle mashes in his first large scale run of outlaw shine in years. Mark and Digger scramble to save their Popcorn legacy mash from runaway livestock. Mike ditches Daniel for a new full-time partner. Mark and Huck double their proof and their price.
| 170 | 4 | "Enemy at the Gate" | December 10, 2019 | N/A |
Teaming up with a former competitor, Mark and Digger sell their legacy shine in a neighboring county. Mike and Jerry double their shine output only to find customers are getting their shine from another source. Mountain man Mark tracks an intruder.
| 171 | 5 | "Wedding Cake Shine" | December 17, 2019 | N/A |
Mark and Digger attempt to rescue a former apprentice from a moonshine calamity. An unknown competitor invades Mike's turf, forcing him to change his shine strategy. Mark and Huck bank on backwoods survival skills to fuel their high-proof run.
| 172 | 6 | "Drone Vs. Shotgun" | December 31, 2019 | N/A |
Josh breaks into his secret stash to build a new still site, and breaks out his shotgun when a drone invades his airspace. Daniel hits the jackpot selling for Mark & Digger, while Mike finds his steady customers mysteriously less thirsty than usual.
| 173 | 7 | "Busted by the Law" | January 7, 2020 | N/A |
Tim devises a plan to make backwoods shine with Tickle for the first time in years. Short on patience and a key ingredient, Mark and Digger's bootleg operation comes under threat. In a series first, two Tennessee shiners get busted by cops on camera.
| 174 | 8 | "Toxic Work Environment" | January 14, 2020 | N/A |
Tickle's carpentry skills shine as Virginia outlaws plan a risky mod to their still. Mark and Digger take a big swing on a small ingredient that can't pass the sniff test. Josh digs deep and uncovers the worst way to foster a toxic work environment.
| 175 | 9 | "Tickle to the Rescue" | January 21, 2020 | N/A |
Tickle answers the call when Josh needs help salvaging an abandoned submarine still and his season. Mark and Digger take on a specialty bourbon made from Indian corn. Facing jail time, Van and Ewok gamble their freedom for another run.
| 176 | 10 | "Run for the Hills" | January 28, 2020 | N/A |
Mark and Digger attempt to rescue a former apprentice from a moonshine calamity. An unknown competitor invades Mike's turf, forcing him to change his shine strategy. Mark and Huck bank on backwoods survival skills to fuel their high-proof run.
| 177 | 11 | "Say Yes to the Mess" | February 4, 2020 | N/A |
Tickle announces his engagement and Tim discovers why his best friend can't quit the outlaw side. Unable to sell any shine, Mike attempts a long-distance bootleg that puts him in the crosshairs of the law. Josh bets that Sin City needs one more vice.
| 178 | 12 | "Murphy's Law for Outlaws" | February 11, 2020 | N/A |
Tickle and Tim put fire to their first backwoods run in a decade. With 250 gallons of mash on the brink of expiring, Mark and Digger torpedo their own operation. A minor oversight for Josh triggers a domino effect that threatens his entire site.
| 179 | 13 | "Rolling Down the Mountain" | February 18, 2020 | N/A |
A young outlaw with an old pot still earns an apprenticeship with Mark and Digger. Mountain man Mark tackles a week-long run to hit an $18K order that includes special delivery. In a desperate attempt to fix his worm barrel, Josh dives in headfirst.
| 180 | 14 | "Hemp Shine" | February 25, 2020 | N/A |
Tickle and the Laws infuse anxiety-reducing CBD into their shine but the science is anything but stress-free. Josh digs into his secret stash to cure his subterranean blues. A mystery bootlegger dominates Mike's turf and it's about to get incendiary.
| 181 | 15 | "Georgia On My Shine" | March 3, 2020 | N/A |
Mark and Digger head down to Georgia and uncover "Elvis," Popcorn Sutton's most prolific still. Mike plots payback after discovering a rival's liquor stealing his customers. Tim and Tickle are torn over what to do with their new backwoods shine.
| 182 | 16 | "Unexpected Offer" | March 10, 2020 | N/A |
Mike and Jerry confront Daniel about how their rival's liquor is invading their territory. Tickle, Henry and Kenny scale up their CBD-infused moonshine operation. A new bootlegger makes Mark and Digger an offer they can't refuse.
| 183 | 17 | "The Marvelous Mr. Tickle" | March 17, 2020 | N/A |
Tickle gets a life sentence and Appalachia turns out for his first walk down the aisle. Mark and Digger risk delivering strong shine and sweet justice. Josh smashes obstacles that stood in his way all season. Mike gets a taste of his own medicine.
| 184 | Special | "Super Summit" | March 24, 2020 | N/A |
The backwoods moonshiners meet up to discuss unfinished business.
| 185 | Special | "Super Brandy" | March 31, 2020 | N/A |
| 186 | Special | "Quaranshine" | May 9, 2020 | N/A |
Moonshiner Steven Tickle hosts as Mark, Digger, Tim, Josh and Mike share their quarantine secrets, make hand sanitizer from backwoods alcohol, and one-up each on how they're shining their way through the pandemic lockdown.

=== Season 10 (2020–21) ===
| No. overall | No. in season | Title | Original release date | US viewers (millions) |
|---|---|---|---|---|
| 187 | Special | "Mr. and Mrs. Tickle's Big Run" | November 17, 2020 | N/A |
| 188 | 1 | "Hard Time Make the Best Shine" | November 24, 2020 | N/A |
| 189 | 2 | "Interstate Alliance" | December 1, 2020 | N/A |
| 190 | Special | "Yuletide Shine" | December 1, 2020 | N/A |
| 191 | 3 | "Mark & Digger's Big Test" | December 8, 2020 | N/A |
| 192 | Special | "Outlaw Holidays" | December 8, 2020 | N/A |
| 193 | 4 | "Backwoods is Booming" | December 15, 2020 | N/A |
| 194 | Special | "Shiner Holiday Traditions" | December 15, 2020 | N/A |
| 195 | 5 | "No Ordinary Run" | December 22, 2020 | N/A |
| 196 | Special | "Holiday Showdown" | December 22, 2020 | N/A |
| 197 | Special | "Christmas With the Moonshiners" | December 15, 2020 | N/A |
| 198 | 6 | "Single Malt Moonshine" | December 29, 2020 | N/A |
| 199 | 7 | "Overproof and Under the Gun" | January 5, 2021 | N/A |
| 200 | 8 | "Too Much of a Good Thing" | January 12, 2021 | N/A |
| 201 | 9 | "Sweet Corn Revenge" | January 19, 2021 | N/A |
| 202 | 10 | "Smoke to the Fire" | January 26, 2021 | N/A |
| 203 | 11 | "Mason Jar Shortage" | February 2, 2021 | N/A |
| 204 | 12 | "Caught Red-Handed" | February 9, 2021 | N/A |
| 205 | 13 | "Hog Heaven" | February 16, 2021 | N/A |
| 206 | 14 | "Ice Shine" | February 23, 2021 | N/A |
| 207 | 15 | "Another Man's Mash" | March 2, 2021 | N/A |
| 208 | 16 | "Basement Bust" | March 9, 2021 | N/A |
| 209 | 17 | "Tennessee Whiskey" | March 16, 2021 | N/A |
| 210 | 18 | "Two Tons of Fun" | March 23, 2021 | N/A |
| 211 | 19 | "Moonshine Capitol Returns" | March 30, 2021 | N/A |
| 212 | 20 | "Backwoods Bonanza" | April 6, 2021 | N/A |
| 213 | Special | "Code and Conflict" | April 13, 2021 | N/A |

=== Season 11 (2021–22) ===
| No. overall | No. in season | Title | Original release date | U.S. viewers (millions) |
|---|---|---|---|---|
| 214 | Special | "New Season Kickoff Summit" | October 20, 2021 | 0.68 |
| 215 | 1 | "Boom Time for Moonshine" | October 27, 2021 | 0.75 |
| 216 | 2 | "Holy Grail of Moonshine" | November 3, 2021 | 0.92 |
| 217 | 3 | "Oh Josh, Where Art Thou?" | November 10, 2021 | 1.03 |
| 218 | 4 | "Backwoods Old Fashioned" | November 17, 2021 | 1.05 |
| 219 | 5 | "Like Water for Moonshine" | November 24, 2021 | 1.00 |
| 220 | 6 | "Champagne or Shine Pain?" | December 1, 2021 | 0.96 |
| 221 | 7 | "Bottle Shock" | December 8, 2021 | 0.97 |
| 222 | 8 | "Mountain Mayhem" | December 15, 2021 | 0.87 |
| 223 | 9 | "Young Guns" | December 22, 2021 | 1.03 |
| 224 | 10 | "Appalachian Ambrosia" | January 5, 2022 | 1.08 |
| 225 | 11 | "Hard Seltzer" | January 12, 2022 | 1.04 |
| 226 | 12 | "Under Pressure" | January 19, 2022 | 1.01 |
| 227 | 13 | "Moonshine of Mexico" | January 26, 2022 | 1.15 |
| 228 | 14 | "Sweet Home Appalachia" | February 2, 2022 | 1.08 |
| 229 | 15 | "Tennessee Royalty" | February 9, 2022 | 0.91 |
| 230 | Special | "Born to Shine" | February 16, 2022 | N/A |
| 231 | 16 | "High Proof Highlands" | February 23, 2022 | N/A |
| 232 | 17 | "Broken Spanish" | March 2, 2022 | 0.79 |
| 233 | 18 | "Moo Shine" | March 9, 2022 | N/A |
| 234 | 19 | "It Takes Amanda" | March 16, 2022 | N/A |
| 235 | 20 | "Spirit in the Sky" | March 23, 2022 | N/A |
| 236 | 21 | "Burning Down the House" | March 30, 2022 | 1.00 |
| 237 | Special | "Summit of Champions" | April 6, 2022 | N/A |

=== Season 12 (2022–23) ===
| No. overall | No. in season | Title | Original release date | US viewers (millions) |
|---|---|---|---|---|
| 238 | Special | "Rise of the Shine Economy" | November 2, 2022 | N/A |
| 239 | 1 | "High Price of Success" | November 9, 2022 | N/A |
| 240 | 2 | "The Harder They Fall" | November 16, 2022 | 0.66 |
| 241 | 3 | "More Cops Less Copper" | November 23, 2022 | 0.78 |
| 242 | 4 | "Long Arm of Kenny Law" | November 30, 2022 | 0.87 |
| 243 | 5 | "Hell-Bent Detective" | December 7, 2022 | 0.69 |
| 244 | 6 | "Rock Out While the Cop's Out" | December 14, 2022 | N/A |
| 245 | 7 | "The Weevils in the Details" | January 4, 2023 | N/A |
| 246 | 8 | "Still Imploder" | January 11, 2023 | N/A |
| 247 | 9 | "Caffeinated Moonshine" | January 18, 2023 | N/A |
| 248 | 10 | "Foreign Exchange" | January 25, 2023 | N/A |
| 249 | 11 | "Brazilian Bootleg" | February 1, 2023 | N/A |
| 250 | 12 | "Above the Law" | February 8, 2023 | N/A |
| 251 | 13 | "Mystery Moonshiner" | February 15, 2023 | N/A |
| 252 | 14 | "Party Like It's 1999" | March 1, 2023 | N/A |
| 253 | 15 | "On The Road Again" | March 8, 2023 | N/A |
| 254 | 16 | "Hard Evidence" | March 15, 2023 | N/A |
| 255 | 17 | "Maggie Valley Mayhem" | March 22, 2023 | N/A |
| 256 | 18 | "Disappearing Act" | March 29, 2023 | N/A |
| 257 | 19 | "The Box From Brazil" | April 5, 2023 | N/A |
| 258 | 20 | "Shine For End Times" | April 12, 2023 | N/A |

=== Season 13 (2023–24) ===
| No. overall | No. in season | Title | Original release date | US viewers (millions) |
|---|---|---|---|---|
| 259 | Special | "Ozark Outlaws to the Rescue" | December 26, 2023 | 1.343 |
When Josh crashes at 110 mph, Ozark shiners plan a daring bootleg to help.
| 260 | 1 | "Moonshine is a Miracle" | January 2, 2024 | N/A |
Tickle launches a campaign to legalize home distilling, while Mark and Digger devise a plan to distill pallets of unsold light beer into liquor. hobbled by racing injuries, Josh plots his return to making shine. Then, Digger makes a shocking revelation.
| 261 | 2 | "Try That in a Shine Town" | January 9, 2024 | N/A |
| 263 | Special | "Pappygate Conspiracy" | January 16, 2024 | N/A |
| 264 | 3 | "Beer Before Liquor" | January 16, 2024 | N/A |
| 264 | 4 | "The Drunkest President" | January 23, 2024 | N/A |
| 265 | 5 | "Quarter Ton of Backwoods Fun" | January 30, 2024 | N/A |
| 266 | 6 | "Tennessee Spirit" | February 6, 2024 | N/A |
| 267 | 7 | "Legalize It!" | February 13, 2024 | N/A |
| 268 | Special | "The Real McCoy" | February 13, 2024 | N/A |
| 269 | 8 | "Highway Robbery" | February 20, 2024 | N/A |
| 270 | 9 | "Tickle's Restaurant" | April 2, 2024 | N/A |
| 271 | 10 | "Boldest Bootleg" | April 9, 2024 | N/A |
| 272 | 11 | "The Grapes of Grappa" | April 16, 2024 | N/A |
| 273 | 12 | "Carolina Crash Course" | April 23, 2024 | N/A |
| 274 | 13 | "Shine Pods" | April 30, 2024 | N/A |
| 275 | 14 | "Don't Call it Crapple" | May 7, 2024 | N/A |
| 276 | 15 | "Cowboy Legacy" | May 14, 2024 | N/A |
| 277 | 16 | "The Curse of Oaked Bourbon" | May 21, 2024 | N/A |

=== Season 14 (2024–25) ===
| No. overall | No. in season | Title | Original release date | US viewers (millions) |
|---|---|---|---|---|
| 278 | Special | "Murder on Thunder Road" | November 5, 2024 | N/A |
| 279 | 1 | "Backlash From the Backwoods" | November 12, 2024 | N/A |
| 280 | 2 | "Code Enforcement" | November 19, 2024 | N/A |
| 281 | 3 | "Knockout Punch" | November 26, 2024 | N/A |
| 282 | 4 | "Bootleg Bottleneck" | December 3, 2024 | N/A |
| 283 | 5 | "Vengeance is Shine" | December 10, 2024 | N/A |
| 284 | 6 | "Unintended Consequences" | December 17, 2024 | N/A |
| 285 | 7 | "Respect Your Elderberries" | January 7, 2025 | N/A |
| 286 | Special | "The Raid That Changed Moonshine" | January 7, 2025 | N/A |
| 287 | 8 | "Bolt Action" | January 14, 2025 | N/A |
| 288 | 9 | "Smokin' Barrels" | January 21, 2025 | N/A |
| 289 | 10 | "Floodwater Runs Deep" | January 28, 2025 | N/A |
| 290 | 11 | "Strange Brew" | February 4, 2025 | N/A |
| 291 | 12 | "Spousal Privilege" | February 11, 2025 | N/A |
| 292 | 13 | "Poaching Pumpkins" | February 18, 2025 | N/A |
| 293 | 14 | "Persons of Interest" | February 25, 2025 | N/A |
| 294 | 15 | "Imposter Syndrome" | March 4, 2025 | N/A |
| 295 | 16 | "Resisting Arrest" | March 11, 2025 | N/A |

=== Season 15 (2026) ===
| No. overall | No. in season | Title | Original release date | US viewers (millions) |
|---|---|---|---|---|
| 296 | 1 | "Born Tax-Free" | January 6, 2026 | N/A |
| 297 | Special | "Sin City, Alabama" | January 6, 2026 | N/A |
| 298 | 2 | "Outlaw Redemption" | January 13, 2026 | N/A |
| 299 | Special | "Brooklyn Whiskey Wars" | January 13, 2026 | N/A |
| 300 | 3 | "Proof or Consequences" | January 20, 2026 | N/A |
| 301 | Special | "Seaside Speakeasy Conspiracy" | January 20, 2026 | N/A |
| 302 | 4 | "Stashes to Ashes" | January 27, 2026 | N/A |
| 303 | 5 | "Dead Drops Don't Lie" | February 3, 2026 | N/A |
| 304 | 6 | "Goldshiner" | February 10, 2026 | N/A |
| 305 | 7 | "A New Tariff in Town" | February 17, 2026 | N/A |
| 306 | 8 | "Kentucky Kingpin" | February 24, 2026 | N/A |
| 307 | 9 | "Run for the Border" | March 3, 2026 | N/A |
| 308 | 10 | "Confiscated Copper Conundrum" | March 10, 2026 | N/A |
| 309 | 11 | "Penny Wise, Impound Foolish" | March 17, 2026 | N/A |
| 310 | 12 | "Braking Badly" | March 24, 2026 | N/A |
| 311 | 13 | "Spirit Animal" | March 31, 2026 | N/A |
| 312 | 14 | "Cocke County Crackdown" | April 7, 2026 | N/A |
| 313 | 15 | "Wanted Drunk or Alive" | April 14, 2026 | N/A |
| 314 | 16 | "Outlaw & Order" | April 21, 2026 | N/A |
