= Cathedral of St Michael and St George, Aldershot =

Coordinates: 51.2599°N 0.7598°W

St Michael and St George Cathedral
- Cathedral Church of St Michael and St George
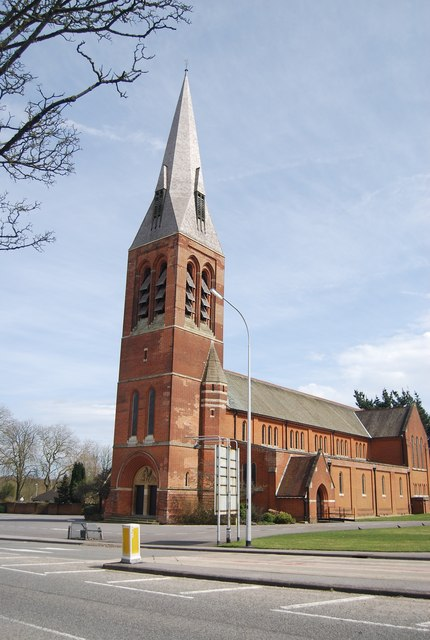

- Shown within Hampshire
- OS grid reference: SU 86636 51922
- Location: Aldershot, Hampshire
- Country: England
- Denomination: Roman Catholic
- Website: Official website

Architecture
- Style: Romanesque
- Years built: 1892

Administration
- Diocese: Bishopric of the Forces

Clergy
- Bishop: Paul Mason

Cathedral Church of St Michael and St George serves as the Roman Catholic cathedral for the Bishopric of the Forces. Located on Queens Avenue in Aldershot, England, the building was originally intended to be the principal church for the Anglican chaplaincies of the British Army but since 1973 it has been the seat of the Roman Catholic Bishop of the Forces.

== History ==
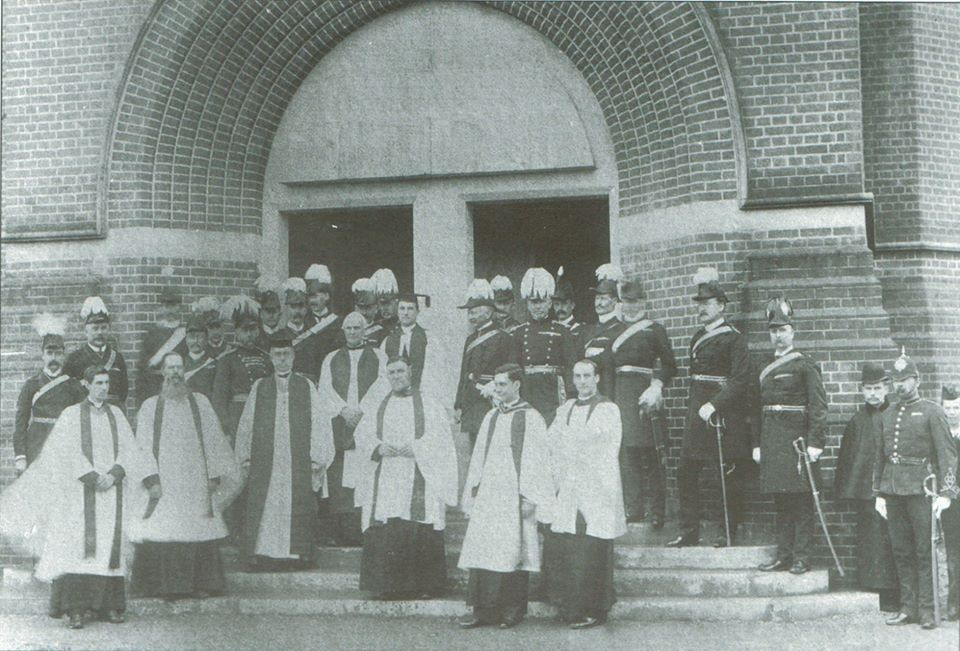
Clergy and officers at the consecration of St George's Garrison Church (1893)

The church was designed in 1892 in the Early English Gothic Revival style by Ingers Bell and Aston Webb of the War Office. The church was built by J. Davey of Brentwood, Essex and was dedicated to St George.

Because the building was originally intended as the principal church for the Anglican chaplaincies of the British Army, the foundation stone was laid by Queen Victoria on 27 June 1892. The trowel and mallet she used in the ceremony are exhibited in the cathedral's west porch.

St George's was consecrated on 7 October 1893 by the Rt. Rev. Anthony Thorold, the Bishop of Winchester, in the presence of Queen Victoria and other members of the royal family.

The Catholics, in the meantime, were worshipping in the Church of St Michael and St Sebastian which had been erected in 1855 opposite the Louise Margaret Hospital. This church was a large wooden building not unlike a barn in appearance, and was constructed mainly of cast iron with internal wooden pillars. The nave had many windows filled with stained glass.

By the early 1970s St George's was not required by the Anglican chaplaincies because the Church of England had two underused churches in the area while the number of Catholic soldiers was increasing; so, in 1973 it became the seat of the Roman Catholic Bishop of the Forces instead and was dedicated to St Michael and St George.

The wooden Church of St Michael and St Sebastian, no longer being required as a Catholic place of worship, became an Army store until it burned in 1983.

The Royal Army Service Corps has had a very long and close association with the church, holding a memorial service there each year on a Sunday in July. The Corps' Chapel of Remembrance stands to the South of the Sanctuary and contains memorials and books of remembrance.

== Architecture and interior ==
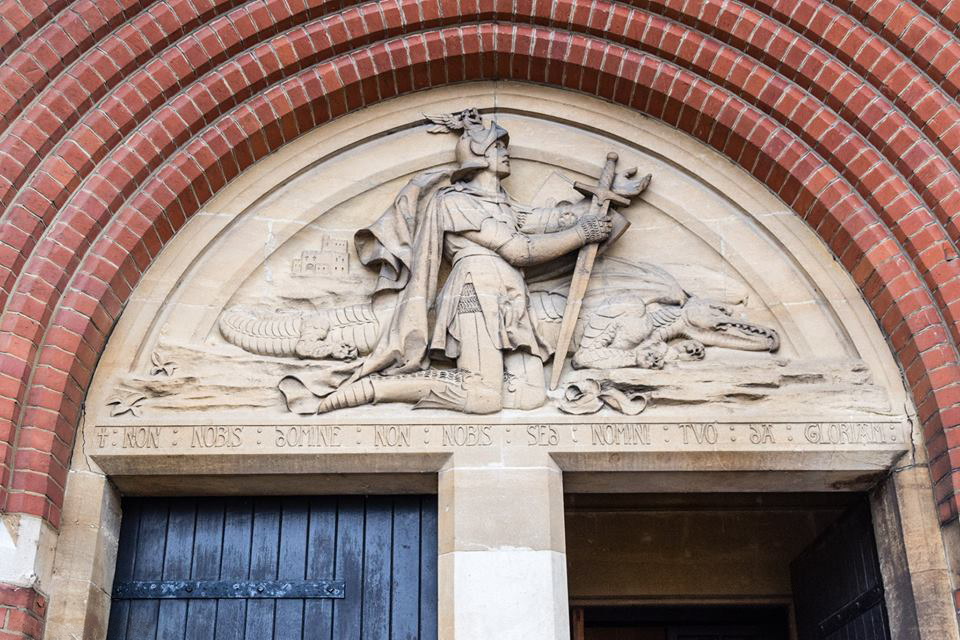
Frieze of St George over the main doors

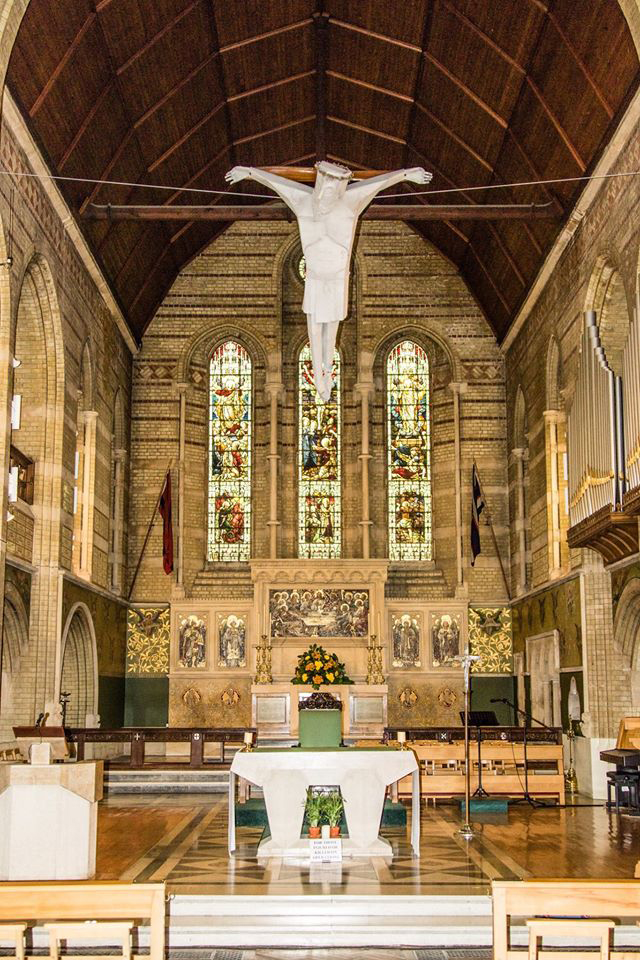
The sanctuary

Long and red-brick with Portland stone facings and with a tall tower topped by a red-brick spire, the church is a prominent local landmark. Above the main door is a relief of Saint George kneeling over the slain dragon.

The yellow-brick interior has broad aisles and a wide nave of five bays of Early English style arches and a debased Romanesque clerestory of two windows above each arch.

On the south aisle are a series of red marble tablets set in a carved Portland stone frieze commemorating members of the Royal Army Service Corps (RASC) who died on active service 1882 - 1920. The cathedral has many fine stained glass windows of saints and Biblical scenes by Heaton, Butler and Bayne. One window in the south wall of the Royal Army Service Corps Memorial Chapel is dedicated to the memory of Julia Horatia Ewing, the wife of Colonel Alexander Ewing who wrote the hymn Jerusalem the Golden. Mrs Ewing was an author who chronicled and illustrated the everyday life of the ordinary soldier in Aldershot. The reason some of the stained glass windows do not fill their niches is because these were moved to the cathedral following the closure of the Church of St Michael and St Sebastian in 1973.

The ornate east end, with a rich 1930s mosaic on the reredos portraying the Last Supper, contrasts with the simplicity of the rest of the chancel, which was reordered to provide room for a free-standing plain altar. The East Window over the altar is dedicated to the men of the Royal Army Service Corps who lost their lives during the Boer War of 1899–1902. Tablets in the Sanctuary commemorate the 376 men who died. The window depicts The Ascension, The Translation of Elijah, The Crucifixion, Moses and the brazen serpent and Samson carrying off the Gates of Gaza. The memorial to those who fell in World War I consists of the mural decorations in the Sanctuary and Chancel.

The Blessed Sacrament Chapel on the south side of the nave was constructed in 1998. The brass panels in the lower part of the screen were originally in the altar rail of the Church of St Michael and St Sebastian. The Lady Chapel has a particularly fine mosaic dedicated to the Army Chaplains who lost their lives in the Boer War of 1899–1902.

The chancel furnishings are sparse and modern. On the south side of the chancel, the bishop's throne is a simple, substantial wooden chair, surmounted by a banner. The cathedral is sometimes the venue for musical concerts.

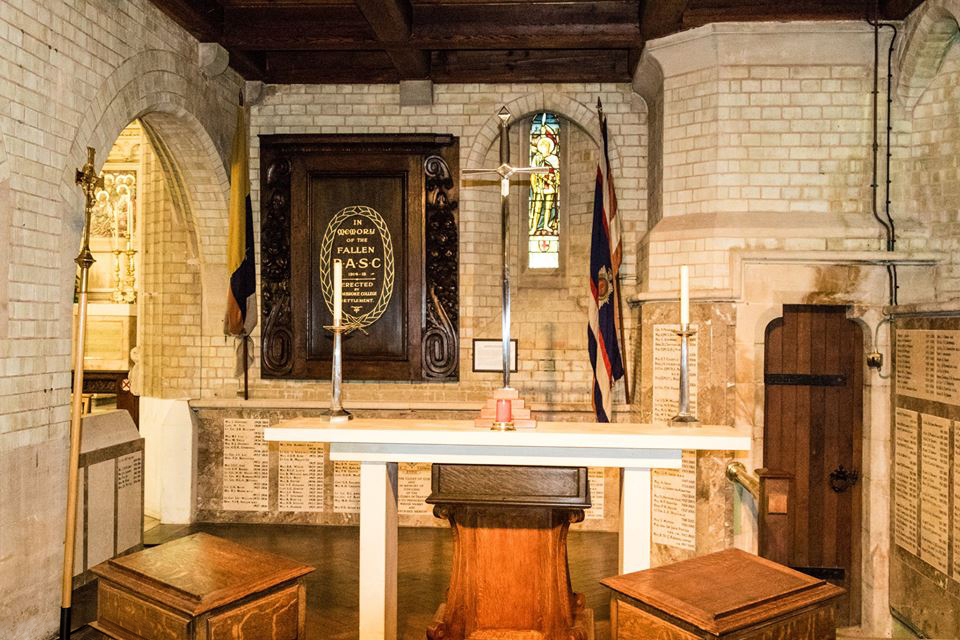
The chapel dedicated to the Royal Army Service Corps

The main organ was built and installed by Hele & Co of Plymouth in 1908 at a cost of £950. However, despite a comprehensive refurbishment this organ is no longer used mainly because of asbestos being found in the organ pipe gallery. The Allen organ currently used in the cathedral originally belonged to the noted organist Carlo Curley and was obtained in 2014 after his death. The wooden screens to the two side chapels were carved by Robert 'Mouse' Thompson with each displaying his characteristic mouse.

In 2015 a sanctuary crucifix made from the parts of 23 aircraft dating from the 1930s to the present was blessed and dedicated in the cathedral. Constructed by Yorkshire-based blacksmith Chris Raw, the crucifix was described as "a fitting and deeply significant link to those of us who serve in the Royal Air Force and our colleagues who went before us especially those who lost their lives in the service of their country".

The cathedral was Grade II listed in 1979 for its special architectural and historic interest.

== Gallery ==
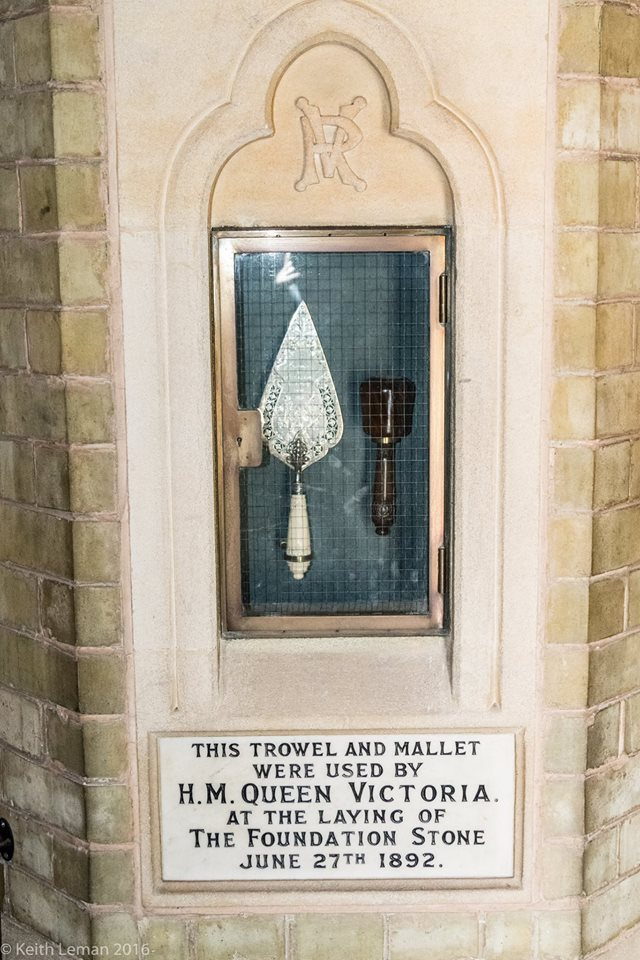
Trowel and mallet used by Queen Victoria at the dedication ceremony in 1892

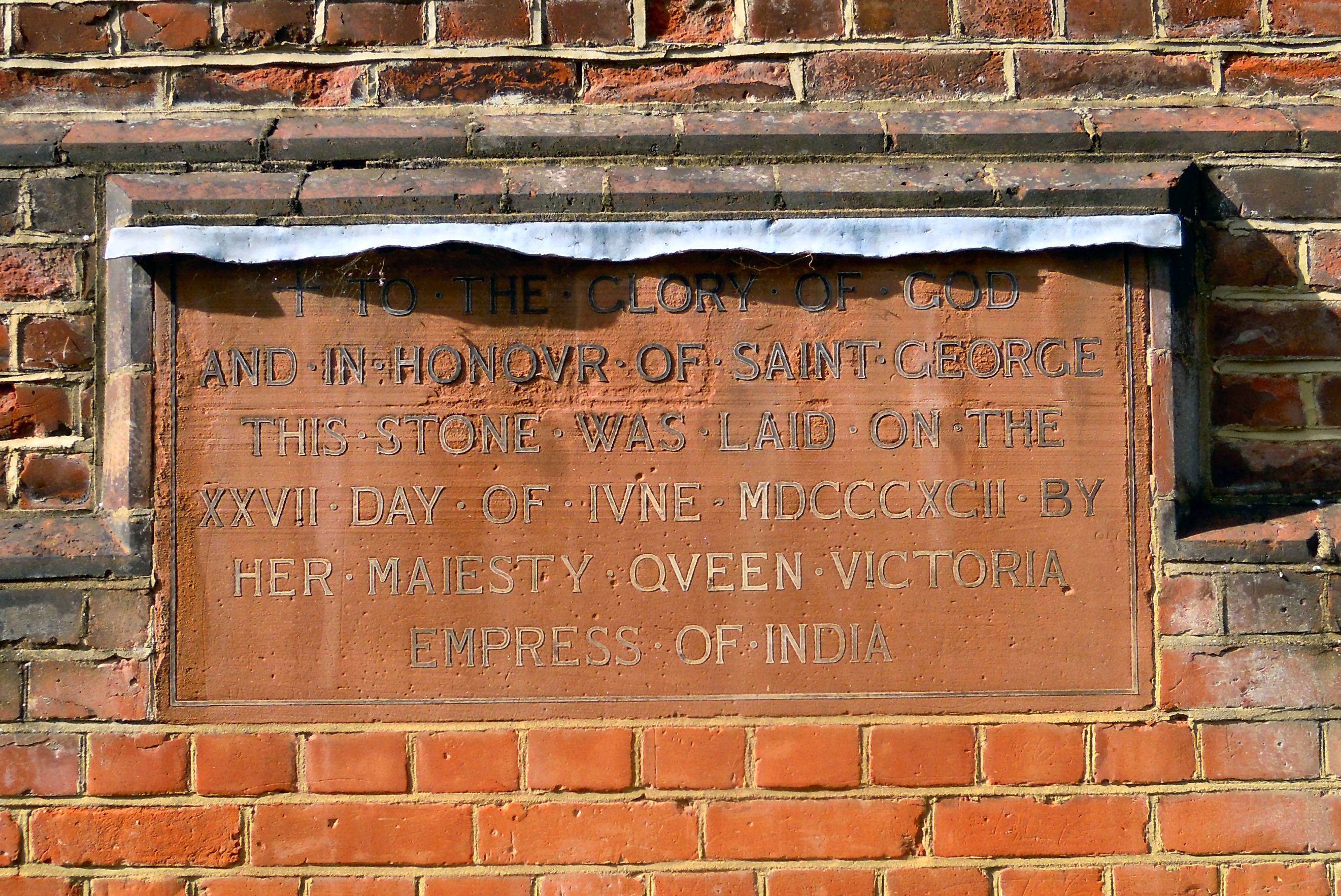
The foundation stone laid by Queen Victoria in 1892

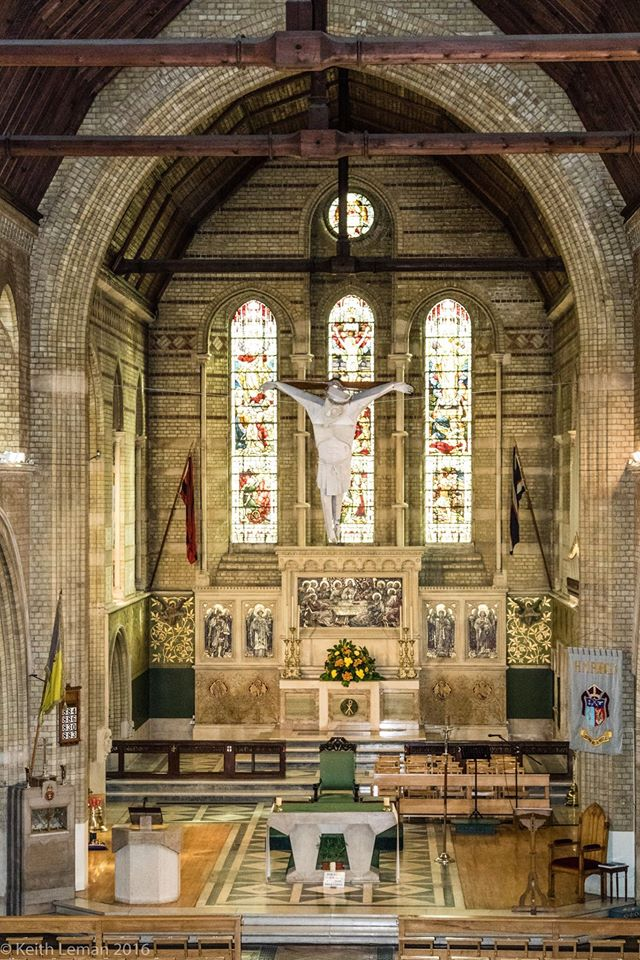
The nave from the balcony

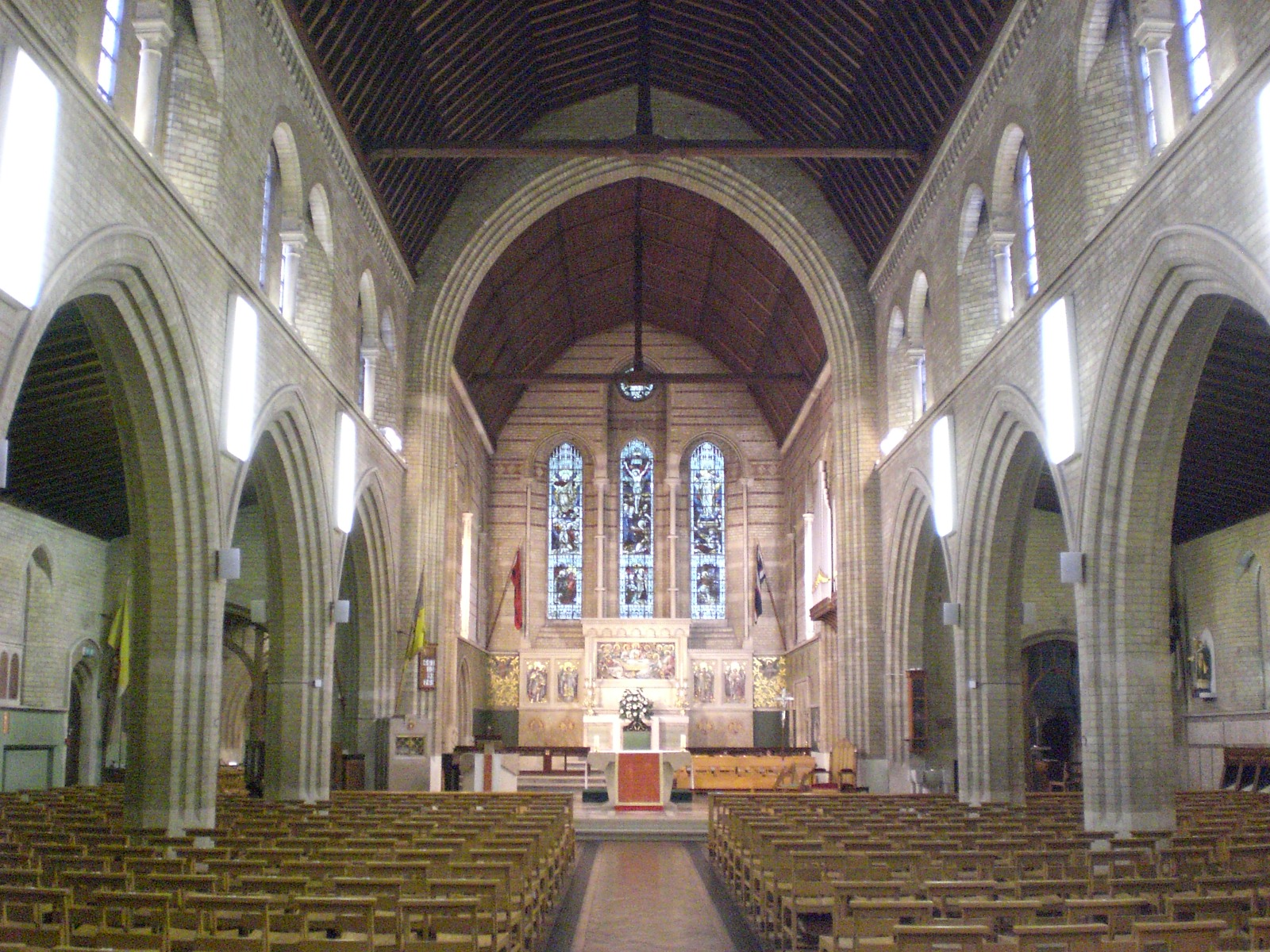
The nave

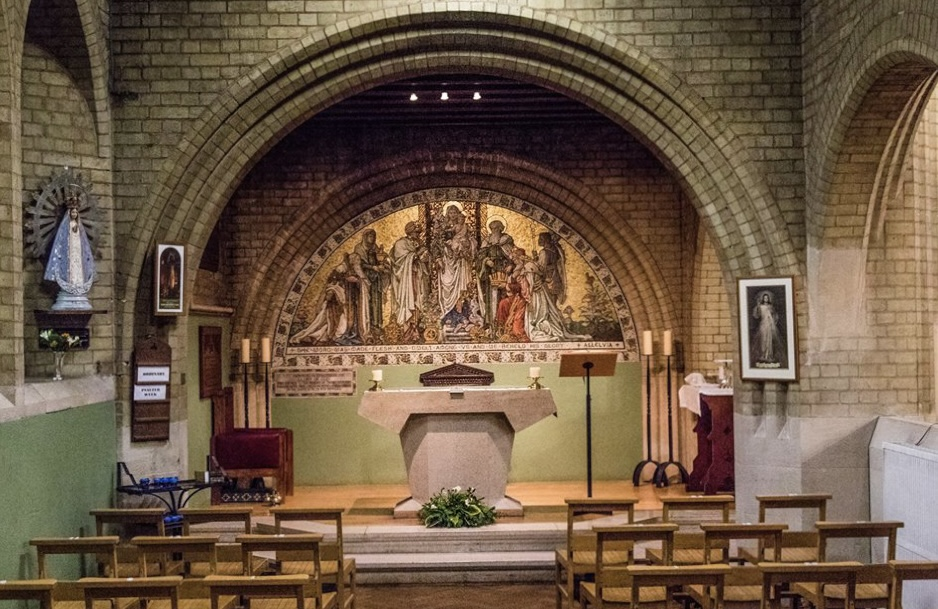
The Lady Chapel

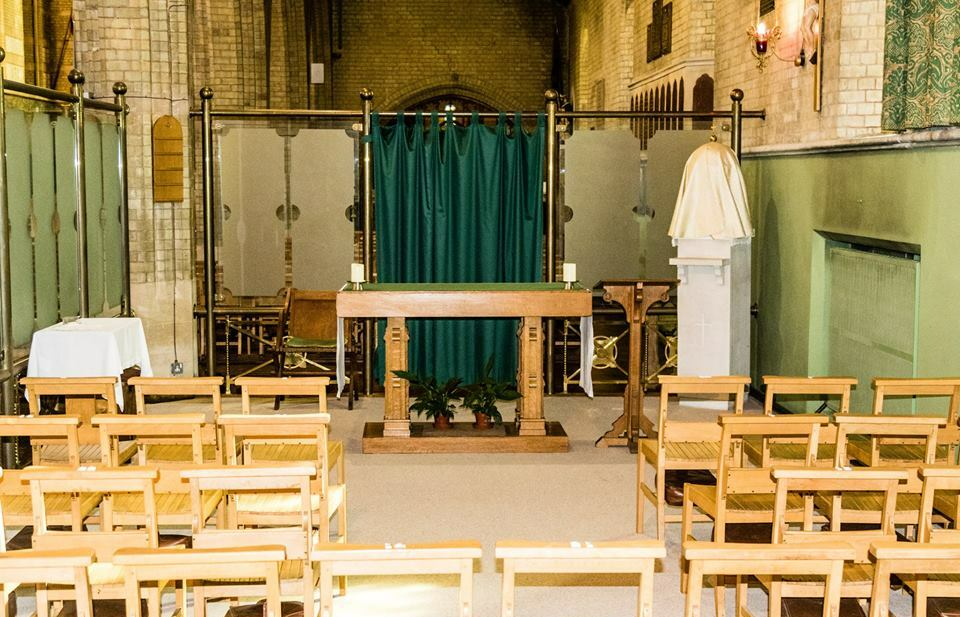
The Blessed Sacrament Chapel

== See also ==
- Catholic Church in England and Wales
- Bishopric of the Forces
