= Paul Mason (bishop) =

English prelate of the Roman Catholic Church

The Right Reverend Paul Mason
- Bishop of the Forces
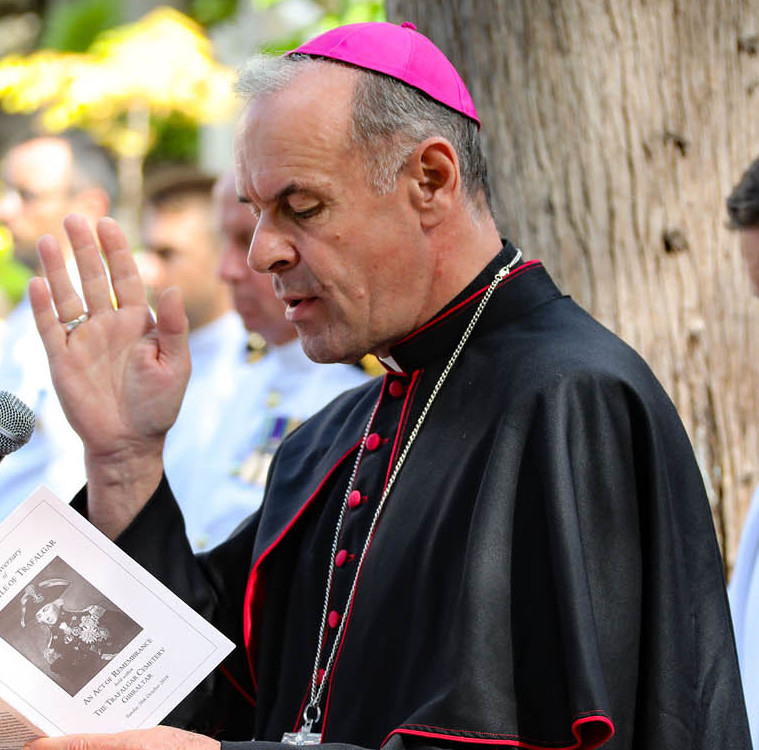
- Bishop Mason in 2019
- Church: Roman Catholic Church
- See: Bishopric of the Forces
- Appointed: 9 July 2018
- Predecessor: Richard Moth
- Previous post: Auxiliary Bishop of Southwark (2016–2018)

Orders
- Ordination: 25 July 1998 by Archbishop Michael Bowen
- Consecration: 31 May 2016 by Archbishop Peter Smith

Personal details
- Born: Paul James Mason; 6 November 1962 (age 64) North Shields, Northumberland, England
- Denomination: Roman Catholic

Paul James Mason (born 6 November 1962) is an English prelate of the Roman Catholic Church, who previously served as Episcopal Vicar in the Metropolitan Archdiocese of Southwark with responsibility for the County of Kent and the Medway Unitary Authority. He is now the Ordinary of the Bishopric of the Forces.

== Early life and education ==
Mason was born on 6 November 1962 in North Shields, Northumberland, England. He was educated at St Anselms RC High School, North Shields. He undertook studies for the priesthood at the English College, Rome where he completed his STB as well as a Licentiate in Philosophy. He also received an MA from King's College London in Medical Law and Ethics.

== Ordained ministry ==
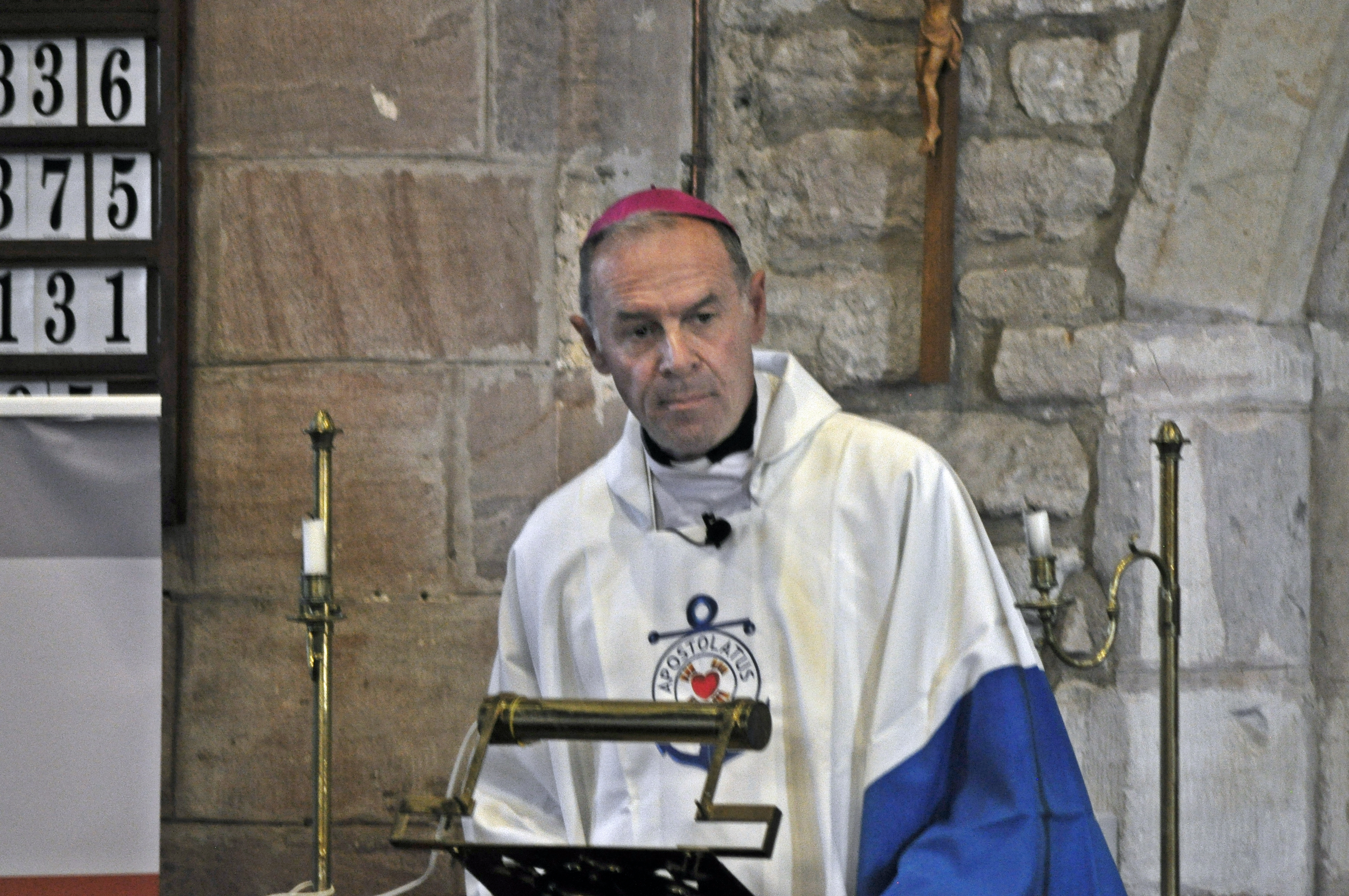
Bishop Mason in 2023

Mason was ordained to the priesthood on 25 July 1998. His first pastoral appointment was from 1998 to 2001 in Purley, London. After this he was Senior Chaplain to Guy's and St Thomas' NHS Foundation Trust from 2001 to 2012. Mason then took up the role of Pastoral Director at Allen Hall Seminary as well as Diocesan Director of Ongoing Formation of Priests. In 2014 he was appointed as Episcopal Vicar for parishes in Kent and the Medway area.

=== Episcopal ministry ===
On 23 April 2016, Mason was appointed an Auxiliary Bishop in the Diocese of Southwark by Pope Francis with the title of Titular Bishop of Skálholt, and ordained bishop at St George's Cathedral, Southwark, by Archbishop Peter Smith, on 31 May 2016. He continued overseeing the parishes in Kent and the Medway area.

On 9 July 2018, Mason was appointed Ordinary of the Bishopric of the Forces by Pope Francis, and took canonical possession of his see during the installation Mass in his cathedral on 12 September 2018. On 17 March 2020, Bishop Paul issued a decree granting juridical personality to the Catholic Military Association.

== Return of the Lady of Luján statue ==
On 30 October 2019, Paul Mason was involved with the return of the Our Lady of Luján statue which was captured during the Falklands War back to Argentina. In exchange for the return of the statue, Bishop Santiago Olivera of the Argentine Forces gave Mason an exact replica for Britain to keep. Both statues also received the blessing of Pope Francis, who oversaw the exchange as it took place in the Vatican. Pope Francis, who was Argentine, also agreed to commemorate the service personnel of both the UK and Argentina who died during the conflict. Olivera also described the gesture with Mason as "a sign of fraternity." Mason has also made plans to visit Argentina and the Basilica of Luján in February 2020.
