= James Dey =

English prelate

The Right Reverend James Dey DSO
- Vicar Apostolic for Great Britain, Military
- Church: Roman Catholic Church
- Appointed: 13 April 1935
- Predecessor: William Keatinge
- Successor: in abeyance
- Other post: Titular Bishop of Sebastopolis in Armenia (1935–1946)

Orders
- Ordination: 17 February 1894
- Consecration: 2 June 1935 by Arthur Hinsley

Personal details
- Born: 14 October 1869 Walsall, Staffordshire, England
- Died: 8 May 1946 (aged 76)
- Education: St Mary's College, Oscott
- Military career
- Allegiance: United Kingdom
- Branch: British Army; Royal Air Force
- Service years: 1903–1929
- Rank: Lieutenant Colonel (British Army); Group Captain (RAF)
- Units: Army Chaplains' Department; Chaplains Branch
- Conflicts: First World War
- Awards: Distinguished Service Order (1917); Mentioned in despatches

James Dey, DSO (14 October 1869 – 8 May 1946) was an English prelate of the Roman Catholic Church. He served as the Bishop of the Forces from 1935 to 1946.

Dey attended seminary at Oscott College and was ordained to the priesthood in 1894. He then spent the next seven years as a schoolteacher and then headmaster. In 1903, he left his school to become a military chaplain and was commissioned in the Army Chaplains' Department, British Army. He served mainly in South Africa, but with the outbreak of the First World War, he served in France on the Western Front. He was then once more posted to southern Africa, to the South West Africa campaign. He ended the war as vicar general to William Keatinge, the first Vicar Apostolic for Great Britain, Military, and having been awarded the Distinguished Service Order.

After the end of the war, Dey transferred to the Chaplains Branch of the newly created Royal Air Force, and was appointed principal Catholic chaplain. He retired from the military in 1929, and was appointed rector of Oscott College. In 1935, he was appointed Vicar Apostolic of Great Britain, Military, in succession to Keatinge, and he was subsequently consecrated as Titular Bishop of Sebastopolis in Armenia. He died in office, aged 76.

== Biography ==
Dey was born on 14 October 1869 in Walsall, Staffordshire, England. He was educated at St Mary's College, Oscott, a Catholic seminary.

He was ordained to the priesthood on 17 February 1894. His early career was a school teacher: at Cotton College from 1894 to 1900, and at St Edmund's College, Ware from 1900 to 1902. He then returned to Cotton College as its headmaster in 1902. However, after only two year, he left to become a military chaplain.

On 7 August 1903, Dey was commissioned in the Army Chaplains' Department, British Army, as a chaplain to the forces 4th class (equivalent in rank to captain). His early service was in South Africa, following the Second Boer War. On 7 August 1913, he was promoted to chaplain to the forces 3rd class (equivalent to major). In 1914, with the outbreak of the First World War, he was posted to France as chaplain to the Connaught Rangers, 2nd Infantry Division, as part of the British Expeditionary Force. As such, he was with them during the Great Retreat from Mons in August and September 1914. He was then based at the Base Hospital in Wimereux, Pas-de-Calais, before travelling to South Africa to serve as senior Roman Catholic chaplain to the imperial forces under General Jan Smuts during the South West Africa campaign. On 1 January 1917, he was appointed Companion of the Distinguished Service Order (DSO) "in connection with Military Operations in the Field". In the latter part of the war, he served as principal staff chaplain and vicar general to William Keatinge, the first Vicar Apostolic for Great Britain, Military. On 7 August 1918, he was promoted to chaplain to the forces 2nd class (equivalent to lieutenant colonel).

On 9 December 1918, after the end of the First World War, he transferred to the Chaplains Branch of the Royal Air Force as principal Catholic chaplain in the relative rank of colonel. In 1920, he was granted the relative rank of group captain. In 1928, he was appointed Domestic Prelate to Pope Pius XI; this was a title of honour that granted the title Monsignor. He was placed on the retired list on 17 October 1929, thereby ending his first stint as a military chaplain.

In 1929, Dey was appointed head of St Mary's College, Oscott, his former seminary, by Thomas Leighton Williams, the new Archbishop of Birmingham. He was promoted to protonotary apostolic in 1931, the most senior rank of Monsignor.

He was appointed the Bishop of the Forces and Titular Bishop of Sebastopolis in Armenia by the Holy See on 13 April 1935. His consecration to the Episcopate took place on 2 June 1935, the principal consecrator was Cardinal Arthur Hinsley, Archbishop of Westminster, and the principal co-consecrators were Archbishop Thomas Leighton Williams of Birmingham and Bishop Ambrose James Moriarty of Shrewsbury. On 28 January 1936, he took part in the funeral procession of George V from Westminster Hall to Windsor, as one of seven selected military chaplains. He was aware that war was coming, and did his best to maintain and prepare the smaller, inter-war batch of Catholic chaplains. During the Second World War, he was additionally Vicar Delegate for Catholic American servicemen who were serving in Britain.

He died in office on 8 May 1946, aged 76.

Catholic Church titles
Preceded by William Keatinge	Bishop of the Forces; 1935–1946	Succeeded by David Mathew
