= Moonshiners (TV series) =

American docudrama television series

- Logo
- Genre: Docudrama
- Narrated by: Jeremy Schwartz
- Country of origin: United States
- No. of seasons: 14
- No. of episodes: 295 (list of episodes)

Production
- Running time: 60 minutes

Original release
- Network: Discovery Channel
- Release: December 6, 2011 – present

Related
- Tickle (2013); Moonshiners: Whiskey Business (2019) series 13

Moonshiners is an American docudrama television series on the Discovery Channel produced by Magilla Entertainment that dramatizes the life of people who produce (illegal) moonshine in the Appalachian Mountains of Kentucky, North Carolina, South Carolina, Tennessee, and Virginia. The series dramatizes their liquor production efforts, law-evading techniques and life. There have been claims by local officials that the show is not what it portrays itself to be. Virginia authorities have stated that no illegal liquor is actually being produced by the people depicted in the show. The Virginia Department of Alcoholic Beverage Control (ABC) said in March 2012 that, "If illegal activity was actually taking place, the Virginia ABC Bureau of Law Enforcement would have taken action." They also said that they had requested for the producer to add a disclaimer to clarify that the show was only a dramatization, "but the request was overlooked", and the show's producer, Magilla Entertainment, have stated its documentary content is real.

Portions of the show that feature Marvin "Popcorn" Sutton were taken from a documentary film by Neal Hutcheson. Hutcheson's documentary was filmed and released in 2002, called This is the Last Dam Run of Likker I'll Ever Make. In 2008, a version of the documentary that was edited for television was broadcast on PBS and the Documentary Channel with the title The Last One, and it received a Southeast Emmy Award in 2009. Sutton was arrested in 2007 by ATF agents in Cocke County, Tennessee (led by Jim Cavanaugh of Waco siege fame) for illegally distilling liquor and possession of a handgun by a felon, and was sentenced to eighteen months in jail in 2009. He subsequently died by suicide, apparently to avoid serving the federal prison term.

The series premiered on December 6, 2011.

The fifteenth season premiered on January 6, 2026.

== Series overview ==
| Season | Episodes | Specials | Originally released | | Average rating (millions) |
| Season | Episodes | Specials | First released | Last released | Average rating (millions) |
|---|---|---|---|---|---|
| 1 | 6 | 1 | December 6, 2011 | January 4, 2012 | 2.76 |
| 2 | 12 | 3 | November 7, 2012 | January 30, 2013 | 3.03 |
| 3 | 13 | 7 | November 5, 2013 | February 4, 2014 | 2.53 |
| 4 | 14 | 10 | November 4, 2014 | February 3, 2015 | 2.00 |
| 5 | 17 | 1 | November 17, 2015 | March 8, 2016 | 1.85 |
| 6 | 17 | 5 | November 15, 2016 | March 14, 2017 | TBA |
| 7 | 18 | 12 | November 15, 2017 | March 27, 2018 | 1.59 |
| 8 | 18 | 10 | December 11, 2018 | July 9, 2019 | TBA |
| 9 | 17 | 4 | November 19, 2019 | May 9, 2020 | TBA |
| 10 | 20 | 7 | November 23, 2020 | April 13, 2021 | TBA |
| 11 | 21 | 2 | October 20, 2021 | March 30, 2022 | TBA |
| 12 | 20 | 5 | November 2, 2022 | April 10, 2023 | TBA |
| 13 | 16 | 3 | December 26, 2023 | May 21, 2024 | TBA |
| 14 | 16 | 2 | November 5, 2024 | March 11, 2025 | TBA |
| 15 | 16 | 3 | January 6, 2026 | April 21, 2026 | TBA |

== Spinoffs ==
In May 2013, it was announced that Moonshiners was renewed for a third season, and that Discovery Channel would purchase a spinoff about Steven Ray Tickle, called Tickle. The series premiered on August 13, 2013.

In February 2019, a new series titled Moonshiners: Whiskey Business was announced through Discovery Channel. It spun from a Moonshiners season seven special titled Whiskey Business, in which Tim Smith travels to help out struggling Missouri Ridge Distillery and keep them in business. Four more episodes were made to air at the end of season 8 of Moonshiners. The spin-off started airing March 13, 2019.

A new series titled Moonshiners: Master Distiller premiered on March 3, 2020, on Discovery Channel.
