= David Mathew (bishop) =

British bishop and historian

- Vicar Apostolic of the Military of Great Britain
- Church: Catholic Church
- See: Military Vicariate of Great Britain
- In office: 1953 – 23 March 1963
- Predecessor: James Dey
- Successor: Gerard Tickle
- Other post: Titular Archbishop of Apamea in Bithynia (1946-1975)
- Previous posts: Apostolic Delegate to British Eastern and Western Africa (1947-1953); Apostolic Delegate to Africa for the Missions (1946-1947); Titular Bishop of Aeliae (1938-1946); Auxiliary Bishop of Westminster (1938-1946)

Orders
- Ordination: 25 June 1929
- Consecration: 21 December 1938 by Arthur Hinsley

Personal details
- Born: David James Mathew; 15 January 1902 Lyme Regis, Dorset, United Kingdom of Great Britain and Ireland
- Died: 12 December 1975 (aged 73) London, United Kingdom

David James Mathew (15 January 1902 – 12 December 1975) was a British Roman Catholic bishop and historian.

== Biography ==
Mathew was born at Lyme Regis, Dorset, and educated at the naval colleges at Osborne and Dartmouth. He served as a midshipman in the Royal Navy at the end of World War I.

He entered Balliol College, Oxford, in 1920 and received a degree in modern history in 1923. He then went to Beda College in Rome, with the intention of seeking ordination and with a plan to enter the Carthusian order. He was ordained in 1929, and spent 10 months as a novice at St Hugh's Charterhouse, Parkminster, West Sussex, before concluding that he did not have a monastic vocation.

After service at St David's Cathedral, Cardiff, he went to London to become chaplain to the Roman Catholic community at the University of London. In 1938 he was appointed Auxiliary Bishop of Westminster. He served in London through the Blitz. In 1945 he was named apostolic visitor to Ethiopia, and in 1946 apostolic delegate to the British colonies in Africa.

This brought his consecration to the titular Archbishopric of Apamea. His service in Africa was successful, and he helped carry out the Vatican's policy of preparing for the appointment of native African bishops, acting as principal consecrator of Laurean Rugambwa after his appointment as Apostolic Vicar of Lower Kagera: Rugambwa later became the first African cardinal since the days of the early church.

Upon Mathew's return to England in 1953, he was appointed bishop-in-ordinary to the British Armed Forces. (He had refused an appointment to the nunciature in Bern, hoping to receive an English diocese). Mathew retired in 1963 and spent the rest of his life writing history. He died in London on 12 December 1975, aged 73.

== Publications ==
- The Celtic Peoples and Renaissance Europe (1933)
- The Reformation and the Contemplative Life (1934)
- Catholicism in England, 1535-1935. Portrait of a Minority: Its Culture and Tradition (1936)
- Steam Packet (1936)
- The Jacobean Age (1938)
- British Seamen (1943)
- The Naval Heritage (1944)
- Acton: The Formative Years (1946)
- Ethiopia: The Study of a Polity, 1540-1935 (1947)
- The Social Structure in Caroline England (1948)
- Sir Tobie Mathew (1950)
- The Mango on the Mango Tree (1950)
- The Age of Charles I (1951)
- In Vallombrosa (1952)
- The Prince of Wales's Feathers (1953)
- Scotland under Charles I (1955)
- James I (1967)
- Lord Acton and His Times (1968)
- The Courtiers of Henry VIII (1970)
- Lady Jane Grey (1972)

Catholic Church titles
Preceded by James Dey	Bishop of the Forces; 1954–1963	Succeeded by Gerard William Tickle
