= Francis Walmsley =

English Catholic bishop

Francis Walmsley CBE
- Bishop of the Forces in Great Britain
- Church: Catholic Church
- See: Bishopric of the Forces in Great Britain
- In office: 8 January 1979 – 24 May 2002
- Predecessor: Gerard Tickle
- Successor: Tom Burns
- Previous posts: Titular Bishop of Tamalluma (1979-1998)

Orders
- Ordination: 30 May 1953
- Consecration: 22 February 1979 by Gerard Tickle

Personal details
- Born: Francis Joseph Walmsley; 9 November 1926 Woolwich, London, United Kingdom
- Died: 26 December 2017 (aged 91) Reading, Berkshire, United Kingdom

Francis Joseph Walmsley CBE (9 November 1926 – 26 December 2017) was an English prelate of the Catholic Church. He served as the Bishop of the Forces from 1979 to 2002.

Born in Woolwich on 9 November 1926, he was ordained to the priesthood on 30 May 1953. He was appointed the Bishop of the Forces and Titular Bishop of Tamalluma by the Holy See on 8 January 1979. His consecration to the Episcopate took place on 22 February 1979, the principal consecrator was Bishop Gerard Tickle, retired Bishop of the Forces, and the principal co-consecrators were Bishop Mario Conti of Aberdeen (later Archbishop of Glasgow) and Archbishop Michael Bowen of Southwark. During his term the military vicariate of the British Forces was raised to the status of a military ordinariate on 21 July 1986.

He resigned as Titular Bishop of Tamalluma on 7 March 1998 and retired as Bishop of the Forces on 24 May 2002. He died on Boxing Day 2017 in Reading, and is buried in the grounds of St Michael's Abbey, Farnborough.

Catholic Church titles
Preceded by Gerard Tickle	Bishop of the Forces; 1979–2002	Succeeded by Tom Burns
