= William Keatinge =

English prelate

The Right Reverend William Keatinge CMG CBE
- Vicar Apostolic for Great Britain, Military
- Church: Roman Catholic Church
- Appointed: 30 October 1917
- Successor: James Dey
- Other post: Titular Bishop of Metellopolis

Orders
- Ordination: 27 May 1893
- Consecration: 25 February 1918 by Gaetano de Lai

Personal details
- Born: William Lewis Keatinge; 1 August 1869
- Died: 21 February 1934 (aged 64)
- Denomination: Roman Catholic
- Occupation: Military chaplain
- Education: English College, Rome
- Military career
- Allegiance: United Kingdom
- Branch: British Army
- Service years: 1897–1925
- Rank: Principal Chaplain (Brigadier-General)
- Unit: Army Chaplains' Department
- Conflicts: Second Boer War; First World War
- Awards: CMG (1915); CBE (1919); Mentioned in despatches (7 times)

William Lewis Keatinge, CMG, CBE (1 August 1869 – 21 February 1934) was an English prelate of the Roman Catholic Church. After four years as a parish priest, he joined the British Army as a chaplain in 1897. He served in the Second Boer War, and then in the First World War as a senior Catholic chaplain. He was chaplain to the forces 1st class (equivalent to colonel) from 1910, served on the Western Front and the Macedonian front. Finally, he was Vicar Apostolic for Great Britain, Military from 1917, and Principal Roman Catholic Chaplain to the Forces from 1920.

== Biography ==
Keatinge was born on 1 August 1869 in Hackney, London, England. From 1883 to 1887, he was educated at Downside School, then an all-boys independent Catholic boarding school. He then attended seminary at the English College, Rome.

On 27 May 1893, Keatinge was ordained to the priesthood for the Diocese of Southwark during a service at the Basilica of Saint John Lateran in Rome. He spent four years as a parish priest at St. Thomas à Becket Catholic Church, Wandsworth. In 1897, he left parish ministry to become a military chaplain. He was commissioned in the Army Chaplains' Department, British Army, as a chaplain to the forces 4th class (equivalent in rank to captain) on 1 May 1897. He was first posted to Aldershot Garrison in England. From 1899 to 1900, he served in South Africa during the Second Boer War. He was present during the Battle of Colenso, Battle of Spion Kop, and the Relief of Ladysmith. During that war, he was twice mentioned in despatches, and received the Queen's South Africa Medal with 5 clasps.

After leaving South Africa, Keatinge returned to Aldershot. Having already been promoted to chaplain to the forces 3rd class (equivalent to major), he was promoted to chaplain to the forces 2nd class (equivalent to lieutenant colonel) on 29 November 1905. In 1907, he was made a Privy Chamberlain to the Pope Pius X, and thereby granted the title Monsignor. He was promoted to chaplain to the forces 1st class (equivalent to colonel) on 9 November 1910. During the inter-war period, he served twice overseas (Malta and Egypt), and was posted within England to Gosport, Portsmouth and Shorncliffe Army Camp.

With the outbreak of the First World War, Keatinge was appointed senior Catholic chaplain to the British Expeditionary Force, serving in continental Europe. He arrived in France on 18 August 1914, to serve with the 3rd Division of the British Army. He narrowly avoided capture during the Great Retreat from Mons, and was at the First Battle of Ypres. He was mentioned in despatches on 8 October 1914, on 15 October 1915, and for a third time. He was awarded the Military Cross (MC) in the 1915 Birthday Honours: however this award was later cancelled, likely because the MC was meant for officers ranking captain or below, and he held a rank equivalent to colonel. Instead, on 21 July 1915, he was appointed Companion of the Order of Saint Michael and Saint George (CMG) "in recognition of distinguished service in the Field", back-dated to 3 June 1915. In February 1916, he was awarded the Croix d'Officier of the Legion of Honour by the President of France. On 7 December 1916, he was appointed principal chaplain to the British Army on the Macedonian front; as such, he held the equivalent rank of brigadier-general. He was twice mentioned in despatches for service during this time.

With a need for control of the Catholic chaplains to be vested outside of warring diocesan bishops, Keatinge was appointed the first Vicar Apostolic for Great Britain, Military and Titular Bishop of Metellopolis by the Holy See on 30 October 1917. His consecration to the Episcopate took place in Rome on 25 February 1918, the principal consecrator was Cardinal Gaetano de Lai, and the principal co-consecrators were Archbishop Giuseppe Palica and Bishop Algernon Charles Stanley. In May 1919, he had a private audience with the Pope in Rome, during which the Pope praised the gallantry of the British soldiers and chaplains during the First World War. In October 1920, he was appointed Commander of the Order of the British Empire (CBE) "for valuable services rendered in connection with the War"; the award was back-dated to 3 June 1919. In 1920, he was appointed Principal Roman Catholic Chaplain to the Forces. He retired from the British Army on 1 January 1925, and granted retired pay.

He died on 21 February 1934, aged 64. He had hoped to die in Rome, but died in England after an extended illness. He is buried in St Mary's Catholic Cemetery, Kensal Green, London.

Catholic Church titles
New title	Bishop of the Forces; 1917–1934	Succeeded by James Dey
