= Catholic Military Association =

Catholic Military Association of Our Lady of Victories
- Abbreviation: CMA/CMA-UK/CMA-OLV
- Formation: 13 April 2018; 7 years ago
- Type: Association of the faithful in the Catholic Church and Registered Charity
- Registration no.: 1205467 (England and Wales)
- Purpose: Advancing religion and supporting members of HM Armed Forces
- Headquarters: East Sussex, England
- Affiliations: Catholic Church
- Website: catholicmilitaryassociation.org.uk

The Catholic Military Association of Our Lady of Victories (abbreviated CMA) is an association of the faithful of the Catholic Church for the Armed Forces of the United Kingdom. The organisation provides community and spiritual support to serving personnel, veterans and their immediate families, and advances the Catholic religion in the United Kingdom Armed Forces by promoting prayers, events and other charitable works.

The Catholic Military Association is a membership organisation managed by appointed trustees, legally constituted as a Charitable Incorporated Organisation, and having constitutional statutes aligned to the Code of Canon Law in addition to UK charities law.

It is recognised by the Ministry of Defence and the Holy See.

== History and Development ==
The association was founded on 13 Apr 2018 with a public meeting at the Brompton Oratory, establishing itself as a private association of the faithful by the name 'Military Association of Our Lady of Victories'.

In November 2019 the association became a founding organisation of the Defence Christian Network, alongside the Armed Forces Christian Union and Soldiers’ and Aviators’ Scripture Readers Association, thereby becoming part of a recognised Ministry of Defence Staff Network. Then in March 2020 the association was approved by the Bishop in Ordinary to HM Forces Rt Rev Paul Mason, entitling the organisation use "Catholic" in its name. From that point the Military Association of Our Lady of Victories became the Catholic Military Association of Our Lady of Victories, often abbreviated to CMA.

The CMA grew in membership to several hundred serving members by 2022, at which point it accepted the role as national representative to the International Military Apostolate, which consults to the Dicastery for the Laity, Family and Life at the Vatican The national representative was formerly held by the Bishopric of the Forces.

In October 2023 the Catholic Military Association was recognised by the Charity Commission as a Registered Charitable Incorporated Organisation. On the 7th of October 2023, the CMA was consecrated to Our Lady of Victories in Walsingham by Bishop Paul Mason.

In 2023, the Association commissioned what is believed to be the first icon in the world of Our Lady of Victories, written in Ukraine. It was solemnly blessed according to the Byzantine Rite in 2025. A copy of the icon was soon afterwards presented to Pope Leo XIV in private audience by Aid to the Church in Need.

The model of lay-led Catholic spirituality in the armed forces led to the formation of sister organisations in the United States of America in February 2022 and Canada in April 2023.

== Activities ==
The CMA pursues its goals by offering a routine of structured prayer, fellowship, pilgrimages and retreats, by distributing rosaries and miraculous medals, by partnering with other organisations, and arranging prayers for the dead.
