= Tickell =

Tickell is a surname. Notable people with the surname include:

- Adam Tickell (born 1965), British economic geographer
- Brian Tickell (born 1939), English football striker
- Christopher Tickell (born 1964), British Army officer
- Clare Tickell (born 1958), British businesswoman
- Crispin Tickell (1930–2022), British diplomat, environmentalist and academic
- Eustace Tickell (1893–1972), British Army officer
- Frederick Tickell (1857–1919), Australian naval officer
- Jerrard Tickell (1905–1966), Irish novelist
- John Tickell (born 1945), Australian doctor
- Josh Tickell (born 1975), American author
- Kathryn Tickell (born 1967), English piper and fiddler
- Kenneth Tickell (1956–2014), English pipe organ builder and organist
- Oliver Tickell (fl. 21st century), British journalist
- Rebecca Harrell Tickell (born 1980), American actress and activist
- Richard Tickell (1751–1793), English playwright
- Samuel Tickell (1811–1875), British ornithologist
- Thomas Tickell (1685–1740), English poet

== See also ==
- 5971 Tickell, a main-belt asteroid
- Tickell Head
- Tickle (disambiguation)
