= Tickle (TV series) =

- Genre: Docudrama
- Country of origin: United States
- No. of seasons: 1
- No. of episodes: 12

Production
- Production location: Gretna, Virginia
- Running time: 42 minutes

Original release
- Network: Discovery Channel
- Release: August 13 – October 22, 2013

Tickle is an American docudrama television series that aired in 2013 on the Discovery Channel. A spin-off of Moonshiners, the series follows moonshiner Steven Ray Tickle as he attempts to sell a large stash of moonshine that he found in the backwoods of Virginia. Tickle opens a fishing store called "Tickle's Tackle" in the town of Gretna as a front to move the liquor, but discovers that managing a business is more difficult than he expected.

== Episodes ==
No.	Title	Original release date	US viewers (millions)
1	"Whiskey Windfall"	August 13, 2013	1.910
While hunting, Tickle stumbles upon and steals a hidden stash of moonshine. Now, he’s desperate to cover his tracks before the shine's rightful owner comes knocking. A closed-door consultation with local legend Grandpa Bill can provide direction, but at what cost?
2	"Hiding the Hooch"	August 20, 2013	1.560
With a load of moonshine sitting on his lawn, Tickle is a sitting duck. Now he’s facing the task of transporting it to his new warehouse without alerting the law, the shine's rightful owner, or his new secretary Megan.
3	"Cars, Crossbows, and Corn Liquor"	August 27, 2013	1.613
Now that the shine is safely in Tickle's warehouse, the boys make a pact to keep a low profile and not flash their cash, but the pile of third-rate bric-a-brac Tickle has used to fill his shop provokes suspicion in new secretary, Megan.
4	"Spirits in the Spirits"	September 3, 2013	1.483
Tickle’s Tackle is now open and the 'shine is selling fast, but a few bumps in the night have everyone thinking the shop is haunted. Tickle must act fast and convince his 'shine customers that the only spirits in his shop are the kind you drink.
5	"Drunk as a Fish"	September 10, 2013	1.667
Tickle and the boys agree to host a fish fry for charity. Armed only with their hands, wits and plentiful moonshine the boys set out to catch their limit. Megan struggles to sell tickets to the fundraiser, until she thinks of a way to sweeten the pot.
6	"Whiskey Boom"	September 17, 2013	1.552
Shine sales are booming and the cash is burning a hole in Tickle’s pocket, so he decides to have an "explosively" fun birthday party for his dad. Meanwhile, Megan and the guys have a shoot out to determine who gets to be in charge while Tickle is away.
7	"Shined, Sealed, Delivered"	September 24, 2013	1.5
Hoping to bribe their way out of trouble, Tickle and the boys create a discreet delivery service to raise cash. Their motto is "No Questions Asked," but they should have asked themselves if this was really a good idea.
8	"Drunk History"	October 1, 2013	0.855
Tickle tries to make some extra cash by giving historic bus tours to senior citizens. Meanwhile Howard and Mo deal with the not-so-secret news of Megan’s pregnancy and throw her a party for the record books.
9	"White Lightning Fast"	October 8, 2013	TBA
With his shine and money dwindling, Tickle needs some cash. A local auto race is offering a cash prize so the guys sink their remaining capital into a race car. Tickle’s old partner, Tim, shows up with a better car and a burning need to beat Tickle.
10	"Drinks on the House"	October 15, 2013	TBA
Megan makes a commercial for Tickle's Tackle; Tickle and the boys open a casino in the warehouse behind the store.
11	"Shine-squatch"	October 22, 2013	TBA
Tickle’s mysterious enemy is getting closer. When hiding in the carriage house and living off of moonshine fails, it’s time for one last desperate attempt at fast cash. Tickle, Meg, Howard, and Mo pursue three separate schemes.
12	"Death by Moonshine"	October 22, 2013	TBA
When the owner of Tickle’s stolen shine finally catches up with him, it’s going to take a miracle to make it out of this one alive...even if he’s already pretending to be dead.

All episode ratings from Zap2it.
