= Gerard Tickle =

- Bishop of the Forces in Great Britain
- Church: Catholic Church
- See: Bishopric of the Forces in Great Britain
- In office: 12 October 1963 – 24 April 1978
- Predecessor: David Mathew
- Successor: Francis Walmsley
- Other post: Titular Bishop of Bela (1963-1994)

Orders
- Ordination: 28 October 1934
- Consecration: 1 December 1963 by William Heard

Personal details
- Born: Gerard William Tickle; 2 November 1909 Birkenhead, Cheshire, United Kingdom of Great Britain and Ireland
- Died: 14 September 1994 (aged 84)

Styles of Gerard Tickle
- Reference style: The Right Reverend
- Spoken style: My Lord
- Religious style: Bishop

Gerard William Tickle (2 November 1909 – 14 September 1994) was an English prelate of the Roman Catholic Church. He served as the Bishop of the Forces from 1963 to 1978.

Born in Birkenhead in 1909, he was educated at Douai School and ordained to the priesthood on 28 October 1934. He served as Vice-Rector of the English College, Rome 1946-52 and Rector 1952-63. He was appointed the Bishop of the Forces and Titular Bishop of Bela by the Holy See on 12 October 1963. His consecration to the Episcopate took place on 1 December 1963, the principal consecrator was Cardinal William Theodore Heard, and the principal co-consecrators were Cardinal John Carmel Heenan and Bishop William Eric Grasar. He participated in the third and fourth sessions of the Second Vatican Council, held in 1964 and 1965.

Bishop Tickle was the target of an assassination attempt by an Irish republican bomber, Shane Paul O'Doherty, after, O'Doherty later claimed, he had read "... a newspaper story quoting Tickle as saying British soldiers did nothing wrong on Bloody Sunday. The bomb, stuffed into a hollowed-out Bible, failed to detonate."

Tickle resigned as Bishop of the Forces on 24 April 1978, at age 68, but continued as Titular Bishop of Bela until his death on 14 September 1994, aged 84.

Catholic Church titles
Preceded by David James Mathew	Bishop of the Forces; 1963–1978	Succeeded by Francis Joseph Walmsley
