= Bishopric of the Forces in Great Britain =

Catholic ecclesiastical jurisdiction

Bishop of the Forces
- Bishopric

catholic
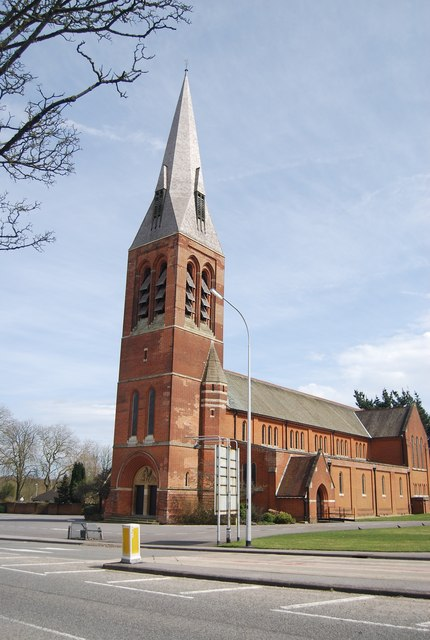
- Incumbent; Paul James Mason

Information
- First holder: Francis Walmsley
- Denomination: Catholic Church
- Sui iuris church: Latin Church
- Rite: Multiple (primarily Roman Rite)
- Established: Military bishopric in 1917, Military vicariate in 1953, Military ordinariate in 1986
- Cathedral: Cathedral of St Michael and St George, Aldershot

Website
- www.rcbishopricforces.org.uk

The Bishopric of the Forces (in Great Britain) is a Latin Church military ordinariate of the Catholic Church which provides chaplains to the British Armed Forces based in the United Kingdom and their overseas postings.

It is exempt, and so immediately subject to the Holy See and the Dicastery for Bishops, and is not part of any ecclesiastical province, whilst being a full member of the Catholic Bishops' Conference of England and Wales. The chaplains are drawn from the dioceses of England, Wales, Scotland, Ireland and the Commonwealth, as well as from some religious orders. Chaplains have spiritual and pastoral care of military personnel and their families.

Until 1986, military ordinariates were called "military vicariates" and had a status similar to that of apostolic vicariates which are headed by a bishop who receives his authority by delegation from the Pope. The apostolic constitution Spirituali Militum Curae of 21 April 1986 by John Paul II raised their status, declaring that the bishop who heads one of them is an "ordinary", holding authority by virtue of his office, and not by delegation from another person in authority.

There is sometimes confusion between the holder of this Catholic post and the Anglican "Bishop to the Forces": for this reason, the former is normally referred to as "the Roman Catholic Bishop of the Forces".

== Offices and statistics ==
The current Bishop of the Forces is the Rt Rev Paul Mason, appointed by Pope Francis on 9 July 2018. The Vicar General of the Bishopric and Dean of the Military Cathedral is Father Nick Gosnell. The chancellor of the Bishopric of the Forces is Rev. Neil Galloway.

The diocesan office and episcopal see, the Cathedral of St Michael and St George (dedicated to traditional patron saints of chivalry and military), are located on Queens Avenue, Aldershot, Hampshire, England.

As of 2014, it has 25 priests (23 diocesan, two religious), two deacons, and two lay religious brothers.

== History ==
From 1917, two individual titular bishops were appointed in succession as Roman Catholic Bishops of the Forces.

On 21 November 1953, a permanent Military Vicariate of Great Britain was established, still led by titular bishops.

On 21 July 1986, it was promoted to Military Ordinariate of Bishopric of the Forces in Great Britain, with its own Ordinary.

== List of bishops ==
Roman Catholic Bishops of the Forces
From	Until	Incumbent	Notes
Military bishopric
1917	1934	William Keatinge	Appointed on 30 October 1917 and consecrated Titular Bishop of Metellopolis on 25 February 1918. Died in office on 21 February 1934.
1935	1946	James Dey	Appointed on 13 April 1935 and consecrated Titular Bishop of Sebastopolis in Armenia on 2 June 1935. Died in office on 8 May 1946.
1946	1954	Sede vacante	
Military vicariate
1954	1963	David Mathew	Previously Apostolic Delegate (papal diplomatic envoy) of British East and West Africa. Consecrated Titular Archbishop of Apamea in Bithynia on 20 February 1946. Appointed on 16 April 1954. Resigned on 23 March 1963 and died on 12 December 1975.
1963	1978	Gerard Tickle	Appointed on 12 October 1963 and consecrated Titular Bishop of Bela on 1 December 1963. Resigned on 24 April 1978 and died on 14 December 1994.
1979	1986	Francis Walmsley	Appointed on 8 January 1979 and consecrated Titular Bishop of Tamalluma on 22 February 1979. Became the first bishop of the military ordinariate at the vicariate's promotion on 21 July 1986.
Military ordinariate
1986	2002	Francis Walmsley	Appointed bishop of the military ordinariate on 21 July 1986. Retired on 24 May 2002 and died on 26 December 2017.
2002	2008	Tom Burns S.M.	Appointed on 24 May 2002 and consecrated on 18 June 2002. Translated to Menevia in 2008.
2009	2015	Richard Moth	Appointed on 25 July 2009 and consecrated on 29 September 2009. Translated to Arundel and Brighton on 21 March 2015.
2018		Paul Mason	Consecrated Titular Bishop of Skálholt on 31 May 2016. Appointed on 9 July 2018 and installed on 12 September 2018

== See also ==
- Catholic Church in England and Wales
- Roman Catholic Archdiocese for the Military Services, USA § Patron saints
- Royal Air Force Chaplains Branch
- Royal Army Chaplains' Department
- Royal Navy Chaplaincy Service

== Sources and external links ==
- Official website
- GCatholic, with Google satellite picture
