= Steven Ray Tickle =

American television personality

- Born: Steven Ray Tickle; November 30, 1976 (age 48)
- Other names: Tickle
- Occupation(s): Carpenter, Restaurant Owner (The Tickles Restaurant) Moonshiner, TV Personality
- Known for: Starring in Moonshiners and Tickle
- Spouse: Carol Ann Tickle (m. 2019)

Steven Ray Tickle, usually referred to as simply "Tickle," is an American television personality, known for his role in Discovery Channel docudramas Moonshiners and Tickle. Tickle lives in rural Pittsylvania County, Virginia, and is shown as working in the town of Gretna.

In 2013, he was reported to be a union carpenter and to have "lived in the Washington D.C. area for two years recently as a top carpenter while building the popular Clyde's Restaurant near the Verizon Center downtown."

In 2013, Tickle was also reported to be considering running against U.S. Representative Robert Hurt in Virginia's 5th congressional district as an independent. In addition to his self-proclaimed candidacy for president in 2012, Tickle announced his intention to run for Congress and used an opportunity, in the form of an October 2013 interview with Washington Secrets to call the Affordable Care Act "crap." He said he believes in having a system in which Americans have access to healthcare, but not in allowing federal officials to opt out of it.

He was arrested for public intoxication in March 2013.

In 2015 Tickle was arrested again for the possession of a sawed-off shotgun. He was convicted on February 1, 2016. Tickle was given a three-year suspended penitentiary sentence on March 24, 2016. He was arrested again for a probation violation and sentenced to serve 5 months on September 15, 2016.

Recently, Tickle was driving on a suspended license and had a car accident. The judge decided to sentence him to jail for the remainder of his 18 months of probation yet to completed.

In 2019, Tickle married bail bondswoman Carol Ann, who he claimed had “pursued [him] for 6 years until [he] relented and went out with her,” in a moonshine-themed wedding.
