= Catholic Church in England and Wales =

- Welsh: Yr Eglwys Gatholig yng Nghymru a Lloegr; Latin: Ecclesia Catholica in Anglia et Cambria
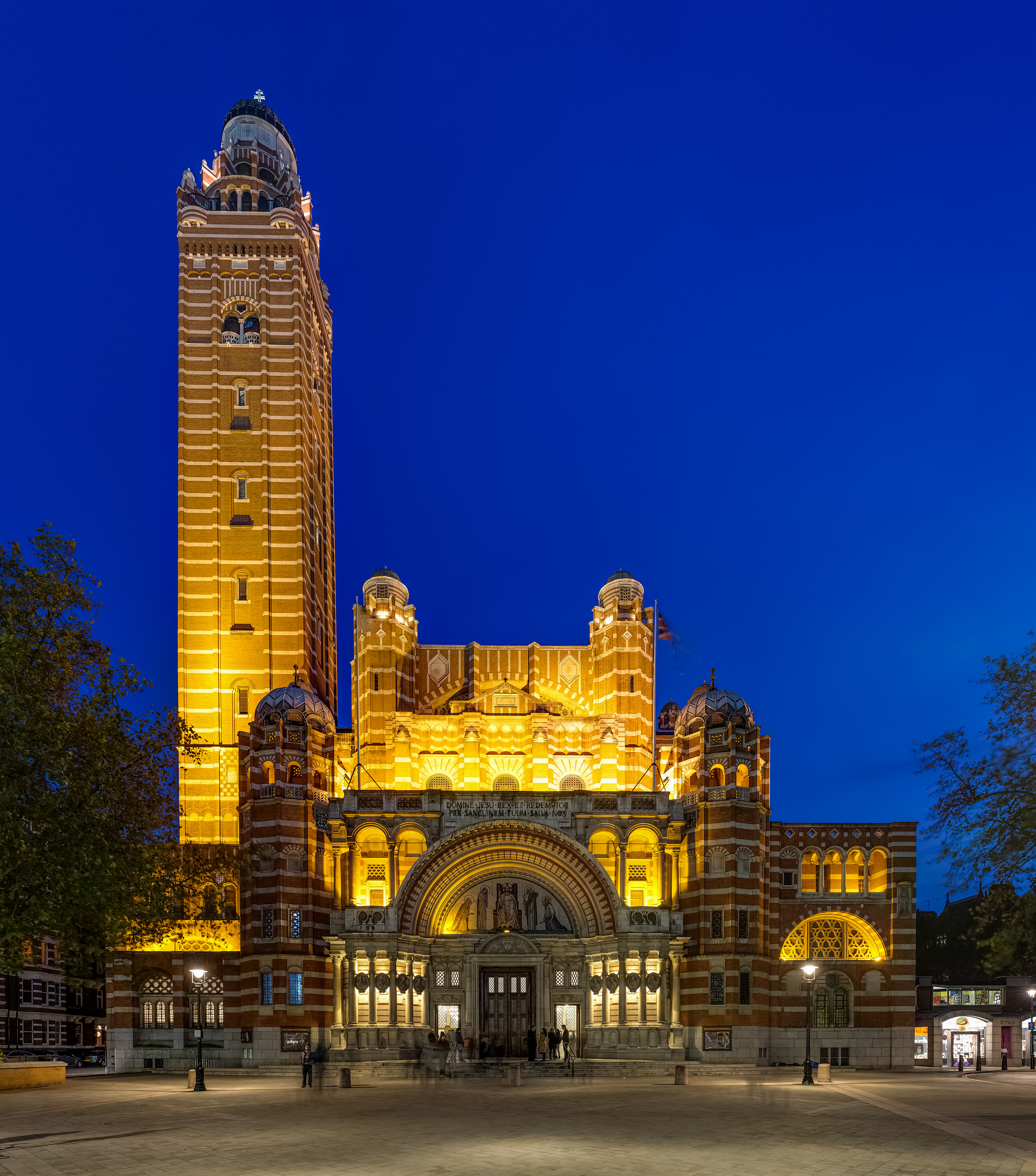
- Westminster Cathedral is the "Mother Church for Catholics in England and Wales".
- Classification: Catholic
- Orientation: Latin
- Scripture: Bible
- Theology: Catholic theology
- Governance: CBCEW
- Pope: Leo XIV
- President: Richard Moth
- Apostolic Nuncio: Miguel Maury Buendía
- Region: England and Wales
- Language: English, Welsh, Latin
- Headquarters: London, England
- Founder: Augustine of Canterbury
- Origin: c. 200s: Christianity in Roman Britain c. 500s: Anglo-Saxon Christianity; Britain, Roman Empire
- Separations: Church of England (1534/1559)
- Members: 6.2 million (~10%) (baptised, 2023)
- Official website: cbcew.org.uk

The Catholic Church in England and Wales (Latin: Ecclesia Catholica in Anglia et Cambria; Welsh: Yr Eglwys Gatholig yng Nghymru a Lloegr) is part of the worldwide Catholic Church in full communion with the Holy See. Its origins date from the 6th century, when Pope Gregory I through a Roman missionary and Benedictine monk, Augustine, intensified the evangelisation of the Kingdom of Kent, linking it to the Holy See in AD 597.

This unbroken communion with the Holy See lasted until King Henry VIII ended it in 1534. Communion with Rome was restored by Queen Mary I in 1555 following the Second Statute of Repeal and eventually finally broken by Elizabeth I's 1559 Religious Settlement, which made "no significant concessions to Catholic opinion represented by the church hierarchy and much of the nobility".

For 250 years, the government forced members of the pre-Reformation Catholic Church known as recusants to go underground for academic training in Catholic Europe, where exiled English clergy set up schools and seminaries for the sons of English recusant families. The government also placed legislative restrictions on Catholics, some continuing into the 20th century, while the ban on Catholic worship lasted until the Catholic Relief Act 1791. The ban did not, however, affect foreign embassies in London, although serving priests could be hounded. During this time, the English Catholic Church was divided between the upper classes, aristocracy and gentry, and the working class.

The Catholic Bishops' Conference of England and Wales claims 6.2 million members. That makes it the second largest single church if Christianity is divided into separate denominations. In the 2001 United Kingdom census, Catholics in England and Wales were roughly 8% of the population. One hundred years earlier, in 1901, they represented only 4.8% of the population. In 1981, 8.7% of the population of England and Wales were Catholic. In 2009, following the 2004 enlargement of the European Union, when thousands of Central Europeans (mainly heavily Catholic Poles, Lithuanians, Slovaks and Slovenes) came to England, an Ipsos Morioka poll found that 9.6% were Catholics in England and Wales. In the 2021 census, the total Christian population dropped to 46% (about 27.6 million people).

In North West England one in five are Catholic, a result of the high number of English recusants in Lancashire and large-scale Irish migration in the 19th century particularly centred in Liverpool.

== History ==
=== Roman Britons and early Christianity ===
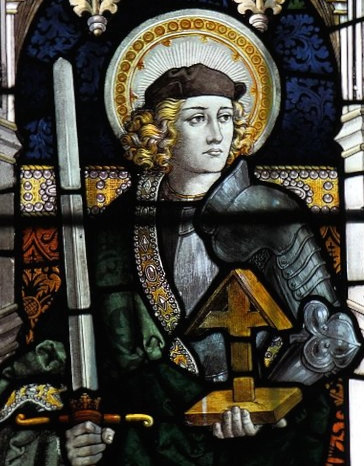
St. Alban is regarded as the protomartyr of the Roman Britons.

Much of Great Britain was incorporated into the Roman Empire during the Roman conquest of Britain, starting in AD 43, conquering lands inhabited by Celtic Britons. The indigenous religion of the Britons under their priests, the Druids, was suppressed; most notably, Gaius Suetonius Paulinus launched an attack on Anglesey (or Ynys Môn) in AD 60 and destroyed the shrine and sacred groves there. In the following years, Roman influence saw the importation of several religious cults into Britain, including Roman mythology, Mithraism and the imperial cult. One of these sects, then disapproved of by the Roman authorities, was the Judea-originated religion of Christianity. While it is unclear exactly how it arrived, the earliest British figures considered saints by Christians are St. Alban followed by SS Julius and Aaron, all in the 3rd century.

Eventually, the position of the Roman authorities on Christianity moved from hostility to toleration with the Edict of Milan in AD 313 and then enforcement as state religion following the Edict of Thessalonica in AD 380, becoming a key component of Romano-British culture and society. Records note that Romano-British bishops, such as Restitutus, attended the Council of Arles in 314, which confirmed the theological findings of an earlier convocation held in Rome (the Council of Rome) in 313. The Roman departure from Britain in the following century and the subsequent Germanic invasions sharply decreased contact between Britain and Continental Europe. Christianity, however, continued to flourish in the Brittonic areas of Great Britain. During this period, certain practices and traditions took hold in Britain and in Ireland that are collectively known as Celtic Christianity. Distinct features of Celtic Christianity include a unique monastic tonsure and calculations for the date of Easter. Regardless of these differences, historians do not consider this Celtic or British Christianity a distinct church separate from general Western European Christianity.

=== Conversion of the Anglo-Saxons ===
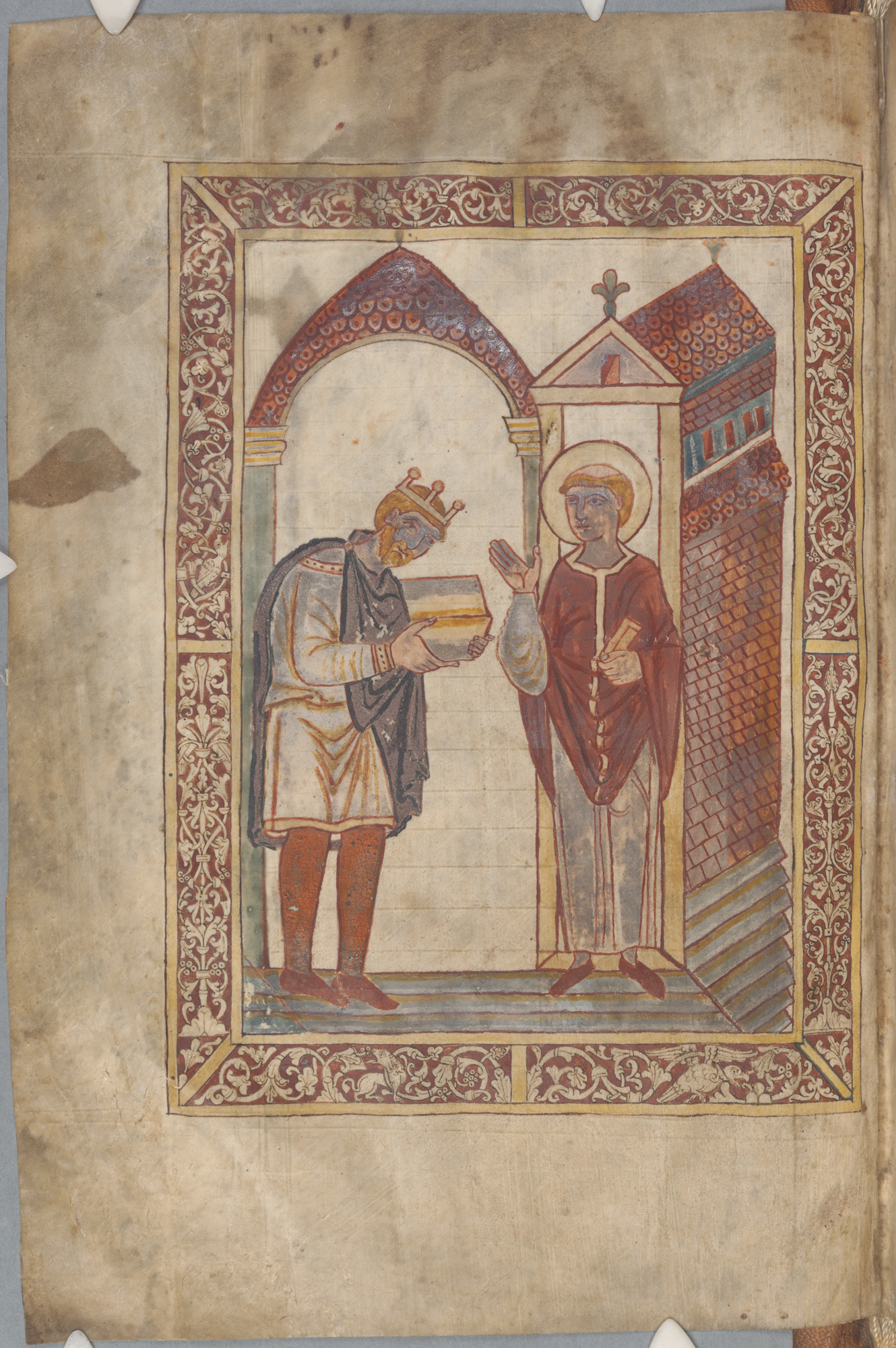
Frontispiece of Bede's Life of St Cuthbert, showing King Æthelstan

During the Heptarchy, the English people (referred to as the Anglo-Saxons) were converted to Christianity from Anglo-Saxon paganism, from two main directions:

- Iona, through its subordinate house Lindisfarne (founded by Aidan of Lindisfarne), linking the Northumbrian element of the Church (and subsequently Mercia through Chad of Mercia) to the culture of the Church in Ireland; and
- in the south, first through Kent and then spreading out to Wessex, the Gregorian mission of the late 6th century, when Pope Gregory the Great sent Augustine of Canterbury (at the time, Prior of the Abbey of St. Andrew or San Gregorio Magno al Celio) and 40 missionaries directly from Rome. This element, linked to the Continent through marriage alliances, had more of a Romano-Frankish orientation. Although the Celtic Britons (known mainly from the Middle Ages onwards as the Welsh) de facto retained their Christian religion even after the Romans pulled out, unlike the Gaels and the Romans the Welsh did not make any significant effort to evangelise the pagan Anglo-Saxons and indeed greatly resented them, as is related by Bede in his Historia ecclesiastica gentis Anglorum.

The Gregorian mission, as it is known, is of particular interest in the Catholic Church, as it was the first official Papal mission to found a church. With the help of Christians already residing in Kent, particularly Bertha, the Merovingian Frankish consort of the then pagan King Æthelberht, Augustine established an archbishopric in Canterbury, the old capital of Kent. Having received the pallium earlier (linking his new diocese to Rome), Augustine became the first in the series of Catholic archbishops of Canterbury, four of whom, (Laurence, Mellitus, Justus and Honorius), were part of the original band of Benedictine missionaries. (The last Catholic archbishop of Canterbury was Reginald Pole, who died in 1558.)

During this time of mission, Rome looked to challenge some different customs that had been retained in isolation by the Celts (the Gaels and the Britons), owing in part to their geographical distance from the rest of Western Christendom. Of particular importance was the Easter controversy (on which date to celebrate it) and the manner of monastic tonsure. Columbanus, his fellow countryman and churchman, had asked for a papal judgement on the Easter question, as did abbots and bishops of Ireland. This was particularly important in Northumbria, where the issue was causing factionalism. Later, in his Historia ecclesiastica gentis Anglorum, Bede explained the reasons for the discrepancy: "He [Columba] left successors distinguished for great charity, Divine love, and strict attention to the rules of discipline following indeed uncertain cycles in the computation of the great festival of Easter, because far away as they were out of the world, no one had supplied them with the synodal decrees relating to the Paschal observance." A series of synods were held to resolve the matter, culminating with the Synod of Whitby in 644. The missionaries also introduced the Rule of Benedict, the continental rule, to Anglo-Saxon monasteries in England. Wilfrid, a Benedictine consecrated archbishop of York (in 664), was particularly skilled in promoting the Benedictine Rule. Over time, the Benedictine continental rule became grafted upon the monasteries and parishes of England, drawing them closer to the Continent and Rome. As a result, the pope was often called upon to intervene in quarrels, affirm monarchs and decide jurisdictions. In 787, for example, Pope Adrian I elevated Lichfield to an archdiocese and appointed Hygeberht its first archbishop. In 808, Pope Leo III helped restore King Eardwulf of Northumbria to his throne, and in 859, Pope Leo IV confirmed and anointed Alfred the Great king, according to Anglo-Saxon Chronicle. Individual Benedictines seemed to play an important role throughout this period. For example, before Benedictine monk St. Dunstan was consecrated archbishop of Canterbury in 960, Pope John XII had him appointed legate, commissioning him (alongside Ethelwold and Oswald) to restore discipline in the existing monasteries of England, many of which were destroyed by Danish invaders.

=== Norman Conquest of England and part of Wales ===
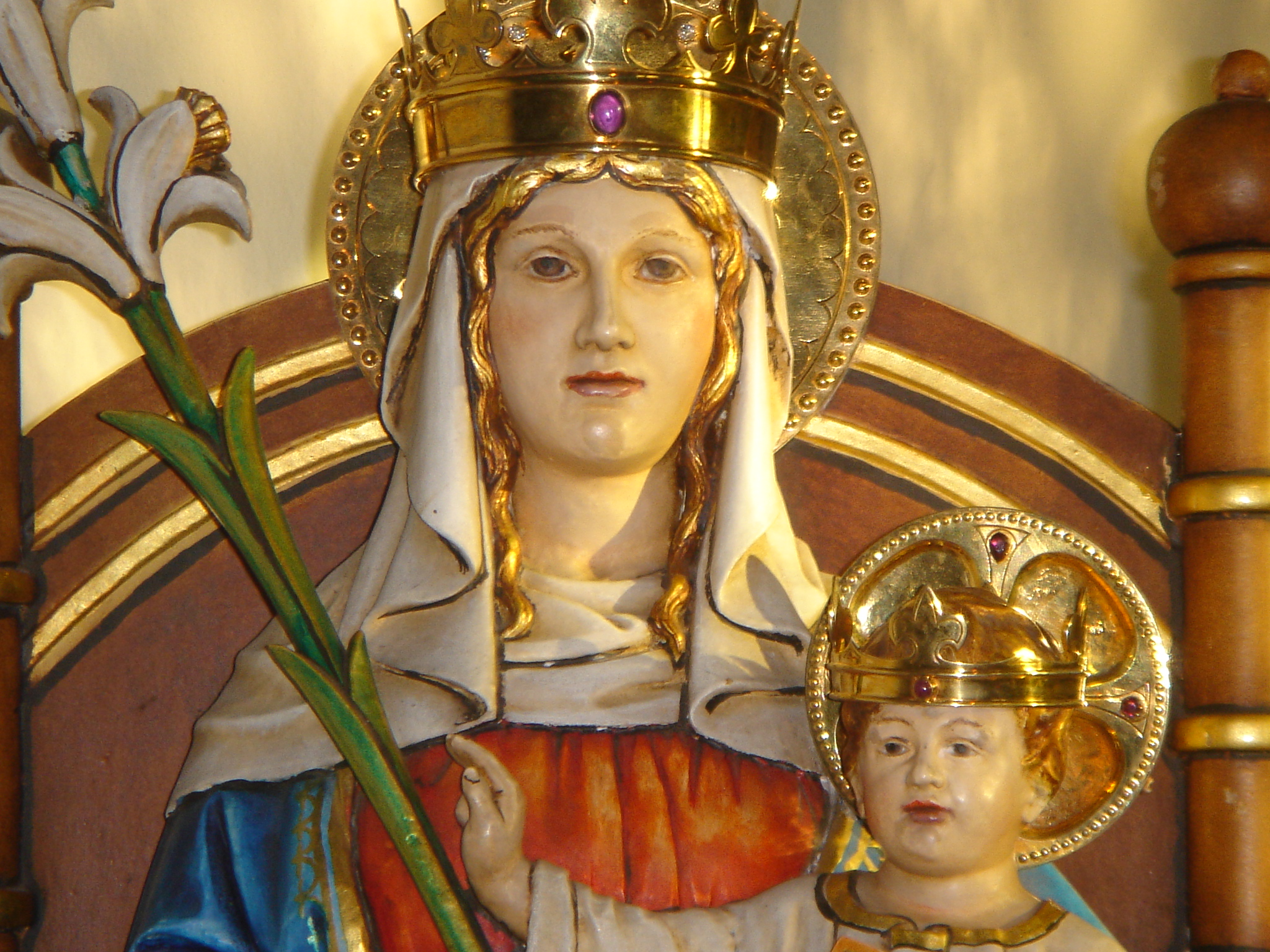
Our Lady of Walsingham

Control of the English Church passed from the Anglo-Saxons to the Normans following the Norman conquest of England. The two clerics most prominently associated with this change were the continental-born Lanfranc and Anselm, both Benedictines. Anselm later became a Doctor of the Church. A century later, Pope Innocent III had to confirm the primacy of Canterbury over four Welsh churches for many reasons, but primarily to sustain the importance of the Gregorian foundation of Augustine's mission.

During mediaeval times, England and Wales were part of western Christendom: monasteries and convents, such as those at Shaftesbury and Shrewsbury, were prominent institutions, and provided lodging, hospitals and education. Likewise, centres of education such as the University of Oxford and the University of Cambridge were important. Members of religious orders, notably the Dominicans and Franciscans, settled in both universities and maintained houses for students. Archbishop Walter de Merton founded Merton College, Oxford, and three different popes – Gregory IX, Nicholas IV and John XXII – gave Cambridge the legal protection and status to compete with other European medieval universities. Augustinians also had a significant presence at Oxford. Osney Abbey, the parent house of the college, lay on a large site to the west, near the current railway station. Another Augustinian house, St Frideswide's Priory, later became the basis for Christ Church, Oxford.

Pilgrimage was a prominent feature of mediaeval Catholicism, and England and Wales were amply provided with many popular sites of pilgrimage. The village of Walsingham in Norfolk became an important shrine after a noblewoman named Richeldis de Faverches reputedly experienced a vision of the Virgin Mary in 1061, asking her to build a replica of the Holy House at Nazareth. Some of the other holiest shrines were those at Holywell in Wales, which commemorated St Winefride, and at Westminster Abbey to Edward the Confessor. In 1170, Thomas Becket, Archbishop of Canterbury, was murdered in his cathedral by followers of King Henry II and was quickly canonised as a martyr for the faith. This resulted in Canterbury Cathedral attracting international pilgrimage and inspired the Canterbury Tales by Geoffrey Chaucer.

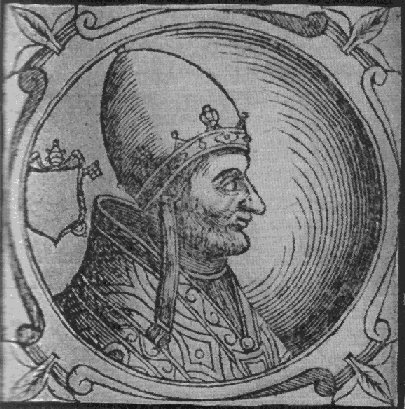
Pope Adrian IV, the only Englishman to be Pope

An Englishman, Nicholas Breakspear, became Pope Adrian IV (also known as Hadrian IV), reigning from 1154 to 1159. Fifty-six years later, Cardinal Stephen Langton, the first of English cardinals and later Archbishop of Canterbury (1208–1228), was a pivotal figure in the dispute between King John and Pope Innocent III. This critical situation led to the creation of the Magna Carta in 1215, which, among other things, insisted that the English church should be free of ecclesiastical appointments fixed by the king.

=== Tudor period and Catholic resistance ===
Banner showing the Holy Wounds of Jesus Christ which was carried by partisans during the Pilgrimage of Grace

The dynamics of the pre-Reformation bond between the Catholic Church in England and the Apostolic See remained in effect for nearly a thousand years. That is, there was no doctrinal difference between the faith of the English and the rest of Catholic Christendom, especially after calculating the date of Easter at the Council of Whitby in 667 and formalising other customs according to the See of Rome. The designation "English Church" (Ecclesia Anglicana in Latin) was made, but always in the sense of the term as indicating that it was part of one Catholic Church in communion with the Holy See and localised in England. Other regions of the church were localised in Scotland (Ecclesia Scotticana), France (Ecclesia Gallicana), Spain (Ecclesia Hispanica), etc. These regional cognomens or designations were commonly used in Rome by officials to identify a locality of the universal church but never to imply any breach with the Holy See.

When King Henry VIII "suddenly became alerted to the supposedly ancient truth" that he was truly the "Supreme Head of the Church within his dominions", he backed a series of legislative acts through the English Parliament between 1533 and 1536 that initiated an attack on papal authority and English Catholics. "The centrepiece of the new legislation was an Act of Supremacy of 1534." In some cases, those adhering to Catholicism faced capital punishment.

In 1534, during the reign of Henry VIII, the English church became independent of the Holy See for a period owing to "continued" innovations with Henry declaring himself its Supreme Head. This breach was in response to the Pope's refusal to annul Henry's marriage to Catherine of Aragon. Henry did not himself accept Protestant innovations in doctrine or liturgy. For example, the Six Articles of 1539 imposed the Death Penalty on those who denied Transubstantiation. Conversely, failure to accept his break from Rome, particularly by prominent persons in church and state, was regarded by Henry as treason, resulting in the execution of Thomas More, former Lord Chancellor, and John Fisher, Bishop of Rochester, among others. The See of Rome Act 1536 legitimised the separation from Rome, while the Pilgrimage of Grace of 1536 and Bigod's Rebellion of 1537, risings in the North against the religious changes, were bloodily repressed.

Throughout 1536–1541, Henry VIII engaged in a large-scale dissolution of the Monasteries in order to gain control of most of the wealth of the church and much of the richest land. He disbanded monasteries, priories, convents and friaries in England, Wales and Ireland, appropriated their income, disposed of their assets, sold off artefacts stolen from them, and provided pensions for the robbed monks and former residents. He did not turn these properties over to his local Church of England. Instead, they were sold, mostly to pay for the wars. The historian G. W. Bernard argues that the dissolution of the monasteries in the late 1530s was one of the most revolutionary events in English history. There were nearly 900 religious houses in England, around 260 for monks, 300 for regular canons, 142 nunneries and 183 friaries; some 12,000 people in total, 4,000 monks, 3,000 canons, 3,000 friars and 2,000 nuns. One adult man in fifty was in religious orders in a country of two and one half million. In the Catholic narrative, Henry's action was sacrilegious, a national violation of things consecrated to God, and evil. The fate of the English Carthusians was one of the worst of the period. Thomas Cromwell had them "savagely punished" with their leaders "hanged and disembowelled at Tyburn in May 1535, still wearing their monastic habits." Even today, Henry's act is still considered controversial. Anglicans such as Giles Fraser have noted that the property "was stolen" from the Catholic Church and that "this theft of land is the really dirty stuff – the original sin of the Church of England". Nevertheless, Henry maintained a strong preference for traditional Catholic practices and, during his reign, Protestant reformers were unable to make more radical changes to the practices and the "continued innovation" of his own "personally devised religious 'middle way'". Indeed, Henry "cruelly emphasized his commitment" to his innovations "by executing three papal loyalists and burning three evangelicals"

The 1547 to 1553 reign of the boy King Edward VI saw the Church of England become more influenced by Protestantism in its doctrine and worship. In 1550, John Laski, a Polish ex-Catholic cleric and nephew of the Polish primate, whose Catholic career came "to an abrupt end in 1540 when he married", and who later become a Calvinist, arrived in London and became superintendent of the Strangers' Church of London. He, among other Protestants, became an associate of Thomas Cranmer and of John Hooper. He had some influence on ecclesiastical affairs during the reign of Edward VI. For instance, the Tridentine Mass was replaced by the (English) Book of Common Prayer, representational art and statues in church buildings destroyed, and Catholic practices that had survived during Henry's reign, such as public prayers to the Virgin Mary – for example, the Salve Regina – ended. In 1549, the Western Rising in Cornwall and Devon broke out to protest the abolition of the Mass – the rebels called the 1549 Holy Communion Service, "commonly called the Mass", a Christian game. The rebellion – resistance to Protestantism – was put down ruthlessly.

==== Reign of Mary I ====
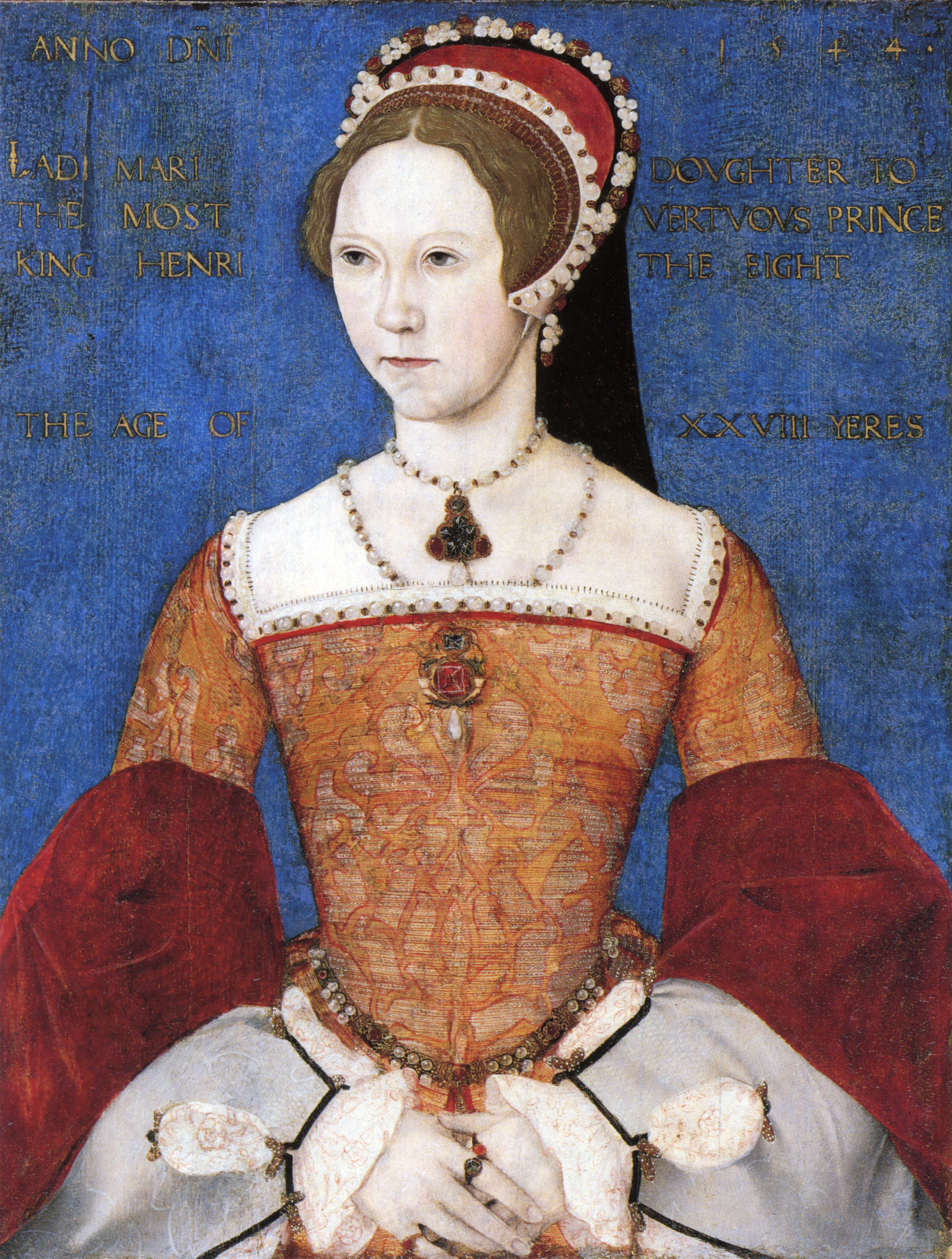
Queen Mary I by Master John

Under Queen Mary I, in 1553, the fractured and discordant English Church was linked again to continental Catholicism and the See of Rome through the doctrinal and liturgical initiatives of Reginald Pole and other Catholic reformers. Mary was determined to return the whole of England to the Catholic faith. This aim was not necessarily at odds with the feeling of a large section of the populace; Edward's Protestant reformation had not been well received everywhere, and there was ambiguity in the responses of the parishes.

Mary also had some powerful families behind her. The Jerningham family, with other East Anglian Catholic families such as the Bedingfelds, Waldegraves, Rochesters and the Huddlestons of Sawston Hall, were "the key to Queen Mary's successful accession to the throne. Without them she would never have made it". However, Mary's execution of 300 Protestants by burning them at the stake proved counterproductive, as this measure was extremely unpopular with the populace. For example, instead of executing Archbishop Cranmer for treason for supporting Queen Jane, she had him tried for heresy and burned at the stake. Foxe's Book of Martyrs, which glorified the Protestants killed at the time and vilified Catholics, ensured her a place in popular memory as Bloody Mary, though some recent historians have noted that most of the Protestants that Foxe highlights in his book, who were tried for heresy, were primarily Anabaptists, which explains why mainstream Protestants such as Stephen Gardiner and William Paget (who were members of Philip's "consejo codigo") went along with it. These historians also note that it was Bartolome Carranza, an influential Spanish Dominican of Philip II's workforce, who insisted that Thomas Cranmer's sentence be put into effect. "It was Carranza, not Mary, who insisted that the sentence against Cranmer be carried out."

For centuries after, the idea of another reconciliation with Rome was linked in many English people's minds with a renewal of Mary's fiery stakes. Ultimately, her alleged harshness was a success but at the cost of alienating a fairly large section of English society that had been moving away from some traditional Catholic devotional practices. These English were neither Calvinist nor Lutheran, but certainly leaning towards Protestant Reformation (and, by the late sixteenth century, were certainly Protestant).

==== Reign of Elizabeth I ====
When Mary died and Elizabeth I became queen in 1558, the religious situation in England was confused. Throughout the alternating religious landscape of the reigns of Henry VIII, Edward VI, and Mary I, a significant proportion of the population, especially in the rural and outlying areas of the country, were likely to have continued to hold Catholic views, or were conservative. Nevertheless, Elizabeth was a Protestant and the "very rituals with which the parish had celebrated her accession would be swept away". Thus, Elizabeth's first act was to reverse her sister's re-establishment of Catholicism by Acts of Supremacy and Uniformity. The Act of Supremacy 1558 made it a crime to assert the authority of any foreign prince, prelate or other authority, and was aimed at abolishing the authority in England of the Pope. A third offence of high treason became punishable by death. The Oath of Supremacy, imposed by the Act of Supremacy 1558, provided for any person taking public or church office in England to swear allegiance to the monarch as Supreme Governor of the Church of England. Failure to so swear was a crime, although it did not become treason until 1562, when the Supremacy of the Crown Act 1562 made a second offence of refusing to take the oath treason.

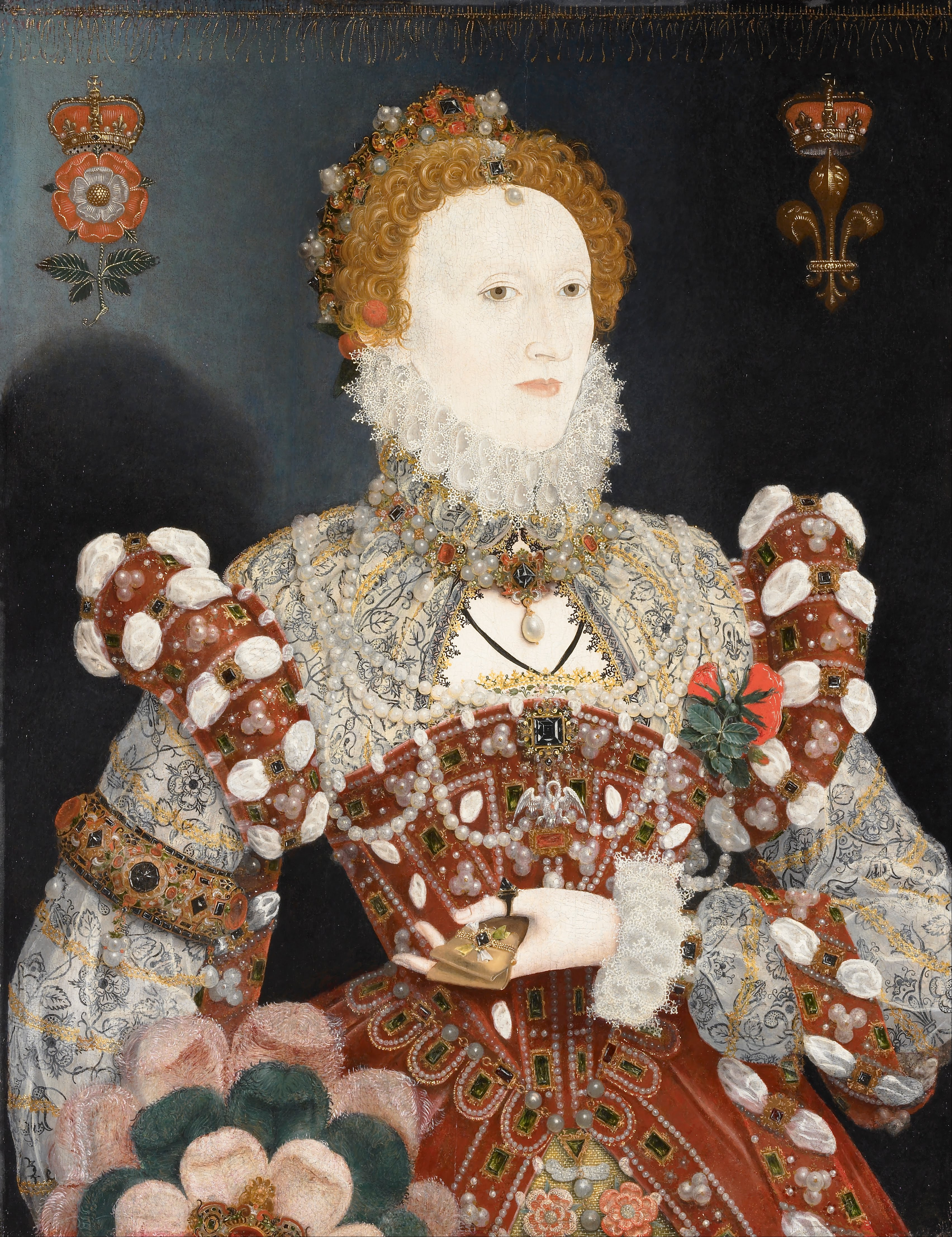
Queen Elizabeth I by Nicholas Hilliard (called) -

During the first years of her reign from 1558 to 1570, there was relative leniency towards Catholics who were willing to keep their religion private, especially if they were prepared to continue to attend their parish churches. The wording of the official prayer book had been carefully designed to make this possible by omitting aggressively "heretical" matter, and, at first, many English Catholics did, in fact, worship with their Protestant neighbours, at least until this was formally forbidden by Pope Pius V's 1570 bull, Regnans in Excelsis, which also declared that Elizabeth was not a rightful queen and should be overthrown. It formally excommunicated her and any who obeyed her, and obliged all Catholics to attempt to overthrow her.

In response, the "Act to retain the Queen's Majesty's subjects in their obedience", passed in 1581, made it high treason to reconcile anyone or to be reconciled to "the Romish religion", or to procure or publish any papal bull or writing whatsoever. The celebration of Mass was prohibited under penalty of a fine of two hundred marks and imprisonment for one year for the celebrant, and a fine of one hundred marks and the same imprisonment for those who heard the Mass. This act also increased the penalty for not attending the Anglican service to the sum of twenty pounds a month, or imprisonment until the fine was paid or until the offender went to the Protestant Church. A further penalty of ten pounds a month was inflicted on anyone keeping a schoolmaster who did not attend the Protestant service. The schoolmaster himself was to be imprisoned for one year.

England's wars with Catholic powers such as France and Spain culminated in the attempted invasion by the Spanish Armada in 1588. The Papal bull had unleashed nationalistic feelings that equated Protestantism with loyalty to a highly popular monarch and made Catholics "vulnerable to accusations of being traitors to the crown". The Rising of the North, the Throckmorton Plot and the Babington Plot, alongside other subversive activities of supporters of Mary, Queen of Scots, all reinforced the association of Catholicism with treachery in the minds of many, notably in middle and southern England.

The climax of Elizabeth's anti-Catholic legislation was in 1585, two years before the execution of Mary, Queen of Scots, with the Act against Jesuits, Seminary priests and other such like disobedient persons. This statute, under which most of the English Catholic martyrs were executed, made it high treason for any Jesuit or any seminary priest to be in England at all, and a felony for any one to harbour or relieve them.

The last of Elizabeth's anti-Catholic laws was the Act for the Better Discovery of Wicked and Seditious Persons Terming Themselves Catholics, but Being Rebellious and Traitorous Subjects. Its effect was to prohibit all recusants from going more than five miles from their place of abode, and to order all persons suspected of being Jesuits or seminary priests, and not answering satisfactorily, to be imprisoned until they did so.

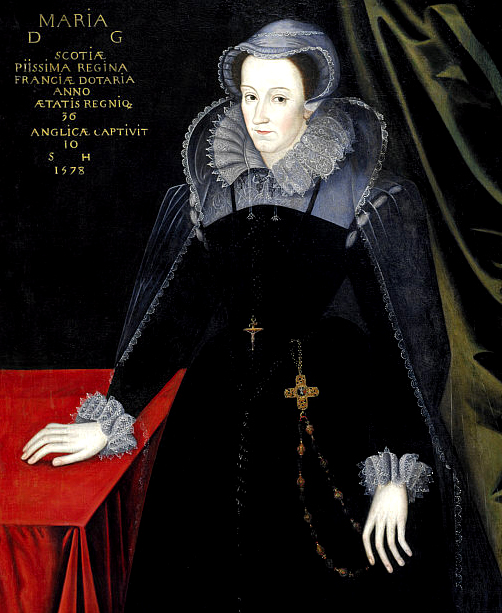
Mary, Queen of Scots by Nicholas Hilliard 1578

However, Elizabeth did not believe that her anti-Catholic policies constituted religious persecution, though "she strangled, disembowelled, and dismembered more than 200" English Catholics and "built on the actions of Mary". In the context of the uncompromising wording of the Papal bull against her, she failed to distinguish between those Catholics in conflict with her from those with no such designs. The number of English Catholics executed under Elizabeth was significant, including Edmund Campion, Robert Southwell and Margaret Clitherow. Elizabeth herself signed the regicidal death warrant of her cousin, Mary, Queen of Scots, after 19 years as Elizabeth's prisoner. As MacCulloch has noted, "England judicially murdered more Roman Catholics than any other country in Europe, which puts English pride in national tolerance in an interesting perspective". So distraught was Elizabeth over Catholic opposition to her throne, she was secretly in touch with the Ottoman Sultan Murad III, "asking for military aid against Philip of Spain and the 'idolatrous princes' supporting him".

Because of the persecution in England, Catholic priests were trained abroad at the English College, Rome, the English College, Douai, the English College, Valladolid, and the English College, Seville. Given that Douai was located in the Spanish Netherlands, part of the dominions of Elizabethan England's greatest enemy, and Valladolid and Seville in Spain itself, they became associated in the public eye with political as well as religious subversion. It was this combination of nationalistic public opinion, sustained persecution and the rise of a new generation, which could not remember pre-Reformation times and had no pre-established loyalty to Catholicism, that reduced the number of Catholics in England during this period – although the overshadowing memory of Queen Mary I's reign was another factor that should not be underestimated (the population of the country was 4.1 million). Nevertheless, by the end of Elizabeth's reign, probably 20% of the population were still Catholic, with 10% dissident "Puritan" Protestants and the remainder more or less reconciled to the Anglican church as "parish Anglicans". By then, most English people had largely been de-catholicised but were not Protestant. Religious "uniformity", however, "was a lost cause", given the presence of Dissenting, Nonconformist Protestants, and Catholic minorities.

During Elizabeth's reign, Dorothy Lawson was a Catholic noblewoman who used her autonomy, financial independence and social status as a widow to harbour priests in her household. Another notable Elizabethan Catholic, possibly a convert, was composer William Byrd.

=== Stuart period ===
The reign of James I (1603–1625) was marked by a measure of tolerance, though less so after the discovery of the Gunpowder Plot conspiracy of a small group of Catholic conspirators who aimed to kill both King and Parliament, and establish a Catholic monarchy. A mix of persecution and tolerance followed: Ben Jonson and his wife, for example, in 1606, were summoned before the authorities for failure to take communion in the Church of England, yet the King tolerated some Catholics at court; for example, George Calvert, to whom he gave the title Baron Baltimore (his son, Cecil Calvert, 2nd Baron Baltimore, founded, in 1632, the Province of Maryland as a refuge for persecuted Catholics), and the Duke of Norfolk, head of the Howard family.

The reign of Charles I (1625–1649) saw a small revival of Catholicism in England, especially among the upper classes. As part of the royal marriage settlement, Charles's Catholic wife, Henrietta Maria, was permitted her own royal chapel and chaplain. Henrietta Maria was, in fact, very strict in her religious observances, and helped create a court with continental influences, where Catholicism was the official religion of many countries, and tolerated, if not somewhat fashionable, in others. Some anti-Catholic legislation became, in effect, a dead letter. The Counter-Reformation on the continent had created a more vigorous and magnificent form of Catholicism (that is, Baroque, notably found in the architecture and music of Austria, Italy and Germany) that attracted some converts, such as the poet Richard Crashaw. Ironically, this explicitly Catholic artistic movement ended up "providing the blueprint, after the fire of London, for the first new Protestant churches to be built in England".

While Charles remained firmly Protestant, he was personally drawn towards a consciously "High Church" Anglicanism. This affected his appointments to Anglican bishoprics, in particular that of William Laud as Archbishop of Canterbury. How many Catholics and Puritans there were is still open to debate.

Religious conflict between Charles and other "High" Anglicans and Calvinists – at this stage mostly still within the Church of England (the Puritans) – formed a strand of the anti-monarchical leanings of the troubled politics of the period. The religious tensions between a court with "Papist" elements and a Parliament in which the Puritans were strong was one of the major factors behind the English Civil War, in which almost all Catholics supported the King. The victory of the Parliamentarians meant a strongly Protestant, anti-Catholic regime, content for the English Church to become "little more than a nationwide federation of Protestant parishes".

The restoration of the monarchy under Charles II (1660–1685) also saw the restoration of a Catholic-influenced court like his father's. However, although Charles himself had Catholic leanings, he was first and foremost a pragmatist and realised the vast majority of public opinion in England was strongly anti-Catholic, and so he agreed to laws such as the Test Act, requiring any appointee to any public office or member of Parliament to deny Catholic beliefs such as transubstantiation. As far as possible, however, he maintained tacit tolerance. Like his father, he married a Catholic, Catherine of Braganza. (He would become Catholic himself on his deathbed.)

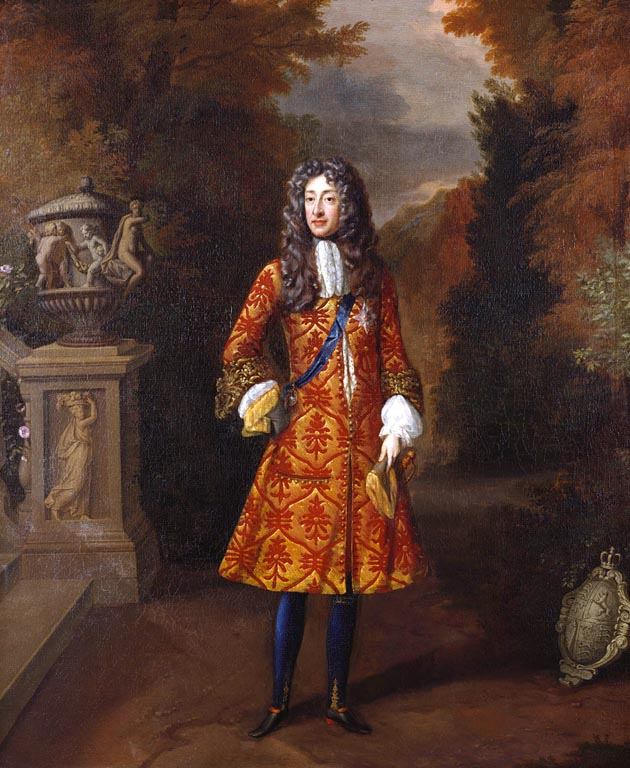
James II was the last Catholic to reign as monarch of England (and Scotland and Ireland).

Charles's brother and heir, James, Duke of York (later James II), converted to Catholicism in 1668–1669. When Titus Oates in 1678 alleged a (totally imaginary) "Popish Plot" to assassinate Charles and put James in his place, he unleashed a wave of parliamentary and public hysteria that led to the execution of 17 Catholics on the scaffold, and the deaths of many more over the next two years, which Charles was either unable or unwilling to prevent. Throughout the early 1680s, the Whig element in Parliament attempted to remove James as successor to the throne. Their failure saw James become, in 1685, Britain's first openly Catholic monarch since Mary I (and last to date). He promised religious toleration for Catholic and Protestants on an equal footing, but it is in doubt whether he did this to gain support from Dissenters or whether he was truly committed to tolerance (seventeenth-century Catholic regimes in Spain and Italy, for example, were hardly tolerant of Protestantism, while those in France and Poland had practised forms of toleration).

James earnestly tried "to improve the position of his fellow Catholics" and did so "in such an inept way that he aroused the fears of both the Anglican establishment and the Dissenters. In the process, he encouraged converts like the poet John Dryden, who wrote "The Hind and the Panther", to celebrate his conversion. Protestant fears mounted as James placed Catholics in the major commands of the existing standing army, dismissed the Protestant Bishop of London and dismissed the Protestant fellows of Magdalen College and replaced them with a wholly Catholic board. The last straw was the birth of a Catholic heir in 1688, portending a return to a pre-Reformation Catholic dynasty. Observing this was Princess Mary, James' daughter by his first wife, and her husband "'Stadhouder Willem,' whose wife stood to lose her future thrones through this new arrival".

=== William and Mary and the Catholic Church ===
In what came to be known as the Glorious Revolution, Parliament deemed James to have abdicated (in effect deposing him, though Parliament refused to call it that) in favour of his Protestant daughter, Mary II, and son-in-law and nephew, William III. Although this affair is celebrated as solidifying both English liberties and the Protestant nature of the kingdom, some argue that it was "fundamentally a coup spearheaded by a foreign army and navy".

James fled into exile, and with him many Catholic nobility and gentry. The Act of Settlement 1701, which remains in operation today, established the royal line through Sophia, Electress of Hanover, and specifically excludes any Catholic or anyone who marries a Catholic from the throne. In 2013, this law was partially changed, when the disqualification of the monarch marrying a Catholic was eliminated (alongside male preference in the line of succession). The law was also changed to limit the requirement that the monarch "must give permission to marry to the six persons next in line to the throne". Still, Catholics today once again are permitted to hold Wolsey and More's office of Lord Chancellor as did Catholics before the Reformation. Henry Benedict Cardinal Stuart, the last Jacobite heir publicly to assert a claim to the thrones of England, Scotland, and Ireland, died in Rome in 1807. A monument to the Royal Stuarts exists today at Vatican City. In the 21st century, Franz, Duke of Bavaria, head of the Wittelsbach family, is the most senior descendant of King Charles I, and is considered by Jacobites to be heir of the Stuarts. Though a direct descendant of the House of Stuart, Franz has said being king is not a claim he wishes to pursue.

=== Recusants and moves towards Emancipation ===
Geographical distribution of English Catholic Recusancy, 1715–1720

The years from 1688 to the early 19th century were in some respects the lowest point for Catholicism in England.

Deprived of their dioceses, four apostolic vicariates were set up throughout England until the re-establishment of the diocesan episcopacy in 1850. Although the persecution was not violent as it had been previously, Catholic numbers, influence and visibility in English society reached their lowest point. The percentage of the population that was Catholic may have declined from 4% in 1700 (out of a population of 5.2 million) to 1% in 1800 (out of a population of 7.25 million) with absolute numbers halved. By 1825, however, the Bishop of Chester estimated that there were "about a half a million Catholics in England". Their civil rights were severely curtailed: their right to own property or inherit land was greatly limited; they were burdened with special taxes; they could not send their children abroad for Catholic education; they could not vote; and priests were liable to imprisonment. Writing about the Catholic Church during this time, historian Antonia Fraser notes:

The harsh laws and the live-and-let-live reality were two very different things. This world was divided into the upper classes, the aristocracy and the gentry, and what were literally the working classes. Undoubtedly, the survival of Catholicism in the past [up until 1829] was due to the dogged, but hopefully inconspicuous, protection provided by the former to the latter. Country neighbours, Anglicans and Catholics, lived amicably together in keeping with this "laissez-faire" reality.

There was no longer, as once in Stuart times, any notable Catholic presence at court, in public life, in the military and in the professions. Many of the Catholic nobles and gentry, who had preserved on their lands among their tenants small pockets of Catholicism, had followed James into exile, and others, at least outwardly in cryptic fashion, conformed to Anglicanism, meaning fewer such Catholic communities survived intact. For "obvious reasons", Catholic aristocracy at this time was heavily intermarried. Their great houses, however, still had chapels called "libraries", with priests attached to these places (shelved for books) who celebrated Mass, which worship was described in public as "Prayers". Interestingly, one area where the sons of working-class Catholics could find religious tolerance was in the army. Generals, for example, did not deny Catholic men their Mass and did not compel them to attend Anglican services, believing that "physical strength and devotion to the military struggle was demanded of them, not spiritual allegiance". Fraser also notes that the role of the working class among themselves was important:

...servants of various degrees and farm workers, miners, mill workers and tradesmen, responded with loyalty, hard work and gratitude for the opportunity to practice the faith of their fathers (and even more importantly, in many cases, their mothers). Their contributions should not be ignored, even if it is for obvious reasons more difficult to uncover than that of their theoretical superiors. The unspoken survival of the Catholic community in England, despite Penal laws, depended also on these loyal families unknown to history whose existence is recorded as Catholics in Anglican parish registers. That of Walton-le-Dale parish church, near Preston in Lancashire in 1781, for example, records 178 families, with 875 individuals as 'Papists'. Where baptisms are concerned, parental occupations are stated as weaver, husbandman and labourer, with names such as Turner, Wilcock, Balwin and Charnley.

A bishop at this time (roughly from 1688 to 1850) was called a vicar apostolic. The officeholder was a titular bishop (as opposed to a diocesan bishop) through whom the pope exercised jurisdiction over a particular church territory in England. English-speaking colonial America came under the jurisdiction of the Vicar Apostolic of the London District. As titular bishop over Catholics in British America, he was important to the government not only in regard to its English-speaking North American colonies, but also made more so after the Seven Years' War when the British Empire, in 1763, acquired the French-speaking (and predominantly Catholic) territory of Canada. Only after the Treaty of Paris in 1783, and in 1789 with the consecration of John Carroll, a friend of Benjamin Franklin, did the United States of America have its own diocesan bishop, free of the Vicar Apostolic of London, James Robert Talbot.

The introduction of vicars apostolic or titular bishops in 1685 was very important at the time and ought not be misprized. For example, when John Leyburn, formerly of the English College, Douai, was appointed Vicar Apostolic of England, it was the first time a Catholic bishop had been present in England for nearly sixty years. Until that time, archpriests were overseeing the church.

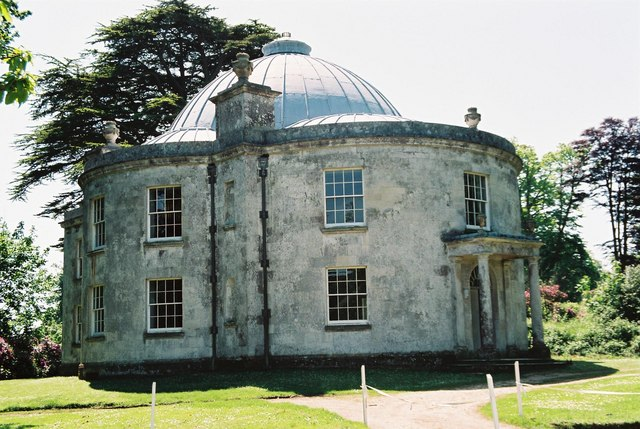
The first Catholic church since the Reformation, built in 1786 by Thomas Weld to look like a house at Lulworth Castle, East Lulworth, Dorset

In Leyburn's combined tour north and visitation to administer Confirmation, in 1687, some 20,859 Catholics received the sacrament. Most Catholics, it could be said, retreated to relative isolation from a popular Protestant mainstream, and Catholicism in England in this period was politically invisible to history. However, culturally and socially, there were notable exceptions. Alexander Pope, owing to his literary popularity, was one memorable English Catholic of the 18th century. Other prominent Catholics were three remarkable members of the Catholic gentry: Baron Petre, who wined and dined George III and Queen Charlotte at Thorndon Hall; Thomas Weld, the bibliophile and friend of George III, who, in 1794, donated his Stonyhurst estate to the Jesuits to establish a college, alongside 30 acres of land; and the Duke of Norfolk, the Premier Duke in the peerage of England and, as Earl of Arundel, the Premier Earl. In virtue of his status and as head of the Howard family, which included some Church of England, though many Catholic, members, the Duke was always at Court. It seemed as if the values and worth of aristocracy "trumped those of the illegal religion". Pope, however, seemed to benefit from the isolation. In 1713, when he was 25, he took subscriptions for a project that filled his life for the next seven years, the result being a new version of Homer's Iliad. Samuel Johnson pronounced it the greatest translation ever achieved in the English language. Over time, Pope became the greatest poet of the age, the Augustan Age, especially for his mock-heroic poems, The Rape of the Lock and The Dunciad.

Around this time, in 1720, Clement XI proclaimed Anselm of Canterbury a Doctor of the Church. In 1752, Great Britain adopted the Gregorian calendar decreed by Pope Gregory XIII in 1582. Later in the century, there was some liberalisation of the anti-Catholic laws on the basis of Enlightenment ideals.

In 1778, the Catholic Relief Act allowed Catholics to own property, inherit land and join the army, provided that they swore an oath of allegiance. Hardline Protestant mobs reacted in the Gordon Riots in 1780, attacking any building in London that was associated with Catholicism or owned by Catholics. The Catholic Relief Act 1791 provided further freedoms on condition of swearing an additional oath of acceptance of the Protestant succession in the Kingdom of Great Britain. This allowed Catholic schooling and clergy to operate openly, and, thus, allowed permanent missions to be set up in the larger towns. Stonyhurst College, for example, was able to be established in 1794, as the successor establishment for the fleeing English Jesuits, previously at the Colleges of St Omer, Bruges and Liège, owing to a timely and generous donation by a former pupil, Thomas Weld (of Lulworth), as Europe became engulfed in war. This act was followed in Ireland with the Roman Catholic Relief Act 1793, an Act of the Irish Parliament with some local provisions such as allowing Catholics to vote in elections to the Irish House of Commons and to take degrees at Trinity College Dublin.

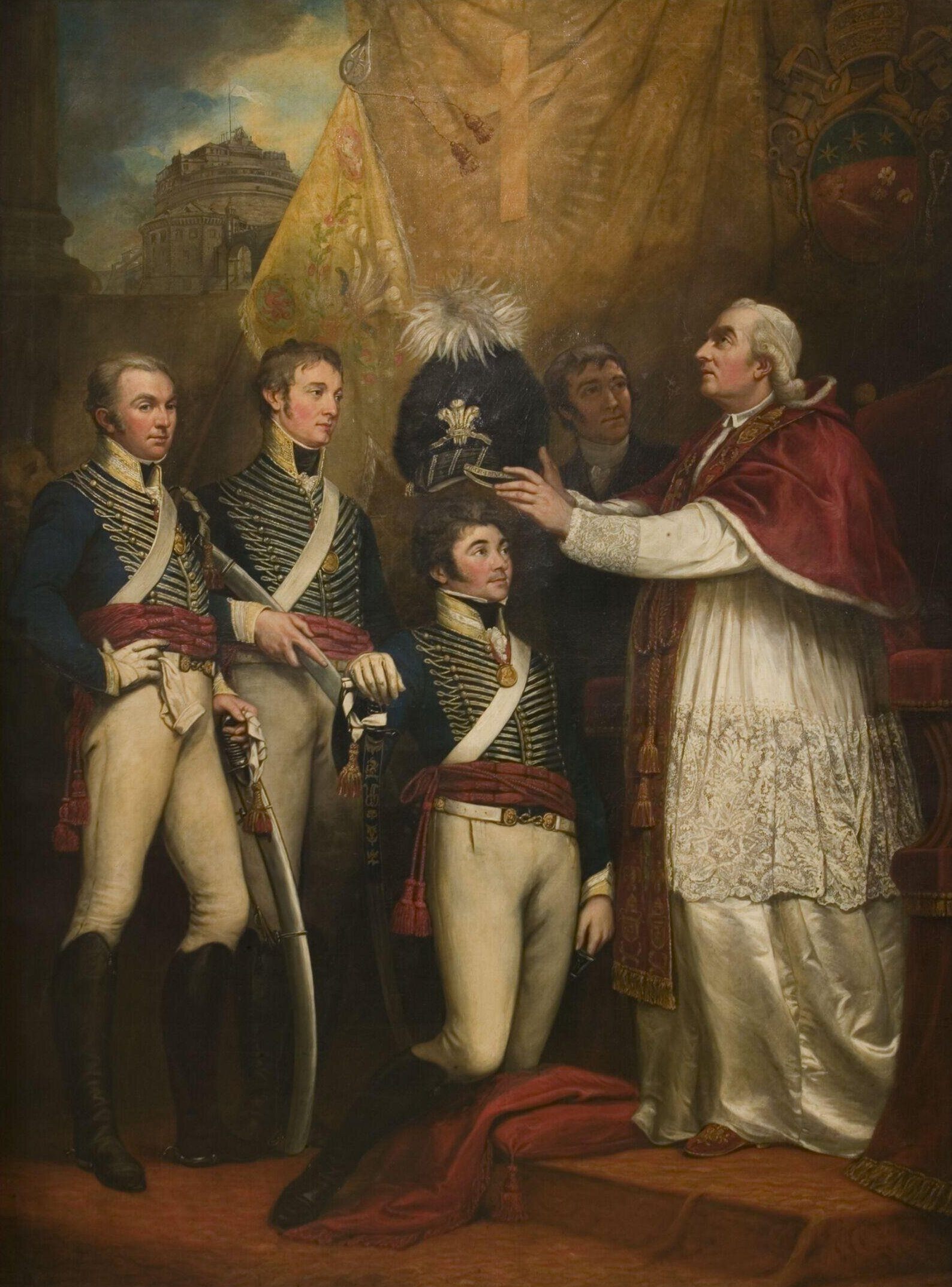
The Presentation of British Officers to Pope Pius VI, 1794 by James Northcote. British troops served in Italy during the French Revolutionary Wars

In 1837, James Arundell, 10th Baron Arundell of Wardour, bequeathed to Stonyhurst the Arundel Library, which contained the vast Arundel family collection, including some of the school's most important books and manuscripts such as a Shakespeare First Folio and a manuscript copy of Froissart's Chronicles, looted from the body of a dead Frenchman after the Battle of Agincourt. However, Catholic recusants, as a whole, remained a small group, except where they stayed the majority religion in various pockets, notably in rural Lancashire and Cumbria, or were part of the Catholic aristocracy and squirearchy. Finally, the famous recusant Maria Fitzherbert, who during this period secretly married the Prince of Wales, prince regent and future George IV in 1785. The British Constitution, however, did not accept it, and George IV later moved on. Cast aside by the establishment, she was adopted by the town of Brighton, whose citizens, both Catholic and Protestant, called her "Mrs. Prince". According to journalist Richard Abbott, "Before the town had a [Catholic] church of its own, she had a priest say Mass at her own house, and invited local Catholics", suggesting the recusants of Brighton were not very undiscovered.

In a 2009 study of the English Catholic community in 1688–1745, Gabriel Glickman notes that Catholics, especially those whose social position gave them access to the courtly centres of power and patronage, had a significant part to play in 18th-century England. They were not as marginal as one might think today. For example, Alexander Pope was not the only Catholic whose contributions (especially, Essays on Man) helped define the temper of an early English Enlightenment. In addition to Pope, Glickman notes a Catholic architect, James Gibbs, who built the Radcliffe Camera and returned baroque forms to the London skyline, and a Catholic composer, Thomas Arne, who composed "Rule, Britannia!". According to reviewer Aidan Bellenger, Glickman also suggests that "rather than being the victims of the Stuart failure, 'the unpromising setting of exile and defeat' had 'sown the seed of a frail but resilient English Catholic Enlightenment'". University of Chicago historian Steven Pincus likewise argues in his book 1688: The First Modern Revolution that Catholics under William and Mary, and their successors, experienced considerable freedom.

=== Nineteenth century and Irish immigration ===
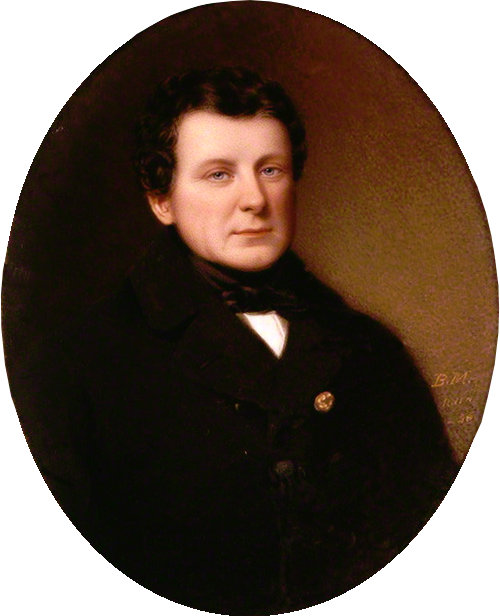
Irish statesman, Daniel O'Connell, influenced the passage of the Roman Catholic Relief Act 1829

After this moribund period, the first signs of a revival occurred as thousands of French Catholics fled France during the French Revolution. The leaders of the Revolution were virulently anti-Catholic, even singling out priests and nuns for summary execution or massacre, and England was seen as a haven from Jacobin violence. In 1801, a new political entity was formed, the United Kingdom of Great Britain and Ireland, which merged the Kingdom of Great Britain with the Kingdom of Ireland, thus increasing the number of Catholics in the new state. Pressure for abolition of anti-Catholic laws grew, particularly with the need for Catholic recruits to fight in the Napoleonic Wars.

Despite the resolute opposition of George IV, which delayed fundamental reform, 1829 brought a major step in the liberalisation of most anti-Catholic laws, although some aspects were to remain on the statute book into the 21st century. Parliament passed the Roman Catholic Relief Act 1829, giving Catholic men almost equal civil rights, including the right to hold most public offices. If Catholics were rich, however, exceptions were always made, even before the changes. For example, American ministers to the Court of St. James's were often struck by the prominence of wealthy American-born Catholics, titled ladies among the nobility, such as Louisa (Caton), granddaughter of Charles Carroll of Carrollton, and her two sisters, Mary Ann and Elizabeth. After Louisa's first husband, Sir Felton Bathurst-Hervey, died, Louisa married Francis D'Arcy-Osborne, 7th Duke of Leeds (then Marquess of Carmarthen as heir of the 6th Duke of Leeds), and had the Duke of Wellington as her European protector. Her sister Mary Ann married Richard Wellesley, 1st Marquess Wellesley, the brother of the Duke of Wellington and then the Lord Lieutenant of Ireland; her other sister, Elizabeth (Lady Stafford), married another British nobleman. Although British law required, until 1837, an Anglican marriage service (after the Clandestine Marriages Act 1753), each of the sisters and their Protestant spouses had a Catholic ceremony afterwards. At Louisa's first wedding, the Duke of Wellington escorted the bride.

In the 1840s and 1850s, especially during the Great Irish Famine, while much of the large outflow of migration from Ireland was heading to the United States to seek work, hundreds of thousands of Irish people also migrated across the channel to England and Scotland, and established communities in cities there, including London, Liverpool, Manchester and Glasgow, but also in towns and villages up and down the country, thus giving Catholicism in England a numerical boost.

=== Re-establishment of dioceses ===
At various points after the 16th century hopes had been entertained by many English Catholics that the "reconversion of England" was at hand. Additionally, with the arrival of Irish Catholic migrants (Ireland was part of the UK until the partition, in 1922), some considered that a "second spring" of Catholicism across Britain was developing. Rome responded by re-establishing the Catholic hierarchy in 1850, creating 12 Catholic dioceses in England from existing apostolic vicariates and appointing diocesan bishops (to replace earlier titular bishops) with fixed sees on a more traditional Catholic pattern. The Catholic Church in England and Wales had had 22 dioceses immediately before the Reformation, but none of the current 22 bear close resemblance (geographically) to the 22 earlier pre-Reformation dioceses.

The re-established Catholic episcopacy specifically avoided using places that were sees of the Church of England, in effect temporarily abandoning the titles of Catholic dioceses before Elizabeth I because of the Ecclesiastical Titles Act 1851, which in England favoured a state church (i.e., Church of England) and denied arms and legal existence to territorial Catholic sees on the basis that the state could not grant such "privileges" to "entities" that allegedly did not exist in law. Some of the Catholic dioceses, however, took the titles of bishoprics which had previously existed in England but were no longer used by the Anglican Church (e.g. Beverley – later divided into Leeds and Middlesbrough, Hexham – later changed to Hexham and Newcastle). In the few cases where a Catholic diocese bears the same title as an Anglican one in the same town or city (e.g., Birmingham, Liverpool, Portsmouth, and Southwark), this is the result of the Church of England ignoring the prior existence there of a Catholic see and of the repeal in 1871 of the Ecclesiastical Titles Act 1851. The act applied only to England and Wales, not Scotland or Ireland; thus official recognition afforded by the grant of arms to the Archdiocese of St Andrews and Edinburgh, brought into being by Lord Lyon in 1989, relied on the fact that the Ecclesiastical Titles Act 1851 never applied to Scotland. In recent times, the former Conservative Cabinet Minister John Gummer, a prominent convert to Catholicism and columnist for the Catholic Herald in 2007, objected to the fact that no Catholic diocese could have the same name as an Anglican diocese (such as London, Canterbury, Durham, etc.) "even though those dioceses had, shall we say, been borrowed".

=== Converts ===
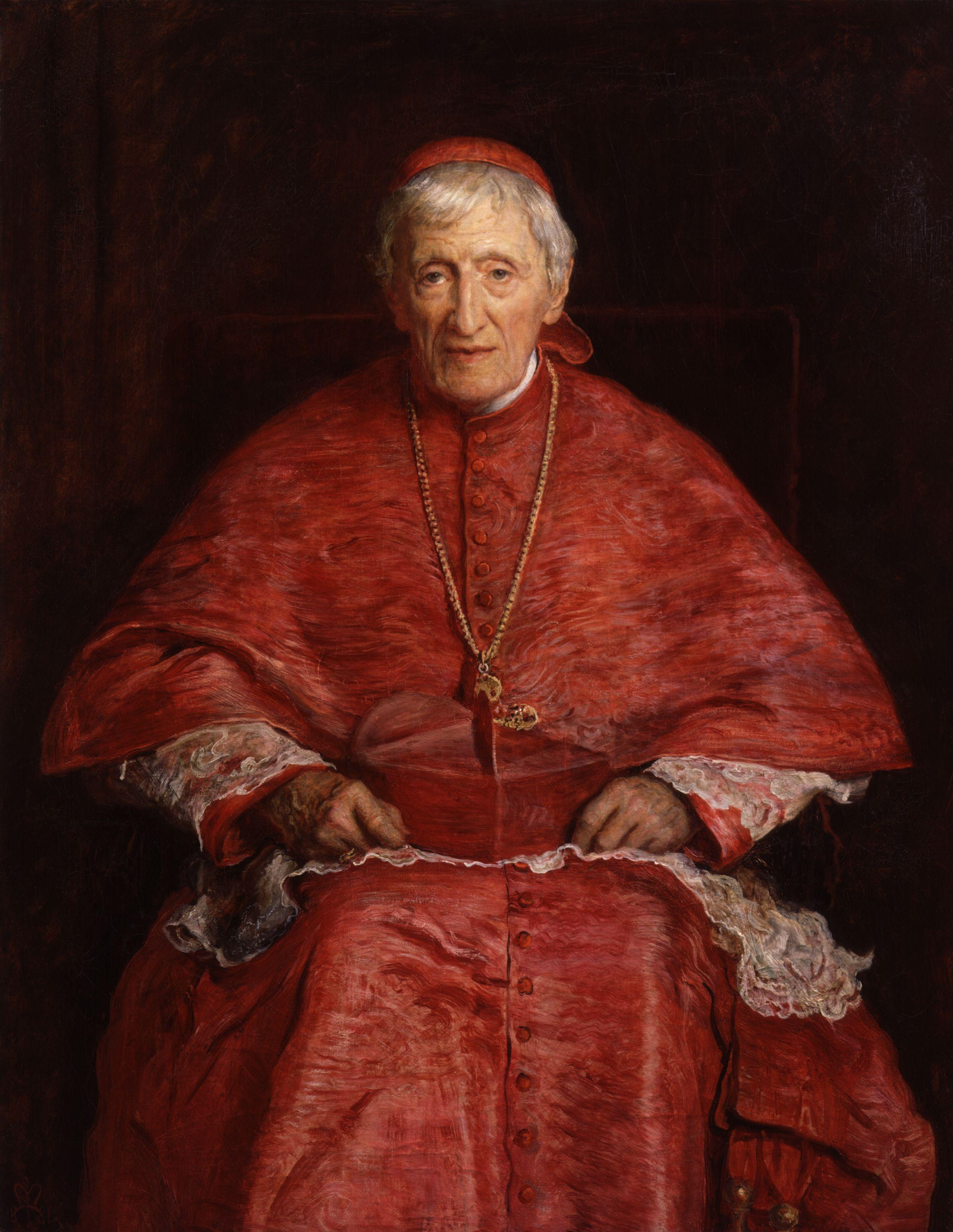
John Henry Newman

A proportion of the Anglicans who were involved in the Oxford Movement or "Tractarianism" were ultimately led beyond these positions and converted to the Catholic Church, including, in 1845, the movement's principal intellectual leader, John Henry Newman. More new Catholics would come from the Anglican Church, often via high Anglicanism, for at least the next hundred years, and something of this continues.

As anti-Catholicism declined sharply after 1910, the church grew in numbers, grew rapidly in terms of priests and sisters, and expanded their parishes from inner city industrial areas to more salubrious suburbs. Although underrepresented in the higher levels of the social structure, apart from a few old aristocratic Catholic families, Catholic talent was emerging in journalism, literature, the arts, and diplomacy.

A striking development was the surge in highly publicised conversion of intellectuals and writers including most famously G. K. Chesterton, as well as Robert Hugh Benson and Ronald Knox, Maurice Baring, Christopher Dawson, Eric Gill, Graham Greene, Manya Harari, David Jones, Sheila Kaye-Smith, Arnold Lunn, Rosalind Murray, Alfred Noyes, William E. Orchard, Frank Pakenham, Siegfried Sassoon, Edith Sitwell, Muriel Spark, Graham Sutherland, Oscar Wilde, Ford Madox Ford, and Evelyn Waugh. Pre-1900 famous converts included Cardinals Newman and Henry Edward Manning, the less famous like Ignatius Spencer as well as the leading architect of the Gothic Revival, Augustus Pugin, historian Thomas William Allies, and Jesuit poet Gerard Manley Hopkins. G. E. M. Anscombe was also a notable convert during the early 20th century.

Prominent cradle Catholics included the film director Alfred Hitchcock, writers such as Hilaire Belloc, Lord Acton and J. R. R. Tolkien and the composer Edward Elgar, whose oratorio The Dream of Gerontius was based on a 19th-century poem by Newman.

In 1994, Katharine, Duchess of Kent became the first member of the British royal family to convert to Catholicism since 1685.

Former Prime Minister Sir Tony Blair also converted to the Catholic Church, doing so in December 2007 after he had left office.

== Contemporary English Catholicism ==
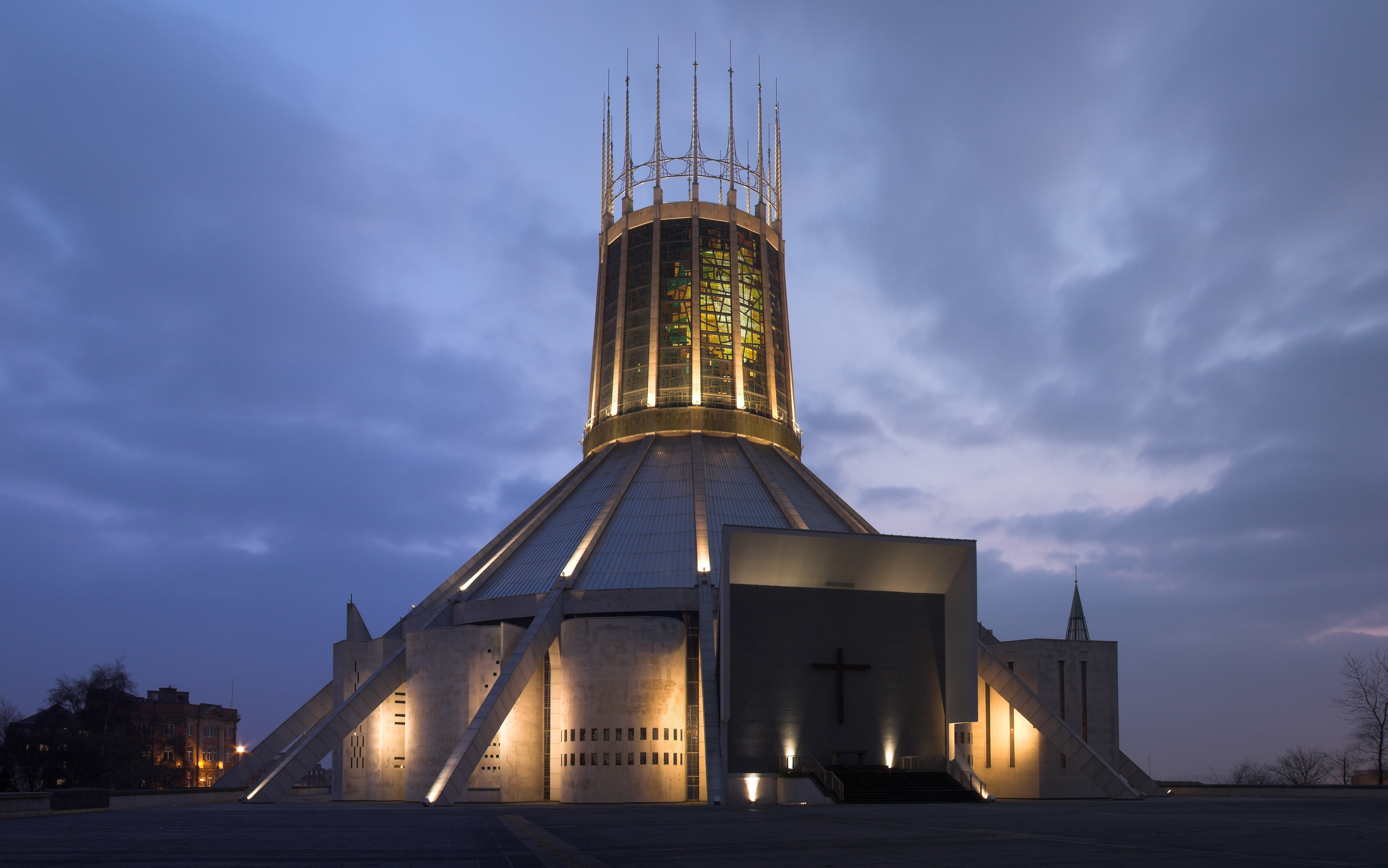
Liverpool Metropolitan Cathedral, Liverpool

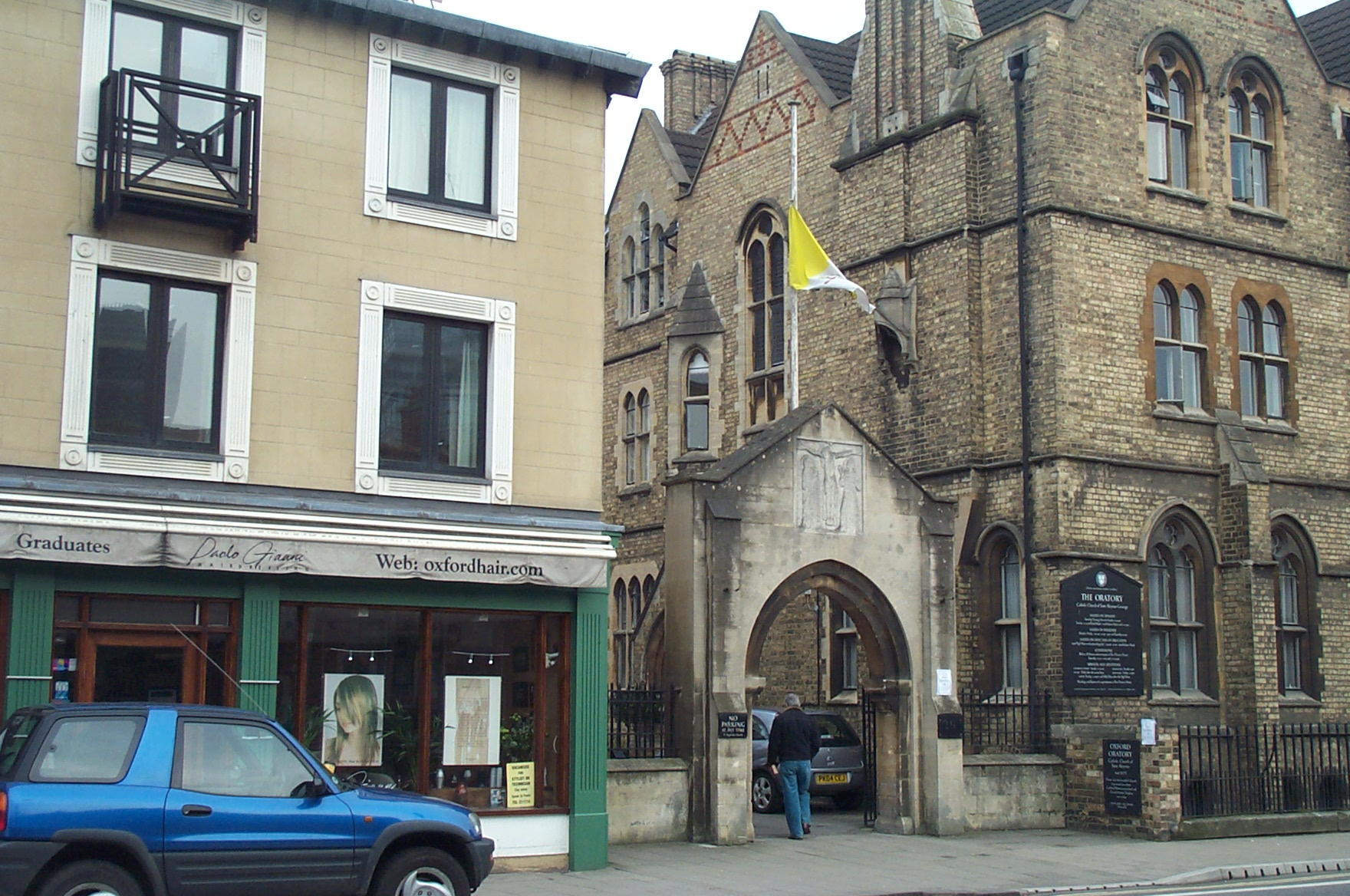
Oratory Church of St Aloysius Gonzaga, Oxford, with the flag of the Vatican City flying at half staff the day after the death of Pope John Paul II

English Catholicism continued to grow throughout the first two-thirds of the 20th century, when it was associated primarily with elements in the English intellectual class and the ethnic Irish population. Numbers attending Mass remained very high in contrast with some Protestant churches (though not the Church of England). Clergy numbers, which began the 20th century at under 3,000, reached a high of 7,500 in 1971.

By the latter years of the twentieth century low numbers of vocations also affected the church with ordinations to the priesthood dropping from the hundreds in the late 20th century into the teens in 2006–2011 (16 in 2009 for example) and a recovery into the 20s thereafter, with a prediction for 2018 of 24.

As in other English-speaking countries such as the United States and Australia, the movement of Irish Catholics out of the working-class into the middle-class suburban mainstream often meant their assimilation with broader, secular English society and loss of a separate Catholic identity. The Second Vatican Council has been followed, as in other Western countries, by divisions between Traditionalist Catholicism and a more liberal form of Catholicism claiming inspiration from the council. This caused difficulties for not a few pre-conciliar converts, though others have still joined the Church in recent decades (for instance, Malcolm Muggeridge, Alec Guinness, and Joseph Pearce). And public figures (often descendants of the recusant families) include Timothy Radcliffe, former Master of the Order of Preachers (Dominicans) and writer. Radcliffe is related to three late cardinals – Weld, Vaughan and Hume (the last because his cousin Lord Hunt is married to Hume's sister) – and his family is connected to many of the great recusant English Catholic families, the Arundels, Tichbournes, Talbots, Stourtons, Stonors, Welds and Blundells. There were also the families whose male line has died out such as the Grimshaws, the de la Barre Bodenhams or the Lubienski-Bodenhams. Among others in this group are Paul Johnson; Peter Ackroyd; Antonia Fraser; Mark Thompson, Director-General of the BBC; Michael Martin, first Catholic to hold the office of Speaker of the House of Commons since the Reformation; Chris Patten, first Catholic to hold the post of Chancellor of Oxford since the Reformation; Piers Paul Read; Helen Liddel, a former British High Commissioner to Australia; and former Prime Minister's wife Cherie Blair. These have no difficulty making their Catholicism known in public life. The former Prime Minister Tony Blair was received into full communion with the Catholic Church in 2007. Catherine Pepinster, editor of Tablet, notes: "The impact of Irish immigrants is one. There are numerous prominent campaigners, academics, entertainers (like Danny Boyle the most successful Catholic in showbiz owing to his film, Slumdog Millionaire), politicians and writers. But the descendants of the recusant families are still a force in the land."

Since the Second Vatican Council (Vatican II) the Church in England has tended to focus on ecumenical dialogue with the Anglican Church rather than winning converts from it as in the past. However, the 1990s have seen a number of conversions from Anglicanism to the Catholic Church, largely prompted by the Church of England's decision to ordain women as priests (among other moves away from traditional doctrines and structures). The resultant converts included members of the Royal Family (Katharine, Duchess of Kent, her son Lord Nicholas Windsor and her grandson Baron Downpatrick), Graham Leonard (former Anglican Bishop of London), Frances Shand Kydd (maternal grandmother of William, Prince of Wales and Prince Harry, Duke of Sussex), and a number of Anglican priests. Converts to Catholicism in Britain occur for any number of reasons, not least from "the mystical buoyant instinct" within each person to grow toward a profounder expression of what they believe. In 2019, Charles Moore, former editor of The Spectator, The Daily Telegraph, and authorized biographer of Margaret Thatcher, noted that his conversion in 1994 to Catholicism followed the Church of England's decision to ordain women, "unilaterally". The Church of England's "determination to do this," he said, "willy-nilly, come what may, meant that they weren't serious about Christian unity, because the Catholic and Orthodox had a different view." This view seems to match Graham Leonard's view and many other former Anglican clerics who, according to John Jay Hughes, have noted: "It is about authority, or lack of it, of the Church of England unilaterally to initiate a radical change in the priesthood, since it does not have its own, but only the priesthood of the whole Catholic church of which it had always claimed to be a part."

The spirit of ecumenism fostered by Vatican II resulted in 1990 with the Catholic Church in England, Wales, Scotland and Ireland joining Churches Together in Britain and Ireland as an expression of the churches' commitment to work ecumenically. In 2006, for example, a memorial was put up to St John Houghton and fellow Carthusian monks martyred at the London Charterhouse, 1535. Anglican priest Geoffrey Curtis campaigned for it with the current archbishop of Canterbury's blessing. Also, in another ecumenical gesture, a plaque in Holywell Street, Oxford, now commemorates the Catholic martyrs of England. It reads: "Near this spot George Nichols, Richard Yaxley, Thomas Belson, and Humphrey Pritchard were executed for their Catholic faith, 5 July 1589." This action, however, did not please some Catholics, as the chair of the Latin Mass Society, Joseph Shaw, noted in a letter dated 2020: "As Mgr. Ronald Knox pointed out: 'Each of them [martyrs] died in the belief that he was bearing witness to the truth; and if you accept both testimonies undiscriminately, then you are making nonsense of them both.'" And at Lambeth Palace, in February 2009, the Archbishop of Canterbury hosted a reception to launch a book, Why Go To Church?, by Fr Timothy Radcliffe OP, one of Britain's best known religious and the former master of the Dominican Order. A large number of young Dominican friars attended. Fr Radcliffe said, "I don't think there have been so many Dominicans in one place since the time of Robert Kilwardby, the Dominican Archbishop of Canterbury in the 13th century."

Currently, along with the 22 Latin Church dioceses, there are two dioceses of the Eastern Catholic Churches: the Ukrainian Catholic Eparchy of Holy Family of London and the Syro-Malabar Catholic Eparchy of Great Britain. The Personal Ordinariate of Our Lady of Walsingham, for Anglican-tradition converts to Catholicism, was erected by Pope Benedict XVI in 2011.

=== Social action ===
The Church's principles of social justice influenced initiatives to tackle the challenges of poverty and social inclusion. In Southampton, Fr Pat Murphy O'Connor founded the St Dismas Society as an agency to meet the needs of ex-prisoners discharged from Winchester prison. Some of St Dismas Society's early members went on to help found the Simon Community in Sussex then in London. Their example gave new inspiration to other clergy, such as the Revd Kenneth Leech (CofE) of St Anne's Church, Soho, who helped found the homeless charity Centrepoint, and the Revd Bruce Kenrick (Church of Scotland) who helped found the homeless charity Shelter. In 1986 Cardinal Basil Hume established the Cardinal Hume Centre to work with homeless young people, badly housed families and local communities to access accommodation, support and advice, education, training and employment opportunities.

The Caritas Social Action Network (CSAN), created with the merger of previous organisations, federates the different Catholic actors active in the social field in England and Wales. Its counterpart for international development and humanitarian aid is the Catholic Agency for Overseas Development (CAFOD). Both organisations are members of Caritas Internationalis and Caritas Europa. Diocesan social welfare agencies exist in various dioceses, such as Nugent, an affiliate of the Archdiocese of Liverpool named after Fr James Nugent (1822-1905), Fr Hudson's Society in the Archdiocese of Birmingham, and Catholic Care in the Diocese of Leeds.

In 2006 Cardinal Cormac Murphy-O'Connor instituted an annual Mass in Support of Migrant Workers at Westminster Cathedral in partnership with the ethnic chaplains of Brentwood, Southwark and Westminster.

=== Education ===
As of June 2024 there are over 2,100 Catholic places of education – nurseries, schools, special schools, colleges, and universities – in England and Wales. The Catholic Church operated the largest network of academies in England.

== Controversies ==
=== Adoption ===
On 3 November 2016, John Bingham, Head of Media at the Church of England and whose own church acknowledged in 2026 that it took 185,000 babies from unwed mothers between 1949-1976, reported in The Daily Telegraph that Cardinal Vincent Nichols officially acknowledged that the Catholic Church in England and Wales had pressured young unmarried mothers in the country to put their children up for adoption in agencies linked to the Catholic Church throughout the decades following World War II and offered an apology.

=== Child abuse ===
In November 2020 the Independent Inquiry into Child Sexual Abuse reported that between 1970 and 2015, the church in England and Wales had received more than 900 complaints involving more than 3,000 instances of child sexual abuse, made against almost 1,000 individuals, including priests, monks and church associates. In light of such serious and persistent allegations over decades, the Inquiry had hoped to gain the cooperation of the Vatican. In the event its repeated requests were thwarted. As a result, there have been calls for resignations of prelates in leadership roles both from victims, their families and supporters. The inquiry has not spared criticism of the church for prioritising its reputation over the suffering of victims. Cardinal Nichols was singled out in the inquiry report for lack of personal responsibility, or of compassion towards victims. However he has indicated he would not be resigning as he was "determined to put it right". In another article by Pepinster, she notes that the late Cardinal Basil Hume was "remembered for showing empathy to survivors but offered only pastoral care and kindness."

== Organisation ==
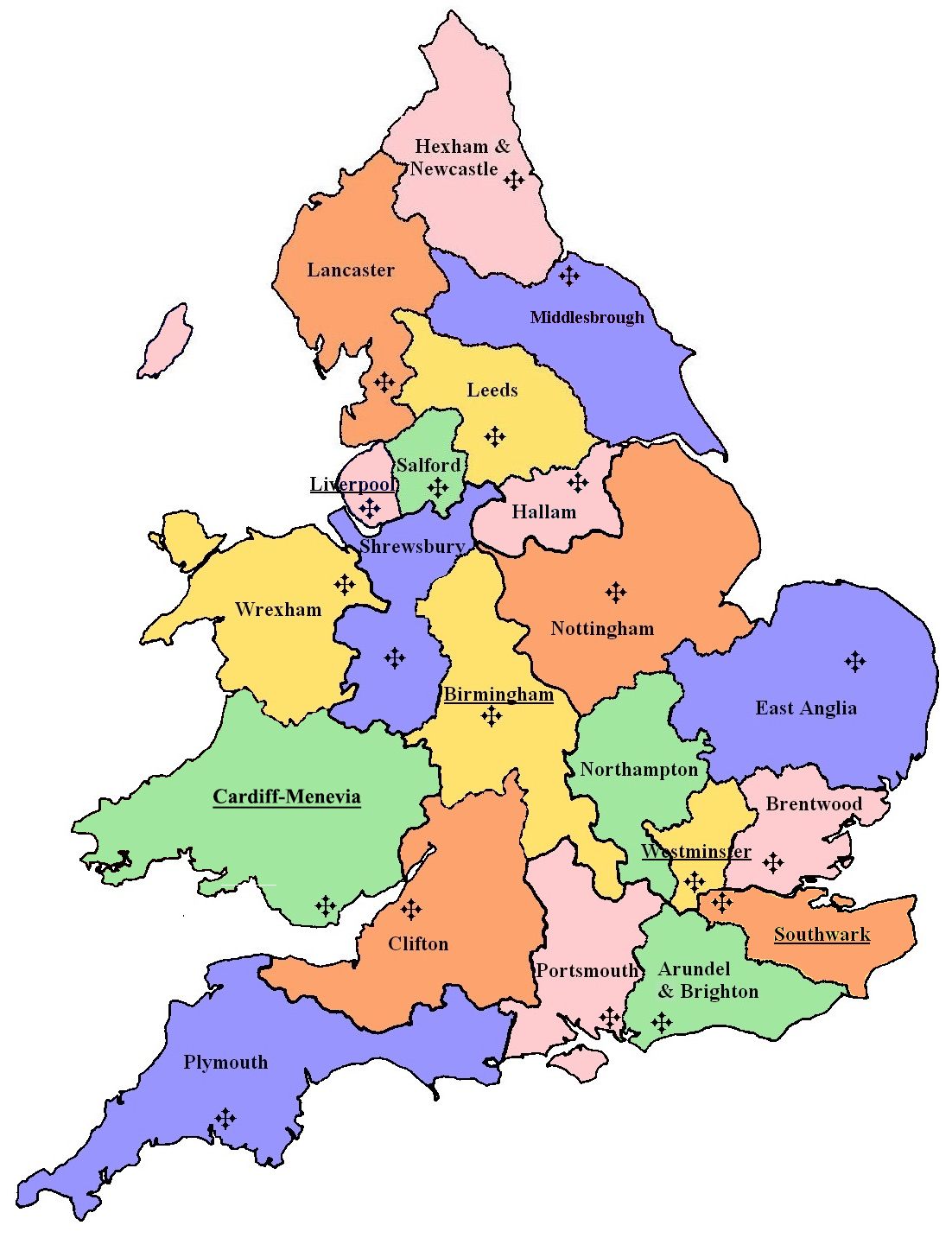
Dioceses in England and Wales

The Catholic Church in England and Wales has five provinces: Birmingham, Cardiff, Liverpool, Southwark and Westminster. There are 21 dioceses which are divided into parishes (for comparison, the Church of England and Church in Wales currently have a total of 50 dioceses). In addition to these, there are four dioceses covering England and Wales for specific groups which are the Bishopric of the Forces, the Eparchy for Ukrainians, the Syro-Malabar Catholic Eparchy of Great Britain and the Personal Ordinariate for former Anglicans.

The Catholic bishops in England and Wales come together in a collaborative structure known as the Catholic Bishops' Conference of England and Wales. Currently the Archbishop of Westminster, Vincent Gerard Nichols, is the president of the Bishops' Conference. For this reason in the global Catholic Church (outside England), he is de facto Primate of England though not in the eyes of English law and the established Church of England. Historically, the avoidance of the title of "Primate" was to eschew whipping up anti-Catholic tension, in the same way the bishops of the restored hierarchy avoided using current titles of Anglican sees (Archbishop of Westminster rather than "Canterbury" or "London"). However, the Archbishop of Westminster had certain privileges: he was the only metropolitan in the country until 1911 (when the archdioceses of Birmingham and Liverpool were created) and he has always acted as leader at meetings of the English bishops.

Although the bishops of the restored hierarchy were obliged to take new titles, such as that of Westminster, they saw themselves very much in continuity with the pre-Reformation Church. Westminster in particular saw itself as the continuation of Canterbury, hence the similarity of the coat of arms of the two sees (with Westminster believing it has more right to it since it features the pallium, no longer given to Anglican archbishops). At the back of Westminster Cathedral is a list of popes and, alongside this, a list of Catholic Archbishops of Canterbury beginning with Augustine of Canterbury and the year they received the pallium. After Cardinal Pole, the last Catholic incumbent of Canterbury, the names of the Catholic vicars apostolic or titular bishops (from 1685) are recorded and then the Archbishops of Westminster, in one unimpaired line, from 597 to the present, according to the Archdiocese of Westminster. To highlight this historical continuity, dating back to Pope Gregory I's appointment of Augustine and his sequent bestowal of the pallium on the appointee, the installation rites of pre-Reformation Catholic Archbishops of Canterbury and earlier Archbishops of Westminster were used at the installation of the current Cardinal Archbishop of Westminster, Vincent Gerard Nichols. He also became the forty-third of the English cardinals since the 12th century.

=== Hierarchy ===
Diocese	Province	Approximate Territory	Cathedral	Creation
Diocese of Arundel and Brighton; Bishop of Arundel and Brighton	Southwark	Surrey (excluding Spelthorne) and Sussex	Cathedral Church of Our Lady and St Philip Howard	1965 (from Diocese of Southwark)
Archdiocese of Birmingham; Archbishop of Birmingham	Birmingham	West Midlands, Staffordshire, Warwickshire, Worcestershire, Oxfordshire north of the Thames	Metropolitan Cathedral Church and Basilica of St Chad	1850 (elevated to Archdiocese 1911)
Diocese of Brentwood; Bishop of Brentwood	Westminster	Historic County of Essex (including North-east Greater London)	Cathedral Church of St Mary and St Helen	1917 (from Archdiocese of Westminster)
Archdiocese of Cardiff-Menevia; Archbishop of Cardiff-Menevia	Cardiff	Glamorgan, Herefordshire, Monmouthshire, Brecknockshire, Cardiganshire, Carmarthenshire, Pembrokeshire, and Radnorshire.	Metropolitan Cathedral Church of St David	1850 (originally as Diocese of Newport and Menevia; as Diocese of Newport from 1895; elevated to Archdiocese of Cardiff 1916; merged with Diocese of Menevia 2024)
Diocese of Clifton; Bishop of Clifton	Birmingham	Bristol, Gloucestershire, Somerset, Wiltshire	Cathedral Church of Ss Peter and Paul	1850
Diocese of East Anglia; Bishop of East Anglia	Westminster	Peterborough, Cambridgeshire, Norfolk, Suffolk	Cathedral Church of St John the Baptist	1976 (from Diocese of Northampton)
Diocese of Hallam; Bishop of Hallam	Liverpool	South Yorkshire, High Peak, north Derbyshire, Chesterfield, Bassetlaw	Cathedral Church of St Marie	1980 (from Dioceses of Leeds and Nottingham)
Diocese of Hexham and Newcastle; Bishop of Hexham and Newcastle	Liverpool	Tyne and Wear, Northumberland, County Durham	Cathedral Church of St Mary	1850 (originally as Diocese of Hexham; as Hexham and Newcastle from 1861)
Diocese of Lancaster; Bishop of Lancaster	Liverpool	Cumbria and Northern Lancashire	Cathedral Church of St Peter	1924 (from Diocese of Hexham and Newcastle and Archdiocese of Liverpool)
Diocese of Leeds; Bishop of Leeds	Liverpool	Historic West Riding of Yorkshire excluding South Yorkshire	Cathedral Church of St Anne	1878 (from Diocese of Beverley)
Archdiocese of Liverpool; Archbishop of Liverpool	Liverpool	Merseyside north of the Mersey, West Lancashire, Isle of Man	Metropolitan Cathedral Church of Christ the King	1850 (elevated to Archdiocese 1911)
Diocese of Middlesbrough; Bishop of Middlesbrough	Liverpool	Historic North Riding of Yorkshire, historic East Riding of Yorkshire, York	Cathedral Church of St Mary the Virgin	1878 (from Diocese of Beverley)
Diocese of Northampton; Bishop of Northampton	Westminster	Northamptonshire, Bedfordshire, Buckinghamshire, Berkshire north of the Thames	Cathedral Church of St Mary and St Thomas	1850
Diocese of Nottingham; Bishop of Nottingham	Westminster	Derbyshire, Nottinghamshire, Leicestershire, Rutland, Lincolnshire	Cathedral Church of St Barnabas	1850
Diocese of Plymouth; Bishop of Plymouth	Southwark	Cornwall, Devon, Dorset	Cathedral Church of St Mary and St Boniface	1850
Diocese of Portsmouth; Bishop of Portsmouth	Southwark	Hampshire, Isle of Wight, Berkshire and Oxfordshire south of the Thames, The Channel Islands	Cathedral Church of St John the Evangelist	1882 (from Diocese of Southwark)
Diocese of Salford; Bishop of Salford	Liverpool	Part of Greater Manchester, South-east Lancashire	Cathedral Church of St John the Evangelist	1850
Diocese of Shrewsbury; Bishop of Shrewsbury	Birmingham	Cheshire, Shropshire, the Wirral and Manchester south of the Mersey	Cathedral Church of Our Lady Help of Christians and Saint Peter of Alcantara	1850
Archdiocese of Southwark; Archbishop of Southwark	Southwark	Kent, Greater London south of the Thames	Metropolitan Cathedral Church of St George	1850 (elevated to Archdiocese 1965)
Archdiocese of Westminster; Archbishop of Westminster	Westminster	Hertfordshire, historic County of Middlesex (i.e. North-west Greater London, plus Spelthorne in Surrey)	Metropolitan Cathedral Church of the Most Precious Blood	1850
Diocese of Wrexham; Bishop of Wrexham	Cardiff	Anglesey, Caernarfonshire, Denbighshire, Flintshire, Merionethshire and Montgomeryshire	Cathedral Church of Our Lady of Sorrows	1987 (from Diocese of Menevia)
Eparchy of the Holy Family of London; Eparch of the Holy Family of London	Exempt	Great Britain	Cathedral Church of the Holy Family in Exile	1957 (elevated to Eparchy 2013)
Syro-Malabar Catholic Eparchy of Great Britain Eparch of Great Britain	Exempt	Great Britain	Syro-Malabar Cathedral of St Alphonsa	2016
Bishopric of the Forces in Great Britain; Bishop of the Forces	Exempt	HM Forces both in Britain and abroad	Cathedral Church of St Michael and St George	1986
Personal Ordinariate of Our Lady of Walsingham; Ordinary of the Personal Ordinariate of Our Lady of Walsingham	Exempt	Former Anglican clergy, religious and laity resident in England, Wales and Scotland.	Principal Church of Our Lady of the Assumption and St Gregory	2011

=== Youth services ===
Many dioceses operate specialist youth service provision, such as the Youth Service of the Diocese of Leeds, the Youth Ministry Team in the Diocese of Hexham and Newcastle, the Brentwood Catholic Youth Service, and the Youth Service in the Diocese of Arundel and Brighton.

=== Ordinariate of Our Lady of Walsingham ===
In October 2009, following closed-circuit talks between some Anglicans and the Holy See, Pope Benedict made a relatively unconditional offer to accommodate disaffected Anglicans in the Church of England, enabling them, for the first time, to retain parts of their liturgy and heritage under Anglicanorum coetibus, while being in full communion with Rome. By April 2012 the UK ordinariate numbered about 1200, including five bishops and 60 priests. The ordinariate has recruited a group of aristocrats as honorary vice-presidents to help out. These include the Duke of Norfolk, the Countess of Oxford and Asquith and the Duchess of Somerset. Other vice-presidents include Lord Nicholas Windsor, Sir Josslyn Gore-Booth and the Squire de Lisle, whose ancestor Ambrose de Lisle was a 19th-century Catholic convert who advocated the corporate reunion of the Anglican Church with Rome. According to the first Ordinary, Mgr Keith Newton, the ordinariate will "work on something with an Anglican flavour, but they are not bringing over any set of Anglican liturgy". The director of music at Westminster Abbey (Anglican), lay Catholic James O'Donnell, likens the ordinariate to a Uniate church or one of the many non-Latin Catholic rites, saying: "This is a good opportunity for us to remember that there isn't a one size fits all, and that this could be a good moment to adopt the famous civil service philosophy – 'celebrating diversity'." In May 2013 a former Anglican priest, Alan Hopes, was appointed the new bishop of East Anglia, whose diocese includes the Shrine of Our Lady of Walsingham. In 2021, the former Anglican bishop of Rochester, Michael Nazir-Ali, joined the Ordinariate, noting: "I believe that the Anglican desire to adhere to apostolic, patristic and conciliar teaching can now best be maintained in the Ordinariate." Nazir-Ali also shared with Dr. Foley Beach, chairman of the Global Anglican Future Conference, "his willingness to continue to assist" that movement "in any way that might be suitable." In April 2022, Pope Francis granted Nazir-Ali the title "Prelate of Honour." He may now be addressed as "Monsignor."

=== Eastern Catholic Churches ===
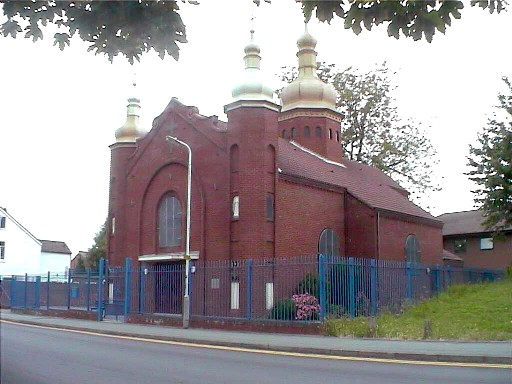
A Ukrainian Greek Catholic parish church in Wolverhampton, England

There exists the Apostolic Exarchate for Ukrainians which serves the 15,000 Ukrainian Greek Catholics in Great Britain, with a cathedral and various churches across the country.

The Maronite Church in the United Kingdom is under the jurisdiction of the Maronite Eparchy of Europe. The Lebanese Maronite Order (OLM) is in charge of serving the Maronite Catholics in the UK and it is a registered Charity in England and Wales. The OLM is an order of the Maronite Catholic Church. Father Fadi KMEID is the parish priest for Maronites. The OLM runs a few churches, for example Our Lady of Lebanon in Paddington serving the Lebanese Maronite community and the church of The Holy Family of Nazareth serving the Cypriot Maronite community.

There are also Catholic chaplains involved in the ministries of Eastern Catholic Churches (of Eritrean, Chaldean, Syriac, Syro-Malabar, Syro-Malankara, and Melkite communities). For information about the Syro-Malabar chaplaincy within the Diocese of Westminster in London, see Syro-Malabar Catholic Church of London.

== Demography ==
=== General statistics ===
At the 2001 United Kingdom census, there were 4.2 million Catholics in England and Wales, some 8.3 per cent of the population. One hundred years earlier, in 1901, they represented only 4.8 per cent of the population (approximately 1.8 million people). In 1981, 8.7 per cent of the population of England and Wales were Catholic. In 2009, an Ipsos Mori poll found that 9.6 per cent, or 5.2 million persons of all ethnicities were Catholic in England and Wales. Sizeable populations include North West England where one in five is Catholic, a result of large-scale Irish immigration in the nineteenth century as well as the high number of English recusants in Lancashire.

Migration from Ireland in the 19th and 20th centuries and more recent Eastern European migration have significantly increased the numbers of Catholics in England and Wales, although Pew Research data and stats of 2018 point to other factors at work. According to Pew researchers, 19% of UK adults identify as Catholic. The Eastern European members are mainly from Poland, with smaller numbers from Lithuania, Latvia, and Slovakia. According to the World Factbook as of 2020, the ethnic/racial composition of UK was "white": 87.2%; "non-white": 12.8%. A 2022 report, however, noted the "white" population of England and Wales had dropped from 86% in 2011 to 81.7% in 2021.

=== Polish Catholic immigration ===
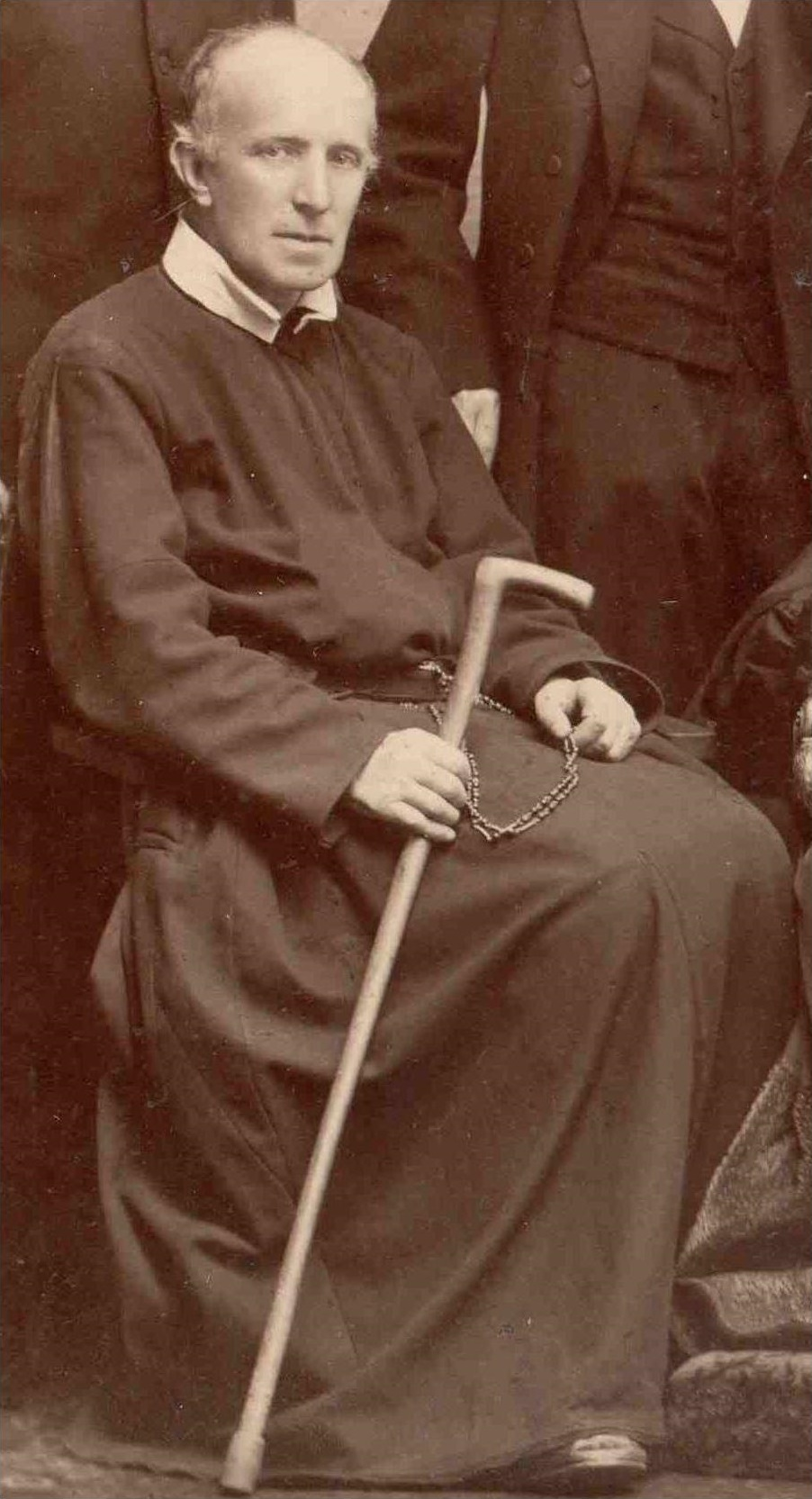
The Venerable Bernard Łubieński CSsR, c. 1900

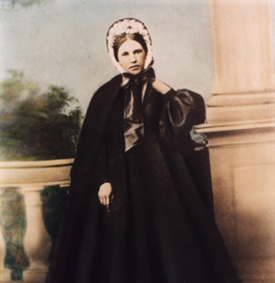
Blessed Frances Siedliska CSFN, c. 1880

On the accession of Poland to the European Union in 2004 there has been large-scale Polish immigration to the UK, up to 900 000 people as of 2017 have come. The Polish Catholic Mission reports that only about 10% of the newly arrived Poles attend church regularly. For those it has around 219 branches and pastoral centres with 114 priests. The Vicars Delegate who manage the "chaplaincy" of the Polish Catholic Mission since then have been Mgr. Tadeusz Kukla up to 2010, succeeded by the Mgr. Stefan Wylężek. In Poland, the Polish Bishops Conference has a bishop Delegate, with special responsibility for the spiritual needs of émigré Poles. The postholder since 2011 has been Bishop Wiesław Cichowski. The Tablet reported in December 2007 that the Polish Catholic Mission as stating that its branches follow a pastoral programme set by the Polish conference of bishops and are viewed as "an integral part of the Polish church".

==== History ====
Polish-speaking Catholics first arrived in the United Kingdom in some numbers after the 19th century national insurgencies in 1831 and 1863 which had arisen, especially in the Russian sector, in the wake of the Partitions of the Lithuanian – Polish commonwealth during the late 18th century. In 1864 through the efforts of general Zamoyski and Cardinal Wiseman, Rev. Chwaliszewski was invited to come to London and lead services in the Polish chapel at St. Peter's Hatton Garden. Worthy of note in this period was the Polish figure of The Venerable Bernard Łubieński (1846–1933) closely associated with Bishop Robert Coffin and who, after an education at Ushaw College, in 1864 entered the Redemptorists at Clapham and spent some years as a missionary in the British Isles, before returning to his native land.

The Polish Catholic Mission was placed on a permanent footing in 1894 by Cardinal Vaughan, the then Archbishop of Westminster. The nucleus of the mission and its chaplaincy was formed by Blessed Franciszka Siedliska (1842–1902), founder of the Congregation of the Holy Family of Nazareth and its spiritual director, rev. Lechert CR. Sr. Siedliska and two sisters started a Polish language primary school. From then on Polish services were regularly held in a chapel first in Globe Street, then in Cambridge Heath Road in Bethnal Green in the East End of London, where most exiled Poles were living at the time.

After World War I, the Polish chaplaincy was in the rented Polish church in Mercer Street in North London. In 1928 the local authority condemned the building as unsafe. That same year the exiled community was visited by cardinal Aleksander Kakowski with bishop Przeździeński from the diocese of Siedlce and Polish ambassador, Konstanty Skirmunt. After an extended search, a building was bought from the Swedenborg Society in Devonia Road, Islington. Cardinal Bourne of Westminster, helped the mission with a £1000 loan for refurbishment. It became the first Polish-owned ecclesiastical building in the British Isles. It was consecrated on 30 October 1930 by cardinal August Hlond, primate of Poland in the presence of cardinal Bourne. In 1938 rev. Władysław Staniszewski became chaplain to the mission.

After World War II, the pastoral task had swelled to almost 200,000 displaced people – mainly soldiers. Many Polish servicemen were unable to return to their homeland following the annexation of half of Poland's territory by the USSR and the imposition of a communist regime in the newly reconfigured Poland. The Polish Resettlement Corps was formed by the British government to ease their transition into British life. They were joined by several thousand Displaced Persons (DPs), many of whom were their family members. This influx of Poles gave rise to the Polish Resettlement Act 1947 which allowed approximately 250,000 Polish Servicemen and their dependents to settle in Britain. Many assimilated into existing Catholic congregations. Among them were also 120 Military chaplains and priests, along with a minority of Orthodox, Lutheran and Armenian Christians with their own chaplains. There was also a minority Jewish contingent and a handful of Muslims among the soldiers.

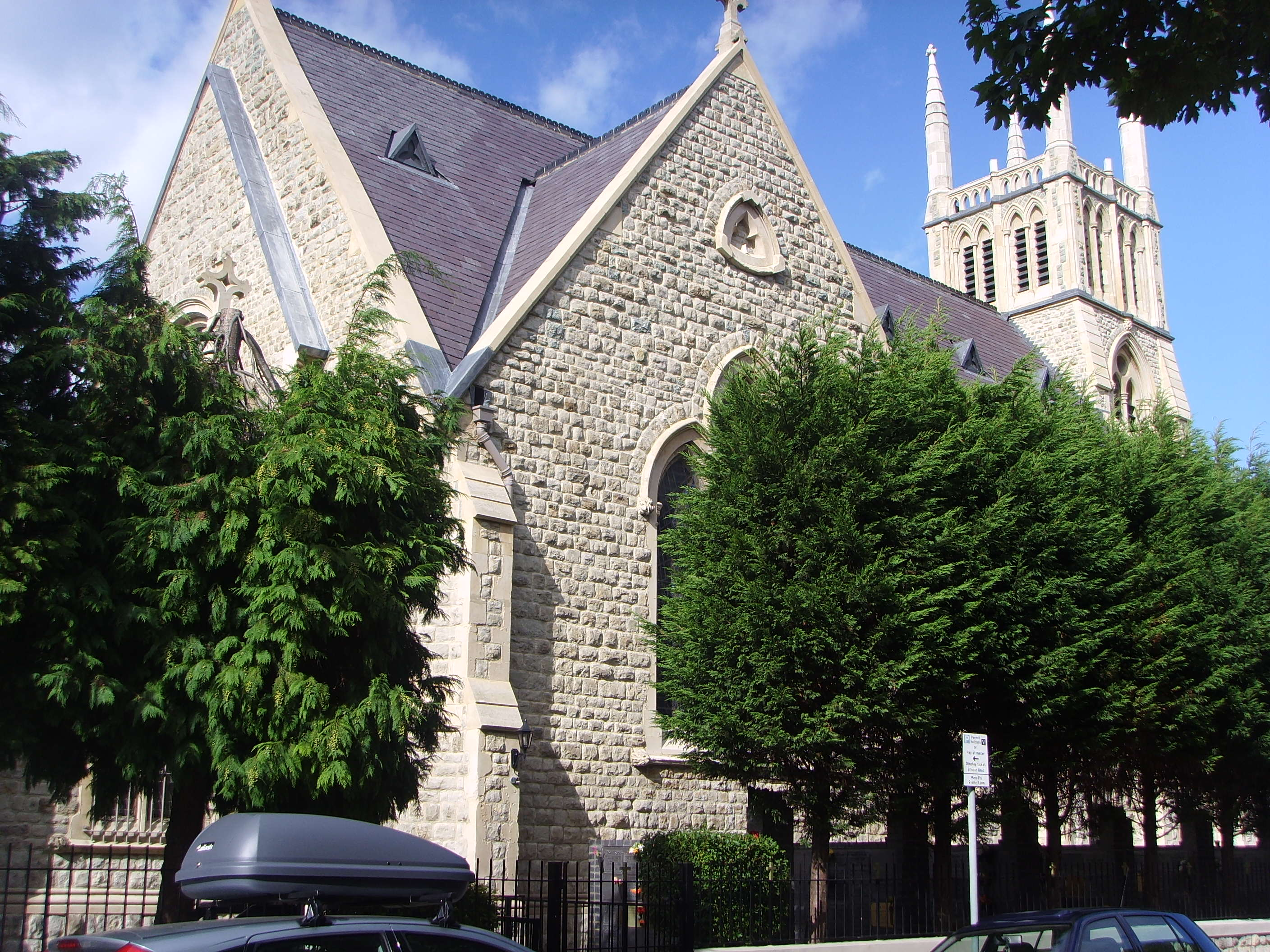
St Andrew Bobola Church, Hammersmith regarded as the Polish "garrison" church

In 1948, following a visit to Poland the previous year for talks with cardinal Hlond, and after consulting with the Catholic episcopate of England and Wales, Cardinal Bernard Griffin nominated the rector of the Polish Catholic Mission, rev. Staniszewski as Vicar delegate for civilian Poles in England and Wales, with the powers of an Ordinariate. Around this time Archbishop Hlond had nominated Bishop Józef Gawlina, also a Divisional general and based in Rome, to be responsible overall for the Polish diaspora. Between them, this enabled the then rector in England to engage priests and organize regular pastoral care across 18 dioceses in England and Wales. The Catholic hierarchy in England and Wales agreed to the appointment of a Vicar Delegate, nominated by the Polish Episcopate, with ordinary power over the Polish clergy throughout England and Wales, with certain exceptions relating to marriage.

On the pastoral front, the temporary Polish parish hosted in Central London by the fathers of Brompton Oratory was able to be moved westward in 1962 to the newly acquired St Andrew Bobola church in Shepherd's Bush, the second Polish owned church in London since 1930. It is regarded as an unofficial garrison church with memorials to many historical Polish Army regiments. The Mission was boosted by the integration of male religious orders, the Polish Jesuits in Willesden, north-west London, the Marian fathers in Ealing and formerly the college at Fawley Court. Latterly, these have been joined by the Society of Christ Fathers, dedicated to minister to the Polish diaspora, who run a parish in Putney in London.

==== Anomalous Polish "parishes" ====
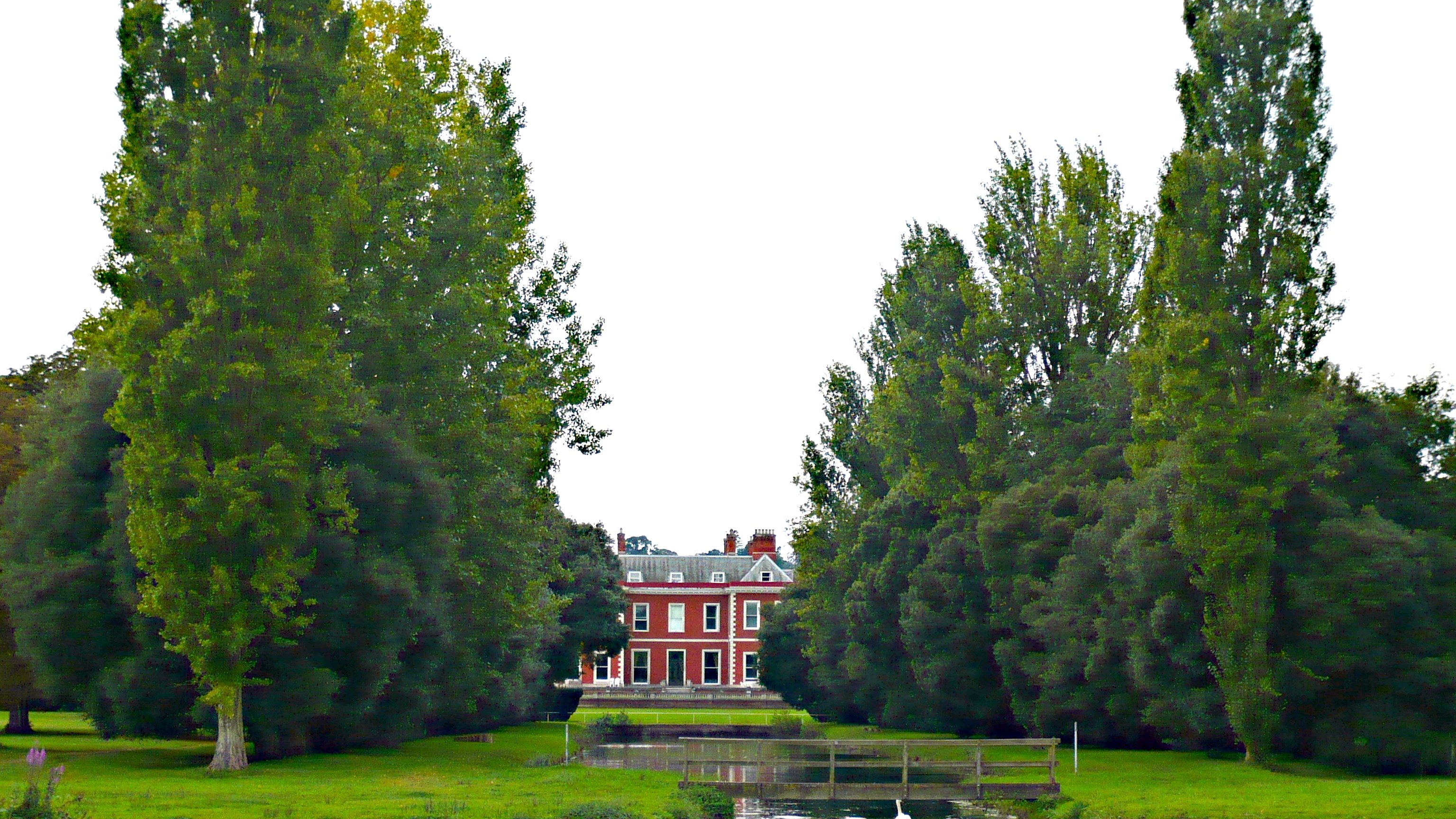
The erstwhile Polish Divine Mercy College at Fawley Court, Buckinghamshire

Since the original agreement between the English and Polish church hierarchies in 1948, whenever a Polish Catholic community emerges within England and Wales, the vicar delegate appoints a Polish priest to organise a local branch of the Polish Catholic Mission. A priest thus appointed is the Catholic version of a "priest in charge", but he is not actually a parish priest. There are strictly no Polish parishes or quasiparishes in England and Wales (in accordance with Canons 515 §1 and 516 §1) with the exception of the original church on Devonia Road in Islington. A Polish community is sometimes referred to as a "parish", but is not a parish in the canonical sense. Hence the Polish community attending a "Polish church" is not a "judicial person". The canonical judicial person which represents the interests of all Polish communities of worship is vested in the Polish Catholic Mission.

In December 2007, Cardinal Cormac Murphy-O'Connor said: "I'm quite concerned that Poles are creating a separate Church in Britain – I would want them to be part of the Catholic life of this country. I would hope those responsible for the Polish Church here, and the Poles themselves, will be aware that they should become a part of local parishes as soon as possible when they learn enough of the language." Mgr Kukla stressed that the Polish Catholic Mission continues to have a "good relationship" with the hierarchy in England and Wales and said "Integration is a long process".

The Polish Catholic Mission co-operated with the English hierarchy's 2008 research inquiry into the needs of migrants in London's Catholic community. The inquiry had been commissioned by the Archdiocese of Westminster, Archbishop Kevin McDonald of Southwark and Bishop Thomas McMahon of Brentwood. Around 1000 people attending Mass in three London dioceses were surveyed using anonymous questionnaires available in Polish, Lithuanian, Chinese, French, Spanish, Portuguese and English. The congregations were drawn from mainstream diocesan parishes, ethnic chaplaincies and churches of the Polish vicariate. The report findings described how 86% of eastern Europeans said the availability of Mass in their mother-tongue was a reason for their choosing to worship in a particular church. One of the report's recommendations emphasised cooperation with key overseas bishops conferences, dioceses and religious institutes on the recruitment and appointment of ethnic chaplains.

== Miracles ==
A number of events which Catholics hold to be miracles are associated with England.

=== Marian apparitions ===
A number of Marian apparitions are associated with England, the best known are the following;

- Our Lady of Mount Carmel, associated with Simon Stock at Aylesford
- Our Lady of Walsingham, associated with Richeldis de Faverches at Walsingham
- Our Lady of the Immaculate Conception, associated with Helsim the Abbot in the North Sea
- Our Lady of Evesham, associated with Egwin of Evesham at Evesham
- Our Lady of Canterbury, associated with Dunstan and Anselm at Canterbury
- Our Lady of London, associated with Thomas Becket and Hildegard von Bingen at London
- Our Lady of Jervaulx, associated with Abbot John Kingston of Byland at Jervaulx
- Our Lady of Durham, associated with Godric of Finchale at Durham
- Our Lady of Ipswich, associated with Anne Wentworth at Ipswich

=== Pilgrimages ===
Augustine Camino, ending at Pugin's Church and Shrine of St. Augustine, Ramsgate

=== Incorruptibility ===
A number of cases of alleged incorruptibility of some Catholic saints are associated with England;

- Æthelthryth of Ely, hand discovered in 1811
- Cuthbert of Lindisfarne, relics destroyed under Henry VIII
- Werburgh of Chester, relics destroyed under Henry VIII

Now believed to be buried beneath her shrine in Chester cathedral.

- Wihtburh of East Anglia, relics destroyed under Henry VIII
- Winibald of Wessex, tomb found empty in 1968
- Guthlac of Crowland, relics destroyed by Vikings
- Ælfheah of Canterbury, buried at Canterbury Cathedral
- Edward the Confessor, bodily allegedly intact in 1269, skeleton by 1685
- Hugh of Lincoln, tomb pillaged in 1364, shrine destroyed under Henry VIII
- Edmund of Abingdon, taken to Pontigny Abbey in France
- John Southworth, returned to Westminster Cathedral in 1927

=== Stigmata ===
Two cases of alleged stigmata are associated with England, neither have been approved by the Vatican;

- 1880: Teresa Helena Higginson, Servant of God, at Gainsborough, Lincolnshire
- 1986: Patricia de Menezes, at Surrey

=== Catholic saints associated with England ===
See Catholic Church in the United Kingdom for English Saints, English Catholics declared Blessed, Venerable, and Servants of God, past and present. The list includes Welsh, Scot, Irish, and English saints.

== See also ==
- Agatha Christie indult
- Carthusian Martyrs
- Catholic Church by country
- Catholic Church in Ireland
- Catholic Church in Scotland
- Catholic Church in the United Kingdom
- Catholic National Library
- Catholic schools in the United Kingdom
- Colleges of St Omer, Bruges and Liège
- Council of London in 1102
- English College, Rome
- Forty Martyrs of England and Wales
- Latin Mass Society of England and Wales
- List of Catholic churches in the United Kingdom
- List of Catholic martyrs of the English Reformation
- List of English cardinals
- Priest hole
- The Stripping of the Altars

== Sources ==
=== References ===
- Peter Ackroyd Albion: The origins of the English Imagination (New York: Anchor Random, 2002) ISBN 0-385-49773-3
- Virginia Blanton Signs of Devotion: The Cult of St. AEthelthryth in Medieval England, 695–1615 (University Park: Penn State University, 2007) ISBN 0-271-02984-6
- John Bossy The English Catholic Community 1570-1850 (London: Darton, Longman and Todd Company, 1975) ISBN 978-0-232-51284-7
- Michael Burleigh Sacred Causes (New York: HarperCollins, 2007) ISBN 978-0-06-058095-7
- Thomas Clancy, S.J., English Catholic Books, 1641–1700 (Cambridge: Scolar Press, 1996) ISBN 1-85928-329-2
- Thomas Clancy, S.J., English Catholic Books, 1701–1800 (Cambridge: Scolar Press, 1996) ISBN 1-85928-148-6
- Eamon Duffy The Stripping of the Altars: Traditional Religion in England 1400-1580 2nd ed. (New Haven: Yale University Press, 2005) ISBN 978-0-300-10828-6.
- Eamon Duffy The Voices of Morebath (New Haven: Yale University Press, 2001) ISBN 0-300-09825-1
- Eamon Duffy Marking the Hours: English People and their Prayers 1240–1570 (New Haven: Yale University Press, 2007) ISBN 0-300-11714-0
- Eamon Duffy Fires of Faith: Catholic England under Mary Tudor (New Haven: Yale University Press, 2009) Excellent for background and policies of Cardinal Pole. ISBN 0-300-15216-7
- Eamon Duffy A People's Tragedy: Studies in Reformation (London: Bloomsbury Continuum, 2020) ISBN 978-1-4729-8385-5
- Mark Turnham Elvins, Old Catholic England (London: Catholic Truth Society, 1978)
- Antonia Fraser Mary Queen of Scots (New York: Delta Random, 1993) ISBN 978-0-385-31129-8
- Antonia Fraser Faith and Treason: The Story of the Gunpowder Plot (New York: Anchor Books, 1996) ISBN 0-385-47190-4
- Howard Esksine-Hill Alexander Pope: World and Word (Oxford: Oxford University Press for the British Academy, 1998) ISBN 0-19-726170-1
- Gabriel Glickman The English Catholic Community 1688–1745: Politics, Culture, and Ideology (Baydell Press, 2009) ISBN 978-1-843-83821-0
- Gordon-Gorman, William James. Converts to Rome: a biographical list of the more notable converts to the Catholic Church in the United Kingdom (1910) online.
- Greenblatt, Stephen. Will in the World (New York: W.W.Norton, 2004) ISBN 0-393-05057-2
- John Guy A Daughter's Love: Thomas and Margaret More (Boston: Houghton Mifflin Harcourt, 2009) 0618499156
- Alana Harris Faith in the Family: a lived religious history of English Catholicism, 1945–82 (Manchester: University of Manchester:2014)
- Roy Hattersley The Catholics (Chatto and Windus, 2017) NSBN-10: 178474152
- Clare Haynes Pictures and Popery: Art and Religion in England, 1660–1760 (Burlington, Vt.: Ashgate, 2006) ISBN 0-7546-5506-7
- Robert Hutchinson House of Treason: the Rise and Fall of the Tudor Dynasty (London: Weidenfeld and Nicolson, 2009) ISBN 0-297-84564-0
- Emilia Jamroziak and Janet Burton, eds. Religious and Laity in Western Europe, 1000–1400 (Europa Scra 2.Turnhout: Brepols, 2006)
- Julie Kerr Monastic Hospitality: Benedictines in England, c.1070-c.1250, Studies in the history of Medieval Religion 32. (Woodbridge, U.K.: Boydell, 2007) ISBN 1-84725-161-7
- K.J. Kesselring The Northern Rebellion of 1569: Faith, Politics, and Protest in Elizabethan England (London: Palgrave MacMillan, 2007) ISBN 978-0-230-55319-4
- Peter Lake and Michael Questier The Trials of Margaret Clitherow: Persecution, Martyrdom and the Politics of Sanctity in Elizabethan England (Bloomsbury, 2011)
- Peter Marshall Religious Identities in Henry VIII's England (London: Ashgate, 2006) ISBN 0-7546-5390-0
- Peter Marshall and Alex Ryrie, Eds The Beginnings of English Protestantism (Cambridge: Cambridge University Press, 2002) ISBN 978-0-521-80274-1
- Thomas McCoog And Touching Our Society: Jesuit Identity in Elizabethan England ISBN 978-0-88844-183-6
- Geoffrey Moorhouse The Pilgrimage of Grace: the Rebellion that Shook Henry VIII's Throne (London: Weidenfeld and Moorhouse, 2003) ISBN 978-1-84212-666-0
- Edward Norman The English Catholic Church in the Nineteenth Century (Oxford: Clarendon Press, 1985) ISBN 978-0-198-22955-1
- Hazel Pierce Margaret Pole, Countess of Salisbury 1473–1541: Loyalty, Lineage and Leadership (University of Wales Press, 2009) ISBN 0-7083-2189-5
- Linda Porter The First Queen of England: The Myth of "Bloody Mary" (New York: St. Martin Press, 2008) ISBN 0-312-36837-2
- Michael C. Questier Catholicism and Community in Early Modern England: Politics, Aristocratic Patronage and Religion, c. 1550–1640 Cambridge Studies in Early Modern British History (New York: Cambridge University Press, 2006). This re-evaluates post-Reformation Catholicism through windows of the wider Catholic community in England and through aristocratic patronage. ISBN 0-521-06880-0
- John Saward, John Morrill, and Michael Tomko (eds), Firmly I Believe and Truly: The spiritual tradition of Catholic England 1483–1999 (Oxford, Oxford University Press, 2011).
- Nicholas Schofield and Gerard Skinner The English Vicars Apostolic 1688-1850 (Family Publications, 2009) ISBN 978-1-907-38001-3
- Karen Stober Late Medieval Monasteries and their Patrons: England and Wales, c.1300–1540 Studies in the History of Medieval Religion. (Woodbridge, U.K.: Boydell, 2007) ISBN 1-84383-284-4
- Charles E. Ward The Life of John Dryden (Chapel Hill, North Carolina: University of North Carolina Press, 1961) ASIN B00IUBM07U
- James Anderson Winn John Dryden and His World (New Haven: Yale University Press, 1987) ISBN 978-0-300-02994-9
- Barbara Yorke The Conversion of Britain 600-800 (New York: Routledge, 2014) ISBN 978-0-582-77292-2
