= Giovanni Battista Piamarta =

Italian Roman Catholic saint (1841–1913)

Saint Giovanni Battista Piamarta
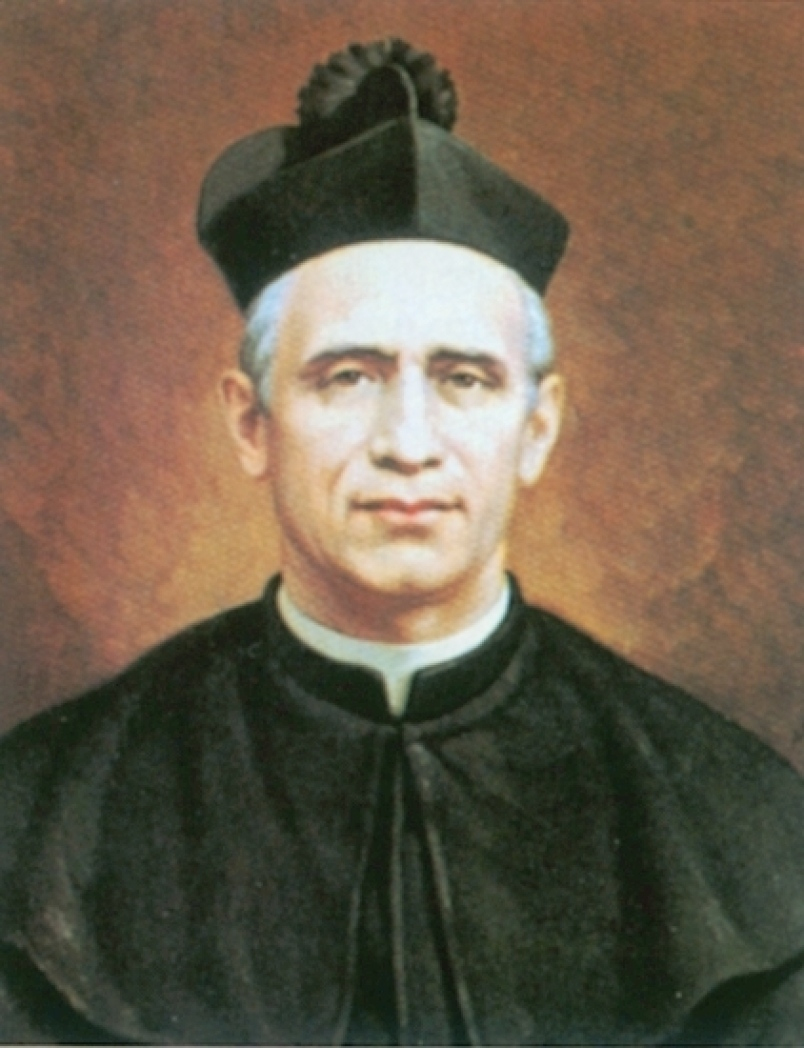

Priest
- Born: 26 November 1841; Brescia, Kingdom of Lombardy–Venetia
- Died: 25 April 1913 (aged 71); Remedello, Kingdom of Italy
- Venerated in: Roman Catholic Church
- Beatified: 12 October 1997, Saint Peter's Basilica, Vatican City by Pope John Paul II
- Canonized: 21 October 2012, Saint Peter's Square, Vatican City by Pope Benedict XVI
- Feast: 25 April
- Attributes: Rosary; Christogram; Crucifix
- Patronage: Congregation of the Holy Family of Nazareth; Humble Servants of the Lord

Giovanni Battista Piamarta (26 November 1841 - 25 April 1913) was an Italian Roman Catholic priest and educator. Piamarta was also the founder of the Congregation of the Holy Family of Nazareth. Piamarta established his congregation in 1900 in order to promote Christian education across the Italian peninsula. Piamarta also founded the Humble Servants of the Lord.

Piamarta was beatified on 12 October 1997 and was canonized as a saint of the Roman Catholic Church on 21 October 2012 in a celebration that Pope Benedict XVI presided over.

== Life ==
Giovanni Battista Piamarta was born in Brescia on 26 November 1841 into a poor household; his father was a barber. Piamarta lost his mother at the age of nine in 1850 and spent time living in the slums of the town. His maternal grandfather sent him to the Oratory of Saint Thomas. His adolescence was difficult but thanks to the parish of Vallio Terme he entered the diocesan seminary.

He was ordained to the priesthood on 23 December 1865 prior to Christmas and he began his pastoral mission in Carzago Riviera (Bedizzole), spending his first two decades in intense pastoral work, and is remembered as a priest "zealous, excellent, flawless in everything". In that time he was appointed as the priest (and later director) of the parish of Saint Alexander and later as the pastor of Pavone del Mella. Brescia was in the process of industrialization and Piamarta identified with the difficulties and hopes of disadvantaged adolescents due to his own experiences on the streets as a child.

In 1886 he returned to Brescia. With Pietro Capetti and the Catholic Movement he started the Institute Artigianelli for the vocational and Christian education of the poorest children and adolescents on 3 December 1886. The "Workman's Institute" grew in workspaces and buildings, making it possible for many adolescents to receive a technical education.

In 1889, he and Giovanni Bonsignori began the Agricultural Colony of Remedello. As a result, a number of religious who shared the ideals and labors of the mission gathered around Piamarta. In March 1900 he established the Congregation of the Holy Family of Nazareth ("Piamartinis") to continue the work of technical Christian education around the world. This would include Italy, Angola, Mozambique, Brazil and Chile. Piamarta's work with the Brescian printing and publishing house, "Queriniana", helped make Brescia a European center of Catholic publications.

=== Death and exhumation ===
Giovanni Battista Piamarta died on 25 April 1913 in Remedello after a life spent in the service of God and his fellow neighbors. In 1926 his remains were moved to the church of the workmen that he himself had built.

== Sainthood ==
=== Process and Venerable ===
The sanctification process commenced in the Diocese of Brescia in an informative process that had been tasked to compile documentation and evidence on Piamarta in terms of both his life and his works. His writings were also collated and received the approval of theologians who ascertained that Piamarta adhered to the tradition of the Catholic faith.

The cause opened on a formal level during the pontificate of Pope Pius XII on 26 February 1949 in which he was granted the posthumous title of Servant of God - the official first phase of the process.

Following this an apostolic process was also held in the diocese. Upon its conclusion the previous processes were submitted to Rome and were validated there at the discretion of the Congregation of Rites. The postulation then submitted the Positio to Roman officials for their own investigation in 1983. This led to Pope John Paul II proclaiming Piamarta to be Venerable on 22 March 1986 upon the recognition of his life of heroic virtue.

=== Beatification ===
The process for the miracle required for his beatification was held in the diocese of its origin and was later validated in Rome for assessment there. The medical board that advised the Congregation for the Causes of Saints approved the miracle on 27 June 1996 while collaborating theologians followed likewise on 6 December 1996. The C.C.S. also voiced their approval on 4 March 1997 leading to full papal approval on 8 April 1997 a month later.

On 12 October 1997 the beatification of Piamarta was celebrated in a celebration that Pope John Paul II presided over in Saint Peter's Basilica.

=== Canonization ===
The process for the miracle needed for Piamarta's sanctification was held in the place it originated in (spanning 15 June 2005 until 7 February 2006) and received full validation from the C.C.S. on 10 November 2006. The medical board granted approval to the healing on 20 December 2007 and theologians also came to the same assessment on 2 July 2011. The C.C.S. also granted assent on 18 October 2011 which paved a path for papal approval on 19 December 2011.

The canonization of Piamarta was held on 21 October 2012 in which Pope Benedict XVI proclaimed him as a saint for the Roman Catholic Church.

=== Feast ===
His memorial liturgical feast is celebrated on 26 April.

== See also ==
- List of Catholic saints
- List of saints canonized by Pope Benedict XVI
