= List of English cardinals =

This is a list of cardinals of the Catholic Church from England. It does not include cardinals of non-English national origin appointed to English ecclesiastical offices such as the cardinal protectors of England.

Dates in parentheses are the dates of elevation and death (or, in the case of Pope Adrian IV, the date of his election as pope). Cardinals of antipopes are listed in italics. Living cardinals are bolded.

Prior to the English Reformation, most English cardinals were non-bishops or Archbishop of Canterbury. Four were Archbishop of York. Since the re-establishment of the hierarchy of Roman Catholicism in England and Wales by Universalis Ecclesiae (1850), most have also been the Archbishop of Westminster. Every archbishop of Westminster has been created cardinal.

== 12th century ==
- Robert Pullen (1144–1146)
- Nicholas Breakspeare, elected Pope Adrian IV (1149–1154)

== 13th century ==
- Stephen Langton (1206–1228)
- Robert of Courçon (1212–1219)
- Robert Somercotes (1238–1241)
- John of Toledo (1244–1275)
- Robert Kilwardby (1278–1279)
- Hugh of Evesham (1281–1287)

== 14th century ==
- William of Macclesfield (1303), probably died before his promotion
- Walter of Winterburn (1304–1305)
- Thomas of Jorz (1305–1310)
- John of Thoresby (1361–1373)
- Simon Langham (1368–1376)
- William Courtenay (1378) elevated by Pope Urban VI, but declined
- Adam Easton (1381–1385 and again 1389–1397)

== 15th century ==
- Philip Repyngdon, elevated by Gregory XII in 1408 but declined the promotion
- Robert Hallam, elevated in 1411 by Antipope John XXIII but declined the promotion
- Thomas Langley, elevated in 1411 by Antipope John XXIII but declined the promotion
- Henry Beaufort (1426–1447)
- John Kemp (1439–1454)
- Thomas Bourchier (1467/73-1486)
- John Morton (1493–1500)

== 16th century ==
- Christopher Bainbridge (1511–1514)
- Thomas Wolsey (1515–1530)
- John Fisher (1535–1535)
- Reginald Pole (1536–1558)
- William Petow (1557–1559)
- William Allen (1587–1594)

== 17th century ==
- Philip Howard (1675–1694)

== 18th century ==
- Henry Benedict Stuart (1747–1807)

== 19th century ==
- Thomas Weld (1830–1837)
- Charles Januarius Acton (1842–1847)
- Nicholas Wiseman (1850–1865)
- Henry Edward Manning (1875–1892)
- Edward Henry Howard (1877–1892)
- John Henry Newman (1879–1890)
- Herbert Vaughan (1893–1903)

== 20th century ==
- Francis Bourne (1911–1935)
- Francis Aidan Gasquet (1914–1929)
- Arthur Hinsley (1937–1943)
- Bernard Griffin (1946–1956)
- William Godfrey (1958–1963)
- William Theodore Heard (1959–1973)
- John Carmel Heenan (1965–1975)
- Basil Hume (1976–1999)

== 21st century ==
- Cormac Murphy-O'Connor (2001–2017)
- **Vincent Nichols** (2014–present)
- **Michael Fitzgerald** (2019–present)
- **Arthur Roche** (2022–present)
- **Timothy Radcliffe** (2024–present)
