= Congregation of the Holy Family of Nazareth =

- Congregation of the Holy Family of Nazareth of Blessed Father Piamarta
- Abbreviation: FN
- Formation: 1900 (126 years ago)
- Founder: Giovanni Battista Piamarta
- Type: Clerical religious congregation of pontifical right (for men)
- Headquarters: Via Enrico Ferri 91, Brescia, Italy
- Members: 128 members (92 priests) (2018)
- Superior General: Benedetto Picca, FN
- Parent organization: Catholic Church
- Website: piamarta.org

The Piamartini, officially known as the Congregation of the Holy Family of Nazareth of Blessed Father Piamarta (Italian: Congregazione della Sacra Famiglia di Nazareth del San Padre Piamarta; abbreviated FN) is a Catholic clerical religious congregation of pontifical right for men.

== History ==
The institute was founded by Italian priest Saint Giovanni Battista Piamarta, parish priest to Brescia. He was always sensitive to the problems of young people of the working class and opened agricultural and craft schools for them.

In 1900 this gave birth to a new congregation of priests who devote themselves to the care of children of the people, especially those without families, caring and professional education. The Holy See approved the establishment by Decree of January 10, 1948.

== Activities and dissemination ==
The Piamartini are a community of priests consecrated to God, as well as laity who are dedicated to training young people to Christian life through socialization and work. Their motto is "Pietas et Labor" (Piety and Labour).

The Congregation is present in Italy, Brazil, Angola and Chile. As of December 31, 2005, the congregation had 23 houses and 137 religious, 93 of them priests.

== Other foundations ==
Over the years the congregation has added others that support the activities of the Piamartini:

- Piamarta Onlus Foundation, which has a support those working in education;
- Operation Good, an association that collects aid for the mission Fortaleza/Pacotí, and in particular through distance adoptions;
- Service Collaboration International Assistance Piamartino Foundation, is an NGO (non-governmental organization) which aims to "promote and manage useful cooperation to promote human progress, economic and social integration of developing countries";
- Piamartino Secular Movement, born from the desire of some laity to share the spiritual experience of the Congregation, maintaining, however, the commitment to the active life. The movement provides participation through three stages: Accession, promises and votes (poverty, chastity, obedience).
- Piamartino Youth Movement, which brings together young people who want to live the values proposed by Piamarta: prayer, commitment at work, and a positive social openness.

== Sources ==
This article originated as a translation of it:Congregazione della Sacra Famiglia di Nazareth, its counterpart in the Italian Wikipedia
