= Sexual abuse scandal in the Roman Catholic Diocese of Arundel and Brighton =

Sexual abuse cases in the United Kingdom

The sexual abuse scandal in Arundel and Brighton diocese was an episode in the series of Catholic sex abuse cases in various Western countries.

== Michael Hill affair ==
In 2000, Archbishop Cormac Murphy-O'Connor found himself subject to public scrutiny regarding a priest in his diocese when he was Bishop of Arundel and Brighton. During this time it was brought to his attention that a priest, Michael Hill, was a child sexual abuser.

Instead of reporting Hill to the police, Murphy-O'Connor allowed the crime to be covered up and transferred Hill to Gatwick Airport chapel, where the Cardinal believed he would not be able to molest children. In 1997, Hill was convicted as a child molester and jailed for sexually assaulting nine children. After three years in jail, Hill was given another five years for assaulting three other boys.

== Christopher Maxwell-Stewart affair ==
In 2002, Bishop Kieran Conry, the next ordinary of Arundel and Brighton, told The Times that the case of Father Christopher Maxwell-Stewart had not been managed in ways deemed suitable by today's standards.

== Tim Garrett affair ==
In an interview with The Daily Telegraph, Murphy-O'Connor admitted he would have handled cases differently if existing guidelines were available during the 1980s. He said he might not have allowed Father Tim Garrett, convicted of taking indecent photographs of boys during this time, to move from Portsmouth diocese to Arundel and Brighton.

In 2000, when Murphy-O'Connor became the Archbishop of Westminster, the case became known to the general public.
