= St Dunstan's Church, Woking =

Coordinates: 51.3192°N 0.5453°W

St Dunstan's Church
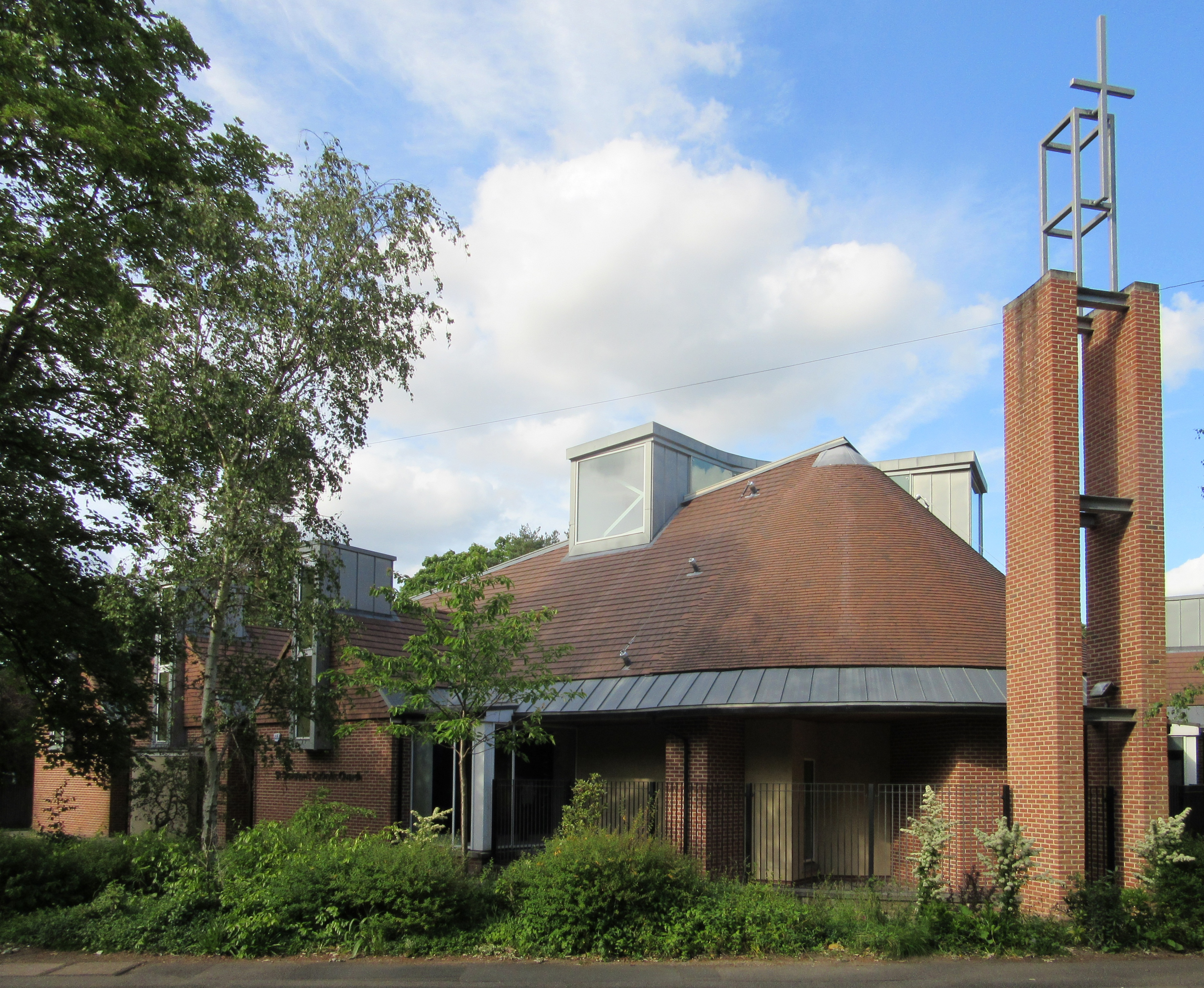
- The church from the southwest

- Location in Surrey
- Location: Shaftesbury Road, Woking, Surrey
- Country: England
- Denomination: Roman Catholic
- Website: St-Dunstans.org

History
- Status: Active
- Dedication: Dunstan
- Dedicated: 22 October 2008

Architecture
- Functional status: Parish church
- Completed: 8 August 2008

Administration
- Province: Southwark
- Diocese: Arundel and Brighton
- Deanery: Woking

St Dunstan's Church is a Roman Catholic Parish church in Woking, Surrey. At first it was built in 1899, replaced by a larger church in 1923 and its final form was built in 2008. The church was dedicated that year by the Bishop of Arundel and Brighton and Cardinal Cormac Murphy-O'Connor. It is set back in its own plot from Shaftesbury and Pembroke Roads within a mile of the town's centre. It is the only Catholic church in the town and is the centre of the deanery of Woking in the Diocese of Arundel and Brighton.

== History ==
=== Percy Street ===
In 1850, there was the Restoration of the English Catholic hierarchy. However, there was no place of worship for Catholics in Woking. Instead, Catholics travelled to Send or to St Edward the Confessor Church in Sutton Green to celebrate Mass.

In 1899, a Fr W. D. Allanson built an iron church in Percy Street, Woking, dedicated to St Dunstan.

=== White Rose Lane/Heathside Crescent ===
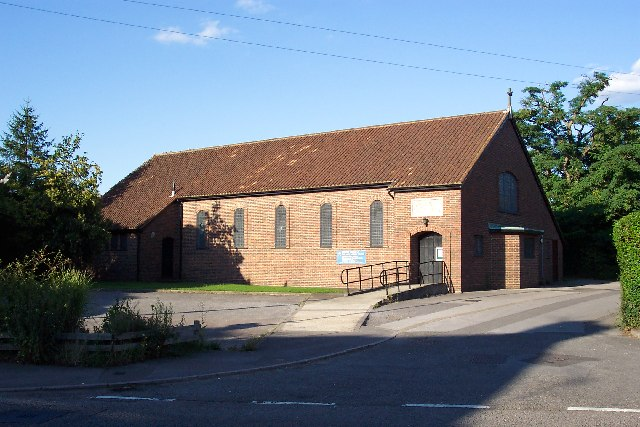
Our Lady Mother of God Church, Kingfield, built in 1962 and demolished when the new St Dunstan's was built.

In 1923, a Fr. Plummer replaced a Fr. John Peall as parish priest and wanted a new church to be built in the Gothic Revival style. Plans were soon drawn up and on 26 April 1925, Bishop William Brown, Auxiliary Bishop of Southwark and Titular Bishop of Pella laid the foundation stone at the new site on the corner of White Rose Lane and Heathside Crescent. The church was designed by Joseph Goldie. It was completed on 8 December that year. In 1954, Fr Plummer died and was buried in the grounds of the church.

The church congregation grew during the 20th century so that other Catholic churches had to be established in the surrounding area. St Hugh's Church in Knaphill was opened in 1907, Our Lady Help of Christians Church in West Byfleet in 1954 and Our Lady Mother of God Church in the Kingfield area of Woking in 1962.

After the Second World War, many Italian immigrants came to work in Woking. In 1973, Masses in Italian were held on Sunday for the community. In 1953, the first parish school was opened, then in 1958 St Dunstan's School was opened and then St Francis School in 1973. In 1993, they were combined to form St Dunstan's Primary School.

=== Shaftesbury Road ===
When St Francis School was closed, its site on Shaftesbury Road was not sold, but retained. In 2003, the decision was made to develop the site to build a new church that would replace the Our Lady Mother of God church and St Dunstan's on Heathside Crescent.

In 2006, construction work began. In March 2006, the church of Our Lady Mother of God in Kingfield was closed in anticipation of the new church being built. On 13 July 2006, as part of the redevelopment of parish facilities, Bishop Kieran Conry moved the remains of Fr Plummer to St Edward the Confessor Church in Sutton Green.

On 8 August 2008, the building was completed and the first Mass was celebrated the next day. The new church was dedicated on 22 October 2008 by the Bishop of Arundel and Brighton, Kieran Conry and Cardinal Cormac Murphy – O'Connor.

The old St Dunstan's church in White Rose Lane was demolished in 2009 and the land lay empty for several years. A residential development containing 147 flats and commercial space was constructed on the land and completed in February 2020. The development was named Harrington Place after Canon Frank Harrington, the parish priest at St Dunstan's from 1994 until his death in 2018.

== Parish ==
The church has a close relationship with St. Dunstan's Primary School.

The church has five Sunday Masses every week, 6:00pm on Saturday evening (for Sunday), 9:00am, 10:30am Sunday morning, an Italian Mass at 12 noon and a Sunday evening Mass at 5:30pm. There are weekday Masses from Monday to Saturday at 10:00am and weekly Masses in Ukrainian (Saturday at 3.30pm) and Portuguese (Saturday at 7.45pm).

In September 2013, John Lillis, a former choirmaster and organist at the church, was jailed for six years after being found guilty of attempted buggery and two counts of indecent assault against boys under the age of 16. In November 2013 his sentence was increased to eight years. Lillis had previously pleaded guilty to four other counts of indecent assault committed between 1973 and 1982. He had been a music teacher at St. Dunstan's School during those years.

== See also ==
- Woking
- Diocese of Arundel and Brighton
- St Peter's Church, Old Woking
