= Bernard Longley =

English Catholic archbishop (born 1955)

The Most Reverend Bernard Longley
- Archbishop of Birmingham; Vice President of the Catholic Bishops’ Conference of England and Wales
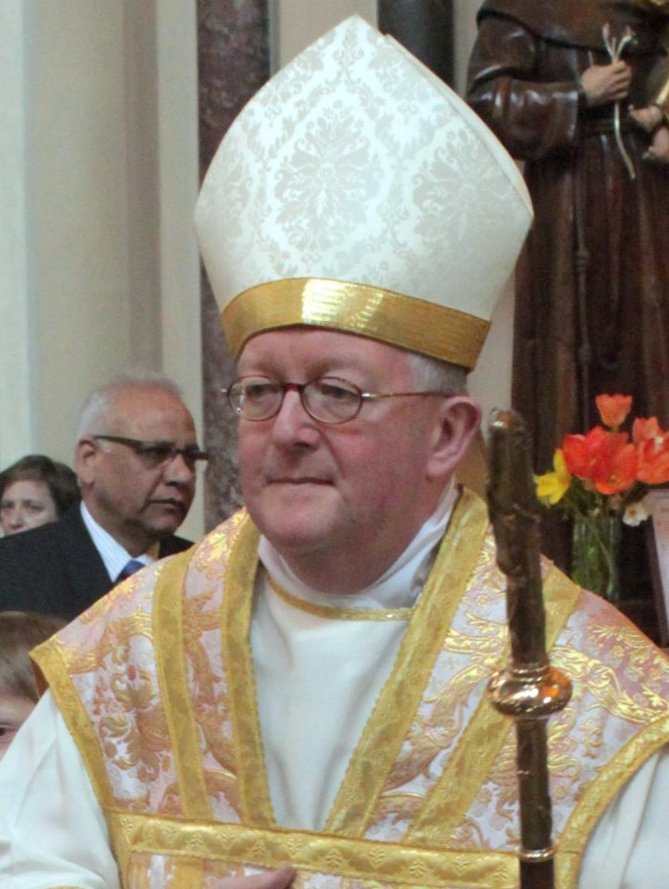
- Longley in the Oxford Oratory, 2010
- Church: Roman Catholic Church
- Archdiocese: Birmingham
- Province: Birmingham
- Appointed: 1 October 2009
- Installed: 8 December 2009
- Predecessor: Vincent Nichols
- Previous posts: Titular Bishop of Zarna (2003–2009); Auxiliary Bishop of Westminster (2003–2009)

Orders
- Ordination: 12 December 1981 by Cormac Murphy-O'Connor
- Consecration: 24 January 2003 by Cormac Murphy-O'Connor

Personal details
- Born: 5 April 1955 (age 71) Manchester, England
- Denomination: Roman Catholic
- Education: Xaverian College; Royal Northern College of Music; New College, Oxford
- Motto: Ut unum sint (English: That they all may be one)
- Coat of arms: Bernard Longley's coat of arms

Styles of Bernard Longley
- Reference style: The Most Reverend
- Spoken style: Your Grace
- Religious style: Archbishop

Ordination history of Bernard Longley
History
Priestly ordination
- Ordained by: Cormac Murphy-O'Connor (Arun. & Brig.)
Episcopal consecration
- Principal consecrator: Cormac Murphy-O'Connor (Westminster)
- Co-consecrators: Arthur Roche (Leeds coad.); Kieran Conry (Arun. & Brig.)
Episcopal succession
Bishops consecrated by Bernard Longley as principal consecrator
- Robert Byrne: 13 May 2014
- David Evans: 9 October 2020
- Stephen Wright: 9 October 2020

Bernard Longley KC*HS (born 5 April 1955) is an English prelate of the Roman Catholic Church. He was named the Archbishop of Birmingham on 1 October 2009, and installed on 8 December 2009.

== Early life and ministry ==
Bernard Longley was born in Openshaw, Manchester, and was educated at St Vincent de Paul parish school, then at Xaverian College in Rusholme. He later studied at the Royal Northern College of Music and New College, Oxford, where he served as Treasurer of the Oxford Union in 1977. He then was in formation for the priesthood at St John's Seminary, Wonersh where he was ordained a priest for the Diocese of Arundel and Brighton on 12 December 1981. He then served as an assistant priest at St. Joseph's Church in Epsom and as a chaplain to psychiatric hospitals.

Longley became Surrey Chairman of Diocesan Commission for Christian Unity in 1991, and National Ecumenical Officer at the Catholic Bishops' Conference of England and Wales in 1996. From 1987 to 1996, he taught dogmatic theology at St. John's Seminary in Wonersh. In 1999, he was named Moderator of the Steering Committee of Churches Together in Britain and Ireland, as well as Assistant General Secretary of Catholic Bishops' Conference with responsibilities for Ecumenism and Interfaith Affairs.

== Episcopal career ==
=== Auxiliary Bishop of Westminster ===
On 4 January 2003, Longley was appointed Auxiliary Bishop of Westminster and Titular Bishop of Zarna by Pope John Paul II. He commented that he was "greatly honoured" and "very much overwhelmed" by his appointment. He received his episcopal consecration on the following 24 January from Cardinal Cormac Murphy-O'Connor of Westminster (who had ordained Longley priest 22 years earlier), with Coadjutor Bishop Arthur Roche of Leeds and Bishop Kieran Conry of Arundel and Brighton (Cardinal Murphy-O'Connor's successor in that see) serving as co-consecrators.

In 2007, Longley played a prominent role in the integration of the independent Soho Masses Pastoral Council, a group that sponsors Masses for homosexual Catholics, into the Archdiocese. The Bishop helped to form an agreement that moved the group's liturgies from an Anglican parish to a Catholic church (the Church of Our Lady of the Assumption and St Gregory), as well as a statement on ministry to homosexual Catholics that, while following Catholic teaching on homosexuality, underscored that "the Church's pastoral outreach recognises that baptised persons with a homosexual inclination continue to look to the Church for a place where they might live in authentic human integrity and holiness of life." In a BBC interview, Longley said that "it's never been the practice of the Catholic Church, as it were, to 'means-test' people before admitting them to the celebration of the Eucharist. It would be a mistake to jump to conclusions or to generalise about anybody's particular lifestyle, or their state of grace."

Longley was the head of the Diocesan Pastoral Board and had oversight of Central and East London, i.e. the Deaneries of Camden, Hackney, Islington, Marylebone, Tower Hamlets, and Westminster. He is considered to be a conservative who is "friendly" to the traditional Latin Mass, but also a "born diplomat." His name was mentioned as a possible Archbishop of Westminster, often considered to be the 'head' of the Church in England and Wales, succeeding Cardinal Murphy-O'Connor, but the position ultimately went to Vincent Nichols.

=== Archbishop of Birmingham ===
On 1 October 2009, Pope Benedict XVI appointed Bishop Longley as the Archbishop of Birmingham. He succeeded Vincent Nichols, who was translated from Birmingham to Westminster earlier in 2009. Longley was installed at St Chad's Cathedral on 8 December 2009, the feast of the Immaculate Conception. Before the ceremony, Longley spoke of how much he was looking forward to joining both the Catholic and wider Christian communities in the Midlands and contributing to their work. Longley played a leading role in the plans for the beatification of Cardinal John Henry Newman and presented the petition for canonisation to Pope Benedict XVI, which took place in Cofton Park, Birmingham on 19 September 2010 during Benedict's papal visit to the United Kingdom in September 2010.

On 5 January 2011, Longley was appointed among the first members of the newly created Pontifical Council for the Promotion of the New Evangelisation.

Longley is also co-chair of Anglican–Roman Catholic International Commission and has previously served as moderator of the Steering Committee of Churches Together in Britain and Ireland, as well as assistant general secretary of Catholic Bishops' Conference of England and Wales with responsibilities for ecumenism and interfaith affairs.

On 18 September 2012, Pope Benedict XVI named Longley to serve as one of the Synod Fathers for the October 2012 13th Ordinary General Assembly of the Synod of Bishops on the New Evangelization. In May 2025, Longley was elected vice president of the Catholic Bishops' Conference of England and Wales following the retirement of Malcolm McMahon. In July 2025, Longley was appointed by Pope Leo XIV to two Vatican Dicasteries; the Dicastery for Interreligious Dialogue and the Dicastery for Promoting Christian Unity.

Catholic Church titles
Preceded by —	Auxiliary Bishop of Westminster; 2003–2009	Succeeded by —
Preceded by Vincent Nichols	Archbishop of Birmingham; 2009–present	Incumbent
Preceded by Licínio Rangel	— TITULAR — Bishop of Zarna; 2003–2009	Succeeded by Francisco Antonio Ceballos Escobar
