= Stephen Wang (bishop) =

English Catholic prelate (born 1966)

The Right Reverend Stephen Wang
- Bishop of Arundel and Brighton
- Church: Catholic Church
- Province: Southwark
- Diocese: Arundel and Brighton
- Appointed: 2 July 2026
- Installed: 19 October 2026
- Predecessor: Richard Moth
- Previous post: Rector, Venerable English College (2021–2026)

Orders
- Ordination: 3 January 1998 by Basil Hume
- Consecration: 19 October 2026 by John Wilson

Personal details
- Born: 8 November 1966 (age 59) London, England
- Motto: Veritas in caritate (Latin for 'Truth in love')

Stephen Wei-Jon Wang (born 8 November 1966) is an English Catholic prelate serving as Bishop of Arundel and Brighton since 2026.

== Early life and education ==
Stephen Wei-Jon Wang was born on 8 November 1966 in Bloomsbury, London. He is the son of Kin and Elizabeth Wang, both converts from Anglicanism to Catholicism. He is of Chinese descent through his father, and of English and Scottish descent through his mother.

Wang attended the University of Cambridge from 1986 to 1989, earning a Bachelor's degree in Theology and Religious Studies. He then studied for the priesthood in Rome from 1992 to 1997, earning a Licentiate in Philosophy from the Venerable English College and a Licentiate in Fundamental Theology from the Pontifical Gregorian University.

== Priesthood ==
On 3 January 1998, Wang was ordained a priest by Cardinal Basil Hume at Our Lady of Lourdes Church in Harpenden. He then served as a parochial vicar in Dollis Hill (1998–2001) before pursuing his doctoral studies at Cambridge, where he also assisted at Fisher House.

Wang lectured in Philosophy and Theology at Allen Hall Seminary from 2005 to 2013, also serving as Dean of Studies (2009–2013). From 2013 to 2021, he served as Senior University Chaplain for the Archdiocese of Westminster and Catholic Chaplain at the London School of Economics. He then served as rector of the Venerable English College in Rome from 2021 to 2026.

== Episcopate ==
Following the appointment of Richard Moth as Archbishop of Westminster, Wang was appointed Bishop of Arundel and Brighton by Pope Leo XIV on 2 July 2026. He was ordained a bishop on 19 October 2026 at Arundel Cathedral by Archbishop John Wilson of Southwark with Moth and Cardinal Vincent Nichols of Westminster as co-consecrators.
