= Hospital of St John and St Elizabeth =

- Roman Catholic affiliation
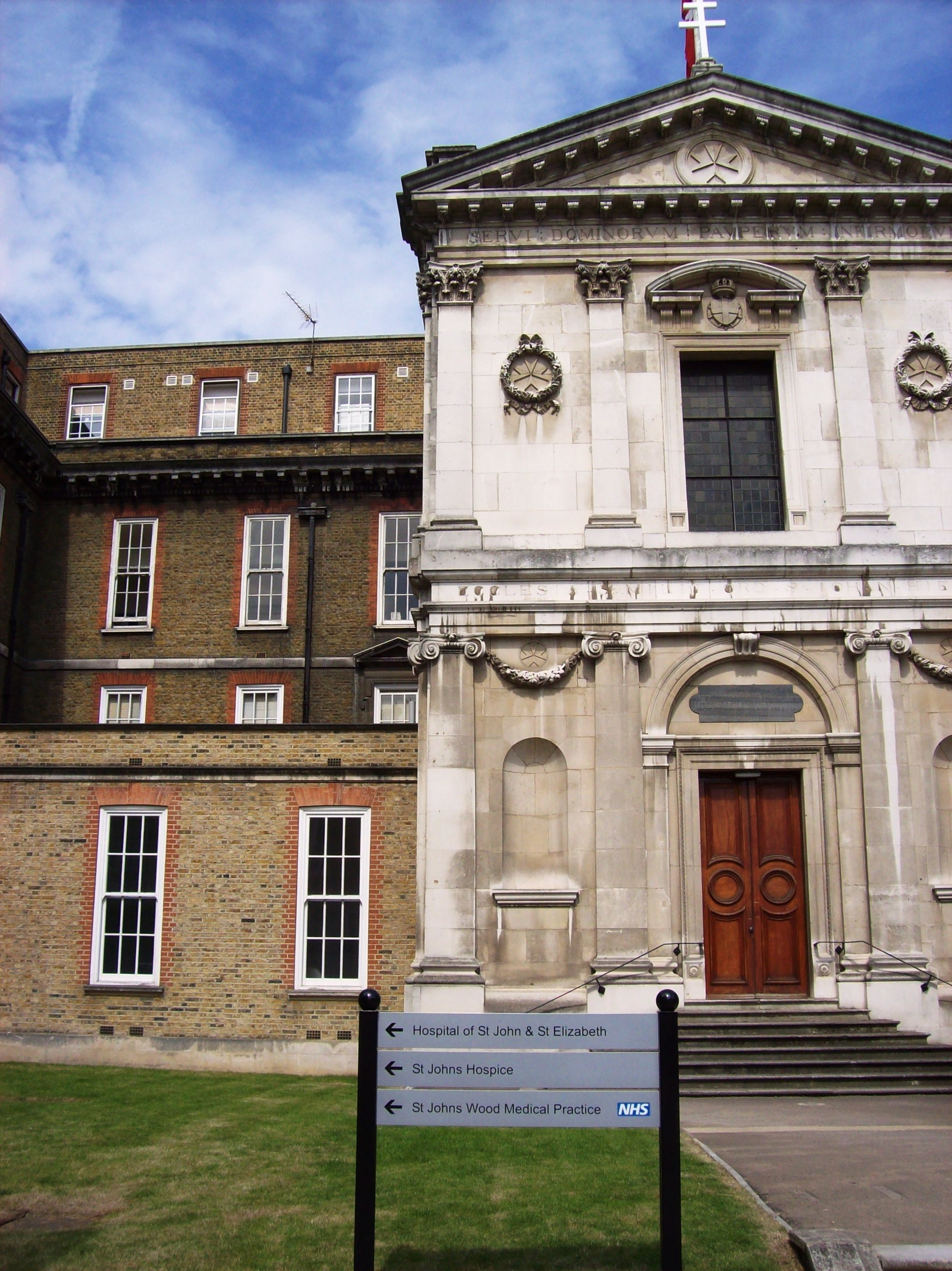
- Hospital of St John and St Elizabeth

Geography
- Location: London, NW8, United Kingdom
- Coordinates: 51°31′58″N 0°10′27″W

Organisation
- Care system: Private
- Type: Charitable hospital

Services
- Emergency department: Urgent care centre
- Beds: 70+

History
- Founded: 1856; 170 years ago

Links
- Website: hje.org.uk
- Lists: Hospitals in the United Kingdom

The Hospital of St John and St Elizabeth, commonly known as St John & St Elizabeth Hospital, is a Catholic private hospital in St John's Wood, London, England.

== History and operations ==
The hospital was founded in 1856 with a Roman Catholic affiliation and is a registered charity. It was founded as the "Hospital of St Elizabeth" by the Duke of Norfolk. Originally located in Great Ormond Street, London, by the end of the 19th century it had relocated to St John's Wood and adopted its present name. The chapel which once stood on Great Ormond Street was moved brick-by-brick to its new site at the Hospital in St John's Wood.

At its founding, the hospital was entrusted to the care of the Sisters of Mercy, whose stewardship would continue for many decades to come; more recently, however, the Sisters of Mercy have withdrawn from the management of the hospital, and it is now under lay control. The hospital closed temporarily in 1866 due to a lack of funds, but later reopened. The hospital was vital during the war effort of both the First and Second World Wars, being used by the War Office to treat injured military personnel.

The hospital came to media attention in late 2007 when two board members resigned in protest after a new code of ethics, issued by Cormac Cardinal Murphy-O'Connor, Archbishop of Westminster, was accepted by the board. The new code "bars doctors from offering any service which conflicts with Catholic teaching" including "sex-change operations, providing contraception, abortion referrals and IVF treatment". Later in 2008, the Cardinal ordered the resignation of the remaining board members and installed Lord Guthrie of Craigiebank as chairman. It was reported that Jacob Rees-Mogg had resigned but Aida Hersham did not.

Simon James has been CEO of St John & St Elizabeth Hospital since August 2023.

== Facilities ==
The hospital's facilities include five operating theatres, and en-suite bathrooms in all of the patients' rooms. It is also the home to British Athletics, which established its medical headquarters at the Hospital to care for track and field athletes. The hospital employs over 600 doctors. It also has an on-site urgent care clinic available for walk-in appointments for minor injuries and illnesses.

St Andrew's Ward, a new £2.1 million 10-bed stroke and medical ward, opened in July 2016, bringing the total number of beds to over 70.

In 2021, the hospital opened a new wing, which is home to operating theatres, private patient rooms, a new Imaging Department and an expanded walk-in Urgent Care Clinic^{[1]}. The new wing was the biggest extension to the hospital since it opened in St John’s Wood.

In October 2023, St John & St Elizabeth Hospital started offering Aquablation Therapy for benign prostate enlargement (BPE).

St Joseph's Ward was transformed into a recovery ward for paediatric day case surgery in Spring 2025.

== Relationship with St John's Hospice ==
The hospital gains its charitable status as its profits help fund an on-site hospice, St John's. Each year, St John's Hospice provides free, palliative and end-of-life care to over 4,000 people.

While based within the hospital, the hospice's support extends across Brent, Camden, Hammersmith & Fulham, Harrow, Islington, Kensington & Chelsea, and Westminster.

In addition to inpatient care, it offers community-based services, social and welfare support, bereavement counselling, and day services through its Wellbeing Centre, which opened in 2024. It is the only London hospice to provide 24/7 Hospice@Home care and to operate its own dedicated ambulance service.

== See also ==
- List of hospitals in England
