= David Cashman =

English prelate (1912-1971)

The Right Reverend David John Cashman
- Bishop of Arundel and Brighton
- Church: Roman Catholic Church
- Province: Westminster
- Diocese: Arundel and Brighton
- Appointed: 14 June 1965
- Term ended: 14 March 1971
- Successor: Michael George Bowen
- Previous posts: Auxiliary Bishop of Westminster; Titular Bishop of Cantanus

Orders
- Ordination: 24 December 1938
- Consecration: 27 May 1958 by William Godfrey

Personal details
- Born: 27 December 1912 Bristol, England
- Died: 14 March 1971 (aged 58)
- Denomination: Roman Catholic

David John Cashman (1912–1971) was an English prelate of the Roman Catholic Church. He served as Bishop of Arundel and Brighton from 1965 to 1971.

== Early life and ministry ==
Born in Bristol on 27 December 1912, he was educated at Cotton College, Staffordshire and the English College, Rome. He was ordained to the priesthood on 24 December 1938, and began his career at St Mary and Angels, Stoke on Trent, followed by as Chaplain to the Duke of Norfolk, and later Parish Priest of St Mary's Church, Cadogan Street, Chelsea, London.

== Episcopal career ==
He was appointed an Auxiliary Bishop of Westminster and Titular Bishop of Cantanus on 25 March 1958. His consecration to the Episcopate took place on 27 May 1958, the principal consecrator was Cardinal William Godfrey, Archbishop of Westminster and the principal co-consecrators were Cyril Conrad Cowderoy, Bishop (later Archbishop) of Southwark and George Laurence Craven, Auxiliary Bishop of Westminster.

Cashman was appointed Bishop of the Diocese of Arundel and Brighton on 14 June 1965. He attended all the four sessions of the Second Vatican Council, held between in 1962 and 1965.

He died in office on 14 March 1971, aged 58. There is a memorial to him within Arundel Cathedral.

Catholic Church titles
New title	Bishop of Arundel and Brighton; 1965–1971	Succeeded by Michael George Bowen
