= Stephen Wang =

Stephen Wang may refer to:

- Stephen Wang (bishop), Roman Catholic bishop in England
- Stephen Wang, one of the founders of Rotten Tomatoes film review website
