= Richard Moth =

English Catholic prelate (born 1958)

The Most Reverend Richard Moth
- Archbishop of Westminster
- Church: Catholic Church
- Province: Westminster
- Diocese: Westminster
- Appointed: 19 December 2025
- Installed: 14 February 2026
- Predecessor: Vincent Nichols
- Other posts: President of the Catholic Bishops' Conference of England and Wales (2026–present); Apostolic Administrator of Northampton sede plena et ad nutum Sanctae Sedis (2026)
- Previous posts: Bishop of Arundel and Brighton (2015–2025); Bishop of the Forces (2009–2015)

Orders
- Ordination: 3 July 1982 by Michael George Bowen
- Consecration: 29 September 2009 by Kevin John Patrick McDonald

Personal details
- Born: Charles Phillip Richard Moth; 8 July 1958 (age 68) Chingola, Federation of Rhodesia and Nyasaland (now Zambia)
- Denomination: Catholic
- Parents: Charles and Barbara Moth
- Motto: Pax et gaudium in Domino (Latin for 'Peace and joy in the Lord')
- Styles
- Reference style: The Most Reverend
- Spoken style: Your Grace
- Religious style: Archbishop

Charles Phillip Richard Moth (born 8 July 1958) is an English Catholic prelate serving as Archbishop of Westminster since 2026.

He previously served as vicar general of the Archdiocese of Southwark from 2001 to 2009, Bishop of the Forces from 2009 to 2015, and Bishop of Arundel and Brighton from 2015 to 2025.

Patron of the Catholic Union of Great Britain since 2026.

== Early life ==
Charles Phillip Richard Moth was born in 1958 in Chingola, Northern Rhodesia (now Zambia), and emigrated to the United Kingdom at the age of two. He was educated at The Judd School in Tonbridge, Kent. He trained for the priesthood at St John's Seminary, Wonersh. He later studied at Saint Paul University, Ottawa, graduating with Master of Arts (MA) and Licentiate of Canon Law (JCL) degree in 1987.

== Ordained ministry ==
=== Priesthood ===
Moth was ordained to the priesthood on 3 July 1982. He served as Curate at St Bede's, Clapham Park and as a judge at the Southwark Metropolitan Tribunal before being sent to do further study in Ottawa, gaining a Licentiate and then a Master's in Canon Law. In 1987 he returned to Southwark and was curate at St Saviour's, Lewisham. During this time, he was also a Territorial Army chaplain, serving with 217 General Hospital Royal Army Medical Corps (V). He was commissioned in the Royal Army Chaplains' Department as Chaplain to the Forces 4th Class (equivalent in rank to captain) on 26 April 1988. He ended his service on 12 July 1993, with his commission transferring to the Regular Army Reserve of Officers.

In 1992, Archbishop Michael Bowen named him as his private secretary and master of ceremonies, serving concurrently as vocations director and vice-chancellor of the Diocese. Moth was named a Monsignor to the degree of Chaplain of His Holiness in 1998. In 2001, upon the elevation of the Vicar General, Mgr Canon John Hine, to be an Auxiliary Bishop of Southwark, Moth was named vicar general and chancellor of the Archdiocese. With this new post, he was promoted to be a Prelate of Honour. He was also a parish priest, serving as parish administrator of Holy Cross Church, Plumstead from 2003 and then as parish administrator of Saint Joseph's Church, Saint Mary Cray from 2006.

=== Episcopate ===
In July 2009, Moth was appointed Bishop of the Forces by Pope Benedict XVI. He stepped down as vicar general of Southwark and was succeeded in that role by Mgr. Matthew Dickens in September 2009. He was consecrated as a bishop on 29 September 2009 in Westminster Cathedral; Archbishop Kevin McDonald was principal consecrator, with Archbishop Michael Bowen and Bishop Tom Burns as principal co-consecrators. Archbishop Vincent Nichols and Cardinals Cormac Murphy-O'Connor and Keith O'Brien were also present in choir. His time as Bishop of the Forces ended in 2015 when he was translated to a different see.

On 21 March 2015, Moth was announced as the next Bishop of Arundel and Brighton, having been appointed by Pope Francis. He was installed on 28 May 2015. In 2017, he was made a Canon of Honour of the Anglican Chichester Cathedral.

On 19 December 2025, he was appointed Archbishop of Westminster by Pope Leo XIV. He was installed as archbishop in Westminster Cathedral on 14 February 2026. In April 2026, he was elected as the next president of the Catholic Bishops' Conference of England and Wales. In June 2026, following the arrest of David Oakley for sexual offences, Moth was appointed by Pope Leo XIV as apostolic administrator of the Diocese of Northampton sede plena et ad nutum Sanctæ Sedis (while the see is occupied and at the discretion of the Holy See).

Catholic Church titles
Preceded by Tom Burns	Bishop of the Forces; 2009 – 2015	Succeeded by Paul James Mason
Preceded by Kieran Conry	Bishop of Arundel and Brighton; 2015 – 2025	Succeeded by Vacant
Preceded by Vincent Nichols	Archbishop of Westminster; 2026–present	Incumbent
Preceded by Vincent Nichols	President of Bishops' Conference of England and Wales; 2026–present	Incumbent
