= Michael Bowen (bishop) =

British prelate (1930–2019)

The Most Reverend Michael Bowen
- Archbishop of Southwark
- Archdiocese: Southwark
- See: Southwark
- Appointed: 28 March 1977
- Term ended: 6 November 2003
- Predecessor: Cyril Conrad Cowderoy
- Successor: Kevin John Patrick McDonald
- Previous posts: Coadjutor Bishop of Arundel and Brighton (1970–1971); Titular Bishop of Lamsorti (1970–1971); Bishop of Arundel and Brighton (1971–1977)

Orders
- Ordination: 6 July 1958 by Luigi Traglia
- Consecration: 27 June 1970 by Domenico Enrici

Personal details
- Born: Michael George Bowen; 23 April 1930 Gibraltar
- Died: 17 October 2019 (aged 89) Vauxhall, Central London, England
- Denomination: Roman Catholic

Styles of Michael Bowen
- Reference style: The Most Reverend
- Spoken style: His Grace
- Religious style: Monsignor

Michael George Bowen (23 April 1930 – 17 October 2019) was a British prelate of the Roman Catholic Church. He served as Archbishop of Southwark from 1977 to 2003, having previously served as Bishop of Arundel and Brighton.

== Life and ministry ==
Michael Bowen was born in Gibraltar on 23 April 1930 and was a wine merchant before being ordained to the priesthood on 6 July 1958. On 18 May 1970 he was appointed Coadjutor Bishop of Arundel and Brighton and Titular Bishop of Lamsorti by Pope Paul VI. Bowen received his episcopal consecration on the following 27 June from Archbishop Domenico Enrici with bishops David Cashman and Derek Worlock serving as co-consecrators.

Bowen succeeded the late David Cashman as Bishop of Arundel and Brighton on 14 March 1971. Bowen was later named Archbishop of Southwark on 28 March 1977. He resigned this post, after 26 years of service, on 6 November 2003. Following the announcement of his resignation, Cardinal Cormac Murphy-O'Connor said,

Archbishop Michael Bowen enters a well earned retirement after many years of faithful and joyous service on behalf of the Church ... He has been a true teacher and guide to his flock, a man who has led with certainty and humility, and served well the people and priests of his Archdiocese.

Bowen died on 17 October 2019, aged 89.

Catholic Church titles
Preceded by David Cashman	Bishop of Arundel and Brighton; 1971–1977	Succeeded by Cormac Murphy-O'Connor
Preceded by Cyril Cowderoy	Archbishop of Southwark; 1977–2003	Succeeded by Kevin McDonald
