= Catholic Bishops' Conference of England and Wales =

Permanent assembly of the Catholic Church

- Cynhadledd Esgobion Catholig Cymru a Lloegr (in Welsh)
- Logo

- Coat of Arms
- Abbreviation: CBCEW
- Region served: England and Wales
- Members: Active and retired Catholic bishops of England and Wales
- Main organ: Conference
- Website: www.cbcew.org.uk

The Catholic Bishops' Conference of England and Wales (CBCEW) is the episcopal conference of the Catholic Church in England and Wales.

== Overview ==
The Catholic Bishops' Conference of England and Wales is the permanent assembly of Catholic Bishops and Personal Ordinaries in the two member countries. The membership of the Conference comprises the Archbishops, Bishops and Auxiliary Bishops of the 22 Dioceses within England and Wales, the Bishop of the Forces (Military Ordinariate), the Apostolic Eparch of the Ukrainian Church in Great Britain, the Ordinary of the Personal Ordinariate of Our Lady of Walsingham, and the Apostolic Prefect of the Falkland Islands.

== Structure ==
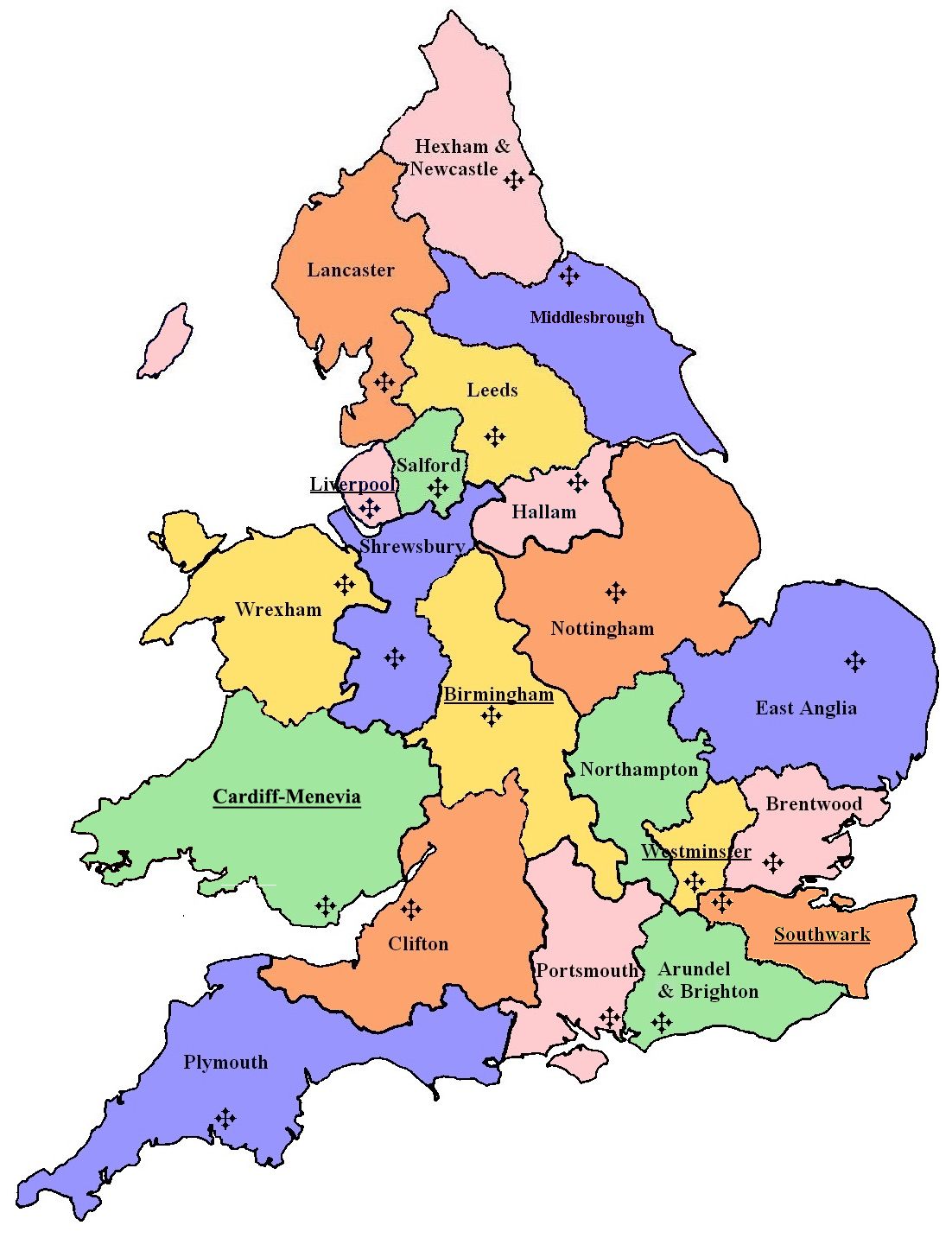
Map of Dioceses of England and Wales, with metropolitan archdioceses underlined

President
Richard Moth, Archbishop of Westminster
Vice-president
Bernard Longley, Archbishop of Birmingham
General Secretary
Christopher Thomas, Diocese of Nottingham
Membership

- Diocesan, auxiliary and emeritus (retired) bishops of England and Wales
- Syro-Malabar Church Eparch
- Ukrainian Greek Catholic Church Eparch
- Ordinary of the Personal Ordinariate of Our Lady of Walsingham

=== Departments ===
The conference is divided into departments each dealing with specific topic matters. There are six departments, covering:

- Christian Life and Worship
- Dialogue and Unity
- Education and Formation
- Evangelisation and Discipleship
- International Affairs, and
- Social Justice.

Each department consists of bishops and staff, and is chaired by one bishop. Other bishops contribute as episcopal staff, and there are a few other members serving as staff. Each department is further subdivided into committees; a separate member of the episcopal staff of that department oversees the reports and work of their committee.

=== Other agencies ===
Other agencies of the Bishops' Conference include:

- Catholic Agency for Overseas Development (CAFOD) – the international development and humanitarian agency;
- Caritas Social Action Network (CSAN) – the social action arm of the Catholic Church in England and Wales;
- Catholic Education Service; and
- Catholic Youth Ministry Federation (CYMFED) – recognised and supported by the Bishops' Conference, it is also a member of the Department for Catechesis and Evangelisation.

== See also ==
- Bishops' Conference of Scotland
- Catholic Church in England and Wales
