= Kieran Conry =

English Roman Catholic bishop (born 1951)

The Right Reverend Kieran Conry
- Bishop emeritus of Arundel and Brighton
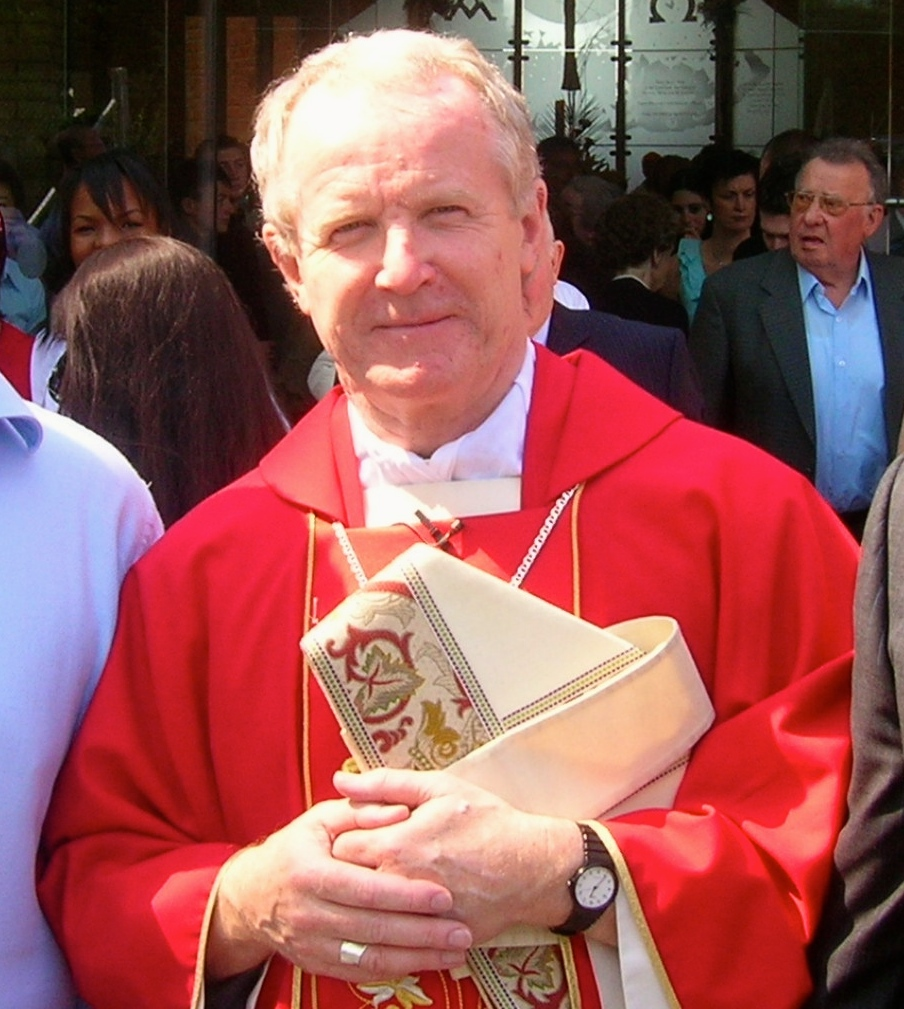
- Conry in April 2007
- Province: Southwark
- Diocese: Arundel and Brighton
- Appointed: 8 May 2001
- Installed: 9 June 2001
- Term ended: 4 October 2014
- Predecessor: Cormac Murphy-O'Connor
- Successor: Richard Moth

Orders
- Ordination: 19 July 1975
- Consecration: 9 June 2001 by Cormac Murphy-O'Connor

Personal details
- Born: Kieran Thomas Conry; 1 February 1951 (age 75) Coventry, Warwickshire, United Kingdom
- Denomination: Roman Catholic Church
- Motto: Parate Viam Domini
- Coat of arms: Kieran Conry's coat of arms

Styles of Kieran Conry
- Reference style: The Right Reverend
- Spoken style: My Lord
- Religious style: Bishop

Kieran Thomas Conry (born 1 February 1951) is a Roman Catholic bishop. He was the Bishop of Arundel and Brighton from 2001 until his resignation in 2014.

== Early life and ordination ==
Conry was born in Coventry and educated at All Souls Roman Catholic Primary School, Coventry, and Cotton College (Junior Seminary) in North Staffordshire, before moving to the Venerable English College in Rome to study for the priesthood.

He attended the Pontifical Gregorian University, gaining the qualifications PhB and STB. He was ordained in 1975 at All Souls Church in Coventry by Archbishop George Patrick Dwyer of Birmingham.

In 1976, Conry returned to Cotton College to teach English literature and religious education. In 1980 he became the private secretary to the Apostolic Delegate (Pro-Nuncio from 1982), Archbishop Bruno Heim, and then his successor, Archbishop Luigi Barbarito. He was appointed a monsignor in 1984.

== Pastoral ministry ==
In 1988, Conry returned to the Archdiocese of Birmingham as parish priest in Leek, Staffordshire. He was appointed Administrator of St Chad's Cathedral in 1990, just before its 150th anniversary the following year.

From 1988 to 1993, Conry was a member of the National Conference of Priests, and its Vice-Chairman from 1992 to 1993. He was also Chairman of the Birmingham City Centre Churches from 1992 to 1993. From 1993 to 2000, he was involved with training counsellors for Catholic Marriage Care.

From the beginning of 1994 to 2001, Conry was Director of the Catholic Media Office in London, the press office of the Bishop's Conference of England & Wales, and also editor of Briefing, the bishops' official journal. In January 2001, he returned to the Birmingham archdiocese as parish priest of St Austin's, Stafford.

== Bishop ==
On 8 May 2001, Conry was appointed the fourth Bishop of Arundel and Brighton by Pope John Paul II. He received his episcopal consecration on the following 9 June from Cardinal Cormac Murphy-O'Connor, Archbishop of Westminster (his predecessor in Arundel and Brighton), at Arundel Cathedral.

=== Resignation ===
On 27 September 2014, Conry announced his resignation as Bishop of Arundel and Brighton with immediate effect for having "been unfaithful to [his] promises as a Catholic priest" and bringing "shame" on the diocese and the Church. In his statement, he asked for prayer and forgiveness. He announced his resignation when it became apparent that the press was about to out the fact that he had been having an affair with an adult married woman. On 4 October 2014, Pope Francis accepted his resignation. He has not been laicized.

== Views ==
Conry issued regular pastoral messages to his diocese.

=== Contemporary society ===
Conry has said that society has lost its sense of the transcendent and urged Christians to "proclaim the gospel into a void that needs to be filled if we are to find our way again; there is a space in all people that can only be filled by God".

=== Young people ===
In an interview with The Catholic Herald newspaper published in December 2008, he was reported to have said that it does not make much sense to talk about salvation to young people "unless you speak in their own language."

He has criticised society's "moral confusion": "we preach a liberal attitude to relationships and allow the media and commercial interests to prey on our young people, so that they are turned into little adults long before their time. Then we shake our heads in dismay and shame when we learn that we have the highest teenage pregnancy in the EU, six times higher than Holland."

=== Confession ===
Conry has been critical of going to confession regularly, saying that, in his experience, people would always come back saying the same things week after week, suggesting that no interior conversion or repentance was actually taking place.

In a May 2009 pastoral letter, he urged a more adult approach to the sacrament of reconciliation: "Go to the priest and talk about these things, the way in which your relationship with God might have grown stale. Because sin is ultimately something that damages our relationship with God. It is not just breaking the rules."

In November 2009, he clarified statements in his May pastoral letter, following a complaint to the Holy See. He stated that, by suggesting Catholics speak to their priests about "the biggest obstacle" in their relationship with God, he was not suggesting an alternative to the traditional practice of confessing sins.

=== Tridentine Mass ===
He is reported to have stated that Summorum Pontificum does not suggest significant change because the Tridentine Mass caters for a small group of people. He added that he had never refused permission when a group of people asked if they could celebrate it in his diocese.

=== Date of Easter ===
Conry has argued against changing the date of Easter in a sense that would separate it from its Jewish roots of Passover, adding that it would be difficult to have all the different ecclesial communities to agree on a same date.

=== Civil partnerships ===
Conry has stated that the Catholic Church supports civil partnerships, because they can confer to couples, including homosexual couples, legal protection in matters such as inheritance. However, he has questioned the need to apply the term "marriage" to homosexual partnerships, saying that marriage as "the permanent union of a man and a woman" should be protected.

Catholic Church titles
Preceded by Cormac Murphy-O'Connor	Bishop of Arundel and Brighton; 2001 – 2014	Succeeded by Richard Moth
