= Diocese of Arundel and Brighton =

Catholic diocese in England

Diocese of Arundel and Brighton Dioecesis Arundeliensis-Bricht-elmestunensis

Catholic
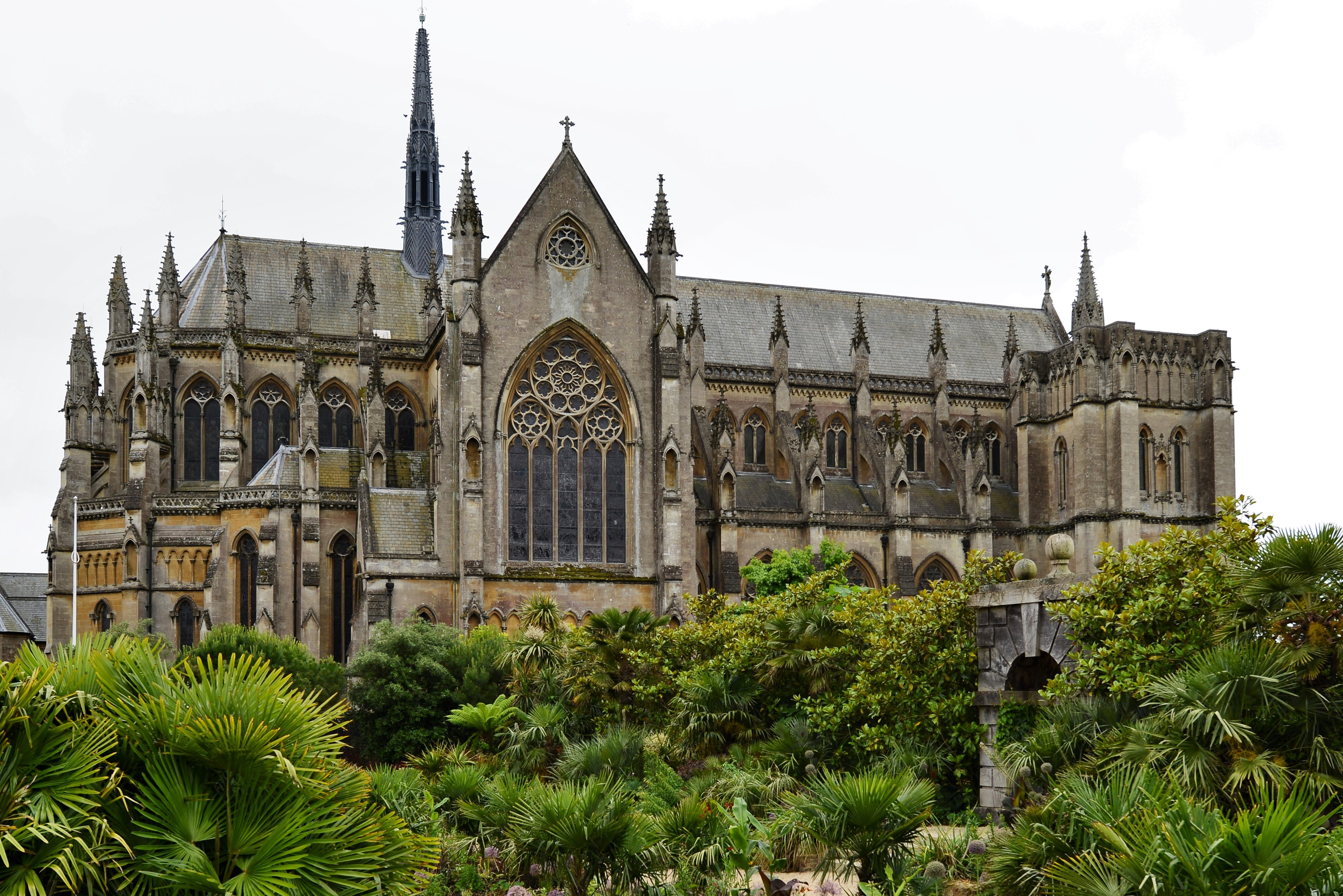
- Arundel Cathedral

Location
- Country: England
- Territory: Counties of East Sussex and West Sussex and the County of Surrey outside the Greater London Boroughs, except Spelthorne.
- Ecclesiastical province: Southwark
- Metropolitan: Archdiocese of Southwark
- Deaneries: 13
- Headquarters: Southwark, London, United Kingdom
- Coordinates: 51.856°N 0.559°W

Statistics
- Area: 4,998 km^{2} (1,930 sq mi)
- Population: Total; Catholics: (as of 2023); 3,369,600; 181,600 (5.4%)
- Parishes: 96

Information
- Denomination: Catholic
- Sui iuris church: Latin Church
- Rite: Roman Rite
- Established: 28 May 1965; 61 years ago
- Cathedral: Arundel Cathedral
- Patron saints: Our Lady of the Assumption; St Philip Howard
- Secular priests: 180

Current leadership
- Pope: Leo XIV
- Bishop-elect: Stephen Wei-Jon Wang
- Metropolitan Archbishop: Most Rev John Wilson
- Apostolic Administrator: Richard Moth
- Vicar General: Fr Jonathan Martin
- Bishops emeritus: Kieran Conry

Map
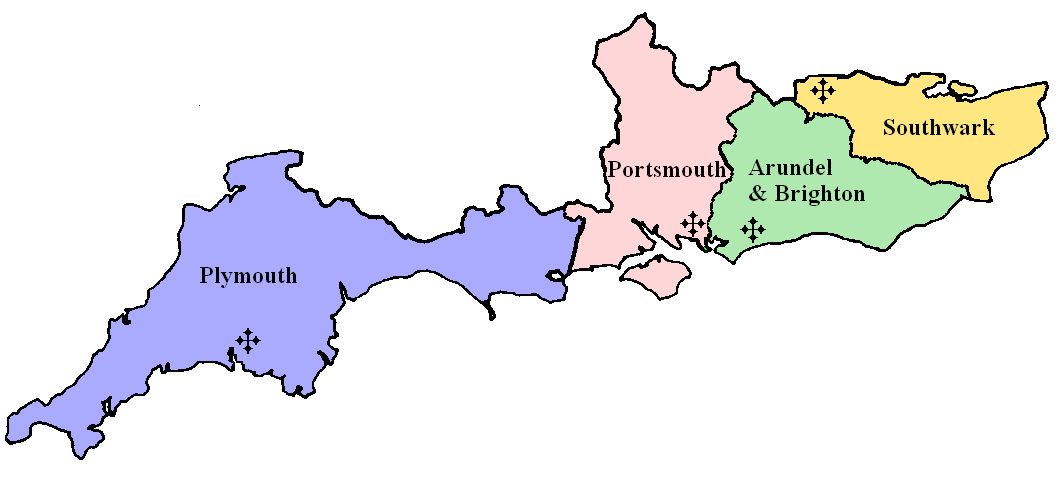
- The Diocese of Arundel and Brighton within the Province of Southwark.

Website
- dabnet.org

The Roman Catholic Diocese of Arundel and Brighton (Latin: Dioecesis Arundeliensis-Brichtelmestunensis) is a diocese in southern England covering the counties of Sussex and Surrey (excluding Spelthorne, which is part of the Diocese of Westminster). The diocese was erected on 28 May 1965 by Pope Paul VI, having previously been a part of the larger Diocese of Southwark, which was elevated to an archdiocese with a new ecclesiastical province on the same date.

== Bishops ==
There have been six bishops of this diocese. The first was Bishop David Cashman, who was consecrated on 14 June 1965. He died in March 1971 and was succeeded by Bishop Michael George Bowen, who was translated in April 1977 to head the Archdiocese of Southwark. He was succeeded by then-Bishop Cormac Murphy-O'Connor who, in March 2000, became the 10th Archbishop of Westminster, and later, a Cardinal.

His successor, Bishop Kieran Conry, served from 2001 until his resignation in 2014. On Saturday, 21 March 2015, Pope Francis appointed Bishop Richard Moth, who had been serving as the Catholic Military Ordinary for Great Britain, to be the fifth Bishop of Arundel and Brighton. He was installed on Thursday, 28 May 2015, at Arundel Cathedral, the fiftieth anniversary of the diocese's creation. He was appointed to be the 12th Archbishop of Westminster on 19 December 2025.

- David John Cashman (14 June 1965 – 14 March 1971)
- Michael George Bowen (14 March 1971 – 28 March 1977), appointed Archbishop of Southwark
- Cormac Murphy-O'Connor (17 November 1977 – 15 February 2000), appointed Archbishop of Westminster
- Kieran Thomas Conry (8 May 2001 – 4 October 2014), resigned
  - Apostolic Administrator Peter David Gregory Smith (4 October 2014 – 28 May 2015)
- Charles Phillip Richard Moth (21 March 2015 – 19 December 2025), appointed Archbishop of Westminster
- Stephen Wei-Jon Wang (2 July 2026 – Present)

=== Coadjutor Bishop ===
- Michael George Bowen (1970-1971)

=== Other priests of this diocese who became bishops ===
- Maurice Noël Léon Couve de Murville, appointed Archbishop of Birmingham in 1982
- Bernard Longley, appointed auxiliary bishop of Westminster in 2003

== Metropolitan province ==
The diocese comprises part of the Metropolitan Province of Southwark, which is currently presided over by John Wilson, by virtue of his office of Archbishop of Southwark. The diocese itself covers the administrative counties of West and East Sussex, Surrey outside of the Greater London Boroughs, and the unitary authority of Brighton & Hove. It is one of 22 Roman Catholic dioceses in England and Wales.

== Geographical area ==
Situated in the South East of England, the diocese encompasses many villages and smaller towns, as well as highly populated parts of Surrey, central Sussex and the coastal region running from Chichester to the Kent border.

== Mass attendance ==
The diocese has a weekly Mass attendance of 43,377 persons, which would be approximately one quarter of the total Catholic population. There are 116 parishes with a number of other centres where Mass is celebrated regularly. In April 2005, the Diocese had 182 diocesan and 97 religious priests, as well as 16 permanent deacons. There are many religious institutes of both men and women, living and working in the diocese in a number of apostolates. The diocese has a total of 90 Catholic schools.

== Local pilgrimage ==
The diocese also founded the annual Arundel and Brighton Pilgrimage. Though the pilgrimage is largely Roman Catholic, it is in fact ecumenical and there are several Anglican attendants. The first pilgrimage took place in 1975 around the diocese but has since gone on to include cross-country routes through England and Wales, with different themes and stops at various churches and cathedrals.

== Anti-abuse policy ==
In the early 2000s, the sexual abuse scandal in Arundel and Brighton diocese hurt the public's trust in the work of local diocesan officials.

== See also ==
- Catholic Church in England and Wales
- List of Catholic churches in the United Kingdom
- List of Catholic dioceses in Great Britain
