= Arundel Cathedral =

Coordinates: 50°51′19″N 0°33′32″W

- Cathedral Church of Our Lady and St Philip Howard, Arundel
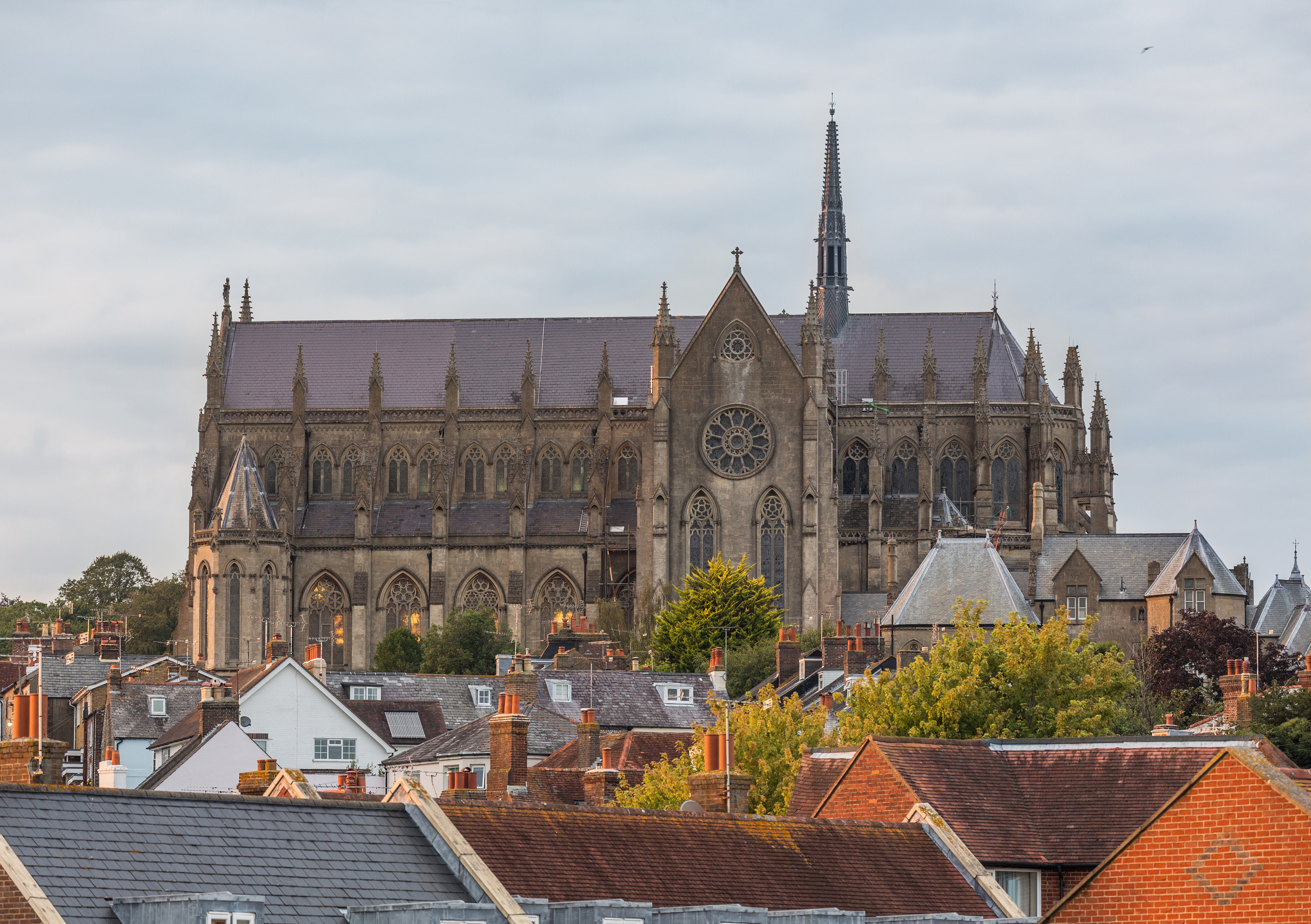
- From the other side of the River Arun

- Shown within Arundel Arundel Cathedral (West Sussex)
- OS grid reference: TQ 01525 07197
- Location: Arundel, West Sussex
- Country: England
- Denomination: Catholic
- Website: https://arundelcathedral.uk/

Architecture
- Architect: Joseph Hansom
- Style: Gothic Revival
- Years built: 1868-

Administration
- Province: Southwark
- Diocese: Arundel and Brighton

Clergy
- Bishop: Stephen Wang
- Dean: David Parmiter

Listed Building – Grade I
- Official name: Roman Catholic Cathedral of St Philip Neri and piers surrounding churchyard
- Designated: 26 March 1949
- Reference no.: 1248090

The Cathedral Church of Our Lady and St Philip Howard is located in Arundel, West Sussex, England. Dedicated in 1873 as the Catholic parish church of Arundel, it became a Roman Catholic cathedral at the foundation of the Diocese of Arundel and Brighton in 1965. It now serves as the seat of the Bishop of Arundel and Brighton. It is classified by Historic England as a Grade I listed building (buildings of exceptional interest).

== History ==
The cathedral's location, construction, design, and dedication owe much to the Howard family, who, as Dukes of Norfolk and Earls of Arundel are the most prominent English Catholic family, and rank first (below the royal family) in the Peerage of England. Since 1102 the seat of the Howards' ancestors has been Arundel Castle.

In 1664, Catholic worship was suppressed in England by the Conventicle Act, and all churches and cathedrals in England were transferred to the Church of England. With the Roman Catholic Relief Act 1829, the foundation of Catholic parishes became lawful once again.

In 1868, Henry Fitzalan-Howard, 15th Duke of Norfolk, commissioned the architect Joseph Hansom to design a new Catholic sanctuary as a suitable counterpart to Arundel Castle. The architectural style of the cathedral is French Gothic, a style that would have been popular between 1300 and 1400—the period in which the Howards rose to national prominence in England. The building is Grade I listed and is regarded as one of the finest examples of Gothic Revival architecture in the French Gothic style in the country.

The church was originally dedicated to Our Lady and St Philip Neri, but in 1971, following the canonisation of Philip Howard, 1st Earl of Arundel, and the reburial of his relics in the cathedral, the dedication was changed to Our Lady and St Philip Howard.

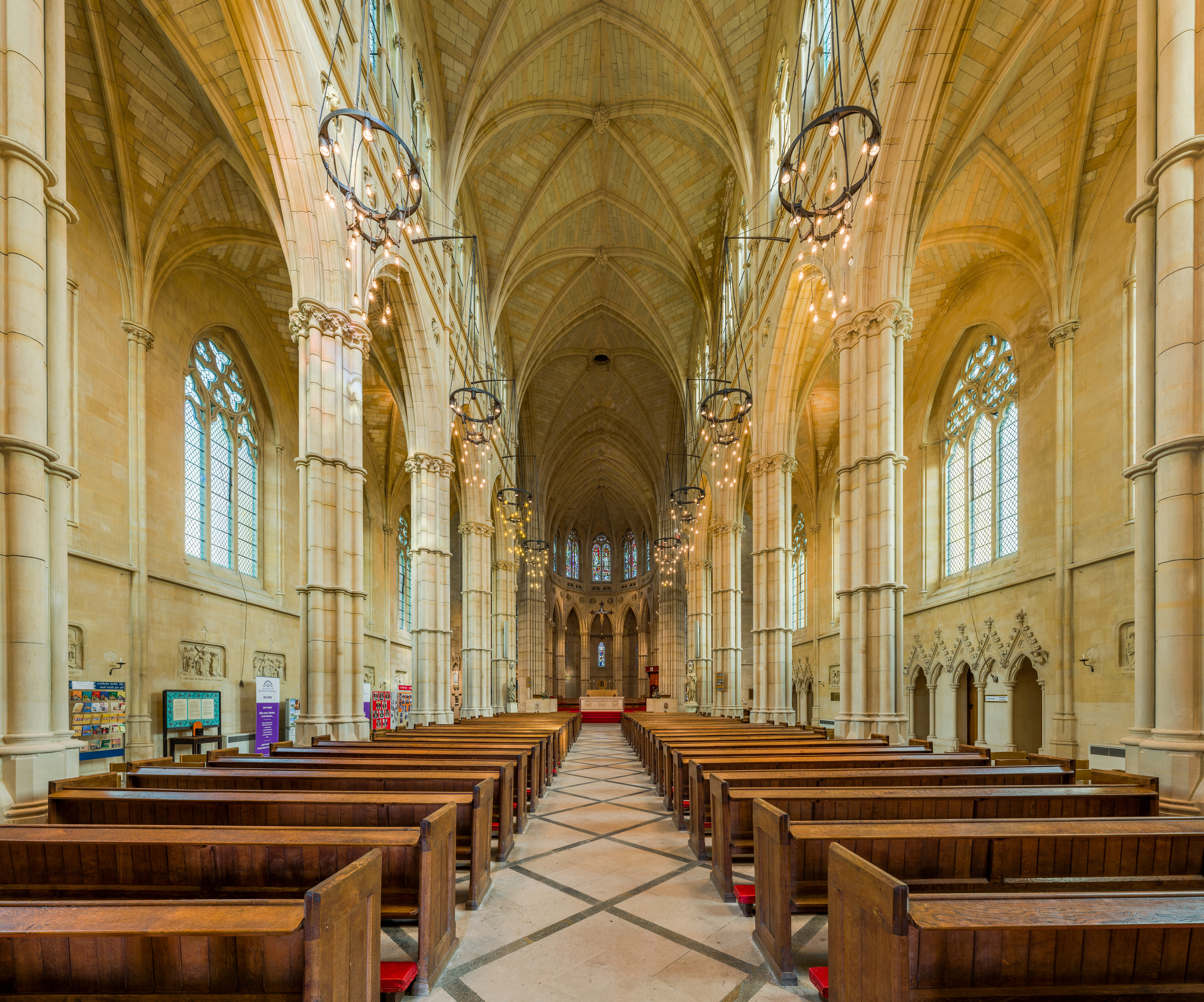
The nave.

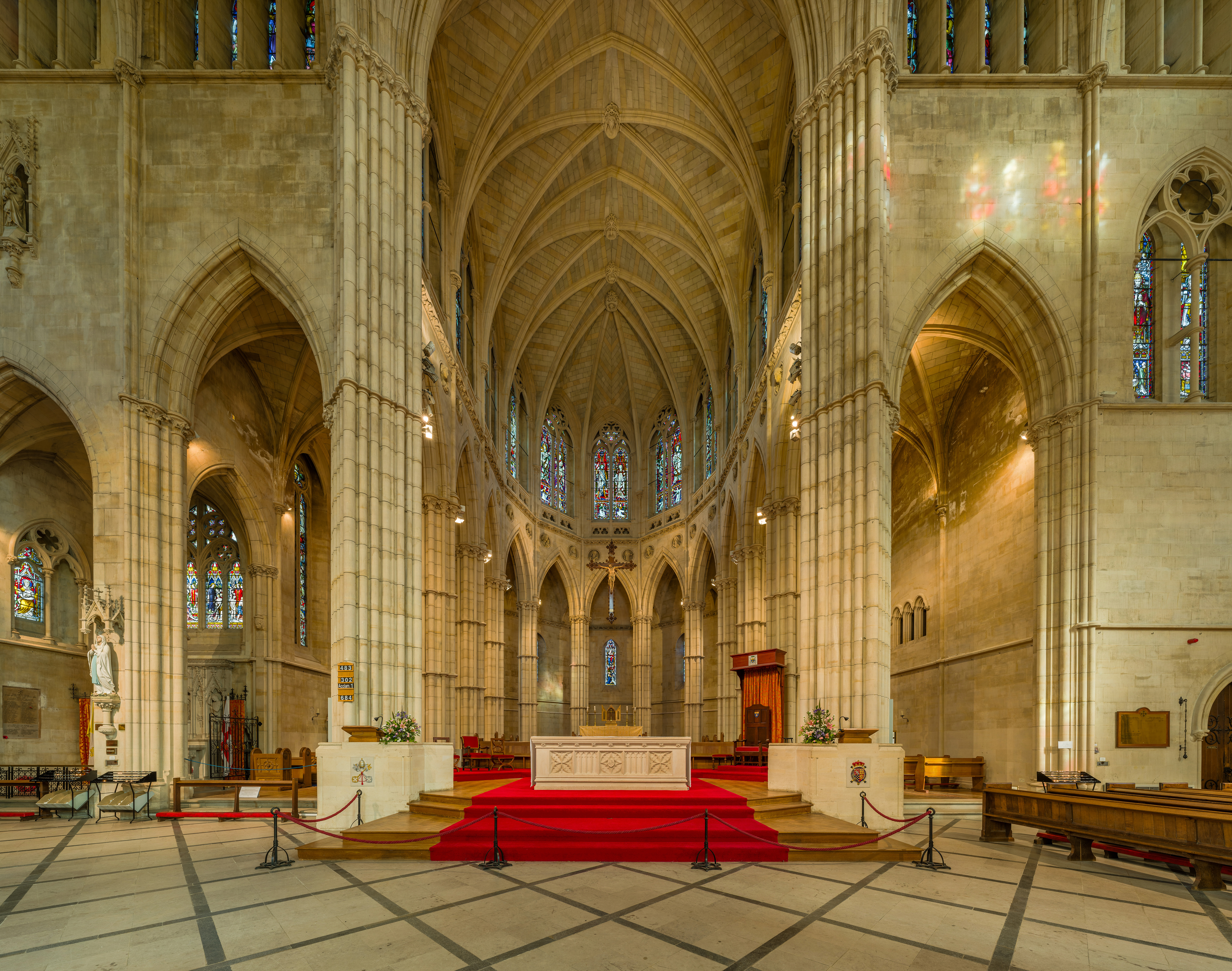
The sanctuary.

== Organist ==
In 2002, Elizabeth Stratford was appointed Organist and Master of the Choristers of the cathedral, becoming the first woman to hold the post of Director of Music in an English cathedral. Stratford was educated at St. Joseph's Catholic College, Bradford and at the University of Huddersfield winning scholarships for voice, composition and organ from the RCO and other trusts. She studied at the University of Leeds with Gordon Stewart (organ), Simon Lindley (choir training) and Philip Wilby (composition). She succeeded Alistair Warwick as the Organist and Director of Music of the cathedral, and she also teaches piano at Brighton College.

== Events ==
The Cathedral was the location of a music video of Libera and also of some of its concerts (2007, 2009, 2010, 2012, 2014 and 2019).

=== Corpus Christi ===
The annual Corpus Christi celebration draws in visitors from around the world. The floral carpet, assembled in one day by volunteers, showcases a distinct theme each year and is the event's primary attraction. Guests have the opportunity to observe the process of creating the carpet.

== Gallery ==
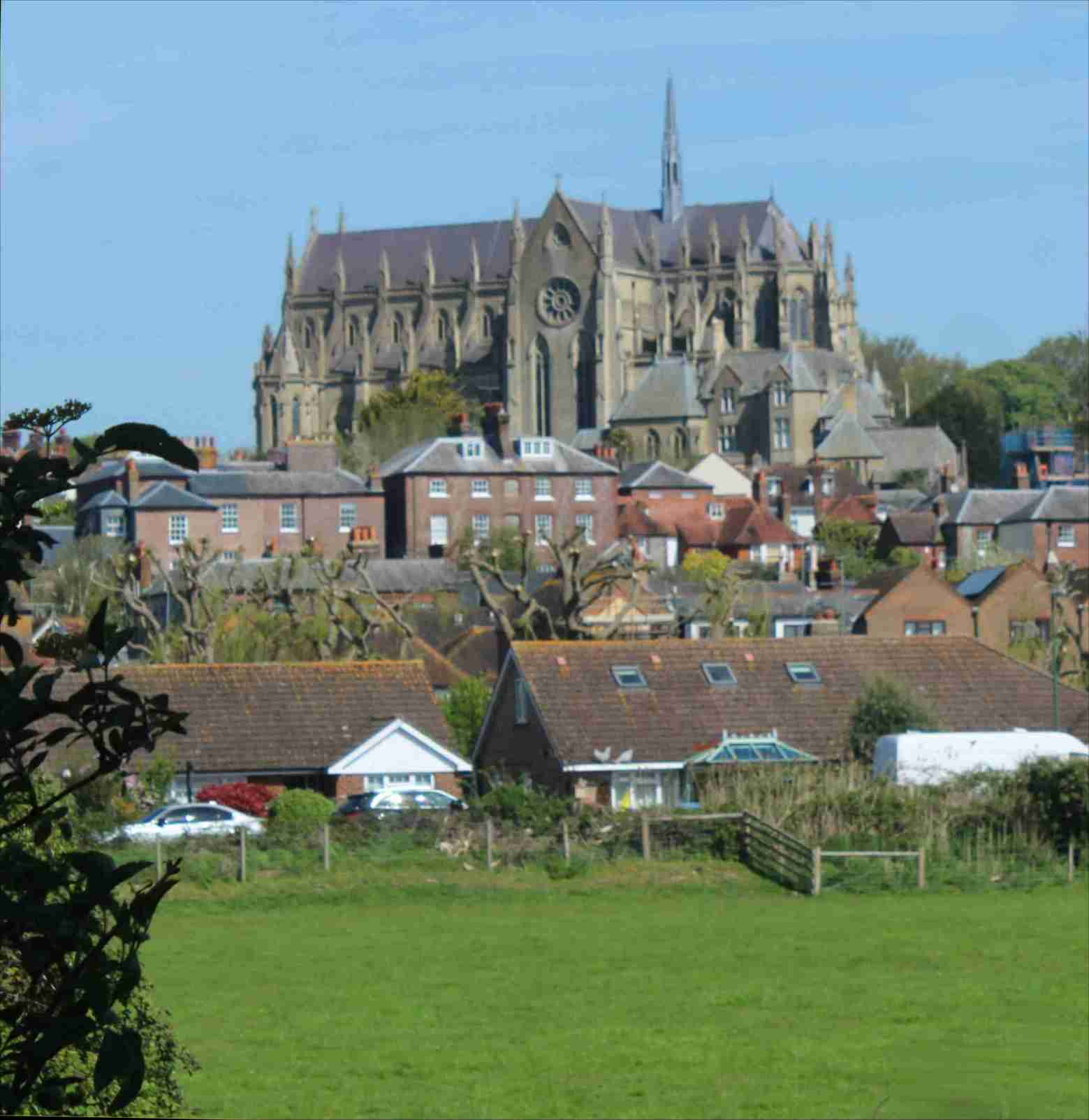
Arundel cathedral from the South

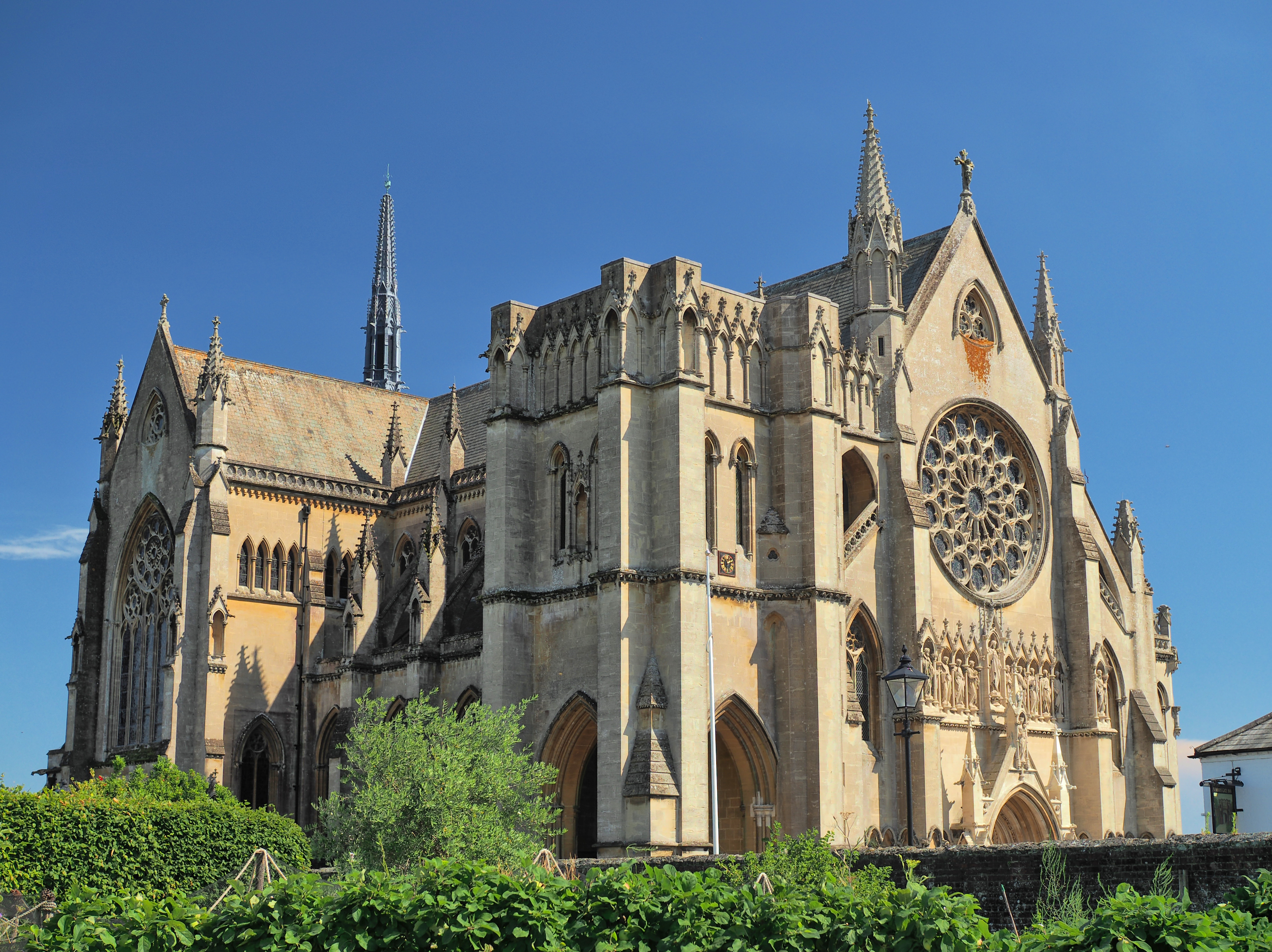
West front

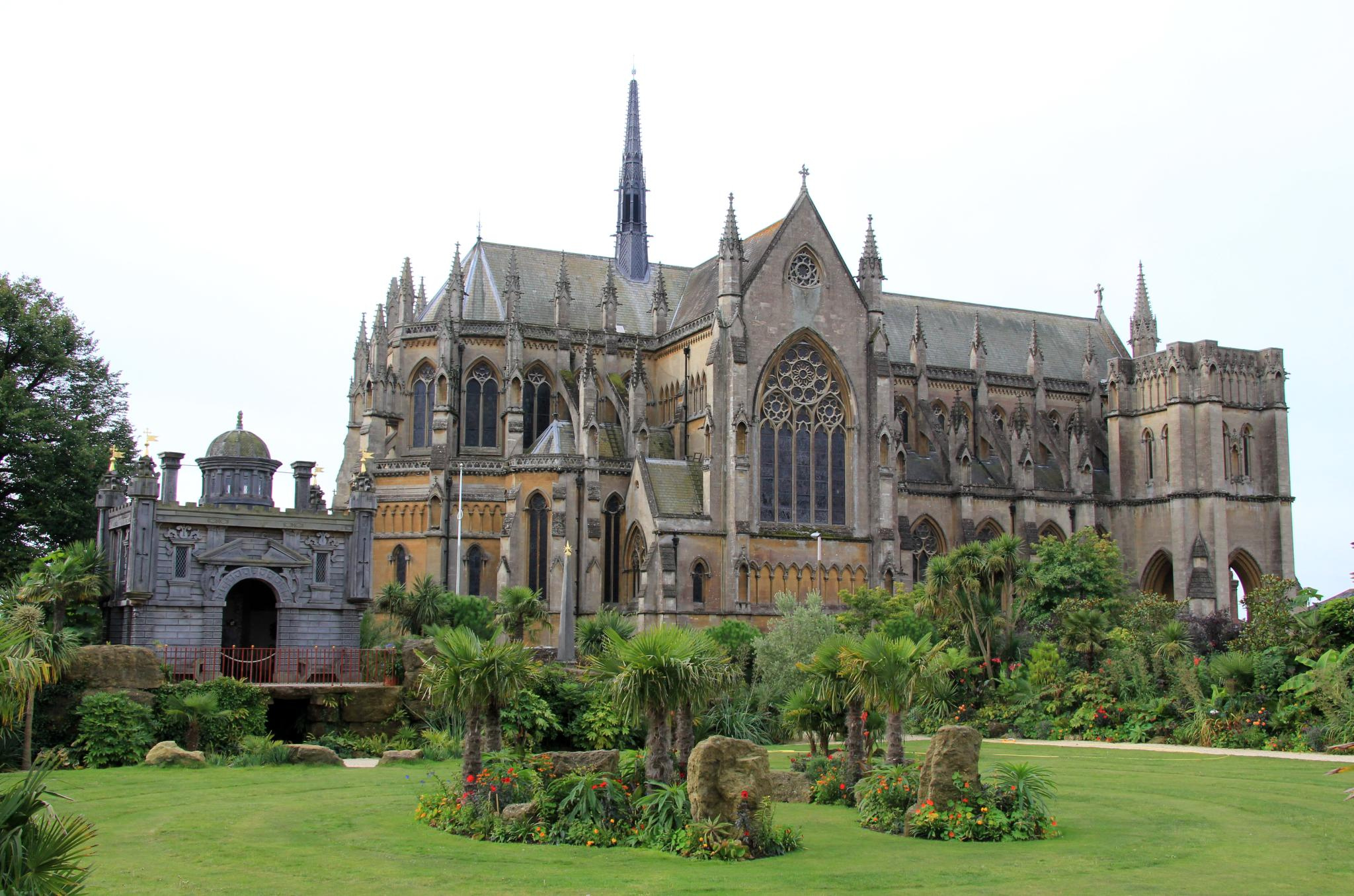

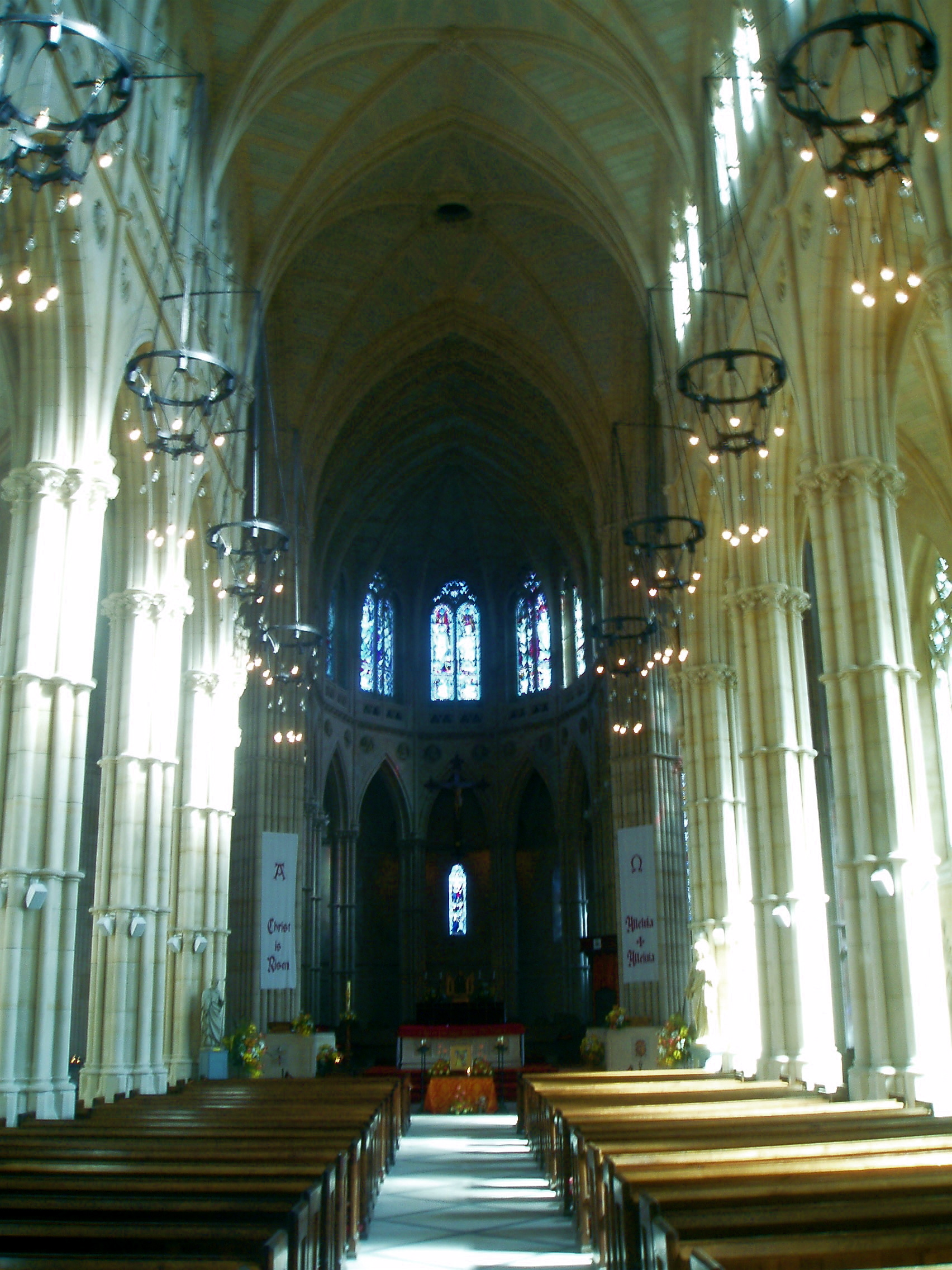
Interior

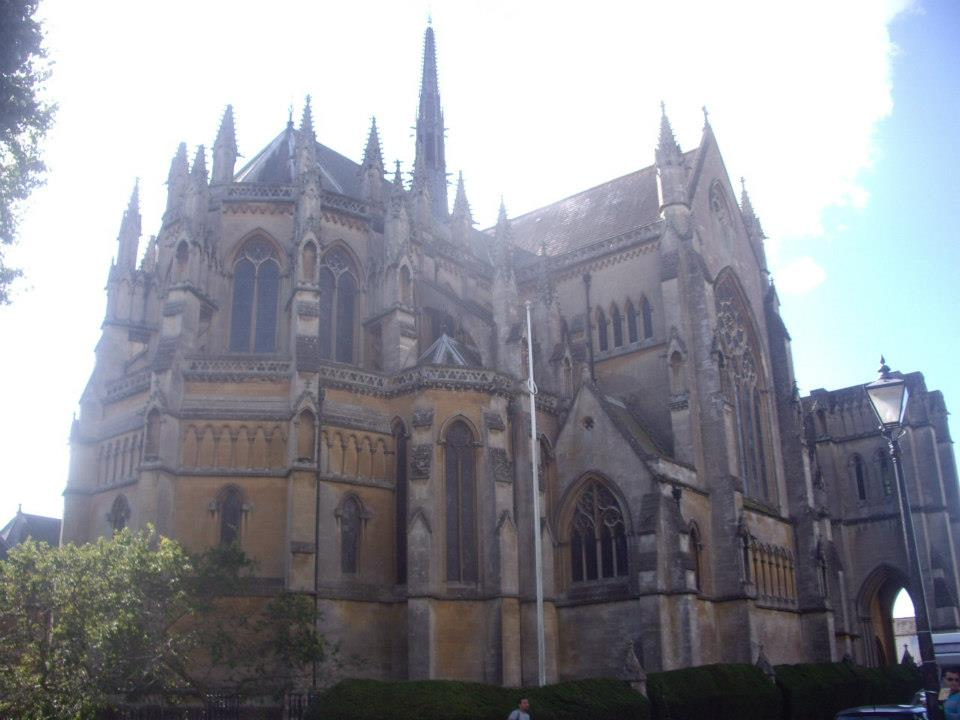
Arundel Cathedral 2012

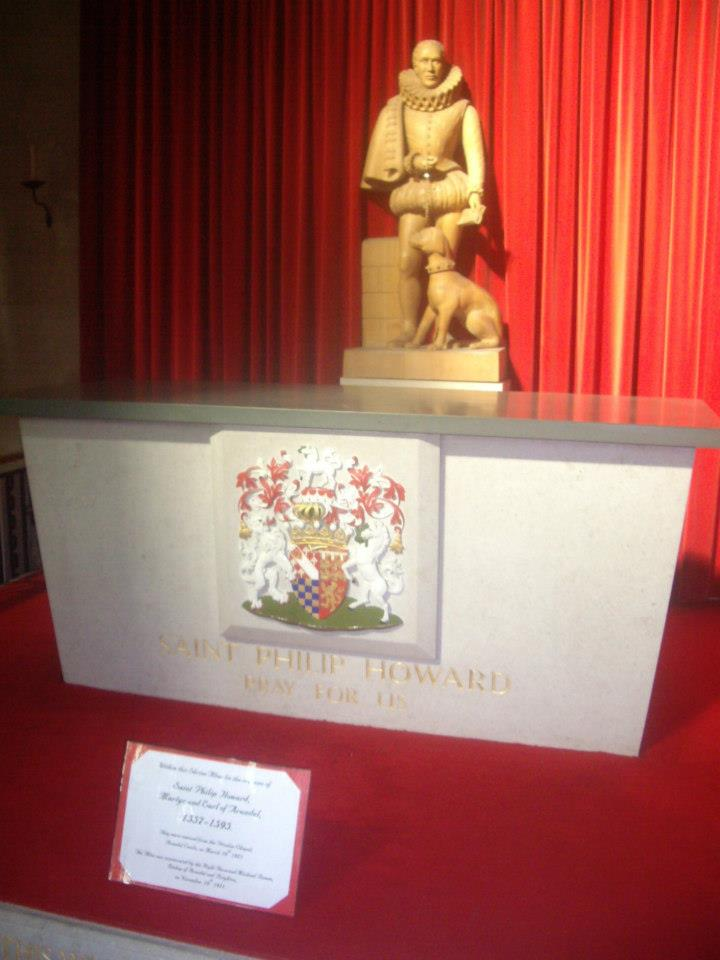
Saint Philip Howard's shrine

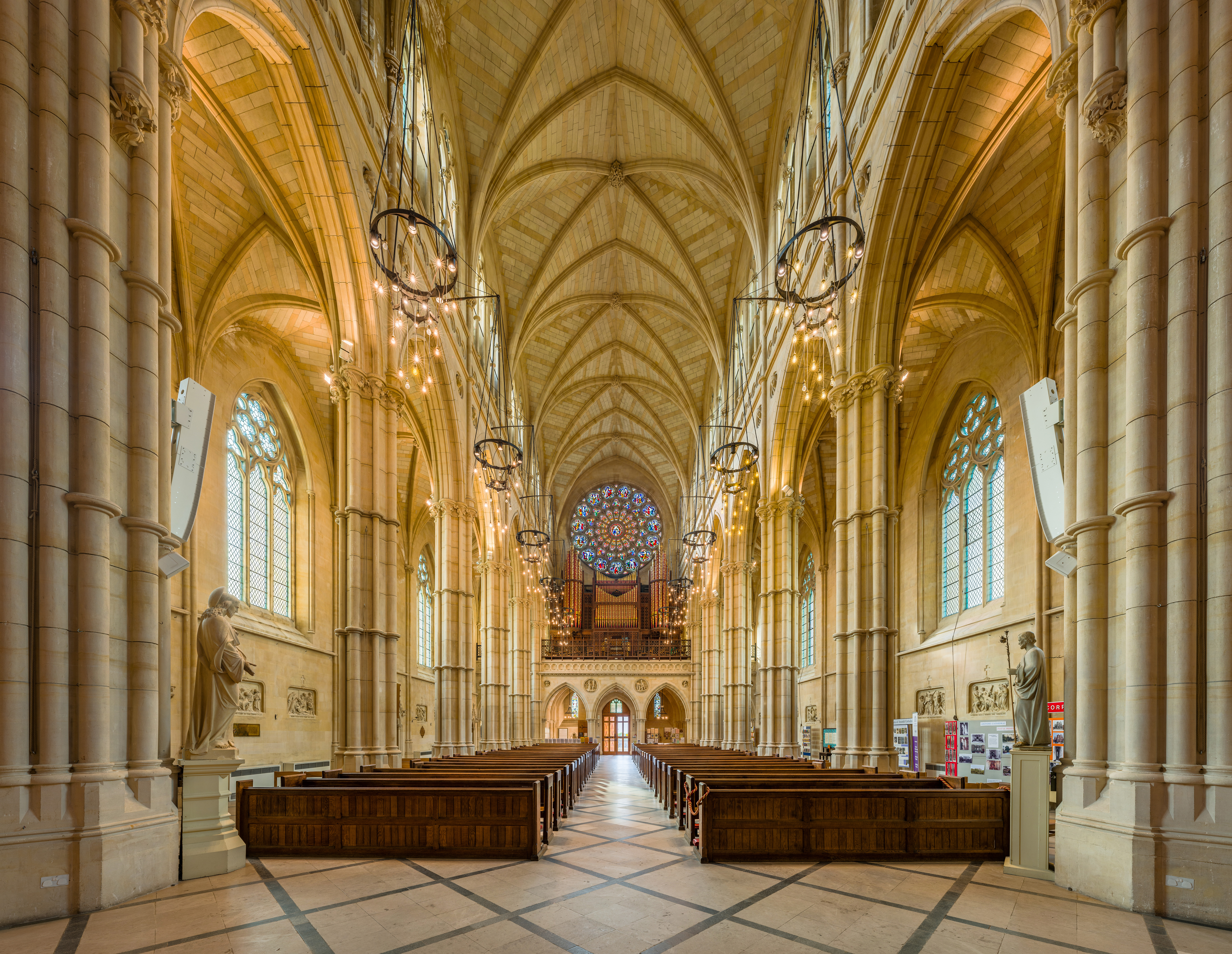
Nave looking west towards the entrance

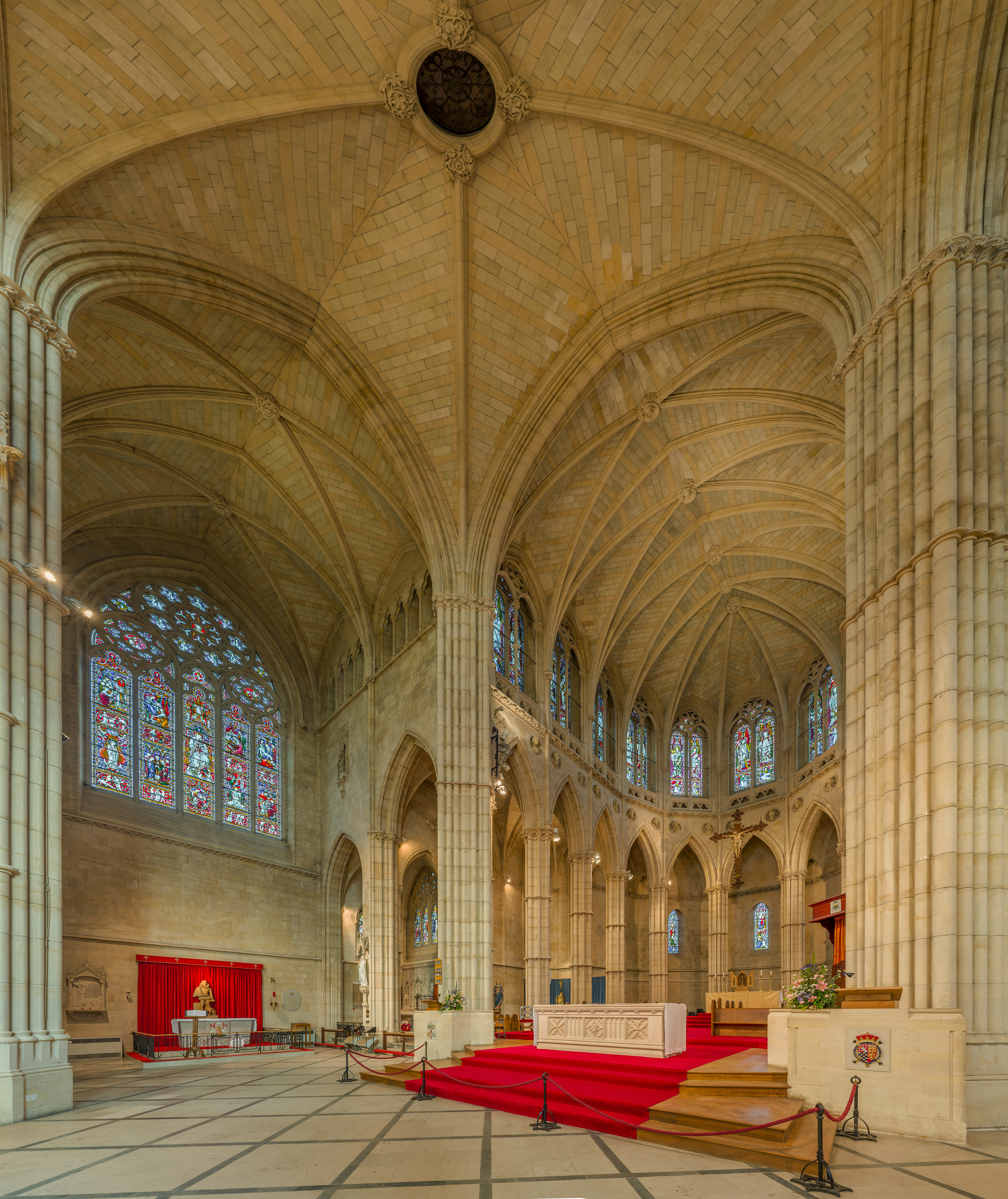
Sanctuary from an oblique angle

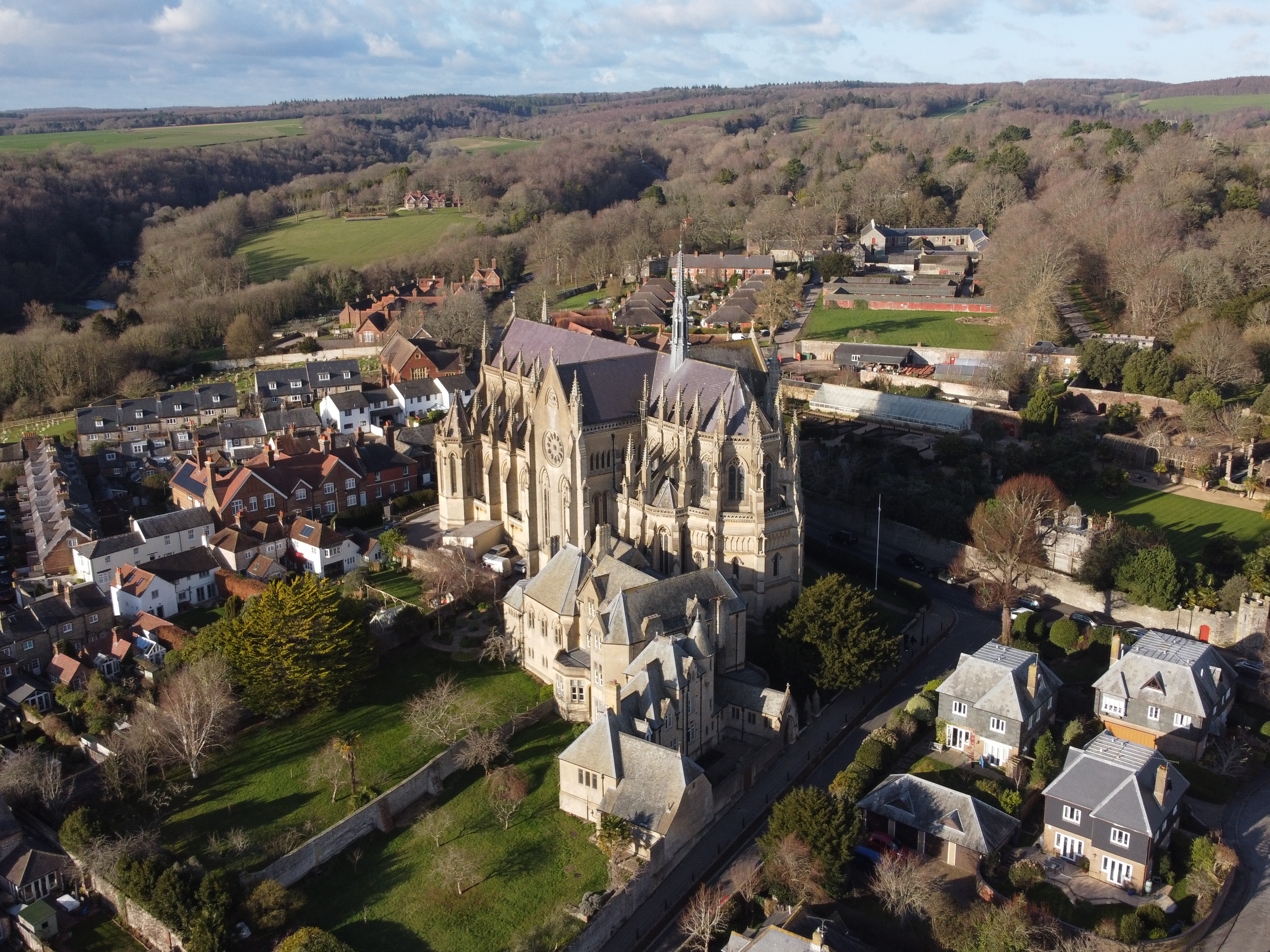
Aerial photograph

== See also ==
- Grade I listed buildings in West Sussex
- List of places of worship in Arun
