= Archbishop of Westminster =

Head of the Roman Catholic Archdiocese of Westminster in England

- Archbishopric

catholic
- Coat of arms of Richard Moth, the incumbent archbishop of Westminster
- Incumbent; Richard Moth

Location
- Ecclesiastical province: Province of Westminster

Information
- Established: 1850
- Archdiocese: Metropolitan Archdiocese of Westminster
- Cathedral: The Metropolitan Cathedral of the Most Precious Blood

Website
- https://www.rcdow.org.uk/cardinal/

The Archbishop of Westminster heads the Archdiocese of Westminster, in England. The incumbent is the metropolitan of the province of Westminster, chief metropolitan of England and Wales and, as a matter of custom, is elected president of the Catholic Bishops' Conference of England and Wales, and therefore de facto spokesman of the Catholic Church in England and Wales. All previous archbishops of Westminster have become cardinals. Although all the bishops of the restored diocesan episcopacy took new titles, like that of Westminster, they saw themselves in continuity with the pre-Reformation Church and post-Reformation vicars apostolic and titular bishops. Westminster, in particular, saw itself as the continuity of Canterbury, hence the similarity of the coats of arms of the two sees, with Westminster believing it has more right to it since it features the pallium, a distinctly Catholic symbol of communion with the Holy See.

== History ==
With Catholic emancipation, the gradual abolition of the legal restrictions on the activities of Catholics in England and Wales in the early 19th century, Rome on its own ("not by Concordat with the British government nor conversations with the Anglican Church") decided to fill the partial vacuum, which Queen Elizabeth I had created, by restoring Catholic dioceses on a regular historical pattern and replacing existing titular bishops or vicars apostolic with diocesan ones. Thus Pope Pius IX issued the bull Universalis Ecclesiae of 29 September 1850 by which thirteen new dioceses were created. Although these dioceses could not formally claim pre-Elizabethan territorial dioceses (owing to the Roman Catholic Relief Act 1829), they did claim validity and continuity with the pre-Elizabethan Church.

Historian and descendant of recusants, Paul Johnson, claims that as early as 1718, only 30 years after the Glorious Revolution, Catholics could take heart when Parliament repealed the Schism Act, the Occasional Conformity Act 1711 and the Act for Quieting and Establishing Corporations, which allowed Dissenters to hold certain offices. Although these repeals at the time only benefited Dissenters, their rescission and abolition suggested reform was in the air and on Parliament's mind.

Then in 1727, in the wake of the repeal of the annual Indemnity Acts, which relieved Dissenters of most of their civil disabilities (making it no longer possible, for example, to enforce by law the attendance of anyone at church on Sunday), Catholics, especially non-aristocratic Catholics, could slowly start to creep out into the open again, long before the Catholic Emancipation of 1829. As a result of the 1727 Act, Christianity in England (Anglican, Dissenters, Catholic, etc.) also ceased to be a "compulsory society". Still, Catholics had to wait another 95 years before being given full civil and religious rights. Nevertheless, the gains of the Dissenters a century earlier were a significant step towards eliminating Catholic disabilities later.

The Ecclesiastical Titles Act had already been proposed by the British Parliament and was passed in 1851 as an anti-Catholic measure precisely to prevent any newly created Catholic dioceses from taking existing Anglican diocesan names, forbidding the wearing of (Anglican) clerical dress or setting bells in Catholic places of worship. It was repealed by Gladstone in 1871, but even after, new Catholic Dioceses didn't take existing (Anglican) diocesan names.

One of these newly restored dioceses was the Diocese of Westminster, the sole Metropolitan See at that time. However, under Pope Pius X, on 28 October 1911, the provinces of Liverpool and Birmingham were created, and Westminster retained as suffragan dioceses only Northampton, Nottingham, Portsmouth and Southwark. These increased when under Pope Benedict XV a bull of 20 July 1917 fixed the seat of a new diocese corresponding to the County of Essex, detached now from Westminster, at Brentwood, making it a suffragan of Westminster.

During the pontificate of Pope Paul VI, on 28 May 1965, the province of Southwark was erected, with as its suffragans Portsmouth, detached from Westminster, Plymouth, detached from Birmingham, and the diocese of Arundel and Brighton erected in the counties of Sussex and Surrey with territory taken from the diocese of Southwark. Westminster retained as suffragan dioceses only Northampton, Nottingham and Brentwood. Subsequently, these were joined by a new Diocese of East Anglia, elected with territory from the Northampton diocese in the counties of Cambridge, Norfolk and Suffolk by Paul VI on 13 March 1976.

The previous Catholic jurisdiction of the London area was headed by the Vicar Apostolic of the London District or titular bishop, appointed by the pope.

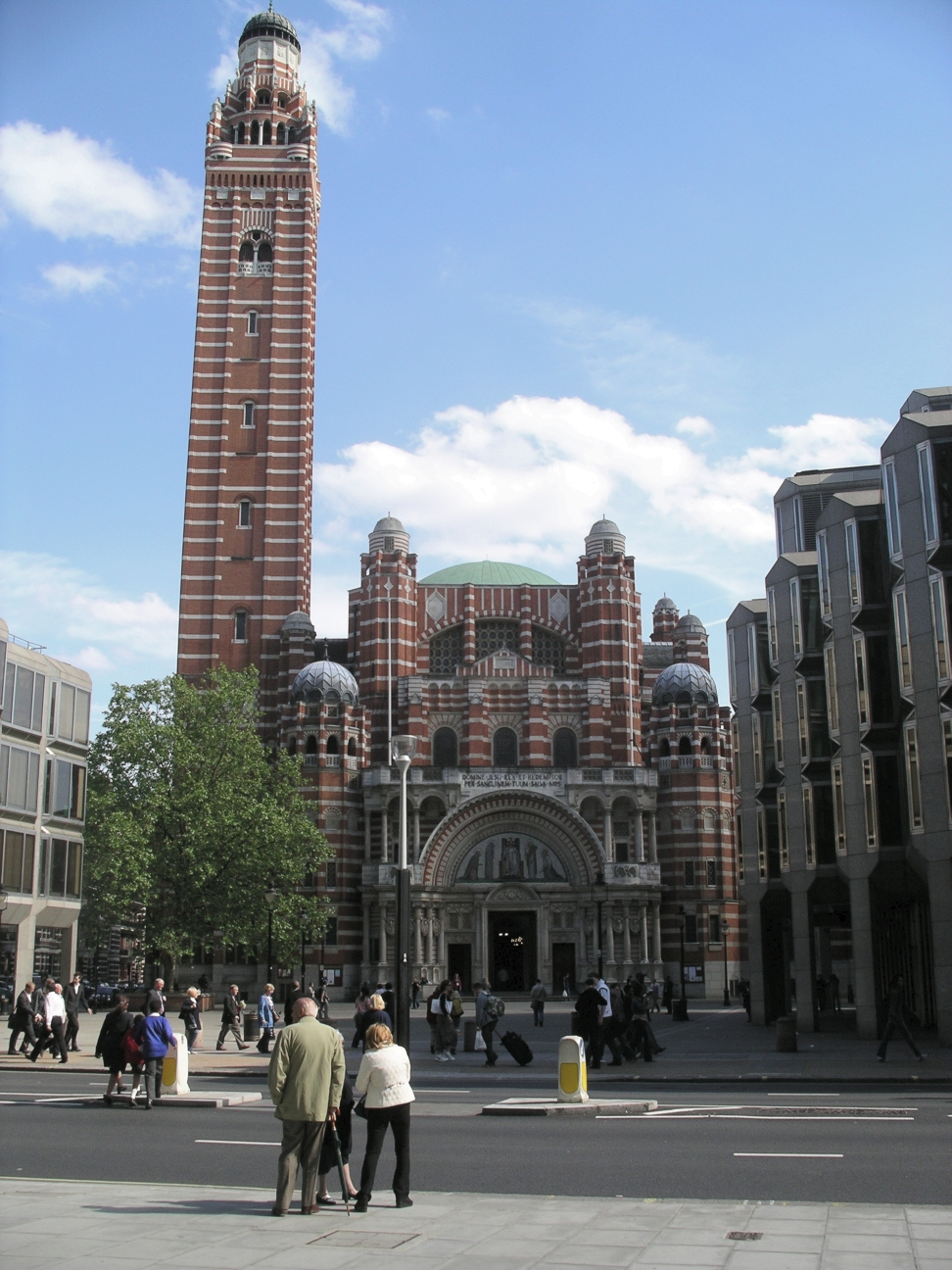
Westminster Cathedral from Victoria Street

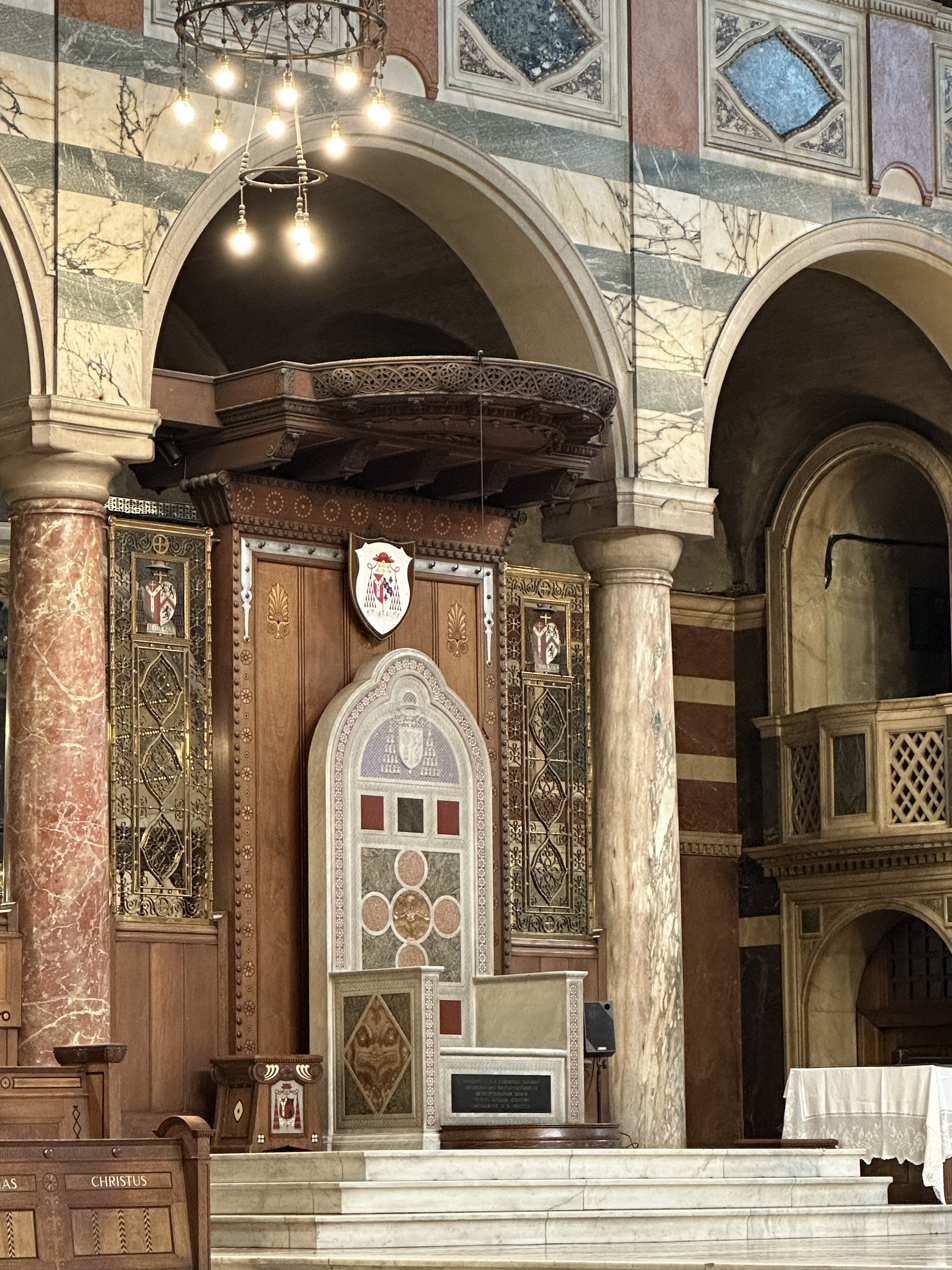
The seat of the Archbishop of Westminster in 2024. The coat of arms of the then-incumbent Archbishop, Cardinal Vincent Nichols, is placed above.

== Current situation ==
The diocese presently covers an area of 3,634 km^{2} (1,403 square miles) of the London boroughs north of the River Thames excluding Barking & Dagenham, Havering, Newham, Redbridge and Waltham Forest together with the districts of Staines-upon-Thames and Sunbury-on-Thames and the County of Hertfordshire. The see is in the City of Westminster, the Archbishop's cathedra or seat is located at the Metropolitan Cathedral Church of the "Most Precious Holy Blood, Saint Mary, Saint Joseph and Saint Peter", usually referred to as Westminster Cathedral, which is set back from Victoria Street.

The Archbishop's residence is Archbishop's House, Ambrosden Avenue, London.

Vincent Cardinal Nichols was installed as the 11th metropolitan archbishop on 21 May 2009. He was elevated to cardinal on 22 February 2014, becoming the 43rd English cardinal since the 12th century. His resignation was accepted on 19 December 2025 when Richard Moth was appointed to succeed him. Moth was installed on 14 February 2026.

== Title of primate ==
Among the old European Catholic sees, the Metropolitan Archbishop of Westminster is referred to as the Primate of England and Wales. However, in the United Kingdom, this is not legally correct, since the title is formally claimed only by the archbishops of the established Church of England, and is applied to the Archbishop of York as "Primate of England", and the Archbishop of Canterbury, as "Primate of All England". In global Catholicism, however, the last time there was an elected Catholic primate of England in Great Britain, accepted by the state, was prior to the Elizabethan phase of the Reformation. However, the papal bull Si qua est of 1911, which separated the provinces of Birmingham and Liverpool from Westminster, included the provision (in translation):

"Moreover, for the preservation of unity in government and policy, to the Metropolitan Archbishop of Westminster are granted certain new distinctions of pre-eminence. He will be permanent chairman at the meetings of the bishops of all England and Wales...he will take rank above the other two archbishops, and will, throughout all England and Wales, enjoy the privilege of wearing the pallium, of occupying the throne, and of having the cross carried before him. Lastly, in all dealings with the supreme civil authority, he will in his person represent the entire episcopate of England and Wales."

== List of metropolitan archbishops ==
Archbishops of Westminster
From	Until	Incumbent	Notes
1850	1865	Nicholas Wiseman	Previously Vicar Apostolic of the London District (1849–1850). Appointed on 29 September 1850 and elevated to cardinal on 30 September 1850. Died in office on 15 February 1865.
1865	1892	Henry Edward Manning	Previously Anglican Archdeacon of Chichester (1840–1851) and Catholic Priest of Westminster (1851–1865). Appointed on 16 May 1865 and consecrated on 8 June 1865. Elevated to cardinal on 15 March 1875. Died in office on 14 January 1892.
1892	1903	Herbert Vaughan	Previously Bishop of Salford (1872–1892). Appointed on 8 April 1892 and elevated to cardinal on 16 January 1893. Died in office on 19 June 1903.
1903	1935	Francis Bourne	Previously Bishop of Southwark (1897–1903). Appointed 11 September 1903 and elevated to cardinal on 27 November 1911. Died in office on 1 January 1935.
1935	1943	Arthur Hinsley	Previously an Apostolic Delegate in Africa (1930–1934) and Titular Archbishop of Sardes (1930–1935). Appointed on 1 April 1935 and elevated to cardinal on 13 December 1937. Died in office on 17 March 1943.
1943	1956	Bernard Griffin	Previously an Auxiliary Bishop of Birmingham (1938–1943). Appointed on 18 December 1943 and elevated to cardinal on 18 February 1946. Died in office on 20 August 1956.
1956	1963	William Godfrey	Previously Archbishop of Liverpool (1953–1956). Appointed on 3 December 1956 and elevated to cardinal on 15 December 1958. Died in office on 22 January 1963.
1963	1975	John Heenan	Previously Archbishop of Liverpool (1957–1963). Appointed on 2 September 1963 and elevated to cardinal on 22 February 1965. Died in office on 7 November 1975.
1976	1999	Basil Hume OSB	Previously Abbot of Ampleforth (1963–1976). Appointed on 9 February 1976 and consecrated on 25 March 1976. Elevated to cardinal on 24 May 1976. Died in office on 17 June 1999.
2000	2009	Cormac Murphy-O'Connor	Previously Bishop of Arundel and Brighton (1977–2000). Appointed on 15 February 2000 and elevated to cardinal on 21 February 2001. Resigned on 3 April 2009, but continued as Apostolic Administrator until 21 May 2009.
2009	2025	Vincent Nichols	Previously Archbishop of Birmingham (2000–2009). Appointed on 3 April 2009 and installed at Westminster Cathedral on 21 May 2009. Elevated to cardinal on 22 February 2014.
2026		Richard Moth	Previously Bishop of the Forces (2009–2015) and Bishop of Arundel and Brighton (2015–2025). Appointed on 19 December 2025. Installed on 14 February 2026.

== See also ==
- Religion in the United Kingdom
- Catholic Church in Great Britain
- Lists of office-holders
