= Roman Catholic Bishop of Arundel and Brighton =

Catholic bishopric in England

Bishop of Arundel and Brighton
- Bishopric

catholic
- Incumbent; Stephen Wang

Location
- Country: United Kingdom
- Ecclesiastical province: Southwark

Information
- First holder: David John Cashman
- Denomination: Roman Catholic
- Established: 28 May 1965
- Diocese: Arundel and Brighton
- Cathedral: Arundel Cathedral
- Apostolic Administrator: Richard Moth

Website
- www.abdiocese.org.uk/diocese/bishop

The Bishop of Arundel and Brighton is the ordinary of the Roman Catholic Diocese of Arundel and Brighton in the Province of Southwark, England.

The most recent former bishop is Richard Moth, who was appointed by Pope Francis in 2015 to be the fifth bishop of Arundel and Brighton, and was installed on 28 May 2015 at Arundel Cathedral.

The Diocese of Arundel and Brighton was created on 28 May 1965 out of the Diocese of Southwark when the latter was elevated to archdiocese status.

The diocese covers 1,929 sq mi (4,997 km^{2}) and consists of the counties of East and West Sussex and Surrey outside the Greater London Boroughs. The see is in the town of Arundel where the bishop's seat is located in the Cathedral Church of Our Lady & Saint Philip Howard.

== List of the Bishops of the Roman Catholic Diocese of Arundel and Brighton ==
Bishops of Arundel and Brighton
| From | Until | Incumbent | Notes |
|---|---|---|---|
| 1965 | 1971 | David John Cashman | Formerly an auxiliary bishop of Westminster (1958–1965). Appointed Bishop of Arundel and Brighton on 14 June 1965. Died in office on 14 March 1971. |
| 1971 | 1977 | Michael George Bowen | Appointed Coadjutor Bishop of Arundel and Brighton on 18 May 1970 and consecrated on 27 June 1970. Succeeded Bishop of Arundel and Brighton on 14 March 1971. Translated to Southwark on 28 March 1977, from which he resigned on 6 November 2003. |
| 1977 | 2000 | Cormac Murphy-O'Connor | Priest of the Diocese of Portsmouth and former Rector of the Venerable English College in Rome. Appointed Bishop of Arundel and Brighton on 17 November 1977 and consecrated on 21 December 1977. Translated to Westminster on 15 February 2000. |
| 2001 | 2014 | Kieran Thomas Conry | Formerly a priest in the Archdiocese of Birmingham. Appointed bishop on 8 May 2001 and consecrated on 9 June 2001. Resigned on 4 October 2014. |
| 2015 | 2025 | Richard Moth | Priest of the Archdiocese of Southwark and afterwards Vicar General. Appointed as Bishop of the Forces in 2009. Appointed Bishop of Arundel and Brighton on 21 March 2015. Translated to Westminster on 14 February 2026. |
| 2026 | present | Stephen Wang | Priest in the Archdiocese of Westminster. Appointed bishop on 2 July 2026 and consecrated on 19 October 2026. |
