= Cormac Murphy-O'Connor =

English Catholic prelate (1932–2017)

His Eminence Cormac Murphy-O'Connor
- Cardinal, Archbishop of Westminster
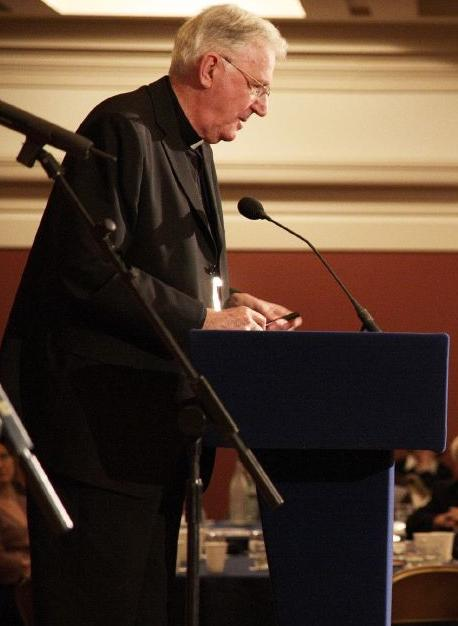
- Cormac Murphy-O'Connor speaking at a one-day National Poverty Hearing in Central Hall Westminster on 6 December 2006
- See: Westminster
- Appointed: 15 February 2000
- Installed: 22 March 2000
- Term ended: 3 April 2009
- Predecessor: Basil Hume
- Successor: Vincent Nichols
- Other post: Cardinal-Priest of S. Maria sopra Minerva
- Previous post: Bishop of Arundel and Brighton (1977–2000)

Orders
- Ordination: 28 October 1956 by Valerio Valeri
- Consecration: 21 December 1977 by Michael Bowen
- Created cardinal: 21 February 2001 by John Paul II
- Rank: Cardinal-Priest

Personal details
- Born: Cormac Murphy-O'Connor; 24 August 1932 Reading, Berkshire, England, United Kingdom
- Died: 1 September 2017 (aged 85) Westminster, London, England, United Kingdom
- Buried: Westminster Cathedral
- Denomination: Roman Catholic
- Motto: Gaudium et Spes
- Coat of arms: Cormac Murphy-O'Connor's coat of arms

Cormac Murphy-O'Connor (24 August 1932 – 1 September 2017) was a British Catholic prelate who served as Archbishop of Westminster from 2000 to 2009. He was also president of the Catholic Bishops' Conference of England and Wales. He was made a cardinal in 2001.

By virtue of his position as Archbishop of Westminster, Murphy-O'Connor was sometimes referred to as the Catholic Primate of England and Wales. However, the title of primate has never been used by the de facto leaders of the Catholic Church in England and Wales.

== Early life ==
Cormac Murphy-O'Connor was born on 24 August 1932 in Reading, Berkshire, the fifth son of George Murphy-O'Connor, a G.P., and Ellen (née Cuddigan; died 1971), who emigrated from County Cork in Ireland before the First World War and married in 1921. The Murphy-O'Connor family was middle class, with the men becoming doctors or priests, and one in each generation taking over the family business as wine merchants 'to the clergy and gentry of Southern Ireland'. A forebear, Daniel Murphy, became the first Archbishop of Hobart, Tasmania, in 1888, having served as a bishop there since 1865. Two of his uncles, one aunt, two cousins and two of his brothers, Brian (1930–2012) and Patrick, were also ordained or members of religious orders. His youngest brother, John, was a regular officer in the Royal Artillery who died of renal cell carcinoma; he had two other siblings, James (a doctor and rugby player) and Catherine. His cousin, Jerome Murphy-O'Connor, was a Dominican priest and expert on St Paul who served as Professor of New Testament at the École Biblique in Jerusalem from 1967 to his death in 2013.

After attending Presentation College in Reading and Prior Park College in Bath, in 1950 Murphy-O'Connor followed his brother Brian to the Venerable English College in Rome and began his studies for the priesthood, where he received a degree in theology. Thereafter, he earned a licentiate in philosophy and a Licentiate of Sacred Theology degree from the Pontifical Gregorian University. He was ordained on 28 October 1956, by Cardinal Valerio Valeri. For the next decade, he was engaged in pastoral ministry in Portsmouth and Fareham.

== Church career ==
=== Parish priest ===
In 1966, Murphy-O'Connor became the private secretary to Bishop Derek Worlock of Portsmouth. In September 1970, he was appointed parish priest of the Immaculate Conception church in Portswood, Southampton. Soon afterwards, in late 1971, he was appointed rector of the Venerable English College, his alma mater. As rector, he hosted the Anglican Archbishop of Canterbury, Donald Coggan, on his historic visit to Pope Paul VI in 1977.

=== Bishop ===
On 17 November 1977, Murphy-O'Connor was named Bishop of Arundel and Brighton by Pope Paul VI. He received his episcopal consecration on the following 21 December from Bishop Michael Bowen, with Archbishop George Dwyer and Bishop Anthony Emery serving as co-consecrators. He held important positions among the bishops of Europe and has also been consistently influential in ecumenical work; from 1982 to 2000 he was a co-chairman of the Anglican–Roman Catholic International Commission. During this time it was brought to his attention that a priest, Michael Hill, was a sexual abuser of children. In 2000, when Murphy O'Connor became Archbishop of Westminster, the case became known to the general public. Hill was not reported to the police, and Hill was transferred to Gatwick Airport chapel, where the Cardinal believed he would not be able to molest children. In 1997, Hill was convicted as a child molester and jailed for sexually assaulting nine children. After three years in jail, Hill was given another five years for assaulting three other boys. In 2000, Murphy-O'Connor was awarded the Lambeth degree of Doctor of Divinity by the Archbishop of Canterbury, George Carey, in recognition of his work for Christian unity.

=== Archbishop and cardinal ===
Styles of Cormac Murphy-O'Connor
- Reference style: His Eminence
- Spoken style: Your Eminence or My Lord Cardinal
- Religious style: (autofilled)
- Informal style: Cardinal
- See: Westminster (emeritus)

Murphy-O'Connor was appointed the tenth Archbishop of Westminster, and thus head of the Catholic Church in England and Wales, on 15 February 2000; in November of that year he was elected President of the Catholic Bishops' Conference of England and Wales.

In the consistory of 21 February 2001 he was created Cardinal-Priest of Santa Maria sopra Minerva by Pope John Paul II.

He was appointed to four curial organisations: the Congregation for Divine Worship and the Discipline of the Sacraments, the Administration of the Patrimony of the Holy See, the Pontifical Council for the Study of Organisational and Economic Problems of the Holy See, and the Pontifical Council for the Family. He also served on the Pontifical Councils for Culture and for Laity, and was secretary of the Vox Clara commission which oversees the translating of liturgical texts from Latin into English.

Murphy-O'Connor belonged to a group of approximately a dozen like-minded cardinals and bishops – all Europeans – who met annually from 1995 to 2006 in St. Gallen, Switzerland, to discuss reforms with respect to the appointment of bishops, collegiality, bishops' conferences, the primacy of the papacy and sexual morality; they differed among themselves, but shared the view that Cardinal Joseph Ratzinger was not the sort of candidate they hoped to see elected at the next conclave.

In August 2001, Murphy-O'Connor was created a Freeman of the City of London.

In January 2002, he preached during the Anglican morning service at Sandringham, the first time a Roman Catholic prelate delivered a sermon to an English monarch since 1680. In 2002, in Westminster Abbey, he was the first cardinal to read prayers at an English Royal Funeral Service (for the Queen Mother) since 1509. In 2002 he had his portrait painted for Westminster Cathedral by the artist Christian Furr. In advance of the 2005 papal conclave, where Murphy-O'Connor served as a cardinal elector, Cardinal Achille Silvestrini told reporters to watch for Murphy-O'Connor to emerge as a possible new pope.

He was ineligible to participate in the 2013 conclave due to being aged over 80. In a piece for the BBC in the lead up to the 2013 conclave, Murphy O'Connor recorded his experiences of the 2005 conclave that elected Benedict XVI, remembering as the doors closed to the conclave, "One of us will be going out with a white cassock on". The cardinal also referenced that he personally had three names in mind for himself in the unlikely event that he was elected as pope, settling on Adrian, Gregory, or Benedict.

On 28 October 2006, Murphy-O'Connor celebrated 50 years of ordination with a Jubilee Mass in Westminster Cathedral.

=== Retirement ===
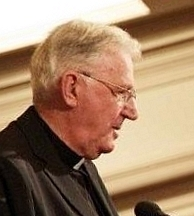
Cardinal O'Connor in 2006

Shortly before reaching the mandatory retirement age of 75, Murphy-O'Connor submitted his resignation as Archbishop of Westminster to Pope Benedict XVI, who asked that Murphy-O'Connor remain in his position "until he chooses otherwise". On 3 April 2009 Benedict appointed Vincent Nichols as Murphy-O'Connor's replacement. All Murphy O'Connor's predecessors died in office, so he was the first Archbishop Emeritus of Westminster. He lived the remainder of his life in semi-retirement in Duke's Avenue, Chiswick, London.

On 30 October 2009, Pope Benedict appointed Murphy-O'Connor a member of the Congregation for Bishops, a post he held until his 80th birthday. It was unusual to receive such an appointment after retirement.

In June 2010, after the Ryan Report and Murphy Report on the abuses by the Catholic Church in Ireland, Murphy-O'Connor was named along with others to oversee the apostolic visitation of certain dioceses and seminaries. Murphy-O'Connor was named as the visitor to the Diocese of Armagh and its suffragan sees.

Murphy-O'Connor, in a speech delivered on 17 May 2012 at Leicester's Anglican cathedral, said, "In the name of tolerance it seems to me tolerance is being abolished". He said:

Our danger in Britain today is that so-called Western reason claims that it alone has recognized what is right and thus claims a totality that is inimical to freedom ...

No one is forced to be a Christian. But no one should be forced to live according to the new secular religion as if it alone were definitive and obligatory for all humankind ...

The propaganda of secularism and its high priests wants us to believe that religion is dangerous for our health. It suits them to have no opposition to their vision of a brave new world, the world which they see as somehow governed only by people like themselves.

A friend of Pope Francis, he was a hardliner with regard to sexual child abuse cases. In 2018, the dioceses of Arundel and Brighton, Westminster, Portsmouth and Northampton were put under the so-called "Truth Project", a government-commissioned investigation which asked the Archdiocese of Westminster to release its files pertaining to the minor victims'allegations.

Murphy-O'Connor died of cancer on 1 September 2017 after an extended hospital stay. He was buried under the 10th Station of the Cross in Westminster Cathedral. As he was the 10th Archbishop of Westminster, and also because this station is directly opposite the Chapel of St Patrick, he was buried there in accordance with his wishes due to his Irish connection with County Cork in Ireland.

== Views ==
=== Islam ===
In 2004, the Muslim Council of Britain criticised Murphy-O'Connor when he said that Muslim leaders were not doing enough to denounce terrorists who carried out attacks "in the name of Allah", while clarifying that they denounced terrorism.

=== Response to Summorum Pontificum ===
In July 2007, Murphy-O'Connor welcomed Pope Benedict XVI's relaxation of restrictions on the use of the 1962 Roman Missal. He said:

I welcome the Holy Father's call for unity within the Church and especially toward those who are very attached to celebrating the Mass according to the Missal of 1962. We are confident that the provisions already made throughout England and Wales under the indult granted back in 1971 go a significant way toward meeting the requirements of the new norms.

When he issued a letter implementing the pope's rules to the clergy of his diocese in November, he was criticized in some quarters for requiring parish priests to request permission before Mass could be celebrated in that traditional form.

=== AIDS prevention ===
On 3 December 2006, Murphy-O'Connor issued a response to a statement made by Prime Minister Tony Blair on World AIDS Day (1 December 2006) in which Blair said, "The danger is if we have a sort of blanket ban from religious hierarchy saying it's wrong to do it, then you discourage people from doing it in circumstances where they need to protect their lives." In response to this Murphy-O'Connor said,

I think what I would like to say to the prime minister is that it would be much better if he used that money to provide more antiretroviral drugs – medicines – for the millions of children, women who are affected. I speak to bishops in Africa and they tell me that their dioceses are flooded with condoms and I said, "Well, has it affected?" They said, "Well, sad to say it has meant more promiscuity and more AIDS".

=== Status of immigrants ===
On 7 May 2007, Murphy-O'Connor addressed a crowd of undocumented immigrants in Trafalgar Square in support of the Strangers into Citizens campaign, which advocates a path to citizenship for undocumented workers. Previously he had commissioned major research on the pastoral challenges migrants present in his parishes, which received widespread press coverage when published as The Ground of Justice.

=== Adoption by same-sex couples ===
In early 2007, Murphy-O'Connor sent a letter to Tony Blair opposing pending regulations extending to same-sex couples the right to adopt on the same basis as different-sex couples. He said that the law would force people to "act against the teaching of the Church and their own consciences" with regard to Catholic adoption agencies and requested an exemption from the law. He continued:

We believe it would be unreasonable, unnecessary and unjust discrimination against Catholics for the government to insist that if they wish to continue to work with local authorities, Catholic adoption agencies must act against the teaching of the Church and their own consciences by being obliged in law to provide such a service.

=== Family planning ===
Murphy-O'Connor denounced contraception and abortion many times. In February 2008 he ordered the board of St John and St Elizabeth's Hospital, a Catholic hospital partly funded by the NHS, to resign because its general practice prescribed the morning-after pill and issued abortion referrals.

In February 2013, Murphy-O'Connor said that while a radical departure from previous teaching was not likely, it would be "wise" to focus on "what's good and what's true" about marriage and family life instead. He said:

I think that every Pope will face what needs to be faced and with regard to contraception I think the Pope won't say the Church has been wrong the whole time. He'll be saying there are ways ... I think the Pope will be as every other Pope has, particularly Pope Benedict, understanding that the fundamental teaching on sexuality is concentrated on marriage, on family life. I think that the Church would be wise actually to focus on that in her teaching, rather than saying "we condemn this, we condemn that, or the other". No – focus on what's good and what's true.

=== Embryo bill ===
In March 2008, Murphy-O'Connor joined Cardinal Keith O'Brien of Scotland in opposing the government's proposed embryology bill. The government had instructed its MPs to vote for the bill, which angered some Catholic MPs. Murphy-O'Connor said "Certainly, there are some aspects of this bill on which I believe there ought to be a free vote, because Catholics and others will want to vote according to their conscience". The government gave in to the pressure and promised to allow MPs a free vote.

=== Atheism ===
In 2008, Murphy-O'Connor urged Christians to treat atheists and agnostics with deep esteem, "because the hidden God is active in their lives as well as in the lives of those who believe". However, in 2009, speaking after Archbishop Vincent Nichols' installation, he said that a lack of faith is "the greatest of evils".

=== Iraq War ===
Murphy-O'Connor opposed the Iraq War.

== Writings ==
- Foreword to A Roman Miscellany: The English in Rome, 1550–2000, ed. by Nicholas Schofield (Leominster: Gracewing, 2002).

== Distinctions ==
- House of Bourbon-Two Sicilies: Knight Grand Cross of Justice of the Sacred Military Constantinian Order of Saint George

Catholic Church titles
Preceded by Michael Bowen	Bishop of Arundel and Brighton; 1977–2000	Succeeded by Kieran Conry
Preceded by Basil Hume	Archbishop of Westminster; 2000–2009	Succeeded by Vincent Nichols
Preceded by Anastasio Ballestrero	Cardinal-Priest of Santa Maria sopra Minerva; 2001–2017	Succeeded by António Marto
