= Apostolic Nunciature to Iran =

Diplomatic post of the Holy See

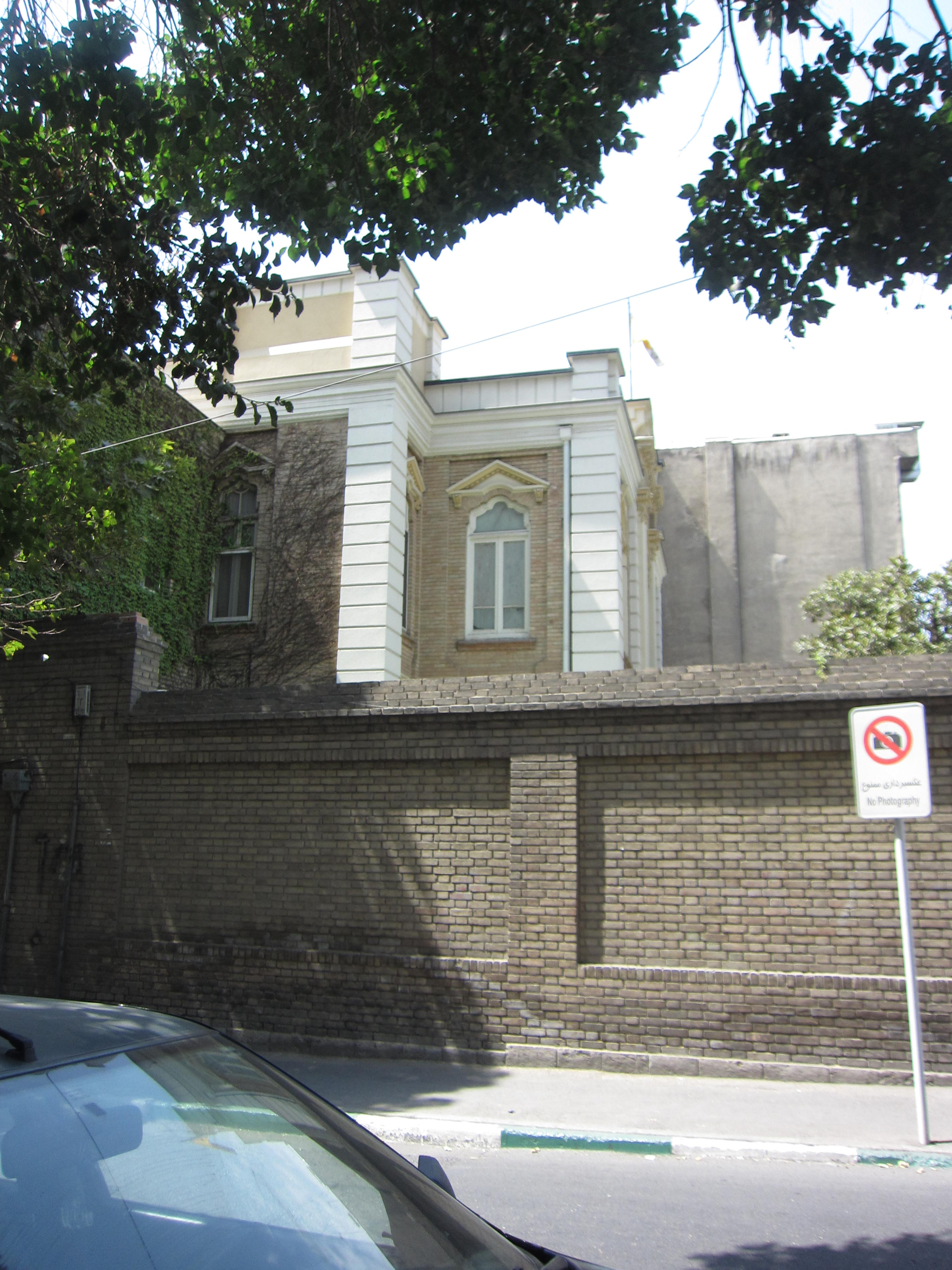
- Location: Tehran
- Apostolic Nuncio: Archbishop Leo Boccardi

The Apostolic Nunciature to Iran is an ecclesiastical office of the Catholic Church in Iran. It is a diplomatic post of the Holy See, whose representative is called the Apostolic Nuncio with the rank of an ambassador.

== List of papal representatives ==
Apostolic Delegate to Persia

- Augustin-Pierre Cluzel (30 May 1874 - 12 August 1882 Died)
- Jacques-Hector Thomas (4 May 1883 - 9 September 1890)
- Hilarion Joseph Montéty Pailhas (13 February 1891 - April 1896)
- François Lesné (20 April 1896 - 11 February 1910)
- Jacques-Émile Sontag (13 July 1910 - 27 July 1918)
- Angelo Maria Dolci (1918 - 21 December 1921)
- Adriaan Smets (13 January 1922 - 1930)
- Egidio Lari (1 June 1931 - March 1936)
- Alcide Marina (7 March 1936 - 18 April 1945)

Apostolic Delegates to Iran

- Paolo Pappalardo (7 August 1948 - 19 March 1953)

Apostolic Internuncios to Iran

- Raffaele Forni (31 July 1953 - 24 September 1955)
- Giuseppe Paupini (2 February 1956 - 25 February 1957)
- Vittore Ugo Righi (14 October 1961 - 1 February 1964)
- Salvatore Asta (23 March 1964 - 7 June 1969)

Apostolic Pro-Nuncios to Iran

- Paolino Limongi (9 July 1969 - March 1971)
- Ernesto Gallina (15 March 1971 - 4 January 1976)
- Annibale Bugnini (4 January 1976 - 3 July 1982)
- Giovanni De Andrea (26 January 1983 - 22 November 1986)
- John Bulaitis (11 July 1987 - 30 November 1991)
- Romeo Panciroli (18 March 1992 - 1 February 1995)

Apostolic Nuncios to Iran

- Romeo Panciroli (1 February 1994 - April 1999)
- Angelo Mottola (16 July 1999 - 25 January 2007)
- Jean-Paul Gobel (10 October 2007 - 5 January 2013)
- Leo Boccardi (11 July 2013 - 11 March 2021)
- Andrzej Józwowicz (28 June 2021 – 31 January 2026)

== See also ==
- Holy See–Iran relations
- Foreign relations of the Holy See
- List of heads of the diplomatic missions of the Holy See
