= Annibale Bugnini =

Italian Latin Catholic archbishop (born 1912)

His Excellency, The Most Reverend Annibale Bugnini CM
- Apostolic Pro-Nuncio to Iran
- Archbishop Bugnini, circa 1976.
- Appointed: 4 January 1976
- Term ended: 3 July 1982
- Predecessor: Ernesto Gallina
- Successor: Giovanni De Andrea
- Other post: Titular Archbishop of Diocletiana
- Previous post: Secretary of the Congregation for Divine Worship (1969–1976)

Orders
- Ordination: 26 July 1936 by Alcide Marina
- Consecration: 13 February 1972 by Paul VI

Personal details
- Born: 14 June 1912 Civitella del Lago, Umbria, Kingdom of Italy
- Died: 3 July 1982 (aged 70) Rome, Italy
- Denomination: Roman Catholic
- Motto: Gaudium Domini fortitudo (The joy of the Lord's strength)
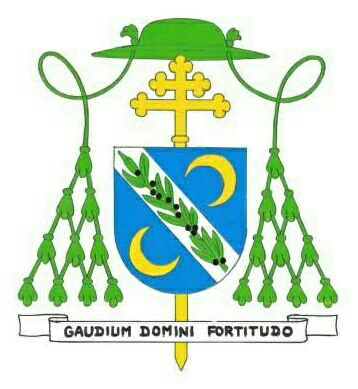
- Coat of arms: Annibale Bugnini's coat of arms

Styles of Annibale Bugnini
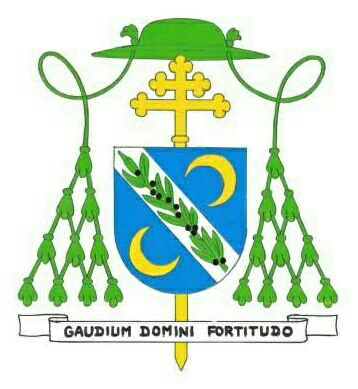
- Reference style: The Most Reverend
- Spoken style: Your Excellency
- Religious style: Monsignor

Annibale Bugnini CM (14 June 1912 – 3 July 1982) was an Italian Catholic prelate who served as secretary of the Consilium, a papal commission that worked on the reform of the Roman Rite following the Second Vatican Council. Both critics and proponents of the changes made to the Mass, the Liturgy of the Hours and other liturgical practices consider him to be the dominant force in these efforts. He was a member of the Vincentians.

Bugnini held several other posts in the Roman Curia and ended his career as papal nuncio to Iran, where he acted as an intermediary during the Iran hostage crisis of 1979 to 1981.

== Early life and ordination ==
Annibale Bugnini was born in Civitella del Lago in Umbria.

He completed his doctorate in sacred theology at the Pontifical University of St. Thomas Aquinas Angelicum in 1938 with a dissertation entitled De liturgia eiusque momento in Concilio Tridentino.

He spent ten years in parish work in a suburb of Rome. In 1947, Bugnini became involved in the production of the missionary publications of his order and became the editor of Ephemerides Liturgicæ, a scholarly journal founded in 1887 and dedicated to the study of the Catholic liturgy. Starting in 1949, he taught liturgical studies at the Pontifical Urban College (now the Pontifical Urban University). He later became a professor at the Pontifical Lateran University.

== Curial career ==
On 28 May 1948, Pope Pius XII appointed Bugnini secretary to the Commission for Liturgical Reform, which created a revised rite for the Easter Vigil in 1951 and revised ceremonies for the rest of Holy Week in 1955. The commission also made changes in 1955 to the rubrics of the Mass and office, suppressing many of the Church's octaves and a number of vigils, and abolishing the first vespers of most feasts. In 1960 the commission modified the Code of Rubrics, which led to new editions of the Roman Breviary in 1961 and of the Roman Missal in 1962.

On 25 January 1959, Pope John XXIII announced his plan to convene the Second Vatican Council. On 6 June 1960, Fr. Bugnini was named secretary of the Pontifical Preparatory Commission on the Liturgy. This body produced the first drafts of the document that, after many changes, would become the council's Constitution on the Sacred Liturgy (1963). When the council convened in October 1962, the Preparatory Commission was succeeded by the Conciliar Commission on the Sacred Liturgy, on which Bugnini was assigned the role of a peritus (expert). At the same time, Bugnini was removed from the chair of Liturgy at the Pontifical Lateran University because, in the words of Piero Marini, "his liturgical ideas were seen as too progressive." In his posthumously published memoirs, Second Vatican Council consultant Louis Bouyer called Bugnini "a man as bereft of culture as he was of basic honesty."

The council and Pope Paul VI approved the Constitution on the Liturgy on 4 December 1963. On 30 January 1964, the Pope appointed Bugnini secretary of the Council for the Implementation of the Constitution on the Liturgy. Bugnini was appointed the secretary of the Congregation for Divine Worship by Pope Paul in May 1969. In January 1965, he had become an undersecretary of the Sacred Congregation of Rites, which was responsible for causes for beatification and canonization.

== Diplomatic service ==
On 4 January 1976, Pope Paul named Bugnini pro-nuncio to Iran. Bugnini studied the country, its history, and traditions. The results of his research appeared in 1981 as La Chiesa in Iran (The Church in Iran).

In 1979, Bugnini, on behalf of the pope, tried unsuccessfully to obtain the release of the American hostages being held at the United States embassy by followers of the Ayatollah Ruhollah Khomeini. He met with Khomeini to deliver Pope John Paul II's appeal for the release of the hostages.

== Death ==
Bugnini died of natural causes at the Pope Pius XI Clinic in Rome on 3 July 1982.

His detailed account of the work to which he devoted most of his career, The Reform of the Liturgy 1948-1975, appeared posthumously. An English translation was published in 1990.

== Freemasonry allegation ==
The oft-repeated allegation of Bugnini being a Freemason was first made in print by Italian essayist Tito Casini in his book Nel Fumo di Satana. Verso l'ultimo scontro (Florence: Il carro di San Giovanni, 1976). Casini claimed that according to an anonymous source, Bugnini left a briefcase in a conference room. When someone found it and attempted to identify the owner, incriminating documents were within. English writer Michael Davies claimed that Pope Paul VI's sending of Bugnini to Iran as nuncio was due to this alleged revelation of Bugnini's Masonic affiliation, though the task of his post-Vatican II congregation had just been completed (supra). Davies further claimed that an unnamed, conservative cardinal had told him in 1975 that he had "seen (or placed) on the pope's desk" a "dossier" containing evidence of Bugnini's Freemason connection. In the middle of the controversy, Davies made an aclaration by stating that "I have never claimed to have proof that Archbishop Bugnini was a Freemason. What I have claimed is that Pope Paul Vl dismissed him because he believed him to be a Freemason - the distinction is an important one". Moreover, Bugnini was defended from such allegations by L'Osservatore Romano in October 10, 1976 in the article "Riflessioni di fine settirnana" by Virgilio Levi.

Aside from this personal accusation, Bugnini was named elsewhere in a broad group of people accused on the so-called Pecorelli list, alleging membership in Freemasonry of 121 men associated with the Vatican, where he is listed with the code name “MABRI” and number 1365/75, supposedly initiated on 23 April 1963. This list was named for the Italian journalist Carmine Pecorelli (himself a member of Propaganda Due, assassinated in 1979), who published it in his journal Osservatore Politico in 1978, but it had also been published elsewhere in Panorama two years earlier.

In The Reform of the Liturgy 1948-1975, Bugnini staunchly denied such allegations, dismissing them as nothing more than slander. The accusation was renewed in 1992 by the traditionalist Catholic magazine Chiesa Viva and in 1999 by an anonymous pamphlet.

The P2 Order "Propaganda Due" itself, when it published a list of Masonic brothers in 1981 in a rare case of violation of Masonic secrecy (which would have been a calculated attempt to confuse people, by including genuine Masons alongside many others), however there was not enough evidence from the P2 Order to prove it. Although there are plenty of second-hand testimonies alleging that Bugnini was a Freemason, no one has been able to see the documentary evidence, which has already been presented to the Vatican and is likely classified.

== Bibliography ==
- La Chiesa in Iran (The Church in Iran), 1981
- La Riforma Liturgica 1948-1975 (The Reform of the Liturgy, 1948-1975), 1983
- Liturgiae cultor et amator, servì la Chiesa: Memorie autobiografiche, 2012 (Posthumous)

Preceded by Enrico Dante	Delegate of Pontifical Liturgical Celebrations; 1968 – 9 January 1970	Succeeded by Virgilio Noè
