= Baschi =

- Comune
- Comune di Baschi
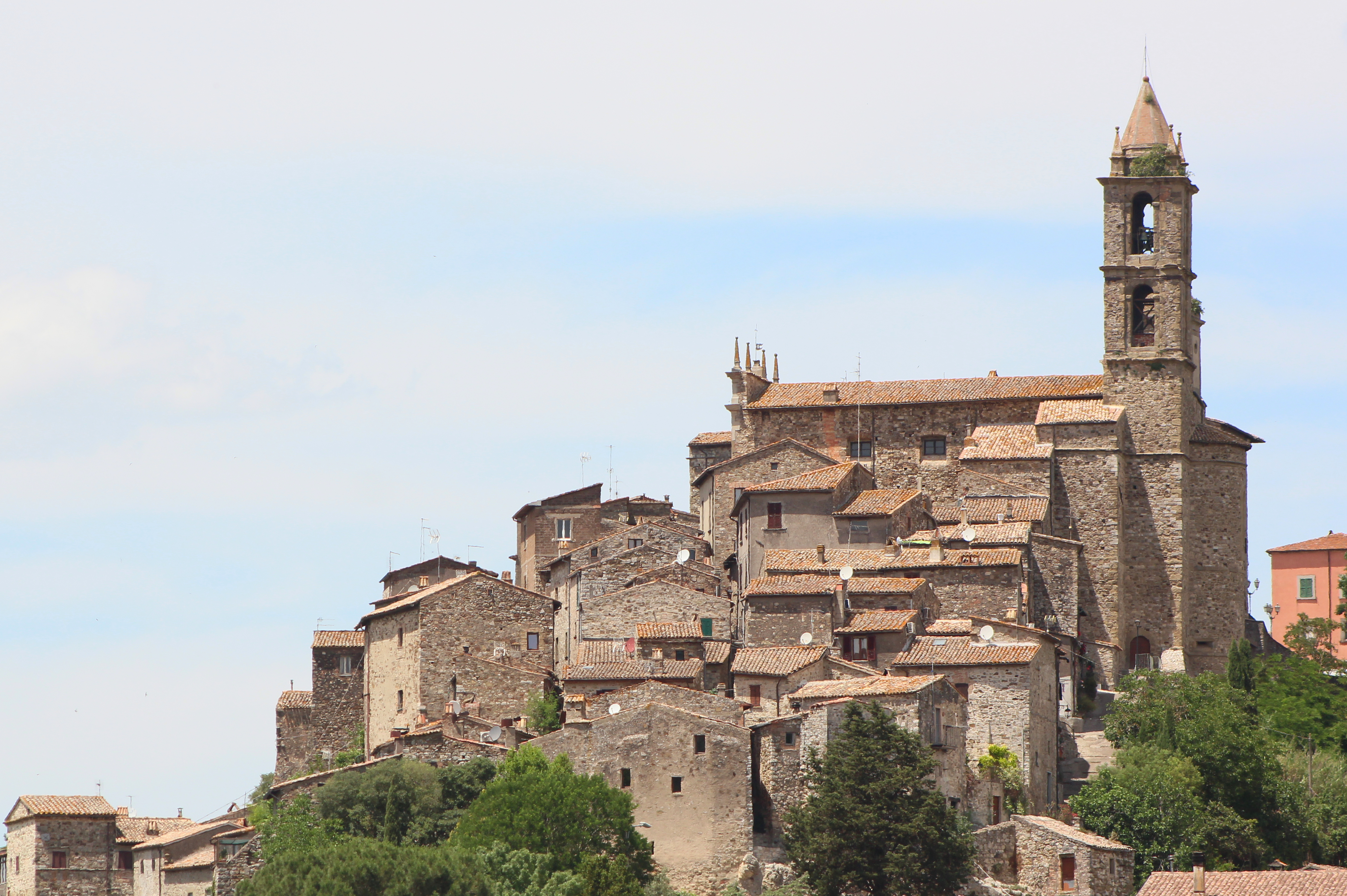
- A view of Baschi

- Coat of arms

- Location within Italy Location within Umbria
- Coordinates: 42.670228°N 12.216255°E
- Country: Italy
- Region: Umbria
- Province: Terni (TR)

Government
  - Mayor: Anacleto Bernardini

Area
  - Total: 68.57 km^{2} (26.48 sq mi)
- Elevation: 165 m (541 ft)

Population (1 January 2025)
  - Total: 2,542
  - Density: 37.07/km^{2} (96.02/sq mi)
- Demonym: Baschiesi
- Time zone: UTC+1 (CET)
  - Summer (DST): UTC+2 (CEST)
- Postal code: 05023
- Dialing code: 0744
- Website: Official website

Baschi is a comune (municipality) in the Province of Terni in the Italian region Umbria, located about 50 km southwest of Perugia and about 35 km northwest of Terni.

== History ==
Baschi is said to have been founded in 810 by the Baschi family, who were of Gascon origin and followed Charlemagne into Italy.

The Counts of Baschi constructed a castle to control the Tiber Valley and exercised influence in the area between Todi and Orvieto. Communal statutes are attested between 1384 and 1442. The family held another fortress in the area, at Carnano near Tenaglie.

Both fortresses were demolished in 1553, when the properties of Attilio Baschi were confiscated due to his crimes.

The decline of the Counts of Baschi in the early 17th century led to the transfer of the territory to the Apostolic Camera, after which the barony was granted to the Atti family of Todi.

In 1701, Baschi was a feudal domain of Cardinal Nerli. By 1803, ownership is recorded under the Counts Corbelli Sozièz. In 1816 and 1817, it is recorded under Count Francesco Cerbelli, Count Carlo Francesci, and Countess Beatrice Mazzanti Bucciosanti.

During the Napoleonic period Baschi functioned as a cantonal capital, within the Department of Trasimeno.

Baschi underwent several administrative changes between 1814 and 1827, initially gaining baronial municipality status and autonomy from Todi before being returned to its jurisdiction and downgraded to a podesteria. In 1833 municipal status was restored, with its administration once again linked to Todi.

The town suffered significant damage during the earthquake of 1832.

In 1895 Baschi had a population of 5,283 inhabitants.

After unification the municipality included Montecchio and Tenaglie. In 1948 Montecchio became an independent municipality, while Tenaglie became one of its frazioni.

== Geography ==
Baschi is situated on a small hill, with the river Tiber flowing at a distance of about 300 metres (980 ft) at its base. It lies 12 miles (19 km) southwest of Todi and 7 miles (11 km) from Orvieto.

The historic center is surrounded by castle walls, of which only a few remains survive on the eastern side, and is accompanied by a well-built borgo.

=== Subdivisions ===
The municipality includes the localities of Acqualoreto, Baschi, Case Nuove, Case Vecchie, Civitella del Lago, Collelungo, Morre, Morruzze, Perilli, Ponte, San Lorenzo, Scoppieto, Vagli.

In 2021, 650 people lived in rural dispersed dwellings not assigned to any named locality. At the time, the most populous localities were Baschi (964), and Civitella del Lago (365).

== Economy ==
In the 19th century the territory produced agricultural goods, with a notable emphasis on olive oil and wine. There was also a quarry producing stone for millstones.

== Religion ==
=== San Niccolò ===
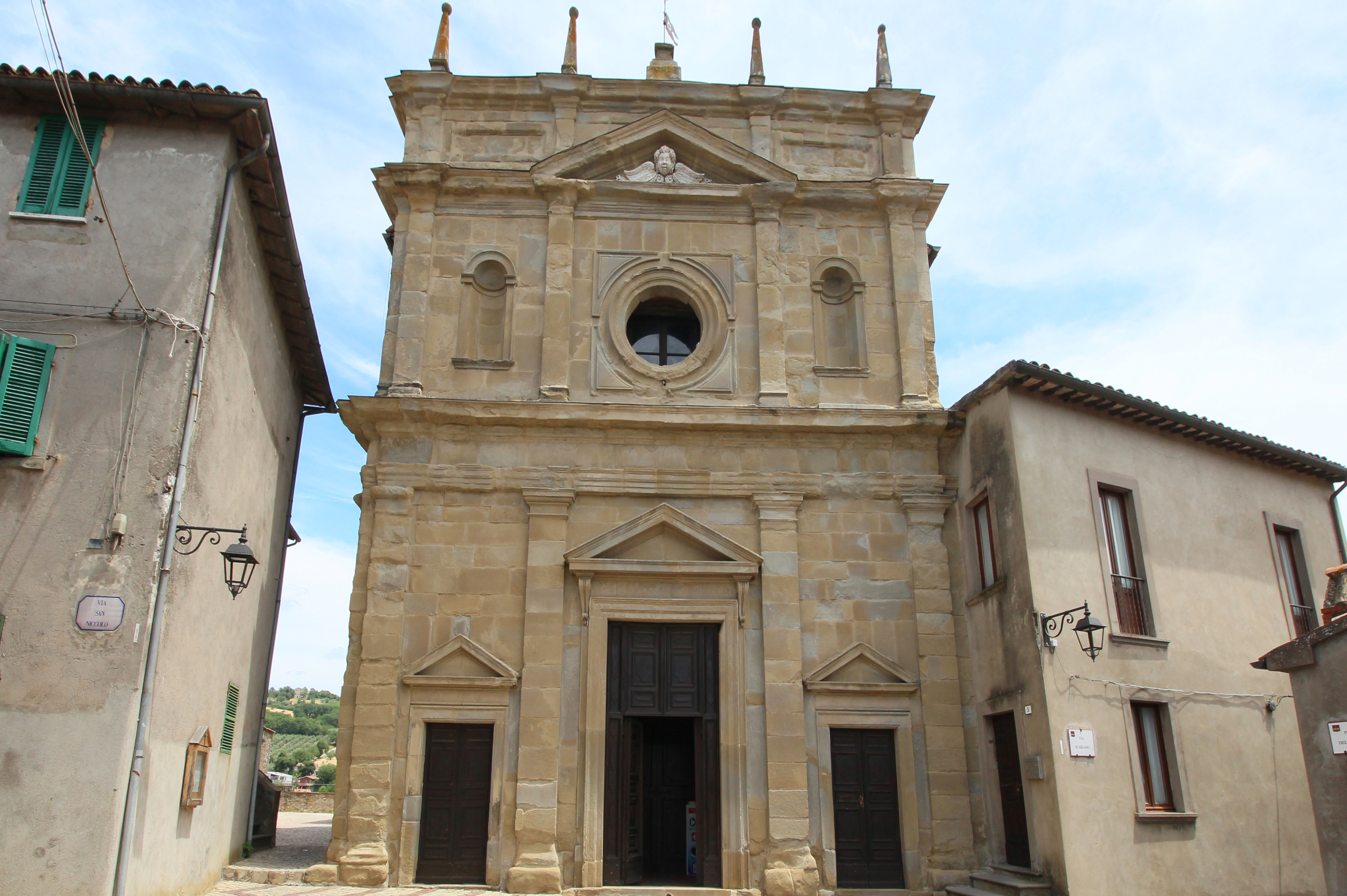
Church of San Niccolò

Among the principal religious buildings is the church of San Niccolò, constructed entirely of stone and left without internal plaster. An inscription dated 1523 is present. Inside, on the second altar on the left, there is a tempera triptych on a gold background depicting the Coronation of the Virgin, Saint Nicholas and other saints, attributed to an unknown 15th-century artist. The sacristy preserves a parish silver cross, worked in relief and decorated with figures of saints, dating to the 16th century.

Rebuilding of the church of San Nicolò began in 1576 on the site of an earlier church dating to the 12th century. The project was designed by Ippolito Scalza, who personally oversaw the work for about ten years and was replaced only in the final period by Antonio Carrarino during construction of the bell tower. The church was reportedly Scalza's first religious building, with a Tuscan character in both its interior and exterior.

The interior consists of a single hall with two chapels. Along the walls, pilasters frame arches and are topped by a windowed attic level. Basaltina gray stone and plaster contribute to the Tuscan, Brunelleschian character. The windows have interior finishing treated as if for an exterior surface, because the outer walls are rustic.

The large arch before the choir is of Bramantean inspiration. In the Chapel of the Santissimo Sacramento on the right is a triptych by the Sienese painter Giovanni di Paolo (1440) depicting the Madonna, Saint Nicholas, and another saint. Beneath the altar rests the body of Saint Longinus, co-patron of the town. The coffered ceiling was restored in the early 20th century; previously it was covered by a large cloth painted with the Madonna among angels above a large cloud and Saint Nicholas below. Above the central door, an organ was installed in the 18th century.

=== Santissima Annunziata ===
At Pantanelli, near Baschi, stands the church of the Santissima Annunziata, whose entrance is decorated with a fresco of the Annunciation attributed to Pinturicchio, though already noted as deteriorated in the late 19th century.

The former Franciscan monastery of Sant’Angelo di Pantanelli is traditionally associated with Saint Francis, who is said to have stayed there and spoken to the fishes in the nearby river.

=== Eremo della Pasquarella ===
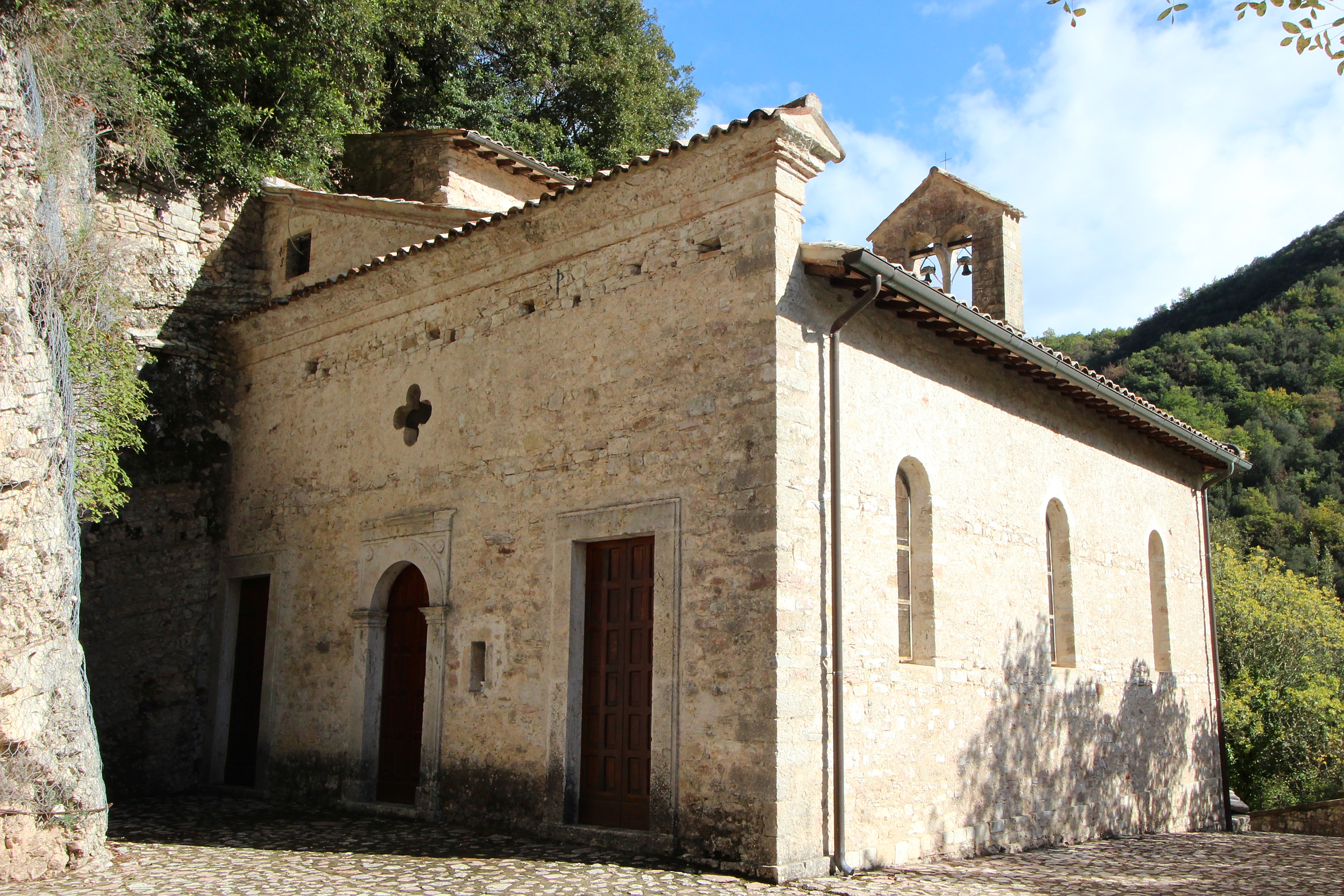
Eremo della Pasquarella

The Eremo della Pasquarella hermitage is located about 13 kilometres (8.1 mi) from Baschi, set among rock and dense vegetation. Its construction dates to the 11th century. The name Pasquarella is explained as deriving from "small Easter" or the first Easter of the year, Epiphany. Several legends about its origin are noted, including one in which inhabitants of Acqualoreto found an image of the Madonna and brought it to the parish church, but the image repeatedly returned to the bed of a ditch.

=== Religious traditions ===
The body of Saint Longinus is venerated as co-patron of the town, with his feast celebrated on 24 April. The feast of Saint Nicholas, the principal patron, is celebrated on 9 May.

== Culture ==
=== Antiquarium ===
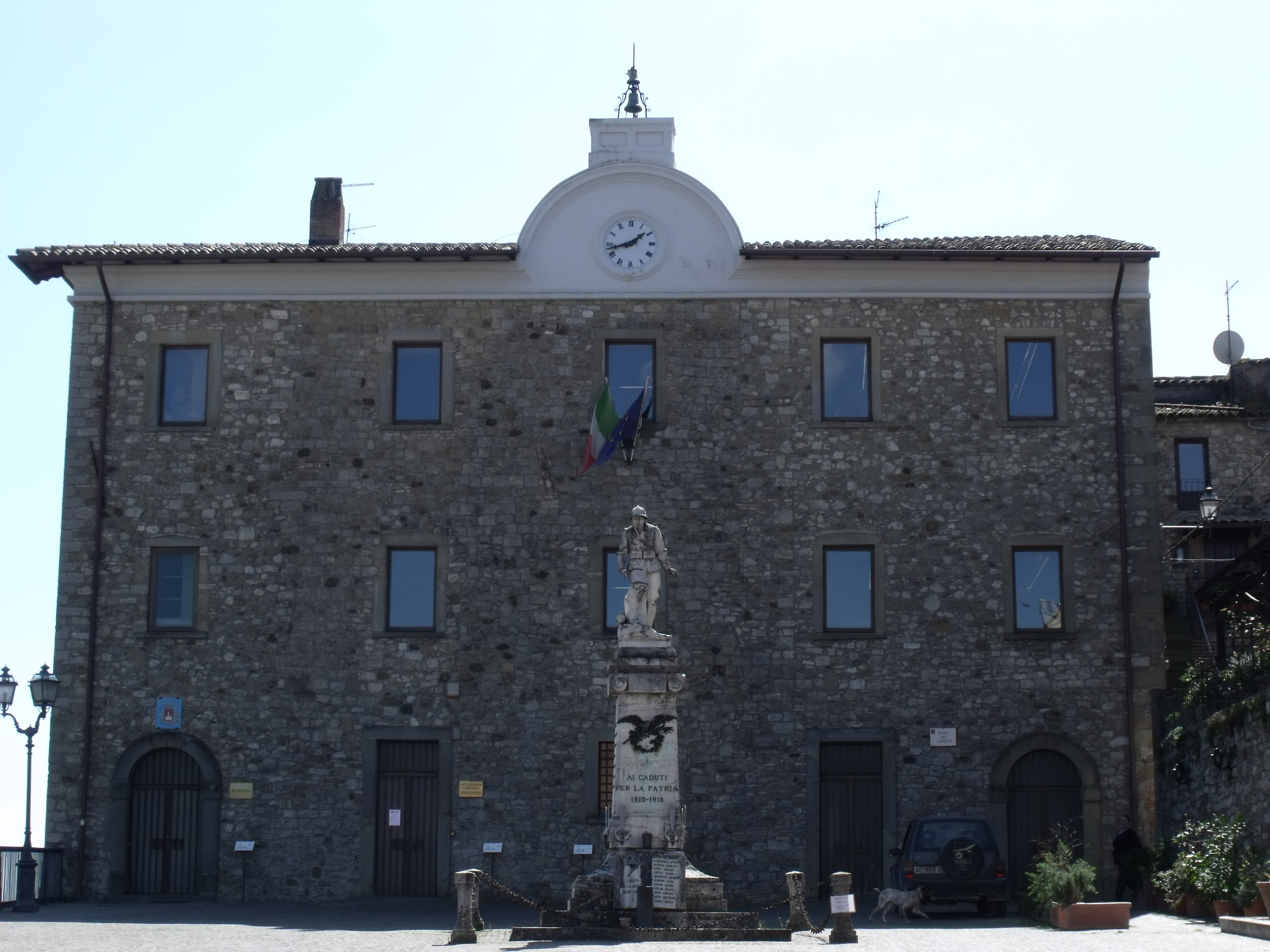
Townhall and Antiquarium of Baschi

The Antiquarium of Baschi preserves archaeological finds from a 1st-century AD Roman kiln discovered at Scoppieto. Archaeological investigations in Scoppieto since 1995 brought to light a 4th-century BC sanctuary, over which a ceramic production complex was established from the end of the 1st century BC. After production ceased, the area became a residential quarter until the 4th century AD.

The workshop operated for about a century and produced tableware known as terra sigillata. Alongside cups, mugs, plates, and bowls with a polished coral-red surface, the site also produced oil lamps and bricks. In the excavated area, aligned potters' stations were uncovered near a clay basin, a wheel, and a brazier. The other stages of production took place on site as well, from refining the clay to firing the products. Artisans' signatures on the ceramics are linked to a distribution network that spread the goods widely throughout the Mediterranean basin via the nearby Tiber river route.

The museum includes illustrated panels explaining stages of clay processing, maps to identify locations, and scale models of the kiln and transport ships. The first section is devoted to ceramic production and presents the stages involved in making terra sigillata, from extraction and settling of clay to shaping and firing of vessels. The second section focuses on trade and the spread of products made at Scoppieto in Italy and as far as Egypt. The third section consists of a photographic exhibition of archaeological finds discovered in earlier centuries in the local territory and now kept in various Italian museums.

=== Cultural heritage ===
The town retains many of its medieval elements. The present palazzo municipale was built at the site of a civic building from the 13th-century, refurbished in 1500 during the rule of Ranuccio dei Baschi.

== Notable people ==
The Baschi family is associated with the origin of the settlement and is traditionally regarded as its founding family.

Baschi is the birthplace of Gianfranco Vissani, a prominent Italian chef and television personality. Annibale Bugnini, a Catholic prelate who played a central role in the liturgical reforms that followed the Second Vatican Council, was also born there.
