= Apostolic Nunciature to Syria =

Diplomatic Mission of the Holy See in Syria

The Apostolic Nunciature to Syria is an ecclesiastical office of the Catholic Church in Syria. It is a diplomatic post of the Holy See, whose representative is called the Apostolic Nuncio with the rank of an ambassador.

== List of papal representatives to Syria ==
Apostolic Delegates

- Aloisio Gandolfi (11 August 1815 - 13 January 1818)
- Jean-Baptiste Auvergne (29 March 1833 - 7 September 1836)
- Giuseppe Angelo di Fazio (5 December 1837 - 13 December 1838)
- Francisco Villardel (8 March 1839 - 19 June 1852)
- Serafino Milani (23 January 1874 - 21 December 1874)
- Luigi Piavi (14 November 1876 - 28 August 1889)
- Gaudenzio Bonfigli (19 Aug 1890 - 25 February 1896)
- Pierre-Gonzalès-Charles Duval (25 February 1896 - 31 July 1904)
- Frediano Giannini (20 January 1905 - 12 February 1936)
- Rémy-Louis Leprêtre (18 March 1936 - 7 May 1947)

Apostolic Internuncios

- Paolo Pappalardo (19 March 1953 - 1958)
- Luigi Punzolo (10 January 1962 - 17 June 1967)
  - became Apostolic Pro-Nuncio on 2 February 1966

Apostolic Pro-Nuncios

- Raffaele Forni (17 June 1967 - 19 September 1969)
- Achille Glorieux (19 September 1969 - 3 August 1973)
- Amelio Poggi (26 September 1973 - 23 December 1974)
- Angelo Pedroni (15 March 1975 - 6 July 1983)
- Nicola Rotunno (30 August 1983 - 8 December 1987)

Apostolic Nuncios

- Luigi Accogli (17 June 1988 - 11 February 1993)
- Pier Giacomo De Nicolò (11 February 1993 - 21 January 1999)
- Diego Causero (31 March 1999 - 10 January 2004)
- Giovanni Battista Morandini (6 March 2004 - 21 September 2008)
- Mario Zenari (30 December 2008 – 02 February 2026)
- Luigi Roberto Cona (19 March 2026 - present)
