= Terra Sancta Museum =

Museum in the Old City of Jerusalem

Coordinates: 31°46′50″N 35°14′02″E

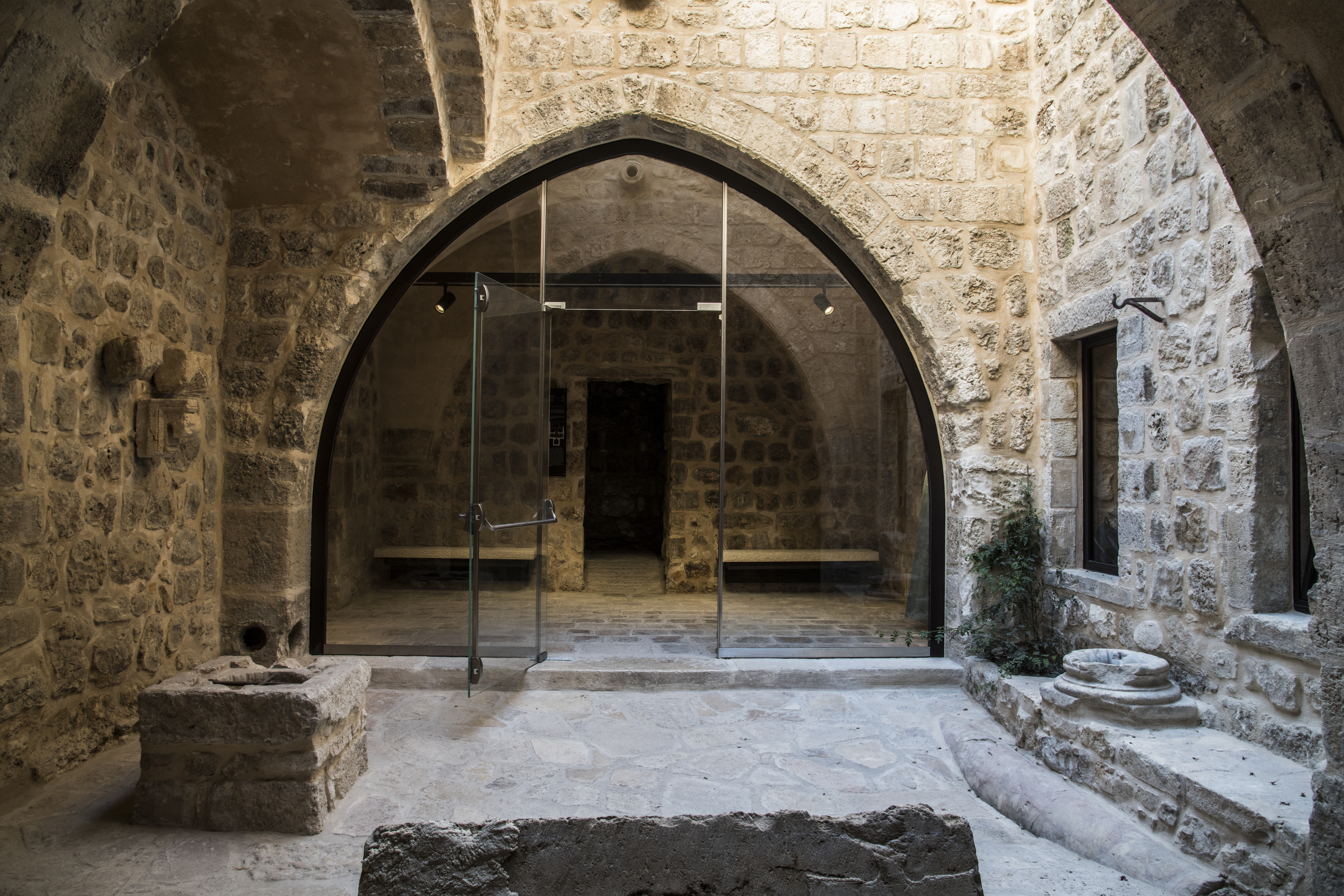
Court yard of the Terra Sancta Museum in Jerusalem

The Terra Sancta Museum is a network of museums managed by the Custody of the Holy Land and located in the Old City of Jerusalem. It originated from the first "Museum of the Franciscan Fathers" opened in 1902 to exhibit the results of archaeological excavations conducted in the Holy Land by the Studium Biblicum Franciscanum. Today it includes the Terra Sancta Museum - Archaeology situated at the Church of the Flagellation and the Terra Sancta Museum - Art and History located at the Monastery of Saint Saviour.

== Terra Sancta Museum - SBF Archaeological Museum ==
As the successor to the original museum established in Jerusalem in 1902 by Custos Frediano Giannini, this museum displays the history of the Holy Land and the origins of Christianity through the exhibition of finds from excavations conducted by Franciscan archaeologists of the SBF, as well as objects donated to the museum.

The museum's collections are displayed in three wings :

- The immersive "Via Dolorosa" room presents a multimedia experience that traces more than 2000 years of the history of Jerusalem in 15 minutes, set within the archaeological area traditionally identified as the Antonia Fortress and the Praetorium of Pilate.
- The "Saller Wing," named after the archaeologist and the museum's first director at the Flagellation Sanctuary, Fr. Sylvester Saller, offers a museographic journey centered around the life of Jesus Christ, from the remnants of Nazareth to the Holy Sepulchre. It also features a collection of archaeological findings spanning from the Bronze Age to the Crusader period.
- The "Corbo Wing," named in tribute to the Franciscan scholar and archaeologist Fr. Virgilio Corbo, is dedicated to the political institutions and everyday life during the New Testament period as well as to the early monastic movement in the Holy Land. It also showcases on the first floor inscriptions, Byzantine oil lamps, bronzes, glassware, the Egyptian collection, and other artifacts of Christian, Jewish, and Islamic art.
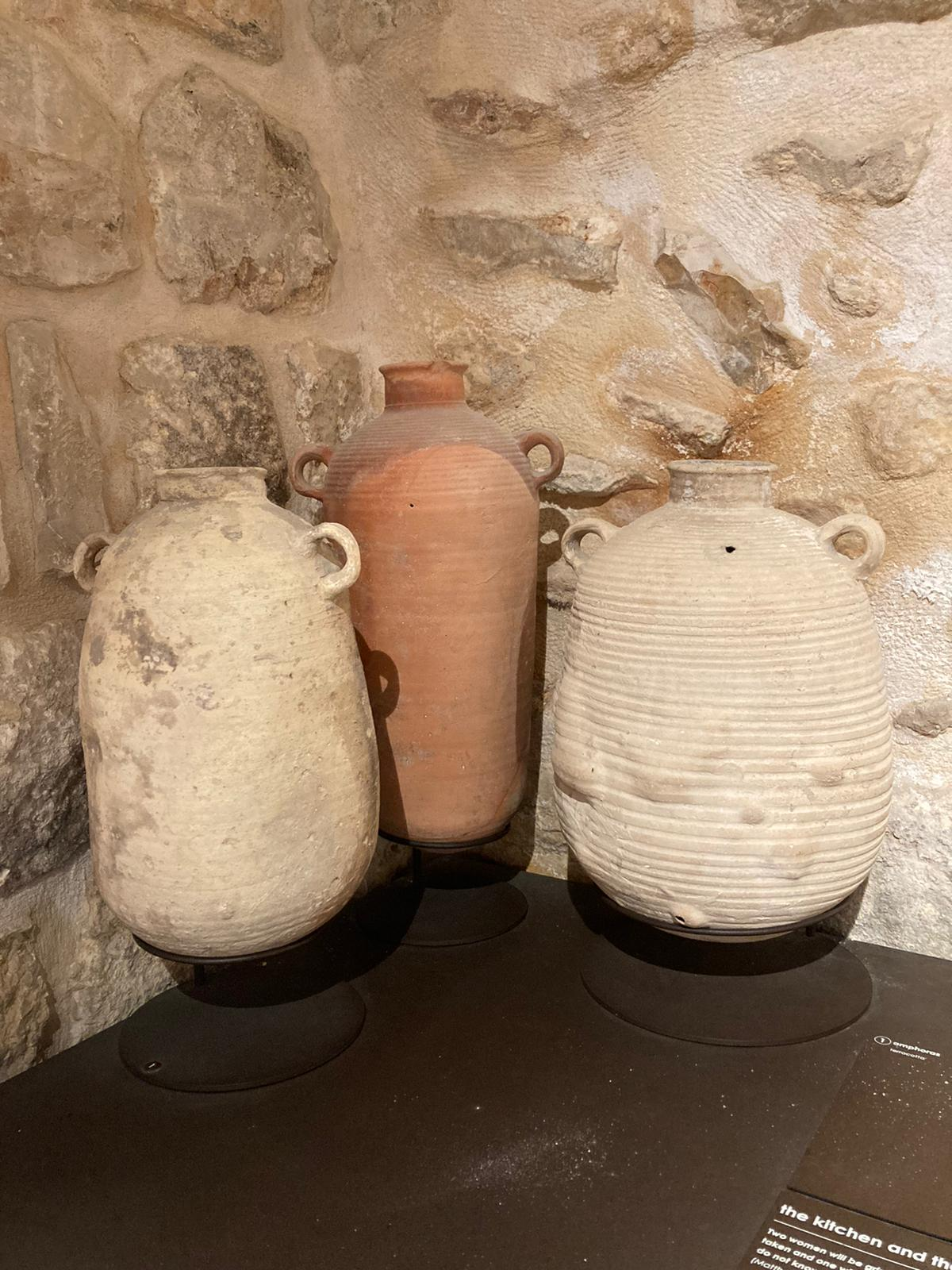
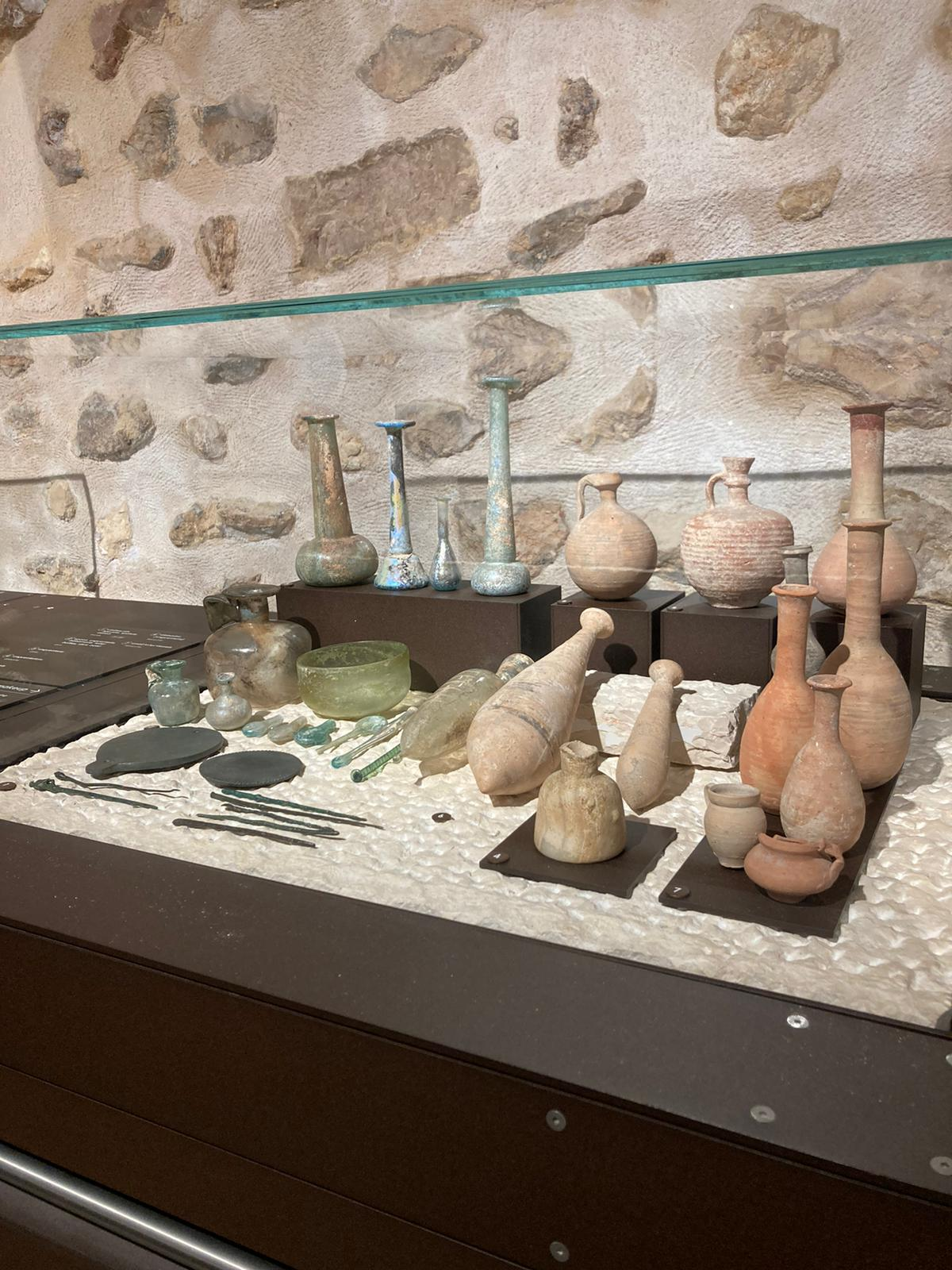
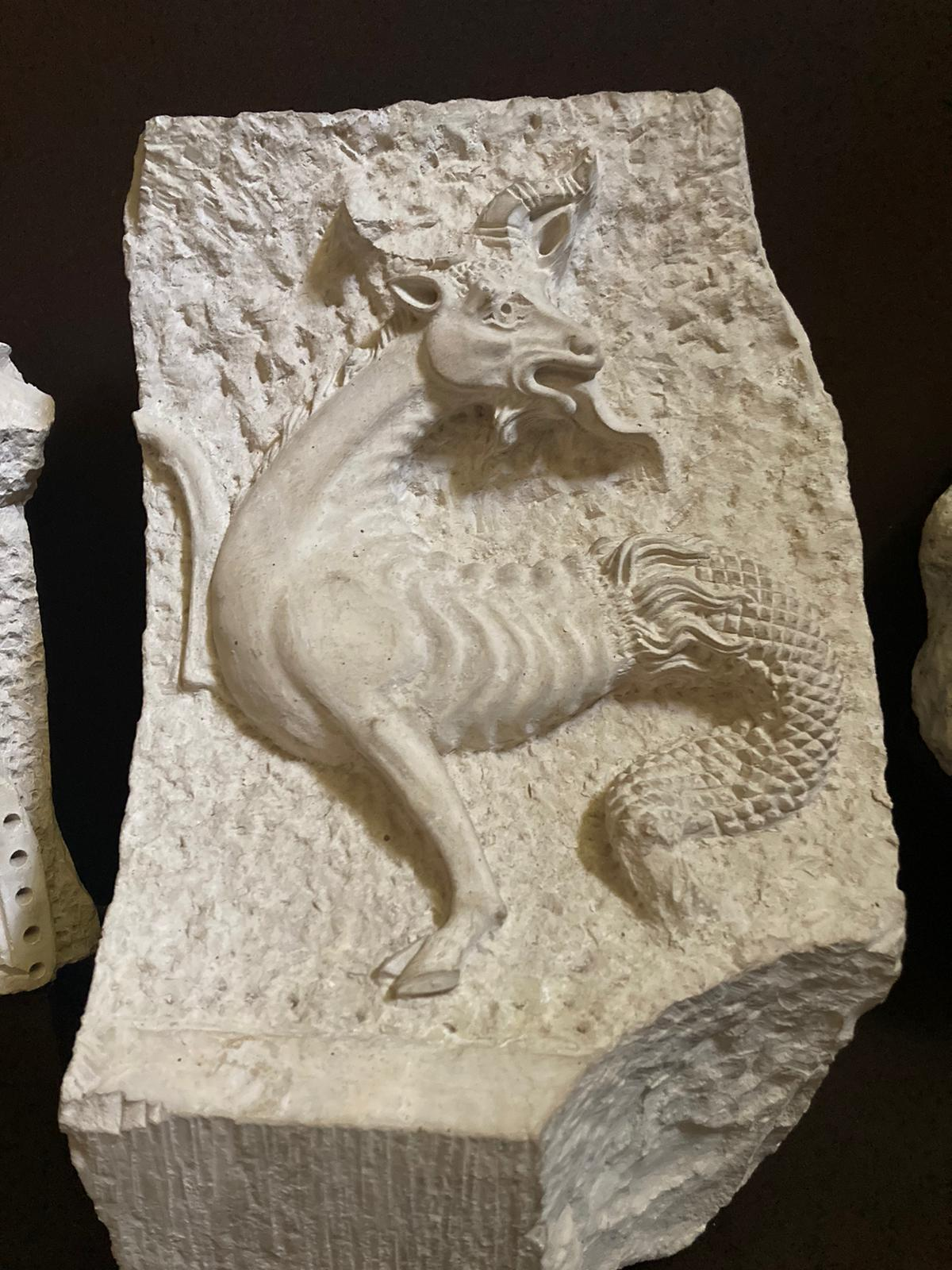
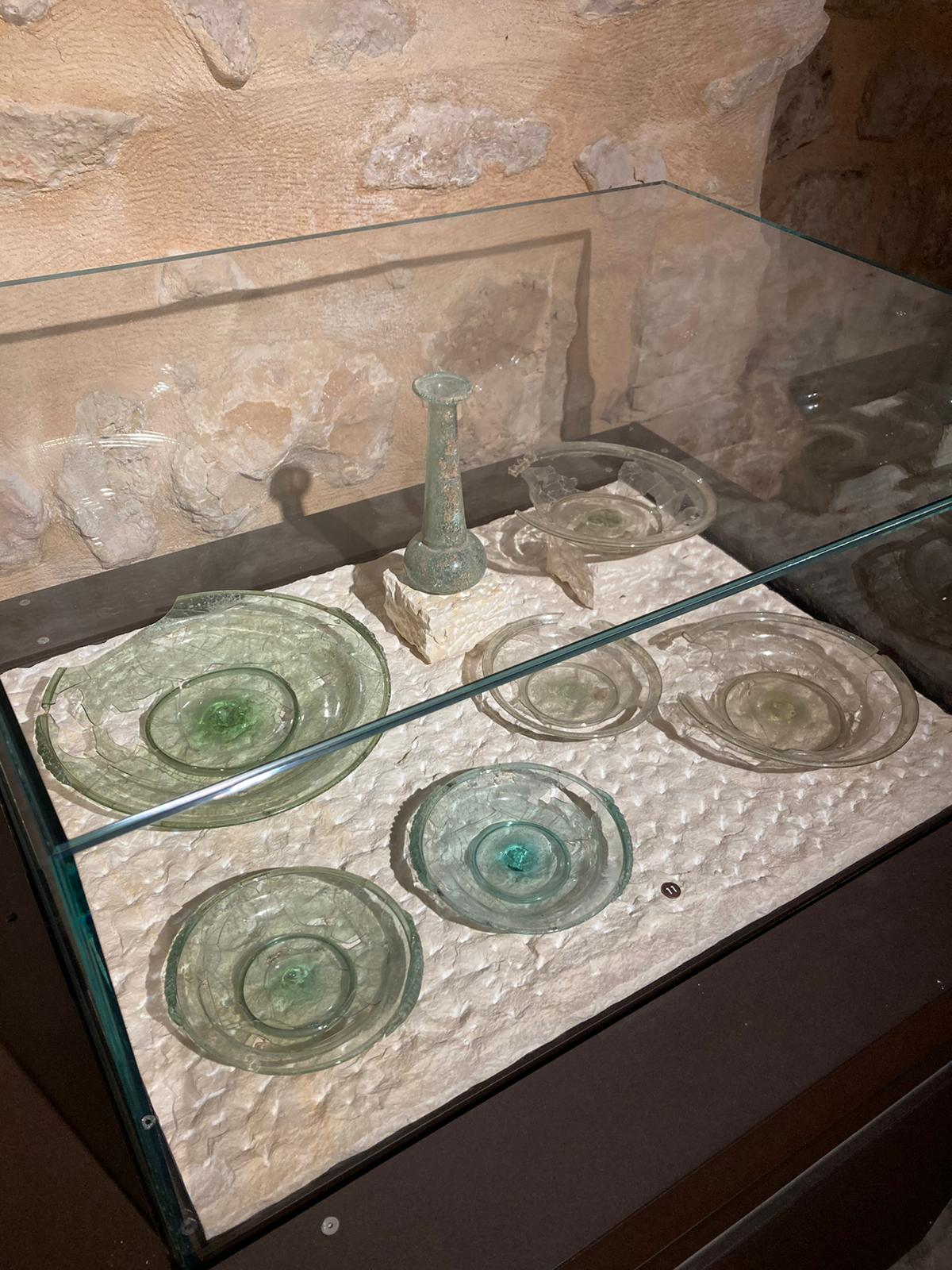
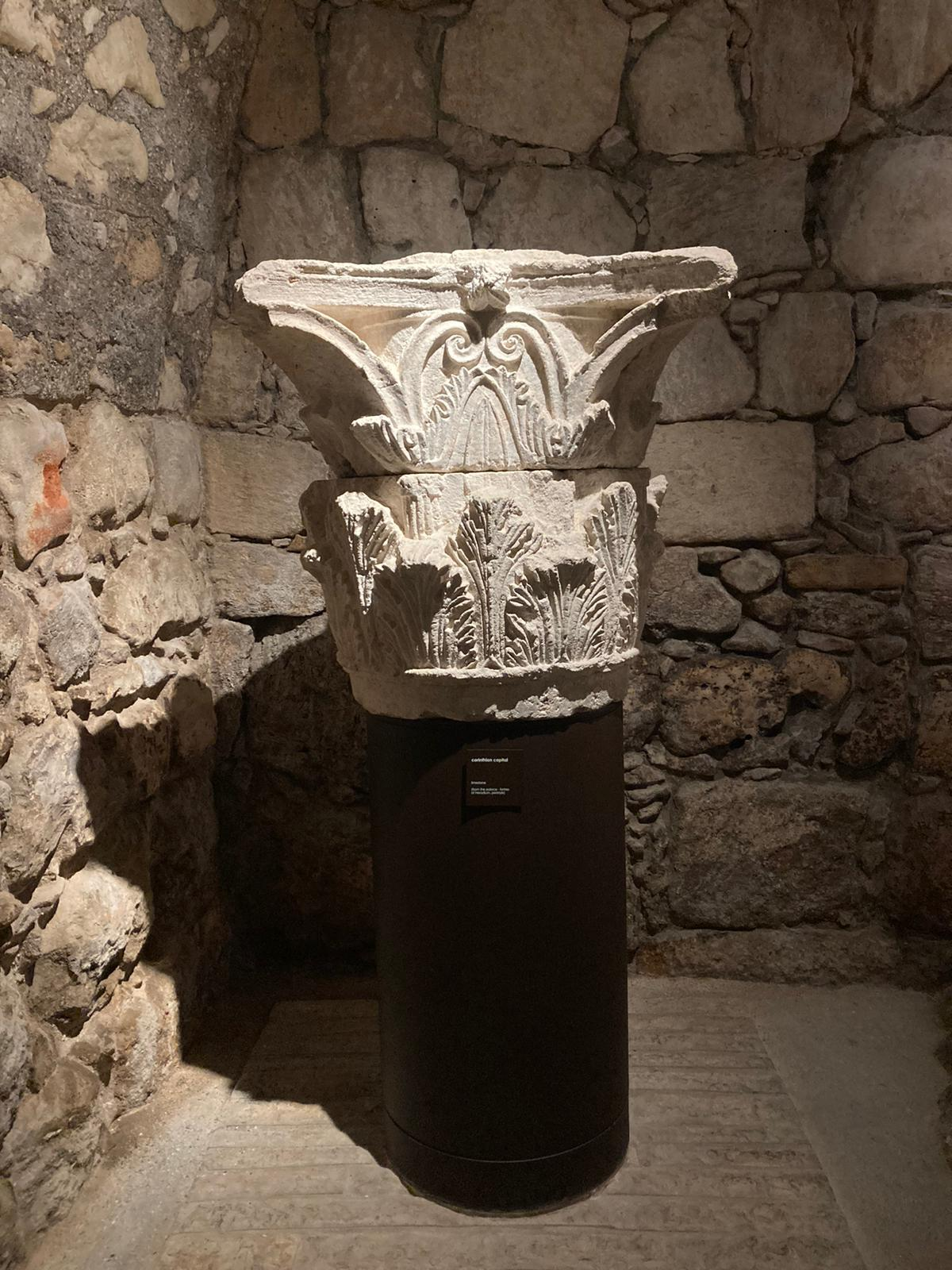
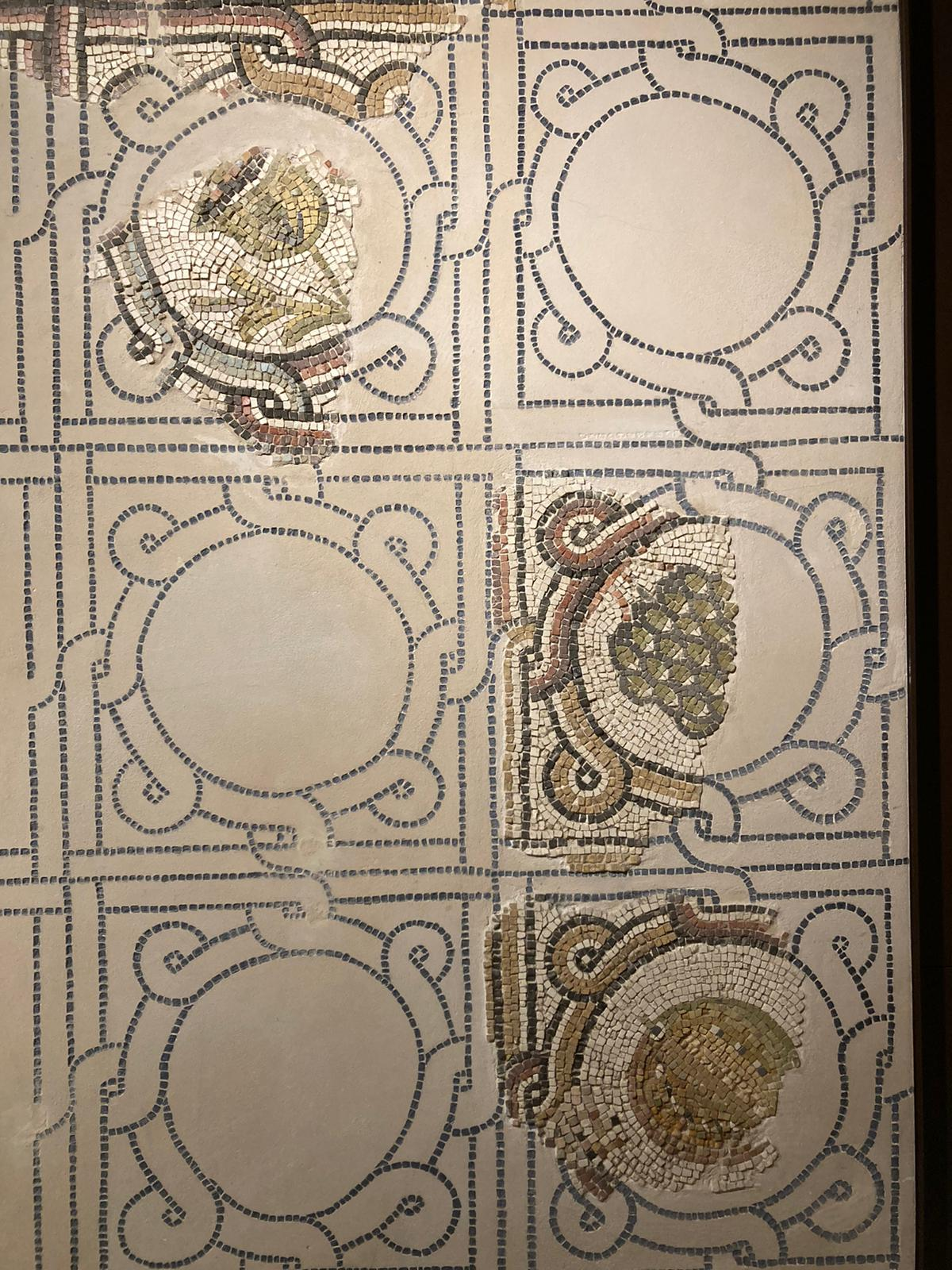
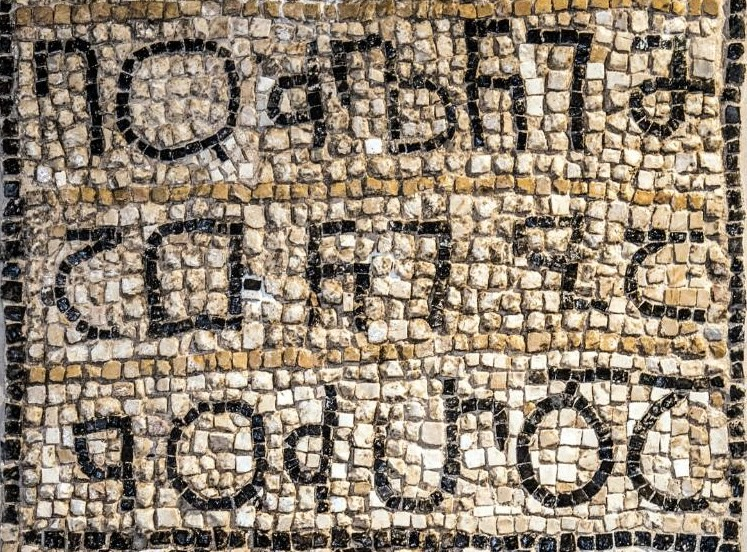
  Bir el Qutt mosaic

== Terra Sancta Museum - Art and History ==
This museum is currently under construction at the Monastery of Saint Saviour located in the Old City of Jerusalem. The launch of this project was officially announced on March 10, 2013, by Pierbattista Pizzaballa, the Custos of the Holy Land at that time. The museum's construction work began in 2018, with an opening to the public anticipated in 2027.

The Terra Sancta Museum - Art and History will display the artistic and cultural heritage preserved by the Custody of the Holy Land from the Middle Ages to the contemporary period. These collections have been showcased to audiences worldwide during several exhibitions while awaiting the museum's opening, notably in France at the Palace of Versailles in 2013, and in Lisbon at the Calouste Gulbenkian Museum in 2023.

The museum's collections will be displayed in three sections :

- The section on Eastern Christian art will showcase icons, textiles, jewelry, and mother-of-pearl artifacts. This part of the museum will illustrate the depth of the bonds forged between the Custody of the Holy Land and the local populations, as well as the richness of the heritage stemming from Palestinian craftsmanship.
- The section on the History and Missions of the Custody of the Holy Land will display a collection of objects related to the Franciscan presence in the Holy Land since the 13th century. On show will be precious liturgical objects from the Crusader period, a rich collection of instruments from the monastery's ancient pharmacy, documents and manuscripts from the archives of the Custody of the Holy Land, and a set of items linked to the Order of the Holy Sepulchre.
- The section on the "Treasure of the Holy Sepulchre" will display donations made to the Custody of the Holy Land by numerous Catholic sovereigns over the centuries. This unique heritage comprises artistic works of silverware, textiles, and furniture intended for use during worship or to decorate religious spaces, sent by leaders such as Philip II of Spain, Louis XIV of France, John V of Portugal, Charles VII of Naples, and Maria Theresa of Austria.
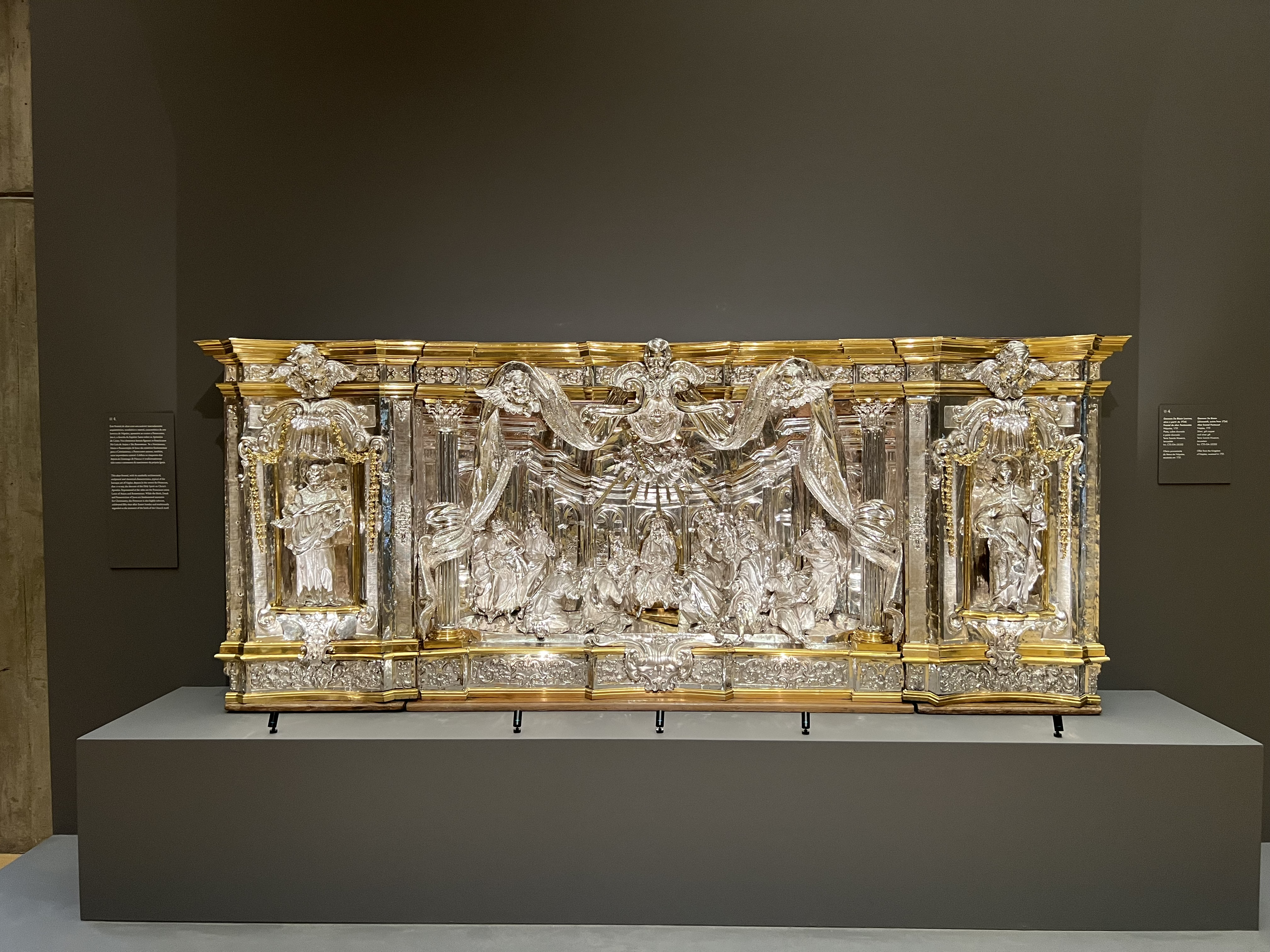
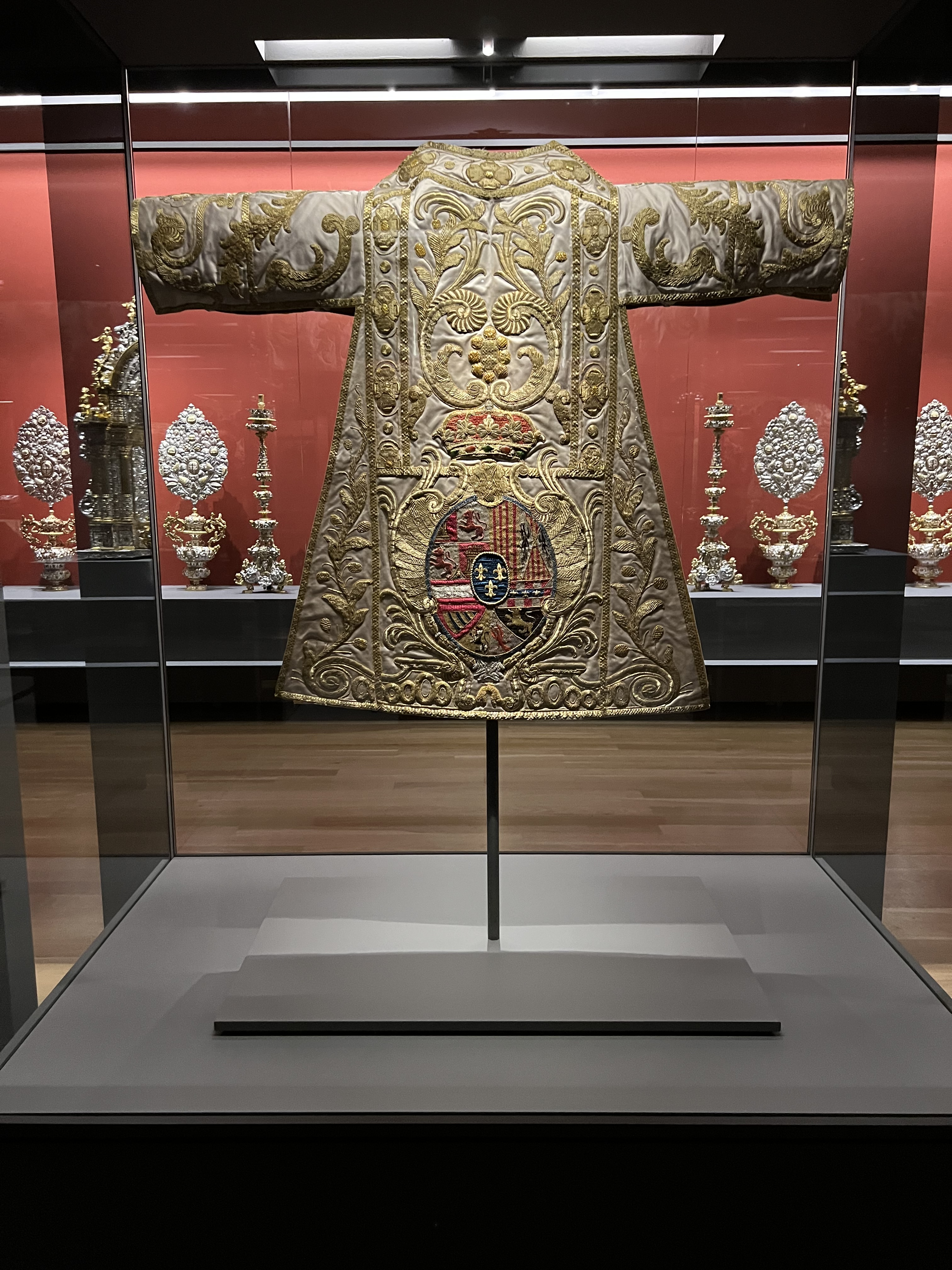
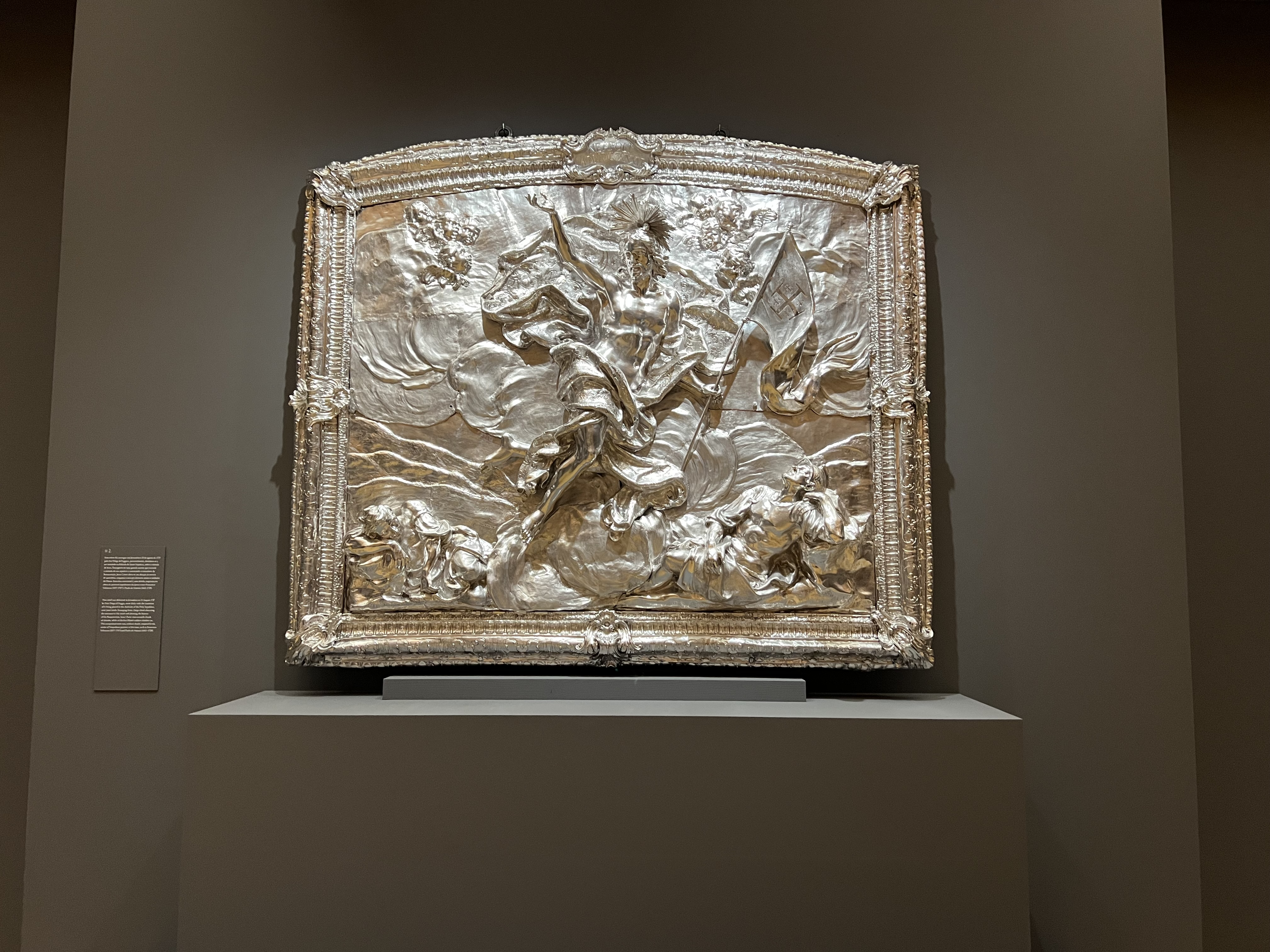
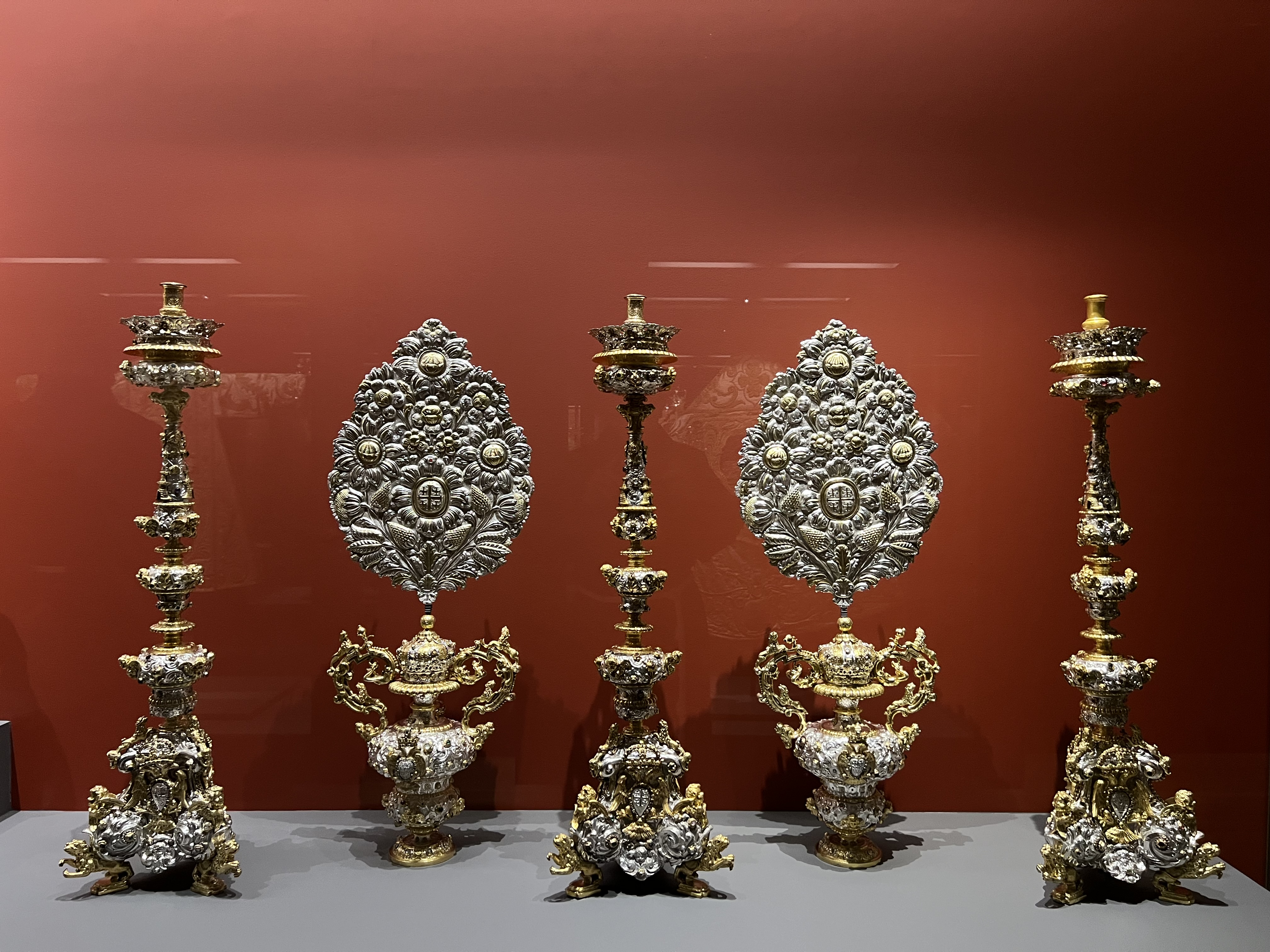
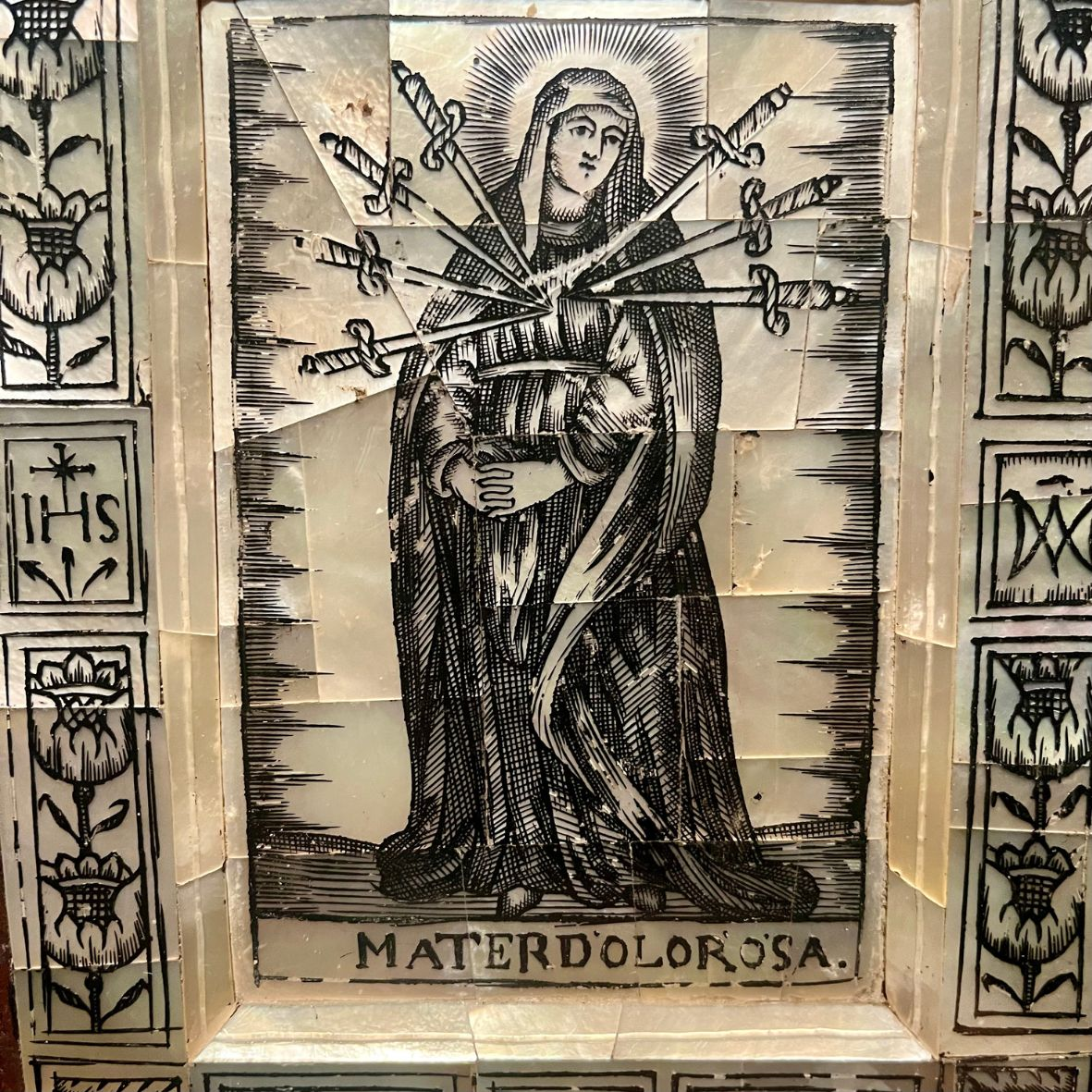
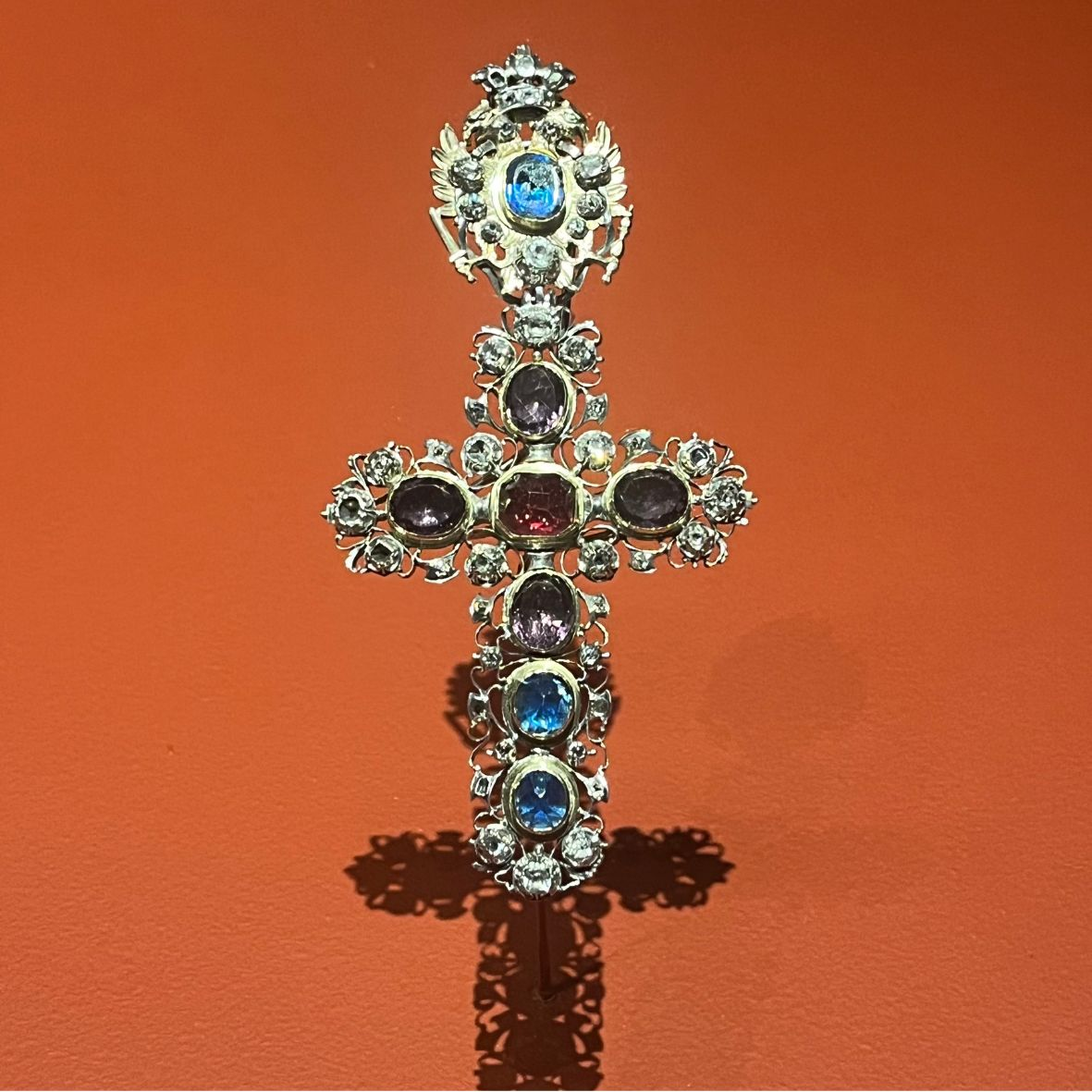

== Selected Exhibitions with Museum Collections ==
- 1925: Esposizione Missionaria Vaticana, Vatican City, Rome
- 1992: Genova nell'Età Barocca, Galleria Nazionale di Palazzo Spinola, Genova, Italy
- 1995: Die Reise nach Jerusalem, Jüdische Gemeinde zu Berlin, Berlin, Germany
- 1997: The Glory of Byzantium, Metropolitan Museum of Art, New York, USA
- 1997: Voir Jérusalem, Pèlerins, Conquérants, Voyageurs, Inalco, Paris, France
- 1999: Knights of the Holy Land - The Crusader Kingdom of Jerusalem, The Israel Museum, Jerusalem
- 2000: In Terrasanta. Dalla Crociata alla Custodia dei Luoghi Santi, Palazzo Reale, Milan, Italy
- 2003: Il Medioevo europeo di Jacques Le Goff, Galleria Nazionale, Parma, Italy
- 2005: Made In Belgium, Brussels, Belgium
- 2006: L'uomo del Rinascimento. Leon Battista Alberti e le Arti a Firenze tra Ragione e Bellezza, Palazzo Strozzi, Florence, Italy
- 2007: Dead Sea Scrolls & Birth of Christianity, Seoul, South Korea
- 2010: Une chapelle pour le roi, Château de Versailles, Versailles, France
- 2013: Trésor du Saint Sépulcre, Château de Versailles, Versailles, France
- 2014: Barocco dal Santo Sepolcro, Galleria Canesso, Lugano, Switzerland
- 2015: Hong Kong (Hadavar Yeshiva), Hadavar Yeshiva (for the Nations), New Territories, Hong Kong
- 2015: L'arte di Francesco, Galleria dell'Accademia, Florence, Italy
- 2016: Arte sacra contemporanea, Montevarchi, Italy
- 2016: Jerusalem 1000–1400. Every people under heaven, Metropolitan Museum of Art, New York, USA
- 2017: Faces of Palmira in Aquileia, Archeological National Museum, Aquileia, Italy
- 2017: Chrétiens d’Orient, 2000 ans d’histoire, Institut du Monde Arabe, Paris, France
- 2017: Souffle sur la création, Church of Saint Germain l'Auxerrois, Paris, France
- 2019: The Radziwills. History and legacy of the princes, National Museum, Vilnius, Lithuania
- 2023: Treasures from Kings: Masterpieces from the Terra Sancta Museum, Museu Calouste Gulbenkian, Lisbon, Portugal
- 2024: Tesouros de Xerusalén en Santiago. Doazóns reais á Custodia franciscana de Terra Santa, Fundación Cidade da Cultura de Galicia, Santiago de Compostela, Spain
- 2024: Il Tesoro Di Terrasanta. La bellezza del Sacro: l'Altare dei Medici e i doni dei Re, Museo Marino Marini, Florence, Italy
- 2025: To the Holy Sepulcher: Treasures from the Terra Sancta Museum in Jerusalem,Frick Collection - New York (USA)
