= Paolino =

Paolino is a given name and a surname. Notable people with the name include:

== Given name ==
- Paolino Bertaccini (born 1997), Belgian football player
- Paolino Dimai, Italian speed skater
- Paolino Limongi (1914–1967), Italian prelate
- Paolino Taddei (1860-1925), Italian politician
- Paolino Tomaino, Italian Catholic priest who served in Uganda for more than 50 years
- Paolino Vassallo
- Paolino Veneto (died 1344), Franciscan historian

== Surname ==
- Frank Paolino, Australian politician
- Joseph R. Paolino Jr. (born 1955), American politician and diplomat
- Margaux Paolino (born 1997), American women's field hockey player
- Thomas J. Paolino (1905–1987), justice of the Rhode Island Supreme Court

== See also ==
- San Paolino (disambiguation)
