= Achille Glorieux =

Catholic archbishop

- Apostolic Pro-Nuncio to Egypt
- Church: Catholic Church
- In office: 3 August 1973 – 1984
- Predecessor: Bruno Heim
- Successor: Giovanni Moretti
- Other post: Titular Archbishop of Beverlacum (1969-1999)
- Previous posts: Apostolic Pro-Nuncio to Syria (1969-1973); Secretary for the Pontifical Council for the Laity 1966-1969

Orders
- Ordination: 29 June 1934 by Jean Verdier
- Consecration: 9 November 1969 by Jean-Marie Villot

Personal details
- Born: Achille Marie Joseph Glorieux; 2 April 1910 Roubaix, Nord, France
- Died: 27 September 1999 (aged 89) Lille, Nord, France

Styles of Achille Marie Joseph Glorieux
- Reference style: The Most Reverend Excellency
- Spoken style: His Excellency
- Religious style: Monsignor

Achille Marie Joseph Glorieux (2 April 1910 – 27 September 1999) was a French prelate who held diplomatic posts of the Catholic Church.

== Biography ==
Achille Marie Joseph Glorieux was born in Roubaix, France, on 2 April 1910, one of ten children born to Achille Glorieux (1883–1965), an industrial leader prominent in the Catholic social movement that promoted large families to fight underpopulation.

He was ordained a priest on 29 June 1934.

While working in Rome at the Secretariat of State, he was also the Vatican correspondent for the French daily La Croix in the 1930s. He fled Italy after the declaration of war between Italy and France in 1940 and continued his work from Limoges. He returned to Rome in 1945 and managed the French-language edition of L'Osservatore Romano.

Pope John XXIII named him secretary of the commission responsible for planning the Second Vatican Council. There he played a key role–as a cheville-ouvrière or linchpin–in recruiting lay organizations to contribute to the commission's work.

Pope Paul VI appointed him Secretary of the Pontifical Council for the Laity in July 1966. In that role he wrote a study of the council's declaration on the role of the laity in the Church, Apostolicam Actuositatem.

Although Glorieux had neither trained in the traditional manner nor followed the customary career path of a senior Vatican diplomat, Pope Paul appointed him Titular Archbishop of Beverlacum and Apostolic Pro-Nuncio to Syria on 19 September 1969. His episcopal consecration took place on 9 November 1969; the principal consecrator was Jean-Marie Villot, Cardinal Secretary of State, and the principal co-consecrators were Alberto Castelli, Vice President of the Pontifical Council for the Laity, and Adrien-Edmond-Maurice Gand, Bishop of Lille.

Glorieux was appointed the Apostolic Pro-Nuncio to Egypt on 3 August 1973 and resigned the post in 1984.

In 1985 he preached the Lenten spiritual exercises for the Roman Curia.

He died in Lille on 27 September 1999, aged 89.

Catholic Church titles
New title	Titular Archbishop of Beverlacum; 1969–1999	Succeeded by John Franklin Meldon Hine as Titular Bishop of Beverlacum
Diplomatic posts
Preceded by Raffaele Forni	Apostolic Pro-Nuncio to Syria; 1969–1973	Succeeded by Amelio Poggi
Preceded by Bruno Bernard Heim	Apostolic Pro-Nuncio to Egypt; 1973–1984	Succeeded by Giovanni Moretti
