= Alcide Marina =

Italian prelate

Alcide Marina C.M.
- Apostolic Nuncio to Lebanon
- Church: Catholic Church
- In office: 22 March 1947 – 17 September 1950
- Predecessor: Position established
- Successor: Giuseppe Beltrami
- Other post: Titular Archbishop of Heliopolis in Phoenicia (1936-1950)
- Previous posts: Apostolic Delegate to Turkey (1945-1947); Apostolic Delegate to Persia (1936-1945)

Orders
- Ordination: 18 December 1909
- Consecration: 24 May 1936 by Eugenio Maria Giuseppe Giovanni Pacelli

Personal details
- Born: Alcide Giuseppe Marina; 24 March 1887 Santimento, Rottofreno, Province of Piacenza, Kingdom of Italy
- Died: 17 September 1950 (aged 63) Rome, Italy

Alcide Giuseppe Marina, C.M. (24 March 1887 – 17 September 1950) was an Italian prelate of the Catholic Church who worked as an educator and superior of the Vincentians until 1936 and then in the diplomatic service of the Holy See.

== Biography ==
Alcide Marina was born in Santimento, a village near Piacenza, Italy, on 24 March 1887. He studied at the local seminary and then at the Collegio Alberoni. He took his first vows as a Vincentian on 25 December 1906 and then studied at the congregation's seminary at Montecitorio in Rome. After an interruption of his studies for military service, he was ordained a priest on 18 December 1909. He then taught at the Alberoni and at San Jacopo in Florence. He returned to the military from 1915 to 1919 as a chaplain during World War I.

After the war he returned to teaching and began his fifteen years in charge of the Vincentians' principal Italian-language publication, the Annali della Mission, moving its operations to Rome, where he directed the Pontifical Liturgical Academy and as editor transformed Ephemerides Liturgicae, the oldest international Catholic journal regarding the liturgy, a publication that had close links to the Congregation for Rites. From 1921 to 1932 he headed the Collegio Alberoni as well. There he initiated a revival of studies devoted to Thomas Aquinas and undertook the translation into Italian of the works of the founder of the Congregation of the Mission, St Vincent de Paul, as well as the expansion of its science program and art gallery. (Note: His work at Alberoni was crucial in the formation of the liturgist Annibale Bugnini.) As Provincial superior he led the Roman province of the Vincentians from 1932 to 1936.

On 7 March 1936, Pope Pius XI appointed him a titular archbishop and Apostolic Delegate to Iran. He received his episcopal consecration on 24 May 1936 at the hands of the Secretary of State Cardinal Eugenio Pacelli.

On 18 April 1945, Pope Pius reassigned Marina to be Apostolic Delegate to Turkey and again on 22 March to be Apostolic Nuncio to Lebanon. He was also Apostolic Administrator of Constantinople from 1945 to 18 May 1947.

He died in Rome on 17 September 1950 at the age of 63.

A street in Piacenza is named for him, Via Alcide Marina.
