= Roman Catholic Diocese of Beverley =

Historical diocese of the Roman Catholic Church in England

Diocese of Beverley Dioecesis Beverlacensis
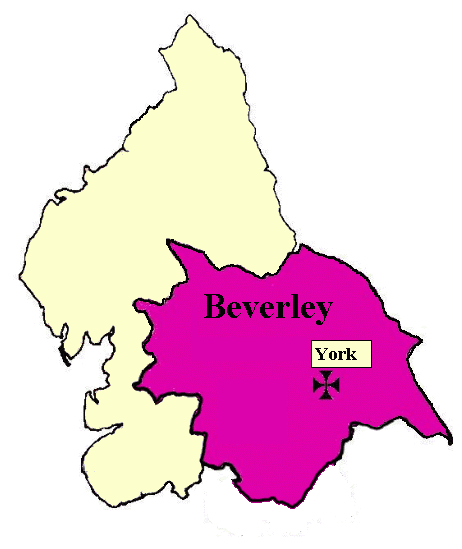

Location
- Country: England
- Territory: Most of Yorkshire

Information
- Denomination: Roman Catholic
- Rite: Latin Rite
- Established: 29 September 1850
- Cathedral: Firstly: St George's, York; Secondly: St Wilfrid's, York
- Patron saints: The Blessed Virgin Mary and St John of Beverley

The Roman Catholic Diocese of Beverley is an historical diocese of the Roman Catholic Church in England. It took its name after St John of Beverley, an 8th century bishop of York. The episcopal see was located in the city of York. The diocese was established in 1850 and was replaced by the dioceses of Leeds and Middlesbrough in 1878. It was restored as a titular see in 1969.

== History ==
The Apostolic Vicariate of the Yorkshire District was created out of the Northern District on 11 May 1840. As its name implied, it comprised most of the Yorkshire area.

On the restoration of the hierarchy in England and Wales by Pope Pius IX, the Yorkshire District was elevated to the Diocese of Beverley on 29 September 1850. The pro-cathedral was located first at St George's, York, and then at St Wilfrid's, York. Twenty-eight years later, the diocese was suppressed on 20 December 1878 and its area was divided into the dioceses of Leeds and Middlesbrough.

== Titular see ==
The titular see of Beverley (latine: Beverlacum; Latin: Beverlacensis) was restored by the Roman Catholic Church in 1969. The current titular bishop is the Right Reverend Gerard Bradley who serves as an auxiliary bishop in Archdiocese of Southwark.

== List of Ordinaries ==
=== Vicar Apostolic of the Yorkshire District ===
Vicar Apostolic of the Yorkshire District
From	Until	Incumbent	Notes
1840	1850	John Briggs, Titular Bishop of Trachis	Formerly Vicar Apostolic of the Northern District (1836–1840). Appointed Vicar Apostolic of the Yorkshire District on 3 July 1840. Became the first Bishop of Beverley on 29 September 1850 when the Yorkshire District became the Diocese of Beverley.
In 1850, the district changed its name when it was elevated to diocese status.

=== Diocesan Bishops of Beverley ===
Bishops of Beverley
From	Until	Incumbent	Notes
1850	1860	John Briggs	Formerly Vicar Apostolic of the Yorkshire District (1840–1850). Appointed Bishop of Beverley on 29 September 1850. Retired on 17 September 1860 and died on 4 January 1861.
1861	1878	Robert Cornthwaite	Appointed Bishop of Beverley on 3 September 1861 and consecrated on 10 November 1861. Translated to the newly formed Diocese of Leeds on 20 June 1878.
In 1878, the title was suppressed and replaced by the bishoprics of Leeds and Middlesbrough

=== Titular Bishops and Archbishops of Beverley ===
Titular Bishops and Archbishops of Beverley
From	Until	Incumbent	Notes
1969	1999	Achille Glorieux	Appointed Titular Archbishop of Beverley on 19 September 1969 and consecrated on 9 November 1969. Served as Apostolic Pro-Nuncio to Syria (1969–1973) and Apostolic Pro-Nuncio to Egypt (1973–1984). Died on 27 September 1999.
1999	2001	Titular see vacant	
2001	2024	John Franklin Meldon Hine	Appointed Titular Bishop of Beverley on 26 January 2001 and consecrated on 27 February 2001. Served as an Auxiliary Bishop in the Archdiocese of Southwark (26 January 2001 – 7 May 2016). Died on 16 November 2024.
2024	2025	Titular see vacant	
2025	present	Gerard Bradley	Appointed Titular Bishop of Beverley on 22 December 2025 and consecrated on 2 February 2026. Serves as an Auxiliary Bishop in the Archdiocese of Southwark (since 22 December 2025).

== See also ==
- Bishop of Beverley (Anglican Provincial Episcopal Visitor)
- List of former cathedrals in Great Britain

== Bibliography ==
- Brady, W. Maziere (1876). The Episcopal Succession in England, Scotland and Ireland, A.D. 1400 to 1875. Vol. 3. Rome: Tipografia Della Pace.
