= Raffaele Forni =

Swiss prelate

- Titular Archbishop of Aegina
- Church: Catholic Church
- In office: 31 July 1953 – 29 September 1990
- Predecessor: Saverio Ritter
- Successor: vacant
- Previous posts: Apostolic Pro-Nuncio to Syria (1967-1969); Secretary of State (1965-1967); Apostolic Nuncio to Uruguay (1960-1965); Apostolic Nuncio to Venezuela (1955-1960); Apostolic Internuncio to Iran (1953-1955)

Orders
- Ordination: 29 July 1934
- Consecration: 13 September 1953 by Eugène Tisserant

Personal details
- Born: 24 May 1906 Villa Bedretto, Switzerland
- Died: 29 September 1990 (aged 84) Lugano, Switzerland

Raffaele Forni (24 May 1906 – 29 September 1990) was a Swiss prelate of the Catholic Church who worked in the diplomatic service of the Holy See. He held the title of archbishop from 1953 and served a nuncio to Iran, Venezuela, Uruguay, and Syria.

== Biography ==
Raffaele Forni was born to Giuseppe and Emilia Forni on 24 May 1906 in Villa Bedretto, Canton of Ticino, Switzerland. He studied at the lycée in Lugano and earned degrees in philosophy at the Catholic University of Milan and in theology in Fribourg. He was ordained a priest on 29 July 1934 and then taught at the seminary in Lugano and worked at the Catholic University of Milan.

In preparation for a career in the diplomatic service, he entered the Pontifical Ecclesiastical Academy in 1937. He entered the diplomatic service of the Holy See in 1938. He early assignments included stints in Prague, Paris, and Ottawa.

On 31 July 1953, Pope Pius XII named him titular archbishop of Aegina and Apostolic Internuncio to Iran, the first Vatican representative there with a title higher than delegate. He received his episcopal consecration from Cardinal Eugène Tisserant on 13 September. He was appointed Apostolic Nuncio to Venezuela on 24 September 1955 and to Uruguay on 27 February 1960. On 23 October 1965 he joined the staff of the Secretariat of State in Rome. Pope Paul VI gave him his last assignment as Pro-Nuncio to Syria on 17 June 1967.

Forni participated in the second, third, and fourth sessions of Second Vatican Council.

His diplomatic career ended with the appointment of Achille Glorieux to succeed him in Syria on 19 September 1969.

In retirement he lived in Lugano. He died on 29 September 1990.
