= John Hine =

British Roman Catholic bishop (1938–2024)

The Right Reverend John Hine
- Auxiliary Bishop of Southwark
- Archdiocese: Southwark
- Appointed: 26 January 2001
- Term ended: 7 May 2016
- Other post: Titular Bishop of Beverley (2001–2024)

Orders
- Ordination: 28 October 1962 by William Godfrey
- Consecration: 27 February 2001 by Michael George Bowen

Personal details
- Born: 26 July 1938 Royal Tunbridge Wells, Kent, England
- Died: 16 November 2024 (aged 86) Staplehurst, Kent, England

The Right Reverend John Franklin Meldon Hine (26 July 1938 – 16 November 2024) was a British Roman Catholic bishop. He was an auxiliary bishop of the Archdiocese of Southwark from February 2001 until his retirement in May 2016, and held the titular see of Beverley.

== Early life ==
John Franklin Meldon Hine was born in Royal Tunbridge Wells, part of the Southwark Archdiocese, on 26 July 1938. He was the son of Lieutenant Commander Jack F. W. Hine (RN) and Moira E. Hine. He was educated by the Jesuits at Stonyhurst College and the Xaverian Brothers at Mayfield College.

After studying at the Venerable English College, Rome, Hine was ordained as a Catholic priest on 28 October 1962 for the Archdiocese of Southwark. He served as Vicar General and Chancellor of the Archdiocese before his elevation to the episcopate, and was a Canon of the Cathedral of St George, Southwark and a Monsignor.

== Episcopal ministry ==
On 26 January 2001, Pope John Paul II, on the recommendation of the Apostolic Nuncio and the then Archbishop of Southwark, Michael Bowen, appointed Father Hine as an auxiliary bishop of Southwark. He received episcopal ordination from Archbishop Bowen on 27 February 2001, with Bishops Christopher Budd and Crispian Hollis as co consecrators, and assigned the titular see of Beverley. Archbishop Bowen gave him oversight of the Kent Pastoral Area of the Archdiocese, which comprises the deaneries of Canterbury, Chatham, Dover, Gravesend, Maidstone, Thanet and Bishop Hine's home area of Tunbridge Wells.

Within the Episcopal Conference of England and Wales Hine chaired the Committee on Marriage and the Family and often spoke in public on such matters, doing so in 2007 on cohabitation and whether – or not – it was equivalent to marriage.

In time Hine became the most senior of the three auxiliaries in Southwark, having been appointed five years before Bishops Hendricks and Lynch. As such, he deputised for the Archbishop at a number of diocesan events, such as the 2008 Chrism Mass, during Archbishop Kevin McDonald's convalescence from a heart bypass operation, as well as continuing to oversee his own geographical patch in Kent. He was elected as Diocesan Administrator following Archbishop McDonald's resignation, serving from December 2009 to June 2010, when Archbishop Peter Smith was installed as archbishop.

In accordance with Canon Law, upon reaching the age of 75, Hine submitted his resignation from office to Pope Francis. In January 2014 he relinquished his geographical responsibilities for the Kent area of the Archdiocese of Southwark, and was appointed parish priest of St Andrew's, Tenterden. He retired as auxiliary bishop on 7 May 2016.

== Death ==
Hine died on 16 November 2024, at the age of 86 at Abbotsleigh Care Centre in Staplehurst.

== Sources ==
- Biodata from Southwark Diocese website

Catholic Church titles
Preceded by —	Auxiliary Bishop of Southwark; 2001–2016	Succeeded by —
Preceded by Achille Glorieux	Titular Bishop of Beverley; 2001–2024	Succeeded by Gerard Bradley
