= Amelio Poggi =

Italian prelate

- Apostolic Pro-Nuncio to Syria
- Church: Catholic Church
- See: Apostolic Nunciature to Syria
- In office: 26 September 1973 – 23 December 1974
- Predecessor: Achille Glorieux
- Successor: Angelo Pedroni
- Other post: Titular Archbishop of Cercina (1967-1974)
- Previous posts: Apostolic Delegate to Central-Western Africa (1969-1973); Apostolic Pro-Nuncio to Uganda (1967-1969); Apostolic Nuncio to Rwanda & Burundi (1967-1969)

Orders
- Ordination: 8 August 1937
- Consecration: 16 July 1967 by Pope Paul VI

Personal details
- Born: 9 October 1914 Bibbiena, Province of Arezzo, Kingdom of Italy
- Died: 23 December 1974 (aged 60)

Amelio Poggi (9 October 1914 – 23 December 1974) was an Italian prelate of the Catholic Church who spent his career in the diplomatic service of the Holy See, including stints as Apostolic Nuncio in Rwanda, Uganda, and Syria.

== Biography ==
Amelio Poggi was born in Bibbiena in the Province of Arezzo on 9 October 1914. He was ordained a priest on 8 August 1937.

To prepare for a diplomatic career he entered the Pontifical Ecclesiastical Academy in 1947.

On 27 May 1967, Pope Paul VI named him a titular archbishop and Apostolic Nuncio to Burundi and to Rwanda. He received his episcopal consecration from Pope Paul on 16 July 1967. On 5 August 1967, he was appointed the Pro-Nuncio to Uganda as well.

On 27 November 1969, Pope Paul appointed him Apostolic Delegate to Central-Western Africa. (Note: The Delegation to Central-Western Africa was responsible for Nigeria, Cameroon, Gabon, Oubangui-Chari, and Chad.)

On 26 September 1973, Pope Paul named him Apostolic Pro-Nuncio to Syria.

He died on 23 December 1974.
