= San Paolino =

San Paolino (Italian language) usually refers to St. Paulinus of Nola

San Paolino may also refer to:

- Church of San Paolino, Florence
- Church of San Paolino, Lucca
- Mountain of San Paolino, Sutera, Sicily
- Barons di San Paolino, a Maltese noble house

== See also ==
- Paolino
