= Gerard Bradley =

British Roman Catholic bishop (1938–2024)

The Right Reverend Gerard Francis Bradley
- Auxiliary Bishop of Southwark
- Archdiocese: Southwark
- Appointed: 22 December 2025
- Other post: Titular Bishop of Beverley

Orders
- Ordination: 9 June 1991 by Michael George Bowen
- Consecration: 2 February 2026 by John Wilson

Personal details
- Born: 22 October 1960 (age 65) Croydon, Surrey, England

Gerard Francis Bradley (born 22 October 1960) is a British Roman Catholic bishop. He serves as an auxiliary bishop of the Archdiocese of Southwark and titular bishop of Beverley since 2025.

Bradley was born in Croydon, Surrey, England on 22 October 1960. He was ordained a priest in the Archdiocese of Southwark on 9 June 1991. Bradley was appointed an auxiliary bishop of the Archdiocese of Southwark and titular bishop of Beverley by Pope Leo XIV on 22 December 2025, and consecrated by Archbishop of Southwark John Wilson on 2 February 2026.

Catholic Church titles
Preceded by John Hine	Titular Bishop of Beverley; 2025–present	Incumbent
