= Vittore Ugo Righi =

Vittore Ugo Righi (23 March 1910 – 28 April 1980) was an Italian prelate of the Catholic Church who served in the diplomatic service of the Holy See. He became an archbishop in 1963 and led the offices representing the Holy See in Paraguay and Iran.

== Biography ==
Vittore Ugo Righi was born on 23 March 1910 in Gualdo Tadino, Italy. His parents named him after the French author Victor Hugo. (Note: Authors who miss the reference to Hugo sometimes render his first name as Vittorio, including the Italian translation of Hebblethwaite.) He was ordained a priest on 24 June 1933.

One of his early assignments in the diplomatic service took him to the Apostolic Delegation to Turkey where in 1939 he became secretary to Angelo Roncalli, the future Pope John XXIII. Roncalli found him "docile and good".

On 14 October 1961, Pope John XXIII appointed him titular archbishop of Bilta and Apostolic Internuncio to Iran. He received his episcopal consecration on 8 December 1961 from Cardinal Luigi Traglia.

On 1 February 1964, Pope Paul VI appointed him Apostolic Nuncio to Paraguay. His assignment there ended in 1967.

He authored a study of Roncalli's work in Greece and Turkey during World War II that appeared in 1971.

He died on 28 April 1980. A street in his home town is named for him.
