= Civitella del Lago =

Village in Umbria, Italy

Coordinates: 42°42′38″N 12°16′56″E

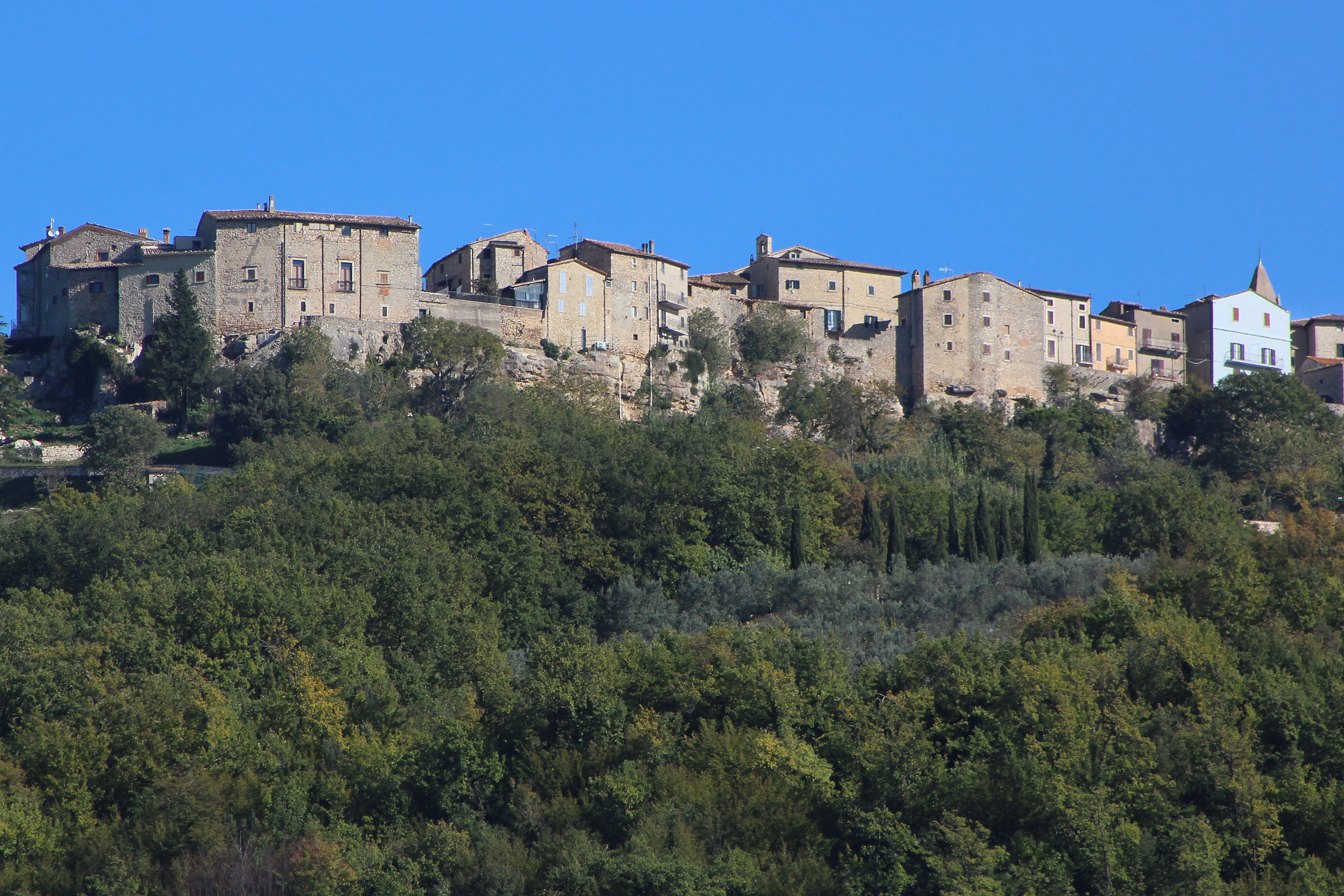
View of Civitella del Lago

Civitella del Lago (originally known as Civitella de' Pazzi) is a village in the Italian region of Umbria, administratively a frazione of the commune of Baschi.

According to the 2021 census, Civitella del Lago has a population of 365 inhabitants and stands at an elevation of 476 metres (1,562 ft) above sea level. (Note: To obtain the data from the website: 1. Select "Basi Territoriali 2021: Confini amministrativi, Località, Sezioni di censimento, Aree SubCom".; 2. Use the search function to find the desired place.; 3. Click the Attribute Table icon in the top-right corner.; 4. In the panel that appears at the bottom of the page, select "Località 2021".)

== History ==
Civitella is traditionally considered to have Roman origins, a claim already noted by Pliny the Younger. In the Middle Ages it developed as a fortified outpost of Todi. Several noble families held lordship over the settlement, including the Fredi from the 12th century and the Atti in the 16th century. Local stonemasons were once well known for their craftsmanship.

In 1810 the village adopted the name Civitella de' Pazzi, though the reason for this change is unclear. Following the construction of the Corbara Dam and the creation of Lake Corbara, it took the name Civitella del Lago in 1962.

== Geography ==
Civitella del Lago is located about 5 miles from Baschi, 2 miles from Morre, and 10 miles from Todi. The settlement stands on a rocky outcrop. Its territory, historically measured at 26,778 tavole, produced modest agricultural yields. In one part of the area there is a rounded depression known as the Vorgozzo.

Civitella is located above Lake Corbara, an artificial lake on the Tiber. The village overlooks the Tiber Valley and the province of Viterbo, and on clear days it is possible to see as far as the hills above the Tyrrhenian Sea.

== Demographics ==
In the mid-19th century, Civitella had a population of 923 inhabitants: 452 living in the village and 471 in the surrounding countryside. These were organized into 168 families occupying 168 houses. The inhabitants were small landowners to varying degrees and were primarily engaged in agricultural work.

Many foreign residents, particularly from Britain, the United States, and the Netherlands, have settled in the area. The village is easily accessible by motorway from Rome and Florence, roughly midway between the two cities. It is about a 20-minute drive from Orvieto and Todi.

== Architecture and Landmarks ==
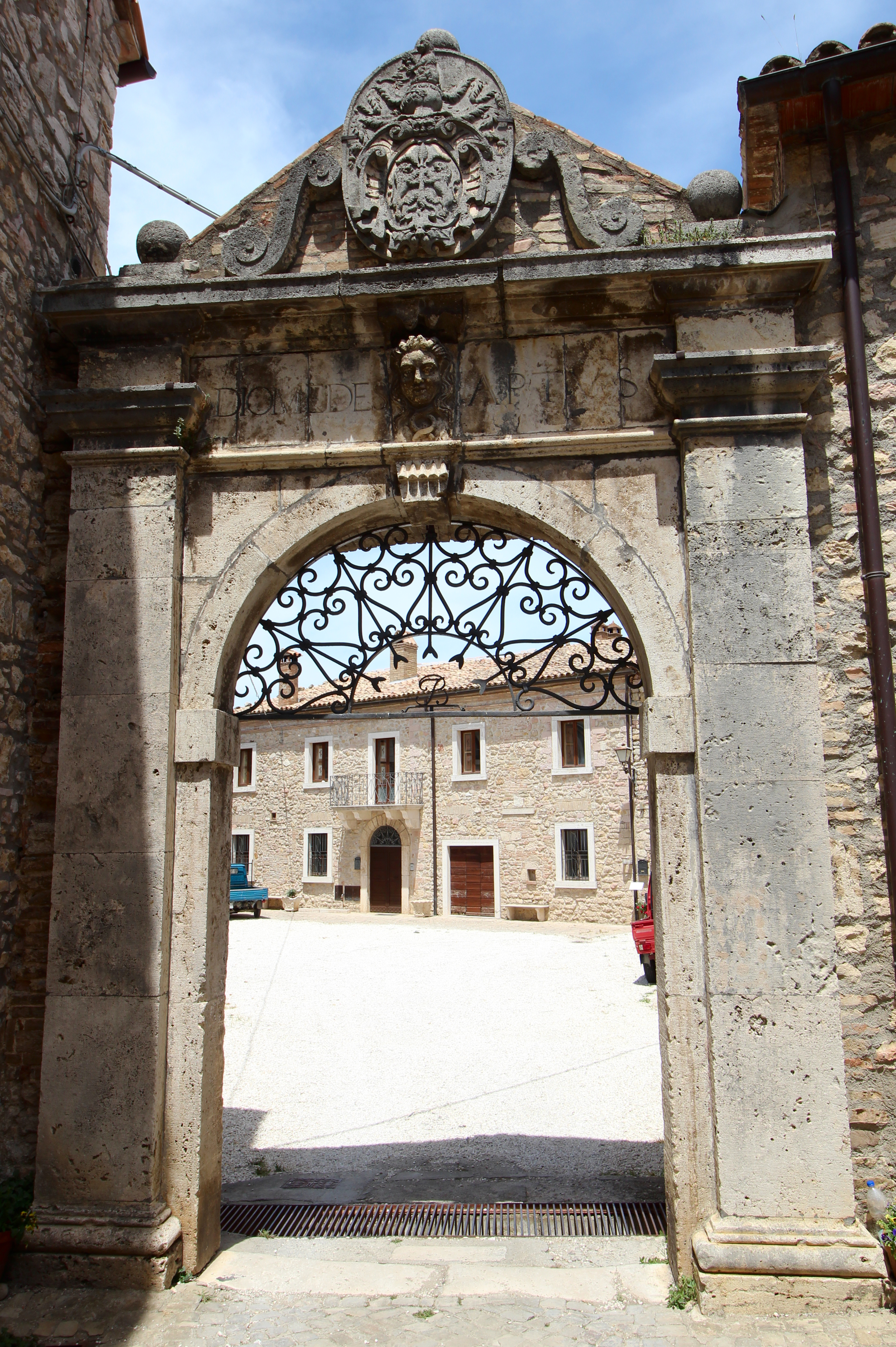
The Arch of Diomede

Notable buildings include the Palazzo degli Atti, the Portella gate and the Arch of Diomede degli Atti.

The village is also home to the Museo dell'Ovo Pinto, a museum dedicated to decorated eggs, and to a devotional Way of the Cross featuring works by modern Umbrian painters inside the Church of the Madonna del Prato. Nearby is the Parco di Bottilandia, a wooded area where small shelters made from old wooden barrels have been installed.

== Religion ==
The parish church of Santa Maria is the oldest church in the former castle. The Church of the Madonna del Prato was built in 1660.

In addition to the parish church, there is a rural church dedicated to the Most Holy Conception, located about one hundred paces from the village. The principal feast day was celebrated on 13 June in honor of Saint Anthony of Padua.
