= Paolino Limongi =

Italian prelate (1914–1967)

Paolino Limongi (2 December 1914 – 25 May 1967) was an Italian prelate of the Catholic Church who served in the diplomatic service of the Holy See. He became an archbishop in 1963 and led the offices representing the Holy See in Costa Rica and Iran.

== Biography ==
Paolino Limongi was born on 2 December 1914 in Bellona, Italy. He was ordained a priest on 18 July 1937.

To prepare for a diplomatic career he entered the Pontifical Ecclesiastical Academy in 1942.

On 15 August 1963, Pope Paul VI appointed him titular archbishop of Nicaea Parva and Apostolic Nuncio to Costa Rica.

He received his episcopal consecration on 20 October 1963 from Pope Paul.

On 9 July 1969, Pope Paul appointed him Apostolic Pro-Nuncio to Iran. He was replaced in this post on 13 March 1971 by Ernesto Gallina.

He died on 5 December 1996.
