= Corbara Dam =

Dam on the River Tiber in Terni, Umbria

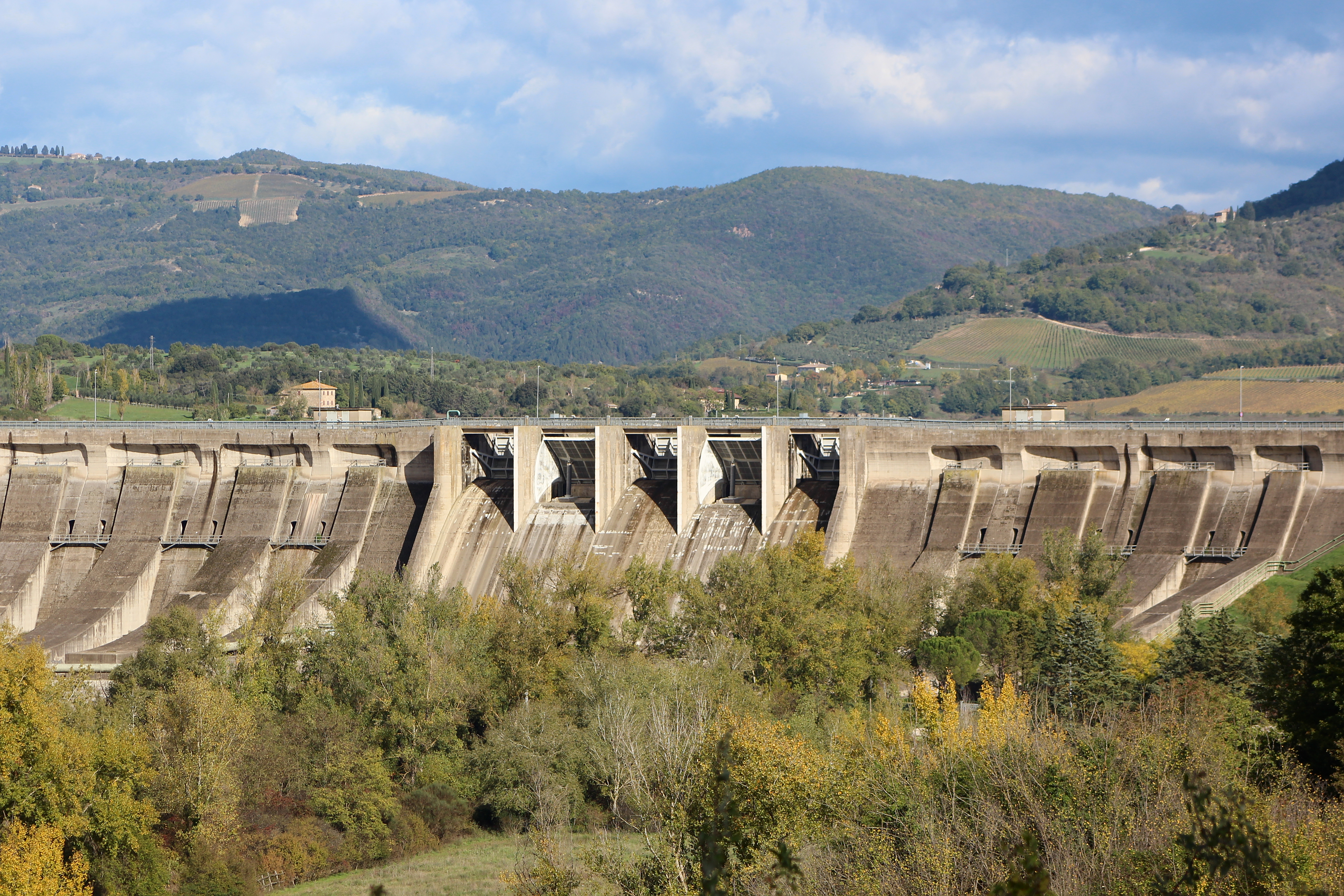
- The dam and its spillway

- Location within Italy
- Official name: Diga di Corbara
- Country: Italy
- Location: Corbara, Terni, Umbria
- Coordinates: 42°42′11.30″N 12°13′50.93″E
- Purpose: Power, flood control
- Status: Operational
- Construction began: 1959
- Opening date: 1963; 63 years ago
- Owner: Enel

Dam and spillways
- Type of dam: Gravity with embankment section
- Impounds: River Tiber
- Height: 52 m (171 ft)
- Length: 640 m (2,100 ft)

Reservoir
- Creates: Lake Corbara
- Total capacity: 190,000,000 m^{3} (150,000 acre⋅ft)
- Active capacity: 135,000,000 m^{3} (109,000 acre⋅ft)
- Catchment area: 6,042 km^{2} (2,333 mi^{2})

Terni Hydroelectric Complex
- Turbines: 38
- Installed capacity: 531 MW

The Corbara Dam is located on the River Tiber near Corbara (Terni) in the province of Terni in the Umbria region of Italy.

== Background ==
It is a combination gravity and embankment dam. The gravity section forms the spillway while the embankment section adjoins on the left side. The dam was constructed between 1959 and 1963 for the primary purpose of hydroelectric power generation but it was later found to useful in preventing floods in the Tiber basin. The reservoir created by the dam, Lake Corbara, supplies water to the expansive Terni Hydroelectric Complex. The complex has an installed capacity of 531 MW and is owned by Enel.

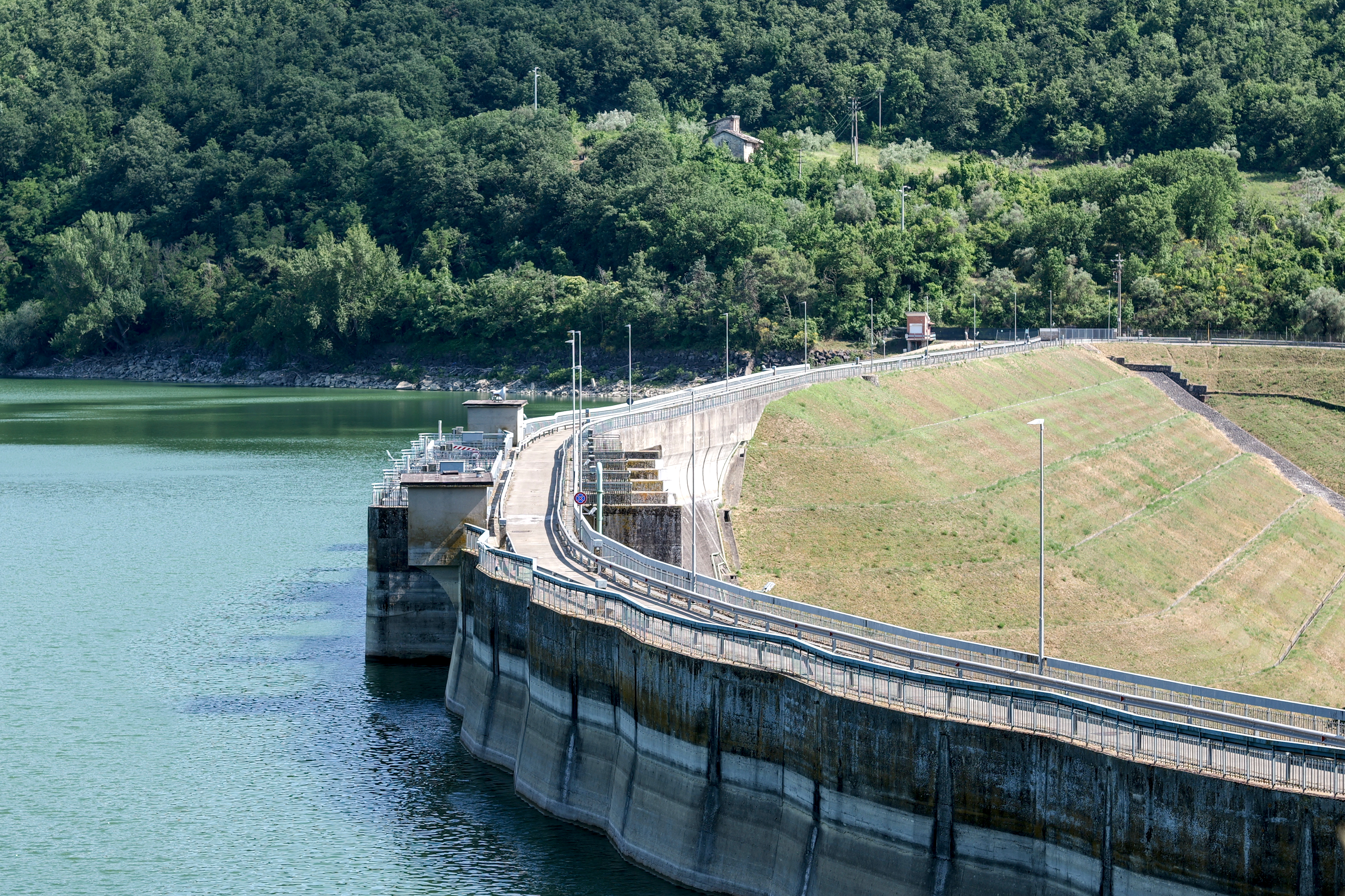
view from north

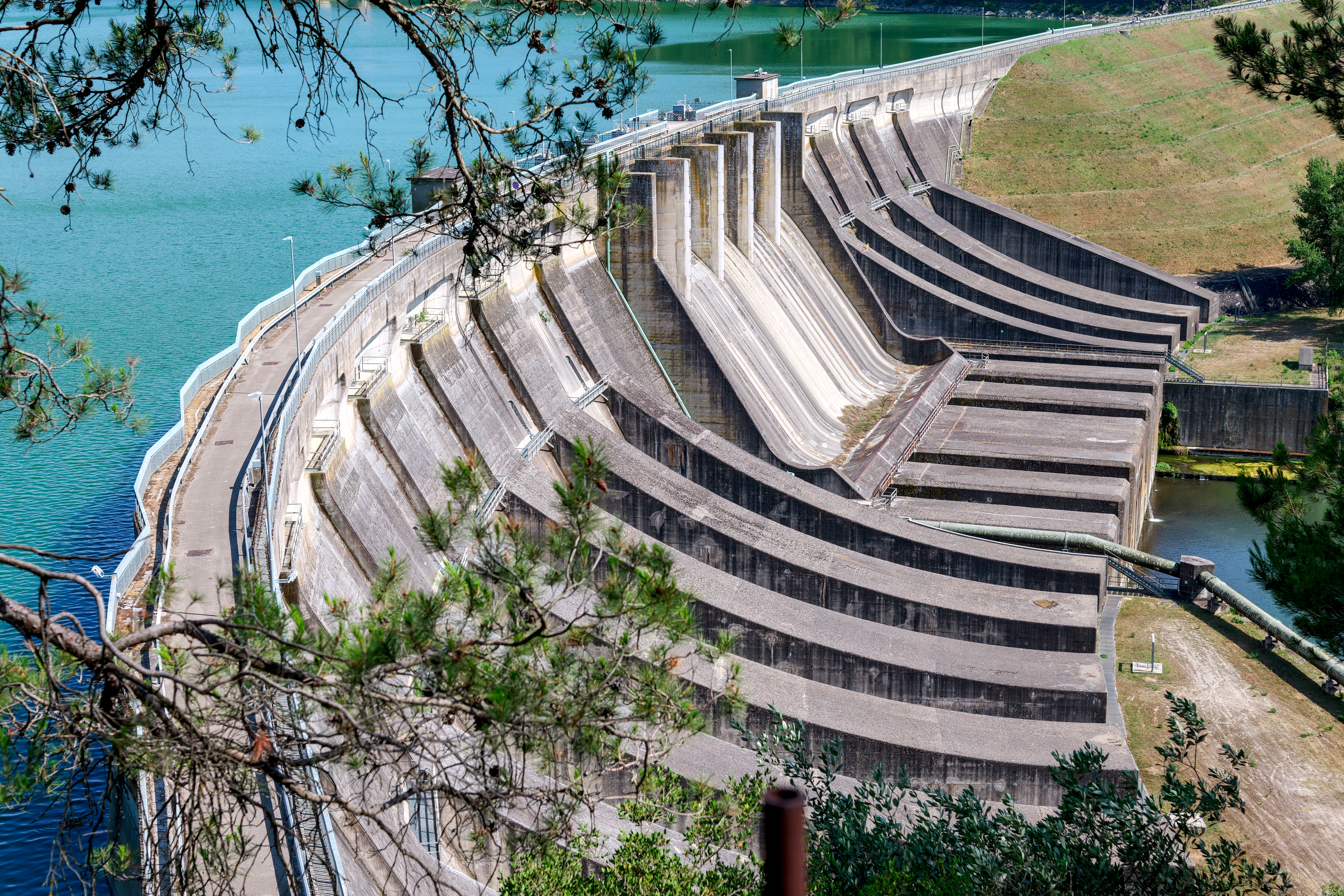
view from north

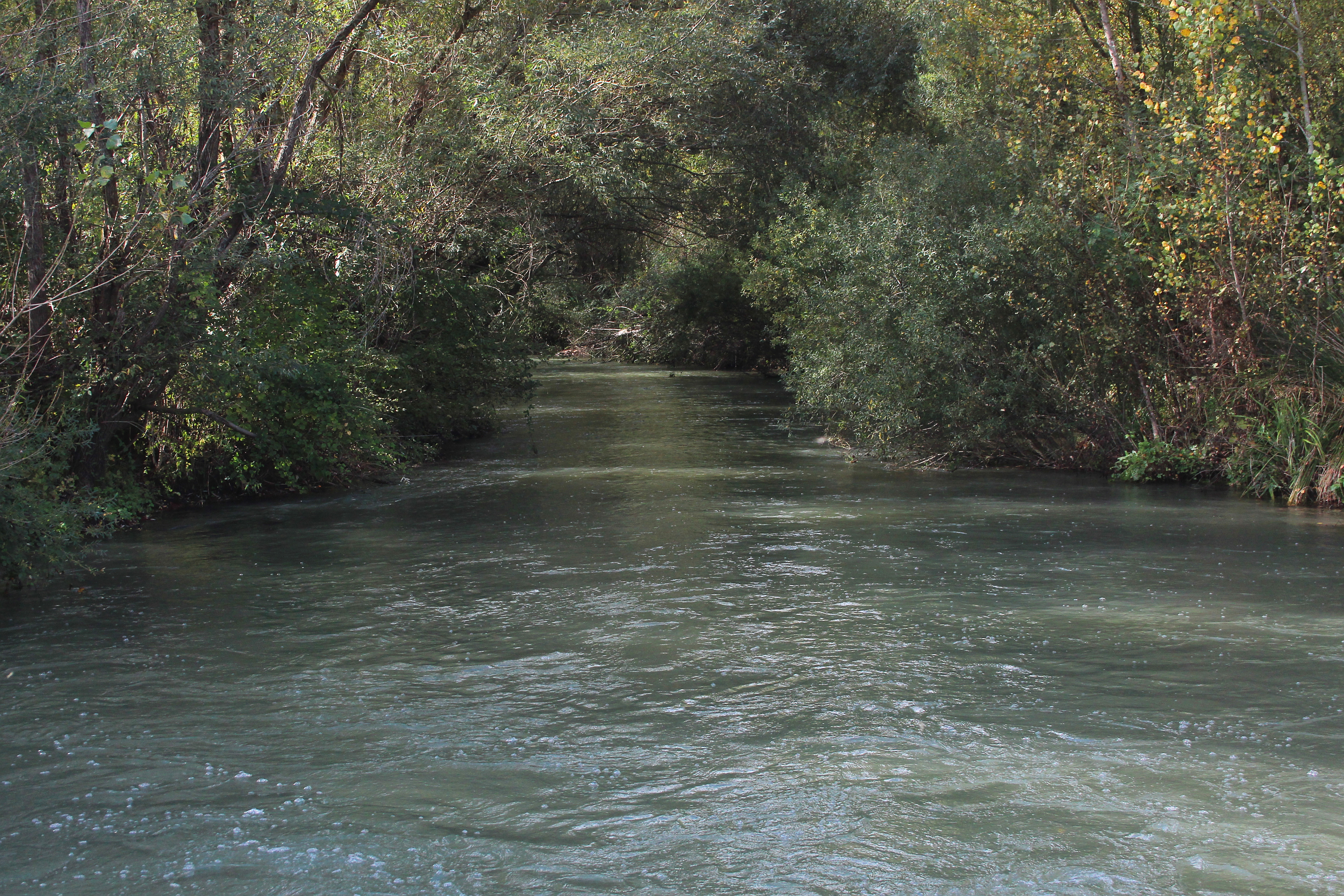
the river Tiber behind the dam
