= Frediano Giannini =

Italian catholic archbishop

Frediano Giannini OFM (16 June 1861 – 25 October 1939) was an Italian prelate of the Catholic Church who served as an archbishop and Apostolic Delegate to Syria from 1936 to 1947.

== Biography ==
Frediano Giannini was born on 16 June 1861 in Bozzano, a town in Massarosa, Italy. He joined the Franciscans on 8 August 1876, took his final vows on 22 November 1881, and was ordained a priest of the Order of Friars Minor on 21 December 1883.

From March 1900 to February 1905, he headed the Franciscan guardianship of shrines in the Holy Land, the priory known as the Custody of the Holy Land. On 20 January 1905, Pope Pius XI appointed him titular archbishop of Serrae, Apostolic Vicar of Aleppo, and Apostolic Delegate to Syria. He received his episcopal consecration on 5 March 1905 from Archbishop Aurelio Briante, Apostolic Delegate to Egypt.

With the changing political jurisdictions occurring during the First World War, Giannini, along with his colleague Angelo Dolci, Apostolic Delegate to Constantinople, disputed Ottoman attempts to confiscate Church properties as if they were French-owned and contended that the Holy See was the owner of the properties in the care of the Custody of the Holy Land.

On 12 February 1936, Pope Pius XI named him Vice Camerlengo of the Holy Roman Church. On 30 May he was appointed a consultor to the Congregation for the Oriental Churches. He assisted the Camerlengo Eugenio Pacelli, the future Pope Pius XII, upon the death of Pius XI in February 1939.

He died on 25 October 1939 at the age of 78.
