= Adriaan Smets =

Dutch Catholic priest (1867–1947)

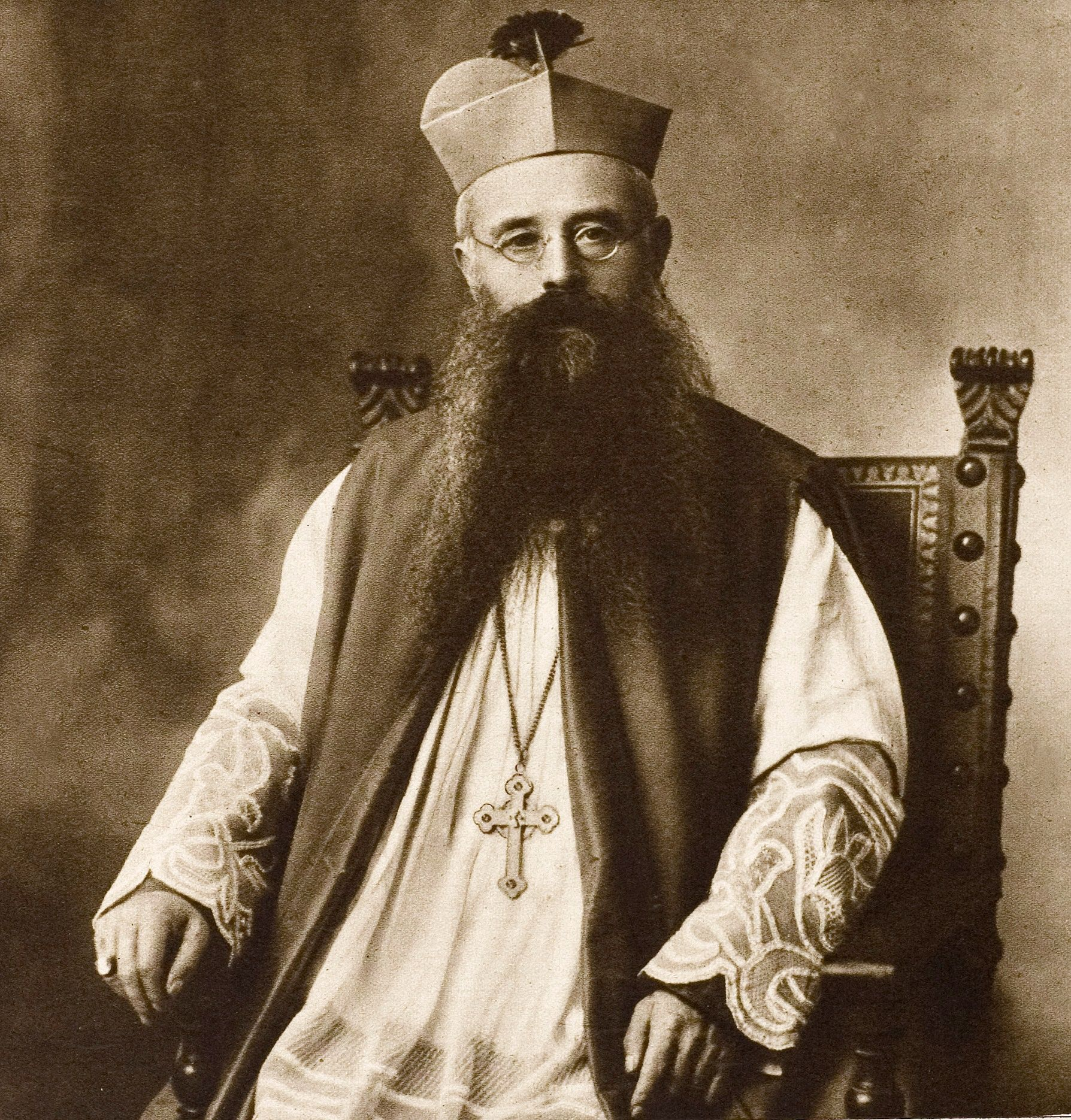
Mgr. Adrianus Smets

Adriaan Smets (27 August 1867 – 31 July 1947) was a Dutch prelate of the Catholic Church who worked in the diplomatic service of the Holy See.

== Biography ==
Adriaan Smets was born in Dommelen, in Valkenswaard, a town in North Brabant, the Netherlands, on 27 August 1867. He was ordained a priest on 24 September 1892.

His pastoral assignments led to work in the jurisdiction of the Patriarch of Jerusalem, where he became a member of the Canons of the Church of the Holy Sepulchre. In the aftermath of the fall of the Ottoman Empire at the end of World War I and the consequent reorganization of ecclesiastical jurisdictions, Smets served as Apostolic Visitor to Baghdad in 1919–1921.

On 13 January 1922, Pope Benedict XV named him Apostolic Delegate to Persia (now Iran).

On 2 August Pope Pius XI appointed him a titular archbishop. He received his episcopal consecration on 28 October from Cardinal Willem van Rossum.

While holding that diplomatic post, he also served as Apostolic Administrator of the Caucasus, though Bolshevik control forced him to reside in Tehran, where he witnessed the establishment of the Pahlavi dynasty in 1925.

In 1930 he returned to Rome, where he lived until his death on 31 July 1947, almost 80 years of age.
