= Paolo Pappalardo =

Paolo Pappalardo (18 February 1903 – 6 August 1966) was an Italian prelate of the Catholic Church who worked in the diplomatic service of the Holy See.

Paolo Pappalardo was born in Buccheri, Sicily, Italy, on 18 February 1903. He was ordained a priest on 15 August 1925 and then taught in the local seminary. In 1933 he took up a position in the liturgy section of the Congregation for the Oriental Churches.

He entered the diplomatic service of the Holy See. His assignments included a stint as chargé d’affaires in delegation in Istanbul under Apostolic Delegate Angelo Roncalli (later Pope John XXIII).

On 7 August 1948, Pope Pius XII named him a titular archbishop and Apostolic Delegate to Iran. He received his episcopal consecration on 29 August 1948. He was given additional responsibilities as Apostolic Administrator of Isfahan in 1949. On 19 March 1953, Pope Pius reassigned him to be Apostolic Internuncio to Syria. On 4 July of that year he gave additional responsibilities as Apostolic Administrator of Aleppo.

Because of health problems, in 1958 he moved to Rome, where he could be treated at the Frascati Hospital. Pope John visited him there on 19 May 1959. He died on 6 August 1966 at the age of 63.
