= Ernesto Gallina =

Italian prelate

Ernesto Gallina (15 May 1924 – 16 May 2002) was an Italian prelate of the Catholic Church who worked in the diplomatic service of the Holy See.

== Biography ==
Ernesto Gallina was born in Frosinone, Italy, on 15 May 1924. He was ordained a priest on 31 May 1947.

To prepare for a career in the diplomatic service, he entered the program of study at the Pontifical Ecclesiastical Academy in 1951.

On 16 July 1969, Pope Paul VI named him a titular archbishop and gave him three diplomatic posts: Apostolic Nuncio to Cameroon, Apostolic Pro-Nuncio to Gabon, and Apostolic Delegate to Central Africa.

He received his episcopal consecration on 10 August from Cardinal Jean-Marie Villot.

On 15 March 1971, Pope Paul appointed him Apostolic Pro-Nuncio to Iran.

From 4 January 1976 until he retired on 15 May 1999, he worked at the Secretariat of State in Rome.

He died on 16 May 2002, at the age of 78.
