= St Pancras Church, Ipswich =

St Pancras, Ipswich
- Saint Pancras
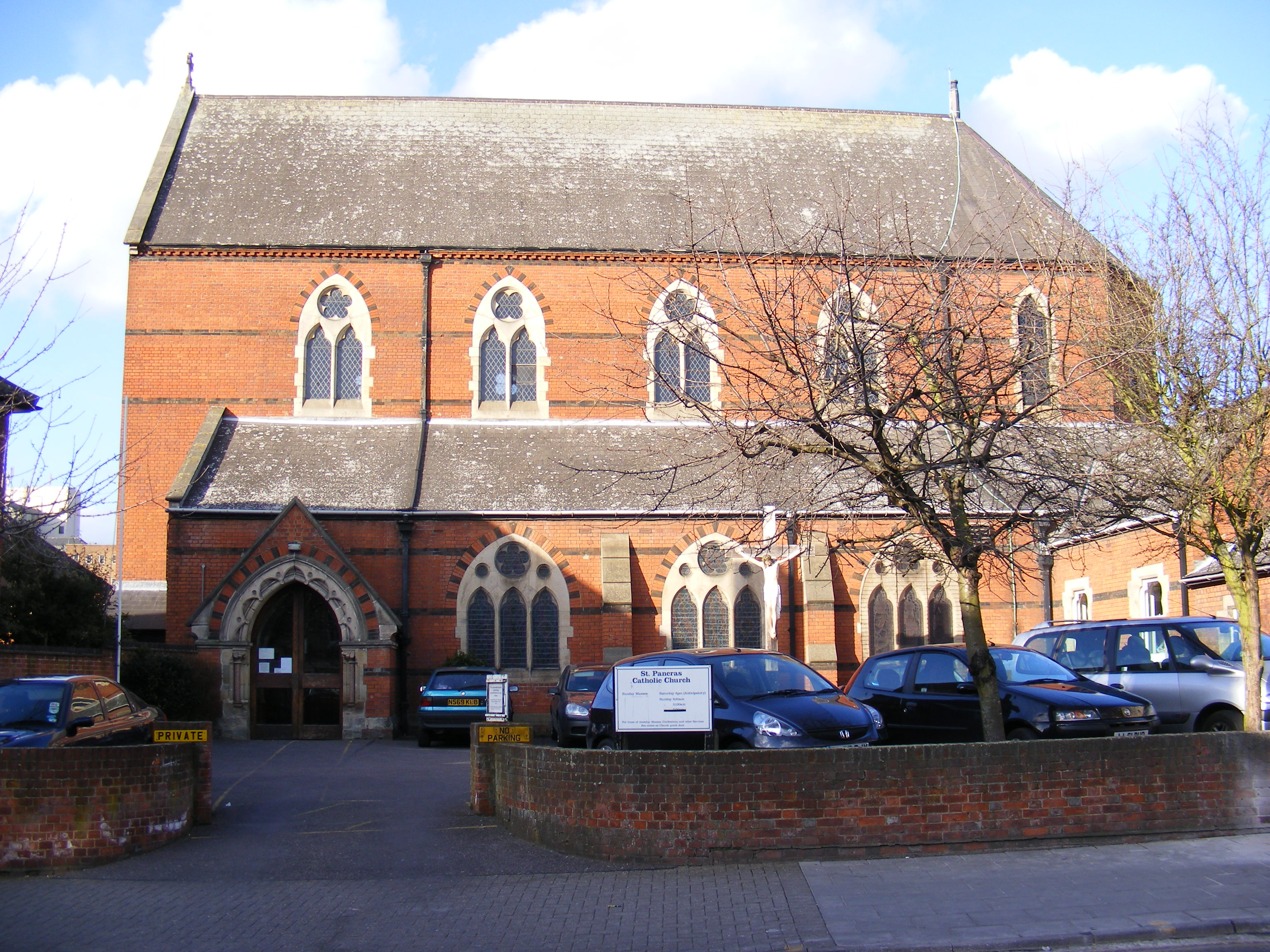
- Saint Pancras Church

- Location in Ipswich
- 52°03′20.7″N 1°09′31.8″E
- Location: Ipswich, Suffolk
- Country: England
- Denomination: Roman Catholic
- Website: stpancraschurch.org.uk

History
- Status: Active
- Founded: 1861
- Dedication: Saint Pancras of Rome

Architecture
- Heritage designation: Grade II
- Designated: 6 April 1988
- Architect: George Goldie
- Architectural type: Victorian Gothic

Administration
- Diocese: Roman Catholic Diocese of East Anglia
- Deanery: Ipswich Deanery

Clergy
- Bishop: Alan Hopes
- Priest: Joseph Welch

Saint Pancras is an active Roman Catholic parish church serving the town centre of Ipswich, England. The neo-Gothic church was built as part of the British Catholic revival in the nineteenth century, and was the target of anti-Catholic riots soon after completion.

== Building and dedication of the church ==
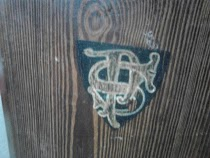
An interlaced "S" and "P" from an original front pew from the 1860s

The construction of St Pancras was largely financed from the estate of L'Abbé Louis Simon. Abbé Simon was a French émigré priest who came to Ipswich in 1793, during the French Revolution, and became the first Catholic priest to celebrate Mass regularly in Ipswich since the Reformation. Simon was from an aristocratic family in Normandy and sold property he inherited in Normandy to fund church building in his adopted home of Ipswich.

The church was built by George Goldie, a prominent Catholic architect. According to the church's website, Goldie may have intended St Pancras to develop into a larger structure, a cathedral for a future Catholic diocese of East Anglia. The church and the area surrounding St Pancras were originally part of the Catholic parish of St Mary's, Woodbridge Road in the Diocese of Northampton. St Pancras was consecrated by the Bishop of Northampton, Francis Amherst, with the future Cardinal Manning preaching the sermon.

== History ==
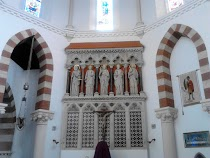
Main altar with reredos and statues of Christ and the Four Evangelists

Two years after the church was consecrated, in 1863, St Pancras was the target of a series of anti-Catholic riots. This led to the curate barricading himself in the presbytery for two days after disturbances during Guy Fawkes Night. The riot was suppressed only when the Mayor of Ipswich enrolled 200 special constables, although the riots were credited with creating sympathy for the church and the Catholic community among local dignitaries. In 1871 the church became a separate parish, for the first ten years under the care of the Pallottines, an Italian order. In 1885 St Pancras merged with St Mary's to become a single parish, this time based in the more central St Pancras.

In 1919 St Mary's split from St Pancras to become its own parish. St Pancras was originally the Catholic parish that served Old Stoke and the Chantry Estate to the southwest of Ipswich, although this section of the parish became the parish of Saint Mark's. In the 1940s it became the centre of the Polish community in Ipswich although later the parish of St Mary became the pastoral centre of the Polish community.

In 1976 St Pancras, with all the other Catholic parishes in Suffolk, was transferred to the new Diocese of East Anglia. On Christmas Day 1985 the church was badly burned in an arson attack which meant that the choir loft and organ had to be rebuilt.

== Architecture and fittings ==
St Pancras is a grade II listed building built of red brick with a slate roof.

The main altar is at the east end of the church. Behind the altar are reredos and above the reredos are five large statues depicting Jesus Christ flanked by the four evangelists. To the north of the main altar is a small Lady chapel with an ornamental marble floral altar built against the east wall on which stands a statue of the Blessed Virgin Mary and the altar of repose. The tabernacle is directly behind the standalone altar, with a Victorian, ceiling-hung tabernacle lamp between the main altar and the Lady Chapel.

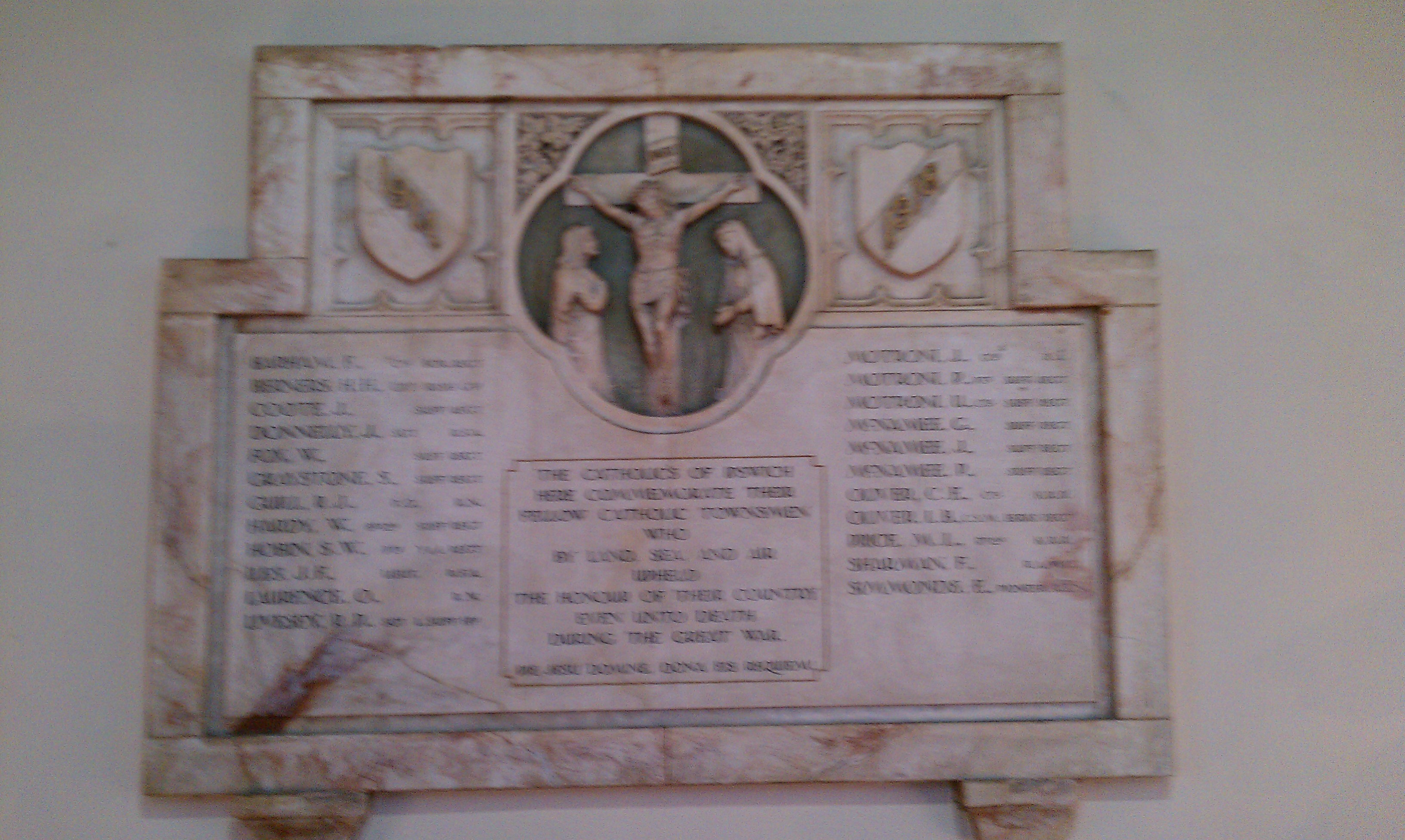
Memorial to the Catholics of Ipswich who died in the First World War

The choir loft is at the west end of the church. It was largely rebuilt in the 1980s after a fire in 1985. The church organ is in the choir loft. The organ was built in 1891 and has two manuals. At the back of the choir loft there is a large modern, stained glass rose window in plate tracery style that depicts the descent of the Holy Spirit, which was completed by the Ipswich artist Danielle Hopkinson for the Millennium.

Beneath the choir loft and behind wrought iron gates is a Caen stone baptismal font as well as two war memorials, a mounted marble wall plaque dedicated in 1922 to the Catholics of Ipswich who died during the First World War and a painted copy of the icon of Our Lady of Czestochowa donated by the crew of Polish armoured train C who were based in Ipswich during the Second World War.

The nave and sanctuary are in the Venetian style where the arches are alternately red and white brick. The interior was once multi-coloured but is now mostly white-washed. There is an elaborate wooden roof and the wooden pews are original.

To the west of the church is the presbytery with a small parish garden in which there is a copy of the statue of Our Lady of Ipswich. There is also a parish centre built in the 1970s. The original presbytery was built in the eighteenth century and demolished in a road-widening scheme by Ipswich Borough Council.
