= Bishop of East Anglia =

Bishop of East Anglia may refer to

- Bishop of East Anglia (modern), the modern Roman Catholic diocese
- Bishop of Norwich, the ancient diocese now at Norwich
- Bishop of Dunwich (ancient), the early Anglo-Saxon diocese of the East Angles
