= Roman Catholic Bishop of Elmham =

The Bishop of Elmham is an episcopal title which was first used by an Anglo-Saxon bishop between the 7th and 11th centuries and is currently used by the Catholic Church for a titular see. The title takes its name after the small town of North Elmham in Norfolk, England.

== Roman Catholic titular bishops ==
In 1969, the Catholic Church revived the title Bishop of Elmham, using Elmhama as the name of the titular see, but Helmamensis as the adjectival form in Contemporary Latin. The current titular bishop is the Most Reverend Eamonn Oliver Walsh, Auxiliary Bishop of Dublin who was appointed on 7 March 1990.

=== List of titular bishops ===
Titular Bishops of Elmham
From	Until	Incumbent	Notes
1969	1976	Alan Charles Clark	Appointed Titular Bishop of Elmham and Apostolic Administrator of Northampton on 31 March 1969; ordained bishop on 13 May 1969; appointed Bishop of East Anglia on 23 April 1976
1977	1990	Patrick Leo McCartie	Appointed Titular Bishop of Elmham and Auxiliary Bishop of Birmingham on 13 April 1977; ordained bishop on 20 May 1977; appointed Bishop of Northampton on 20 February 1990
1990	present	Eamonn Oliver Walsh	Appointed Titular Bishop of Elmham and Auxiliary Bishop of Dublin on 7 March 1990; ordained bishop on 22 April 1990
