= Mary Magdalen, Ipswich =

St Mary Magdalen, Ipswich
- Saint Mary Magdalen
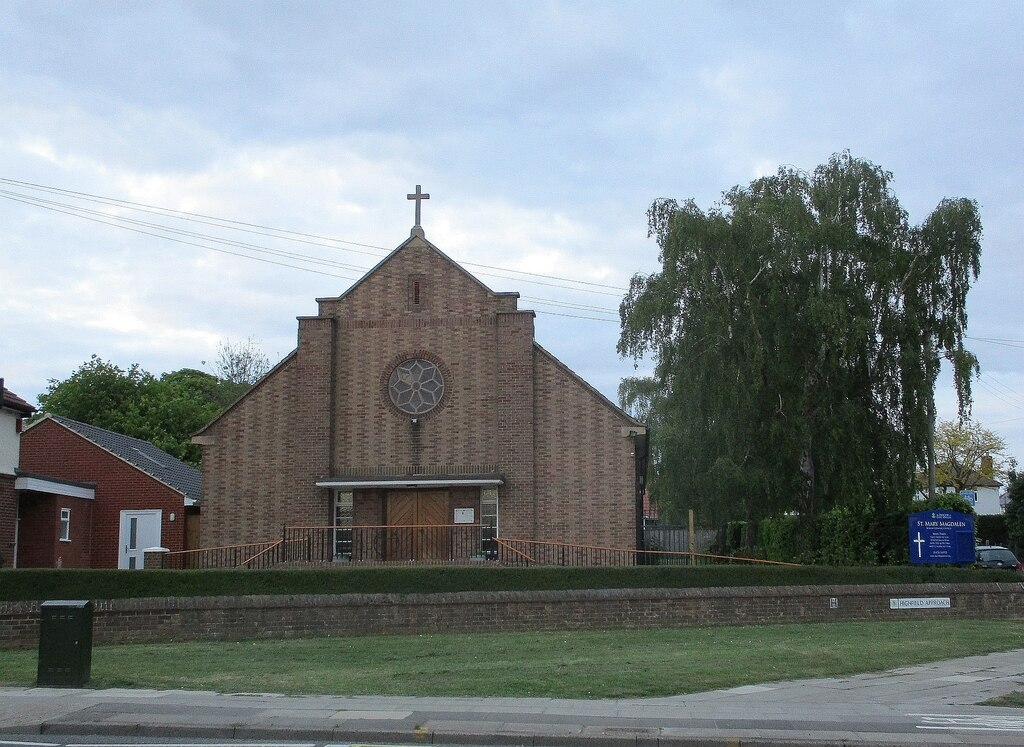

- Location in Suffolk
- 52.075346°N 1.129074°E
- Location: Ipswich, Suffolk
- Country: England
- Denomination: Roman Catholic
- Website: http://marymagdalens.org/

History
- Dedication: Mary Magdalen

Administration
- Diocese: Roman Catholic Diocese of East Anglia

The Church of St Mary Magdalen is a Roman Catholic church in Ipswich, in the county of Suffolk, England. It is dedicated to Jesus' companion Mary Magdalene. It was founded in 1956 and is part of the Roman Catholic Diocese of East Anglia. It was originally a part of the parish of Saint Pancras. It was built in 1959 and became a locally listed building in 2021.
