= St Laurence's Church, Cambridge =

St Laurence's
- St Laurence's Roman Catholic Church
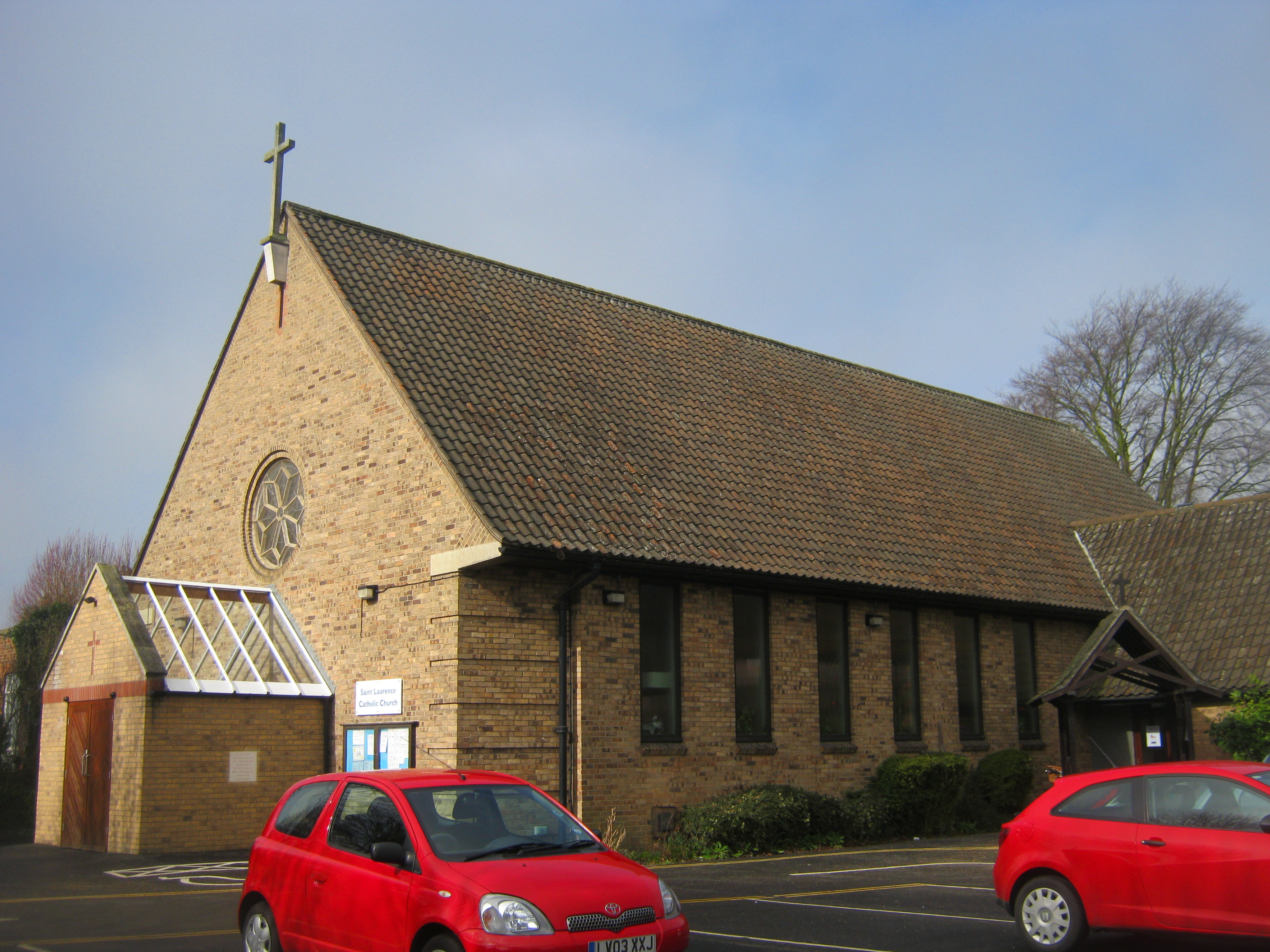
- St Laurence's
- 52.218145°N 0.129572°E
- Location: 91 Milton Road, Cambridge, CB4 1XB
- Country: England
- Denomination: Roman Catholic
- Website: www.saintlaurence.org.uk

Architecture
- Years built: 1958

Administration
- Diocese: East Anglia

Clergy
- Bishop: RT Rev Peter Collins
- Priest: Rev Robin Mampallithadathil CRM

The Church of St Laurence is a Roman Catholic church in Cambridge, England. Dedicated to St Laurence of Rome, it is part of the Diocese of East Anglia, within the Province of Westminster. The parish is part of St Andrew's Deanery and is one of three parishes serving the city of Cambridge, the other two being Our Lady and the English Martyrs and St Philip Howard.

== History of the parish and church ==
The first permanent post-Reformation Roman Catholic church in Cambridge was Our Lady and the English Martyrs opened and consecrated on 8 October 1890. The Roman Catholic population continued to grow and the opening of a Carmelite convent at 104-106 Chesterton Road in 1923 provided a new place of worship on the Northern side of the town.

In 1937 the Carmelite sisters moved to a quieter site at Waterbeach, into a building which, when vacated in the early 1970s, became the Waterbeach Lodge residential home for the elderly. Following the departure of the Carmelites from Cambridge, the need for a new parish gradually became apparent and within a year, there was a significant donation of £250 towards establishing a new mass centre or church for Roman Catholics in Chesterton.

In the years immediately after the Carmelite sisters left, Masses were said in private houses and informal venues until a small corrugated iron church was erected on the High Street in Chesterton. In 1947 this became the new Parish of St Laurence's, with the presbytery for the parish priest located at 1 Ferry Lane.

With the arrival of the Rev. Patrick Oates in 1951, efforts to fund raise and build a permanent church were accelerated. On 8 March 1958, Bishop Parker laid the foundation stone on the Milton Road site and on 24 August 1958, the new church was formally blessed and dedicated.

The old corrugated iron church building was originally part of the First Eastern General Hospital, Cambridge. After the First World War it was moved to the rectory garden of Our Lady and the English Martyrs and named Houghton Hall. In 1939 it became St Laurence's Church. Following the opening of the new church in 1958, the tin tabernacle was moved to its present site in Fen Ditton and became the Church of St Vincent de Paul.

== Architecture and appearance of the church ==
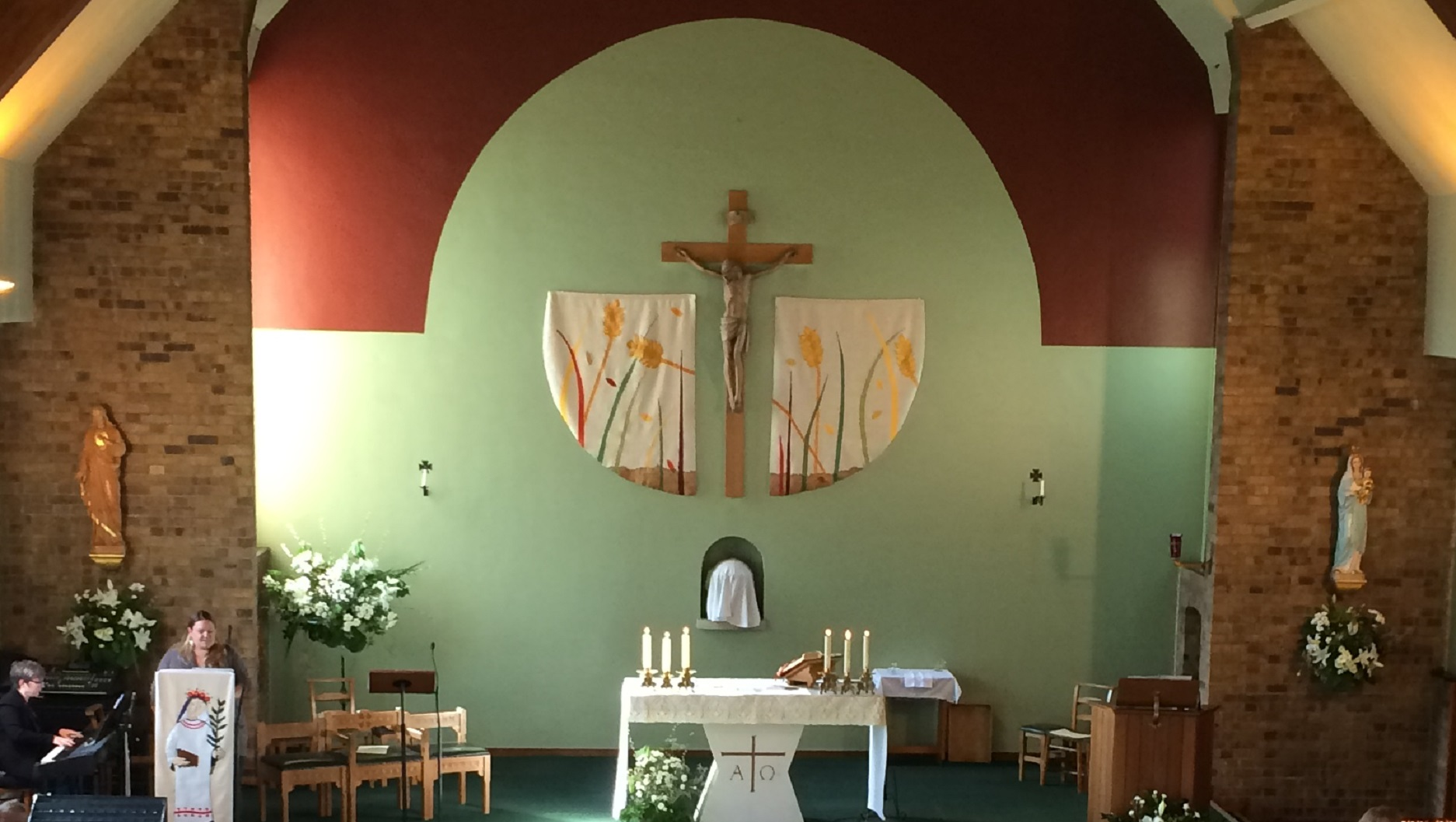
The interior of the church showing the altar and sanctuary area with statues and tapestry

St Laurence's is a modern church, built in brick and with an open layout so that all parts of the church can see the altar area.

The church has remained substantially unchanged since it was opened, with the exception of the removal of altar rails and the redesign of the altar following the Second Vatican Council. The porch was changed slightly around the time of the millennium, putting a glass roof on it to improve light. In the first decade of the twenty-first century a balcony was also constructed at the back of the church to increase capacity for the growing congregation.

== Parish priests and clergy ==
Parish Priest	Dates
Rev Gerard Hulme	1947–1951
Rev Patrick Oates	1951–1968
Rev Callum Weir	1968–1969
Rev Liam Brady	1969–1972
Rev John Drury	1972–1977
Rev Richard Wilson	1977–1982
Rev Peter Wynekus	1982–1988
Rev Michael Griffin	1988–1996
Rev David Paul	1997–2011
Canon Patrick Cleary	2011–2018
Canon Simon Blakesley	2018–2024
Rev Robin Mampallithadathil CRM	2025-

In addition to parish priests, the following additional priests have served the parish: Revs Peter Stoyle (1963–1964), Paul Hypher (1964–1967), Derrick Morgan (1967–1970), John Drury as curate (1970–1972), Timothy Russ (1972–1976), Francis Selman (1976–1979), Michael Vulliamy (1980–1982), Callum Weir (1981–1983), Joseph Farrell (1983–1986), Fr Bob Eccles (2011–2023), Rev Simon Davies (2024–2025) and assistant priest Rev Alex Vadasseril CRM (2025-)

The parish has had the following permanent deacons: Rev Geoffrey Cook (1978-)

== Parish statistics ==
The following table records the number of baptisms (of children), receptions (of adults) into the church, marriages and the number attending Sunday mass (as counted on the annual census Sunday).

Year	Baptisms	Receptions	Marriages	Estimated Roman Catholic population	Mass Attendance
1985	39	0	15	3600	735
1990	36	1	16	3000	505
1995	40	3	8	1640	614
2000	40	0	3	1640	580
2005	50	7	10	2400	689
2010	62	4	9	3250	706
2016	72	0	16	3500	698
