= St Thomas of Canterbury Church =

St Thomas of Canterbury Church may refer to:

- Cathedral Church of St Thomas of Canterbury, Portsmouth, United Kingdom
- St Thomas of Canterbury Church, Canterbury, Kent, UK
- St Thomas of Canterbury Church, Chester, Cheshire, UK
- Church of St Thomas of Canterbury, Clapham, Bedfordshire, UK
- Church of St Thomas of Canterbury, Cothelstone, Somerset, UK
- St Thomas of Canterbury Church, Fulham, London, UK
- St Thomas of Canterbury Church, Gainsborough, Lincolnshire, UK
- St Thomas of Canterbury Church, Woodford Green, London, UK
- Church of St Thomas of Canterbury, Kingswear, Devon, UK
- Church of St Thomas of Canterbury and the English Martyrs, Preston, Lancashire, UK
- Church of St Thomas of Canterbury and English Martyrs, St Leonards-on-Sea, East Sussex, UK
- Church of St Thomas of Canterbury, Woodbridge, Suffolk, UK

== See also ==
- St Thomas of Canterbury Church of England Aided Primary School
