= St Mark, Ipswich =

Catholic Church in Suffolk, England

St Mark Catholic Church
- Saint Mark Roman Catholic church
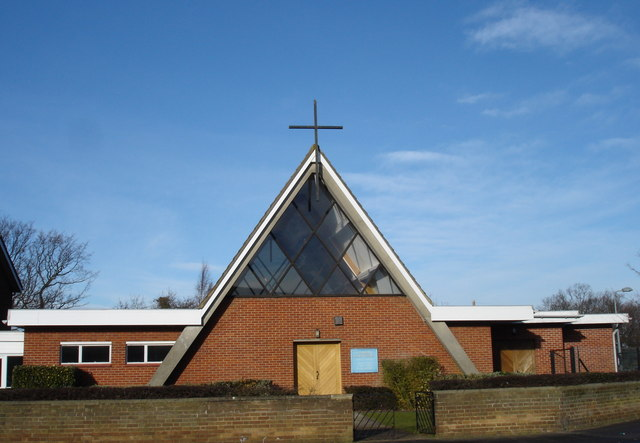
- Saint Mark's Church seen from the front

- Location in Suffolk
- 52°02′49″N 1°07′23″E
- Location: Ipswich, Suffolk
- Country: England
- Denomination: Roman Catholic
- Website: http://www.stmarksparish.org.uk/

History
- Founded: 1959
- Dedication: Saint Mark

Administration
- Diocese: Roman Catholic Diocese of East Anglia
- Deanery: Ipswich

Clergy
- Bishop: Alan Hopes

St. Mark's Roman Catholic Church is a Catholic church on the Chantry Estate in Ipswich. It is part of the Roman Catholic Diocese of East Anglia. It opened in May 1959.

Prior to the establishment of St. Mark's, the area was within the parish of St Pancras Church, Ipswich. Initially it was served by the Franciscans at East Bergholt, who also ministered at Brantham. Around 1973 most of the friars moved from East Bergholt to Canterbury, while a few set up small friary at Ipswich. The Franciscans withdrew in 1994.

There is also a Roman Catholic Primary School attached to the parish, also called St Mark's, which opened in 1967. In 2018, St. Mark's School won the Suffolk Junior Schools Mock Trial Competition.

The Catholic Church of the Holy Family in the village of Brantham is served from St Mark’s.
