= St Paul's Church, Tottenham =

Coordinates: 51.60249°N 0.06401°W

St Paul's, Tottenham
- Parish Church of St Paul the Apostle
- St Paul's, Tottenham
- Location: 60 Park Lane, Tottenham, London, N17 0JR
- Country: England
- Denomination: Church of England
- Tradition: Anglo-Catholic
- Website: www.stpaulstottenham.org.uk

History
- Dedicated: 1976 (new church)
- Consecrated: 1859 (original church)

Architecture
- Architect(s): Biscoe & Stanton

Administration
- Diocese: London
- Archdeaconry: Hampstead
- Deanery: East Haringey
- Parish: St. Paul, Tottenham

Clergy
- Vicar: Fr Staffan Dawkins

St Paul the Apostle is a church in the Church of England Diocese of London in Tottenham, London, England.

== History ==
The community of St Paul's began around 1855 in an iron building in Northumberland Park (what is now 125 Northumberland Park). Ms Jemima Holt bequeathed some land in Park Lane and William Mumford, architect, was appointed. Construction work began in 1858 and the church, built from Kentish stone, was consecrated in 1859 as one of the "Commissioners churches".

In 1973 the building was demolished and whilst the new church and flats were being built the church community worshipped in the school hall across the road. The current building was dedicated on 20 November 1976 by the Right Revd Bill Westwood, Bishop of Edmonton.

Fr Alan Hopes, who later converted to Roman Catholicism and became an Auxiliary Bishop of Westminster and then Bishop of East Anglia, was Vicar of St Paul's for 16 years.

St Paul's is in the Anglo-Catholic tradition of the Church of England, celebrating Mass daily.

== Clergy ==
=== Incumbents ===
| | Parish Priest |
|---|---|
| 1873 - | Fr D. J. Harrison (First Incumbent) |
| c.1873 - | Fr Hugh M’Sorley, MA |
| 1893–1896 | Fr Benjamin White Clinch |
| 1932-1945 | Revd Joseph Oscar De Vile |
| 1945–1947 | Fr Jack Plumley |
| 1957-1967 | Fr Desmond Curzon |
| 1978–1994 | Fr Alan Hopes |
| 1996–2006 | Canon Andrew Dangerfield |
| 2007–2011 | Fr Mark Elliott-Smith |
| | Vicar |
| 2011- | Fr Robert Wilkinson |

=== Curates ===
| | Curate |
|---|---|
| 1953–1955 | Fr Eric John Cooper |
| 1976–1983 | Fr Lamont Wellington Sanderson Phillips (NSM) |
| | Fr Stuart Wilson |
| 1973–1976 | Fr Stephen Taylor |
| 1978–1982 | Canon John Salter |
| 1982–1985 | Fr Tony Robinson |
| 1983–1986 | Fr John Hassell |
| 1985–1989 | Fr Nigel Orchard |
| 1986–1988 | Fr Christopher Darvill |
| 1988–1991 | Fr Jeffrey Vaughan (NSM) |
| 1988–1991 | Fr Paul Waters |
| 1991–1994 | Fr Nigel Massey |
| 1989 | Fr Nigel Asbridge |
| 1991–1993 | Fr Chris Eydon |
| 1994 - 1996 | Fr Peter Wilson |
| 1996–2001 | Fr Mark Elliott-Smith |
| 1999–2004 | Fr Jeremy Fox |
| 2000–2005 | Fr Tony Haynes (NSM) |
| 2002–2005 | Fr Colin Dickson |
| 2007–2011 | Fr James Hill |
| 2010–2012 | Fr Christopher Trundle |
| 2012-2013 | Fr Adrian Teare |

== References and sources ==
- 'Tottenham: Churches', A History of the County of Middlesex: Volume 5: Hendon, Kingsbury, Great Stanmore, Little Stanmore, Edmonton Enfield, Monken Hadley, South Mimms, Tottenham (1976), pp. 348–355.
