= St Dominic, Downham Market =

- Saint Dominic's Roman Catholic Church
- Location within Norfolk
- 52.602478°N 0.380237°E
- Location: Downham Market, Norfolk
- Country: England
- Denomination: Roman Catholic
- Website: www.saintdominics.org.uk

History
- Status: Active
- Founded: 1941
- Dedication: Saint Dominic
- Consecrated: 2006

Administration
- Diocese: Roman Catholic Diocese of East Anglia
- Deanery: Kings Lynn Deanery

Clergy
- Bishop: Alan Hopes
- Priest: Simon Leworthy

Saint Dominic's Church in Downham Market is the parish church serving the Roman Catholic population of Downham Market and the surrounding areas of Norfolk.

First opened in 1941, the church was finally fully consecrated upon receiving its stone altar in 2006. The parish received national attention in the 1970s when the then parish priest, Fr Oswald Baker, refused to adopt the new vernacular setting of the Mass.

The parish is part of the Roman Catholic Diocese of East Anglia.

== Mass times ==
Weekdays – 9.30 am, days as announced

Weekends – 6.00 pm Saturday evening (Vigil Mass), 9.30 am Sunday morning (Sung Mass)
