= Abbey of Saint Scholastica =

The Abbey of Saint Scholastica or St. Scholastica's Abbey may refer to:

- Abbey of Saint Scholastica, Subiaco, Italy
- Abbey of Saint Scholastica, Teignmouth, England
