= John Arendzen =

Dutch-born British Catholic priest (1873–1954)

John Peter Arendzen (6 January 1873, Amsterdam – 1954, Ware, Hertfordshire), was a Catholic priest who spread the Catholic faith in England. He was once named by the Daily Mail "one of the preachers of the century".

== Life ==
John Peter Arendzen was born in Haarlem, Amsterdam on 6 January 1873, one of nine children born to the distinguished artist and etcher Petrus Johannes Arendzen and his wife Epiphania Stracke. Four of their five sons became priests. In 1873 Petrus Arendzen was commissioned by the Dutch government to make copies of a number of Dutch paintings in English collections, and so brought his family to London. John Arendzen was educated privately at home and then attended St Mary's College, Oscott. St. Mary's was the diocesan seminary for the Diocese of Birmingham, but in fact functioned as a general seminary serving a number of dioceses. It was the practice of the Diocese of Westminster to send seminarians to St. Mary's. Arendzen was ordained in 1895. He served as a diocesan missioner.

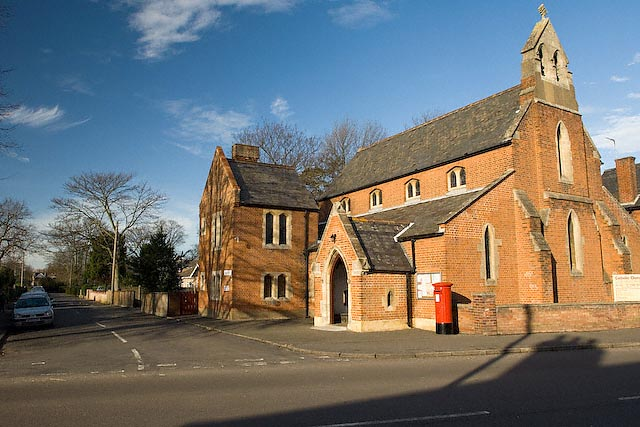
Church of The Sacred Heart, St Ives

From 1900 to 1903 he served as parish priest for Sacred Heart Church, St Ives, while matriculated at Christ's College, Cambridge, taking his BA in 1901. During his tenure at St. Ives, the small wooden church was replaced. With the opening of Our Lady and the English Martyrs Church in Cambridge in October 1890, the smaller St. Andrew's Church, which had been built in 1843 by Augustus Pugin, was no longer needed. In 1902 a local benefactor purchased the church and had it dismantled and brought by barge to All Saints parish in St. Ives. On 9 July 1902, the church was rededicated to the Sacred Heart by Bishop Riddell of the Diocese of Northampton. Father Arendzen gave a speech at the luncheon that followed.

In 1903 Arendzen became one of the original members of the Westminster Diocesan Missionary Society of Our Lady of Compassion, commonly known as the Catholic Mission Society, founded by Cardinal Vaughn. Upon the cardinal's death that same year, the project was continued by the small group of five priests he had gathered, which included his nephew, also named Herbert Vaughn.

He served at the mission of St John the Evangelist in Brentford, until April 1904. He and his brother Alphonse, also a member of the Catholic Missionary Society, both served at the parish of St Mary Magdalen in Willesden Green.

He became an expert in Arabic and was professor of Holy Scripture at St Edmund's College, Ware. He wrote a number of articles for scholarly journals, chiefly on the Old Testament.

He made many contributions to the Catholic Encyclopedia of 1913. He was also a religious book reviewer for the Dublin Review. Arendzen also wrote articles for the Journal of Theological Studies and the Jewish Quarterly.
