= Bridge School =

Bridge School may refer to:

- Bridge School Benefit, an annual concert held in Mountain View, California, United States
- Bridge School (California), United States
- Bridge School (Colorado), United States
- The Bridge School, Ipswich, in Suffolk, England
- Bridge School (Michigan), former school in Michigan, United States
