= Sacred Heart Church, St Ives =

Church in Cambridgeshire, England

Coordinates: 52.330°N 0.065°W

Sacred Heart
- Sacred Heart Roman Catholic Church
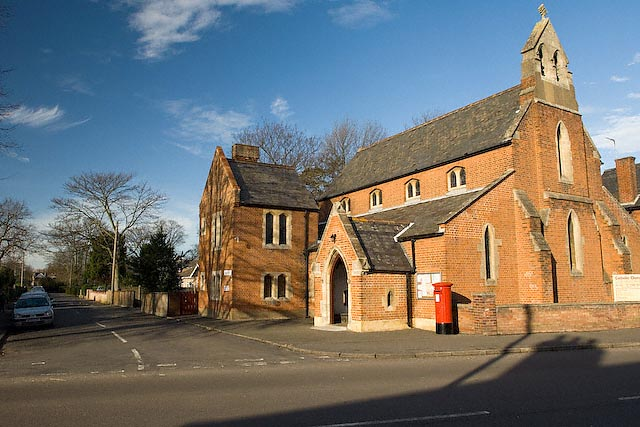
- Sacred Heart
- Location: 19 Needingworth Road, St. Ives, Cambridgeshire PE27 5JT
- Country: England
- Denomination: Roman Catholic
- Website: www.sacredheart-stives.org.uk

Architecture
- Style: Gothic Revival
- Years built: 1843/1902

Administration
- Diocese: Diocese of East Anglia

Clergy
- Vicar: Vacant since 25-Feb-24

Sacred Heart Church is a Roman Catholic church that serves as the parish church of St Ives, Cambridgeshire. It was originally designed and built by Augustus Pugin in Cambridge as St Andrew's Church, but was dismantled in 1902 and transported by barge to St Ives.

== History ==
By the end of the 19th century, enough Catholics had begun to return to St Ives to warrant the creation of a parish church. Initially, the parish was served by a small wooden building in East Street, but in 1902 a local businessman George Pauling purchased St Andrew's Church in Cambridge for £1000 and had it moved to St Ives. St Andrew's had been built in 1843 by Pugin to serve as Cambridge's parish church, but was superseded in 1890 by Our Lady and the English Martyrs Church. St Andrew's was dismantled, transported by barge and rebuilt in St Ives in less than five months. The new church was dedicated to the Sacred Heart.

== Architecture ==
Pugin was reportedly dissatisfied with the church, saying he "wished the earth would open and swallow that building". The church remains almost identical to its original construction, apart from reconstruction of the porch, and the repositioning of the font. Additional windows and a clerestory were added to give more light, and the rood screen was also removed. Unusually, the church sanctuary faces north west, rather than east.

Pugin's high altar is made from Caen stone and depicts the Lamb surrounded by the symbols of the Four Evangelists, between quarterfoils of winged angels. The altar was restored in 2002. The stained glass, also designed by Pugin, features the Madonna and Child, St Andrew and St Felix, patron of the diocese. Further windows have been added, including some to replace those damaged in 1906.

== Parish priests ==
- Rev. John Arendzen (1900–1903)
- Rev. Constantine Ketterer (1903–1909)
- Rev. James Purcell (1909–1942)
- Rev. Ethelbert Payne (1942–1950)
- Rev. Stephen Doupe (1950–1970)
- Rev. Bernard Nesden (1970–1977)
- Rev. John Drury (1977–1981)
- Rev. Raymond Kerby (1981–2001)
- Rev. Paul Maddison (2001–2010)
- Rev. Edward Trędota M.S. (2010-2015)
- Rev. Dr. Karol Porczak M.S. (2015–2019)
- Rev. Thomas Walton (2019–2024)
