= East Bergholt Abbey =

Abbey in Suffolk, England

Coordinates: 51.969487°N 1.0135438°E

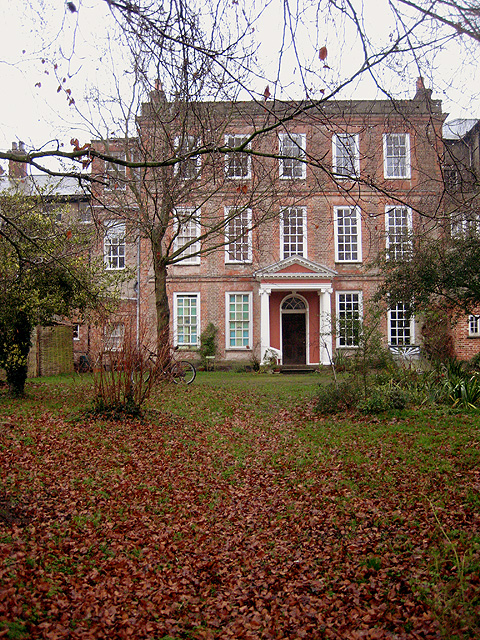
Old Hall, the old mansion façade, west front

East Bergholt Abbey was an abbey in East Bergholt, Suffolk, England. It was built on land purchased in 1857 on the site of Old Hall manor.

== History ==
=== Old Hall ===
Old Hall was the principal manor of East Bergholt. It was acquired in 1701 by Joseph Chaplain, wine cooper and High Sheriff of Suffolk, purchased the property in 1701, and built a manor house to replace an earlier Elizabethan structure. The property came into the possession of John Reade, who in 1801, commissioned John Constable to do a painting of the house. In 1806, Peter Godfrey bought the manor, and extended his holdings. Constable continued to visit, finding views to paint.

=== Convent of the Assumption of the Blessed Virgin Mary ===
The community dated back to one founded in Brussels specifically for English women in 1598 by Lady Mary Percy. With the French Revolution, the nuns returned to England in 1794, settling first at Winchester where they opened a school.

In 1856, Benedictine nuns purchased the estate from the Godfreys. Architect George Goldie was retained to adapt the manor house into a monastery. He added a chapel and a chapter house. The nuns farmed the land, and opened a school. In 1876 the school was closed, and the Order became an enclosed, contemplative community. The nuns baked their own bread, made their own wine and beer, kept bees, made butter and cheese, and participated in local agricultural shows. They also supplemented their income by making vestments. In lean times, they provided charitable assistance.

During World War II, the community of nuns was evacuated from the coast, some members went to Stanbrook Abbey, others to Swynnerton. The Abbey was requisitioned by the military. After the War, the building was in such poor condition that the nuns decided to sell the property and relocate to Haslemere. Haslemere closed in 1975 and the nuns dispersed to Stanbrook, Warwick, Oulton Abbey, and St Scholastica's Abbey. The last member of the community died in 1995.

=== Franciscan friary ===
In 1946, Franciscans established a friary on the grounds. The friars at East Bergholt served at Brantham and St Mark, Ipswich. Around 1973 most of the friars moved to Canterbury, while a few set up small friary at Ipswich. The property was sold in 1973.

=== Old Hall Community ===
The property is privately owned as communal housing.
