= Our Lady and the English Martyrs Church =

Coordinates: 52.198768°N 0.127348°E

Our Lady and the English Martyrs
- Church of Our Lady of the Assumption and the English Martyrs
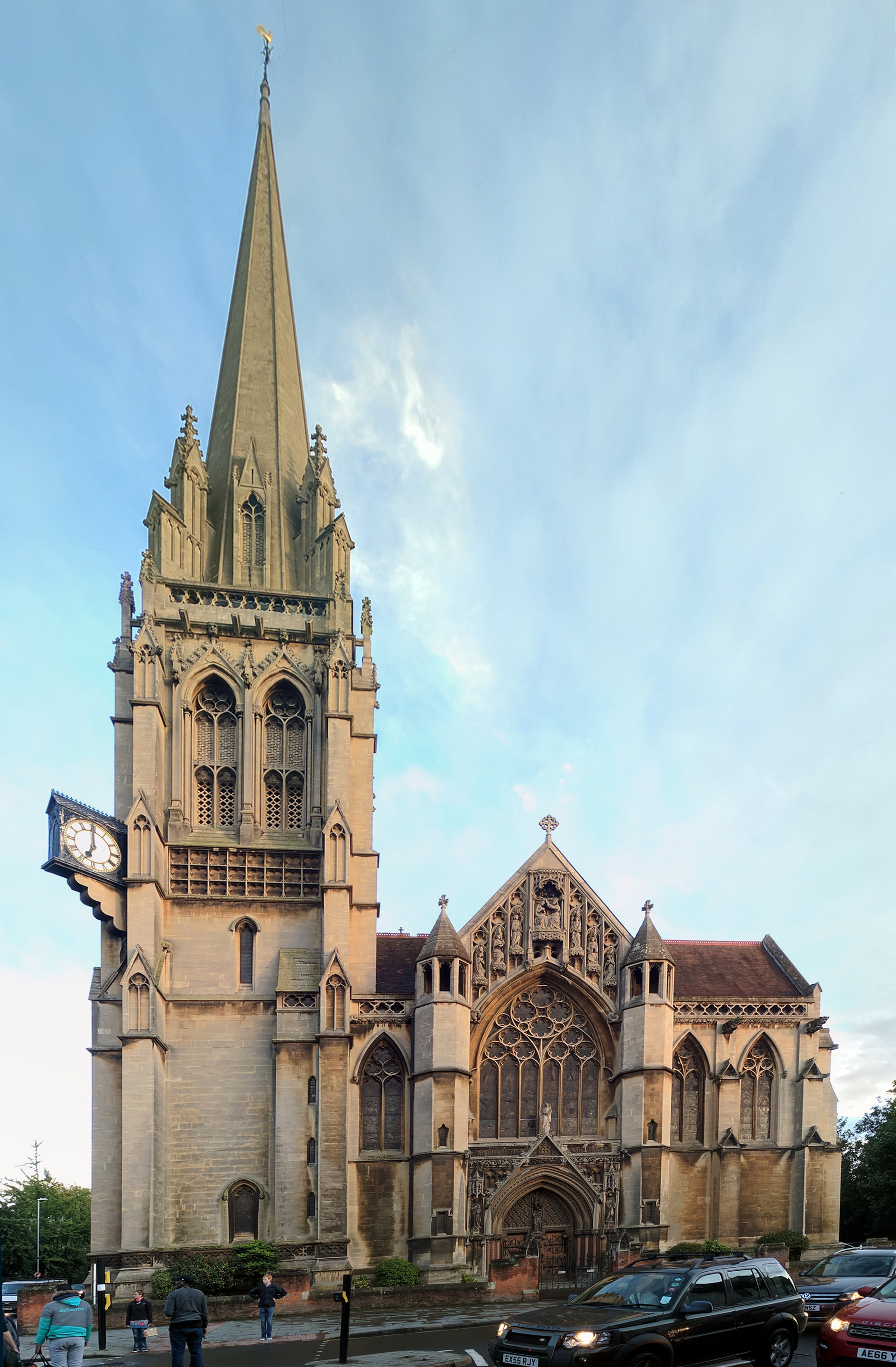
- The front (north side) of the church, from across Lensfield Rd.

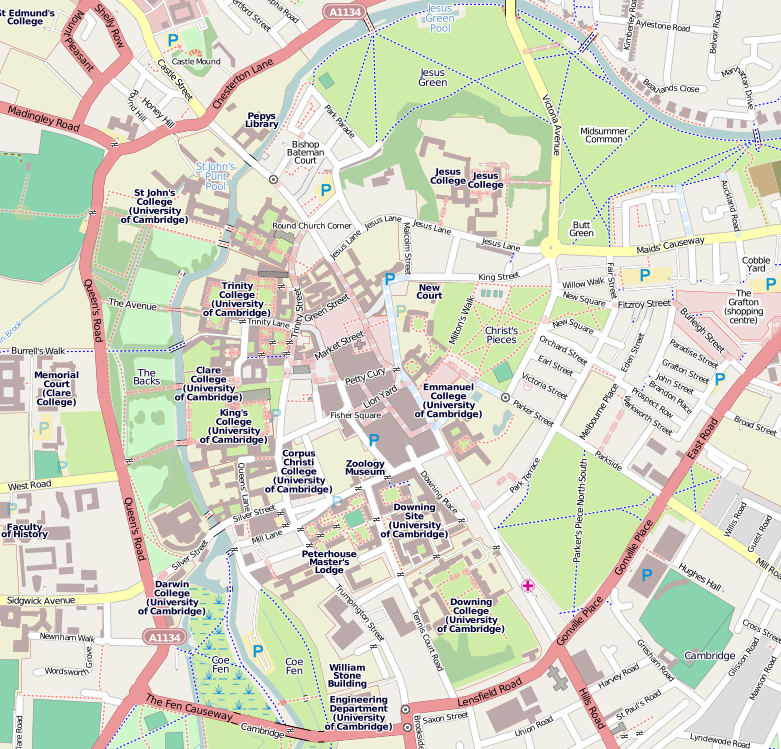
- Location within Central Cambridge
- Location: Hills Road; Cambridge; CB2 1JR
- Country: England
- Denomination: Roman Catholic
- Website: www.olem.org.uk

History
- Status: Parish church
- Dedication: Our Lady of the Assumption & the English Martyrs
- Consecrated: 8 October 1890

Architecture
- Functional status: Active
- Architect(s): Dunn & Hansom
- Style: Gothic Revival
- Years built: 1885–1890 (by Rattee and Kett)

Specifications
- Length: Interior: 48 metres (157 ft)
- Materials: Limestone (Casterton, Ancaster, Combe Down)

Administration
- Province: Westminster
- Diocese: East Anglia
- Deanery: Cambridge

Clergy
- Bishop(s): Rt Revd Peter Collins; Rt Revd Alan Hopes
- Rector: Rt Revd Mgr Provost Eugène Harkness
- Priest(s): Fr Adrian Gates (Hospital Chaplain); The Revd Bienn Carlo Manuntag

The Church of Our Lady of the Assumption and the English Martyrs, also known as the Church of Our Lady and the English Martyrs (OLEM), is a Catholic church in Cambridge, England. It is located on Hills Road, on the corner with Lensfield Road. Built between 1885 and 1890 in the Gothic Revival style, it is the tallest building in Cambridge at 65 metres (213 ft) tall (including the spire). The church is dedicated to Our Lady of the Assumption and the Forty Martyrs of England and Wales and is a Grade I listed building.

== Foundation ==
The first post-reformation Roman Catholic church, St Andrew's Catholic Church, was opened in Cambridge in 1843; this remained the only chapel available for Roman Catholics in Cambridge until the construction of OLEM. In 1865, the parish priest Canon Thomas Quinlivan acquired additional adjacent land, but funds could not be raised for construction. With the aid of the Duke of Norfolk, the Lensfield estate was purchased in 1879. The task of raising more funds fell to Quinlivan's successor, Monsignor Christopher Scott. On the Feast of the Assumption, 1884, the former ballerina Yolande Lyne-Stephens, widow of Stephens Lyne-Stephens, who was reputed to be the richest commoner in England, offered to provide £70,000 for construction of a church on the site (equivalent to £9.7 million in 2024).

The building work was undertaken by Rattee and Kett, and began in 1885, following plans of the architects Dunn and Hansom, and the foundation stone was laid in June 1887. The construction of a new Roman Catholic church on such a prominent site, as well as its dedication to the Forty Martyrs of England and Wales, caused much controversy among local Anglicans and members of the University. Despite the ill health of Mrs Lyne-Stephens the church was completed and then consecrated on 8 October 1890. The first Mass was attended by all the Roman Catholic bishops of England and Wales except for Cardinal Manning and Bishop Vaughan. St Andrew's Church was dismantled and re-built in St Ives, Cambridgeshire as Sacred Heart Church in 1902.

== History ==
After its opening, the church saw a great rise in the number of Catholics in the parish. This was partly due to Fr Robert Benson's reputation as a preacher, as well as Mgr Scott's work as parish priest. OLEM also hosted the 1921 Bible Congress, the greatest Catholic gathering in Cambridge since the English Reformation. Between 1922 and 1946, the church was used by the Cambridge Summer School of Catholic Studies.

In a 1941 air raid, a small bomb struck the sacristy, blowing a six-foot hole in the roof and another in the wall of the Sacred Heart chapel. The blast also shattered most of the windows and collapsed part of the organ gallery. The repairs, including replacement windows to the original designs, cost at least £35,000 (equivalent to £1.7 million in 2024).

In 2026 the church was added to the Heritage at Risk Register of Historic England.

== Architecture ==
The building, one of the largest Catholic churches in the United Kingdom, is designed in the Gothic revival style and follows the traditional cruciform layout. It features a polygonal apse and a central lantern tower. The construction includes Casterton stone for the foundation, Ancaster for the plinth, the remainder being Combe Down stone. The interior is constructed in Bath stone, Plymouth marble and Newbiggin stone. The spire, the tallest in Cambridge, reaches 214 feet (65 m) and can be seen for several miles.

The stained-glass windows depict, among other things, dedications of Cambridge Colleges and scenes from the lives of English martyrs, in particular St John Fisher.

To bring the sanctuary in line with the perceived liturgical directives resulting from the Second Vatican Council (1962–1965), its design and re-ordering was done by Gerard Goalen of Harlow. On 7 April 1973, Charles Grant, the Bishop of Northampton, consecrated the present central altar. The original high altar has subsequently been used mainly for reservation of the Blessed Sacrament.

The church was upgraded to Grade I listed building in 2022 from Grade II*.

=== Rectory ===
The rectory is immediately to the south of the church and dates from around 1890. In the Tudor style, of red brick with stone dressings and a castellated slate roof, it is a Grade II listed building.

== Renaissance statue ==
The church houses a mid-16th-century statue of the virgin and child, in oak and about half life size. The statue is said to have been discovered at Emmanuel College in 1850, and is supposedly the same statue that Thomas Cromwell ordered to be removed on 30 August 1538. A notice under the statue reads: "This ancient statue of Our Lady was formerly in the Dominican priory which occupied the site of Emmanuel College".

== Music ==
The Choir of Our Lady and the English Martyrs is semi-professional and includes former university choral scholars. A second choir, the Schola Cantorum, sings almost exclusively in Latin, and sings polyphony and Gregorian chant in the weekly solemn Latin Mass.

The organ was built in 1890 by Abbott and Smith to a specification by the composer Charles Villiers Stanford. The organ was renovated in 2002 by Nicholson & Co Ltd.

The belfry houses a ring of eight bells hung for change ringing, with a ninth for the Angelus. All the bells were cast in 1895 by John Taylor & Co of Loughborough. Each bell bears an inscription as follows: Treble B. Johannes Fisher o.p.n. (ora pro nobis) MDCCCXCV – Johannes Taylor fecit S Christophere o.p.n.; S. Felix o.p.n.; S. Gregori o.p.n.; S. Andrea o.p.n.; S. Petre o.p.n.; S. Joseph o.p.n.; Tenor Maria Immaculata Regina Angelorum o.p.n. MDCCCXCV Johannes Taylor fecit Angelus/Consecration Bell S. Thoma Cantuariensis o.p.n.

The tenor bell weighs 31 long cwt 2 qr 5 lb (3,533 lb or 1,603 kg), and is believed to be the largest in Cambridgeshire.

The chimes heard at each quarter-hour of the clock, made by Potts of Leeds, are based upon the "Alleluia" chant for the Easter Vigil.

== Gallery ==
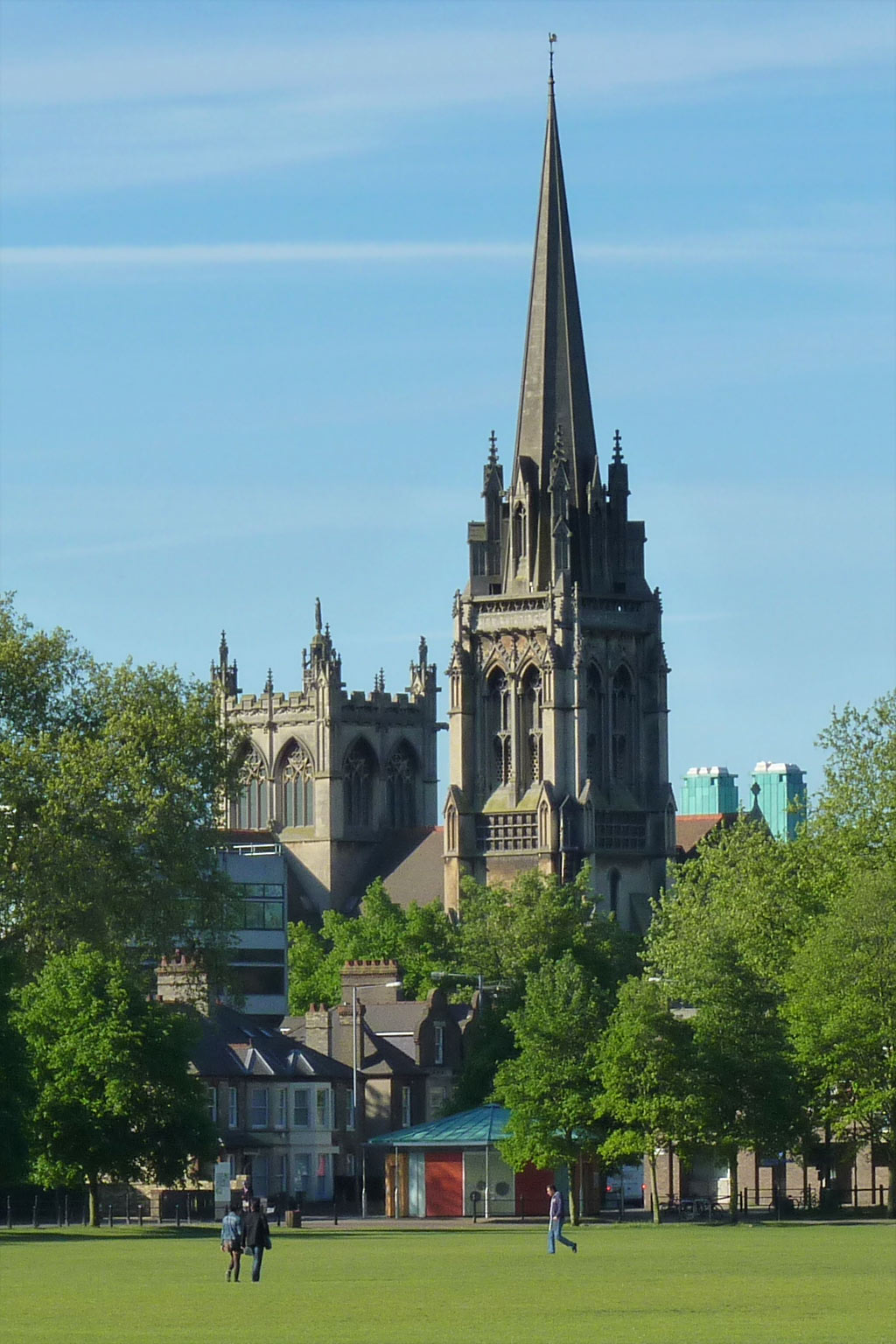
The church viewed from Parker's Piece

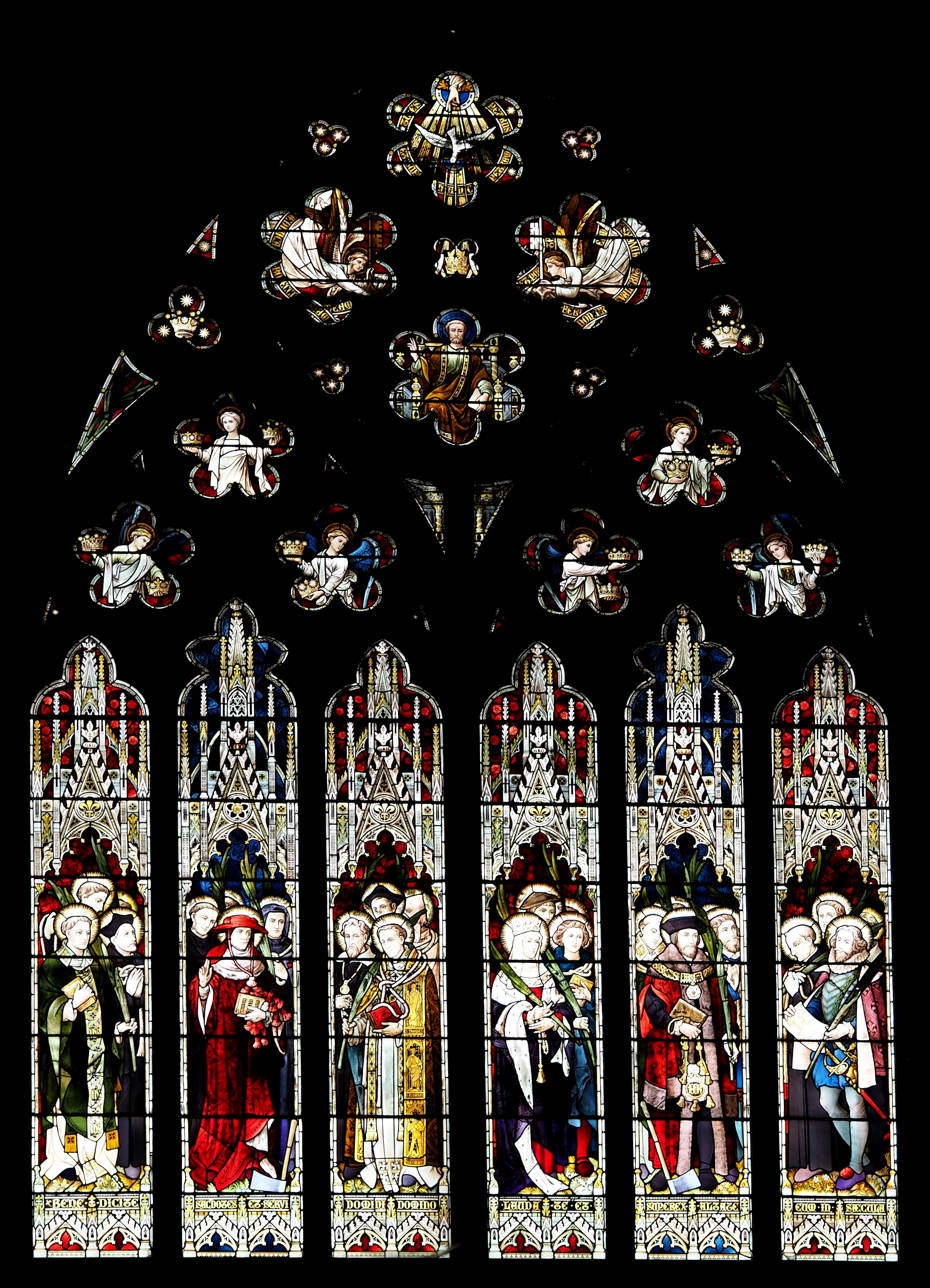
The (liturgical) west window

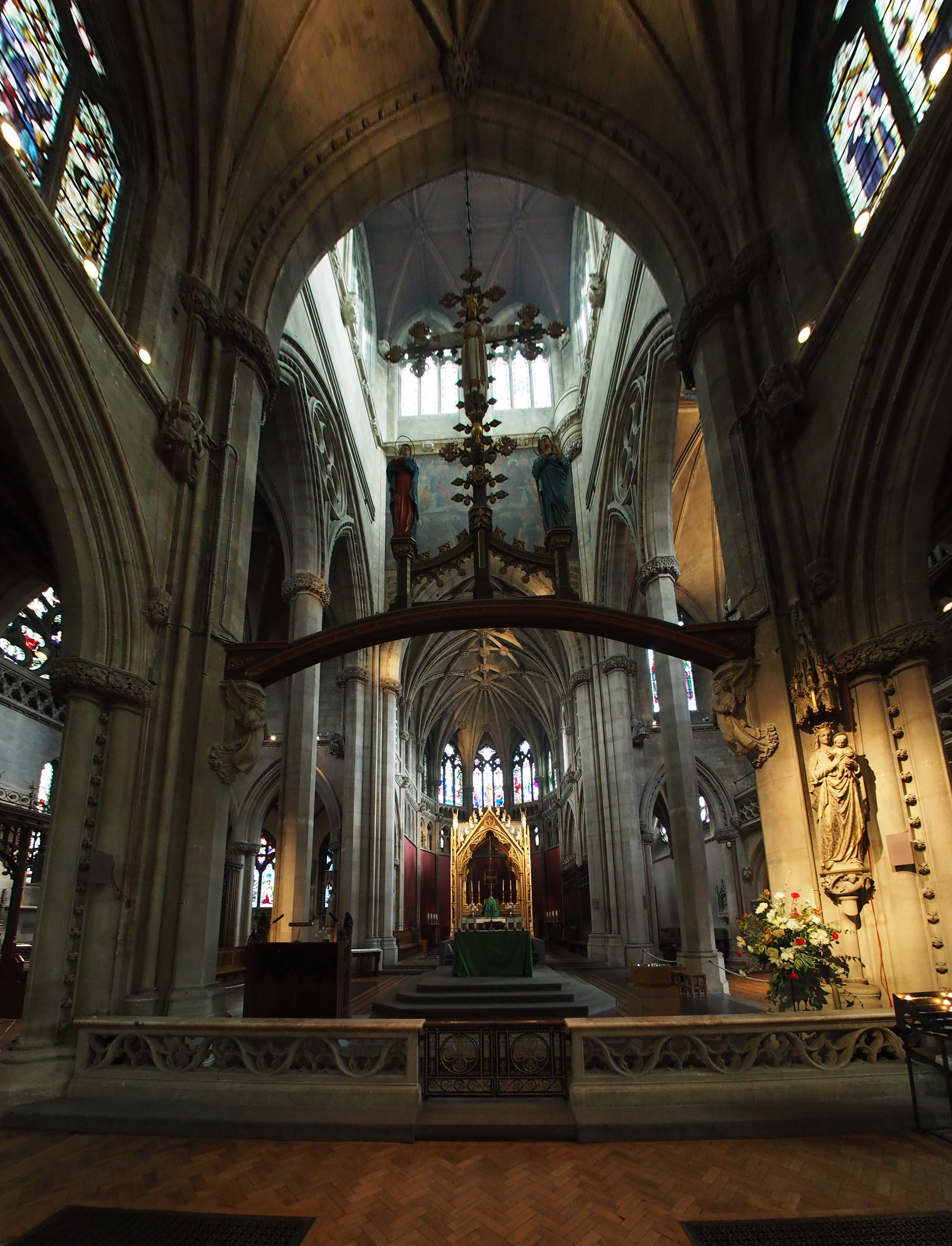
The sanctuary

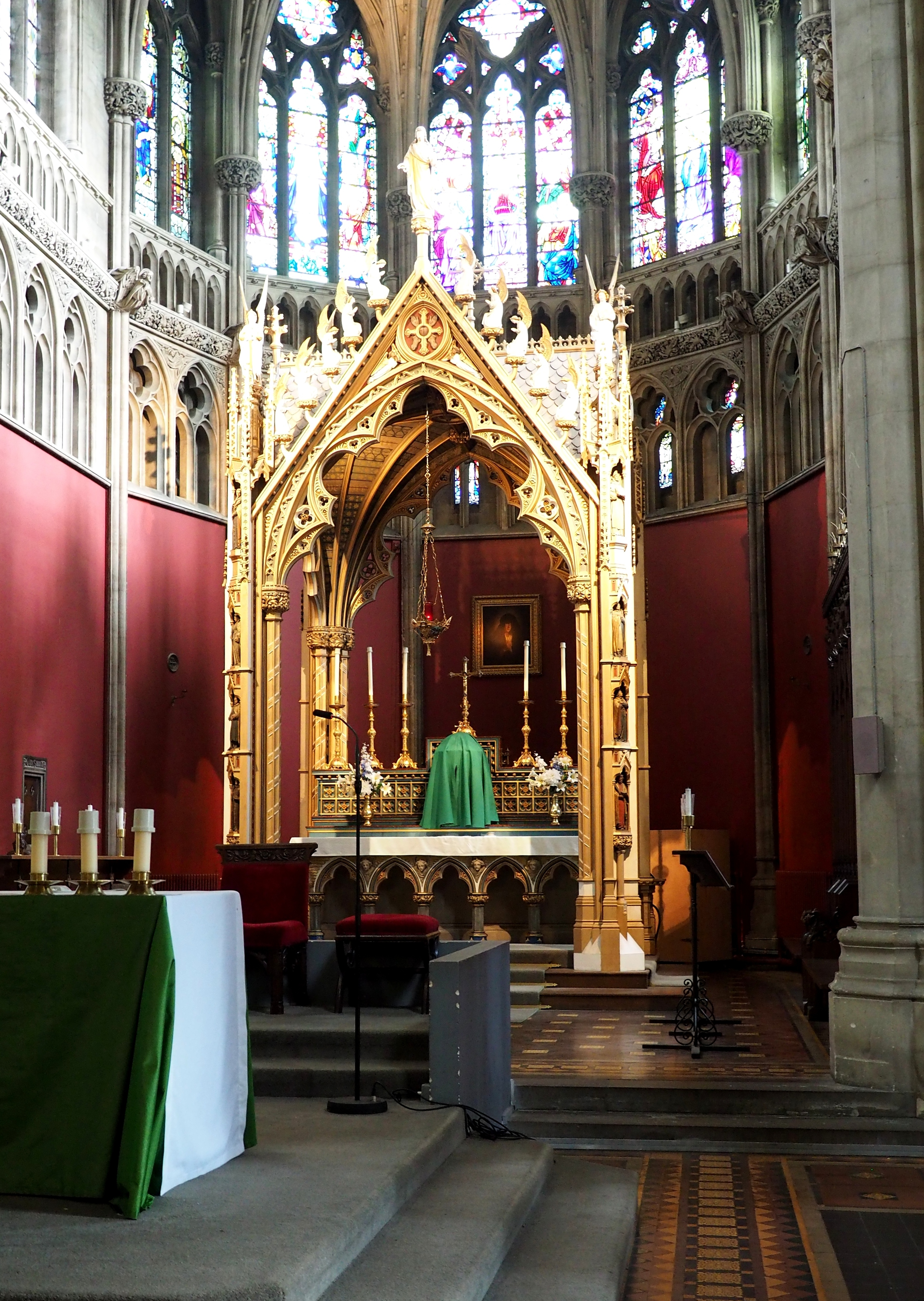
The high altar under the ciborium

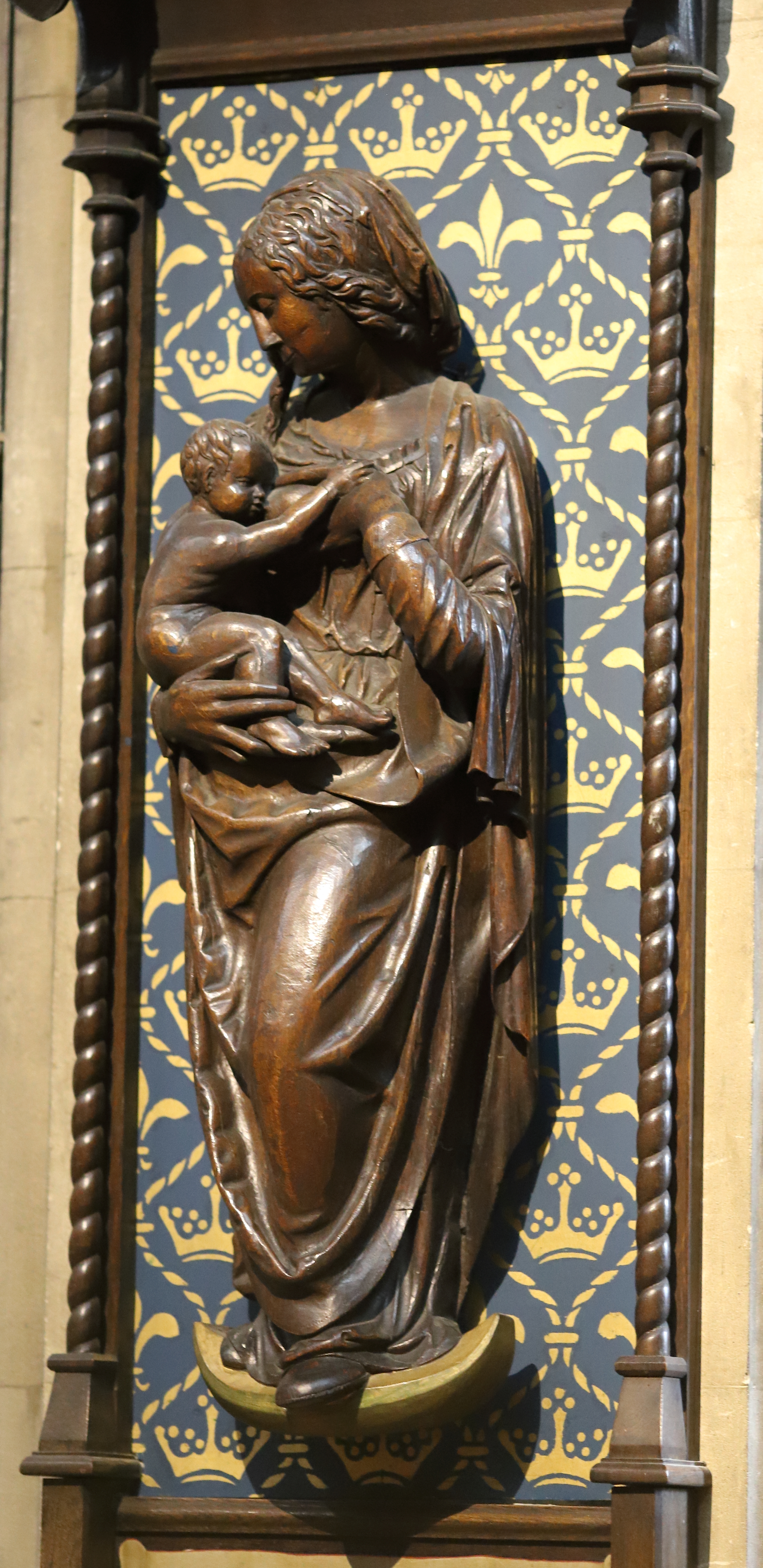
16th-century statue of the Blessed Virgin Mary

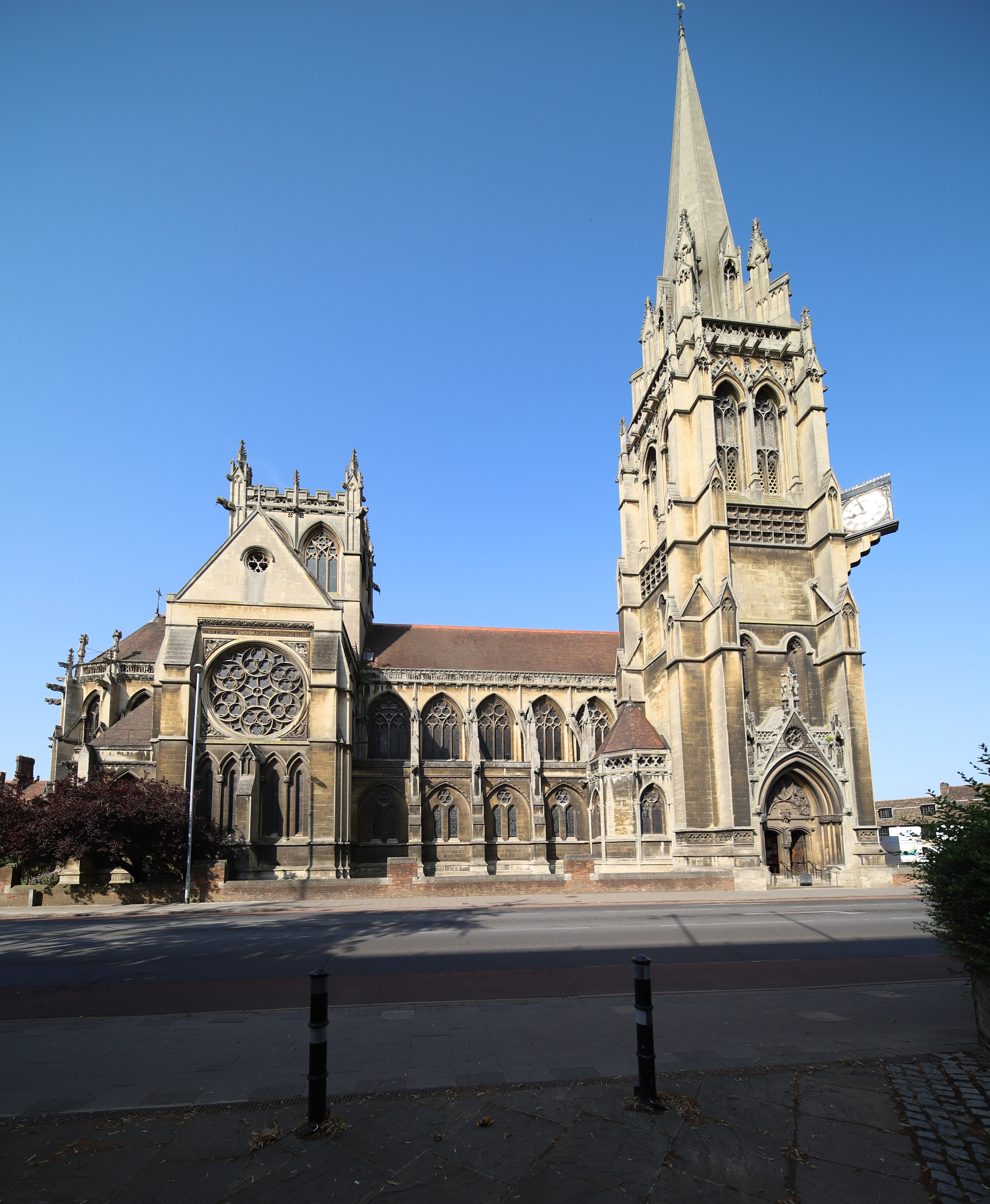
The east side of the church, from Hills Road
