= Diocese of East Anglia =

Catholic diocese in England

Diocese of East Anglia Diœcesis Angliæ Orientalis

Catholic
- Arms of the Roman Catholic; Diocese of East Anglia

Location
- Country: England
- Territory: Norfolk; Suffolk; Cambridgeshire; Huntingdonshire; Soke of Peterborough
- Ecclesiastical province: Westminster
- Deaneries: Bury St Edmunds, Cambridge, Great Yarmouth, Ipswich, King's Lynn, Norwich, Peterborough
- Coordinates: 52°24′11″N 0°54′11″E

Statistics
- Area: 12,570 km^{2} (4,850 sq mi)
- Population: Total; Catholics: (as of 2019); 2,487,200; 108,000 (4.3%)
- Parishes: 50
- Schools: 28

Information
- Denomination: Latin Church
- Rite: Roman Rite
- Established: 13 March 1976; 50 years ago
- Cathedral: St John the Baptist Cathedral, Norwich
- Patron saints: Our Lady of Walsingham, St. Felix, St. Etheldreda, St. Edmund
- Secular priests: 96

Current leadership
- Pope: Leo XIV
- Bishop: Peter Collins
- Metropolitan Archbishop: Richard Moth
- Vicar General: David Bagstaff
- Bishops emeritus: Alan Hopes

Map
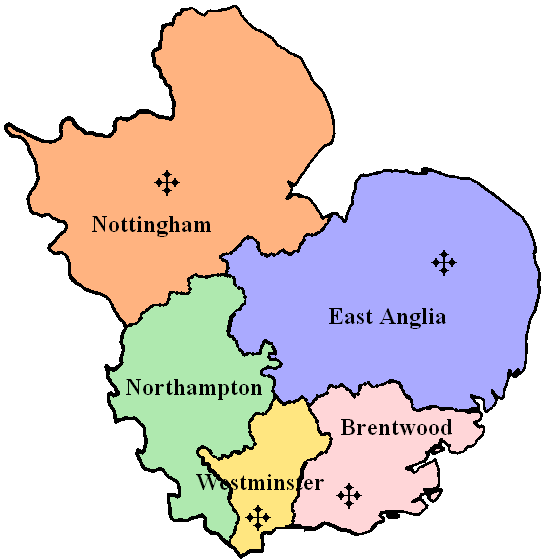
- Roman Catholic Diocese of East Anglia, within the Province of Westminster

Website
- RCDEA.org.uk

The Diocese of East Anglia (Latin: Diœcesis Angliæ Orientalis) is a Latin diocese of the Catholic Church covering the historic counties of Norfolk, Suffolk, Cambridgeshire and Huntingdonshire in the East of England, along with the Soke of Peterborough. The diocese makes up part of the Catholic Association Pilgrimage.

== Statistics ==
There are 85,309 members of the church, who belong to the 50 parishes in the diocese. The patrons of the diocese are Our Lady of Walsingham (24 September), St Felix (8 March), and St Edmund (20 November).

== Churches ==
The diocese is divided into seven deaneries, which are in turn divided into 50 parishes. Note that the list below is not exhaustive, and includes only notable parishes.

=== Deanery of Bury St Edmunds (St Edmund) ===
parish name	church	location	web	founded	building
St Edmund	St Edmund King & Martyr, Bury St Edmunds	Bury St Edmunds, Suffolk		1763	1837

Masses are also said at RAF Lakenheath, at Clare Priory, at the Monastery of Our Lady of Mount Carmel in Quidenham, at the care home of the Sisters of Our Lady of Grace and Compassion in Great Barton, and in the villages of Cavendish and Woolpit.

=== Deanery of Cambridge (St Andrew) ===
parish name	church	location	web	founded	building
Our Lady & the English Martyrs	Our Lady of the Assumption & the English Martyrs, Cambridge	Cambridge, Cambridgeshire		c. 1841	1890
St Laurence	St Laurence, Cambridge	Cambridge, Cambridgeshire		early C20th	1958
St Etheldreda	St Etheldreda, Ely	Ely, Cambridgeshire		c. 1890	1903
Sacred Heart	Sacred Heart, St Ives	St Ives, Cambridgeshire		late C19th	1902

Masses are also said at RAF Alconbury, at Blackfriars, the Dominican Priory of St Michael, Cambridge, at Fisher House University Chaplaincy, and in the villages of Bar Hill and Papworth Everard.

=== Deanery of Great Yarmouth (St Peter) ===
parish name	church	location	web	founded	building
Great Yarmouth	St Mary, Great Yarmouth	Great Yarmouth, Norfolk		1824	1850

^{1}No longer listed on diocesan website.

=== Deanery of Ipswich (St Edward) ===
- Aldeburgh with Leiston Parish
  - Our Lady & St Peter, Aldeburgh
- St James, Ipswich
- St Mark's Parish
  - St Mark, Ipswich
- St Mary's Parish
  - St Mary, Ipswich
- St Mary Magdalen, Ipswich
- St Pancras, Ipswich
- Woodbridge and Framlingham Parish
  - St Thomas of Canterbury, Woodbridge

=== Deanery of King's Lynn (St Wilfrid) ===
- St Dominic, Downham Market
- Basilica of Our Lady of Walsingham
- Our Lady & St Charles Borromeo, Wisbech

=== Deanery of Norwich (St Felix) ===
- Cathedral of St John the Baptist, Norwich

=== Deanery of Peterborough (St Hugh) ===
- St Peter & All Souls, Peterborough
  - Ukrainian Catholic Church of St Olga, Peterborough

== History ==
On 13 March 1976; 50 years ago, by the decree Quod Ecumenicum, Pope Paul VI formed the Diocese of East Anglia (from the counties of Cambridge, Norfolk and Suffolk) out of the Diocese of Northampton.

On 2 June 1976, the new diocese received its first bishop, Alan Clark. Bishop Clark had previously been auxiliary bishop of Northampton and co-chairman of ARCIC (Anglican/Roman Catholic International Commission), with the cathedral being established at the former parish church of St John the Baptist, Norwich. As the first bishop of the new diocese, Bishop Clark had to set up all the necessary instruments and commissions for the diocese to operate successfully. The establishment of the Diocesan Pastoral Council in 1987 strengthened these.

The diocese continued to grow with the development of the diocesan offices and diocesan tribunal attached to Bishop's House in Poringland near Norwich. Bishop Clark led a number of Lourdes pilgrimages.

== Ordinaries ==
- Alan Charles Clark (appointed on 26 April 1976 – retired on 21 March 1995)
- Peter David Smith (appointed on 21 March 1995 – translated to the Archdiocese of Cardiff on 26 October 2001)
- Michael Charles Evans (appointed on 14 February 2003 – died in office on 11 July 2011)
- Alan Hopes (appointed on 11 June 2013 - resignation accepted on 11 October 2022)
- Peter Collins (appointed on 11 October 2022 and installed on 14 December 2022)

== Pilgrimage ==
The diocese makes up part of the Catholic Association Pilgrimage.

== See also ==
- Buckden Towers
- Quidenham Hall
- Catholic Church in England and Wales
- List of Catholic churches in the United Kingdom
