= Chantry, Suffolk =

Area of Ipswich, Suffolk, England

Coordinates: 52.043742°N 1.1235320°E

Chantry
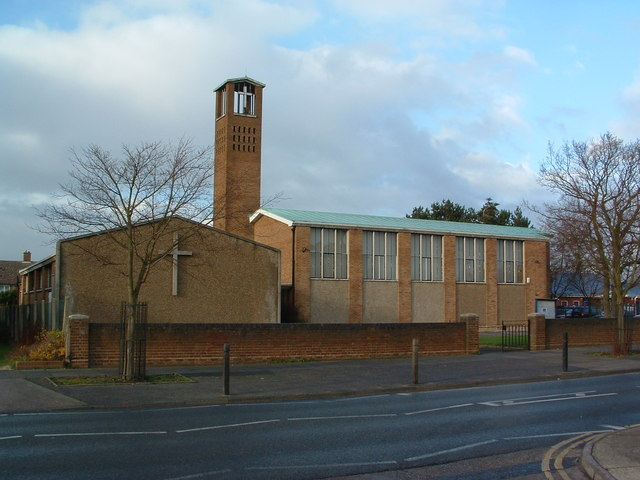

- Location within Suffolk
- District: Ipswich
- Shire county: Suffolk
- Region: East
- Country: England
- Sovereign state: United Kingdom
- UK Parliament: Ipswich

Chantry is a suburban residential area in the south west district of Ipswich, in the county of Suffolk, England. It lies west of Stoke. It has a population of over 30,000.

== Amenities ==
Chantry has a public library, several pubs, shopping parades, a community centre and health care providers. It is well served by public transport. Several churches are located in the area, including St. Francis in Hawthorn Drive, Shepherd Drive Baptist Church, St Mark's Roman Catholic church in Hawthorn Drive, Chantry Methodist Church and Greenfinch Church.

Chantry Academy serves the local area along with primary schools The Oaks, Sprites, Gusford, The Willows, St Marks Catholic Primary school and special school The Bridge. A sixth form college and a co-educational independent school St Joseph's College are nearby.

== Archaeology ==
A hoard of Roman era gold was discovered during building work in Holcombe Crescent in 1968, with the initial find consisting of five Romano-British gold torcs (decorative neck rings). The items show design features associated with the Iron Age La Tène culture, & are thought to date from around 75 BC. A sixth torc was found in the following year, some distance from the others but thought to be from the same collection. The find’s proximity to the Belstead Brook has led to speculation that this hoard was associated with a spring or holy well in the area. The torcs are now housed in the British Museum in London, with copies on show in Ipswich Museum.

== History ==
Chantry estate was built in the late 1950s and early 1960s, originally as an area of council housing to replace demolished housing stock near the water front of Ipswich. In recent years it has been extended with the development of private housing around the original development.

== See also ==
- Chantry Park
