= Alan Clark (bishop) =

British bishop

The Right Reverend Alan Charles Clark
- Bishop of East Anglia
- Province: Westminster
- Diocese: East Anglia
- Appointed: 26 April 1976
- Term ended: 21 March 1995
- Predecessor: New title
- Successor: Peter Smith
- Other post: Co-chairman of ARCIC
- Previous posts: Titular Bishop of Elmhama (1969 - 1976); Auxiliary Bishop of Northampton (1969 - 1976)

Orders
- Ordination: 11 February 1945
- Consecration: 13 May 1969 by Charles Alexander Grant

Personal details
- Born: Alan Charles Clark; 9 August 1919 Bickley, Kent, England
- Died: 16 July 2002 (aged 82)
- Denomination: Roman Catholic
- Motto: addictus ministerio Christi
- Coat of arms

Alan Charles Clark (9 August 1919 – 16 July 2002) was the first Roman Catholic Bishop of East Anglia in the Ecclesiastical Province of Westminster, England.

== Early life ==
Born in Bickley, Kent on 9 August 1919, Alan Charles Clark was the son of parents who converted from Anglicanism to Roman Catholicism. He was ordained to the priesthood on 11 February 1945.

== Episcopal career ==
Clark was appointed as an Auxiliary Bishop of Northampton and Titular Bishop of Elmhama by the Holy See on 31 March 1969. Two months after, he was consecrated to the Episcopate on 13 May 1969. The principal consecrator was Bishop Charles Alexander Grant of Northampton, and the principal co-consecrators were Archbishop Cyril Conrad Cowderoy of Southwark and Archbishop John Aloysius Murphy of Cardiff. He also became co-chairman of the Anglican—Roman Catholic International Commission (ARCIC).

On 13 March 1976, the new Diocese of East Anglia was established, and Alan Clark was appointed its first bishop on 26 April 1976. He was installed at the Cathedral Church of St John the Baptist, Norwich on 2 June 1976. As the bishop of the new diocese, Alan Clark had to set up all the necessary instruments and commissions for the diocese to operate successfully. He retired on 21 March 1995, Following his 75th birthday in August 1994, and assumed the title Bishop Emeritus of East Anglia. On 2 June 2001, Bishop Clark celebrated the 25th anniversary of his installation as the first bishop of the diocese.

Alan Charles Clark died on 16 July 2002, at the age of 82. He is buried at the National Catholic Shrine of Our Lady of Walsingham.

Catholic Church titles
| New title | Titular Bishop of Elmhama; 1969 - 1976 | Succeeded by Patrick Leo McCartie |
| New title | Bishop of East Anglia; 1976 - 1995 | Succeeded by Peter Smith |
