= Church of Our Lady and St Peter, Aldeburgh =

Roman Catholic church in Suffolk, England

Coordinates: 52°9′6.6″N 1°36′0.9″E

The Church of Our Lady and St Peter is a Roman Catholic church in Aldeburgh, Suffolk. It is part of the Diocese of East Anglia. The church is still not complete. A wood-paneled north wall indicates uncompleted plans for further extension. The building is aligned north–south rather than east–west, and the porch faces east. But stepping into the nave, you may be momentarily disorientated. That 'apse' is to the right, which intuitively should be liturgically east, and contain the sanctuary; but it is screened off, for use as a sacristy. Instead, you turn left to face the altar. The reason is simple - it is not an apse at all. It is all that remains of a round tower, one of Suffolk's few modern ones. When this church was built, it was intended to be very much in the style of the 40-odd round towered medieval churches that you find in the county, particularly along the coast.
