= Michael Evans (bishop) =

Roman Catholic Bishop (1951–2011)

The Right Reverend Michael Evans
- Bishop of East Anglia
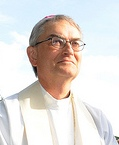
- Bishop Michael Evans at Walsingham, 2008
- Church: Roman Catholic Church
- Province: Westminster
- Diocese: East Anglia
- See: East Anglia
- Appointed: 14 February 2003
- Installed: 19 March 2003
- Term ended: 11 July 2011
- Predecessor: Peter Smith
- Successor: Alan Hopes
- Previous posts: Parish Priest until 2003, St. Augustine's, Tunbridge Wells

Orders
- Ordination: 22 June 1975
- Consecration: 19 March 2003 by Cormac Murphy-O’Connor

Personal details
- Born: Michael Charles Evans; 10 August 1951 Southwark, London, United Kingdom
- Died: 11 July 2011 (aged 59) Norwich, United Kingdom
- Buried: St John the Baptist Cathedral, Norwich
- Denomination: Roman Catholic
- Education: St. John's Seminary

Ordination history of Michael Evans
History
Priestly ordination
- Date: 22 June 1975
Episcopal consecration
- Principal consecrator: Cormac Murphy-O’Connor
- Co-consecrators: Michael George Bowen, Peter David Smith
- Date: 19 March 2003
- Place: St John the Baptist Cathedral, Norwich

Michael Charles Evans (10 August 1951 – 11 July 2011) was the third Roman Catholic Bishop of East Anglia, in the Ecclesiastical Province of Westminster.

== Biography ==
Ordained as a priest at Southwark on 22 June 1975, Michael Evans spent some time as an assistant priest, then studied for a Master of Theology degree at the University of London for four years (1975–1979) subsequently returning to St. John's Seminary, Wonersh, near Guildford for eight years as lecturer in Doctrine. During his time within the Roman Catholic Church, he held many posts, ranging from the chaplain of a convent school to chairman of the Archdiocese of Southwark's Justice and Peace Coordinating Committee. From 1995 until 2003, he served as Parish Priest at St. Augustine's church in Tunbridge Wells.

On 14 February 2003 Pope John Paul II appointed Evans as the third Bishop of East Anglia. succeeding Peter Smith, now Archbishop of Southwark; he was consecrated at the Cathedral Church of St John the Baptist, Norwich, on 19 March 2003.

On his appointment as the new bishop, Evans said: "I was astonished to be appointed as Bishop of East Anglia, and have a real sense of my unworthiness for this responsibility, but I accepted this new ministry with a joyful though nervous 'yes'. I look forward to getting to know the diocesan family of East Anglia, and to working with my brother priests and deacons as a team dedicated to the ministry of Christ. As I prepare for my ordination, I ask everyone to keep me in their prayers."

== Illness ==
In November 2006, Bishops Evans announced through the East Anglia Diocesan office in Norwich that he was suffering from prostate cancer and undergoing radiotherapy to treat the condition. He said he had been helped through his illness by the radiotherapy team at the Norfolk and Norwich University Hospital, support from the community and his faith in God.

"I am in the recovery period at the moment", the bishop said. "I have finished the radiotherapy sessions but I have no idea what the long term effects are. I will not find that out until at least next month when I have more tests ... I am much more tired than I was when I was having treatment and have had to rest a great deal. This is meant to be the worst time for side-effects and I am really feeling it ... It has been a real battle but I have had a lot of support from everyone and at no time did I even consider giving up. It is one of those things that you have to just keep fighting."

== Progression of cancer ==
On Sunday, 2 January 2011, Bishop Michael issued a statement through all the Catholic churches in the East Anglia Diocese. The following is an excerpt from this statement:

"In the last few weeks, the cancer has rather quickly taken control. My oncology and palliative care consultants informed me openly and honestly just before Christmas that I now probably have only weeks to live, and I am prepared for that as I can be, accepting it with faith as a gift of God's grace ... Rather than resign, I would like to continue among you as your bishop and the father of our diocesan family until this stage of my life ends. I do not know how long that will be. I am most grateful for the ways you have cared for and so prayerfully supported me in recent years. You remain very much in my thoughts and care. As I am sure you understand, I am able to do very little, and will need to rely on others. Please can I ask you to limit any expressions of care to prayer for now, rather than anything else to which I cannot respond."

The statement was issued to all Catholics in the East Anglia Diocese and received by all those who attended masses across the whole of the Eastern Region of England. Bishop Michael concluded the statement as follows:

"As I live now under the shadow of death, my prayer is very much that of St. Paul that I may know something of the power of Christ's resurrection and a share in his sufferings, trusting that the Lord is with me. I pray that even now, I can joyfully witness something of the good news we are all called to proclaim."

== Death ==
Evans died in the Norfolk and Norwich University Hospital at 7:10 pm on 11 July 2011, aged 59, of prostate cancer. His body was cremated following a traditional funeral Mass and his ashes were interred in the St John the Baptist Cathedral, Norwich. Evans was the first English Catholic bishop to choose to have his body cremated after his death.
