= Peter Smith (bishop) =

English Roman Catholic bishop (1943–2020)

The Most Reverend Peter Smith
- Archbishop Emeritus of Southwark
- Church: Catholic Church
- Archdiocese: Southwark
- Province: Southwark
- Appointed: 30 April 2010
- Installed: 10 June 2010
- Term ended: 10 June 2019
- Predecessor: Kevin McDonald
- Successor: John Wilson
- Previous posts: Bishop of East Anglia (1995–2001); Archbishop of Cardiff (2001–2010)

Orders
- Ordination: 15 July 1972
- Consecration: 27 May 1995 by Basil Hume

Personal details
- Born: Peter David Gregory Smith; 21 October 1943 Battersea, London, England
- Died: 6 March 2020 (aged 76) Chelsea, London, England
- Denomination: Roman Catholic
- Motto: Legis Plenitudo Caritas
- Coat of arms: Peter Smith's coat of arms

Ordination history of Peter Smith
History
Priestly ordination
- Date: 15 July 1972
Episcopal consecration
- Principal consecrator: George Basil Hume, O.S.B.
- Co-consecrators: Michael George Bowen, Alan Charles Clark
- Date: 27 May 1995
- Place: St John the Baptist Cathedral, Norwich
Episcopal succession
Bishops consecrated by Peter Smith as principal consecrator
- Michael Charles Evans: 19 March 2003
- Philip Anthony Egan: 24 September 2012

Styles of Peter Smith
- Reference style: The Most Reverend
- Spoken style: Your Grace
- Religious style: Archbishop

Peter David Gregory Smith (21 October 1943 – 6 March 2020) was an English prelate of the Catholic Church, having served as archbishop of the Archdiocese of Southwark. He had previously served as the Bishop of East Anglia (1995–2001), Metropolitan Archbishop of Cardiff (2001–2010) and Metropolitan Archbishop of Southwark (2010–2019).

== Early life ==
Smith was born on 21 October 1943 in Battersea, London, England. He was educated at Clapham College, then an all-boys Catholic voluntary-aided grammar school. He studied at Exeter University, where he earned his bachelor's degree in law. He then undertook studies for the priesthood at St. John's Seminary in Wonersh and the Pontifical University of St. Thomas Aquinas (Angelicum) in Rome (earning his doctorate in canon law).

== Ordained ministry ==
Smith was ordained to the priesthood on 5 July 1972. After doing pastoral work from 1972 to 1974, Smith began teaching canon law at his alma mater, St John's Seminary, Wonersh, in 1977. He then served as a curate in Thornton Heath (1984–1985) and as the rector of St John's Seminary (1985–1995).

=== Episcopate ===
On 21 March 1995, Smith was appointed Bishop of East Anglia by Pope John Paul II. He received his episcopal consecration on the following 21 May from Cardinal Basil Hume OSB, with Archbishop Michael George Bowen and Bishop Alan Charles Clark serving as co-consecrators. Smith was later named Archbishop of Cardiff on 26 October 2001, following the resignation of the Capuchin, John Ward, amid a controversy about paedophile priests in the archdiocese. In regard to these sexual abuse cases, Smith declared that he "wanted to help people bind up the wounds and bring healing". He also voiced his opposition to living wills in 2004, fearing that "a proxy could make a decision to do away with someone for the motive of killing someone".

Smith has been chair of the Catholic Truth Society and the Department for Christian Responsibility and Citizenship within the Catholic Bishops' Conference of England and Wales from 1998 to 2019. He was also chairman of the Central Religious Advisory Committee (CRAC) of the BBC and ITC from 2001 to 2004. In 2002 he was made a sub-prelate and chaplain of the Venerable Order of Saint John. In 2004 he was made an Honorary Fellow of the University of Wales, Lampeter and also of Cardiff University in 2006. On 30 April 2010, Smith was named as the Archbishop of Southwark, replacing Archbishop Kevin McDonald who resigned the see due to ill health. He was installed on 10 June 2010. He also served as Master of the Guild of Our Lady of Ransom from 2010. On 28 October 2015, Smith opened the new Saint Jude Information Centre during the 60th anniversary of the Shrine of Saint Jude. He was made a Guild Life member by Fr Kevin Alban in 2016. On 10 June 2019, Smith's resignation from the pastoral care of the Archdiocese of Southwark was accepted by Pope Francis, and Bishop John Wilson was named as his successor. He remained as Apostolic Administrator until 25 July 2019.

== McSweeney controversy ==
In March 2015 it was heard at Southwark Crown Court that Smith was one of two bishops responsible for allowing Anthony McSweeney to be appointed as a priest in the Roman Catholic Diocese of East Anglia following an incident in 1998 in which "a housekeeper found what she said were pornographic images at his [McSweeney's] home". The matter was regarded by Smith as an incident for clergy discipline and not investigated by the police. McSweeney has since been jailed for abusing boys at the Grafton House children's home between 1978 and 1981.

== Retirement and death ==
Smith retired to the Kent coast in 2019, but by early 2020 had been diagnosed with cancer. He died in the Royal Marsden Hospital, Chelsea just before midnight on Friday, 6 March 2020.

Catholic Church titles
Preceded by Alan Clark	Bishop of East Anglia; 21 March 1995—26 October 2001	Succeeded by Michael Charles Evans
Preceded by John Aloysius Ward, OFM Cap	Archbishop of Cardiff; 26 October 2001—10 June 2010	Succeeded by George Stack
Preceded by Kevin McDonald	Archbishop of Southwark; 10 June 2010—10 June 2019	Succeeded by John Wilson
