= Peter Collins (bishop) =

British Catholic bishop

The Right Reverend Peter Collins
- Bishop of East Anglia
- Church: Roman Catholic Church
- Province: Westminster
- Diocese: East Anglia
- See: East Anglia
- Appointed: 11 October 2022
- Installed: 14 December 2022
- Predecessor: Alan Hopes

Orders
- Ordination: 14 July 1984
- Consecration: 14 December 2022 by Alan Hopes
- Rank: Bishop

Personal details
- Born: Peter Gwilym Collins; 13 May 1958 (age 68)
- Denomination: Roman Catholic
- Education: Royal English College, Valladolid; Comillas Pontifical University

Ordination history of Peter Collins
History
Episcopal consecration
- Principal consecrator: Alan Hopes
- Co-consecrators: George Stack; Mark O'Toole

Peter Gwilym Collins (born 13 May 1958) is a British Roman Catholic prelate. On 11 October 2022 he was appointed by Pope Francis as Bishop of East Anglia, succeeding Alan Hopes. He was consecrated Bishop and installed in the Diocese of East Anglia on 14 December 2022.

== Biography ==
Collins was born on 13 May 1958 in Tredegar, Monmouthshire. From 1978 until his ordination, he attended the English College, Valladolid in Spain. He obtained a Licentiate in Dogmatic Theology at the Comillas Pontifical University in Madrid.

He was ordained a priest on 14 July 1984 for the Archdiocese of Cardiff. He first served as a parish vicar at St David's Cathedral in Cardiff from 1984 to 1989. He returned to his alma mater, and was vice-rector of the English College of Valladolid from 1989 to 1994. Returning to parish ministry, he was parish priest of Chepstow, Caldicot and Magor (1995-2001), and then dean and administrator of St David's Cathedral in Cardiff (2001-2019). From 2019 until his elevation to the episcopate, he served as parish priest of Saint Mary of the Angels and Holy Family in Cardiff, diocesan representative for Safeguarding, President of the Diocesan Commission for Education and President of the Presbyteral Council. He was also a member of the Cathedral Chapter of the Archdiocese of Cardiff.

On 11 October 2022, it was announced that Pope Francis had appointed him as the next bishop of the Diocese of East Anglia, in succession to Alan Hopes. He was consecrated as a bishop on 14 December 2022, during a service at St John the Baptist Cathedral, Norwich. The principal consecrator was his predecessor Hopes, and the principal co-consecrators were George Stack, Archbishop Emeritus of Cardiff, and Mark O'Toole, Archbishop of Cardiff.

Catholic Church titles
Preceded by Alan Hopes	Bishop of East Anglia; 2022 - Present	Incumbent
