= St Mary, Woodbridge Road =

Coordinates: 52.0610°N 1.1738°E

St Mary, Ipswich
- Saint Mary
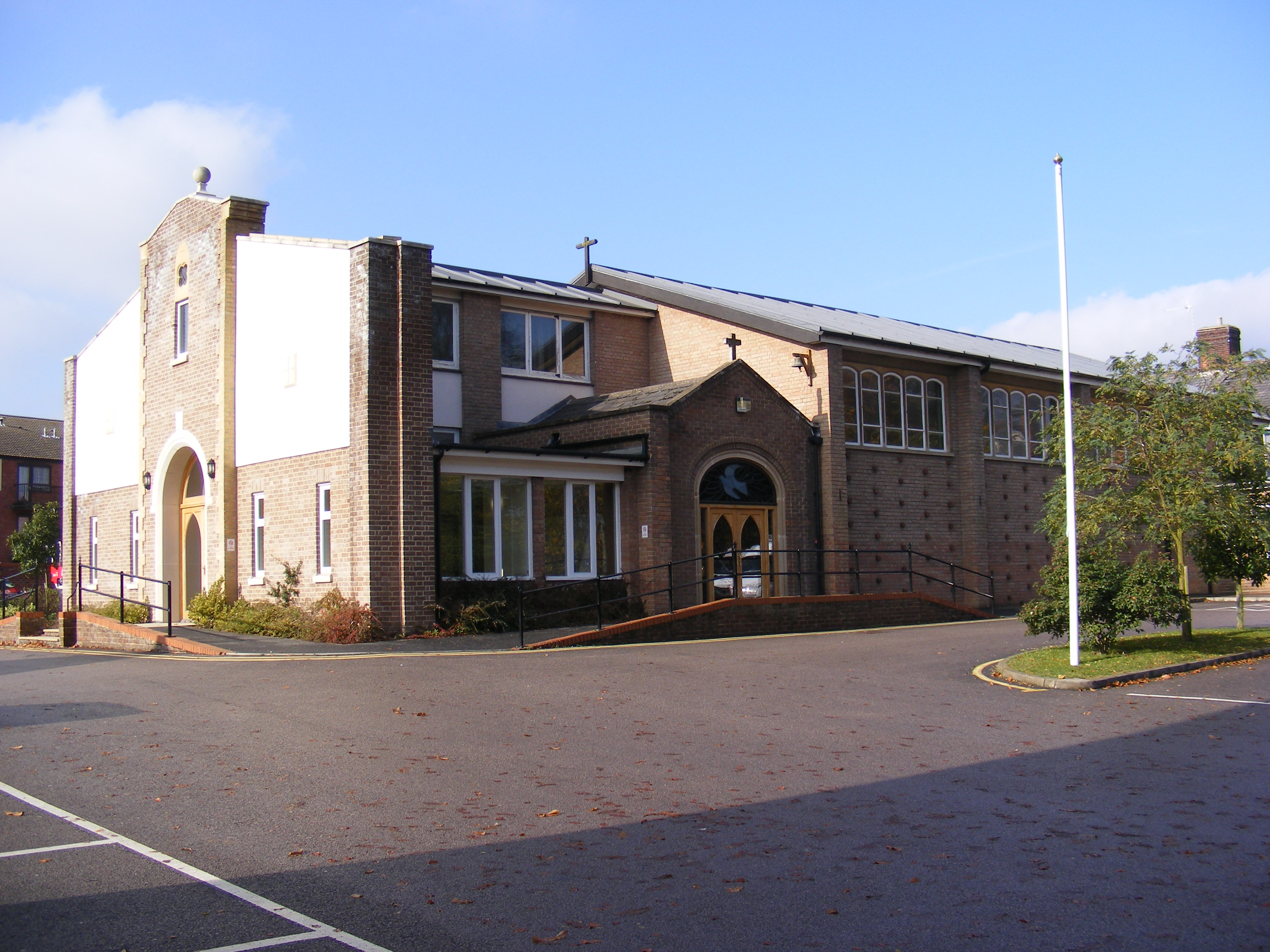
- Saint Mary's church

- Location in Suffolk
- Location: Ipswich, Suffolk
- Country: England
- Denomination: Roman Catholic
- Website: http://www.st-mary.org.uk/

History
- Dedication: Saint Mary

Administration
- Diocese: Roman Catholic Diocese of East Anglia

St Mary's, often called St Mary Woodbridge Road, is a Catholic church in Ipswich which has the largest congregation in the town and the second largest congregation in Suffolk. Its parish hall is the site of the first post reformation Catholic church in Ipswich, St Antony. It is part of the Diocese of East Anglia.

== History ==
St Mary's was founded by a French priest, Abbé Louis Pierre Simon, when he escaped from the threat of the French Revolution and settled in Ipswich to teach. He was offered lodgings by a Catholic woman, Miss Margaret Wood, who later became his friend.

Due to the prevalence of the revolution, Catholics found it hard to profess their faith in public at the time. Père Simon was able to gather the local Catholics into one community through his faithful pastoral work. When the French wars were over, Père Simon decided to devote his life to working for the community in Ipswich. He bought a house in Albion Hill (now known as Woodbridge Road), which is presently used as a convent for nuns. Despite objections from the townspeople, Père Simon was able to add a small chapel dedicated to St Anthony.

The chapel was consecrated on 1 August 1827 by the Vicar Apostolic Dr Thomas Walsh, and was attended by a number of individuals. It was soon found to be small, so the structure was enlarged to the northern and southern area, opening directly to Woodbridge Road. The new nave is 76 feet long.

Dr. Walsh blessed the extended chapel on 10 October 1838, which was dedicated to Mary.

Père Simon and Margaret Wood are both remembered by their plaques in the parish hall, which was the church they founded.
