= Anti-Catholic riots =

Anti-Catholic riots were a phenomenon, particularly in the English speaking world, which tended to accompany the lifting of legal sanctions against the Catholic minority in these countries.

Historian Linda Colley draws comparisons between anti-Catholic riots and witch hunts.

Examples of anti-Catholic riots included:

- Philadelphia nativist riots
- Bath, Maine anti-Catholic riot of 1854
- Gordon Riots in London
- 1969 Northern Ireland Riots
