= Church of St Thomas of Canterbury, Woodbridge =

Roman Catholic church in Suffolk, England

Coordinates: 52°5′39.9″N 1°19′7.8″E

The Church of St Thomas of Canterbury is a Roman Catholic church in St John's Street in Woodbridge, Suffolk.

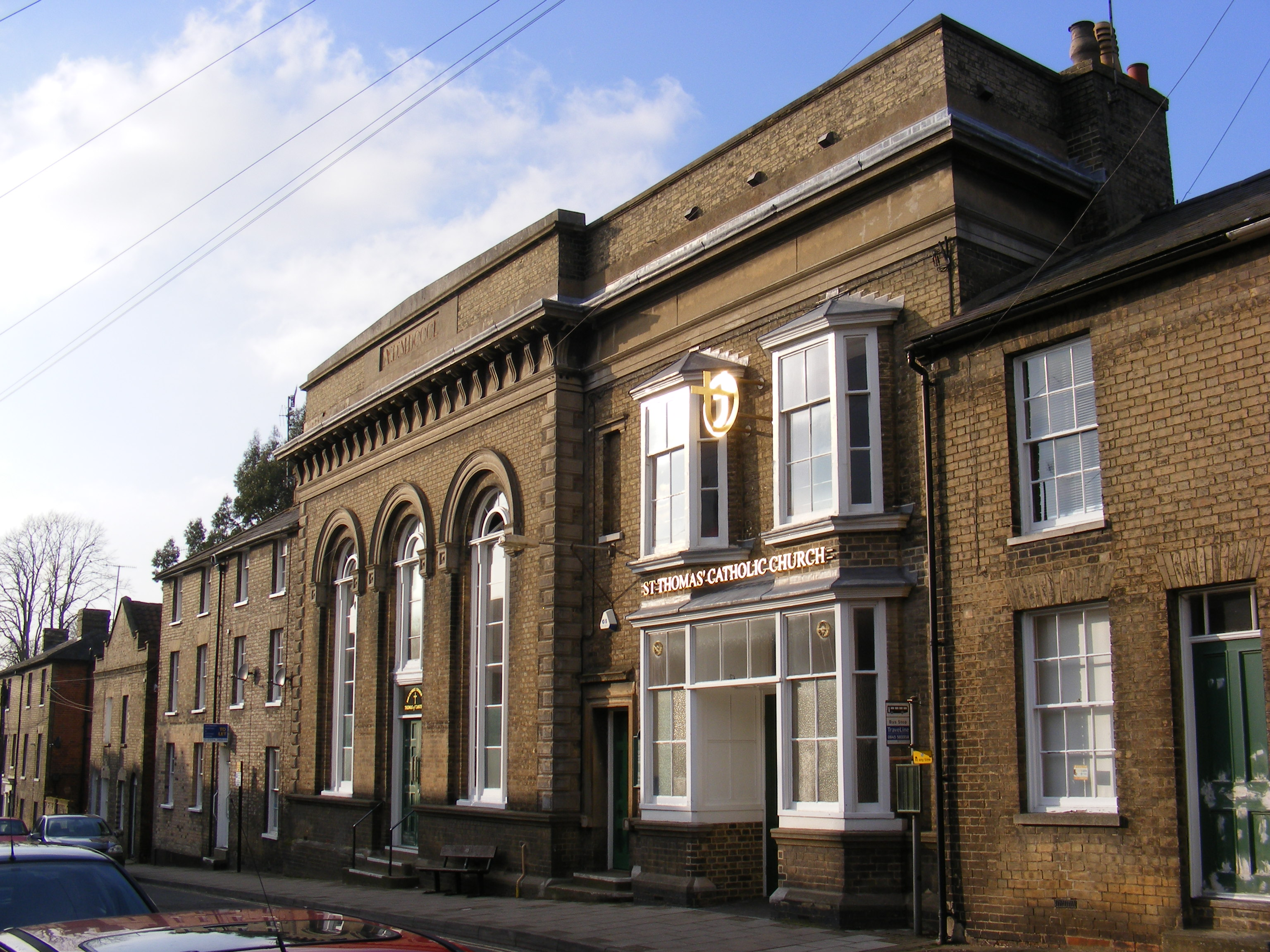

It has been part of the Catholic Diocese of East Anglia since 1976, and before that was in the Diocese of Northampton. It forms a joint parish with Framlingham. It was built in 1850. It was originally a YMCA but in 1929 it was converted into a Catholic church.
