= Teignmouth Abbey =

Former abbey in Devon, England

Coordinates: 50.556879°N 3.4903°W

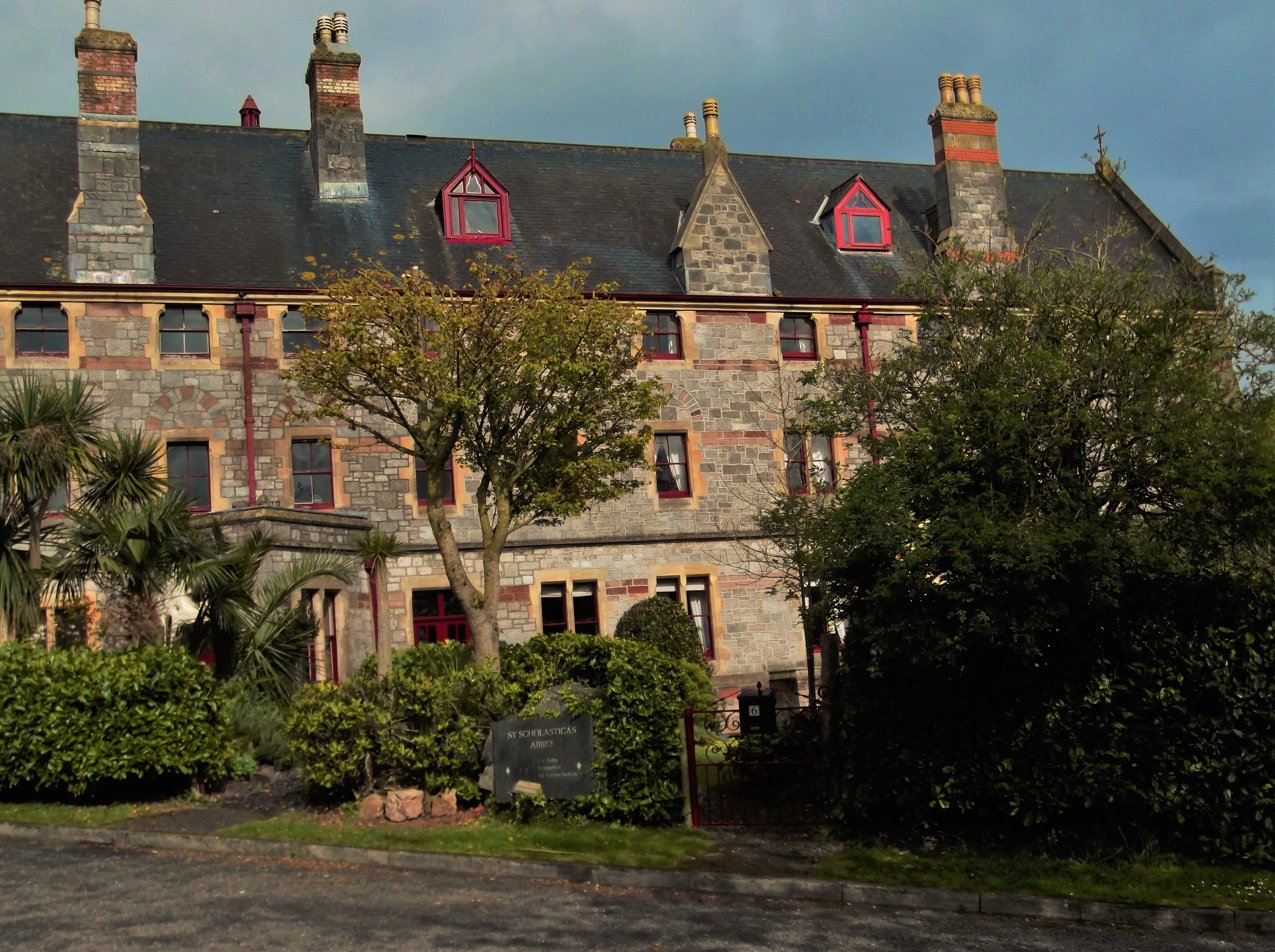
St Scholastica's Abbey, Teignmouth

Teignmouth Abbey or St. Scholastica's Abbey is a former abbey in Devon, England.

== History ==
The Benedictine community at Teignmouth dated back to the establishment of the first English Benedictine convent on the continent, founded in Brussels in 1598 by Lady Mary Percy. From Brussels, Dame Lucy Knatchbull, Magdalene Digby, sister of Everard Digby, and several other nuns established a daughter house in Ghent in 1624. In 1662, Ghent founded, in turn, a daughter house in Dunkirk. In 1784, the sister community at Pontoise was dissolved with the nuns joining those at Dunkirk. According to Bede Camm, the Teignmouth community had a reliquary cross supposedly from Fountains Abbey. It is traditionally believed that it was brought to them by Lady Abbess Messenger of Pontoise, who was related to the owners of Fountains.

In 1793, the convent at Dunkirk was sacked by revolutionaries and the religious imprisoned at Gravelines for eighteen months. Eleven of them died before permission was granted for the removal of the community to England. They arrived in London in May 1795 and took up residence in an old convent in Hammersmith.

It was built in 1863 by George Goldie for a community of Benedictine nuns, who transferred from Hammersmith, London, where they had been since fleeing Dunkirk around the time of the French Revolution. When the Benedictine community at Haslemere (of the former East Bergholt Abbey) was dispersed in 1975, some of the nuns went to Teignmouth.

The building is grade II listed and has been converted to private apartments. The Abbey Lodge is now a private house.
