= The Bridge School, Ipswich =

The Bridge School

Location
- Sprites Lane; Ipswich, Suffolk, IP8 3ND; England; 52.039576°N 1.105610°E

Information
- Type: Special school Academy
- Established: 2010; 16 years ago
- Local authority: Suffolk
- Trust: Unity Schools Partnership
- Department for Education URN: 147162 Tables
- Ofsted: Reports
- Headteacher: Tina Sharman
- Gender: Coeducational
- Age: 4 to 16
- Enrollment: 180
- Capacity: 180
- Website: www.thebridgeschool.org.uk

The Bridge School is a coeducational special school located in Ipswich in the English county of Suffolk.

The school was formed in 2010 as a result of the merger of Heathside Primary School and Belstead School, both of which were designated as special schools. The school has 20 nursery pupils, 100 primary and 60 secondary.

The schools are located on one single site in Sprites Lane in Ipswich following completion of the new Primary School on land adjacent to the Secondary School. The secondary school educates children from ages 11 to 16 The primary campus has a nursery attached to it which children can join from age 3.

The school is previously governed by an IEB or Interim Executive Board. However Suffolk County Council confirmed by letter on 8 February 2018 that there were no plans to convert the school to an academy following mixed communications and parent pressure. Despite this the school converted to academy status on 1 June 2019 and is now sponsored by the Unity Schools Partnership.
