= Bishop of East Anglia (modern) =

Roman Catholic bishopric in Westminster, England

- Bishopric

catholic
- Incumbent: Peter Collins (bishop)

Location
- Ecclesiastical province: Westminster

Information
- First holder: Alan Charles Clark
- Established: 13 March 1976
- Diocese: East Anglia
- Cathedral: St John the Baptist, Norwich

The Bishop of East Anglia is the Ordinary of the modern Roman Catholic Diocese of East Anglia in the Province of Westminster, England.

The incumbent is Bishop Peter Collins, who was installed on 14 December 2022. His appointment was announced on 11 October 2022, the same day that his predecessor, Bishop Alan Hopes, retired. Hopes was appointed Apostolic Administrator to oversee the diocese until the installation of his successor.

== History ==
The Diocese of East Anglia covers an area of 12,570 km^{2} (4,900 sq mi) and spans the counties of Norfolk, Suffolk, Cambridgeshire and the unitary authority of Peterborough, and was formed by Papal decree on 13 March 1976. Prior to this the area came under the jurisdiction of the Diocese of Northampton. The Episcopal see is in the city of Norwich where the bishop's seat is located at the Cathedral Church of St John the Baptist.

== List of the Bishops of East Anglia ==
Bishops of East Anglia
From	Until	Incumbent	Notes
26 April 1976	21 March 1995	Alan Charles Clark	Formerly an auxiliary bishop of Northampton (1969–1976). Appointed Bishop of East Anglia on 26 April 1976. Retired on 21 March 1995 and died on 16 July 2002.
21 March 1995	27 May 1995	Sede vacante	
27 May 1995	26 October 2001	Peter David Smith	Appointed bishop on 21 March 1995 and consecrated on 27 May 1995. Translated to the archbishopric of Cardiff on 26 October 2001.
26 October 2001	19 March 2003	Sede vacante	
19 March 2003	11 July 2011	Michael Charles Evans	Appointed Bishop of East Anglia on 14 February 2003 and consecrated on 19 March 2003. Died in office on 11 July 2011.
11 July 2011	16 July 2013	Sede vacante	
16 July 2013	11 October 2022	Alan Hopes	Formerly an auxiliary bishop of Westminster (2003–2013). Appointed Bishop of East Anglia on 11 June 2013 and installed on 16 July 2013. Resignation accepted on 11 October 2022
11 October 2022	14 December 2022	Sede vacante	
14 December 2022		Peter Collins	Formerly a Canon of Cardiff. Appointed Bishop of East Anglia on 11 October 2022 and installed on 14 December 2022.
