= Alan Hopes =

British Catholic bishop

The Right Reverend Alan Hopes
- Bishop Emeritus of East Anglia
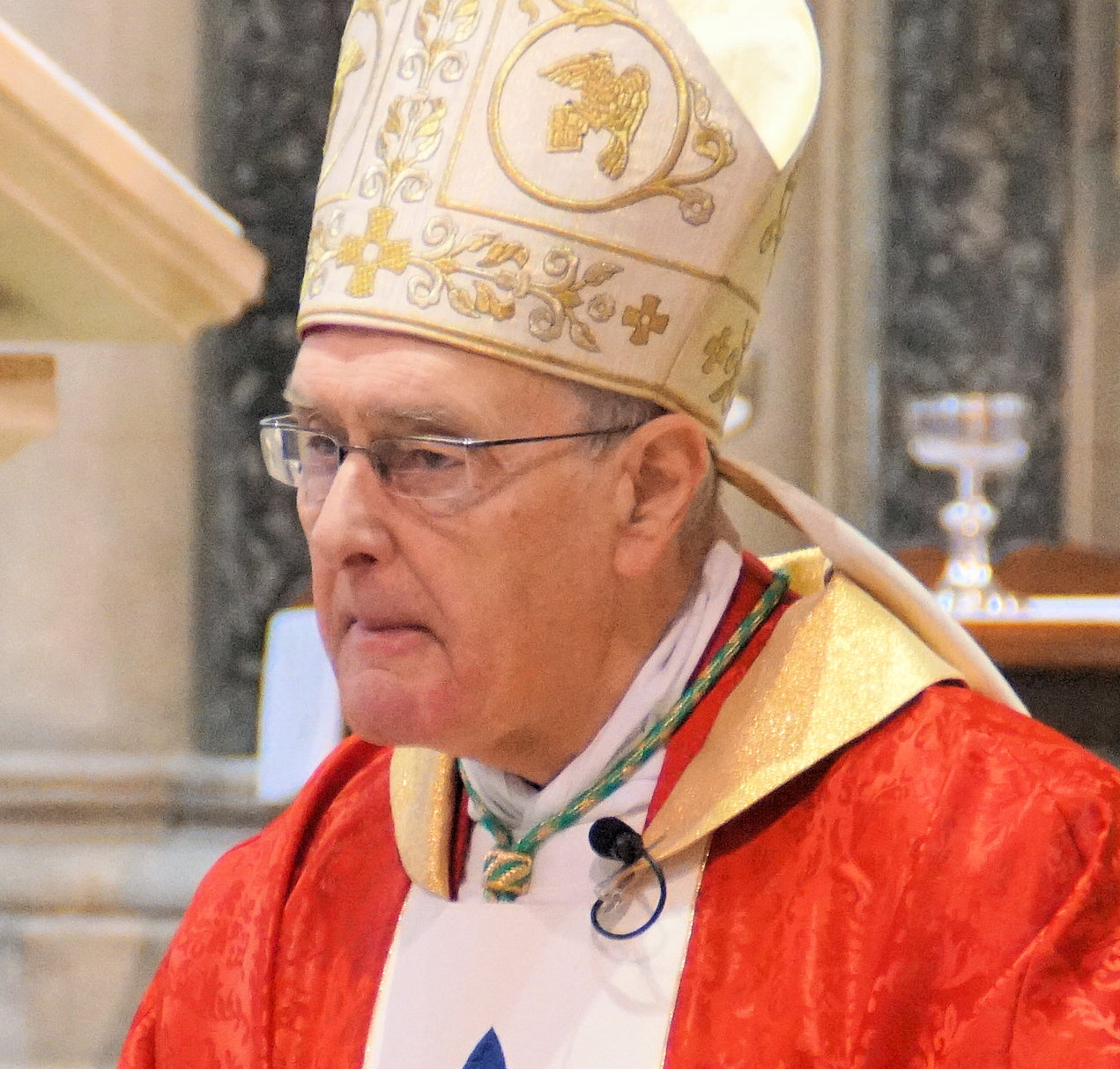
- Hopes in 2019
- Church: Roman Catholic Church
- Province: Westminster
- Diocese: East Anglia
- See: East Anglia
- Appointed: 11 June 2013
- Installed: 16 July 2013
- Term ended: 11 October 2022
- Predecessor: Michael Charles Evans
- Successor: Peter Collins
- Previous posts: Titular Bishop of Cuncacestre (2003-2013); Auxiliary Bishop of Westminster (2003-2013)

Orders
- Ordination: 1968 (Anglican priest); 4 December 1995 (Catholic priest) by Basil Hume
- Consecration: 24 January 2003 by Cormac Murphy-O'Connor

Personal details
- Born: Alan Stephen Hopes; 17 March 1944 (age 82) Oxford, England
- Denomination: Roman Catholicism
- Education: King's College London
- Motto: voluntas sua pax nostra
- Coat of arms: Alan Hopes's coat of arms

Ordination history of Alan Hopes
History
Priestly ordination
- Date: 4 December 1995
Episcopal consecration
- Principal consecrator: Cormac Murphy-O'Connor
- Co-consecrators: Arthur Roche, Kieran Conry
- Date: 24 January 2003
- Place: Westminster Cathedral
Episcopal succession
Bishops consecrated by Alan Hopes as principal consecrator
- Peter Collins: 14 December 2022

Alan Stephen Hopes (born 17 March 1944) is a British Roman Catholic prelate and former Anglican priest. From 2013 to 2022 he served as the Bishop of East Anglia. He was previously appointed as an auxiliary bishop of Westminster in 2003.

== Early life and education ==
Hopes was born in Oxford, England, on 17 March 1944. He was educated at Oxford High School until he moved to London in 1956, when he attended Enfield Grammar School. In 1963 he began a degree in theology at King's College London, graduating in 1966. He then attended Warminster Theological College, an Anglican theological college to train for ministry in the Church of England.

== Anglican ministry ==
Hopes was ordained as an Anglican priest in 1968. As a priest in the Church of England he was vicar of St Paul's Church, Tottenham, from 1978 to 1994.

== Roman Catholic ministry ==
=== Priesthood ===
In 1994, he was received into the Roman Catholic Church. He was ordained a Roman Catholic priest on 4 December 1995. For three years he served as assistant priest at Our Lady of Victories in Kensington, London, before becoming parish priest of the Holy Redeemer and St Thomas More Parish, Chelsea.

In 2001, Hopes was appointed vicar general of the Archdiocese of Westminster and in 2002 became a member of the Committee for Liturgy and Worship of the Catholic Bishops' Conference of England and Wales.

=== Episcopate ===
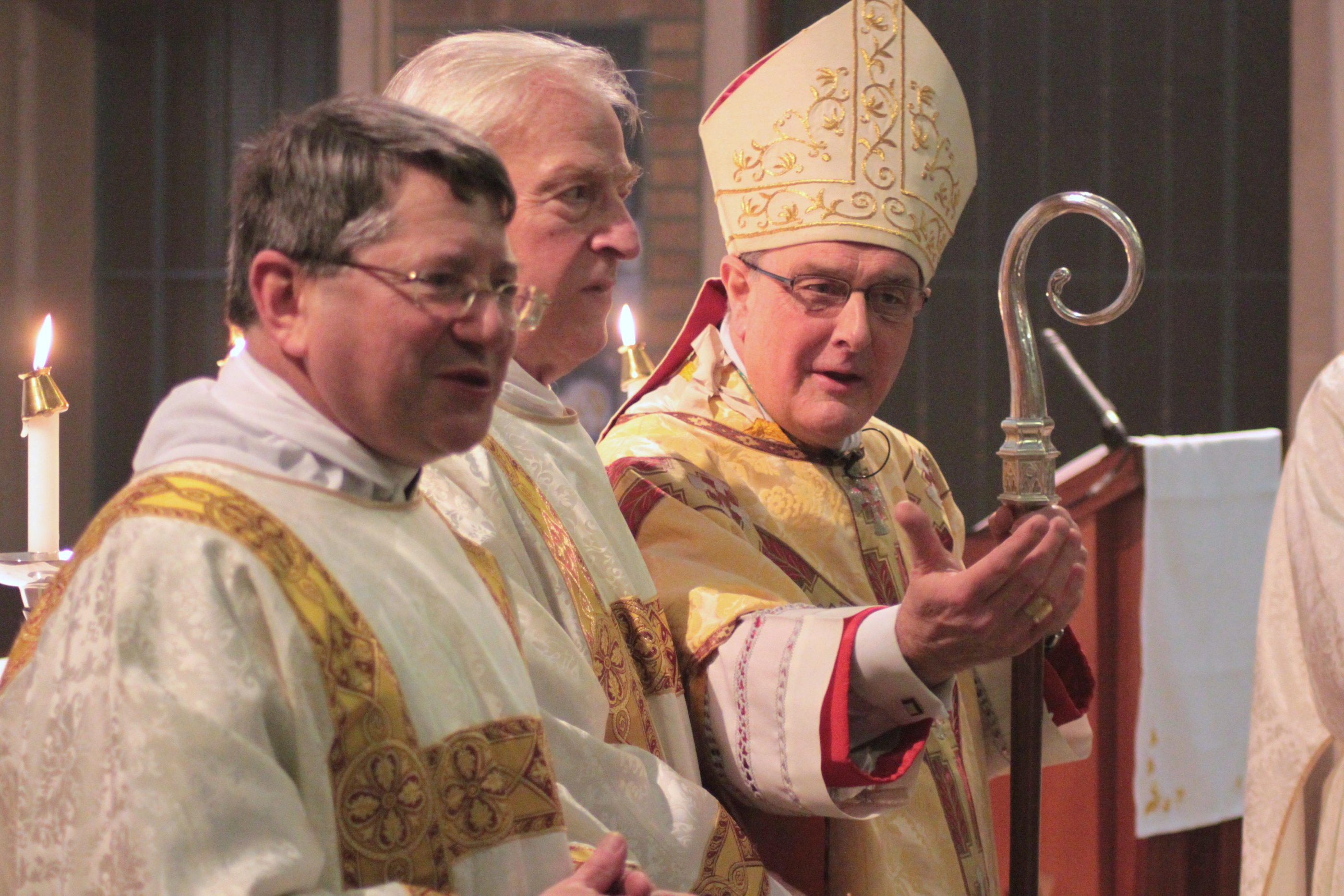
Hopes at the ordination of former Anglican bishops to the Catholic diaconate in 2011

On 4 January 2003, Pope John Paul II appointed him titular bishop of Cuncacestre and an auxiliary bishop of Westminster, making him one of the most senior members of Catholic clergy to have converted in the 1990s. On 24 January 2003 he received episcopal consecration, along with the now Archbishop Bernard Longley, in Westminster Cathedral from Cardinal Cormac Murphy-O'Connor. The principal co-consecrating bishops were Bishop Arthur Roche of Leeds and Bishop Kieran Conry of Arundel and Brighton. As an auxiliary bishop, Hopes had particular pastoral oversight of the deaneries of West London.

In October 2010, Hopes was appointed episcopal delegate of the Catholic Bishops' Conference of England and Wales for the implementation of the apostolic constitution Anglicanorum coetibus.

On 11 June 2013, Pope Francis appointed Hopes the fourth Bishop of East Anglia and he was installed on 16 July 2013 at St John the Baptist Cathedral, Norwich.

He served as Chairman of the English Bishops' Liturgy Committee, and on 28 October 2016 he was appointed by Pope Francis a member of the Congregation for Divine Worship and the Discipline of the Sacraments.

Hopes submitted his resignation as required upon turning 75 and Pope Francis accepted his resignation on 11 October 2022. He remained as apostolic administrator of the diocese until the installation of his successor on 14 December 2022.

Catholic Church titles
Preceded by Michael Charles Evans	Bishop of East Anglia; 2013 – 2022	Succeeded by Peter Collins
Preceded by Owen Francis Swindlehurst	Titular Bishop of Cuncacestre; 2003 – 2013	Succeeded by Robert Byrne
