= St Mary's Church, Chislehurst =

Catholic church in south-east London

St Mary's Church
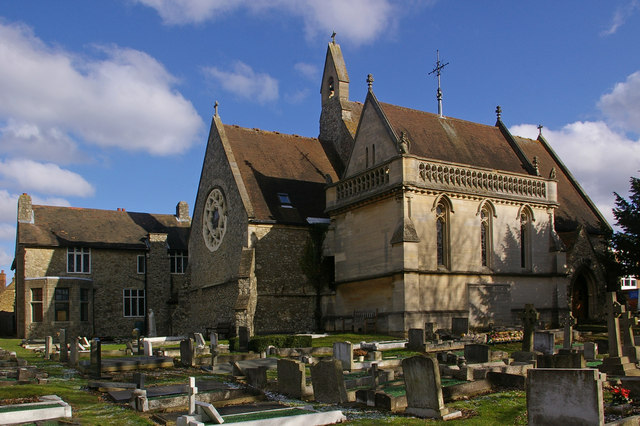
- St Mary's Church
- 51.4077°N 0.0722°E
- OS grid reference: TQ 44222 69671
- Location: Chislehurst
- Country: England
- Denomination: Catholic
- Website: Official website

History
- Status: Parish church
- Founder: Henry Bowden
- Dedication: Saint Mary
- Consecrated: 23 April 1943

Architecture
- Functional status: Active
- Heritage designation: Grade II listed
- Designated: 29 June 1973
- Architect: William Wardell
- Style: Gothic Revival
- Groundbreaking: 8 December 1853
- Completed: 8 August 1854

Administration
- Province: Southwark
- Archdiocese: Southwark
- Deanery: Bromley
- Parish: St Mary's

St Mary's Church is a Roman Catholic parish church in Chislehurst, the Borough of Bromley, London. It was built from 1853 to 1854, and was designed by William Wardell. Wardell, a friend of the architect Augustus Pugin, built the church in a similar Gothic Revival style. It is located on the corner of Crown Lane and Hawkwood Lane to the south of Chislehurst. The church is a Grade II listed building.

In 1874, the church was expanded. A chapel, designed by Henry Clutton was added to the church. It was built to house the tomb of Napoleon III, who died the previous year, spending his last years in exile in nearby Camden Place. In 1879, Napoleon's son, Louis-Napoléon, Prince Imperial, or Napoleon IV, also died and was also buried in the church. In 1888, their tombs were moved to Farnborough Abbey. Around the church is a graveyard, dating to 1864, and contains the tomb of Charles West, the founder of Great Ormond Street Hospital.

== History ==
=== Construction ===
St Mary's Church was founded by Captain Henry Bowden. He was in the Scots Guards. A convert to Catholicism, he hosted the celebration of Mass in his home, Tudor Hall, in Chislehurst. He donated the field opposite his house, upon which the church is located. He also paid for the construction of the church.

On 8 December 1853, the foundation stone of the church was laid by the Bishop of Southwark, Thomas Grant. The architect was William Wardell. A noted student of Augustus Pugin, he designed many churches in London before returning to Australia, such as the Our Ladye Star of the Sea Church in Greenwich, where he incorporated many parts designed by Pugin into the church. On 8 August 1854, Bishop Grant returned to open the church, after nine months of construction. St Mary's was registered for the solemnisation of marriages on 27 August 1855, and was consecrated on 23 April 1943 by Archbishop Peter Amigo.

=== Bonaparte family ===
On 20 March 1871, the exiled Napoleon III, his wife Eugénie de Montijo, son Louis-Napoléon and household arrived in Chislehurst. They stayed at the nearby Camden Place. It became the last home of the family. Two years later, on 9 January 1873, Napoleon III died. Six days later, he was buried in St Mary's. His funeral was presided over by Bishop James Danell. The next year, in 1874, the church was expanded with a chapel built for the tomb of Napoleon III. It was designed by Henry Clutton, who took inspiration from the chapel in Château d'Amboise. In 1879, Louis-Napoléon, also called the Prince Imperial, was killed in the Anglo-Zulu War. His body was returned to Chislehurst and his funeral took place at the church; 10,000 people came to the church to mourn. Queen Victoria was present and Cardinal Manning preached. Louis-Napoléon was laid beside his father in the same chapel. Within a couple of years, Empress Eugénie wanted a larger mausoleum for her family, so she founded St Michael's Abbey in Farnborough. In 1888, the tombs were moved to the abbey, but the chapel in Chislehurst remains. A memorial is there for the prince and Napoleon III.

=== Developments ===
Further additions were made to St Mary's in the following decades. From 1892 to 1914, stained-glass windows were added, two made in Paris and six by Hardman & Co., as well as an organ gallery, six statues, and an altar rail. The Stations of the Cross were replaced, and the main altar and reredos were renovated. In the 1920s, the family of Frank Cyril Tiarks paid for many renovations of the church. The heating and electricity system were installed as was a new organ and newer stations of the cross. After 1965, the altar was moved away from the wall, and the altar rail was removed. The pulpit was lowered and the chancel was heightened. From 1981 to 1986, repair work was done to the outside of the building. Afterwards, four stained-glass windows from Dunstable Priory were installed in the church. In 2023, the Royal Historical Society commemorated the history of Chislehurst on the 150th anniversary of the arrival of Napoleon III by hosting events named "150 years of Imperial Chislehurst".

== Parish ==
St Mary's has its own parish and is in a deanery with the other Catholic churches in the Borough of Bromley. It has two Sunday Masses, one in English at 9:30 am and one Traditional Latin Mass at 11:00 am.

== Exterior ==
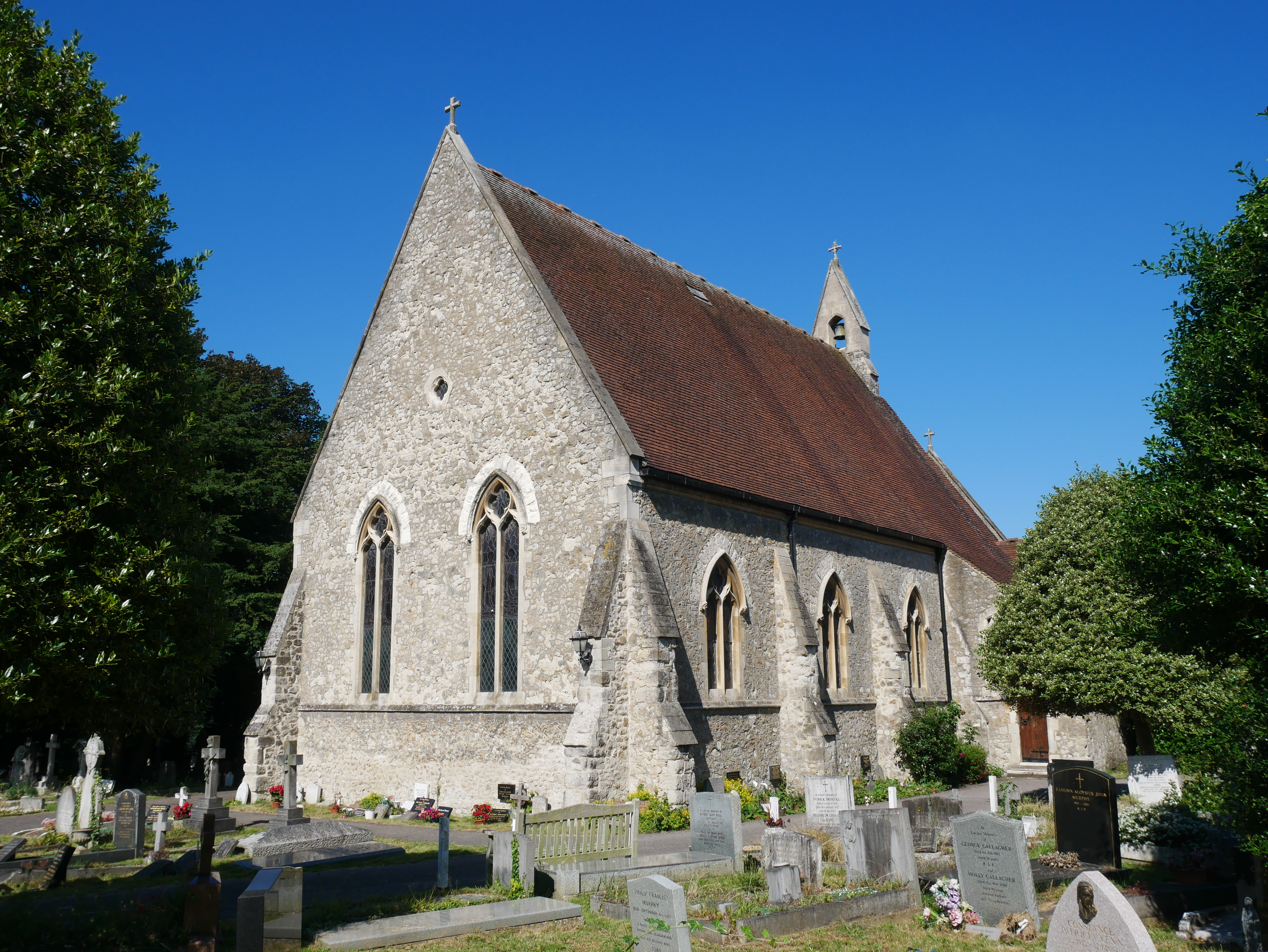
East view

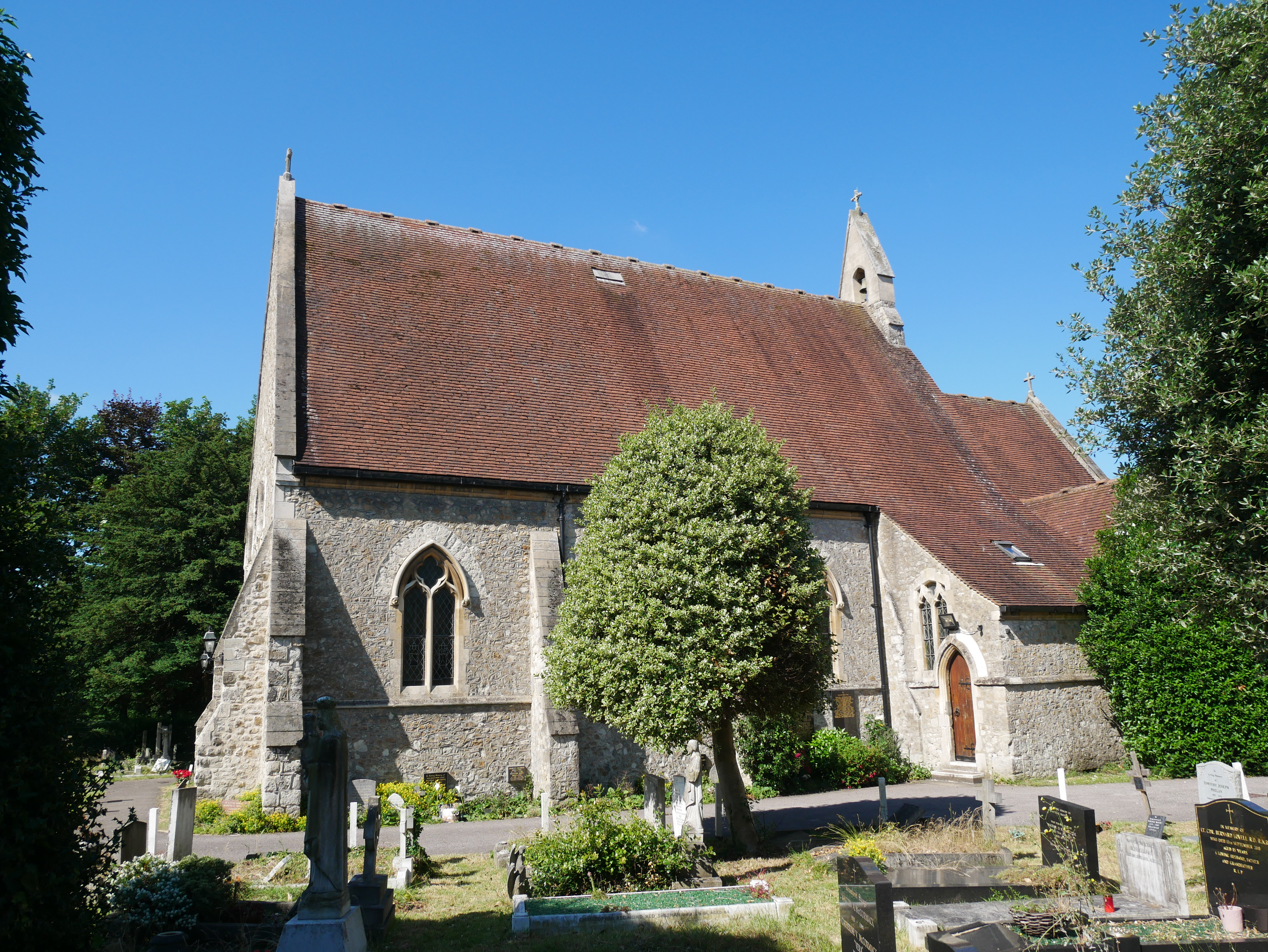
Northeast face

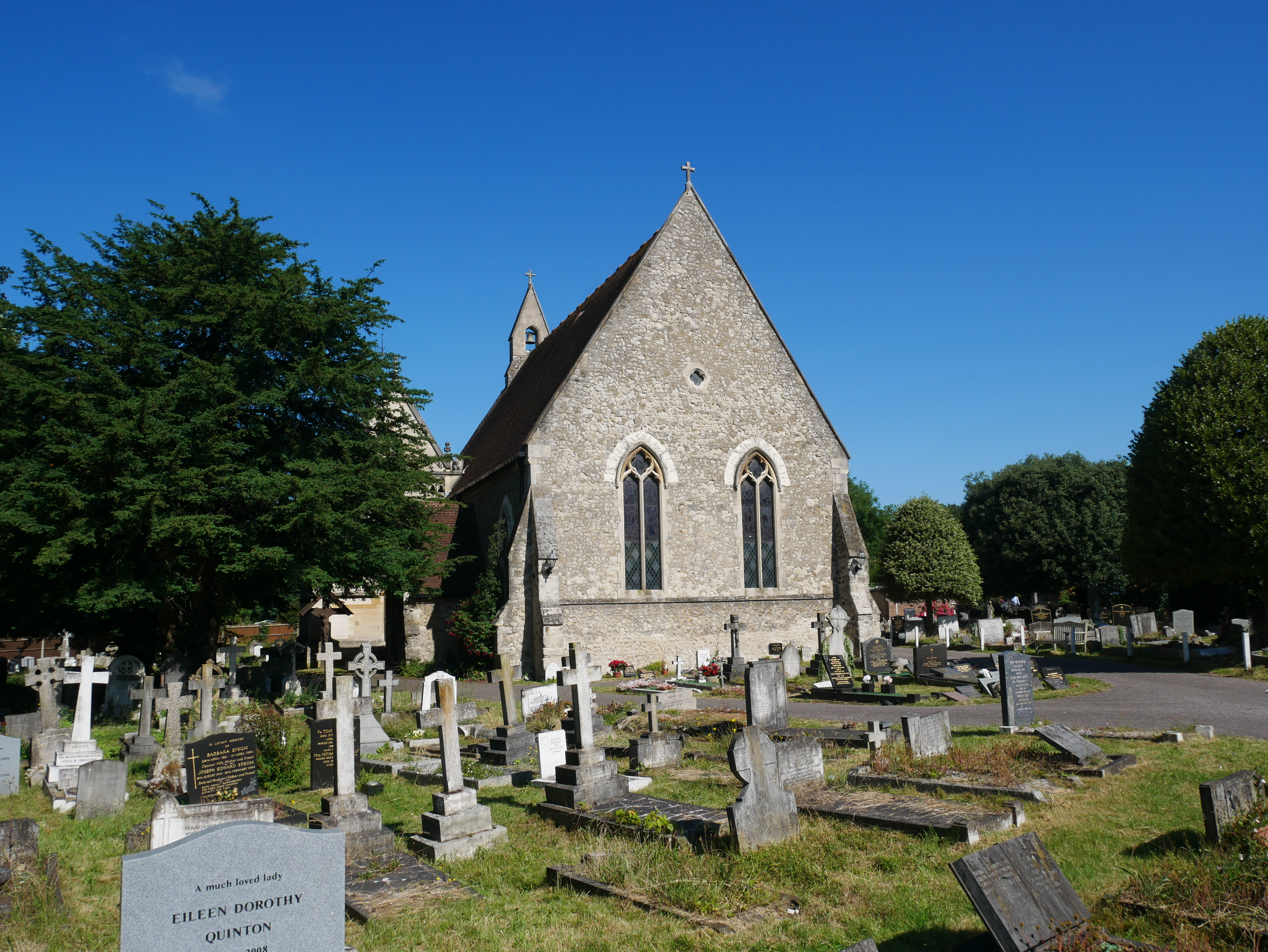
Southeast face

== See also ==
- Archdiocese of Southwark
