= Our Lady Help of Christians Church, Blackheath =

Coordinates: 51.465°N 0.0107°E

Our Lady Help of Christians Church
- St Mary's Church
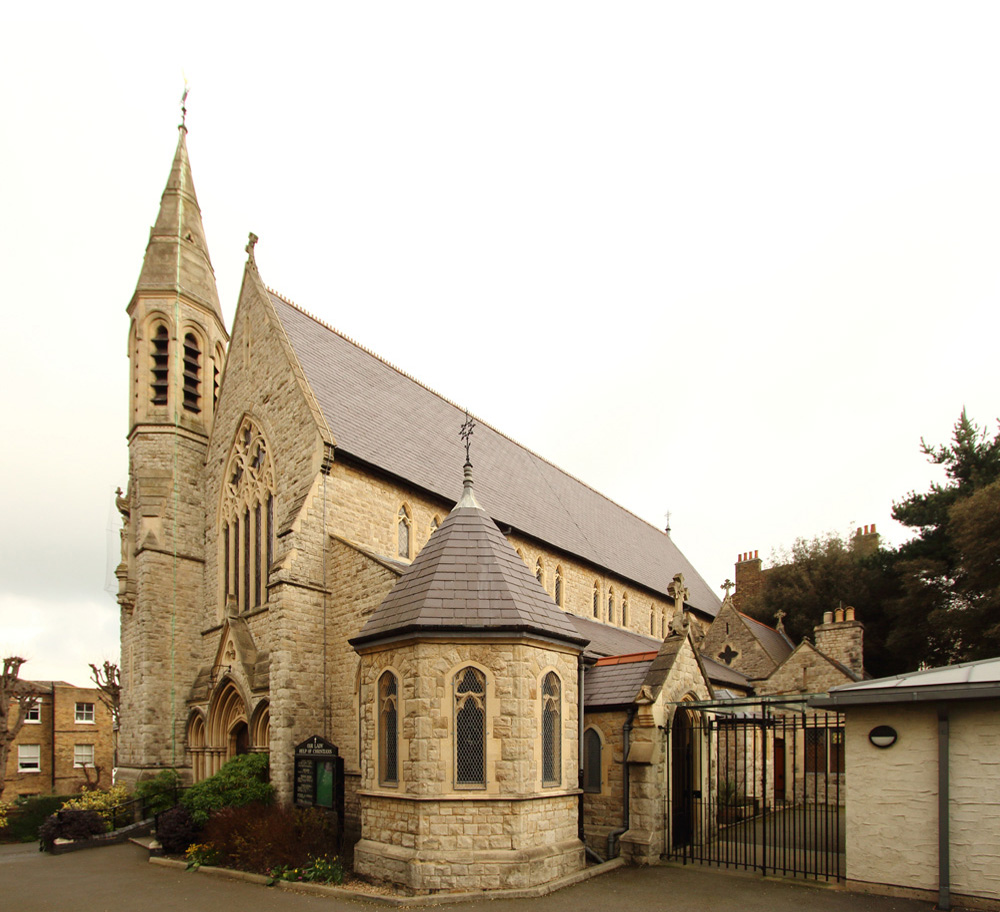
- Our Lady Help of Christians Church
- OS grid reference: TQ 39770 75922
- Location: Blackheath
- Country: England
- Denomination: Catholic
- Website: StMarysBlackheath.org.uk

History
- Status: Parish church
- Founder(s): William Gowan Todd; Charles Butler
- Dedication: Our Lady Help of Christians
- Consecrated: 3 September 1906

Architecture
- Functional status: Active
- Heritage designation: Grade II listed
- Designated: 8 June 1973
- Architect: Alfred Edward Purdie
- Style: Gothic Revival
- Groundbreaking: 1890
- Completed: 1 July 1891
- Construction cost: £4,147

Administration
- Province: Southwark
- Archdiocese: Southwark
- Deanery: Greenwich
- Parish: Blackheath

Our Lady Help of Christians Church also known as St Mary's Church is a Catholic parish church in Blackheath, Borough of Greenwich, London. It was built from 1890 to 1891 and designed by the Alfred Edward Purdie, in the Gothic Revival style. It is located on Cresswell Park, just off Lee Road, close to Blackheath station. It is a Grade II listed building.

== History ==
=== Foundation ===
In 1870, Rev Dr William Gowan Todd moved to Blackheath. He started a Catholic orphanage in Park House on the Cator Estate in Blackheath. Originally, the orphanage was in Greenwich, near Our Ladye Star of the Sea Church. However, the orphanage had to move to make way for a convent. In Blackheath, Todd had a chapel built, where St Mary's Hall is now. Originally, the chapel was just for the use of the orphanage. However, local Catholics started to attend Mass there (preferring it over travelling to Our Ladye Star of the Sea in Greenwich) and Todd soon received permission for it to be a chapel for the area. In 1873, the chapel formally became the site of the mission in Blackheath.

=== Construction ===
In 1888, the priest at the mission was Fr Francis J. Sheehan. He worked on the building of a new larger church. Charles Butler and his family funded the building of the church and the leasing and purchase of the land from the Cator Estate. Originally, the church was built on land that was leased. However, the Butlers endowed the church with funds so that the land could be bought by the church when it became available. In 1890, construction work started on the church. The architect was Alfred Edward Purdie, who was a student of Augustus Pugin and assistant to Gilbert R. Blount. On 1 July 1891, the church was opened by the Bishop of Southwark John Butt. The cost of constructing the church came to £4,147. However, more additions were made to the church. In 1894, the side altars were finished and then consecrated again by the bishop. Until 1900, stained glass windows were installed. Stained glass in every window was added, and they were all made by Hardman & Co. as John Hardman Powell, who managed the company, and was its chief designer, lived nearby at 12 Lee Road. On 3 September 1906, the church was consecrated by Bishop Peter Amigo. In 1913, Catherine Butler, gave the church a £10,000 endowment. The orphanage chapel became St Mary's Hall, the parish hall, but it was destroyed during the Second World War, and was rebuilt and reopened in 1955.

== Parish ==
Near to the church is St Matthew Academy, it is the amalgamation of St Joseph's Academy, Blackheath and Our Lady of Lourdes Primary School. In 1919, the De La Salle Brothers moved St Joseph's Academy to Blackheath from Clapham. In 1922, the Sisters of the Sacred Hearts of Jesus and Mary came to Blackheath and founded two schools, St Theresa's Secondary School (closed in 1992) and Our Lady of Lourdes Primary School. In 2007, St Matthew Academy was formed from what was Our Lady of Lourdes and St Joseph schools. The church has four Sunday Masses at 6.30 pm on Saturday and at 9:30 am, 11:00 am and at 5:00 pm on Sunday.

== See also ==
- Archdiocese of Southwark
