= Robert Coffin =

Robert Coffin may refer to:

- Robert P. T. Coffin (1892–1955), American writer, poet and professor
- Robert Coffin (bishop) (1819–1885), Catholic bishop
- Bob Coffin (born 1942), American politician
