= Bishop of Southwark =

Bishop of Southwark may refer to:

- Anglican Bishop of Southwark, the Ordinary of the Church of England Diocese of Southwark
- Archbishop of Southwark, the Ordinary of the Roman Catholic Archdiocese of Southwark
