= St John's Seminary, Wonersh =

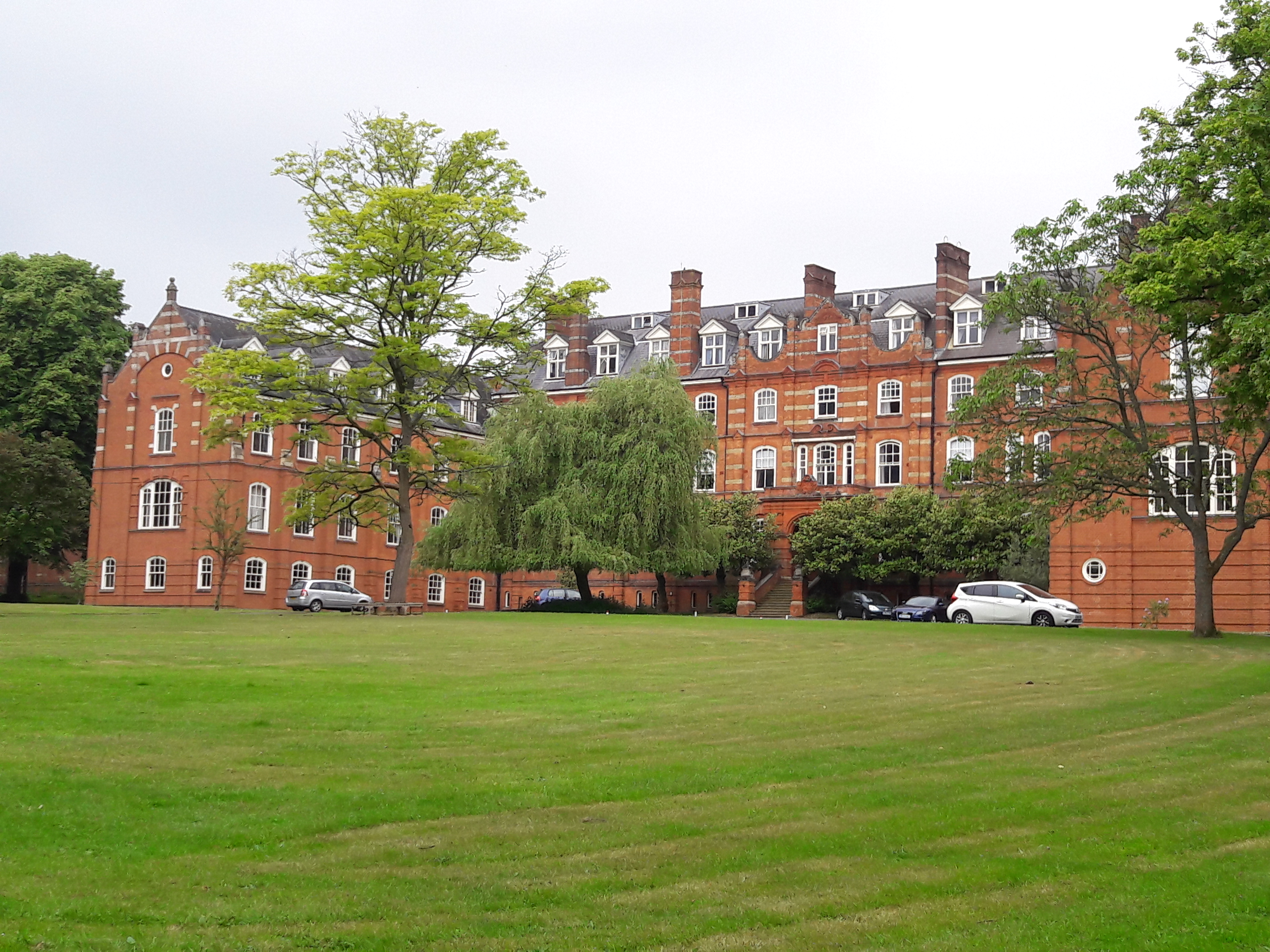
- Front of building

- Location of St. John's Seminary in Surrey, UK
- 51°11′45″N 0°32′7″W
- OS grid reference: TQ 02465 45073
- Location: Wonersh, Surrey
- Country: England
- Denomination: Roman Catholic

History
- Status: Seminary
- Founded: 1889; 137 years ago
- Founder: Bishop John Butt
- Dedication: Sacred Heart
- Consecrated: 1896

Architecture
- Functional status: Inactive
- Architect: Frederick Walters
- Style: Dutch Jacobean
- Groundbreaking: 1889
- Completed: 8 September 1891
- Closed: 3 July 2021

Listed Building – Grade II
- Official name: St John's Seminary
- Designated: 28 October 1986
- Reference no.: 1241162

Administration
- Province: Southwark
- Diocese: Arundel and Brighton
- Deanery: Guildford
- Parish: St. Thomas More, Bramley

Clergy
- Bishop: Rt Rev Richard Moth
- Rector: Mgr Gerald Ewing

St John's Seminary was a Roman Catholic seminary established in 1891 and located at Wonersh near Guildford in Surrey, in the Diocese of Arundel and Brighton, United Kingdom. St John's was the principal seminary for that diocese and also for the Archdiocese of Southwark, and for other dioceses to a greater or lesser extent, including Plymouth, Portsmouth, East Anglia, Clifton, Menevia, and also for the Archdiocese of Cardiff and the newly-founded Ordinariate of Our Lady of Walsingham.

In late 2020 it was announced that the seminary would close. The seminary was in continuous use until the building was officially vacated in December 2022 after all sacred objects and articles had been removed and re-homed in Catholic churches and institutions in the UK and beyond.

The seminary served mainly the dioceses of the South of England; it also provided formation for students from dioceses further afield and for members of religious institutes. From 1985 it offered courses in theology for lay (external) students. These courses ran alongside the academic programme offered to students in formation. This programme was validated by St Mary's University, Twickenham, of which the seminary was an Associated Institution. The seminary was also a resource for local Church activities, and provided a venue for various groups including the formation programme for the Permanent Diaconate, as well as a centre of expertise in the work of formation and sacred science.

The seminary occupied a building listed Grade II on the National Heritage List for England.

== History ==
=== Foundation ===
St John's Seminary was established in 1891 as the diocesan seminary for the then Diocese of Southwark by Bishop John Baptist Butt. He desired to found a college along entirely different, continental, lines, in distinction to the more Jesuit-inspired tradition of the English seminaries to date. He employed as his first rector the young priest Francis Bourne, later to become Cardinal Archbishop of Westminster, who had studied at the great seminary of St Sulpice in Paris and had also known St John Bosco. The project began almost immediately; a site was purchased at Lostiford, a hamlet outside the village of Wonersh near Guildford, and during the two years that the seminary was under construction, the community began in Henfield Place, a large house (still standing) in Henfield, Sussex.

Butt was determined that his foundation be entirely new. Therefore, those men already studying for the Southwark Diocese were left in their current seminaries, and only new entrants were taken for the new St John's Seminary, some boys as young as twelve. These were to complete their studies in the humanities at St John's before proceeding to the study of Philosophy and Theology at about the age of 17 or 18. In September 1891, the buildings at Wonersh were sufficiently complete for them to house the new community, though the chapel was not to follow until 1896. In 1893 there were enough young men ready to begin studies in Philosophy and Theology, and so from this period St John's housed both a minor and a major seminary.

=== Early days ===
In 1896, Francis Bourne was made Coadjutor Bishop of Southwark only a few weeks after his 35th birthday, and not long afterwards succeeded to the see when Bishop John Baptist Butt retired. As Rector of Wonersh Bourne was succeeded by George Barrett. However, the latter suffered from ill-health and resigned in 1901, to be succeeded by the nephew of the founder, and later Auxiliary Bishop in Westminster, Joseph Butt.

This was a turbulent time for the Seminary, as for the Church. Modernism had begun to appear, and received a certain amount of support from some of the lecturers and students. Bourne, while bishop, was inclined to be mildly tolerant of this, but his successor, Peter Amigo, was not. Amigo had succeeded in 1903, when Bourne was unexpectedly appointed Archbishop of Westminster. Amigo removed several of the lecturers inclined towards Modernism, and his instinct in this was later confirmed by Pope Pius X's encyclicals Pascendi and Lamentabili, which condemned Modernism in no uncertain terms.

Joseph Butt left Wonersh in 1907, to be succeeded as rector by Arthur Doubleday, later Bishop of Brentwood. Bourne had wanted Thomas Hooley, the 'regent' (or superior of the junior seminarians) as Butt's successor, and the resulting disagreement between Bourne and Amigo lead to a permanent cooling of relations between the two. Amigo was well aware of his canonical authority over Wonersh, which was the seminary of his diocese, and that Bourne, despite his personal history, had no formal role in its regard. As for Doubleday, he proved to be endowed with a strong character, which he drew upon to steer the seminary through the difficulties of the First World War. This was a period when many of the junior seminarians were called up after 1916, some being sent to the front. As a consequence, the seminary slowly emptied, with only those seminarians remaining who as regards military service were too old, too young or in some way incapacitated.

=== Mid 20th century ===
After the war, the seminary recovered well. In 1924, it was becoming so full that the decision was made to establish a new junior seminary, which became St Joseph's College, Mark Cross near Crowborough in Sussex, making St John's exclusively a major seminary, which it has remained ever since. In the same year, Monsignor Philip Hallett became rector, the longest serving and arguably one of the most successful in the seminary's history.

The Second World War was not so devastating for Wonersh as the First. No students were called up, but were able instead to 'do their bit' locally, participating in various civil defence operations, including operating a local fire service.

Following the war, the entry of large numbers of demobbed servicemen into the seminary gave rise inevitably to disciplinary problems, which were resolved in the 1950s by the stern government of Mgr Bernard Wall, later to be Bishop of Brentwood.

=== Post-conciliar ===
Though St John's had always been considered the strictest of the English seminaries, the aftermath of the Second Vatican Council brought considerable relaxation, with a less cloistered life and more direct pastoral experiences for seminarians during their studies. On an academic front, arrangements with English universities were developed, first Southampton, then Surrey, and then St Mary's Twickenham. These enabled the seminarians to qualify for a secular academic degree.

St John's accepted students from several dioceses in England and Wales and from Scotland.

Changed circumstances, especially a continued decline in the numbers of those seeking to study for the priesthood, meant that the future of Wonersh was subject to periodical review after the turn of the millennium, especially after the closure of the seminary of St Cuthbert's College, Ushaw.

=== Closure ===
The decision to close St John's was announced in October 2020, after the intake for the beginning of that academic year had dropped to zero. No firm indications as to the future of the complex were given in the press release announcing the closure.

The closure was celebrated in the presence of Most Rev John Wilson, Archbishop of Southwark, the Chair of Trustees and the Rt Rev Richard Moth, Bishop of Arundel & Brighton, and Vice-Chair of Trustees. The day was also the celebration of the ordination as deacons of five of the seminarians.

== Senior staff ==
At the time of closure, the senior staff were

- Rector, Monsignor Gerald Ewing
- Director of Spirituality, Canon Luke Smith
- Director of Human Formation, Rev. David Barrett
- Director of Studies, Dr. Pia Matthews
- Director of Pastoral Theology, Rev. Kevin Dring
- Formation Tutor/House Liturgist, Rev. Julian Shurgold

== Notable former students ==
- Richard Moth (born 1958), Bishop of Arundel and Brighton (2015–2025), Archbishop of Westminster (2026–)

== Motto ==
The motto spes messis in semine (the hope of the harvest is in the seed), referred to the confidence in the work done at the Seminary for the future of the Church and the Kingdom of God.
