= Francis Bourne =

English Catholic cardinal (1861–1935)

His Eminence Francis Bourne
- Cardinal, Archbishop of Westminster
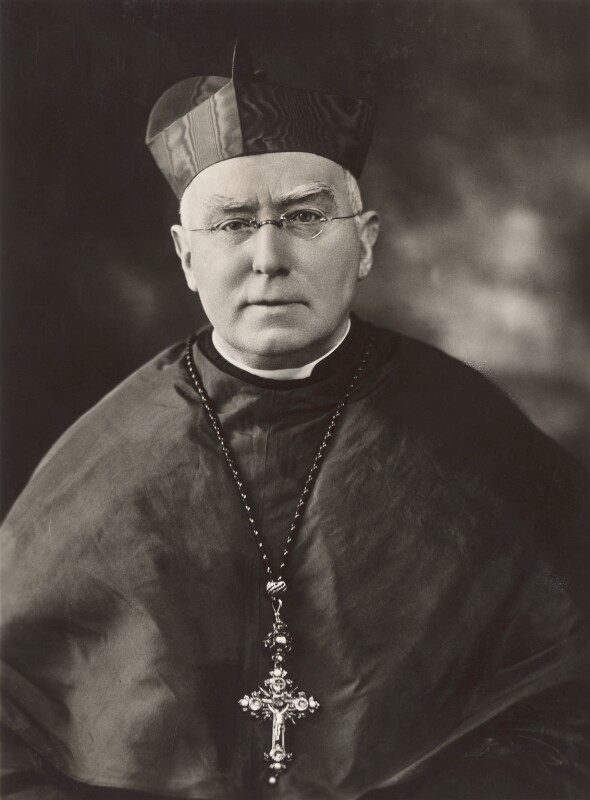
- Bourne in 1931
- Province: Westminster
- Diocese: Westminster
- Appointed: 11 September 1903
- Term ended: 1 January 1935
- Predecessor: Herbert Vaughan
- Successor: Arthur Hinsley
- Other post: Cardinal-Priest of Santa Pudenziana
- Previous posts: Coadjutor Bishop of Southwark (1896-1897); Titular Bishop of Epiphania in Cilicia (1896-1897); Bishop of Southwark (1897-1903)

Orders
- Ordination: 11 June 1884 by Robert Coffin
- Consecration: 1 May 1896 by Herbert Vaughan
- Created cardinal: 27 November 1911 by Pius X
- Rank: Cardinal-Priest

Personal details
- Born: Francis Alphonsus Bourne; 23 March 1861 Clapham, Surrey, England
- Died: 1 January 1935 (aged 73) London, England
- Buried: St. Edmund's College, Ware, Hertfordshire, England
- Denomination: Roman Catholic
- Coat of arms

Styles of Francis Bourne
- Reference style: His Eminence
- Spoken style: Your Eminence
- Religious style: (autofilled)
- Informal style: Cardinal

Francis Alphonsus Bourne (23 March 1861 – 1 January 1935) was an English prelate of the Catholic Church. He served as the fourth Archbishop of Westminster from 1903 until his death, and was elevated to the cardinalate in 1911.

== Biography ==
=== Early life ===
Francis Bourne was born in Clapham to Henry and Ellen Byrne Bourne on 23 March 1861. His father, a civil servant was a convert and his mother, an Irish Catholic. Bourne entered St. Cuthbert College at Ushaw Moor, County Durham in 1867 and then upon the death of his older brother in 1877, it was decided that Francis should move to St. Edmund's College in Ware, which was considered a better location for someone of his delicate health. It was while at St. Edmund's that he decided to become a priest. He joined the Order of Friars Preachers, more commonly known as the Dominicans, in Woodchester but left in 1880. From 1880 to 1881 he attended St. Thomas' Seminary in Hammersmith to study philosophy, and then went to study in France at Saint-Sulpice Seminary in Paris and the University of Leuven. While in Paris, he met Don Bosco, and considered joining Bosco's Salesian Order.

He was ordained to the priesthood on 11 June 1884 at St. Mary's in Clapham, by Bishop Robert Coffin, the same priest who had baptized him at St. Mary's years before. Bourne then did pastoral work in Blackheath, Mortlake, and West Grinstead until 1889. Bourne was rector of the House of Studies at Henfield Place from 1889 to 1891, at which time he began teaching at St. John's Seminary in Wonersh, of which he became rector on 14 March 1896. He was raised to the rank of Domestic Prelate of His Holiness by Pope Leo XIII in 1895.

On 27 March 1896 Bourne was appointed Coadjutor Bishop of Southwark and Titular Bishop of Epiphania in Cilicia. He received his episcopal consecration on the following 1 May from Cardinal Herbert Vaughan, with Bishops John Baptist Butt and Thomas Whiteside, in St. George's Cathedral. Bourne later succeeded Butt as Bishop of Southwark on 9 April 1897.

=== Archbishop ===
Bourne was named Archbishop of Westminster on 11 September 1903. As Archbishop of Westminster, he became the spiritual head of the Catholic Church in England and Wales. In defiance of the governmental law banning Eucharistic processions, Bourne gave the benediction from the loggia of Westminster Cathedral in 1908. He was created Cardinal-Priest of S. Pudenziana by Pope Pius X in the consistory of 27 November 1911, and was a cardinal elector in the conclaves of 1914 and again in 1922, which selected Popes Benedict XV and Pius XI respectively.

Bourne responded to Ramsay MacDonald's call for an English Catholic prelate's interpretation of Pius XI's encyclical Quadragesimo anno, which forbade Catholics from being socialists, by stating, "There is nothing in the encyclical which should deter Catholics from becoming members of the British Labour Party ...". However, the cardinal continued to warn Catholics to be cautious of the "erroneous principles which sometimes affect parties." In a radio broadcast he strongly condemned the 1926 United Kingdom general strike as an illegitimate challenge to the sovereignty of Parliament and as such to "lawfully constituted authority", which represents "the authority of God himself."

Rather conservative, Bourne was opposed to Modernism, but he was prudent in his handling of the Modernist crisis in England. The leading lay English Catholic intellectual at the time, Baron Friedrich von Hügel, was on the moderate wing of the Modernist movement. Knowing of von Hügel's holiness and fundamental loyalty, Bourne told the Baron's daughter Thekla, "I have never got him into trouble and I never will." Michael de la Bédoyère describes Bourne as "a prelate whose wisdom and statesmanship have never been sufficiently acknowledged".

He was not overly supportive of interfaith dialogue nor of ecumenism (he notably opposed the holding of the Malines Conversations between prominent Anglicans and Catholics). He condemned granting greater freedom to divorce and the use of birth control. He also desired to see the United Kingdom adopt Roman Catholic faith as its official religion.

He died after a year's illness in his archepiscopal residence in London, at age 73. Bourne was buried at his alma mater of St. Edmund's College, Ware, Hertfordshire, in the chapel he established in memory of the college's members who died during World War I, and his heart was placed in the chapel of St. John's Seminary at Wonersh, Surrey, in June 1935.

== See also ==
- Saint Monica's Church, Palmers Green

Catholic Church titles
Preceded by John Baptist Butt	Bishop of Southwark; 1897–1903	Succeeded by Peter Emmanuel Amigo
Preceded by Herbert Vaughan	Archbishop of Westminster; 1903–1935	Succeeded by Arthur Hinsley
Preceded by Victor-Lucien-Sulpice Lécot	Cardinal Priest of Santa Pudenziana; 1911–1935	Succeeded by Luigi Maglione
