= Codex Urbanus =

Parisian street artist

- Born: December 15, 1974; Paris
- Movement: Urban art

Codex Urbanus (born 1974) is a Parisian street artist that has been painting imaginary animals on the walls of Paris since 2011. He is mostly active in Montmartre.

== The Vandal Bestiary ==
Codex Urbanus means “Urban Manuscript” in Latin and was originally the name of the night bestiary the artist was illegally painting on the walls of Montmartre. Each creature is a mix of different existing animals, that can usually be identified by the binomial name in Latin under it. “Codex Urbanus” always appears above it, leading passers-by and fans to call the artist that name.

Codex uses paint markers to work, and his style is inspired by the illuminated manuscripts of the medieval amanuensis, with a nod towards modern day genetics. Influences from Hieronymus Bosch to French cartoon artists such as Joann Sfar are also to be found in his bestiary. He does not look for technical excellence but seeks rather a free expression, a way to convey his dreams straight from his mind to the cement.

Graffiti Fig 574: Chimera Volklingensis by Codex Urbanus on a steel door at the Völklingen Ironworks

To this day, there are over 200 different creatures that have been painted in the streets of Paris and a few other cities.

== Other activities ==
=== Festivals ===
As a French street artist, Codex Urbanus has taken part in different Urban Art festivals, such as Rue des Arts in Aulnay-sous-Bois or In Situ Festival in Aubervilliers in 2014. He has been painting wall at Burning Man each year since 2012.

=== Exhibitions ===
Since his first show in 2013 at the parisian gallery Le Cabinet d'Amateur, Codex Urbanus has shown his work worldwide. In September 2014 he was part of the Dalí Fait le Mur group show at the Espace Dalí in Paris, and he was the only live painter ever invited for a solo show in May 2016 at the French Musée national Gustave Moreau in Paris. He organized a street art show on fans at the Paris Musée de l’éventail in 2015 and in the London Fan Museum in Greenwich in 2017.

== Monograph ==
Codex Urbanus - A Vandal Bestiary. Antoine Téchenet / David Gilchrist, Critères éditions, in the street art collection Opus Délits (French ISBN code : 978-2-37026-019-2).
