= Greenwich Museum =

Greenwich Museum may refer to several museums in London:

- National Maritime Museum
- Greenwich Heritage Centre
- Fan Museum
- Greenwich Visitor Centre
