= Crooms Hill =

Street in Greenwich, London

Coordinates: 51.47702°N 0.00585°W

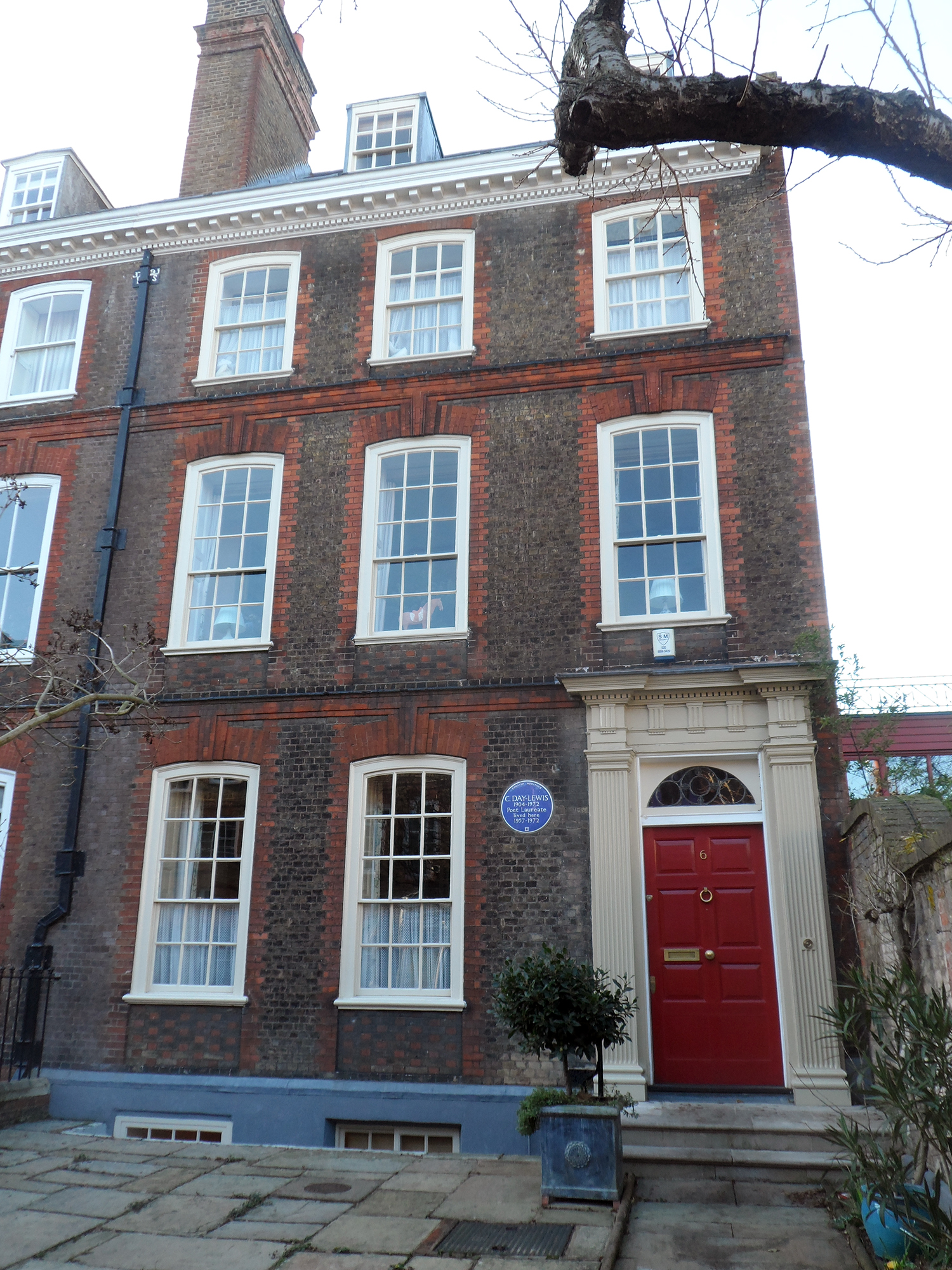
Residence of the poet laureate Cecil Day-Lewis on Crooms Hill

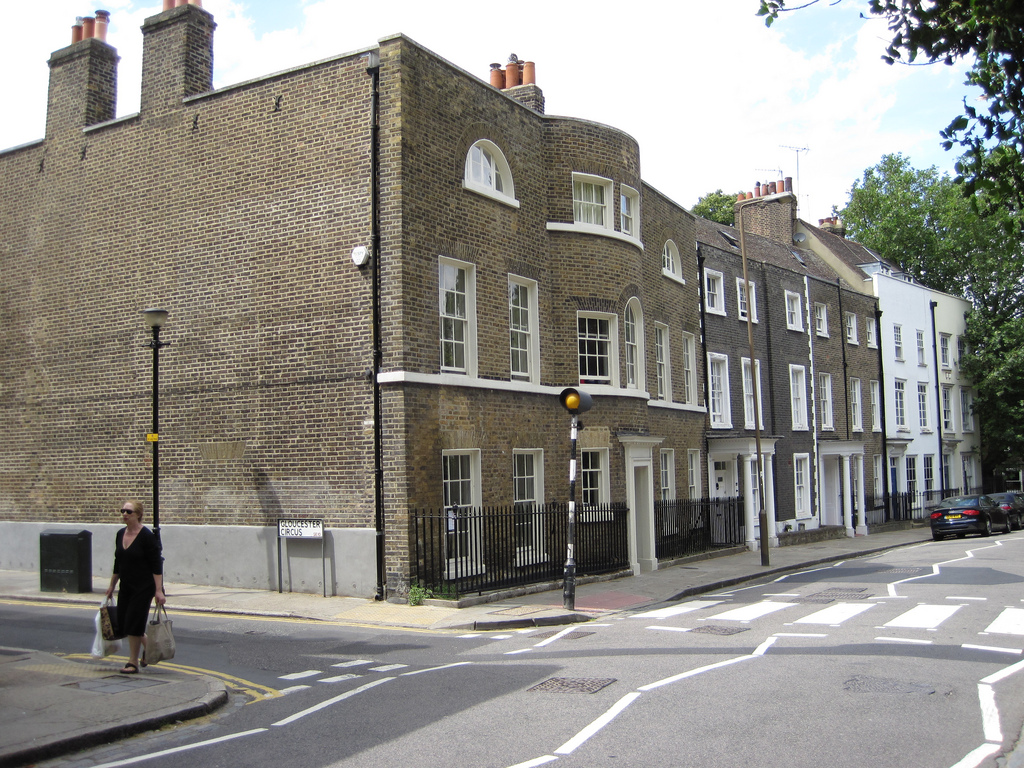
Houses on Crooms Hill northwest of the junction with Gloucester Circus

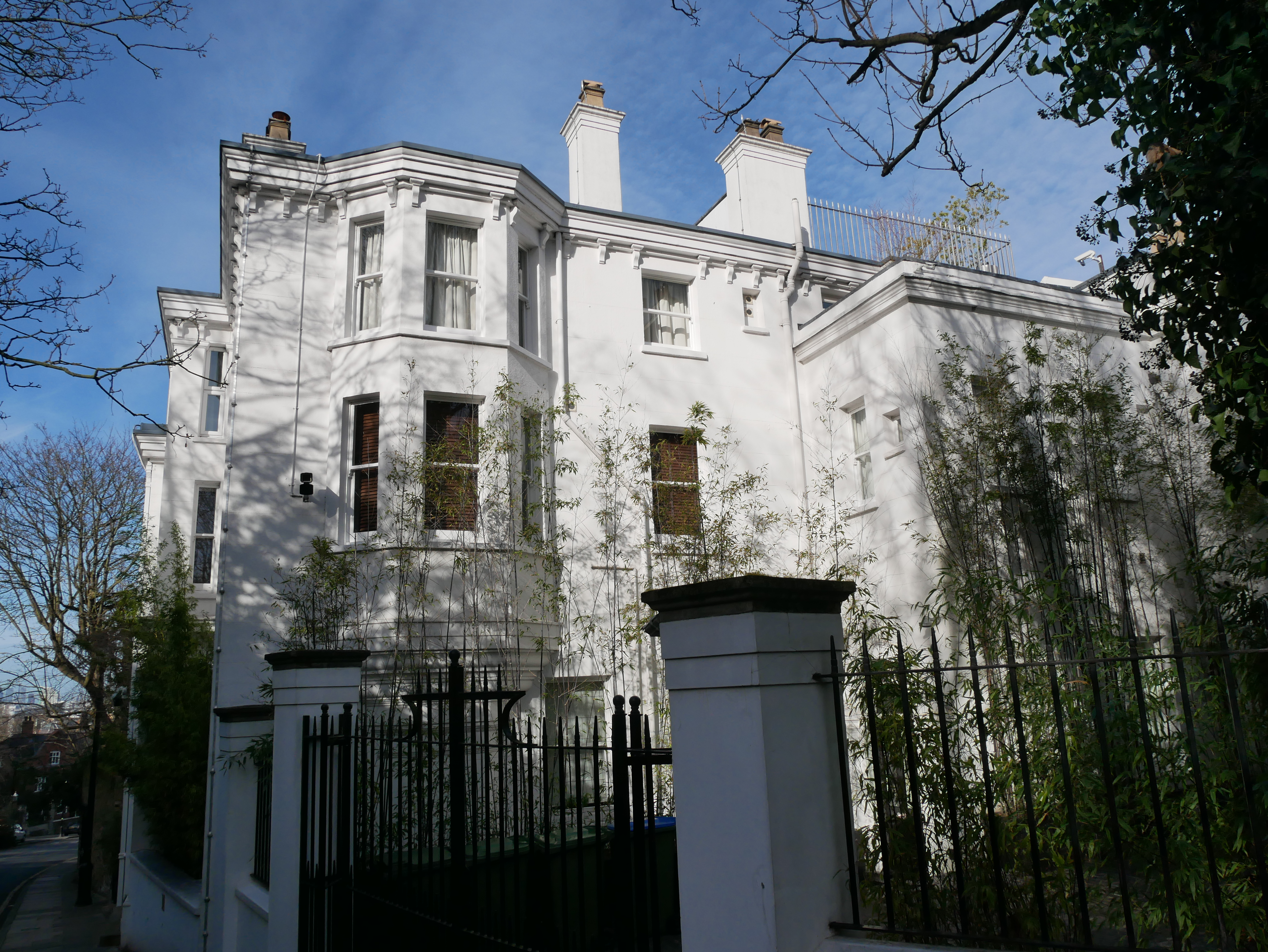
Hillside, one of several homes of Chris Rokos, in 2023

Crooms Hill is a residential street in Greenwich in South East London. The street name has been described as one of the oldest in London, possibly deriving from the Celtic word 'crom', meaning crooked.

It runs uphill in a southerly direction for approximately 1 km (0.6 mi) from central Greenwich along the west side of Greenwich Park to Blackheath where it splits into Cade Road and General Wolfe Road, while Chesterfield Walk branches off towards the Ranger's House. The southern end was formerly called Heathgate Lane, possibly signifying the location of a gate onto the Heath.

At the northern end are Greenwich Theatre and the adjacent Rose and Crown pub at a crossroads that links eastwards to King William Walk (via Nevada Street), northwards to Greenwich High Road (via Stockwell Street) and westwards to Royal Hill (via Burney Street). It is a largely residential street; near central Greenwich, it consists primarily of terraced townhouses; further south are larger individual houses. At the northern end of the road are blue plaques on the former residences of Cecil Day-Lewis and Benjamin Waugh, and the Fan Museum. This end of the street was served by Greenwich Park railway station in nearby Stockwell Street from 1888 to 1917.

The Pevsner Guide describes Crooms Hill as "the pride of domestic architecture in Greenwich". Much of the housing dates from the seventeenth century to the early nineteenth century. Although some Tudor era buildings survive much of the land was developed when Greenwich Park was enclosed in 1619 leaving the road outside the walls. Many of the new residences were built by wealthy merchants and others from the City of London as second homes. About 0.7 km (0.4 mi) south of Greenwich town centre is the Catholic Our Ladye Star of the Sea, a Gothic Revival church designed by William Wardell in the 1840s.

Notable residents include Chris Rokos, who owns grade II-listed Hillside, opposite Jonathan Sumption, Lord Sumption, who successfully blocked Rokos' planning application.

== Bibliography ==
- Cherry, Bridget & Pevsner, Nikolaus. London 2: South. Yale University Press, 2002.
- Guillery, Peter. Built from Below: British Architecture and the Vernacular. Routledge, 2010.
