= Our Ladye Star of the Sea =

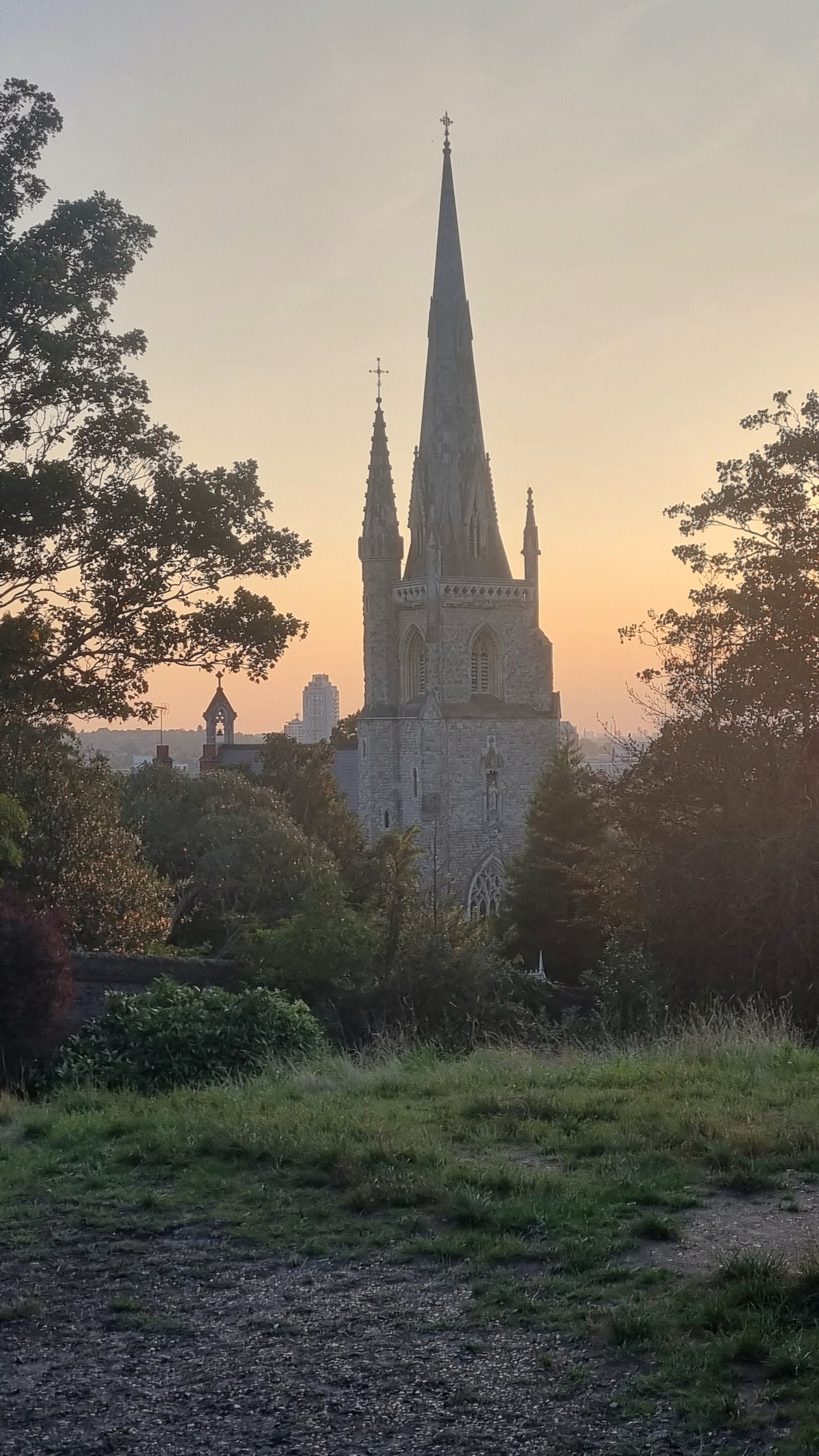
- Our Ladye Star of the Sea, viewed from Greenwich Park
- Our Ladye Star of the Sea
- 51°28′35″N 0°00′22″W
- Location: 68 Croom's Hill, London, SE10
- Country: England
- Denomination: Roman Catholic

History
- Status: Parish Church
- Founded: 1846
- Dedication: Our Lady
- Dedicated: 1852
- Consecrated: 16 September 1852

Architecture
- Functional status: Active
- Heritage designation: Grade II*
- Architect: William Wardell
- Style: Decorated Gothic
- Years built: 1851 (present)

Administration
- Diocese: Southwark

The Church of Our Ladye Star of the Sea is a Roman Catholic church situated south of Greenwich town centre on the west side of Croom's Hill, and west of Greenwich Park in southeast London. Today a Grade II* listed building, it was designed by William Wardell in a Decorated Gothic style, with a landmark spire, and with fittings and decorative elements designed by Augustus Pugin and his son E. W. Pugin. It was opened in 1851.

== History ==
Interior

A Roman Catholic mission was established in Greenwich in 1793 to serve around 500 Catholic pensioners in the Royal Naval Hospital. A chapel was originally built in Park Vista but proved inadequate, and fundraising began for a new church, led by a priest, Richard Michael North. His mother had reputedly vowed to build a church dedicated to Our Lady after her two sons were rescued following a Thames boating accident, and donated the site on Croom's Hill. The church was constructed between 1846 and 1851, at a cost of over £8,000.

Wardell designed the church in a Decorated Gothic style, with a landmark spire, and it was constructed of Kentish ragstone with Caen stone dressings and roofed in Welsh slate. Work on the spire was completed in 1849; the cross at its apex is said to have been raised by Nelson's boatswain at the Battle of Trafalgar. Wardell's high altar was exhibited at the Great Exhibition of 1851. A friend and follower of Pugin, Wardell commissioned decoration and furnishings by him. The church was opened on 8 December 1851 by Bishop Thomas Grant, first bishop of Southwark, and was consecrated on 16 September 1852.

Around 1863, a Perpendicular-style marble tomb and effigy for Canon Richard North was installed between the church's northeast chapel and its sanctuary (designed by Edward Welby Pugin). A chapel dedicated to the Sacred Heart was opened in September 1891.

In 1902, social reformer Charles Booth described the church's location: "The beauty of the western side of Greenwich Park, and the steep declivities in which Blackheath terminates, is quite remarkable," with the church described as "a beautiful edifice, partly old, on the completion and adornment of which much has been spent".

A restoration was carried out in 1901, and the church was subject to a more major refurbishment in 1965 by Myles and Deirdre Dove. The building was listed in 1973, and recategorised in 2015. In November 2025, Historic England added the church to its register of London buildings at risk (identified as needing restoration).

== See also ==
- Catholic Church in England and Wales
- Archdiocese of Southwark
