= Hand Fan Museum =

Coordinates: 38.61061°N 122.87091°W

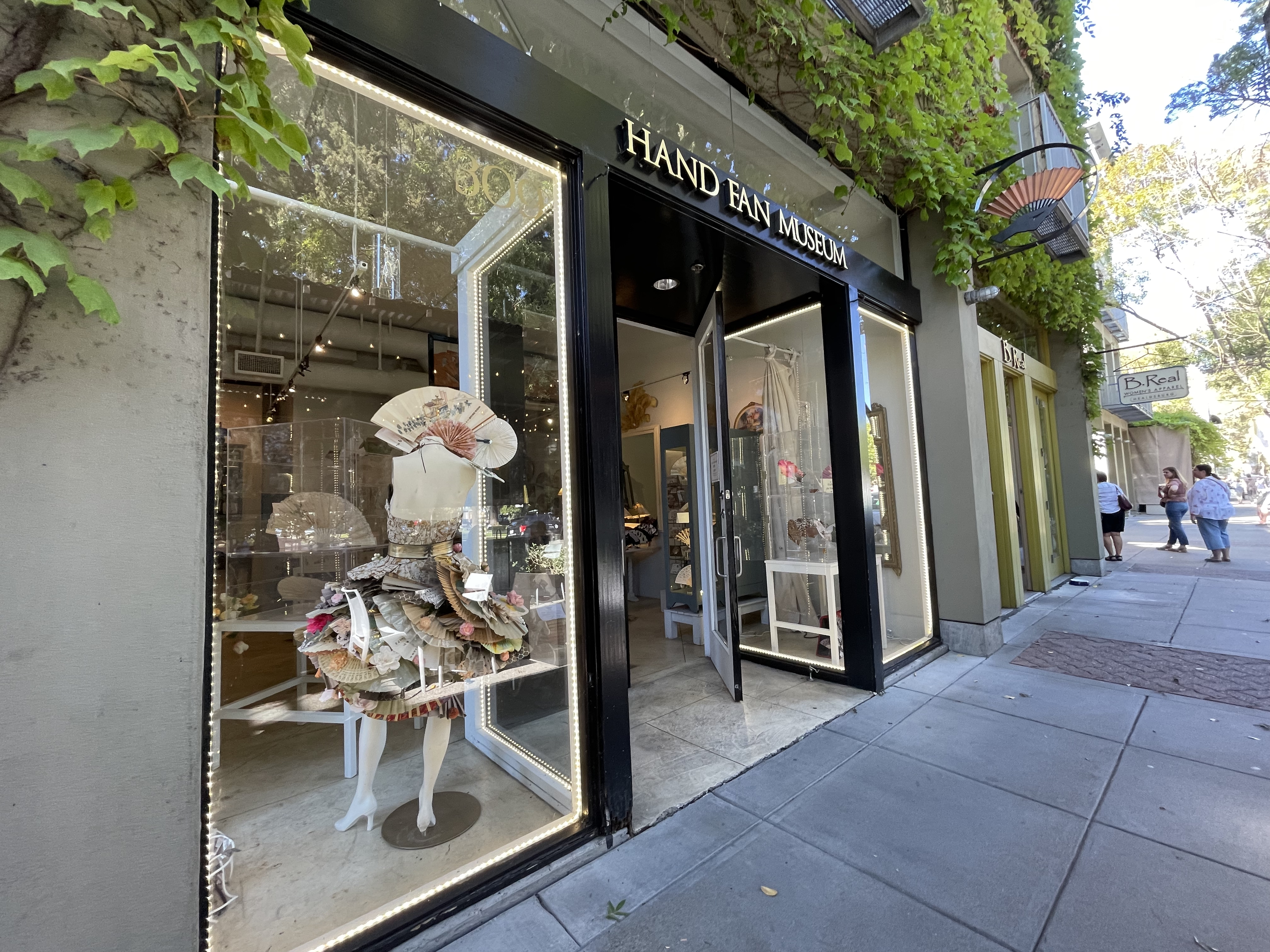
- Established: 2002
- Location: Healdsburg, California, United States
- Type: Art museum
- Director: Liz Keeley
- President: Pamela Sher
- Website: www.handfanmuseum.org

The Hand Fan Museum is a museum of hand fans located in Healdsburg, California, United States. It is the only fan museum in the USA.

== History ==
The museum opened in 2002 and has a permanent collection of over 2,500 hand fans, spanning several centuries and many styles. Founded by Museum President and FANA Board Member Pamela Sher, the Museum is currently housed on the Hotel Healdsburg Complex.

In September 2005, the Museum hosted its first Annual Fan Convention in the California Wine Country to bring Museum members together to mark the donation of over 200 fans to the Museum by artist Charlotte C. Stokes of Pennsylvania.

In Spring 2010, the Museum was moved into the H2hotel building with a connected conference room to conduct lectures and the free Art Program it provides to local schools. The Hand Fan Museum is currently managed by Liz Keeley.

The collection has been featured in the book Fantastic Fans.

== Gallery ==
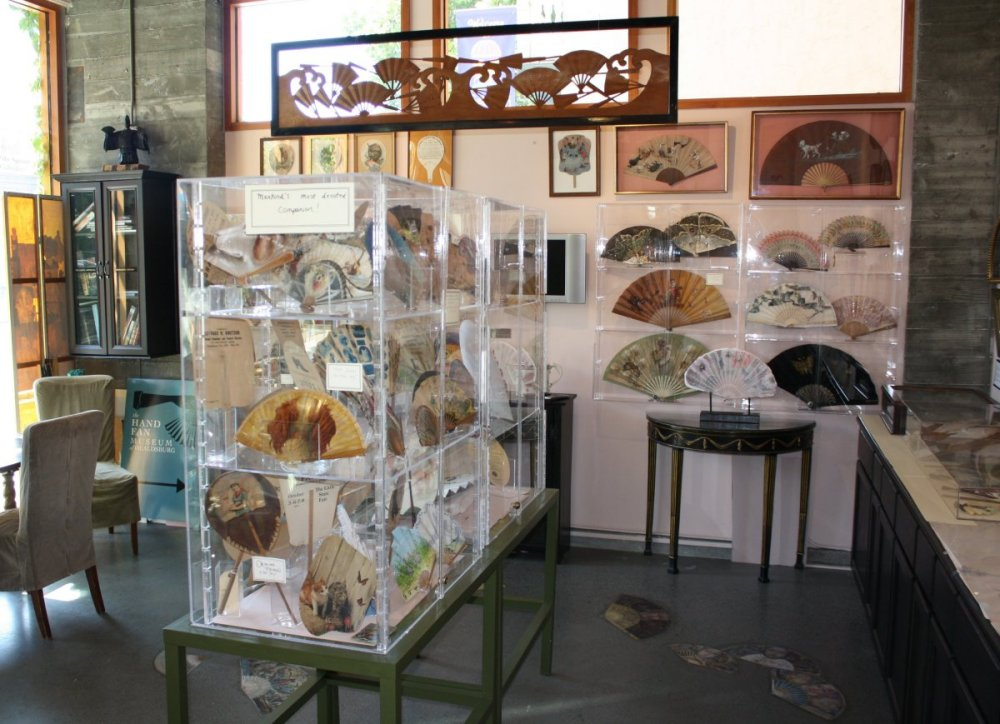
Museum exhibits

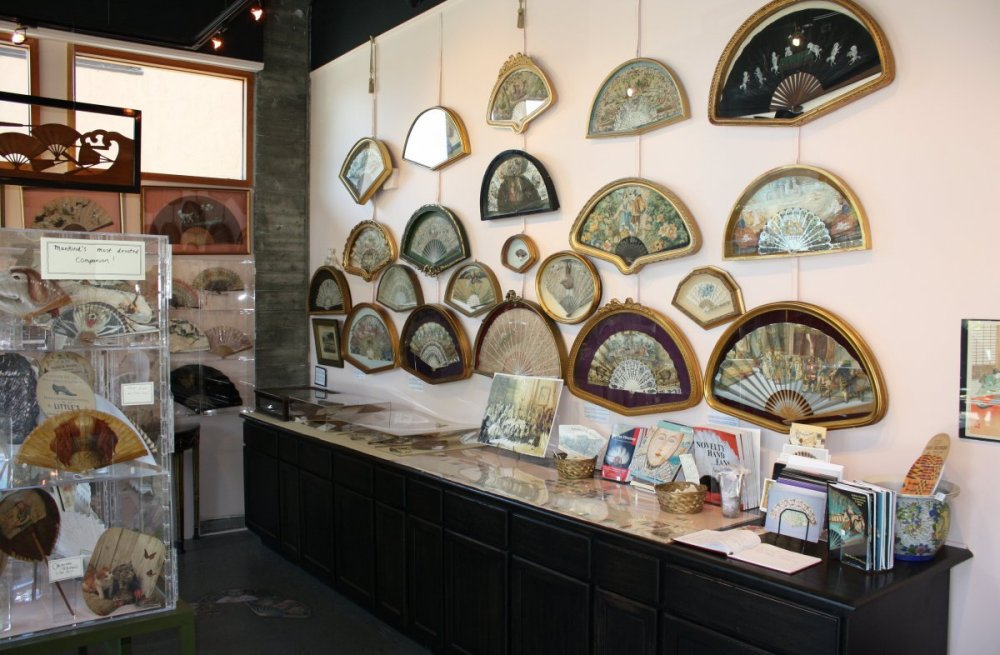
Further museum exhibits

== See also ==
- Fan Museum, London, UK
