= St Joseph's College, Mark Cross =

Coordinates: 51.0547°N 0.2487°E

St Joseph's College
- Location in East Sussex
- OS grid reference: TQ5769730775
- Location: Rotherfield
- Country: England
- Denomination: Roman Catholic

History
- Former name: St. Michael's Orphanage for Girls
- Founded: 1869
- Founder(s): Dowager Duchess of Leeds, Louisa Catherine Caton
- Dedication: Saint Joseph

Architecture
- Functional status: Closed
- Heritage designation: Grade II Listed
- Designated: 1 February 1991
- Architect(s): George Goldie, E. W. Pugin and Joseph Hansom
- Closed: 1970

St Joseph's College was a Roman Catholic minor seminary in Mark Cross, outside Rotherfield in East Sussex. It was designed by Edward Pugin and the site dates to 1869. It is a Grade II listed building. It has been named by the Victorian Society as a heritage building at risk of disrepair.

== St. Michael's Orphanage for Girls ==
It was originally known as St. Michael's Orphanage for Girls and was built in 1869. The exterior was designed by George Goldie and the interior was designed by E. W. Pugin. It was paid for by a donation from the Duchess of Leeds, wife of Francis D'Arcy-Osborne, 7th Duke of Leeds. The site itself consisted of 54 acres of land and it was run by the Society of the Holy Child Jesus as part of a pair of orphanages, the other one being Mayfield College. In 1903, it was extended to allow for more accommodation in the convent, the extension was designed by Joseph Hansom.

=== St Joseph's College ===
In 1925, it was bought by the Archdiocese of Southwark to serve as a minor seminary for St John's Seminary in Wonersh. In 1960, the building was extended to allow for six extra classrooms.

== Post-seminary ==
=== Legat's School of Ballet ===
In 1970, it was closed and was bought by a group and it became the Legat's School of Ballet, founded by Nadine Nicolaeva-Legat.

=== Jameah Islameah School ===
In 1992, it was bought by a charity called Jameah Islameah. In 2006, it was raided by Metropolitan Police who believed it was being used as a training camp for terrorists. In 2007, it was closed by the Department for Education and Skills for failing standards. It did not have any pupils at the time.

== See also ==
- St John's Seminary, Wonersh
