= James Danell =

English prelate

The Right Reverend James Danell
- Bishop of Southwark
- Church: Roman Catholic Church
- Diocese: Southwark
- Appointed: 10 January 1871
- Installed: 25 March 1871
- Term ended: 14 June 1881
- Predecessor: Thomas Grant
- Successor: Robert Aston Coffin

Orders
- Ordination: 6 June 1848 by Denis-Auguste Affre
- Consecration: 25 March 1871 by Henry Edward Manning

Personal details
- Born: 14 July 1821 London, United Kingdom of Great Britain and Ireland
- Died: 14 June 1881 (aged 59)
- Denomination: Roman Catholic
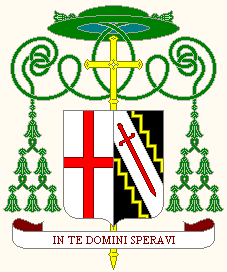
- Coat of arms

James Danell (14 July 1821 – 14 June 1881) was an English prelate of the Roman Catholic Church. He served as the Roman Catholic Bishop of Southwark from 1871 to 1881.

Born in London on 14 July 1821, he was ordained to the priesthood by Archbishop Denis-Auguste Affre of Paris on 6 June 1848. Danell was appointed the Bishop of the Roman Catholic Diocese of Southwark by the Holy See on 10 January 1871. His consecration to the Episcopate took place on 25 March 1871, the principal consecrator was Archbishop (later Cardinal) Henry Edward Manning of Westminster, and the principal co-consecrators were Bishop Thomas Joseph Brown of Newport and Menevia and Bishop William Placid Morris, Vicar Apostolic Emeritus of Cape Town.

He died in office on 14 June 1881, aged 59.

Catholic Church titles
Preceded by Thomas Grant	Bishop of Southwark; 1871–1881	Succeeded by Robert Aston Coffin
