= John Butt (bishop) =

English prelate

John Baptist Butt
- Bishop of Southwark
- Church: Catholic Church
- Diocese: Diocese of Southwark
- In office: 26 June 1885 – 29 March 1897
- Predecessor: Robert Coffin
- Successor: Francis Bourne
- Other post: Titular Bishop of Sebastopolis in Thracia (1897-1899)
- Previous posts: Titular Bishop of Milo (1884-1885); Auxiliary Bishop of Southwark (1884-1885)

Orders
- Ordination: 15 July 1849 by Nicholas Wiseman
- Consecration: 29 January 1885 by William Weathers

Personal details
- Born: 20 April 1826 Richmond, London, United Kingdom of Great Britain and Ireland
- Died: 1 November 1899 (aged 73) Arundel, West Sussex, United Kingdom of Great Britain and Ireland

Styles of John Baptist Butt
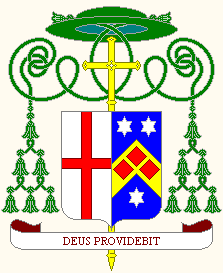
- Reference style: The Right Reverend
- Spoken style: My Lord
- Religious style: Bishop

John Baptist Butt (20 April 1826 – 1 November 1899) was an English prelate who served as the fourth Roman Catholic Bishop of Southwark from 1885 to 1897.

== Life ==
Born in Richmond, Surrey, Butt was ordained to the priesthood by Bishop Nicholas Wiseman, Vicar Apostolic of the London District on 15 July 1849. He then served as a military chaplain.

Butt was appointed an auxiliary bishop of Southwark and Titular Bishop of Milo on 19 December 1884. He was consecrated by Arthur Riddell, Bishop of Northampton on 29 January 1885, with bishops William Vaughan and John Vertue serving as co-consecrators. Following the death of Bishop Robert Coffin on 6 April 1885, Butt was appointed the diocesan Bishop of the Diocese of Southwark on 26 June 1885.

He founded St John's Seminary, Wonersh, near Guildford, Surrey in 1889, and employed as his first rector the young priest Francis Bourne, later to become Cardinal Archbishop of Westminster.

Butt resigned as Bishop of Southwark on 29 March 1897, and appointed Titular Bishop of Sebastopolis in Thracia on 9 April 1897. He died in Arundel on 1 November 1899, aged 73, and was buried at St John’s Seminary in Wonersh. He had been a bishop for almost 15 years. There is a memorial to him Arundel Cathedral and in relief on the walls of the cathedral are the Stations of the Cross to his memory.

Brass placque remembering Bishop John Butt

Catholic Church titles
Preceded by Marcelo Spinola y Maestre	Titular Bishop of Milo; 1884–1885	Vacant Title next held by Gustave-Charles-Marie Mutel
Preceded by Robert Aston Coffin	Bishop of Southwark; 1885–1897	Succeeded by Francis Alphonsus Bourne
Vacant Title last held by Sebastián Rodriguez de Viezna	Titular Bishop of Sebastopolis in Thracia; 1897–1899	Vacant Title next held by Sante Mei
