= Fan Museum =

Museum in Greenwich, London

The Fan Museum
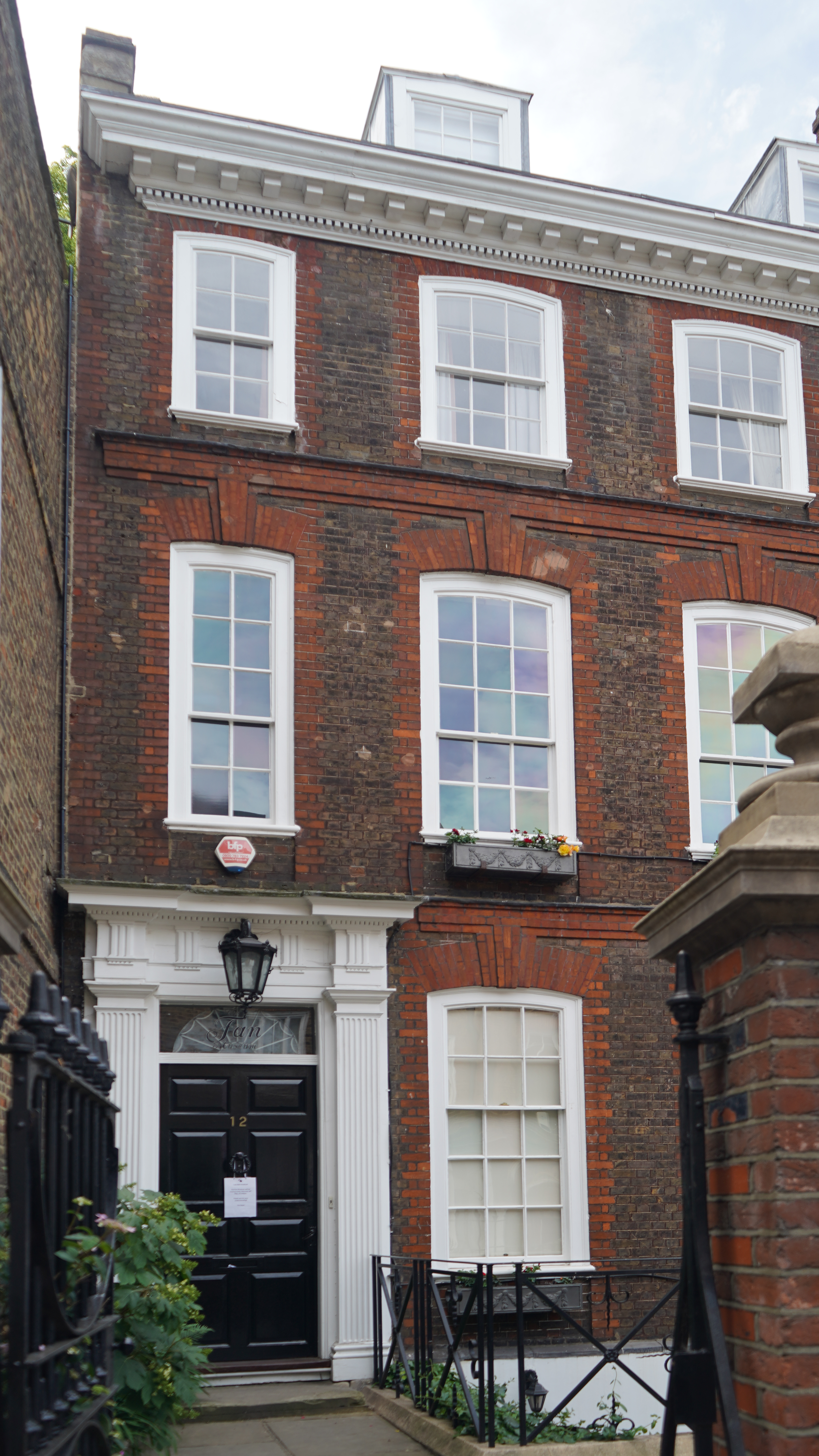

- Location within Royal Borough of Greenwich
- Established: 1991; 35 years ago
- Location: Croom's Hill, Greenwich; London, SE10; United Kingdom
- Coordinates: 51°28′43″N 0°0′28″W
- Public transit access: Greenwich
- Website: Official website

The Fan Museum, which opened in 1991, is the world's first museum dedicated to the preservation and display of hand fans. It is located within two grade II* listed houses that were built in 1721 within the Greenwich World Heritage Site on Croom's Hill in southeast London, England. Along with the museum, there is an orangery decorated with murals, a Japanese-style garden with a fan-shaped parterre, a pond, and a stream.

== Overview ==
The museum owns over 6,000 fans and other fan-related cultural materials as of 2023. The oldest fan in the collection dates from the 11th century and the collection of 18th and 19th-century European fans is extensive. The entire collection is not displayed permanently due to conservation concerns, but there is a permanent educational display which teaches about fan history, manufacturing processes, and the various forms of fan. Exhibits include a fan with a built-in ear trumpet and one with a repair kit built into the design. Fan-making classes are also held at the Fan Museum. The Fan Museum also contains a reference library.

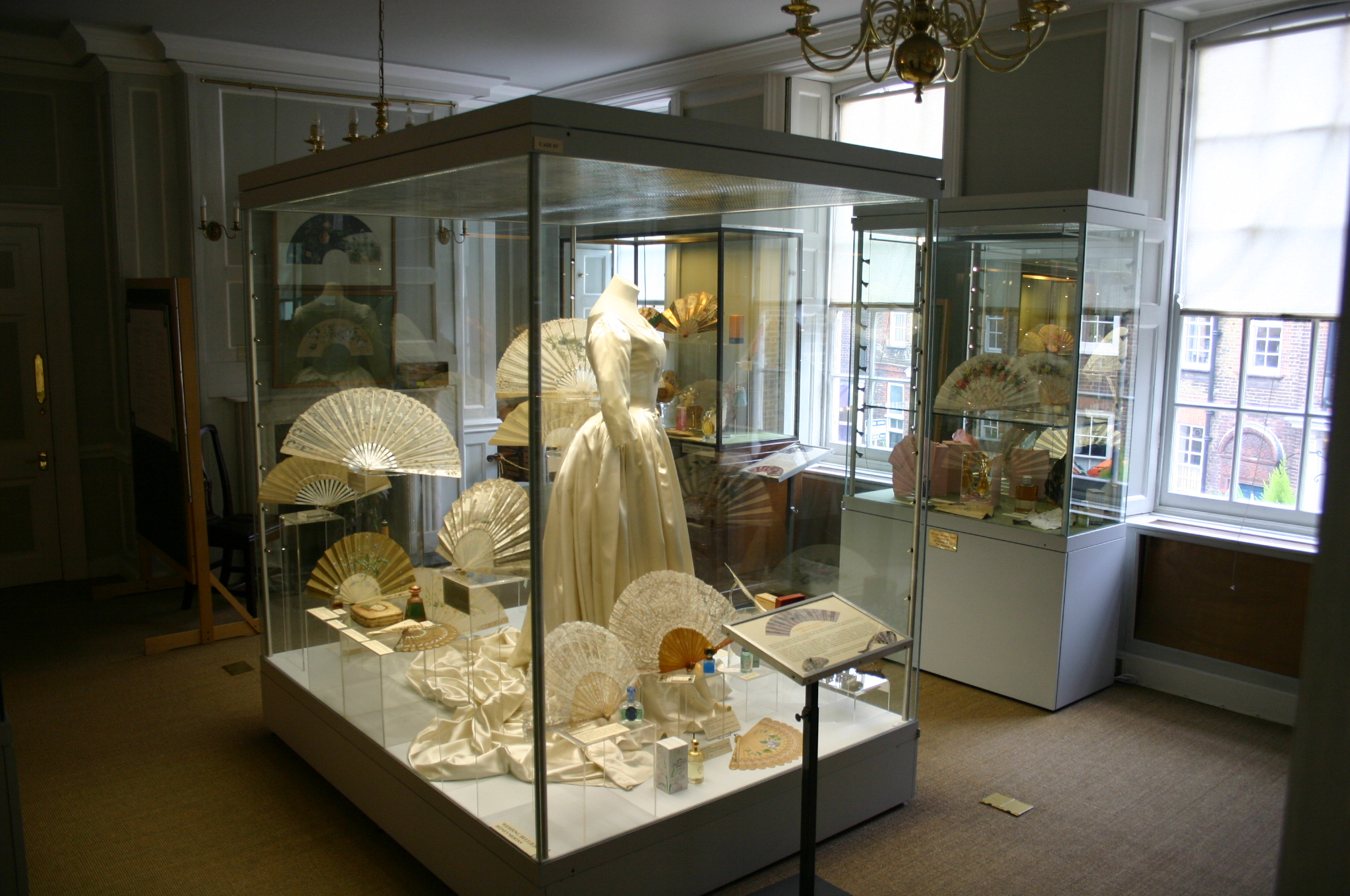
Exhibits at the Fan Museum, 2007

The Fan Museum is not publicly funded.

== See also ==
- Greenwich Visitor Centre
- List of London museums
- The Hand Fan Museum, California, United States
