= Robert Coffin (bishop) =

English Redemptorist and Bishop of Southwark

The Right Reverend Robert Coffin CSsR
- Bishop of Southwark
- Church: Latin Church
- Diocese: Southwark
- Appointed: 23 May 1882
- Installed: 27 July 1882
- Term ended: 6 April 1885
- Predecessor: James Danell
- Successor: John Butt

Orders
- Ordination: 31 October 1847
- Consecration: 11 June 1882 by Edward Henry Howard

Personal details
- Born: Robert Aston Coffin; 19 July 1819 Brighton, England
- Died: 6 April 1885 (aged 65) Teignmouth, England
- Denomination: Roman Catholic
- Education: Christ Church, Oxford
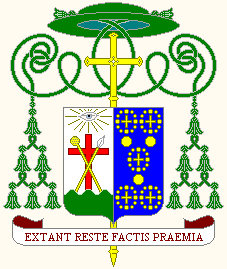
- Coat of arms

Robert Aston Coffin CSsR (19 July 1819 – 6 April 1885) was an English Redemptorist and Bishop of Southwark (25 May 1882 – 6 April 1885).

Coffin was born at Brighton and educated at Harrow School and at Christ Church, Oxford (BA 1841, MA 1843). In 1843 he became vicar of St Mary Magdalen's Church, Oxford, but resigned two years later, and was received into the Roman Catholic Church on 3 December 1845. For a year after this he resided with Ambrose Lisle Phillips at Grace Dieu Manor, and then he went with John Henry Newman to Rome, where he was ordained priest in 1847.

Coffin joined the Oratory of St Philip Neri, and in 1848–9 he was provost of the Oratorian community at St Wilfrid's, Cotton Hall, Staffordshire. He then left the Oratorians and was received into the novitiate of the Redemptorist Fathers at Trond in Belgium, and made his profession on 2 February 1852. In 1855 he was chosen Rector of St Mary's Roman Catholic Church, Clapham, and in 1865 appointed to the office of Provincial Superior, in which he was successively confirmed every three years until his elevation to the episcopate. From 1852 to 1872 he was mostly employed in preaching missions and giving clergy retreats throughout England, Ireland and Scotland.

In April 1882 Pope Leo XIII appointed Coffin to the see of Southwark, in succession to James Danell. He was consecrated by Cardinal Howard in the St Alphonsus Liguori Church at Rome, 11 June 1882, and enthroned at St George's Cathedral, Southwark, on 27 July. He died at the house of the Redemptorists at Teignmouth.

== Works ==
Coffin published English translations of many of the works of Alphonso de' Liguori; and of Blosius's Oratory of the Faithful Soul.
