= Thomas Grant (bishop) =

Roman Catholic bishop (1816–1870)

- Bishop of Southwark
- Diocese: Southwark
- See: Southwark
- Appointed: 27 June 1851
- Installed: 6 July 1851
- Term ended: 1 June 1870
- Predecessor: None
- Successor: James Danell

Orders
- Ordination: 28 November 1841
- Consecration: 6 July 1851 by Giacomo Filippo Fransoni

Personal details
- Born: 25 November 1816 Ligny-les-Aires, France
- Died: 1 June 1870 (aged 53) Rome
- Denomination: Roman Catholic

Thomas Grant (1816–1870) was a Roman Catholic bishop. He was born in France to British parents in the years following the defeat of the French at Waterloo. He became known as a great negotiator as the Roman Catholic hierarchy was rebuilt in the United Kingdom. He died of cancer while in Rome to attend the first Vatican Council.

== Biography ==
=== Early life ===
Born at Ligny-les-Aires, Arras, France, on 25 November 1816, Thomas Grant was the son of Bernard Grant, an Irishman from Acheson's Mill, near Newry. At about the age of fourteen, during an Orange riot, Bernard's family was burnt out of their home and moved to Drogheda, where he learned the trade of a weaver. At the age of eighteen, Bernard enlisted in the 71st Highlanders, became sergeant, and finally purchased a commission. His mother, Ann M'Gowan, was also Irish by birth, but had moved to Glasgow when still a child. She accompanied her husband to France during the Napoleonic wars, where his regiment saw action as part of the 3rd Brigade at the Battle of Waterloo in June 1815.

Thomas had an older brother, John, who at the age of five was left in the care of an uncle in London to be educated rather than to follow the regiment which was frequently on the move. Thomas grew up as "a child of a regiment", which subsequently had postings in Bermuda, and England, Cork, and Malta.

In 1824, the regiment sailed from Hull for Canada. Young Thomas was joined by his older brother, John and a younger brother, William. John died in an accident, and his mother, her health undermined by caring for him and with grief, it was thought that a return to England might bring some improvement, but she died on the voyage home and was buried at sea. Thomas was ten years old. As Thomas had indicated that he wished to become a priest, when the regiment moved from Chester, Thomas remained in the care of the local pastor, John Briggs, later bishop of the Diocese of Beverley, who continued the boy's education.

=== Rome ===
In January 1829 he was sent to St Cuthbert's College, at Ushaw, where he studied until 1836. He was then sent to study philosophy and theology at the English College at Rome, where Nicholas Wiseman was rector. There he developed a particular devotion to Mary, under the title Sedes Sapientiae. He was ordained priest on 28 November 1841, was created doctor of divinity and appointed as secretary to Cardinal Acton, a position in which he acquired a knowledge of canon law, and acquaintance with the method of conducting ecclesiastical affairs at Rome. Grant was fluent in Latin, French, and Italian. In 1843, then Anglican cleric Frederick Faber visited Rome, and Grant served as his tour guide.

In October 1844, at the early age of twenty-eight, he became rector of the English College, Rome. In the months leading up to the proclamation of the Roman Republic, the clergy in Rome were obliged to adopt secular garb for safety. In April 1849, with the French landing at Civitavecchia, the Rector sent the students to the cramped summer house at Monte Porzio, while remaining in Rome to protect the College. Pope Pius IX had withdrawn to Gaeta, leaving a number of important documents with Grant at the English College.

After the departure of the students, Grant hung the Union Jack on the outside of the building to discourage looters. He stayed in contact with the students by letters, disguised as cigars, delivered by courier. The students returned in mid-July.

Grant was also made agent for the English bishops. In this capacity he assisted William Bernard Ullathorne, who was then negotiating for the restoration of the English hierarchy. He also translated for Propaganda all English documents relating to the matter, and furnished the materials for the historical preface to the Decree of 1850.

=== Southwark ===
On 4 July 1851, Grant was consecrated bishop of the new Diocese of Southwark. Anti-Catholic elements denounced the establishment of a Catholic hierarchy as "papal aggression". The bishops were surprised by the level of hostility, as they had explained their intentions to Lord Minto, the father-in-law of Lord John Russell, three years earlier.

The Roman Catholic Relief Act 1829 had forbidden the use of the old titles except by the clergy of the established Protestant Church, The Catholic Church had refrained from using the ancient titles of the existing Anglican sees, and had created new titles for their bishoprics. In the wake of widespread popular "no popery" outbursts, Prime Minister Lord John Russell passed the Ecclesiastical Titles Act 1851 as an anti-Roman Catholic measure. The Act was largely ineffective since while Roman Catholic community unofficially used the territorial titles, the bishops themselves carefully stayed within the letter of the law. No one was ever prosecuted.

To the newly appointed hierarchy he was, as Bishop Ullathorne testified, most useful: "His acuteness of learning, readiness of resource and knowledge of the forms of ecclesiastical business made him invaluable to our joint counsels at home, whether in synods or in our yearly episcopal meetings; and his obligingness, his untiring spirit of work, and the expedition and accuracy with which he struck off documents in Latin, Italian, or English, naturally brought the greater part of such work on his shoulders."

Grant soon won the confidence of Catholics and others. As the government was shy of transacting business directly with Cardinal Wiseman, many negotiations were carried on by Grant, who was specially successful in obtaining from the government the appointment of military and naval chaplains, as well as prison chaplains. He also was successful in obtaining some Sisters of Mercy from Bermondsey to serve in the military hospitals in the Crimea. Bishop Grant gave great attention to orphanages run by the Sisters of Our Lady of Fidelity in Norwood and North Hyde. The bishop was in Rome in December 1854 for the promulgation of the dogma of the Immaculate Conception. In 1859, Grant wrote to Chaplain John Vertue expressing dismay on the subject of a chaplain's uniform then under discussion, lest their priestly role be subordinated to their military rank. He particularly did not wish to see chaplains out on parade.

In the administration of his diocese he proved equal to the task of organization, which was necessary in an age of rapid expansion, while the remarkable sanctity of his private life led to his being generally regarded as a saint, and caused Pius IX, when he learned of his death, to exclaim "Another saint in heaven!" The virtues of charity and humility in particular were practised by him in an heroic degree.

The last years of his life were spent in great suffering, caused by cancer, and when he set out to attend the First Vatican Council at Rome in 1870, he knew that he would not return. He was appointed member of the Congregation for the Oriental Rites and the Apostolic Missions, but was too ill to take an active part in the proceedings. He died in Rome on 1 June 1870. After death his body was brought back to England for burial.
