= Peter Amigo =

British Roman Catholic bishop (1864–1949)

Peter Emmanuel Amigo
- Bishop of Southwark
- Amigo in October 1929.
- Diocese: Southwark
- See: Southwark
- Appointed: 12 March 1904
- Installed: 25 March 1904
- Term ended: 1 October 1949
- Predecessor: Francis Alphonsus Bourne
- Successor: Cyril Conrad Cowderoy

Orders
- Ordination: 25 February 1888
- Consecration: 25 March 1904 by Francis Alphonsus Bourne

Personal details
- Born: 26 May 1864 Gibraltar
- Died: 1 October 1949 (aged 85)
- Denomination: Roman Catholic

Peter Emmanuel Amigo (26 May 1864 – 1 October 1949) was a Roman Catholic bishop in the Catholic Church in England and Wales. He founded The John Fisher School in 1929.

== Biography ==
Peter Amigo was born at Gibraltar, the ninth of eleven children born to Peter Lawrence and Emily Amigo. His father was a flour merchant. Young Peter studied at St Edmund's College, Ware, and St. Thomas's, Hammersmith. He was ordained priest on 25 February 1888. He was for a short time at Stoke Newington, then professor at St Edmund's from September 1888 until July 1892.

Amigo was then appointed assistant priest at Hammersmith from September 1892 to June 1896. He was afterwards at Ss Mary and Michael Church, Commercial Road, East London, first as assistant priest, then as rector from June 1896 to April 1901. He was then appointed rector of the mission at Walworth in the (then) Diocese of Southwark.

=== Bishop of Southwark ===
Amigo was consecrated as Bishop of Southwark by Cardinal Francis Bourne on 25 March 1904. Bishop Amigo imposed "minor excommunication" on the Modernist priest George Tyrrell and restricted the possibility of a full Catholic burial when Tyrrell died at Storrington in July 1909. Tyrrell's friend, French priest Henri Brémond nonetheless, attended the burial, made the sign of the cross over the grave, and gave an address for which Amigo then suspended him 'a divinis'. Brémond made his peace with the bishop later that summer and his faculties to celebrate Mass were restored that November.

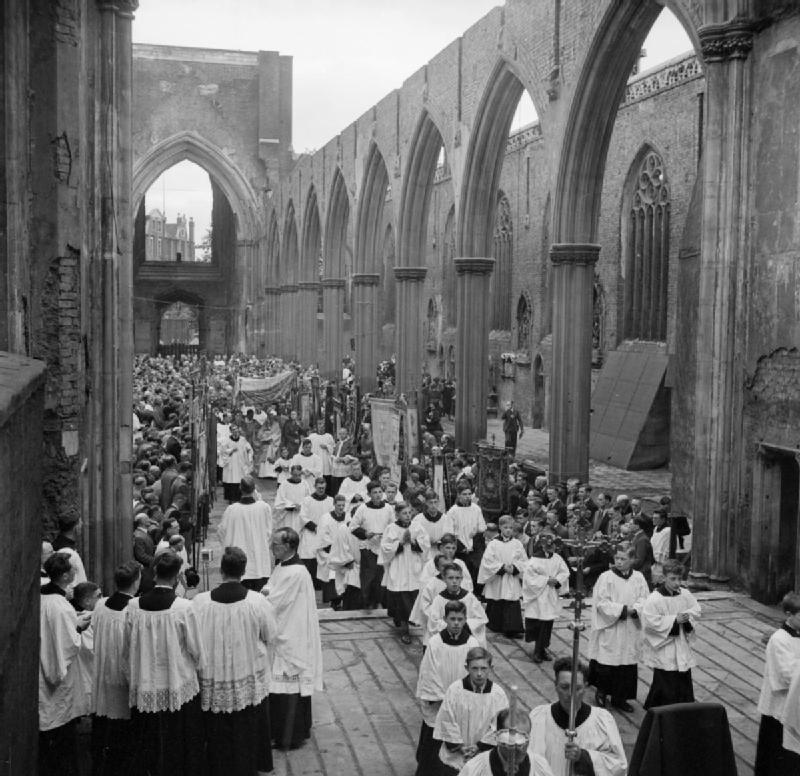
Corpus Christi Service at bombed-out St George's Cathedral, 1944

After the death of Lord Mayor of Cork and hunger-striker Terence MacSwiney (pron. MacSweeney) in Brixton Prison in October 1920, Amigo granted his family's request for use of the cathedral, despite the government urging otherwise. The bishop said that the Lord Mayor was a Catholic and entitled to the services of his church. Throughout MacSwiney's hunger strike, Amigo had written to politicians at Westminster to petition for his release. MacSwiney's body lay in state in Southwark Cathedral while 30,000 mourners passed by. After the cathedral was severely damaged by an incendiary bomb during World War II, the Irish helped defray the cost of rebuilding. A plaque in St. Patrick's Chapel reads:

This Chapel of St. Patrick is the generous gift of the people of Ireland, a tribute of grateful affection to Archbishop Peter Amigo, and in particular to recall his receiving in honour the body of Terence MacSwiney Lord Mayor of Cork which rested in this cathedral 27–28 October 1920, before burial in his native land."

The Terence MacSwiney commemoration Mass, sponsored by the London Cork Association, is held each year in the St. George's Cathedral on the Sunday nearest to October 25, MacSwiney's date of death.

Amigo founded the John Fisher School for boys in 1929, originally at Duppas Hill. In 1938, in recognition of Amigo's golden jubilee, Pope Pius XI conferred on him the personal title of Archbishop. He remained in control of the diocese until his death on 1 October 1949, aged 85.

== Legacy ==
Archbishop Michael Bowen said of Amigo: "He was a larger than life figure, unafraid of controversy, yet whose every action was embued with a great priestly zeal."

The John Fisher School, now located at Peaks Hill, continues to educate and as of 2021 had an enrollment of over 1,000 students. Bishop Amigo Jubilee Hall at St George's Cathedral, Southwark is named in his honor.

== See also ==
- List of Gibraltarians

== Sources ==
- Henri Brémond, Maurice Blondel: Correspondance établie, présentée et annotée par André Blanchet, tome 2:le grand dessein de Henri Brémond 1905-1920, Aubier
