= Archbishop of Southwark =

- Archbishopric

catholic
- Coat of arms
- Incumbent: John Wilson

Location
- Ecclesiastical province: Southwark

Information
- Established: Bishopric in 1850; Archbishopric in 1965
- Archdiocese: Southwark
- Cathedral: St George's Cathedral, Southwark

The Archbishop of Southwark (Br [ˈsʌðɨk]) is the ordinary of the Roman Catholic Archdiocese of Southwark. As such, he is the Metropolitan of the Province of Southwark.

The archdiocese has an area of 3,000 km^{2} (1,200 sq mi) and covers the London Boroughs south of the Thames, the county of Kent and the Medway Unitary Authority. The Metropolitan See is in Southwark where the archbishop's seat is located at the St George's Cathedral.

The eleventh and current archbishop is John Wilson, who was appointed on 10 June 2019 and was installed on 25 July 2019.

== History ==
The Diocese of Southwark was created on 29 September 1850 and originally covered the historic counties of Surrey, Berkshire, Hampshire, Kent, Sussex, the Isle of Wight, and the Channel Islands. It lost territory on the creation of the Diocese of Portsmouth on 19 May 1882. The diocese lost further territory on the creation of the Diocese of Arundel & Brighton on 28 May 1965. However, on the same day the diocese of Southwark was elevated to an archdiocese when the ecclesiastical province of Southwark was established; from 1850 the diocese had been part of the Province of Westminster. The metropolitan archbishop of Southwark has jurisdiction over the bishops of Arundel & Brighton, of Plymouth, and of Portsmouth.

== List of bishops and archbishops ==
=== Bishops of Southwark ===
Roman Catholic Bishops of Southwark
From	Until	Incumbent	Notes
1851	1870	Thomas Grant	Appointed bishop on 27 June 1851 and consecrated on 6 July 1851. Died in office on 31 May 1870.
1871	1881	James Danell	Appointed bishop on 10 January 1871 and consecrated on 25 March 1871. Died in office on 14 June 1881.
1882	1885	Robert Aston Coffin, C.SS.R.	Appointed bishop on 25 May 1882, consecrated on 11 June 1882 and installed on 27 July 1882. Died in office on 6 April 1885.
1885	1897	John Baptist Butt	Formerly an auxiliary bishop of Southwark (1884–1885). Appointed Bishop of Southwark on 26 June 1885. Resigned on 12 April 1897 and appointed Titular Bishop of Sebastopolis in Thracia. Died on 1 November 1899.
1897	1903	Francis Alphonsus Bourne	Appointed Coadjutor Bishop of Southwark on 27 March 1896 and consecrated on 9 April 1897. Succeeded Bishop of Southwark on 9 April 1897. Translated to the archbishopric of Westminster on 11 September 1903.
1904	1949	Peter Emmanuel Amigo	Appointed bishop on 12 March 1904 and consecrated on 25 March 1904. Appointed the personal title of archbishop on 18 December 1937. Died on 1 October 1949.
1949	1965	Cyril Conrad Cowderoy	Appointed bishop on 12 December 1949 and consecrated on 21 December 1949. Elevated from bishop to archbishop of Southwark on 28 May 1965.

=== Archbishops of Southwark ===
Roman Catholic Archbishops of Southwark
From	Until	Incumbent	Notes
1965	1976	Cyril Conrad Cowderoy	Elevated from bishop to archbishop of Southwark on 28 May 1965. Died in office on 10 October 1976.
1977	2003	Michael George Bowen	Previously Bishop of Arundel and Brighton (1971–1977). Appointed Archbishop of Southwark on 28 March 1977. Resigned on 6 November 2003.
2003	2009	Kevin John Patrick McDonald	Previously Bishop of Northampton (2001–2003). Appointed Archbishop of Southwark on 6 November 2003 and installed on 8 December 2003. Resigned on 4 December 2009.
2010	2019	Peter David Smith	Previously Archbishop of Cardiff (2001–2010). Appointed Archbishop of Southwark on 30 April 2010 and installed on 10 June 2010. Resigned 10 June 2019, appointed Apostolic Administrator until 25 July 2019.
2019	Present	John Wilson	Previously Auxiliary bishop in Archdiocese of Westminster (2016–2019). Appointed Archbishop of Southwark on 10 June 2019 and installed on 25 July 2019.

== See also ==
- Catholic Church in England and Wales

== Bibliography ==
- Brady, W. Maziere (1876). The Episcopal Succession in England, Scotland and Ireland, A.D. 1400 to 1875. Vol. 3. Rome: Tipografia Della Pace.
