= Thomas Doyle (priest) =

English Roman Catholic priest (1793-1879)

Thomas Doyle D.D. (1793–1879) was an English Roman Catholic priest, associated with the construction of St George's Cathedral, Southwark.

== Life ==
Doyle was born on 21 December 1793 in London, of Irish parents. He was studying at St. Edmund's College, Ware, where he had been organist, when in 1819 William Poynter made him a priest to counter a shortfall.

Doyle was sent to the site of the future St. George's Cathedral, then the Royal Belgian Chapel, on the London Road in Southwark, in 1820, and nine years later he became the senior priest there. St George's Fields was a site associated with the Gordon Riots, and Doyle was instrumental in the construction of the cathedral there, designed by Augustus Pugin.

Doyle began a discussion with Pugin on a large parish church, to accommodate an expanding Catholic population in South London, around 1839. He travelled in Europe to raise funds. Work started in September 1840, and the building was consecrated on 4 July 1848.

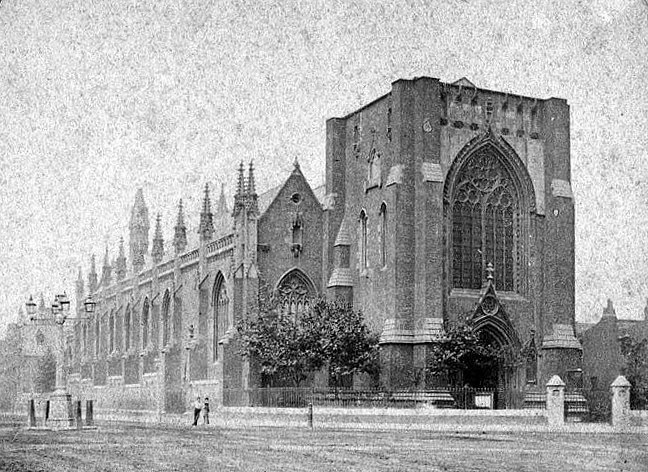
St George's Cathedral, Southwark, 1850s photograph

The Protestant Association issued a special tract on the occasion, The Opening of the new Popish Mass House in St. George's Fields. When the papal hierarchy was re-established in 1850, Doyle was made provost of the cathedral chapter of the newly erected See of Southwark.

Doyle was a good friend of John Henry Newman, and wrote to him in 1841, expressing the regrets of Southwark Catholic clergy for the attack on the Tractarians made by Joseph Rathborne. Doyle published frequently in The Tablet, as "Father Thomas". He died at St. George's Cathedral on 6 June 1879, and was buried there.

== Augusta Talbot case ==
On good terms with John Talbot, 16th Earl of Shrewsbury, Doyle around 1839 took on the guardianship of Augusta Talbot, a niece of the Earl. In 1850, this position involved him in publicly-expressed suspicion of his motives, when she was placed in St Joseph's Convent, Taunton (see St Joseph's Convent, Taunton#1851 case of Augusta Talbot). There was a court case in 1851, after which Augusta remained Doyle's ward, but left the convent, marrying Lord Edward Howard that year.

The case involved Craven Berkeley, Augusta's stepfather. He had married Augusta Talbot (née Jones), widow of George Henry Talbot and Augusta's mother, in 1839; she died in 1841. Doyle made a petition for access to Augusta (Doyle v Wright) in 1840. The custody petition of March 1851 continued that case. Popular interest in the issue linked anti-Catholic feeling with Augusta Talbot's status as an heiress to £80,000, around the allegation that the Catholic Church would profit if she died a nun.

== Notes ==
Attribution

This article incorporates text from a publication now in the public domain: Stephen, Leslie, ed. (1888). "Doyle, Thomas". Dictionary of National Biography. Vol. 15. London: Smith, Elder & Co.
