= Paul Hendricks =

The Right Reverend Paul Joseph Hendricks
- Auxiliary Bishop of Southwark; Titular Bishop of Rossmarkaeum
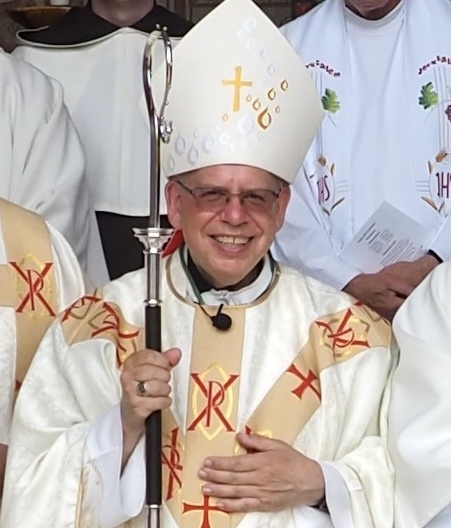
- Hendricks in 2025
- Church: Roman Catholic Church
- Archdiocese: Southwark
- Province: Southwark
- Appointed: 28 December 2005
- Installed: 14 February 2006

Orders
- Ordination: 29 July 1984 by Michael George Bowen
- Consecration: 14 February 2006 by Kevin John Patrick McDonald

Personal details
- Born: Paul Joseph Hendricks; 18 March 1956 (age 70) Beckenham, Kent, England
- Denomination: Catholic Church
- Education: Corpus Christi College, Oxford; Venerable English College

Paul Joseph Hendricks (born 18 March 1956) is an Auxiliary Roman Catholic bishop of the Archdiocese of Southwark and Titular Bishop of Diocese of Ross.

== Early life ==
Paul Hendricks was born in 1956 in Beckenham, Kent. He attended Corpus Christi College, Oxford, gaining in 1977 a degree in Physics. After working at the GEC Hirst Research Centre in Wembley, he began his studies for the priesthood at the Venerable English College, Rome in 1979, and was ordained priest in 1984 by Archbishop Michael Bowen. Fr. Hendricks served as curate at St Boniface Church in Tooting from 1984 to 1989, before becoming a lecturer in philosophy in 1989 at the Provincial Seminary of St John at Wonersh. He also served as Bursar of the Seminary until his appointment as Parish Priest of Our Lady of Sorrows, Peckham in 1999.

== Episcopal career (2006-present) ==
On 14 February 2006, Father Hendricks was ordained to the episcopate with Father Patrick Lynch at St George's Cathedral, Southwark, by Archbishop Kevin MacDonald, Archbishop of Southwark. He was appointed Titular Bishop of Rosemarkie by Pope Benedict XVI, and given pastoral responsibility for the South-West London area of the Archdiocese by Archbishop MacDonald. Since July 2022, Bishop Hendricks has oversight of the Kent Pastoral Area of the archdiocese, at the request of Archbishop John Wilson.
