= Rathborne =

Rathborne is a surname. Notable persons with the surname include:

- Aaron Rathborne (fl. 1605–1622), English surveyor
- Basil Rathbone (1892–1967), English actor
- Joseph Rathborne (1807–1842), English priest
- Luke Rathborne, musician
- St George Henry Rathborne (1854–1938), American writer
- Tina Rathborne (born 1950), American film director and screenwriter
