= John Jukes (bishop) =

The Right Reverend John Peter Jukes OFM Conv
- Titular Bishop of Strathearn; Auxiliary Bishop Emeritus of Southwark
- Church: Roman Catholic Church
- Archdiocese: Southwark
- See: Strathearn (titular)
- In office: 1979–1998

Orders
- Ordination: 19 July 1952 by Richard Downey
- Consecration: 30 January 1980 by Michael Bowen

Personal details
- Born: 7 August 1923 Eltham, London, England, United Kingdom
- Died: 21 November 2011 (aged 88) Huntly, Aberdeenshire, Scotland, United Kingdom

Ordination history of John Jukes
History
Priestly ordination
- Ordained by: Richard Downey (Liverpool)
Episcopal consecration
- Principal consecrator: Michael Bowen (Southwark)
- Co-consecrators: Anthony Emery (Portsmouth); Charles Henderson (Southwark aux.)

Styles of John Peter Jukes
- Reference style: The Right Reverend
- Spoken style: Your Excellency
- Religious style: Your Excellency

John Peter Jukes (7 August 1923 – 21 November 2011) was a British prelate of the Catholic Church. He was a member of the Conventual Franciscans.

Jukes was born in Eltham, ordained a priest on 19 July 1952. He was named Auxiliary Bishop of Southwark as well as Titular Bishop of Strathearn on 20 December 1979, and ordained on 30 January 1980. He had particular oversight of the Kent pastoral area. He retired on 11 December 1998. He died on 21 November 2011, aged 88.

== See also ==
- Archdiocese of Southwark

Catholic Church titles
Preceded by —	Auxiliary Bishop of Southwark; 1979–1998	Succeeded by —
Preceded by Hubertus Brandenburg	— TITULAR — Bishop of Strathearn; 1979–2011	Succeeded by Sébastien-Joseph Muyengo Mulombe
