= Howard Tripp =

English Roman Catholic prelate (1927–2022)

The Right Reverend Howard Tripp
- Auxiliary Bishop of Southwark
- Appointed: 20 December 1979
- Term ended: 7 January 2004
- Other post: Titular Bishop of Neoportus (1979–2022)

Orders
- Ordination: 31 May 1953 by Cyril Conrad Cowderoy
- Consecration: 30 January 1980 by Michael George Bowen

Personal details
- Born: 3 July 1927 Croydon, Surrey, England
- Died: 3 October 2022 (aged 95) Vauxhall, South London, England

Howard George Tripp (3 July 1927 – 3 October 2022) was a British Roman Catholic prelate.

Tripp was born in England and was ordained to the priesthood in 1953. He served as titular bishop of Neoportus and was auxiliary bishop of the Archdiocese of Southwark, England, from 1980 until his retirement in 2004. As an auxiliary bishop of Southwark, he had particular oversight of the deaneries of the archdiocese in South West London.

Tripp died on 3 October 2022, at the age of 95.

Catholic Church titles
Preceded by —	Auxiliary Bishop of Southwark; 1979–2004	Succeeded by —
Preceded by Fulton John Sheen	Titular Bishop of Neoportus; 1979–2022	Succeeded by Vacant
