= John Wilson (bishop) =

English Catholic prelate (born 1968)

The Most Reverend John Wilson
- Archbishop of Southwark
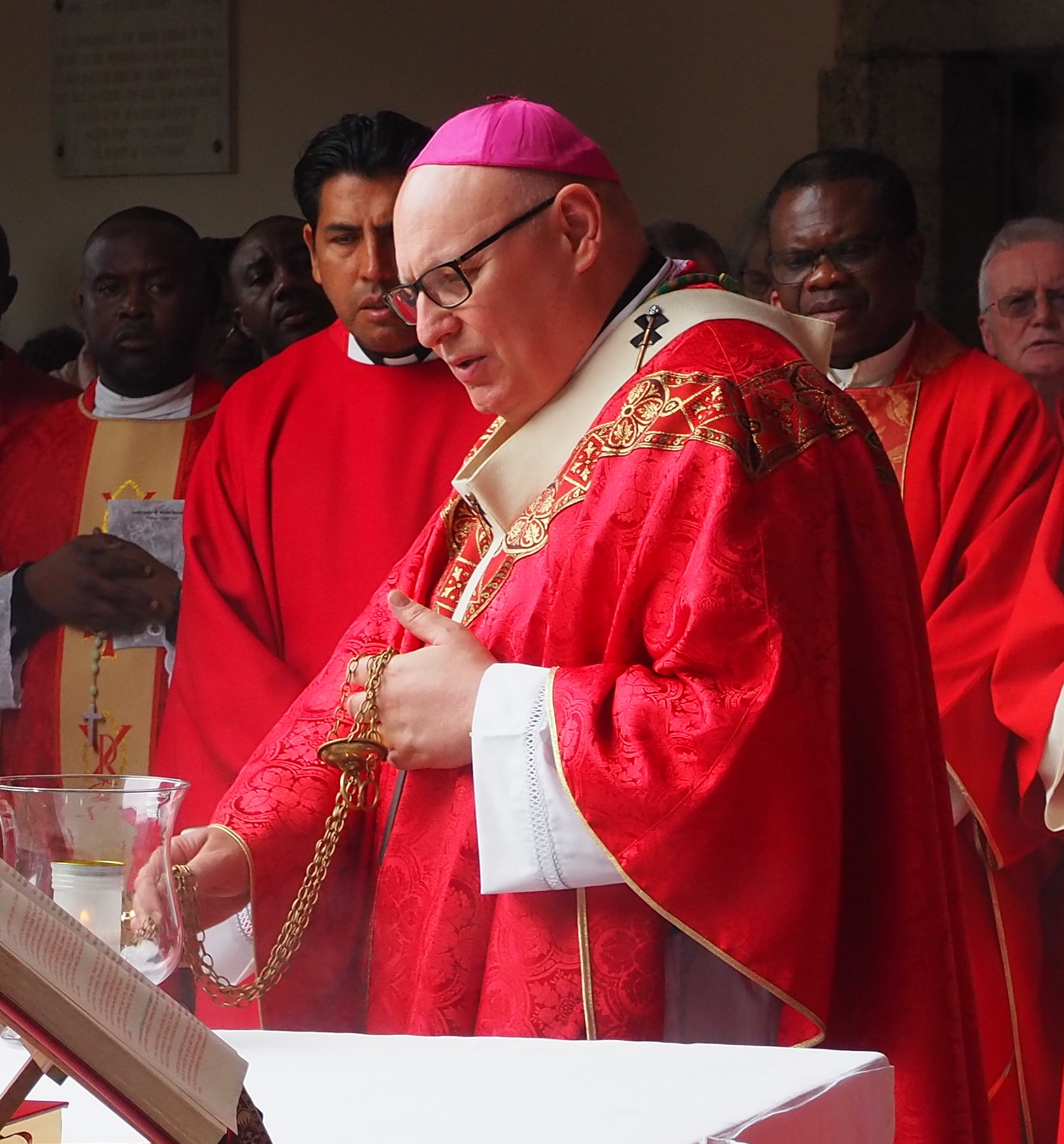
- Archbishop Wilson censing an altar in 2025
- Church: Catholic Church
- Archdiocese: Southwark
- Province: Southwark
- Appointed: 10 June 2019
- Installed: 25 July 2019
- Predecessor: Peter Smith
- Previous post: Auxiliary Bishop of Westminster & Titular Bishop of Lindisfarne (2016–2019)

Orders
- Ordination: 29 July 1995 by David Konstant
- Consecration: 25 January 2016 by Vincent Nichols

Personal details
- Born: 4 July 1968 (age 58) Sheffield, West Riding of Yorkshire, England
- Denomination: Catholic Church
- Education: University of Leeds; Pontifical Gregorian University; Durham University
- Motto: Benedictum Nomen Iesu (Latin for 'Blessed be the Name of Jesus')
- Styles
- Reference style: The Most Reverend
- Spoken style: Your Grace
- Religious style: Archbishop

Ordination history
History
Diaconal ordination
- Ordained by: Cyril Restieaux
- Date: 13 July 1994
Priestly ordination
- Ordained by: David Konstant
- Date: 29 July 1995
Episcopal consecration
- Principal consecrator: Vincent Nichols
- Co-consecrators: John Sherrington, Nicholas Hudson
- Date: 25 January 2016
- Place: Westminster Cathedral

John Wilson (born 4 July 1968) is an English Catholic prelate serving as Archbishop of Southwark since 2019. He had previously served as an auxiliary bishop in the Archdiocese of Westminster from 2016 to 2019.

== Early life ==
Wilson was born on 4 July 1968 in Sheffield, West Riding of Yorkshire, England. Baptised into the Church of England, he converted to Roman Catholicism at the age of 16 in 1985. He studied at University of Leeds, where he studied for a bachelor's degree in theology and religious studies. He then undertook studies for the priesthood at the Venerable English College, Rome. During his seminary training he completed a Baccalaureate in Sacred Theology at the Pontifical Gregorian University and a Licence in Moral Theology at the Alphonsian Academy.

== Ordained ministry ==
Wilson was ordained to the priesthood on 29 July 1995 for the Diocese of Leeds. After doing pastoral work from 1995 to 1999, Wilson began teaching moral theology at St Cuthbert's Seminary, Ushaw College, Durham, in 1999, then latterly served as Vice-Rector; he also completed a PhD at Durham University. In 2005, he was appointed Episcopal Vicar for Evangelisation in the Diocese of Leeds, a role he held until 2012. From 2008 to 2014 he was also sessional chaplain at HMP Leeds. In 2011 he was named a Chaplain to His Holiness by Pope Benedict XVI. During the vacancy of the See, he was elected Administrator of the Diocese of Leeds by the College of Consultors from September 2012 to November 2014. From 2015 to 2016 he served as Parish Priest of St Martin de Porres, Wakefield.

=== Episcopate ===
On 24 November 2015 Wilson was appointed an Auxiliary bishop in the Archdiocese of Westminster and Titular Bishop of Lindisfarne by Pope Francis.

He was ordained to the episcopate by Cardinal Vincent Nichols on the Feast of the Conversion of St Paul, 25 January 2016. He had pastoral care of the deaneries in the western area of the diocese. He was also Chair of the Education Commission and had oversight of ecumenical work and inter-religious dialogue at diocesan level. He was also responsible for Liturgy, Art and Architecture, as well as the Historic Churches Commission.

On 10 June 2019 Wilson was appointed Archbishop of Southwark by Pope Francis upon the retirement of Archbishop Peter Smith. His installation took place in St George's Cathedral, Southwark, on 25 July 2019.

He was installed as the Grand Prior of the Lieutenancy of England and Wales of the Order of the Holy Sepulchre. in May 2021 and holds the rank of Knight Commander with Star.

Catholic Church titles
Preceded by Peter Smith	Archbishop of Southwark; 10 June 2019—present	Incumbent
