= Cyril Cowderoy =

British priest and bishop (1905–1976)

- Archbishop of Southwark
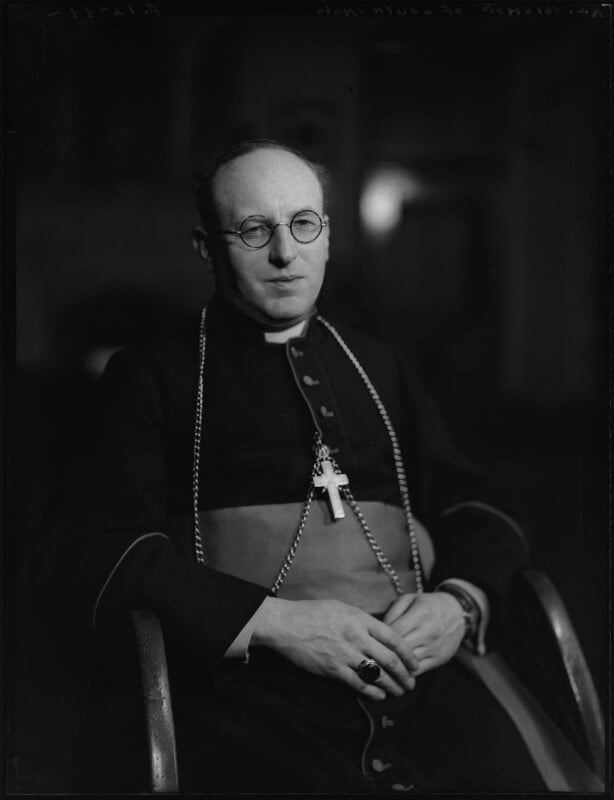
- Cowderoy in 1949
- Archdiocese: Southwark
- See: Southwark
- Appointed: 12 December 1949
- Installed: 21 December 1949
- Term ended: 10 October 1976
- Predecessor: Peter Emmanuel Amigo
- Successor: Michael George Bowen

Orders
- Ordination: 30 May 1931
- Consecration: 21 December 1949 by Bernard William Griffin

Personal details
- Born: 5 May 1905 Sidcup, Kent, England, United Kingdom
- Died: 10 October 1976 (aged 71)
- Denomination: Roman Catholic

Cyril Conrad Cowderoy (5 May 1905 – 10 October 1976) was a priest for over 45 years and a bishop for over 26 years in the Roman Catholic Church in England and Wales.

Cowderoy was born in Sidcup, Kent, on 5 May 1905 and ordained a priest in Southwark on 30 May 1931 by Peter Emmanuel Amigo.

== Priestly ministry ==
After study in Paris he returned to serve in the diocese first as a teacher and then as Bishop's secretary. He served as parish priest for a short time until he was appointed bishop in 1949 and consecrated by Cardinal Bernard William Griffin with George Beck (bishop) and Neil Farren as co-consecrators.

== Episcopal ministry ==
Southwark's Catholic cathedral was destroyed by in a 1941 bombing raid and so one of his immediate pastoral priorities was to re-construct the cathedral.

He attended all of the sessions of the Second Vatican Council. On 28 May 1965, aged 60, he was appointed as the first metropolitan Archbishop of Southwark by Pope Paul VI. On the same date a new diocese Roman Catholic Diocese of Arundel and Brighton was created by carving out a large southern portion of his diocese.

Recently-revealed archives show that in 1957 Cowderoy took a hardline approach from a Dutch priest and future Vatican Cardinal Johannes Willebrands to come and speak on ecumenism in his diocese: "I do not agree with it and I do not like it...if the Holy See leaves me to judge, I would say no".

In 1968, he took a hard line on the controversial papal encyclical Humanae Vitae and disciplined a young priest in his diocese and called the document on artificial birth control "regrettable". Cowderoy's position was in contrast to the more moderate approsach of his fellow London Archbishop, John Heenan.

He was Grand Prior for England and Wales of the Knights of the Order of the Holy Sepulchre of Jerusalem.

He died suddenly on 10 October 1976, aged 71, shortly after celebrating mass.

== Consecrator ==
Archbishop Cowderoy consecrated or co-consecrated the following bishops (all deceased):

- Bishop Bernard Patrick Wall
- Bishop Charles Joseph Henderson
- Bishop John Farmer Healy
- Bishop David John Cashman
- Bishop Langton Douglas Fox
- Bishop Alan Clark
