= Patrick Lynch (Roman Catholic bishop) =

Irish Catholic bishop in England

Patrick Kieran Lynch, SS.CC. (born 27 April 1947, Cork City, County Cork, Ireland) is a retired auxiliary bishop of the Roman Catholic Archdiocese of Southwark in England.

== Early life and priesthood ==
Lynch has two brothers and a sister. After leaving St. Fintan's High School in Dublin, he entered the novitiate of the Congregation of the Sacred Hearts of Jesus and Mary. He then studied theology in the United States of America, gaining a Master's Degree in 1971. He was ordained a priest on 21 July 1972. After ordination, he served in Peterborough and in Daventry, Northamptonshire. In 1984, he became director of the congregation's formation house in London. He became a parish priest in the Archdiocese of Westminster in 1987, before his election as provincial of the congregation in 1992. At the end of his term as provincial, during which he had travelled to Europe, Asia, Latin America and Africa, he was a parish priest at South Norwood in the Archdiocese of Southwark for several years before being appointed as a bishop.

== Episcopate ==
On 28 December 2005 Lynch was appointed auxiliary bishop for the Archdiocese of Southwark and titular bishop of Castrum. He was ordained a bishop on 14 February 2006. The principal consecrator was the archdiocese's ordinary of that time, Archbishop Kevin McDonald; his principal co-consecrators were Auxiliary Bishop John Hine and McDonald's predecessor, Archbishop Michael Bowen. He had responsibility for the South East pastoral area of the diocese, which comprises the deaneries of Bexley, Bromley, Camberwell, Greenwich, Lambeth and Lewisham.

Lynch was the main celebrant at the funeral mass for Lee Rigby, the victim of the 2013 Woolwich attack, which was attended by Anglican Bishop of Woolwich Michael Ipgrave.

The Press Office of the Holy See announced on 28 November 2020 that Pope Francis had accepted his resignation.
