= St Joseph's Convent, Taunton =

Complex of buildings in Taunton, England

St Joseph's Convent
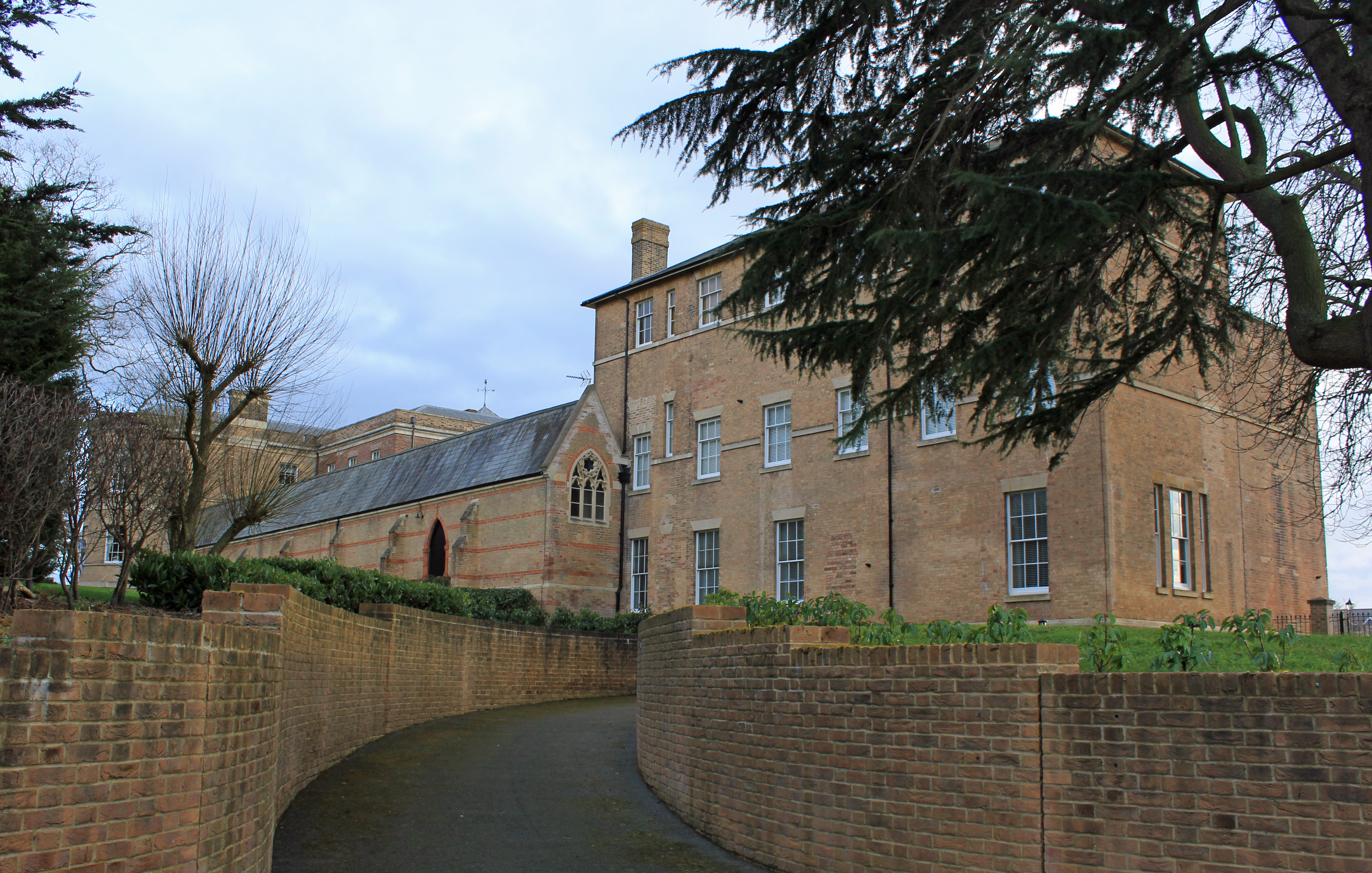
- North-west end, pictured in 2015.

- Location within Somerset
- Former names: Taunton Lodge, Franciscan Convent

General information
- Architectural style: Gothic
- Location: Taunton, Somerset, United Kingdom
- Coordinates: 51.0115°N 3.0956°W
- Construction started: 1772
- Renovated: 1807–12

Listed Building – Grade II*
- Official name: St Joseph's Convent
- Designated: 4 July 1975
- Reference no.: 1276422

Listed Building – Grade II
- Official name: Stone walls to grounds of St Joseph's Convent
- Designated: 4 July 1975
- Reference no.: 1276403

St Joseph's Convent is a complex of 18th- and 19th-century buildings in Taunton, Somerset. They were primarily used as a Roman Catholic convent. First by the Franciscans and then Sisters of St. Joseph of Annecy. The buildings were sold out of the Catholic church in 1976, and were redeveloped as residential flats in 2005. The main building is designated by English Heritage as a Grade II* listed building, while the boundary walls on the west side are Grade II listed.

The main building was begun in 1772, as a free hospital for the poor, but funding ran out two years later, and it was completed as a private residence. In the early 19th century, it was bought by a group of Franciscan nuns, who moved from an unsatisfactory site in Winchester. The nuns carried out a number of additions and extensions to the building to make it more suitable for their needs. They moved out of Taunton in 1950 and sold the convent to the Sisters of St. Joseph, who continued to run a school on the site for the next twenty-six years.

== History ==
Originally, the site was intended to be a hospital. On the first stone that was laid in September 1772, the engraving describes the building as "a general hospital, for the relief of the sick poor." That foundation stone was laid by Frederick North, Lord North, the British Prime Minister at the time. In 1774, the building work stopped when funds ran out, and shortly after it was sold to recover the debts incurred from building it. The building was eventually completed as a personal residence, and came into the hands of James Coles. Upon his death, the house, known as Taunton Lodge, was put up for sale. This was brought to the attention of a group of Franciscan nuns. The nuns had left Bruges in Belgium, and arrived in England in 1794 to avoid persecution during the French Revolution. They initially settled in Winchester, but the buildings they utilised there were not suitable for their permanent use, and in October 1806, they were ordered to look for somewhere else to establish themselves.

Mr Knight of Cannington alerted the nuns to the sale of Taunton Lodge, and they raised the £3,150 required to purchase it. They completed the purchase in early May 1807, after some minor quibbles with the Coles family. When the abbess visited the Lodge prior to the purchase, she had identified that it would require £1,000 worth of improvements in addition to the money already spent on its acquisition. The plans included extending the existing building to gain a staircase and some dormitories for the school girls, and the addition of a new wing that would include a chapel, infirmary, four cells, and rooms for the male chaplain and servants. The new building was begun in March 1808, and by June of that year, the entire community had moved from Winchester, despite the work being ongoing. The shell of the new body was completed by the autumn of 1808, but the work was delayed due to a lack of finances as £1,908 had already been spent on altering the old building. This cost did not include the erection of the new wing, thus the constructions costs were already far surpassing the original estimate.

Within two years of being built, the roof on the new wing had to be replaced as it had started sinking; the joists "were made of bad wood & put in the wrong way". It was too close to winter in 1810 for the work to be completed that year, and it had to be left until the following spring. The wing was completed, with replacement roof, by January 1812, at a total cost of just over £2,230. A storm in 1818 damaged the roof in the original building, and on inspection it was found that the whole roof should be replaced; this was completed by September of the same year.

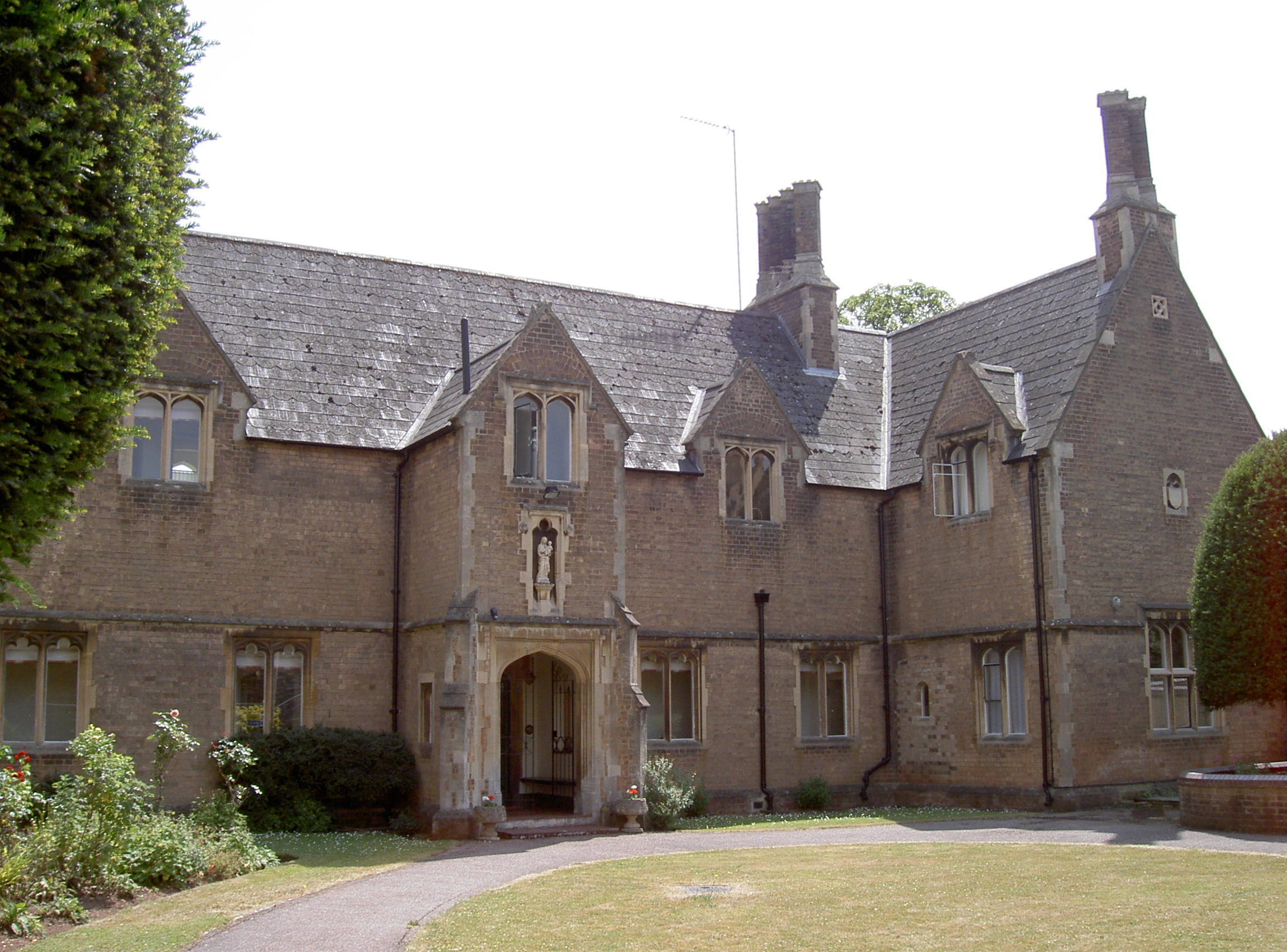
St George's Rectory on land donated by the convent in 1858

The convent continued to be significantly expanded over the next twenty years, and in 1858 the Franciscans purchased a plot of land adjacent to the convent for the erection of a church, rectory and school. This was gifted to the local Bishop, and St George's Church was opened on the site two years later.

In 1950, the Franciscans sold the convent buildings to the Sisters of St. Joseph of Annecy. The latter had been in Taunton since the 1920s, running St George's School, and upon purchasing the convent, set up St Joseph's Convent School, which catered for boys and girls up to the age of 11, and girls on to 18. That school continued to operate until 1976, when the property was bought by the nearby King's College, who used it as accommodation for their boarding students. In 2005, the building complex was converted to "high quality" residential flats.

=== 1809 miracle ===
In March 1809 a miracle was reported as occurring at the convent. It is recorded that one of the nuns, Sister Mary Ann Wood, sustained a deep cut across her arm while opening a sash window. She was attended by a local surgeon, who judged that the muscles, and most of the tendons had been severed. The wound healed over after three weeks, but she continued to suffer sharp pain for four months. During all this time, she was not able to use her hand or arm, and despite attempting a variety of different methods to repair the broken tendons, the doctor eventually declared that she may regain use of her forefinger and thumb, but not the rest of her fingers. By this time, her arm and hand had withered, and Sister Mary Ann decided to make a novena (nine prayers) to Saint Winifred. She began her prayers on 6 August, and placed a piece of moss on her arm; she said that she felt intense pain, and considered removing the moss, but opted not to. The following morning, she awoke, and her hand and arm were returned to full strength. The surgeon who had been tending to her was said to have "at first declared the case a miracle; but human respect prevented him from publicly attesting it." The Right Reverend Peter Collingridge, Vicar Apostolic of the Western District, after consulting a Catholic surgeon in London, declared "that the cure was supernatural and an evident miracle."

=== 1851 case of Augusta Talbot ===
In 1851, the House of Commons was petitioned by Craven Berkeley, who had previously sat as the member of parliament for Cheltenham. He claimed that his step-daughter, Augusta Talbot, had been forced to join the Franciscan Convent in Taunton as a postulant (the first stage to become a nun), rather than a pupil. Her father had died in 1839 and then her mother, after remarrying, died in 1841, and with the subsequent death of her brother, she was due to inherit £80,000. After the death of her mother, Talbot had been placed in the care of Francis Talbot, 5th Earl of Shrewsbury, her father's half-brother. Berkeley alleged that the Shrewsburys first attempted to marry her to François VII de La Rochefoucauld, and then when she refused, placed her at the Taunton convent against her will. The allegation followed that when Talbot became a nun, her inheritance, which was due to her in June 1852, would become property of the convent, or the greater Catholic church. Berkeley also protested that he and his daughter were not allowed to communicate with Talbot, though Thomas Wilde, 1st Baron Truro, the Lord Chancellor, noted that Berkeley had not tried to see Talbot for nine years. Lord Truro contacted Talbot, who stated that she was not a postulant, and she was amenable to his plans to remove her from the convent and place her in the care of a new guardian in London. He duly did so, and rejected Berkeley's petition, upon the basis of his previous lack of contact with Talbot.

== Architecture ==
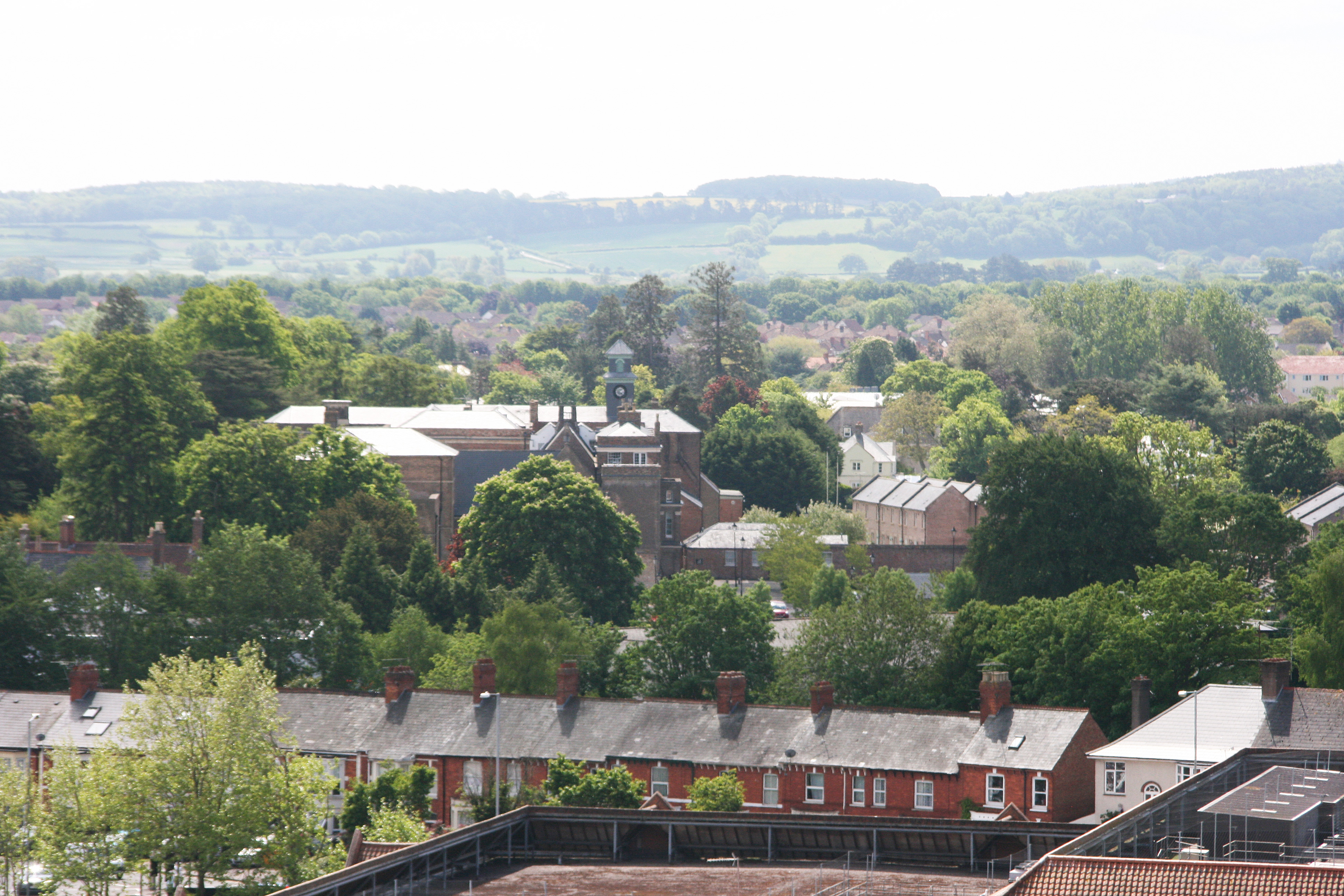
The buildings

The main building is a symmetrical three-storey house built of red brick, with a yellow brick central range which was added later. The building has a cornice and parapet, and a bowed end which projects to the east. On the south side, there is an additional attic storey. The house retains its original sash windows, and on the first floor some of the windows have wrought-iron balconettes. An addition to the building has been made in the south-west, including an arcade on the ground floor, and a bell tower. Further additions were made to the main building in the 19th century, including a Gothic chapel of red brick with ashlar dressings to the north. There are later buildings on either side of the chapel: to the west is a 19th-century building with a two-storey entrance porch, while a Gothic cloister, comprising two walks with scissor-trussed timber roofs, lies to the east. There is a further extension to the south, which is not part of the Grade II* listing.

A summerhouse was added to the grounds, probably alongside the 19th-century additions to the main building. It was constructed of red and white brick, and had a steep slate roof. The east side displayed a crucifix. The building was Grade II listed in July 1975, but has since been demolished. The stone walls around the site are Grade II listed where they are the original "high stone rubble wall with brick capping"; in other places they have been renovated in newer red brick.

== Bibliography ==
- Trappes-Lomax, Richard (1922). The English Franciscan Nuns, 1619–1821, and The Friars Minor of the same province, 1618–1761. London: Catholic Record Society. OCLC 13574869.
