= St George's Cathedral, Southwark =

Coordinates: 51°29′52″N 0°06′28″W

- Metropolitan Cathedral Church of St George
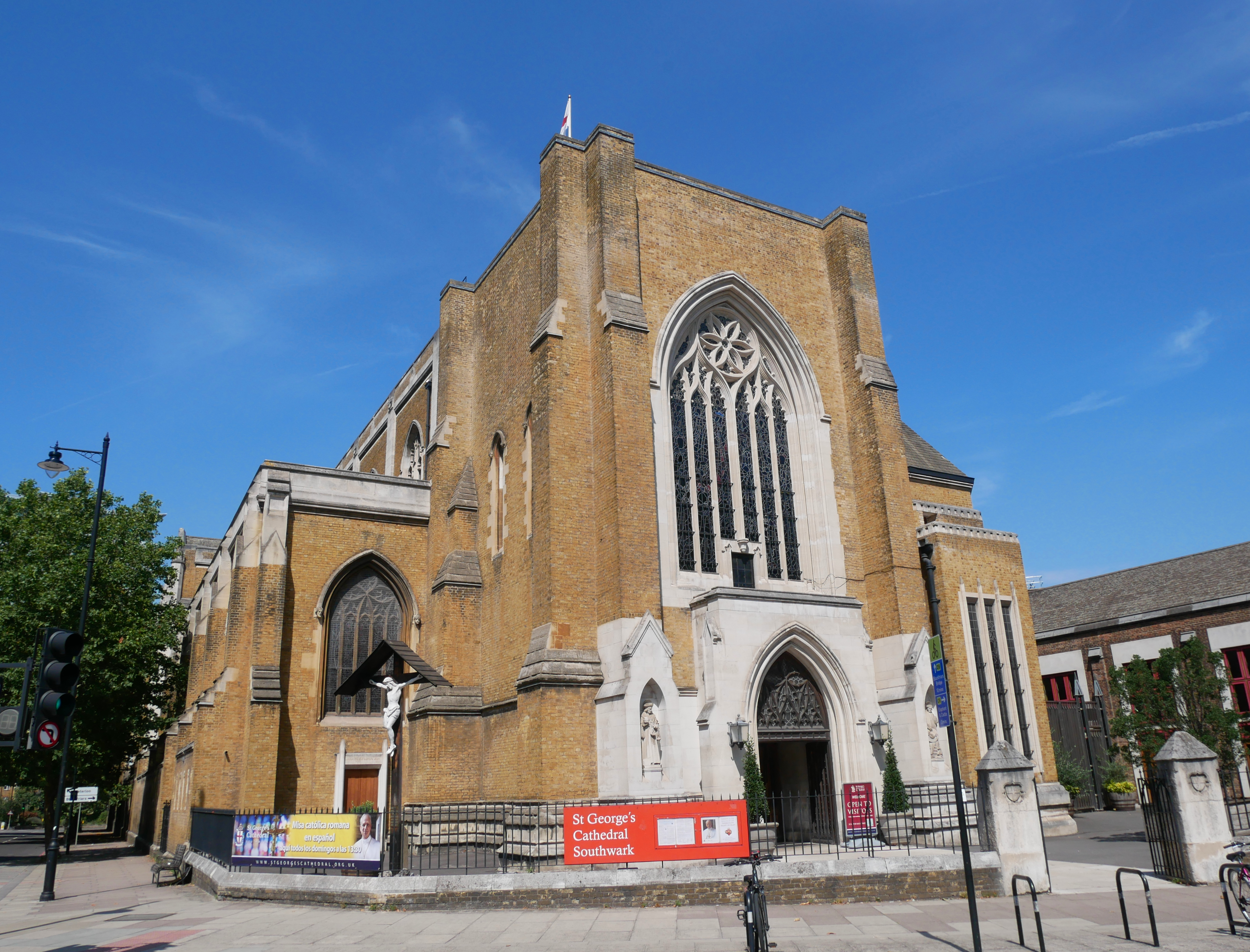

- Shown within Central London
- OS grid reference: TQ 31437 79357
- Location: Southwark, Greater London
- Country: England
- Denomination: Roman Catholic
- Tradition: Latin Rite
- Website: www.stgeorgescathedral.org.uk

History
- Status: Cathedral
- Consecrated: 1894

Architecture
- Functional status: Active
- Architect: Augustus Welby Northmore Pugin
- Style: Gothic Revival

Administration
- Province: Southwark
- Archdiocese: Southwark

Clergy
- Archbishop: Most Rev. John Wilson
- Dean: Canon Michael Branch

Listed Building – Grade II
- Designated: 2 March 1950
- Reference no.: 1385643

The Metropolitan Cathedral Church of St George, usually known as St George's Cathedral, Southwark, is the cathedral of the Roman Catholic Archdiocese of Southwark, south London, and is the seat of the Archbishop of Southwark.

The cathedral is the mother church of the Roman Catholic Province of Southwark which covers the Archdiocese of Southwark (all of London south of the River Thames including Kent and north Surrey) and the dioceses of Arundel and Brighton, Portsmouth, and Plymouth. It is the metropolitan cathedral of the Archbishop of Southwark. The building was erected in 1848 and reopened after extensive war damage in 1958. It is architecturally listed in the initial category of Grade II.

The cathedral is opposite the Imperial War Museum on Lambeth Road in London (on the corner with St George's Road). On Westminster Bridge Road, close by to the north, is its eponymous Primary School and the headquarters of CAFOD.

== History ==
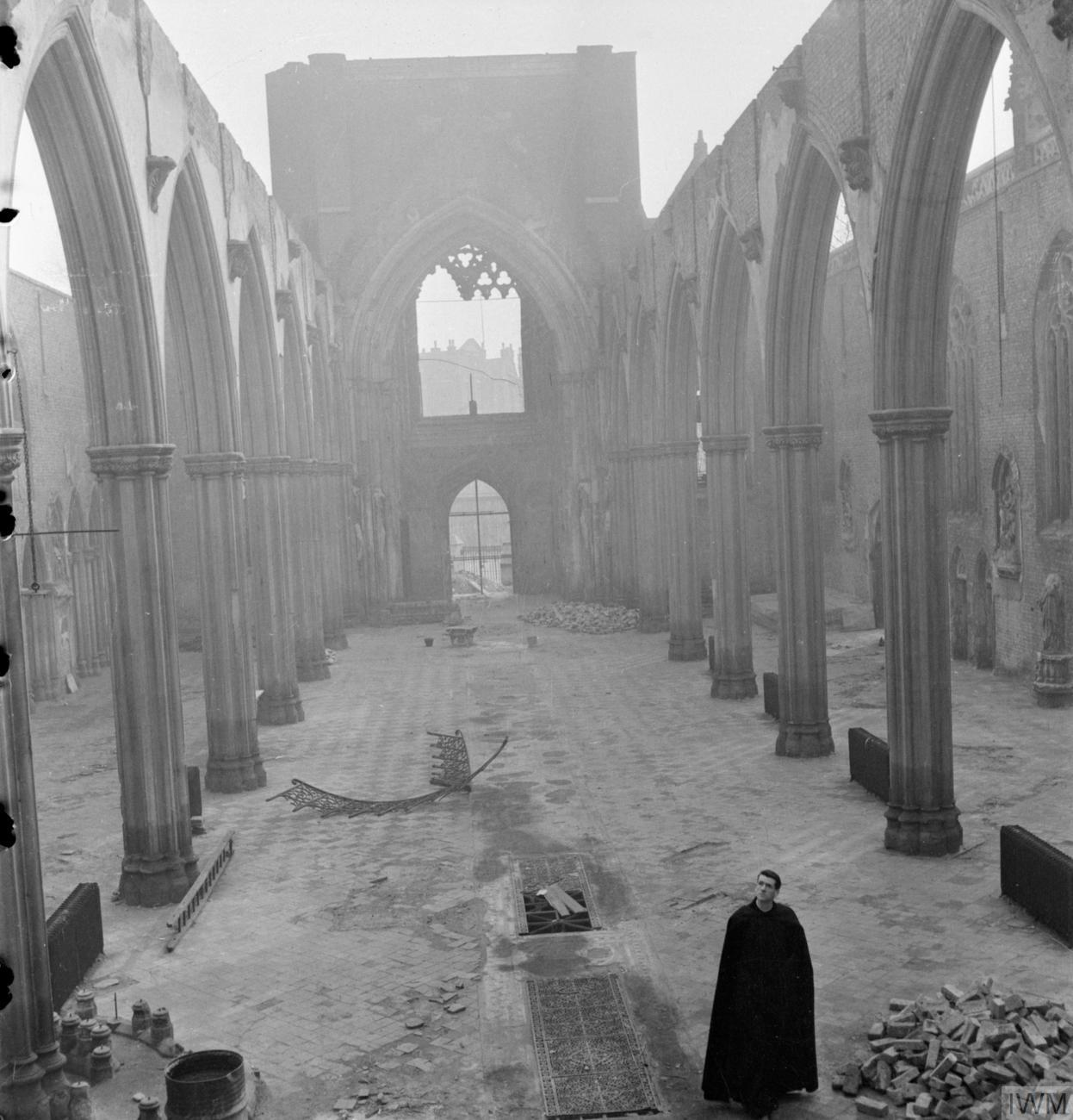
Catholic priest Father Dixon walks through the cathedral in 1942, after extensive damage was caused by incendiary bombing

St George's was built in 1848, when it was opened by Bishop (later Cardinal) Wiseman. Previously, the local Catholic community had used a small chapel on London Road, also dedicated to St George, but the arrival of Irish immigrants in the area necessitated the construction of a larger house of worship. In 1852, following the restoration of the Catholic hierarchy, it became one of the first four Catholic churches in England and Wales (and the first in London) raised to cathedral status since the English Reformation. It was designed by Augustus Pugin, famous for his work with Charles Barry on the design of the rebuilt Houses of Parliament, in decorated Gothic, from yellow stock brick with Portland stone dressings. Pugin was the first person to be married in the church on 10 August 1848, to his third wife Jane.

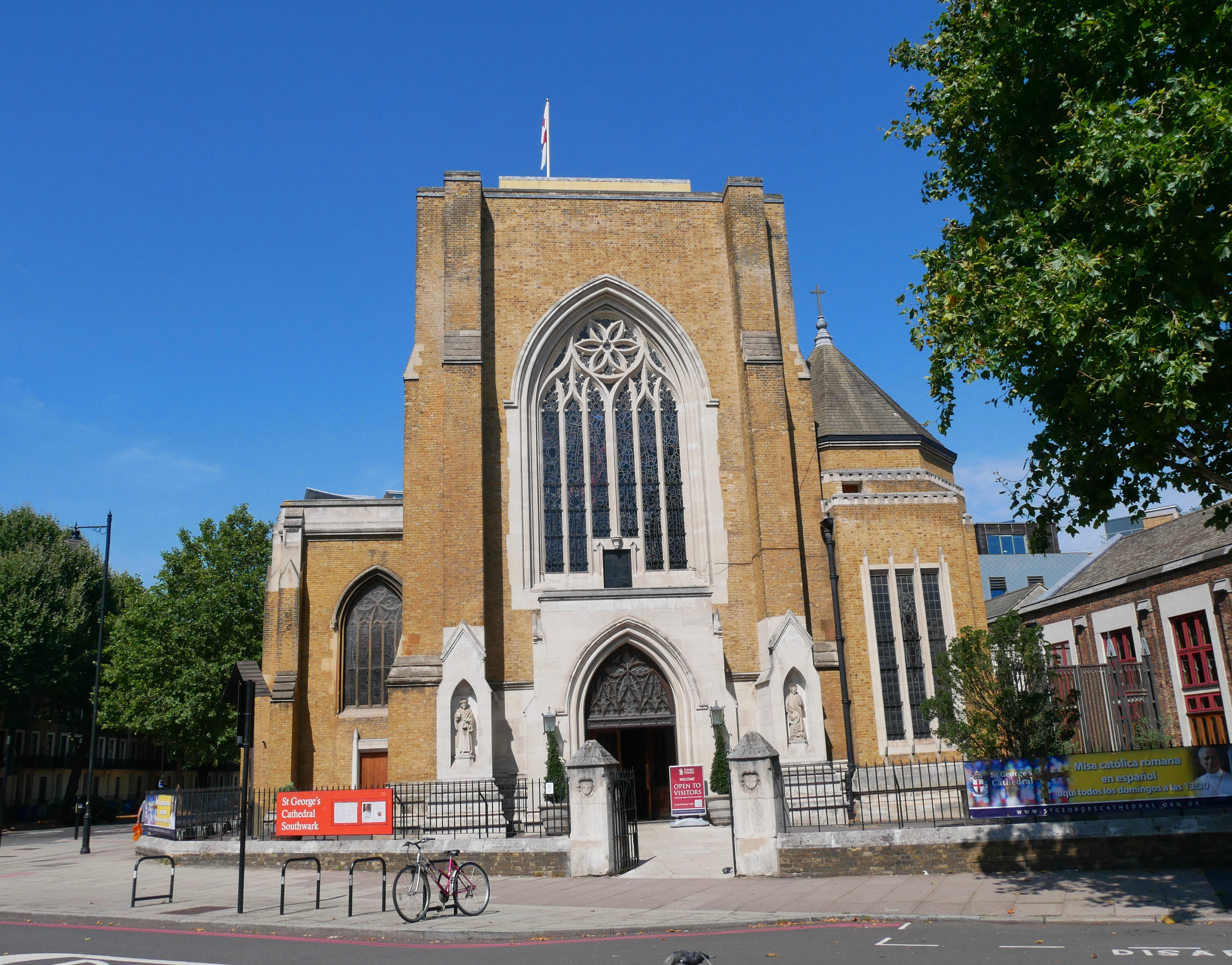
Southeast face of the cathedral

St George's was restored and redecorated by the Scottish ecclesiastical architect Frederick Walters between 1888 and 1905.

In October 1920 St George's was the site of the funeral Mass of Irish nationalist Terence MacSwiney, Lord Mayor of Cork, who died on hunger strike in Brixton Prison. John Lavery painted a well-known painting of the funeral, which is in the collection of the Crawford Art Gallery in Cork.

The cathedral was badly bombed during the Second World War, following which the adjacent Amigo Hall served as the pro-cathedral. Within the external structure of Pugin's building, Romilly Craze designed a rebuilt 20th-century Gothic revival cathedral, which was opened in 1958. The surviving elements of the bombed cathedral were the two chantries and the Blessed Sacrament Chapel, which had been designed by Pugin's son Edward in 1856.

Pugin's original design include taller towers and a spire. Neither when built nor when rebuilt was there sufficient funding, and these elements remain unrealised.

Since the reconstruction it has resumed its role as a focal point in the local community and has played host to many notable visitors, including the Dalai Lama (1998) and Pope John Paul II (1982), the latter being depicted in one of the cathedral's stained-glass windows by Goddard & Gibbs.

== Features ==
Before the wartime damage, there were two organs, one by Willis and one by Bishop & Son. Both were destroyed. They were replaced by a 72-stop John Compton organ in 1958. The Compton organ has since been modified by both Ellis Scothon and by Whitwell Green.

Easter 2011 saw the partial restoration of the Compton organ and the installation in the chancel of the George Pace Choir Stalls, a gift from the Anglican St Alban's Cathedral. The cathedral has strong links with both the Paderborn Cathedral, North Rhine-Westphalia, which had suffered bombing by the British in the Second World War, and Southwark Cathedral, the local Anglican cathedral.

The stained glass in the bombed cathedral was by the prolific stained glass artist William Wailes. In the rebuilt cathedral, the window above the West Door shows the Coronation of Mary as Queen of Heaven. The East Window depicts the Crucifixion and Saints of England and Wales. Both East and West windows are by Harry Clarke of Dublin; the stone tracery in the East Window is Pugin's.

A more recent feature is the installation of a cross by the Salvadoran artist Fernando Llort in 2013, as a national shrine to the murdered Archbishop of San Salvador Óscar Romero.

== Choirs and music ==
The cathedral choirs have constantly performed at various events since 1848, and their performances have been broadcast on BBC Radio and TV, such as Christmas Midnight Mass in 2015 on BBC1.

== Today ==
The cathedral is a working church for the community. For example, the Latin American community is served with a Spanish-language Mass every Sunday at 1 pm. Every Mass is attended by people of different ethnicities and ages, ranging from African to Asian to European. The Latin Mass Society of England and Wales have made several visits to the cathedral to celebrate both Low Mass and Solemn High Mass in the usus antiquior (older use) that Pope Benedict XVI's motu proprio Summorum Pontificum (2007) authorised as an extraordinary form of the Roman Rite (the 1962 version of the Tridentine Mass).

The cathedral is located on a historic site next to Wellington Mills housing estate and close to the Imperial War Museum, and a few minutes' walk from London's South Bank and the Thames, Westminster Bridge, the London Eye, and landmarks such as St Thomas' Hospital and Waterloo station. Each summer it is used by London South Bank University for its graduation ceremonies. It is also frequently used for the convocations of the Academy of Saint Cecilia. The acoustics attract many orchestras and choirs to perform concerts in the nave, and the Whitehall Orchestra and Trinity College of Music are frequent visitors.

== Gallery ==
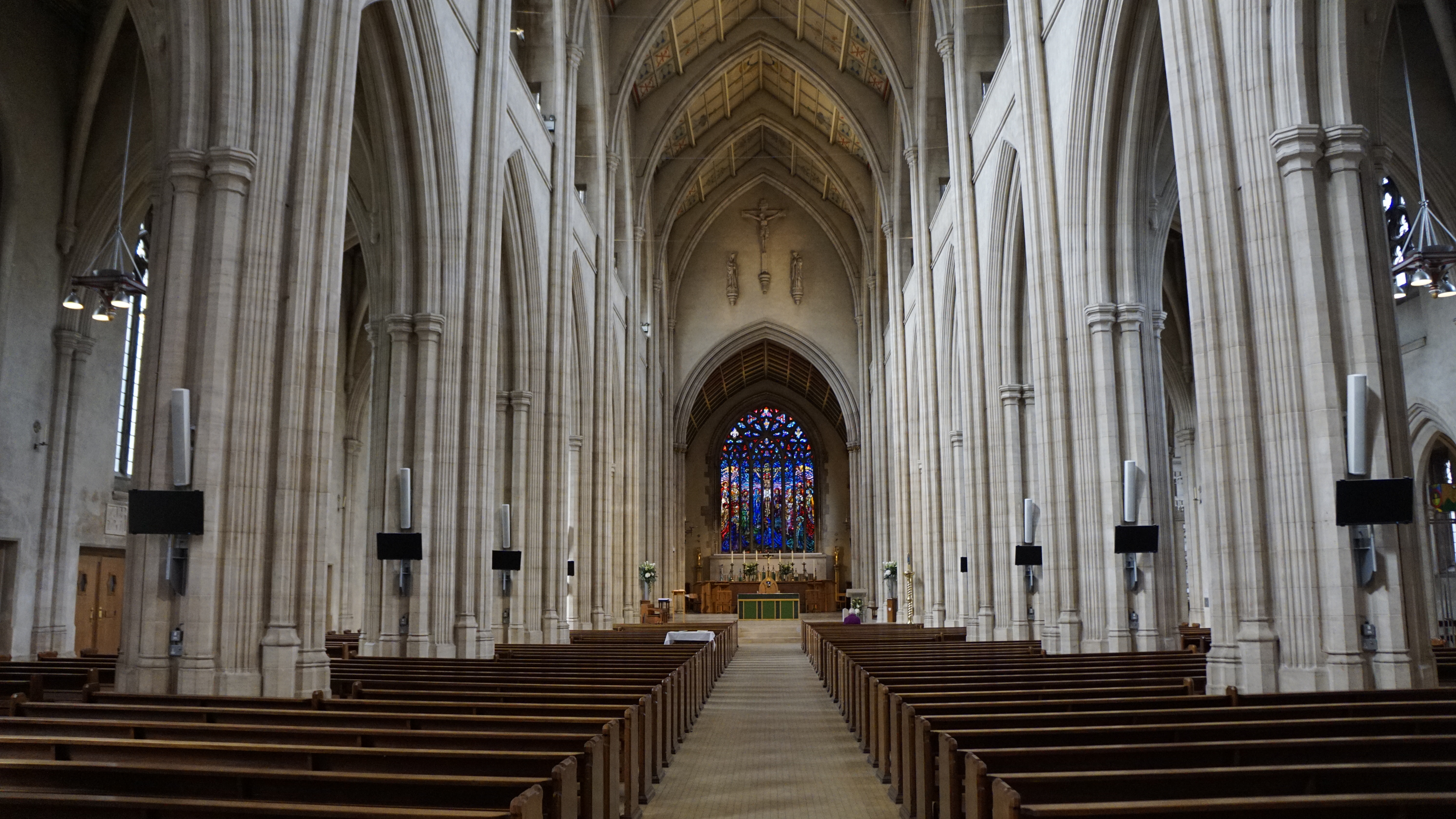
Nave

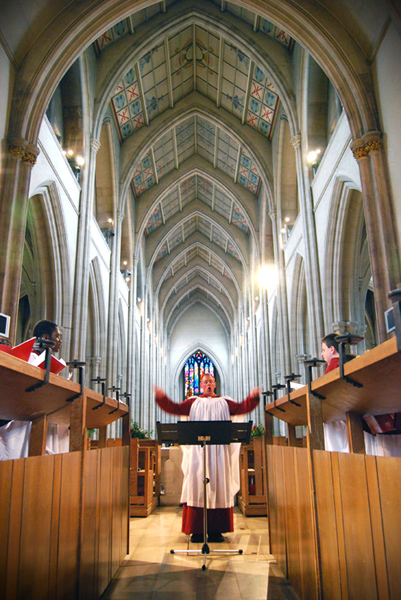
A view of the George Pace Choir Stalls and the Nave

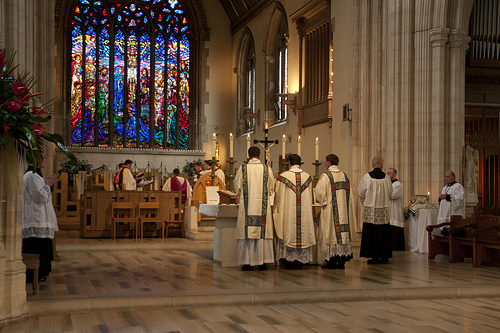
Solemn High Mass in the Extraordinary Form

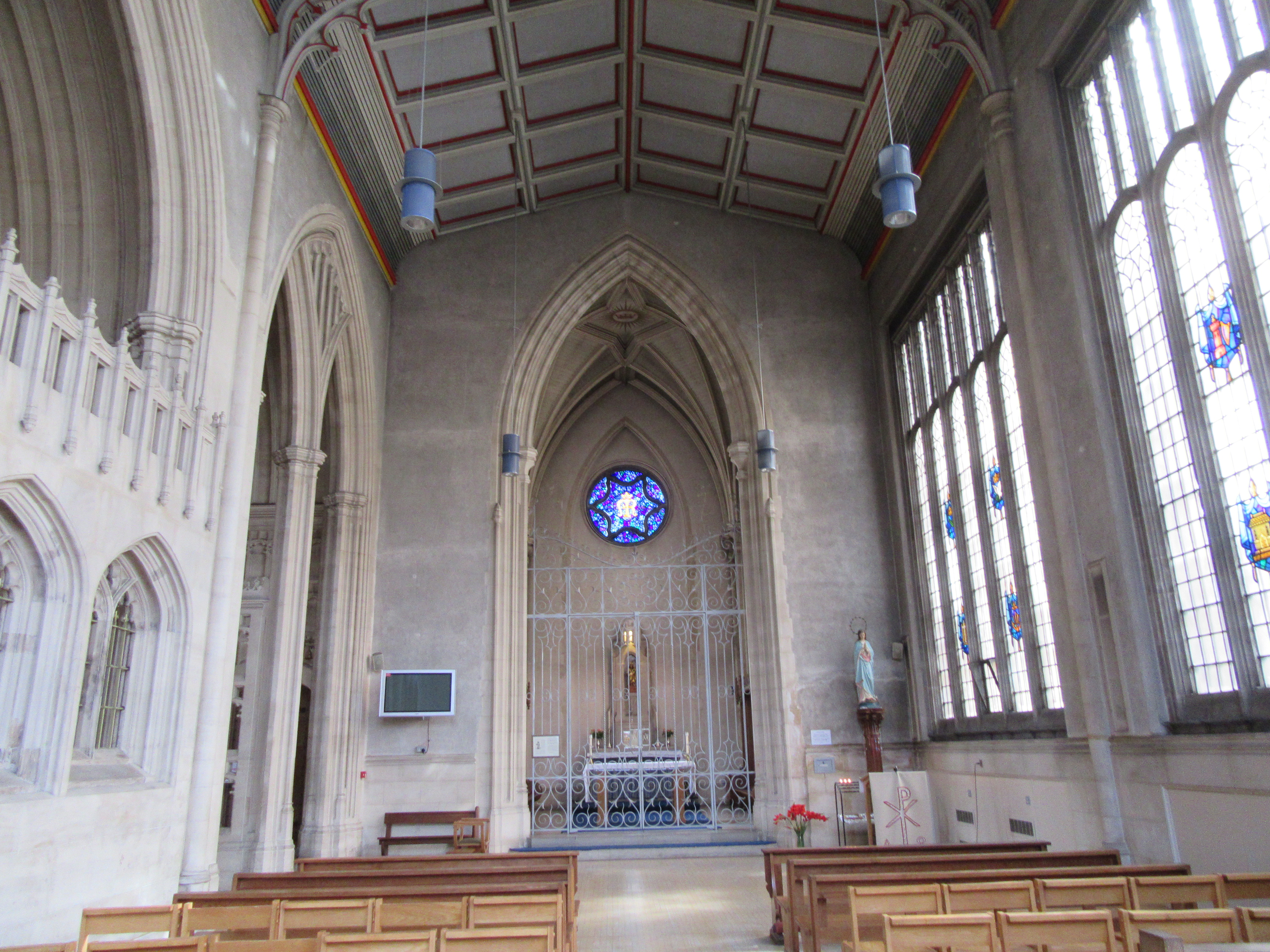
Interior

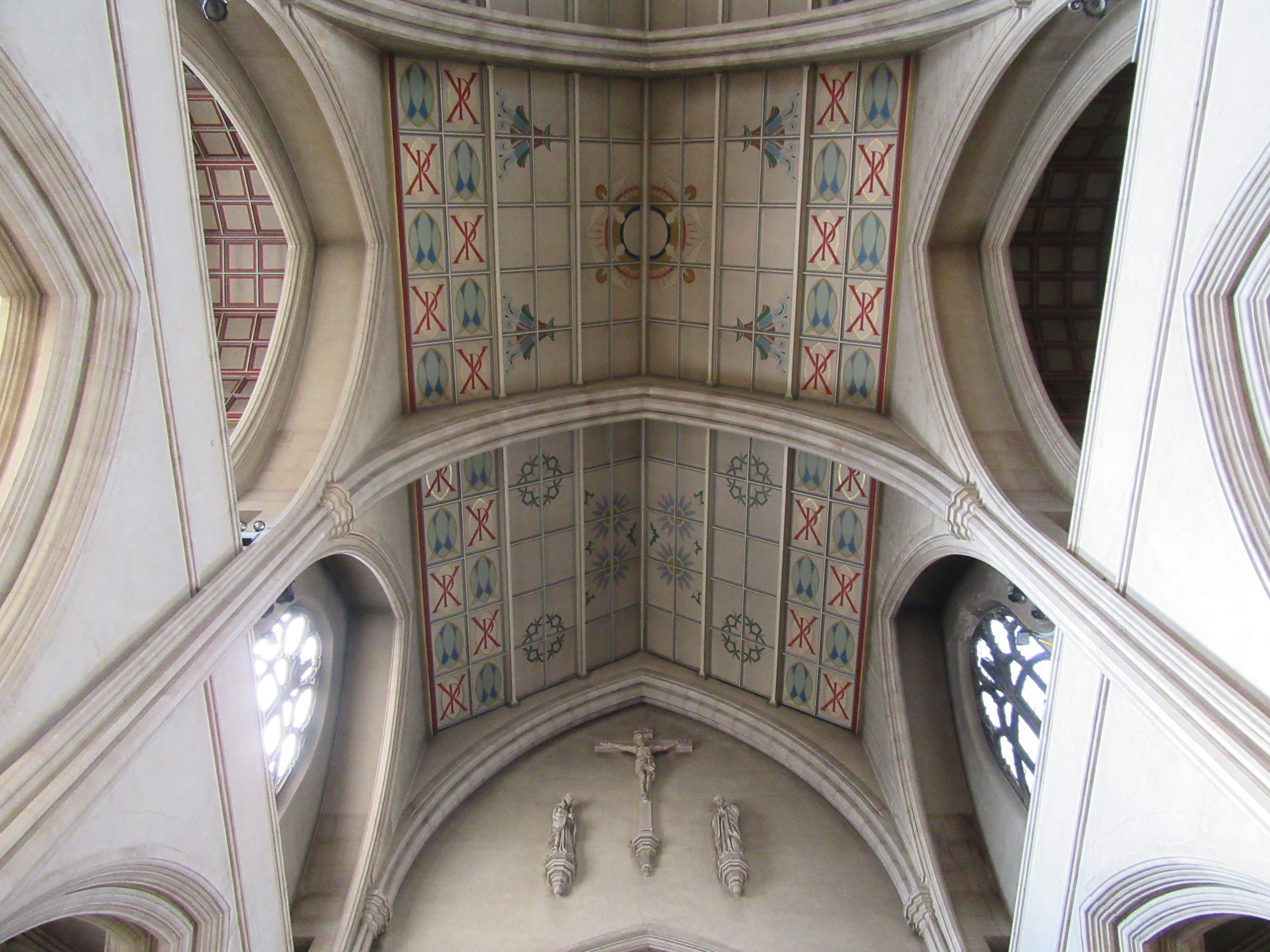
Ceiling

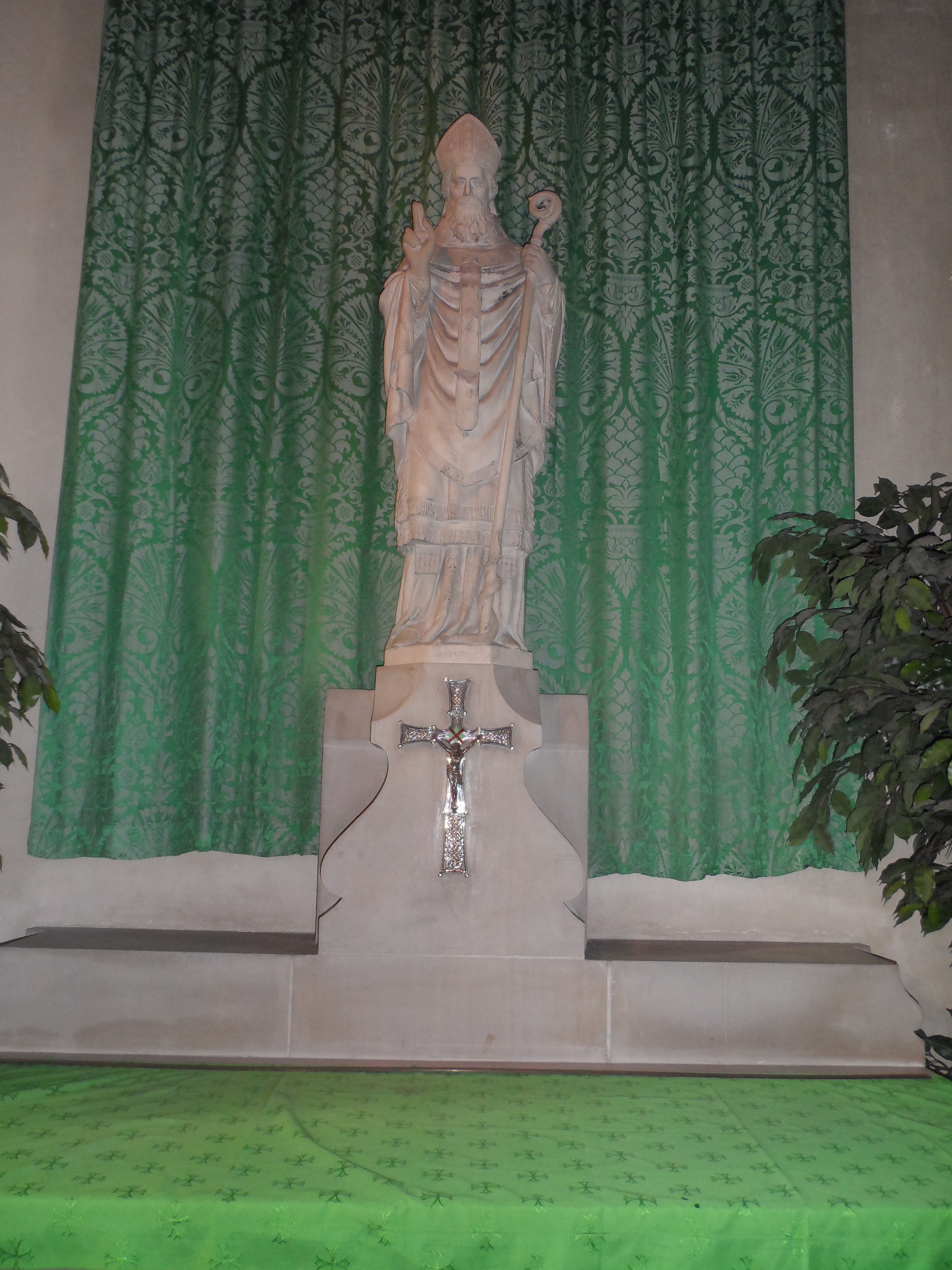
Statue of St Patrick

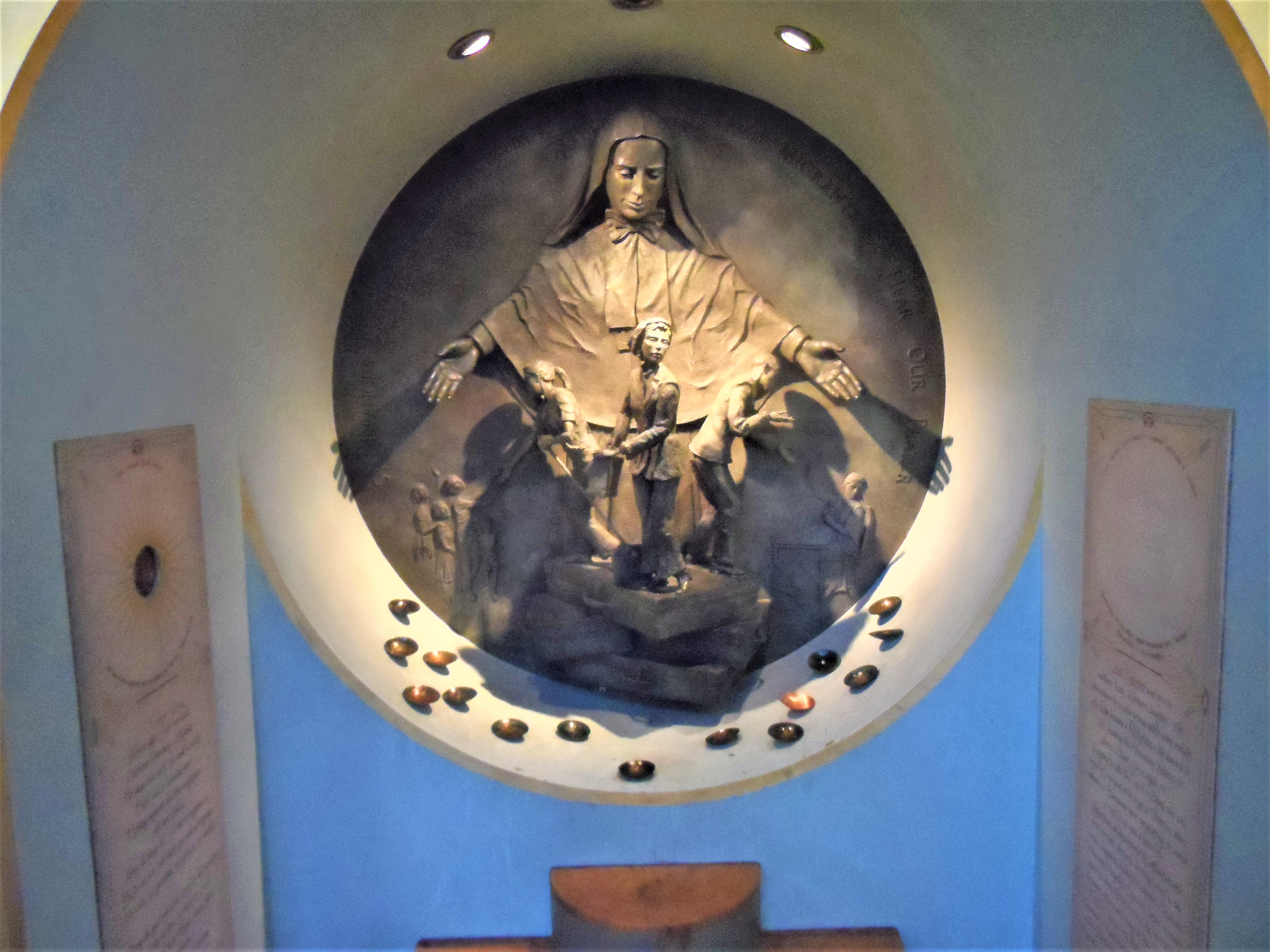
Shrine of Frances Xavier Cabrini, patron saint of migrants

== See also ==
- Saint George: Devotions, traditions and prayers
- List of churches and cathedrals of London
