= Charles Henderson (bishop) =

Irish-born UK Roman Catholic bishop

Charles Joseph Henderson, KC*HS was born in County Waterford, Ireland on 14 April 1924, where he was ordained as a priest on 6 June 1948. He was educated locally by the Christian Brothers and trained for the priesthood in St. John's College, Waterford.

Based in England, Henderson was appointed vicar general of the new diocese Diocese of Arundel and Brighton, which was created out of Southwark in 1965. He was made a papal chamberlain in 1960 and a prelate to the papal household in 1965. In 1969 he was appointed as the parish priest of Our Lady Help of Christians Church, Blackheath.

On 8 December 1972 at St George's Cathedral (Southwark), Archbishop Cyril Cowderoy ordained him as an auxiliary bishop in Southwark and titular Bishop of Tricala. After the death of Archbishop Cowderoy in October 1976, he was put in charge of the diocese until the installation of Archbishop Michael Bowen in April 1977. In 1980 he was given responsibility for south-east London.

== Ecumenism ==
In 1976, he was appointed to the Ecumenical Commission for England and Wales. He was a member of the English Anglican/RC Committee (ARCIC) from 1982 to 1992, and a member of the Methodist/RC Committee from 1983 to 1992. Between 1982 and 1986 he served as a Catholic consultor and observer at the British Council of Churches.

Pope John Paul II recognised his expertise and knowledge in inter-faith dialogue by appointing him to the Pontifical Council for Interreligious Dialogue in 1990. He was also chairman of the Bishops' Committee for Catholic to Jewish Relations from 1992 to 2001, vice-chairman of the Council for Christians and Jews for many years, and a member of the Churches' Commission for Interfaith Relations (1994–2002). In 2001 he was awarded the Interfaith Gold Medallion from the Sternberg Charitable Foundation. He was also chairman of the finance advisory committee of the UK's National Catholic Fund (1988–2000).

== Resignation/Honours ==
On 26 January 2001, Pope John Paul II accepted his official resignation.

In 1973 he was given the Freedom of the City of Waterford (an honour also shared by Isaac Butt and Anna Manahan). The same year, he was also made a Knight Commander with Star of the Equestrian Order of the Holy Sepulchre of Jerusalem.

He continued to travel for many years to Thailand several times to visit the Pattaya Orphanage Trust (of which he was a patron). He also frequently visited his native Waterford, Ireland, at least twice a year.

== Quote ==
In 1998, he remarked: "We have achieved in my lifetime as a bishop the undoing of the damage of the Reformation."

== Death ==
Diagnosed with cancer, he died on 10 April 2006, aged 81, at Park House, Blackheath.
