= Joseph Rathborne =

English Roman Catholic priest (1807-1842)

Joseph Rathborne (11 May 1807, Lincoln, England – 12 August 1842, Cowes) was an English Roman Catholic priest and controversialist.

== Works ==
As "Alethphilos" Rathborne published:

- Letters of Alethphilos (1839), on a controversy about prayers for the dead
- Good Friday and Easter Sunday (1839)
- Letters to the Protestants of the Isle of Wight on the Catholic Religion (1839)
- A Reply to the Reverend Barnabas Rodriguez Almeda (1840)
- A Letter to Dr. Adams, shewing Purgatory inseparably connected with Prayers for the Dead (1840)
- Are the Puseyites sincere? (1841); and
- The Church in its Relations with Truth and the State (1841), reply to William Ewart Gladstone.

Under his own name Rathborne published The Clergy of the French Revolution, an obituary sermon on Richard Caesar de Grenthe.

Attribution
