= William Wardell =

Australian civil engineer and architect

William W. Wardell
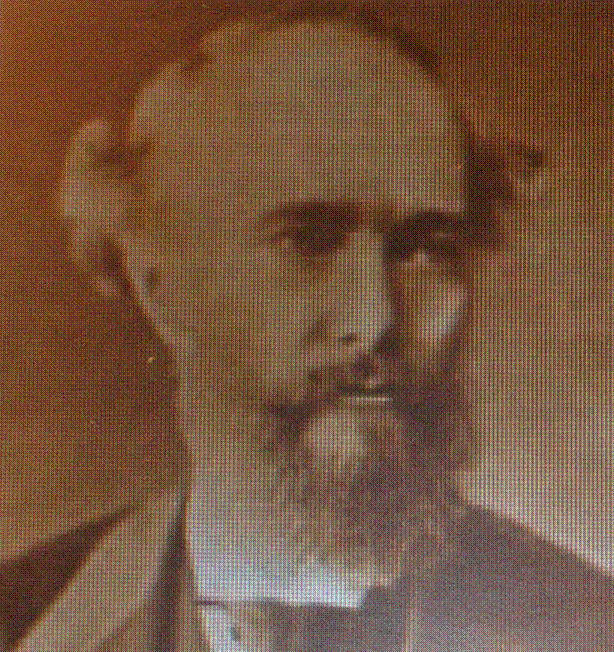
- Born: 1823; Poplar, London
- Died: 18 November 1899 (aged 75–76); North Sydney
- Burial place: Gore Hill Cemetery
- Occupations: Civil engineer and architect
- Years active: 1846 – 1858 (England); 1858 – 1878 (Melbourne); 1878 – c. 1890s (Sydney)
- Notable work: Our Ladye Star of the Sea, Greenwich; St Patrick's Cathedral, Melbourne; Government House, Melbourne; St John's College, University of Sydney; St Mary's Cathedral, Sydney; ASN Co building
- Movement: Gothic Revival architecture
- Spouse: Lucy Ann Butler
- Children: 11

William Wilkinson Wardell (1823–1899) was a noted architect who practiced in the second half of the 19th century, and is best known for a series of landmark Australian buildings in Melbourne and Sydney.

Following a successful career in the 1840-50s as an ecclesiastical architect for the Catholic church in Britain, Wardell emigrated to the Colony of Victoria in 1858. He then designed the Catholic cathedrals in both the major cities, St Patrick's in Melbourne and St Mary's in Sydney, as well as St John's College, at the University of Sydney, and numerous parish churches in Victoria. His Gothic Revival church designs have been compared favourably with his friend, English architect and Gothic pioneer Augustus Pugin. He also served as the Chief Architect of the Victorian Public Works Department from 1858-1878, personally designing Government House, Melbourne, and ensured refined classicalism was the predominant style for most public buildings. Wardell also maintained a private practice, designing a mansion, and a series of banks for the ES&A, most notably the Gothic Bank in Melbourne.

== Early life in London ==
Wardell was born in 1823, the son of Thomas Wardell, baker, and his wife Mary; his birth date is not recorded, but he was baptised the following year, on 3 March 1824 at All Saints Church of England, Poplar. He was educated as an engineer, and spent a short time at sea before practicing in London, working for the commissioners of sewers for Westminster and part of Middlesex, and for W. F. East, an architect. While employed on railway surveys in the early 1840s he studied near-by churches.

His interest in Gothic Revival architecture was stimulated by his friends, architect Augustus Pugin, and John Henry Newman, who encouraged him to become a Roman Catholic. Pugin became his friend and mentor, and was to inspire him not only in architecture but also in his religious convictions. Mixing in the artistic and literary circles of London, he fell in with the philosophy of the Oxford movement, which taught (amongst other things) that Gothic architecture, as symbolized by the great medieval cathedrals of England, was the only form of architecture worthy of God and fostered a spirituality that made it easier to communicate with God. In 1843 Wardell made the unusual decision to convert from Anglicanism to Roman Catholicism, adopting the motto Inveni Quod Quaesivi ("I have found that which I sought"). While Catholics were not actively persecuted in Britain at the time, there was still open discrimination against the Faith in certain political and business quarters. Newman himself did not himself make the leap of faith until 1845.

This manifested in his architectural interests, directed towards the revival of the Gothic of England's medieval period, and or the remainder of his life he saw architecture as a means of praising God. He always had a room in his home set aside as a chapel, dominated by an ancient carved wooden French cross, which he visited several times during the course of a day;iIt is thought that he frequently prayed before working on plans of church buildings.

The lifting of most restrictions on Catholics, which had prevailed since the time of the reformation, through the Catholic Emancipation Acts led to a Catholic revival in Britain. Thus the newly converted Pugin and his protégé Wardell were well placed to receive the numerous commissions which came flooding in.

On 7 October 1847 Wardell married Lucy Ann Butler, the daughter of William Henry Butler, a wine merchant and one time Mayor of Oxford. The couple married at St Mary's Catholic Church, Moorfields in the City of London and are known to have had eleven children.

== Architectural career ==
=== London office ===
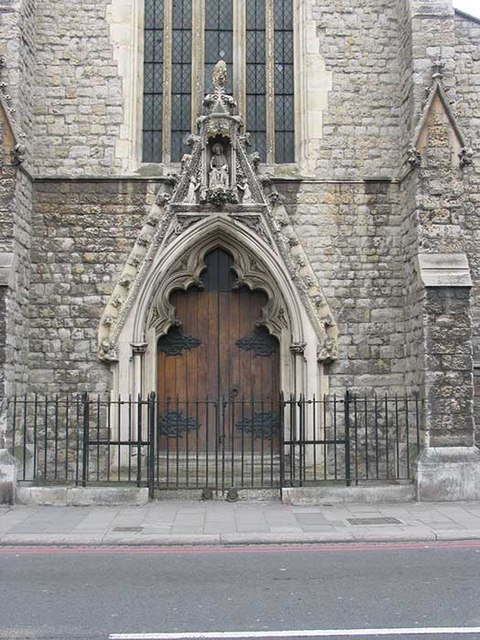
Doorway detail of Our Immaculate Lady of Victories, Clapham.

By the time of his marriage aged 23, Wardell was already independently practicing as an architect. Between 1846 and 1858 he designed, restored or re-ordered about 30 churches in the UK, a rapid success.

The heritage-listed Church of St Birinus in Bridge End, Dorchester-on-Thames, Oxfordshire was constructed between 1846 and 1849. The small and simple building is an almost exact replica of a 14th-century Gothic chapel. It is constructed of Littlemore stone with a Caen stone porch. The interior has a rectangular nave leading in the traditional fashion through a rood screen to a smaller and lower ceilinged chancel. The nave has a vaulted ceiling supported by wooden strapwork. Lit by stained glass windows, the whole structure hardly differs from the design of Anglican churches constructed in the same period. The expected paraphernalia of the more ritualistic Catholic worship is absent; side chapels and numerous secondary altars are conspicuous by their absence. The only contemporary jarring feature not found in an English country church is the set of late Byzantine style gilt chandeliers.

He designed several London churches, many now listed by Historic England. Our Ladye Star of the Sea, Greenwich, begun in 1846 and completed c1851, is fronted by a tower completed by an ornate spire which in turn is complemented by the smaller spire of the adjacent stair turret. The ruggedness of the rough faced stone tower with tall buttresses bears comparison with his later and much larger work, St. Patrick's Cathedral in Melbourne. Also heritage-listed is Our Immaculate Lady of Victories (also known as St. Mary's Church), situated in Clapham Park Road, Clapham, South London, constructed between 1848 and 1851, the same year that Wardell completed Holy Trinity, Hammersmith. From 1853 to 1854, he designed St Mary's Church in Chislehurst, where Napoleon III was buried from 1873 to 1888. Other Grade II* listed heritage buildings designed in part or full by Wardell include the Church of St Mary and St Michael in Stepney, and the lower levels of the plain brick Church of St Peter and St Edward in Palace Street, Westminster. At the former convent of the Holy Child Jesus on Magdalen Road in Hastings, Wardell designed the gateway, the training college a rugged Gothic style, and the priory in a polychrome brick mode, while his mentor Pugin designed the chapel. Wardell also designed the Old Lodge and simple Chapel of the Sacred Heart of Digby Stuart College; a lodge at Grove House in the London Borough of Wandsworth; the plain brick industrial Spode Pottery including buildings around the north west courtyard, including the entrance gate and the bottle kiln at Stoke-on-Trent. His last completed work in England was a fine chapel for family burials commissioned by Lord Petre, located in the forest at Thorndon Park, near Brentwood, Essex; this features an elaborately painted ceiling with hammerbeams featuring carved angels, and along with the ceiling and altar of the Sacred Heart Chapel in Digby is probably the only such decoration in his British work to survive.

Wardell's work wasn't just limited to England; he was commissioned by Robert Hope-Scott and his wife, of Abbotsford, Melrose, to build Our Lady & Saint Andrew's for the growing Roman Catholic community in the nearby town of Galashiels, Scotland. Work on the simple gabled church with small paired spires began in 1856, but wouldn't be completed for another 20 years.

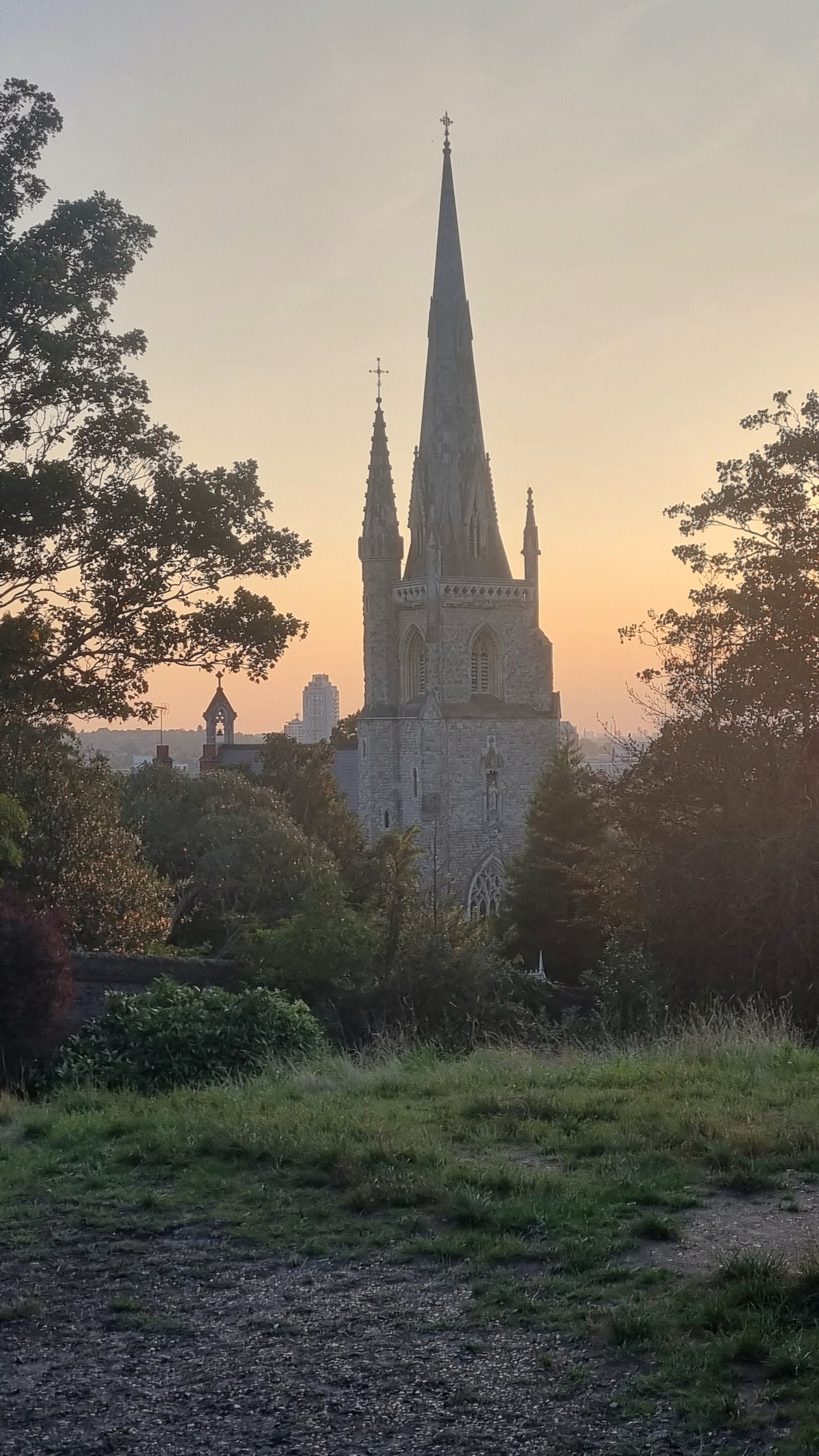
Our Ladye Star of the Sea, Greenwich

By 1858, aged 35, Wardell was in poor health, diagnosed with tuberculosis, and decided that the warmer climate and clearer air of Victoria would be beneficial. In the course of that year, he collected testimonials and sent them to a range of prospective clients, packed up his possessions, family, and business, and set sail, arriving in Melbourne in September 1858 on the Swiftsure.

=== In Victoria ===
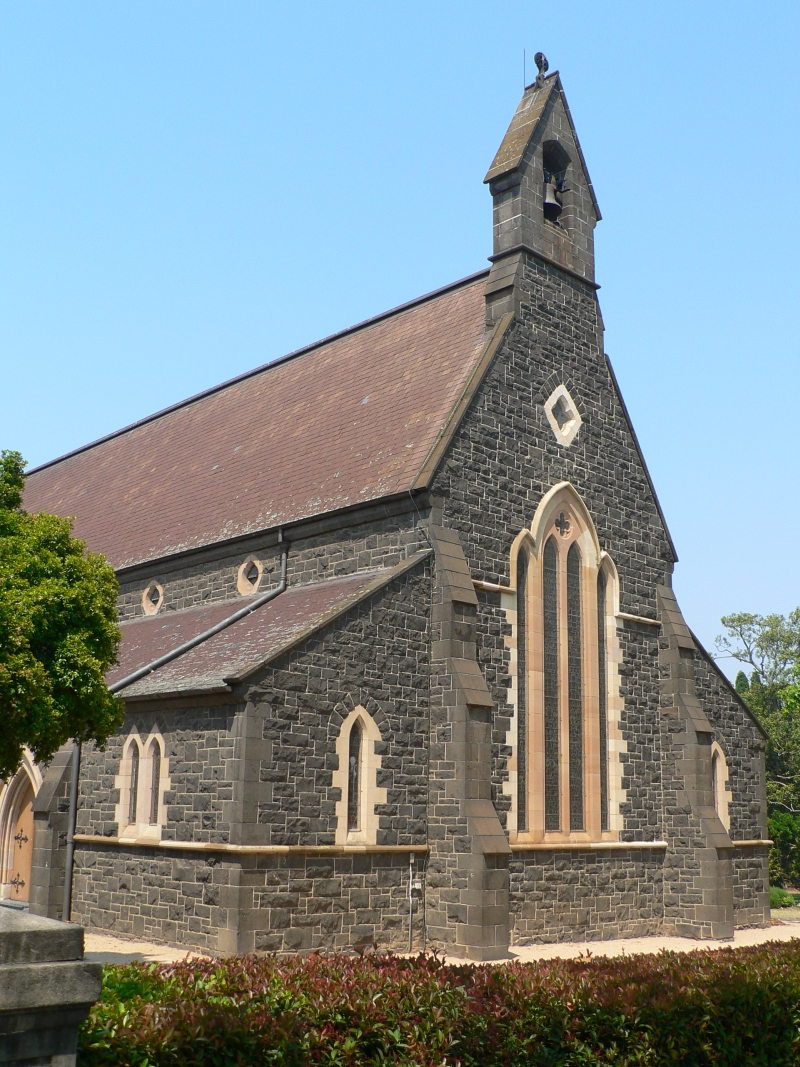
St Mary's Catholic Church. 208-214 Dandenong Road, St Kilda East.

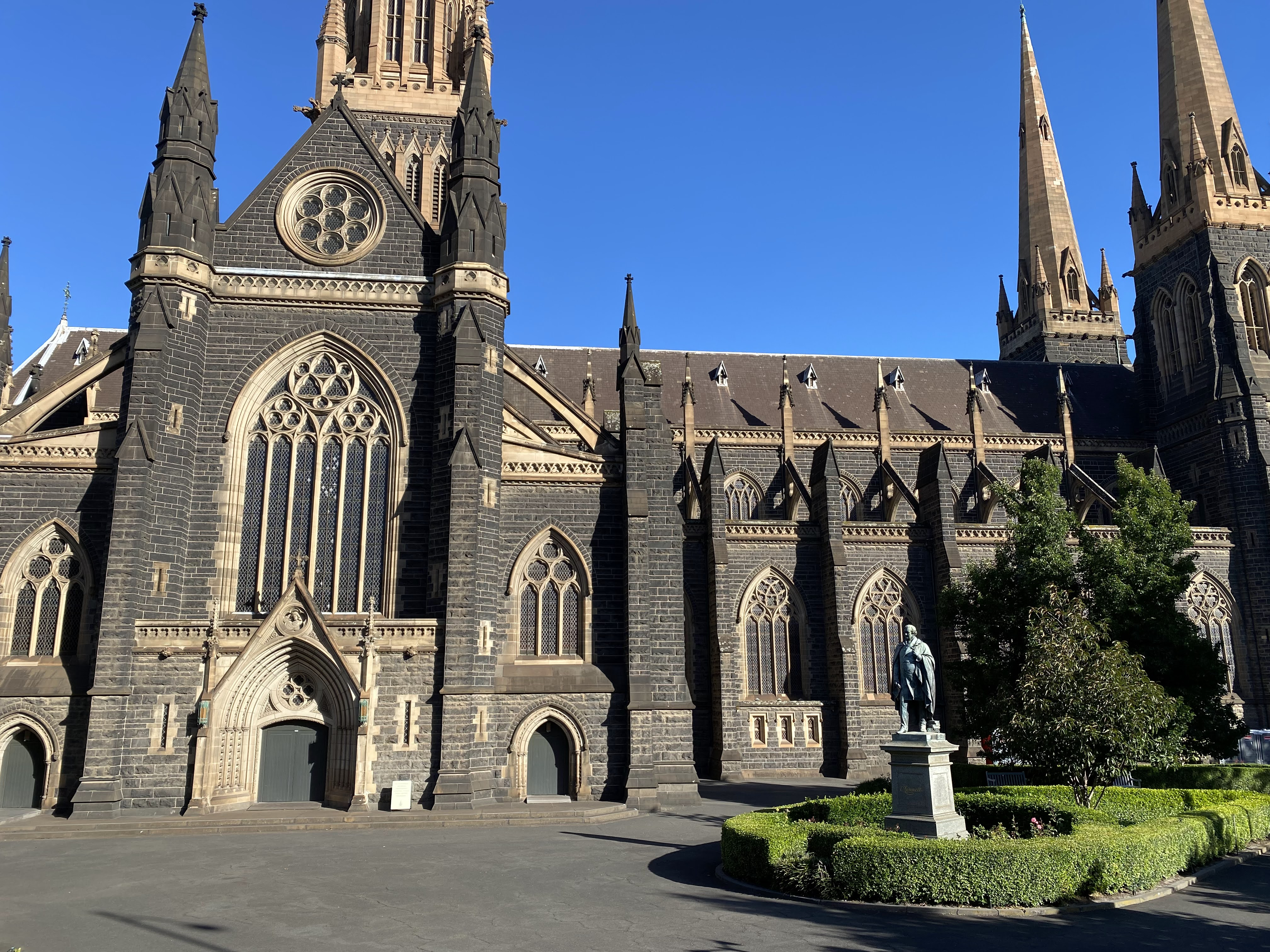
St Patrick's Cathedral, Melbourne.

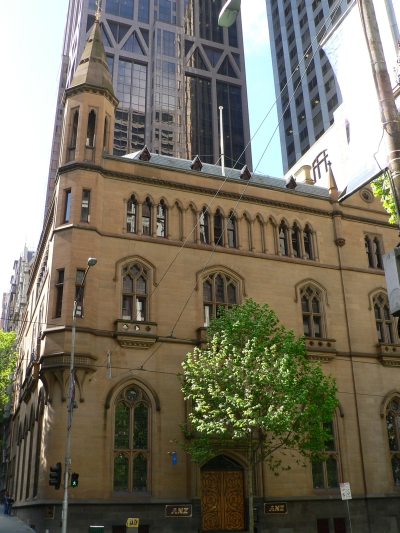
ES&A Bank (Gothic Bank)

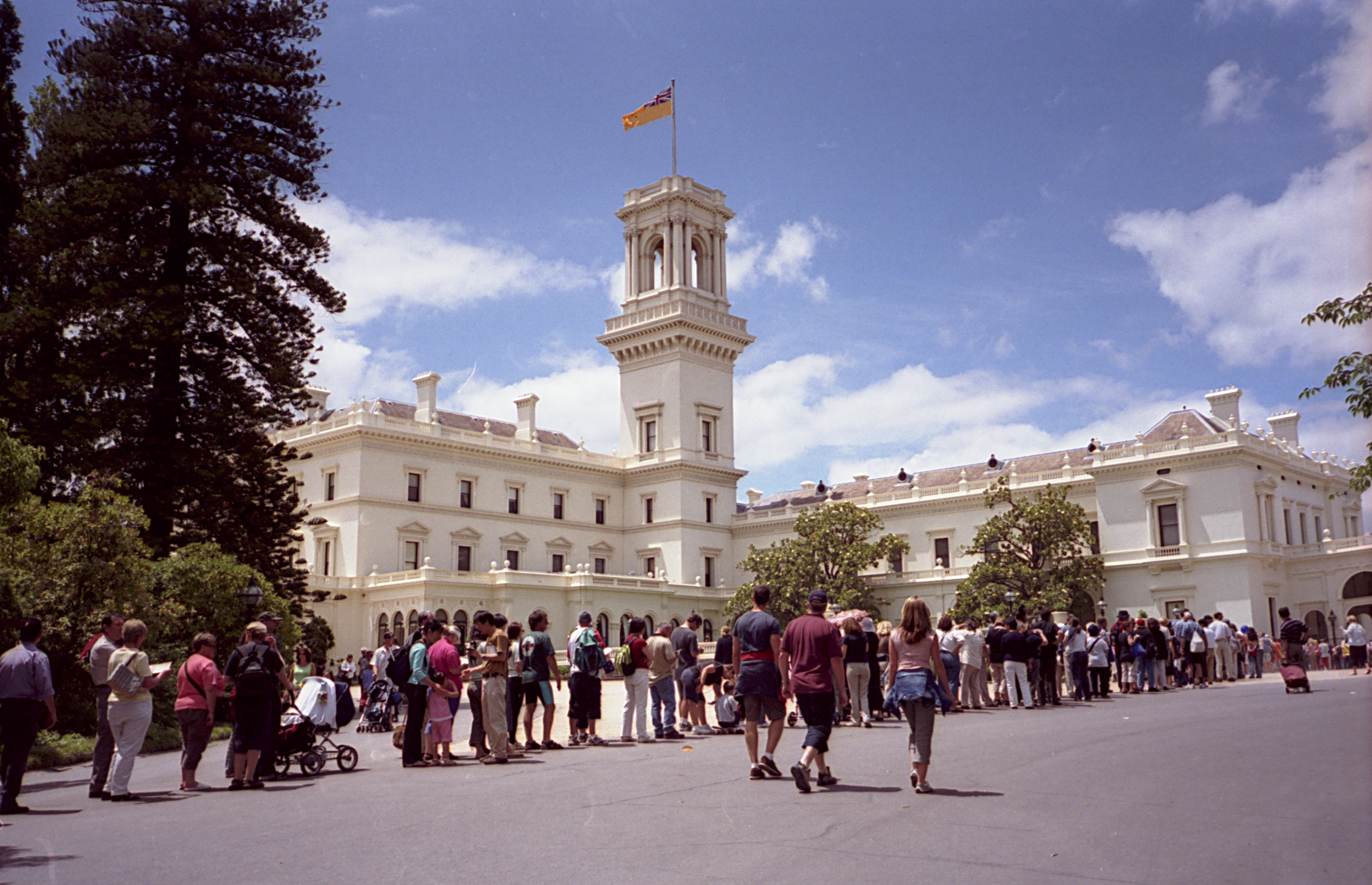
Government House, Melbourne.

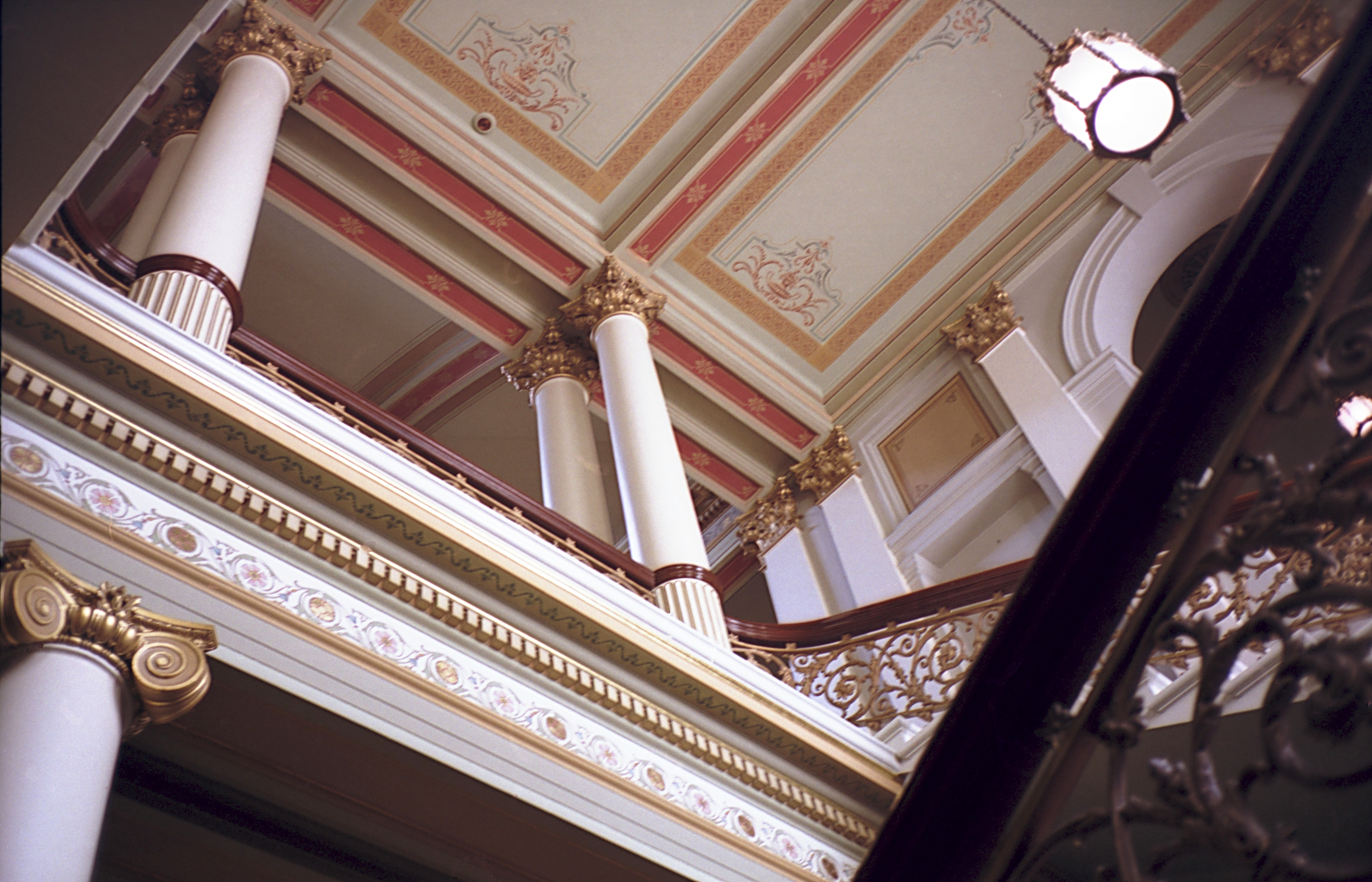
Wardell's neoclassical interior at Government House.

Melbourne at the time was in the throes of a boom sparked by the Victorian gold rush, which began in 1851. The city transformed from a rough provincial outpost to a wealthy and rapidly expanding city. Between 1853 and 1854 Melbourne doubled in size, many living at first in tents, rough huts or prefabricated houses. The need for buildings of all types, coupled with available funding drew aspiring young architects from around the world, among them John James Clark, Peter Kerr and William Wilkinson Wardell.

Wardell was probably the most experienced and well known British architect to emigrate to Victoria, certainly in the 1850s, and his services were immediately in demand. As a highly regarded architect of Catholic churches, he was soon commissioned to draw up plans for a new St Patrick's Cathedral; this was to be on an enormous scale, and was to occupy him for much of his life. The Victorian Government, faced with a huge task of providing government buildings of all types across the state also decided to draw on his expertise, and on 7 March 1859 he was appointed Chief Architect of the Public Works Department, with the right of private practice.

Over the next twenty years of his time in Victoria, he not only oversaw the design of dozens of public buildings, his private practice covered a wide range of buildings types, including another 14 parish churches for the Catholics and one for the Anglicans, houses and a mansion, banks and schools. He designed for places in country Victoria, as well as other cities in Australia, especially Sydney. He could design in any architectural form that seemed appropriate, including Palladian, Neoclassical plus the various forms of Gothic for his churches and some of the banks. During this time he designed some of the major landmarks in 19th Century Melbourne, including St Patrick's Cathedral, Government House, the Gothic Bank, and Cliveden Mansion.

At first, the family lived in Powlett Street, East Melbourne. In 1867 they moved into a large house known as Ardoch at 226 Dandenong Road, St Kilda, built a few years before, at a time when the suburb was home to much of the wealthy elite of Melbourne. In 1859, Wardell had designed the nearby St Mary's in St Kilda East, where he then personally worshipped.

In 1877 Sir Graham Berry became the premier of Victoria. His mission, considered radically left wing at the time, was to redistribute the grazing land of Victoria, and to introduce a bill providing for the payment of members of the Legislative Assembly, which would enable working-class candidates to be elected. When his aims were rejected by the Legislative Council, he embarked on a public campaign of coercion. "We coerce madmen," he said, "we put them into lunatic asylums, and never was anything more the act of madmen than the rejection of the Appropriation Bill." On 8 January 1878, known afterwards as "Black Wednesday", his "coercing" began. Using the reasoning that without his bill civil servants could not be paid, Berry began to dismiss public servants, starting with police and judges. Wardell's was one of the many heads which fell - dismissed from office, he left Melbourne to seek employment in Sydney.

His most notable works in Victoria are listed below :

==== St Patrick's Cathedral ====
Bishop James Alipius Goold commissioned the first cathedral on a prominent site in East Melbourne in 1850, delayed by labour shortages caused by the Gold rush. He then laid the foundation stone for a second, larger, church partly completed by 1858, when he instructed the newly arrived Wardell to design a cathedral, incorporating as much as possible of the partly completed church, and in December 1858 the new plans were accepted and work commenced.

Wardell's design is a fine essay in the mid 19th century Gothic Revival style, drawing inspiration from the mediaeval cathedrals of Europe and England. The nave is Early English in style, with traceried windows more typical of the later Decorated Gothic, while the apsidal chevet chapels, ambulatory and sanctuary, are based on French models.

St Patrick's Cathedral became Wardell's life's work and his most notable commission. The original plans remained unaltered during construction, while construction proceeded slowly. The nave and its aisles were completed just ten years later, but the church was not consecrated for use until 1897. At the time of his death in 1899, Wardell was still working on designs for the minor altars and fixtures and fittings. The spires however were not built until 1937–39, and are taller than he envisaged.

==== The Gothic Bank ====
Wardell's headquarters for the ES&A Bank (later the ANZ Bank), located in the heart of the financial district on the corner Collins and Queen Streets in Melbourne, is said to be the finest secular Gothic Revival building in Australia. Built between 1883 and 1887, it housed the bank's main branch banking chamber and a residence above for the bank's Australian manager, Sir George Verdon, who was deeply involved in the design. It cost £77,000, nearly twice the original budget. Where the exterior is restrained, featuring plain ashlar stone wall surfaces broken only by the traceried windows of the chamber and the residence, and notably the Venetian tracery of the first floor loggia, and a slim corner octagonal tower, the interior is elaborate and colourful. The banking chamber structure of a grid of cast iron columns, beams and connecting gothic-styled arches is frankly expressed, and all surfaces above the individually designed gold leaf foliated capitals are elaborately painted in tones of blue with gold leaf highlights. In 1922 the bank purchased the former 1890 Melbourne Stock Exchange next door, also in Gothic Revival style, and extended the chamber into it, doubling its size; all the decorative detailing was faithfully reproduced, in a testament to the regard of the original design. The public rooms of Verdon's residence above were on the scale of a suburban mansion, and elaborately finished with wallpapers, paneling and painted decoration, largely retained and restored. In 1987 it was voted Victoria's favourite building by readers of The Age newspaper.

==== Government House ====
Government House in Melbourne is the largest and grandest Government House, and one of the finest examples of the Italianate style, in Australia. The building includes the official residence of the governor of Victoria, and an enormous ballroom that has been the venue for numerous state and national official functions over its life. Wardell was the chief architect, assisted by J.J. Clark and Peter Kerr; work commenced in 1871 and it was declared open at a ball attended by 1,400 people in 1876. It served for a time as the official residence of the Governor General of Australia after Federation, from 1902 until finally regaining its original use in 1934.

Government House was designed by Wardell in the Victorian Italianate style; its likely inspiration was Queen Victoria's summer residence Osborne House on the Isle of Wight, England, built between 1845 and 1851, inspired by palazzi of the Italian Renaissance, which has similar detailing, picturesque massing, campanile-style towers, and royal associations.

Government House is located on a hill in the centre of parkland just south of the central city, visible from many points around inner Melbourne. It consists of three separately articulated blocks housing different functions, each with their own entrance, asymmetrically arranged with a dominant central tall belvedere tower. The three-storey principal block contains the state rooms for official entertaining, a secondary two-storey wing to the north contains the private apartments of the vice-regal family. The façade of the principal block features columned and pedimented windows indicating the piano nobile, a defining feature of the Italianate style. The two storey ballroom block stretches south of the main block and the tower, and is entered through a large arcaded and columned porte-cochere. The ballroom is said to have been the largest in the British Empire. The interior of Government House is elaborately decorated in contrast to the chaste lines of the exterior.

==== Cliveden Mansion ====
Built in 1887 for pastoralist and businessman Sir William Clarke, Cliveden was probably the largest private house ever built in Melbourne, with 28 bedrooms, five bathrooms,17 servant rooms, and a ballroom that could fit 250 guests. Designed in a restrained Renaissance Revival style, it was located on a prominent site very close to the city on the corner of Wellington Parade and Clarendon Street, East Melbourne. The interior by contrast featured elaborate woodwork in the Queen Anne style. After Lady Clarke's death, in 1909 a floor was added and it was converted into 48 luxury apartments, a new idea in Melbourne. In 1968, it was sold and demolished to make way for the city's first Hilton Hotel, with some interior elements reused in the 'Cliveden Room'; they were sold off in 2018, and a large stained glass window and a pair of elaborate doors were purchased by the National Gallery Victoria.

==== Other buildings ====
St John's Toorak, for the Anglicans, is another early church, designed in 1859. It is a notable essay in the early Gothic revival, with simple forms, low aisle roofs contrasted by a tall central tower, not completed until 1873. The Church of St Peter & St Paul in Geelong, built 1864-66, is a fine Catholic parish church in his typically restrained Gothic style again executed in bluestone. In 1867 he designed a large parish church for the inner suburb of Richmond, St Ignatius, built in stages up to 1896 (the tower was built in the 1920s to a different design).

His branch for the ES&A Bank in Camberwell was in a restrained brown brick Gothic, with unusual stepped gables. The large accommodation block for the catholic girls school Genazzano in Kew, Melbourne was designed in a similar mode, but far grander, and built in 1890-91.

Wardell is also thought to be principally responsible as the designer and engineer for the large dry-dock built in Williamstown between 1864 and 1873, known as the Alfred Graving Dock.

=== In Sydney ===
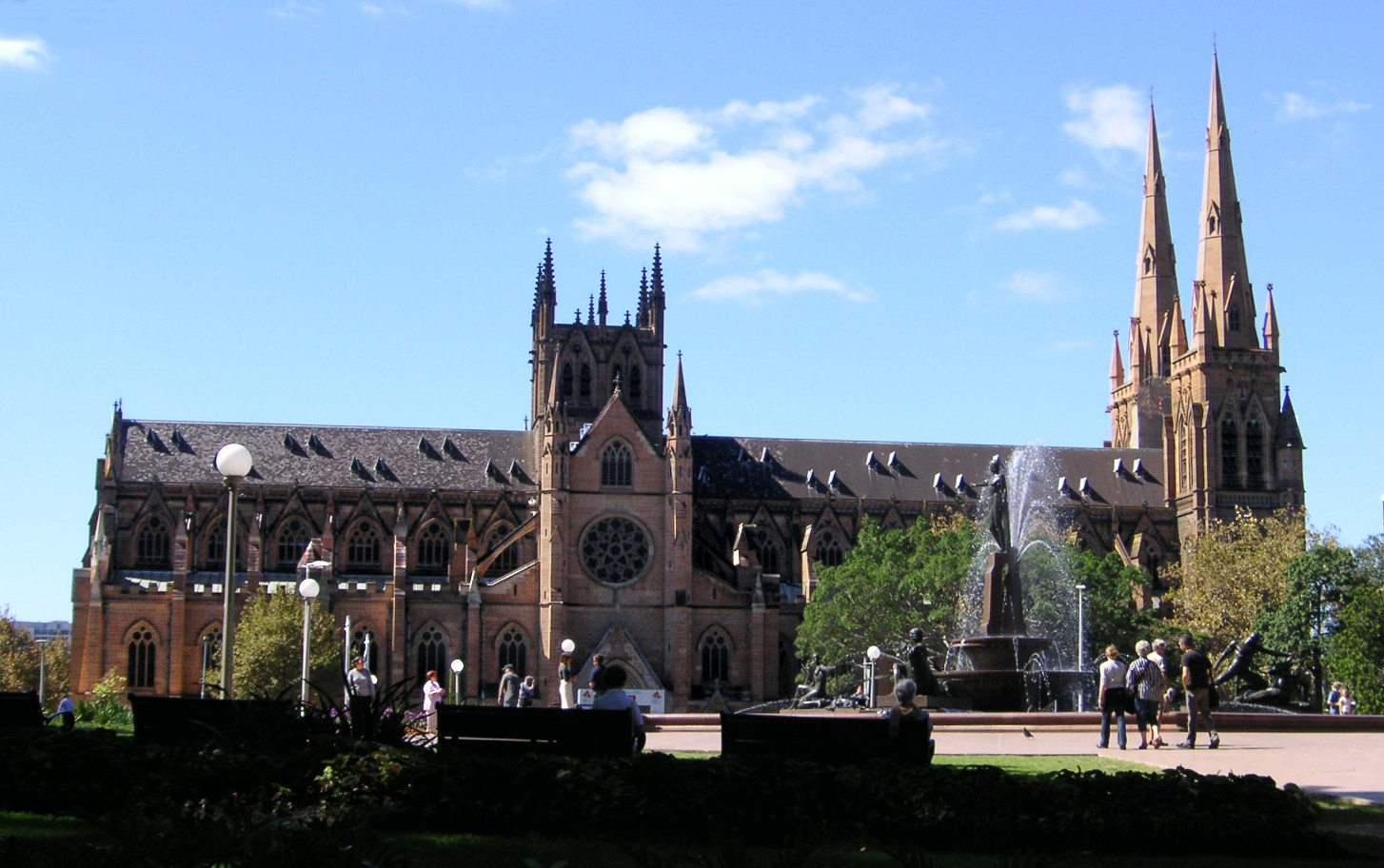
St. Mary's Cathedral from Hyde Park.

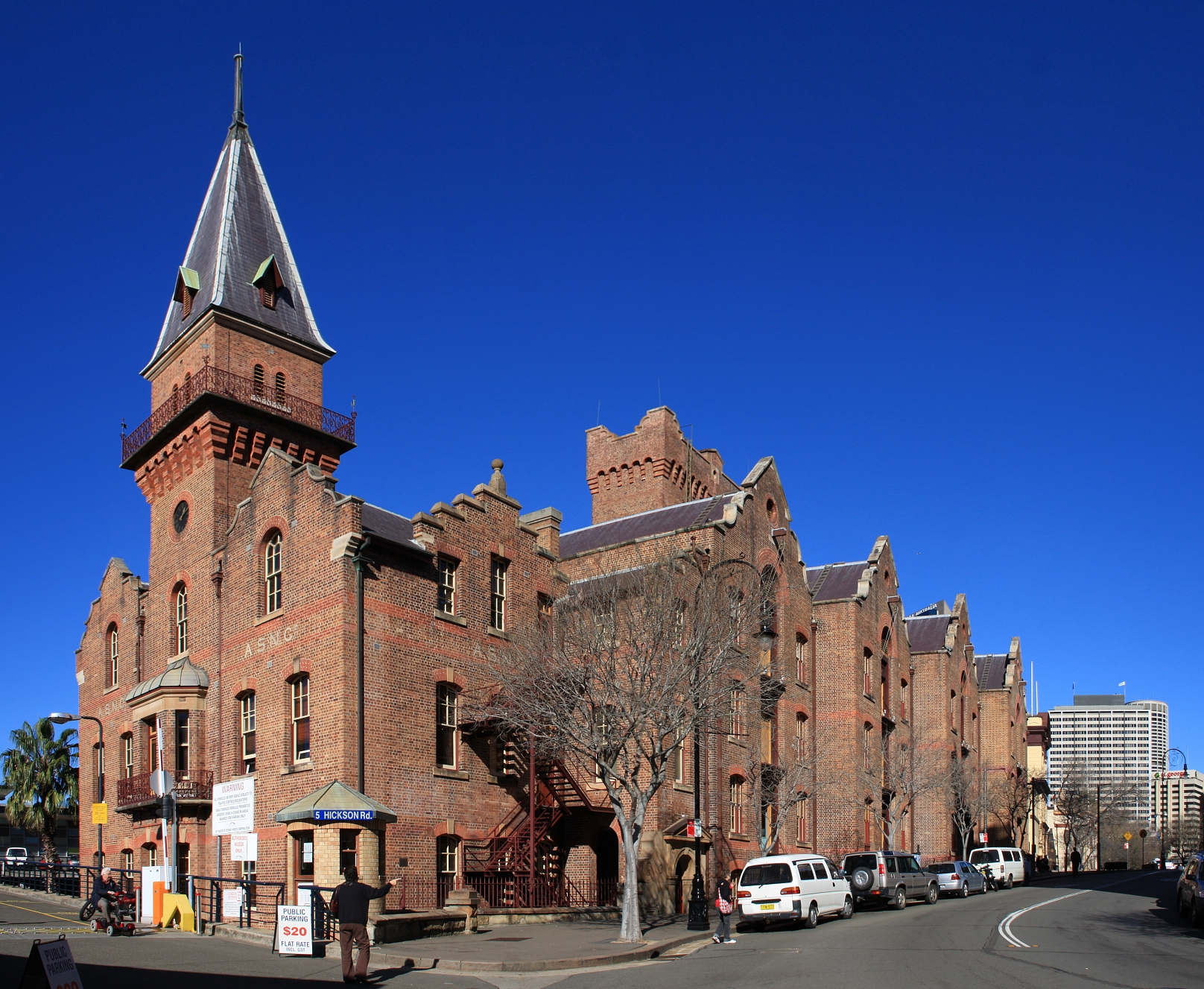
ASN Co building, The Rocks, Sydney.

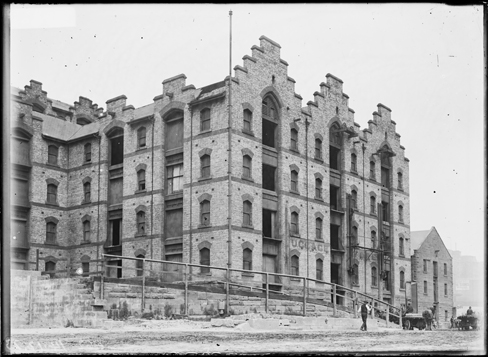
The Grafton Bond Store in Millers Point, Sydney, pictured in 1923.

Wardell arrived in Sydney in 1878. He designed many buildings, the most notable being St Mary's Cathedral and St John's College at The University of Sydney.

==== St Mary's Cathedral ====
St Mary's Cathedral is slightly larger than St Patrick's Cathedral, and is the largest ecclesiastical building in Australia. Wardell designed the cathedral in the Gothic style, in a very similar format to St Patrick's in Melbourne. Work began in 1868 while Wardell was still based in Melbourne, and continued throughout Wardell's lifetime, and beyond. Dedicated in 1882, the nave was not completed until 1928, following Wardell's design closely. In 2000 the south front spires Wardell had intended were finally constructed.

==== St John's College ====
In February 1859 Wardell was appointed architect for St John's College. Working from Melbourne, he drew up the general plans and sent them to Sydney in May 1859. Wardell designed St John's College as a three-storied sandstone Gothic Revival building on an H-shaped plan but because of budget restrictions with a limit of A£30,000, July and August saw discussion of Wardell's design and of how much could be built within the budget. In September and October the general plans were approved by the St John's Council and the University Senate. During the period from October 1859 to April 1860 relations between Wardell and the Council deteriorated for various reasons, ultimately ending with Wardell's resignation in June 1860.

==== Other buildings ====
The ASN Co building is a large warehouse at 1-5 Hickson Road, The Rocks, Sydney. Designed by Wardell in the Pre-Federation Anglo Dutch style for the Australasian Steam Navigation Company and completed in 1885, it had distinctive Flemish gables and a bell tower, which has ensured it has "long been regarded as a significant Sydney landmark".

Wardell also designed the New South Wales Club House building at 31 Bligh Street in the Victorian Academic Classical style, completed in 1884; and is currently occupied by the Lowy Institute. He also designed significant 1881 extensions to the Grafton Bond Store in Millers Point, Sydney.

In 1883 Wardell designed the English, Scottish and Australian Bank at 131–135 George Street, The Rocks. The two storey sandstone building was completed in 1885 and is a rare example of Venetian Gothic Revival in Sydney. It was in fact a smaller version of a more impressive design for the bank in Adelaide, completed in 1883, and since demolished. Elements from both designs were repeated in his 1883 design for the Gothic Bank in Melbourne, combined with Venetian elements, and sumptuous interiors.

== Architectural legacy ==
Wardell died at his home, Upton Grange, in Edward Street, North Sydney on 19 November 1899 of heart failure and pleurisy. He is buried in the Catholic section of Gore Hill Cemetery. He did not live long enough to see the final finishing touches to St Patrick's Cathedral, and St Mary's Cathedral was far from finished. His legacy to Australia has been to give that country two cathedrals which rank among the finest modern examples of gothic architecture. St Patrick's Cathedral is considered one of the few Australian buildings to be of world significance. However, Wardell's work was more than the design of two cathedrals, his work was versatile and skilful in both the Gothic and classical styles and has given both Sydney and Melbourne some of their most distinguished 19th-century buildings.

The Victorian Chapter of the Australian Institute of Architects honours Wardell by presenting the William Wardell Award for Public Architecture at the Victorian Architecture Awards.

== Gallery ==
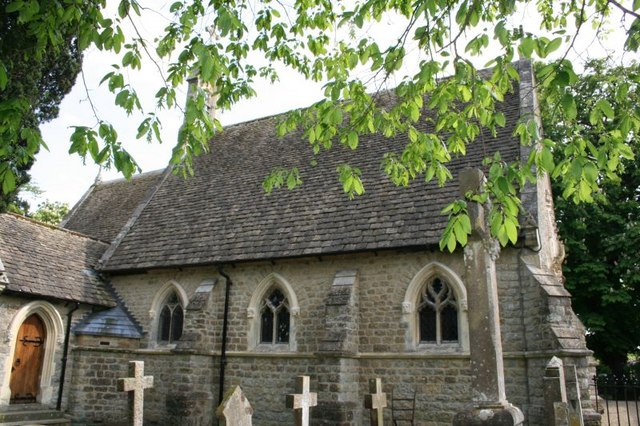
St Brirnus Roman Catholic Church, Dorchester-on-Thames

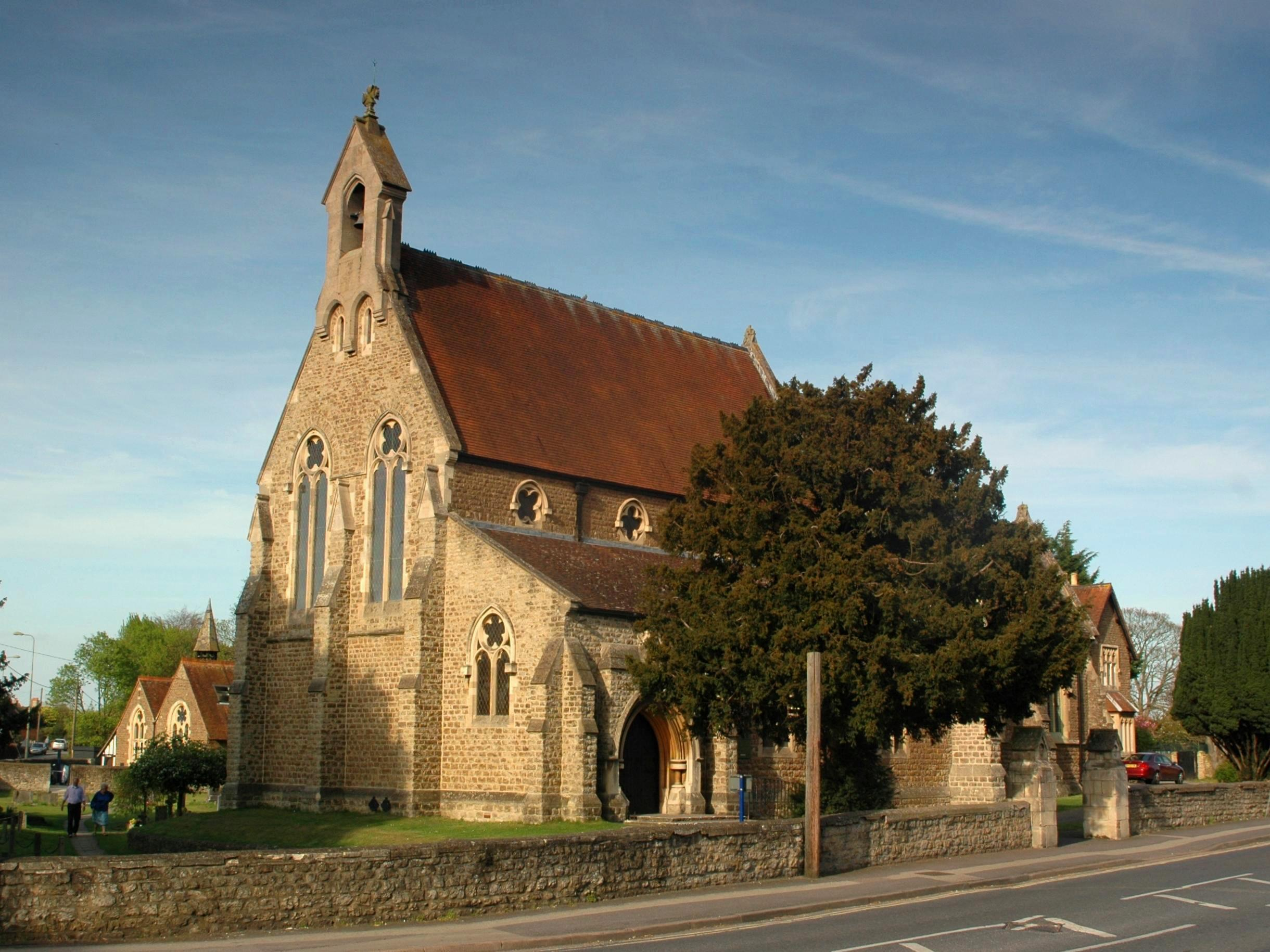
Our Lady and St Edmund's Church, Abingdon

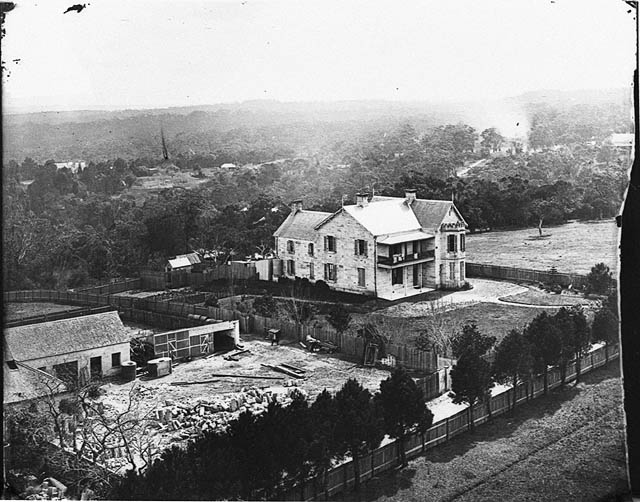
Upton Grange, where Wardell died in 1899

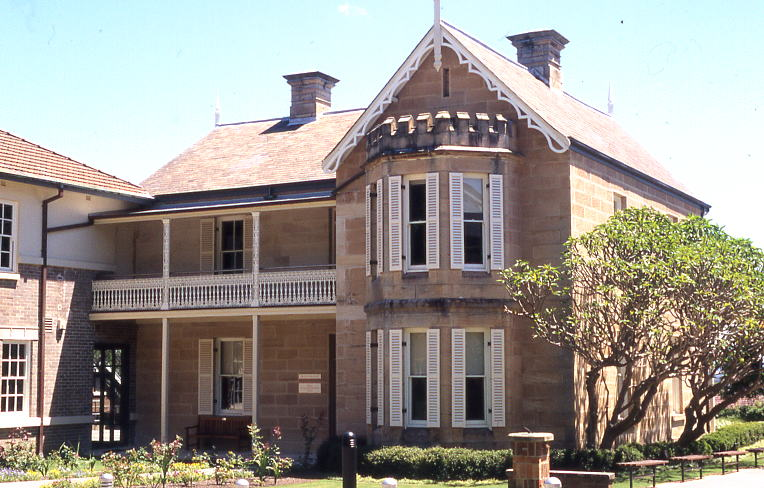
Contemporary shot of Upton Grange, North Sydney

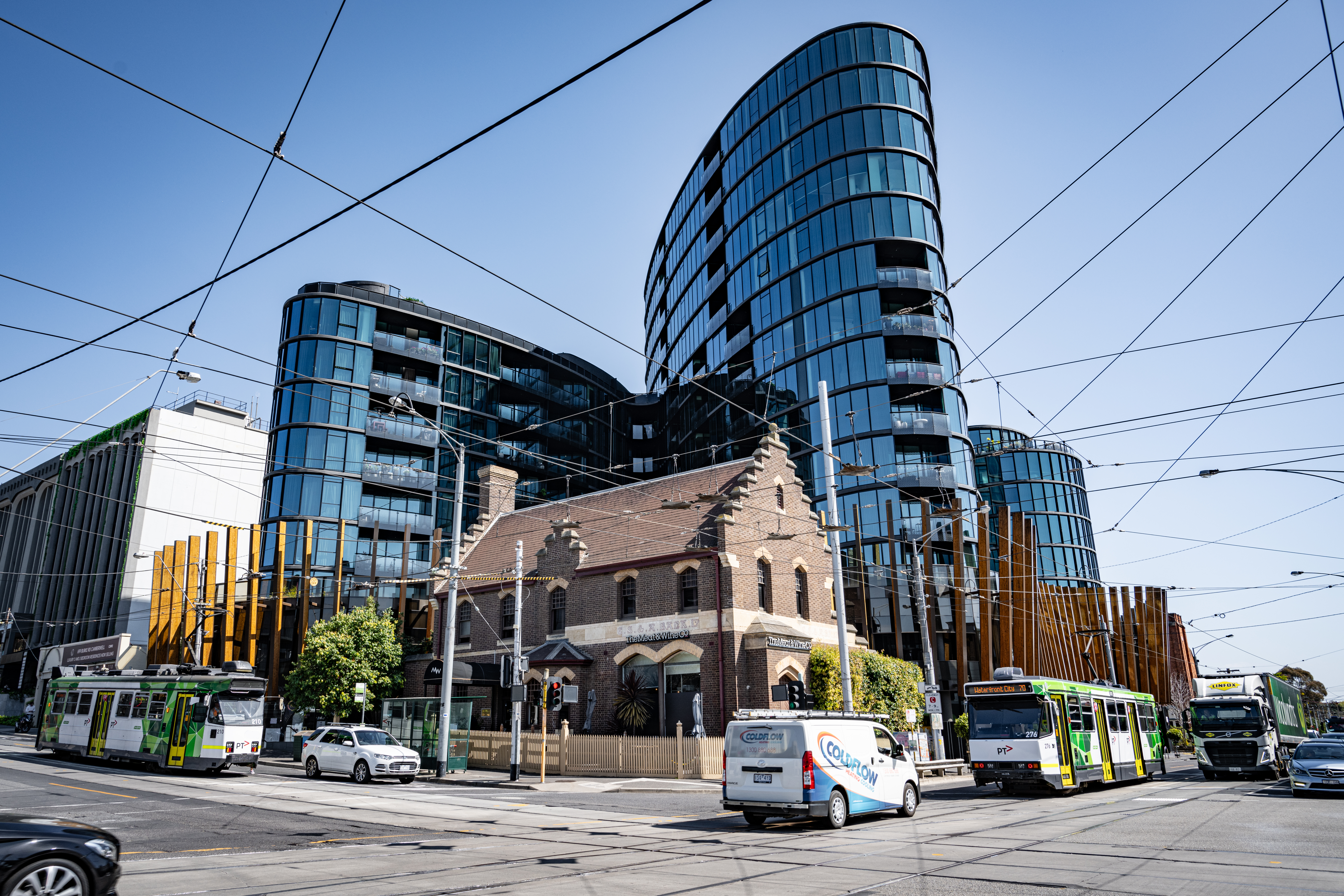
ES&A Bank, Camberwell, Melbourne

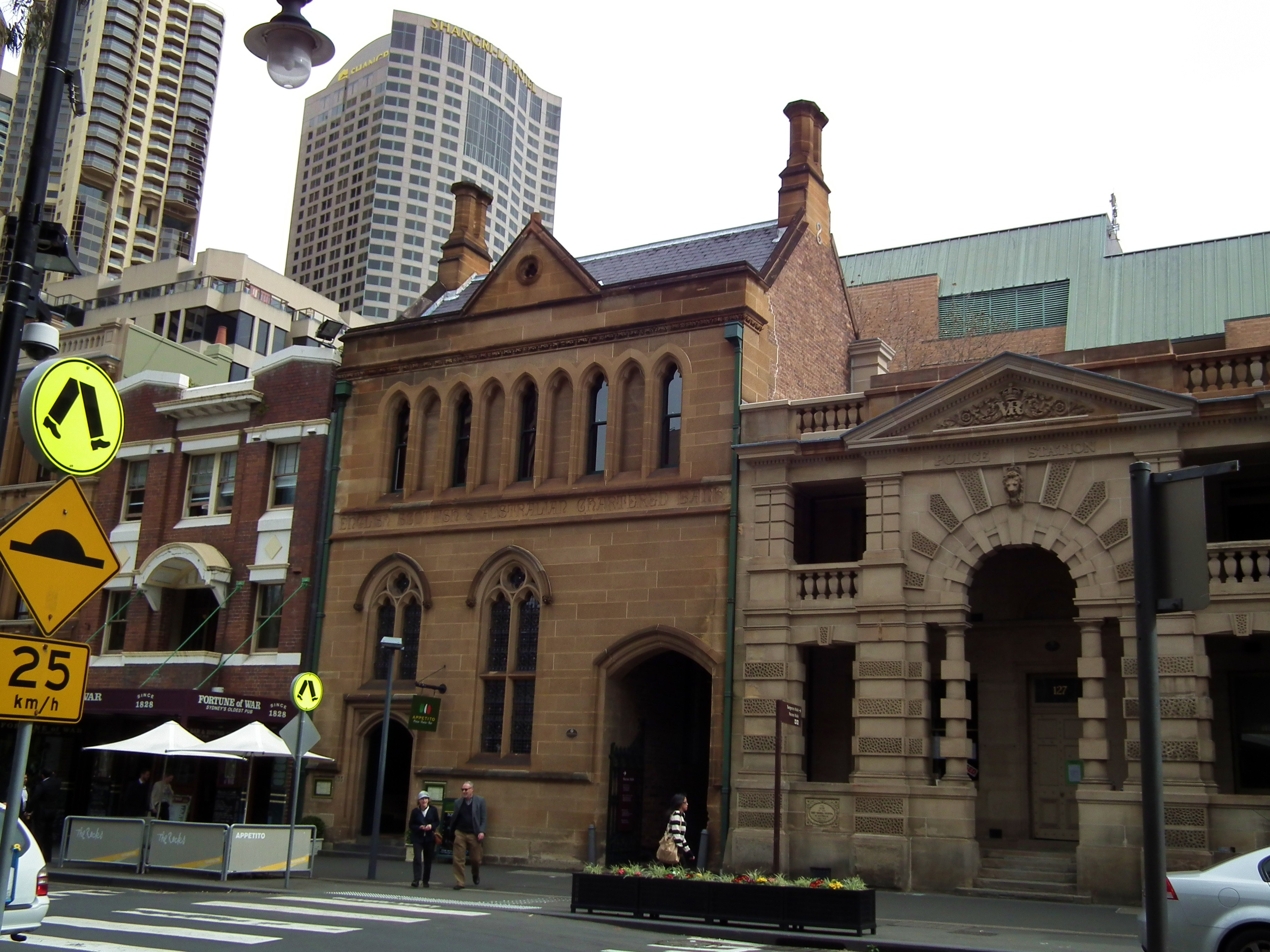
ES&A Bank, the Rocks, Sydney

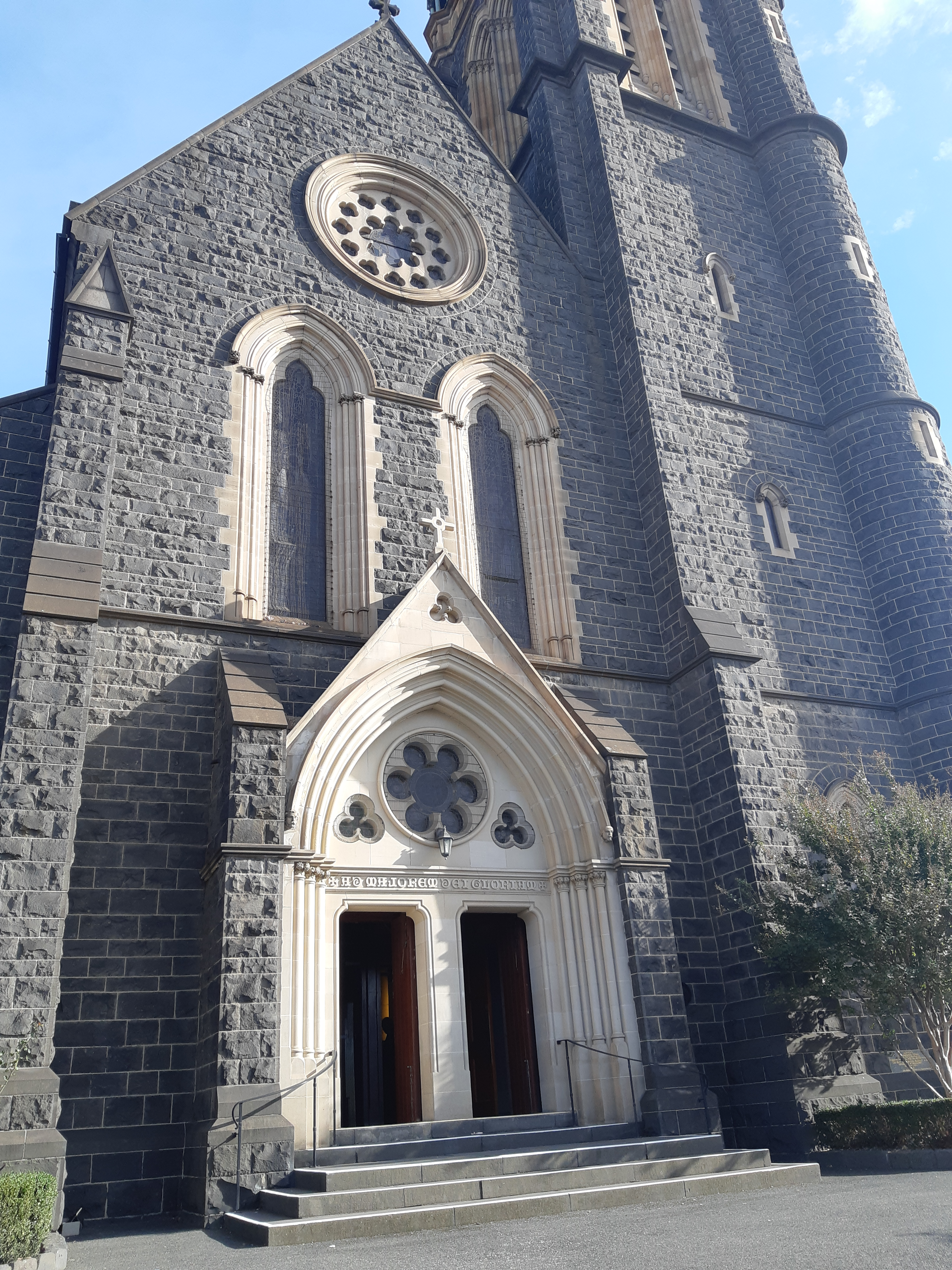
St Ignatius, Richmond, Melbourne
