= Grafton Bond Store =

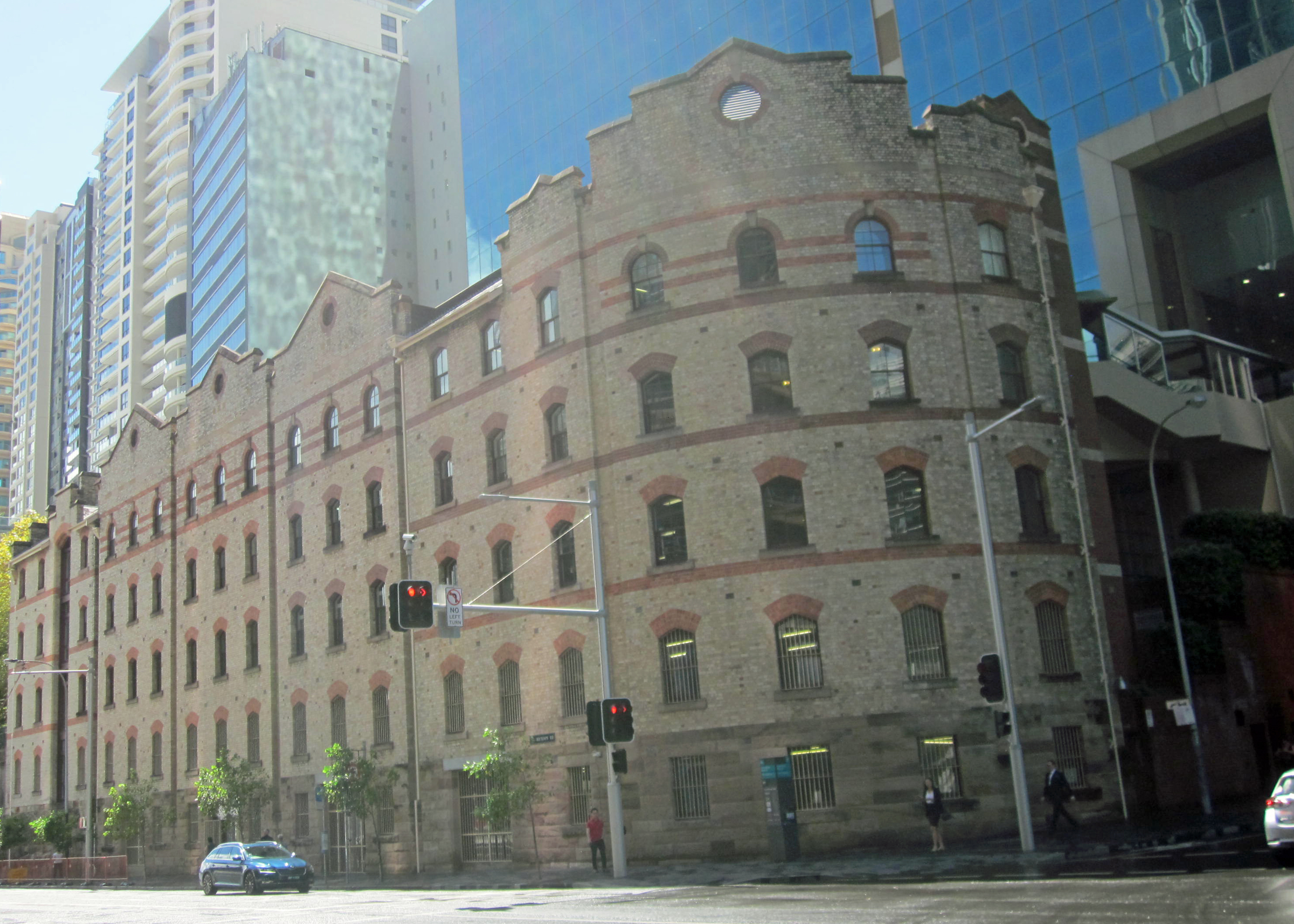
- Grafton Bond Store, facing north

- Location within Sydney Location within Australia
- 33.8637°S 151.2032°E
- Location: Hickson Road, Millers Point, Sydney, New South Wales, Australia

History
- Built: c. 1835; 1881; 1925; 1980s

Site notes
- Architect: William Wardell (1881 sections)
- Owner: Transport for NSW

New South Wales Heritage Register
- Official name: Grafton Bond Store and Sandstone Wall; Part of Maritime Centre; Price Waterhouse Building
- Type: State heritage (built)
- Designated: 18 April 2000
- Reference no.: 1431
- Type: Office building
- Category: Government and Administration

Grafton Bond Store is a heritage-listed former bond store and warehouse and now offices located at 60 Hickson Road, in the inner city Sydney suburb of Millers Point, New South Wales, Australia. The 1881 sections of the building were designed by William Wardell. It was incorporated into the new Maritime Centre (also known as Price Waterhouse Building) in the 1980s. It was added to the New South Wales State Heritage Register on 18 April 2000.

== History ==
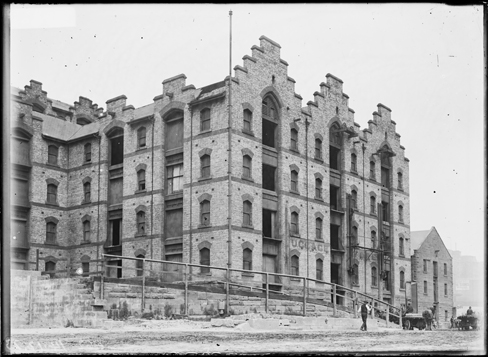
Grafton Bond Store, 1923

Grafton Wharf was established at what was then Cockle Bay in about 1835. In 1881 it was bought by John Frazer and Co and was greatly enlarged, so that by 1886 it had a frontage to the east side of Darling Harbour of 131 metres (430 ft), and three piers "capable of receiving and shipping cargo of any character and weight". In 1886 there were 14 warehouses, with a large capacity of some 44,000 tonnes (49,000 short tons) of cargo and facilities for pressing 1600 bales of wool a day. It was claimed to be the largest bond warehouse complex in Australia. The building now known as Grafton Bond was part of this complex. In 1888 the stores became the property of Burns Philp & Co Ltd. The present building is a remnant of a much larger complex. The other components of the complex that survived the dramatic changes brought about by the 1893 depression and the redevelopment by the Sydney Harbour Trust, were demolished with the formation of Hickson Road in 1925, which cut across the whole Grafton Wharf site. At that time even this last large building was altered, though it remains largely as it was designed by William Wardell, one of Australia's greatest architects. Incorporated into the new Maritime Centre in the late 1980s, the refurbished Grafton Bond has been successfully adapted for this reuse.

The sandstone wall was associated with the growth of wharf facilities and the expansion of the western side of the city, and provides a level access to properties at Kent Street.

== Description ==
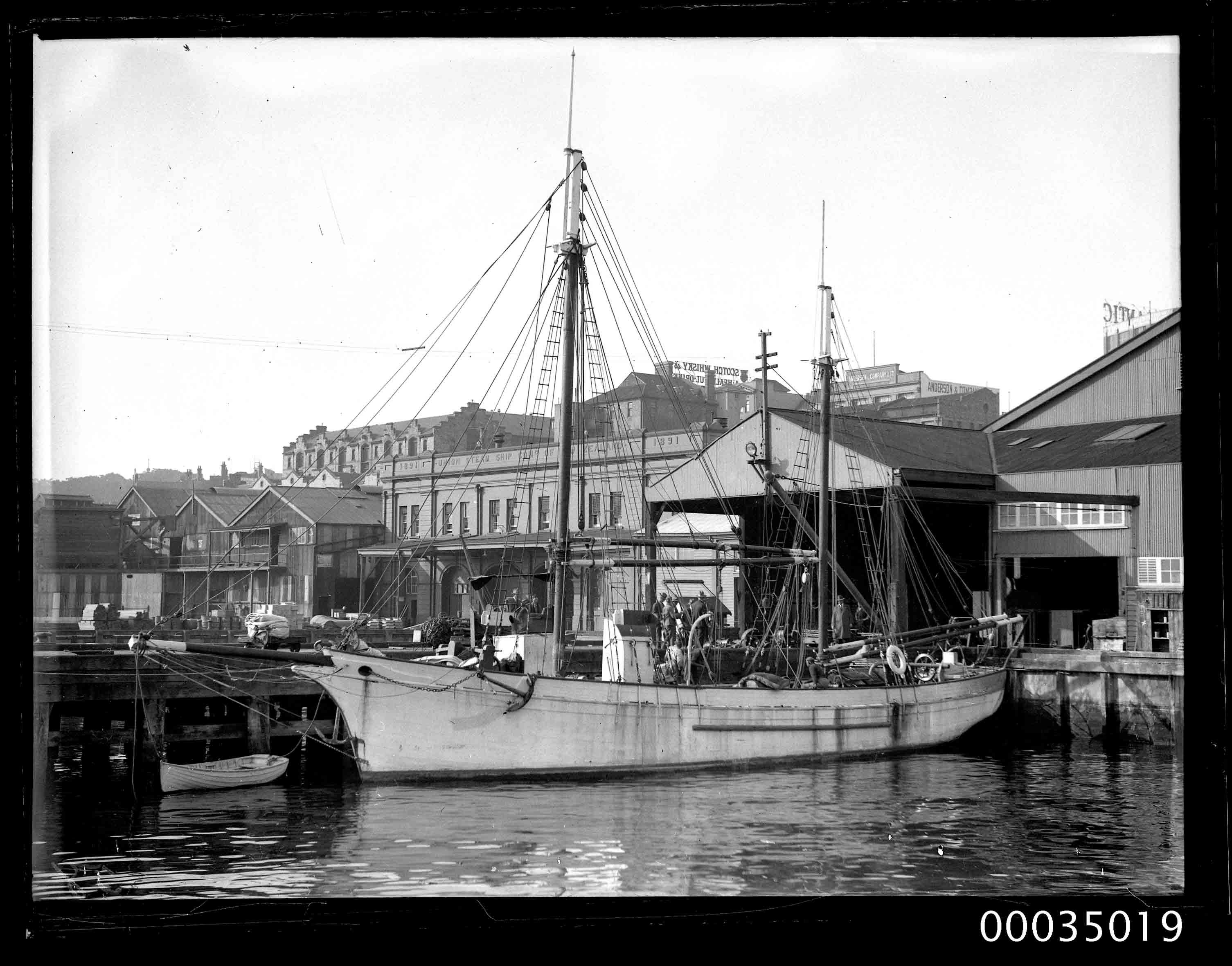
Sam Hood 1923 photograph of the sailing ketch Corwa berthed near the Union Steam Ship Company of New Zealand's wharf in Darling Harbour. The Grafton Bond Store can be seen top left.

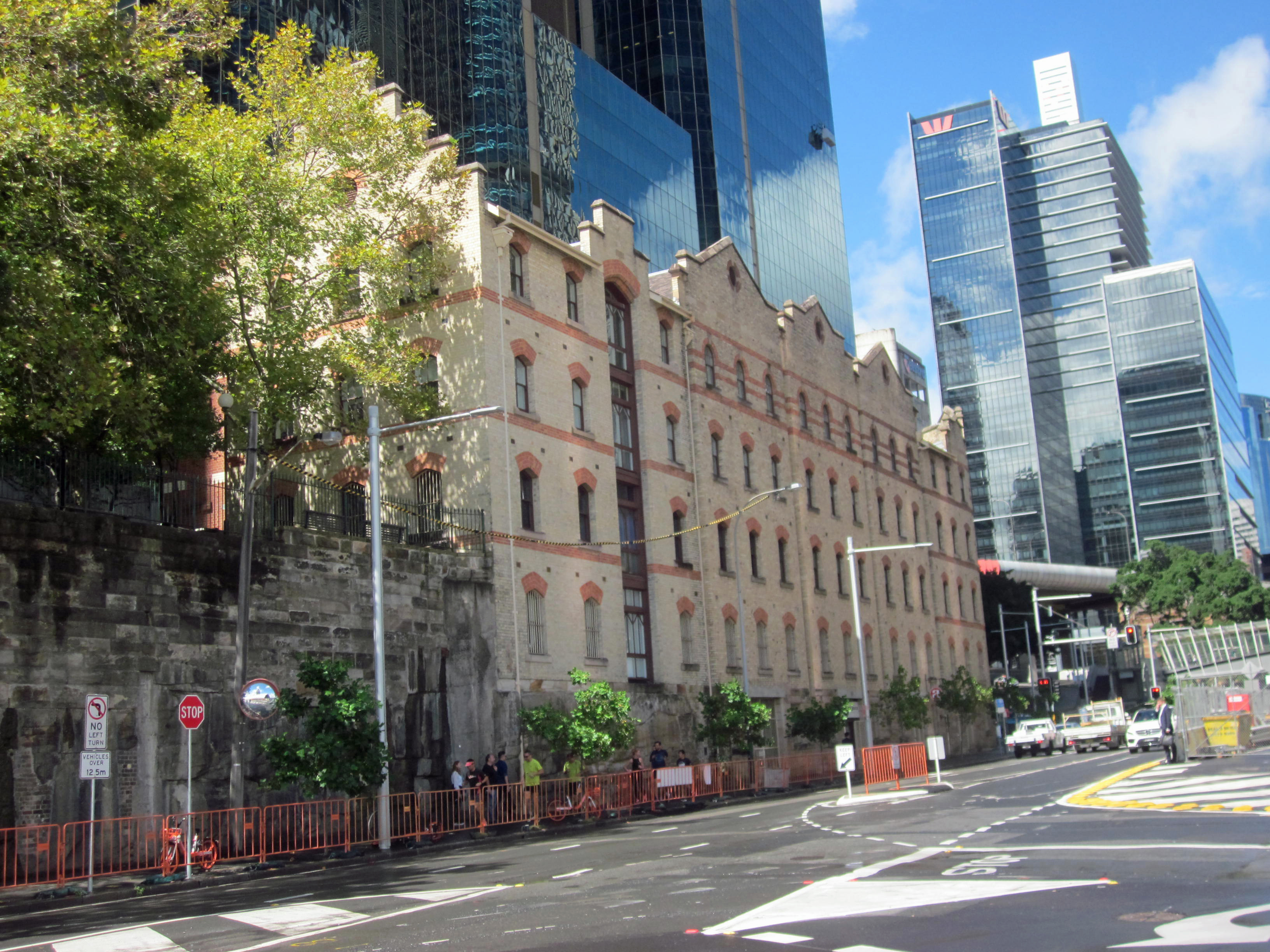
Grafton Bond Store, showing adjoining wall

The building stands monument like in Hickson Road below the glass towers in Kent Street, a juxtaposition of new and old which, when seen from the west across the water, is one of the most engaging views of Sydney. The building is long and narrow, four and five storeys high at Hickson Road, and three above the rock shelf behind. The Hickson Road facade three bays with plain parapeted gables, one with eaves and two with stepped parapets, one of which curves gracefully around the Napoleon Street corner. The lowest storey is sandstone. The east side, which once faced Jenkins Street, has three stepped gable parapets in the northern European manner, with catheads at the top. Internally the structure is of heavy hardwood posts and girders, with joists, herringboning and timber flooring. Some of the king post roof trusses are visible. It has recently been refurbished with the addition of two masonry service sections to the east linked by a partly glazed access gallery. The walls are built in English bond, of cream bricks believed to have been brought from Newcastle upon Tyne as sailing ballast. The Dutch gables bear the date 1881 and a monogram formed in red bricks, presumed but without certainty, to be John Frazers. The depressed pointed arches and round arches over openings, and banding in the walling, are laid in red-orange bricks.

The sandstone wall is a substantial cutting of the natural sandstone, on which a cut stone wall has been constructed, increasing the scale and providing level access to properties at Kent Street. A park reserve has been introduced at the top of the wall, adjacent to MSB offices. Once defining the natural harbour foreshore, the wall now forms an eastern boundary to Hickson Road.

The unusual inverted "V" voussoirs in contrasting brickwork, stepped parapet and curved corner contribute to the striking street facade.

=== Modifications and dates ===
Two of the original 1881 stores were demolished for the widening of Hickson Street in 1925. The building was refurbished and added to when the Kent Street Maritime Building was erected. The effect on the old building was the construction of two eastern appendages: the larger at the south end containing services, ancillary spaces and escape stairs in a curved design; the smaller at the north end containing stairs and an elevator. They employ complementary forms and colours. Between these a three-level partly-glazed access gallery was added, its bullnose roof cutting across the wide point. The third store was demolished in 1960s. Extensive conservation and refurbishment works were undertaken in 1988 as part of the redevelopment of the adjoining site with a modern multi-storey building.

Recent construction of sandstone walling to the north.

== Heritage listing ==
Grafton Bond has historic significance as a remnant of what was claimed to have been the largest bond store complex in Australia. It is a complex building redolent of the busy wharfage area of earlier times and of a large mercantile facility which was once an important part of the city. It has aesthetic significance as an excellent example of urban commercial utilitarian design, by an eminent Australian architect, William Wardell and its design displays the Northern European influence evident in much of the work of the architect, such as the three stepped gable parapets on the eastern elevation. Its recent refurbishment and well contrived juxtaposition with modem glass towers is a most successful conservation project. It has scientific significance for its fine craftsmanship and its clever response to the hilly terrain of this part of Sydney.

Grafton Bond Store was listed on the New South Wales State Heritage Register on 18 April 2000 having satisfied the following criteria.

The place is important in demonstrating the course, or pattern, of cultural or natural history in New South Wales.

The site is associated with the historic development of wharfage and mercantile facilities in this area of Sydney. It is a remnant of what was claimed to be the biggest bond store complex in Australia. It is part of the Dutch-influenced over of William Wardell, one of Australia's most eminent 19th-century architects. The sandstone wall is significant for its association with the growth of wharf facilities and expansion of the western side of the city.

The place is important in demonstrating aesthetic characteristics and/or a high degree of creative or technical achievement in New South Wales.

The former Grafton Bond building is a skilled piece of design in bichromatic brickwork and sandstone, using bricks imported from Britain. The style displays the Northern European influence evident in much of the work of the architect, William Wardell. Prominent on a curved corner site, it is a fine and bold element in the streetscape. Its refurbishment and incorporation into a design focussed upon the new, large scale buildings, separated by an effective plaza, has aesthetic value as a good example of adaptive re-use and infill development. The sandstone wall is significant for its distinctive and prominent contribution to Hickson Road and vicinity.

The place has a strong or special association with a particular community or cultural group in New South Wales for social, cultural or spiritual reasons.

The sandstone wall is significant for its distinctive and prominent contribution to Hickson Road and vicinity.

The place has potential to yield information that will contribute to an understanding of the cultural or natural history of New South Wales.

The building displays fine craftsmanship, demonstrating traditional materials, forms, structures and details. Its integration into a dramatically steep rocky site is masterful.

The place possesses uncommon, rare or endangered aspects of the cultural or natural history of New South Wales.

The combination of a number of related unusual aspects, including the use of very uncommon British bricks, display a strong Dutch influence, and an unusual, gracefully curved end, make it particularly rare example of warehouse design.

The place is important in demonstrating the principal characteristics of a class of cultural or natural places/environments in New South Wales.

Grafton Bond is representative of the historic development of wharfage and mercantile facilities in this area of Sydney. It is also representative of the work of William Wardell, one of Australia's finest architects.

== See also ==
- Australian non-residential architectural styles
