= Thomas Adamson (priest) =

Catholic priest (born 1901)

The Very Reverend Monsignor Thomas Adamson

Orders
- Ordination: 1926 by Archbishop Keating
- Consecration: 1955 by Pope Pius XII

Personal details
- Born: 30 September 1901 Preston, Lancashire
- Died: 21 April 1991 (aged 89) Liverpool, Merseyside
- Denomination: Roman Catholic
- Parents: George Adamson; Teresa Higginson
- Education: Beda College, Rome
- Coat of arms

Thomas Adamson STL (30 September 1901 – 21 April 1991), a 20th-century Roman Catholic priest, served as domestic prelate to Pope Pius XII then as a canon residentiary of Liverpool Metropolitan Cathedral, before becoming archdiocesan vicar general.

== Early life ==
Born in 1901 at Alston Lane near Preston, the eldest son of George Adamson (1877–1952) and his wife Teresa (d. 1939), daughter of Thomas Higginson, his patrilineal ancestors were Lancashire recusants. Among his three uncles who entered holy orders was the Revd James Adamson, vice-president of Ushaw College, while a collateral ancestor, Dom Richard, a monk at Holm Cultram Abbey after the dissolution of the monasteries, became vicar of Bexley, Kent.

Adamson attended St Edward's College, West Derby, then St Joseph's College, Upholland, before graduating from St Mary's College, Oscott. He pursued further studies at the Pontifical Gregorian University, Rome, receiving the degree of Licentiate of Moral Theology.

== Ecclesiastical career ==
Ordained a priest in the Church of Rome in 1926, Adamson went up to Beda College when Mgr Charles Duchemin was rector, and upon his return to Britain served from 1928 until 1945 as Private Secretary to the Most Revd Richard Downey, Archbishop of Liverpool.

Parish priest of St Clare's Church, Liverpool from 1945, he became Supernumerary Privy Chamberlain to Pope Pius XI in 1932 and a domestic prelate to the Pope in 1955. Thereafter, Adamson served as vicar general of the Archdiocese of Liverpool from 1955 until 1965 and, in 1966, was appointed Protonotary Apostolic to Pope Paul VI and later a conventual chaplain of the Sovereign Military Order of Malta.

Adamson died in 1991 at Lourdes Hospital (now Spire Hospital), Liverpool.

== See also ==
- Catholic Church in England
- Order of Malta
- Roman Curia
