= Tom Williams (bishop) =

English prelate (born 1948)

The Right Reverend Thomas Anthony Williams
- Titular Bishop of Mageo; Auxiliary Bishop Emeritus of Liverpool
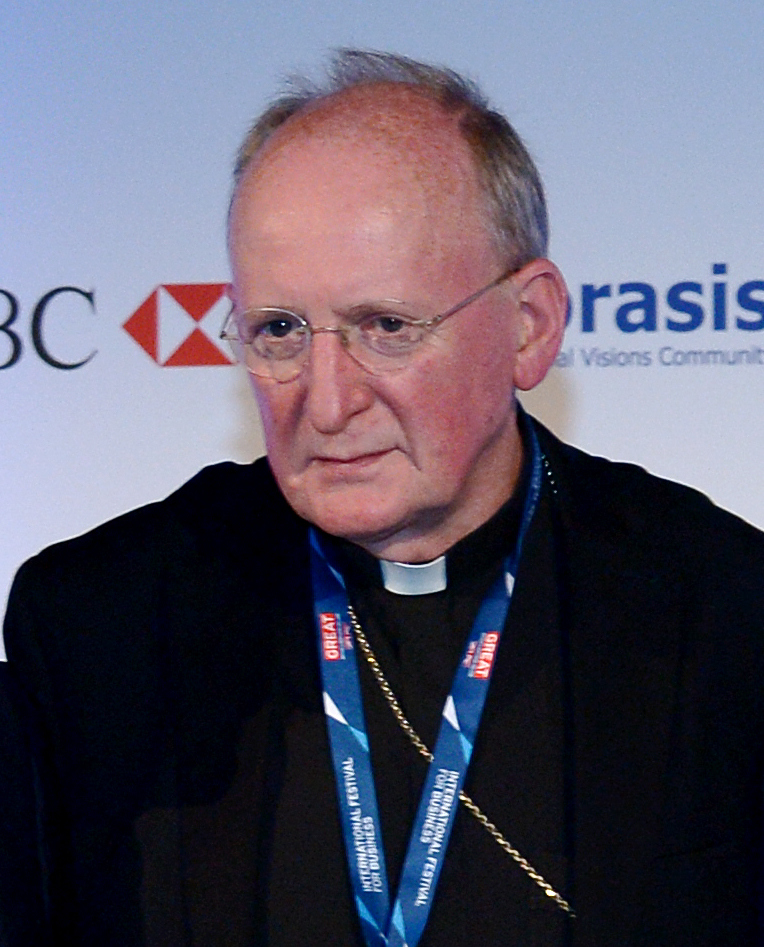
- Williams in 2016
- Church: Roman Catholic Church
- Archdiocese: Archdiocese of Liverpool
- Province: Province of Liverpool
- Other post: Apostolic Administrator of the Archdiocese of Liverpool (2013–2014)

Personal details
- Born: 10 February 1948 (age 78) Liverpool, England
- Denomination: Catholicism
- Education: English College, Lisbon

Styles of Thomas Williams
- Reference style: The Right Reverend
- Spoken style: My Lord
- Religious style: Monsignor

Ordination history of Thomas
History
Priestly ordination
- Ordained by: George Andrew Beck
- Date: 27 May 1972
- Place: Liverpool Metropolitan Cathedral of Christ the King
Episcopal consecration
- Principal consecrator: Patrick Kelly
- Co-consecrators: Vincent Malone; Augustine Harris
- Date: May 27, 2003

Thomas Anthony Williams (born 10 February 1948) is an English prelate of the Roman Catholic Church. Until his retirement on 25 March 2023 he served as Auxiliary Bishop of the Archdiocese of Liverpool.

== Early life and ministry ==
Tom Williams was born on Shrove Tuesday, 10 February 1948, in Liverpool. He entered Junior Seminary to train for the priesthood at Christleton Hall, Chester in 1961, before studying at the English College in Lisbon, Portugal, from September 1966 to 1971. He completed his studies at St Joseph's College, Up Holland. Williams was ordained to the priesthood on 27 May 1972, at the Liverpool Metropolitan Cathedral, by Archbishop George Andrew Beck.

He served at several parishes, including: St Francis of Assisi, Garston; Sacred Heart, Liverpool (where he was also Chaplain to the Royal Liverpool Hospital); Our Lady of Walsingham, Netherton; Our Lady Immaculate, Liverpool and St Anthony's, Scotland Road, Liverpool.

== Episcopal career ==
On 15 April 2003, Williams was appointed Auxiliary Bishop of Liverpool and Titular Bishop of Mageo by Pope John Paul II. He received his episcopal consecration on the following 27 May from Archbishop Patrick Kelly, with Bishops Vincent Malone and Augustine Harris serving as co-consecrators.

On 27 May 2012 Bishop Williams celebrated the Ruby Jubilee of his ordination to the priesthood. It also marked the ninth anniversary of his Episcopal Ordination as Bishop of Mageo and Auxiliary Bishop of Liverpool in the same Cathedral by Archbishop Patrick Kelly on 27 May 2003.

As Auxiliary Bishop of Liverpool he also served as Chair of the Healthcare Reference Group of the Bishops' Conference of England and Wales.

Williams resigned from the office of Auxiliary Bishop of Liverpool in March 2023, upon reaching the age of 75 years. He is now known as Auxiliary Bishop Emeritus.

== Honours ==
- He was awarded the Freedom of the City of Liverpool on 30 September 2021.

Catholic Church titles
Preceded by Vincent Malone	Titular Bishop of Mageo; 2003–Present	Incumbent
