= List of Catholic bishops in Great Britain =

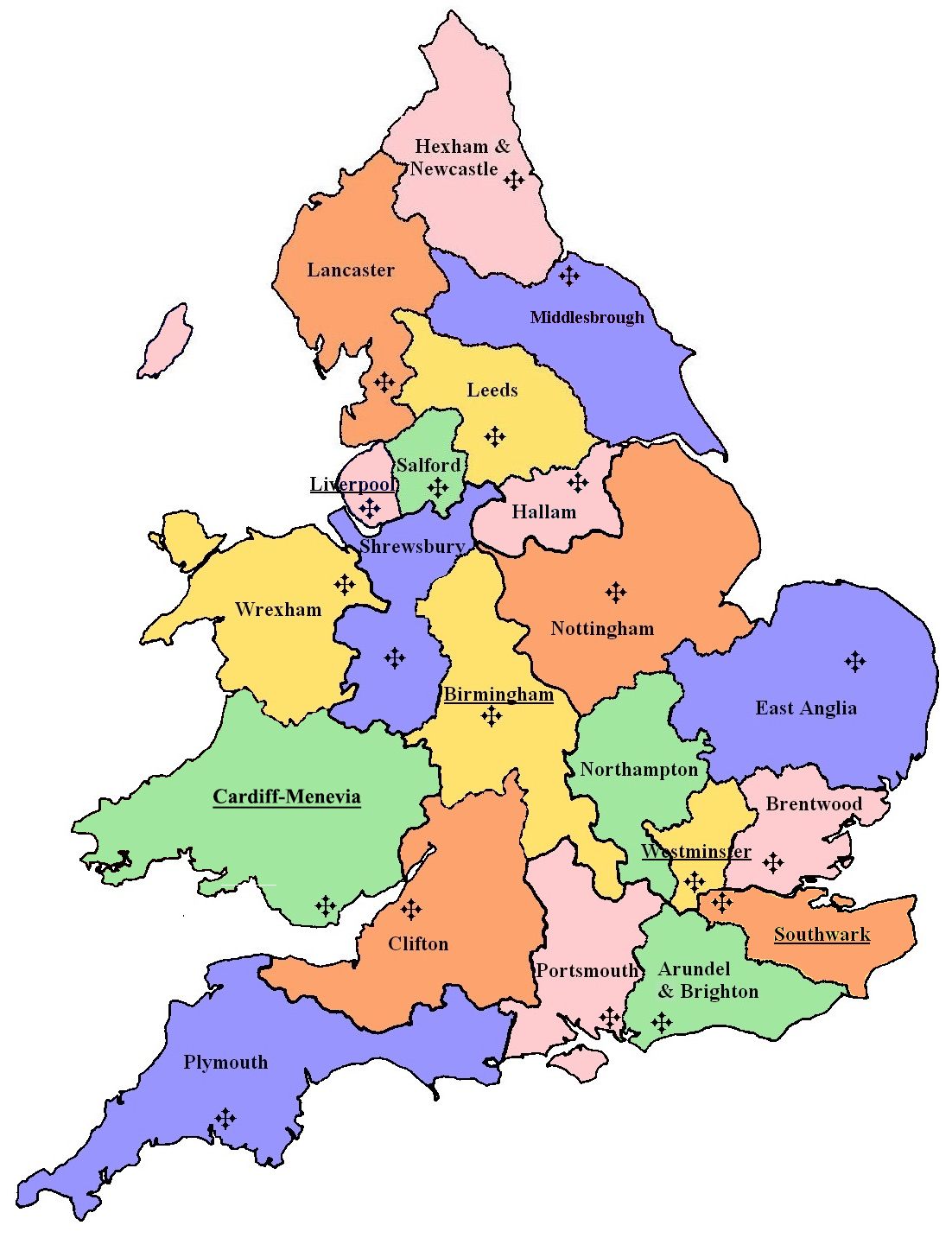
Map of dioceses in England and Wales.

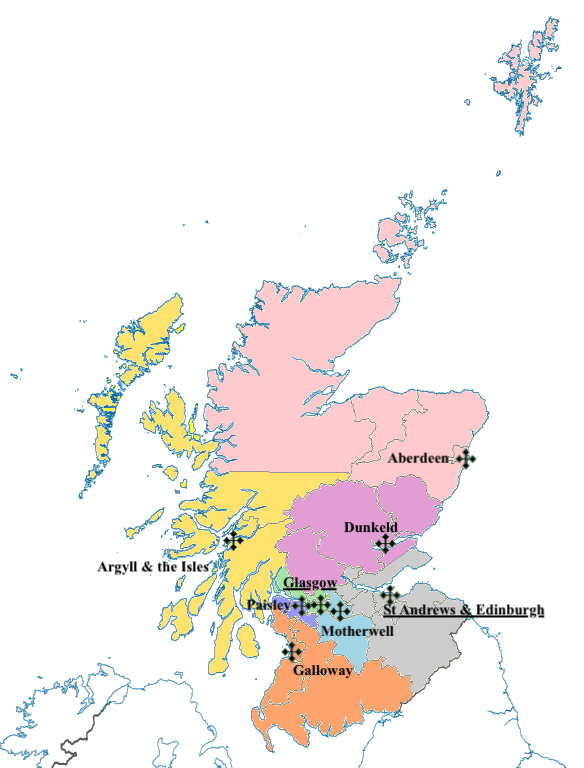
Map of dioceses in Scotland.

The following is a list of bishops of the Catholic Church in Great Britain.

The Catholic Church in Great Britain comprises:

- 29 Latin Church dioceses in seven ecclesiastical provinces that cover England, Wales, and Scotland.
- one eparchy of the Ukrainian Greek Catholic Church that covers the entirety of Great Britain.
- one eparchy of the Syro-Malabar Catholic Church that covers the entirety of Great Britain.
- the Bishopric of the Forces in Great Britain, for members and families of the British Armed Forces in the United Kingdom and on overseas postings.
- the Personal Ordinariate of Our Lady of Walsingham, for former Anglicans who have converted to the Roman Catholic Church.

The Catholic Bishops' Conference of England and Wales (CBCEW) consists of all the archbishops, bishops, and auxiliary bishops throughout England and Wales. It also includes the Bishop of the Forces, the Eparch of the Ukrainian Church in Great Britain, the Eparch for Syro-Malabar Catholics in Great Britain, the Ordinary of the Personal Ordinariate of Our Lady of Walsingham, the Bishop of Gibraltar, and the Apostolic Prefect of the Falkland Islands.

The Bishops' Conference of Scotland comprises all archbishops, bishops, and auxiliary bishops in Scotland.

== Archbishops and bishops ==
The 29 Latin Church dioceses in Great Britain are divided into seven ecclesiastical provinces. The Catholic Church in England and Wales has five provinces that are subdivided into 21 dioceses, while the Catholic Church in Scotland has two provinces that are subdivided into eight dioceses. Each province consists of a metropolitan archdiocese that is led by an archbishop. Under each archdiocese is at least one suffragan diocese, which is led by a bishop. Many archdioceses also have auxiliary bishops who assist the diocesan bishop.

All archbishops and bishops are appointed by the pope. The pope selects from a list of candidates that is provided by the Apostolic Nuncio to Great Britain.

== Popes ==
Pope Adrian IV, born Nicholas Breakspear, is the only British-born pope in history. He became pope in 1154, serving until his death in 1159.

== Cardinals ==
Currently, there are four British cardinals.

Cardinal	Title	Year appointed	Ref.
Vincent Nichols	Archbishop Emeritus of Westminster	2014	
Michael Fitzgerald	Apostolic Nuncio Emeritus to Egypt	2019	
Arthur Roche	Prefect of the Dicastery for Divine Worship and the Discipline of the Sacraments	2022	
Timothy Radcliffe	Master Emeritus of the Order of Preachers	2024	

== Latin church archbishops and bishops ==
Episcopal Conference of England and Wales

Ecclesiastical province map	Archdiocese or diocese	Diocese's coat of arms	Archbishop or bishop	Title	Bishop's coat of arms	Ref.
=== Ecclesiastical Province of Birmingham ===
	Archdiocese of Birmingham		Bernard Longley	Archbishop of Birmingham		
	Archdiocese of Birmingham		David Evans	Auxiliary Bishop of Birmingham		
	Archdiocese of Birmingham		Timothy Menezes	Auxiliary Bishop of Birmingham		
	Archdiocese of Birmingham		Richard Walker	Auxiliary Bishop of Birmingham		
	Diocese of Clifton		Bosco MacDonald	Bishop of Clifton		
	Diocese of Shrewsbury		Mark Davies	Bishop of Shrewsbury		
=== Ecclesiastical Province of Cardiff-Menevia ===
	Archdiocese of Cardiff-Menevia		Mark O'Toole	Archbishop of Cardiff-Menevia		
	Diocese of Wrexham		Peter Brignall	Bishop of Wrexham		
=== Ecclesiastical Province of Liverpool ===
	Archdiocese of Liverpool		John Sherrington	Archbishop of Liverpool		
	Archdiocese of Liverpool		Thomas Neylon	Auxiliary Bishop of Liverpool		
	Diocese of Hallam		Ralph Heskett	Bishop of Hallam		
	Diocese of Hexham and Newcastle		Stephen Wright	Bishop of Hexham and Newcastle		
	Diocese of Lancaster		Paul Swarbrick	Bishop of Lancaster		
	Diocese of Leeds		Marcus Stock	Bishop of Leeds		
	Diocese of Middlesbrough		sede vacante	Bishop of Middlesbrough		
	Diocese of Salford		John Arnold	Bishop of Salford		
=== Ecclesiastical Province of Southwark ===
	Archdiocese of Southwark		John Wilson	Archbishop of Southwark		
	Archdiocese of Southwark		Paul Hendricks	Auxiliary Bishop of Southwark		
	Diocese of Arundel and Brighton		sede vacante	Bishop of Arundel and Brighton		
	Diocese of Plymouth		Nicholas Hudson	Bishop of Plymouth		
	Diocese of Portsmouth		Philip Egan	Bishop of Portsmouth		
=== Ecclesiastical Province of Westminster ===
	Archdiocese of Westminster		Richard Moth	Archbishop of Westminster		
	Archdiocese of Westminster		Paul McAleenan	Auxiliary Bishop of Westminster		
	Archdiocese of Westminster		James Curry	Auxiliary Bishop of Westminster		
	Diocese of Brentwood		Alan Williams	Bishop of Brentwood		
	Diocese of East Anglia		Peter Collins	Bishop of East Anglia		
	Diocese of Northampton		David Oakley	Bishop of Northampton		
	Diocese of Nottingham		Patrick McKinney	Bishop of Nottingham		

Episcopal Conference of Scotland

Ecclesiastical province map	Archdiocese or diocese	Diocese's coat of arms	Archbishop or bishop	Title	Bishop's coat of arms	Ref.
=== Ecclesiastical Province of Saint Andrews and Edinburgh ===
	Archdiocese of St Andrews and Edinburgh		Leo Cushley	Archbishop of St Andrews and Edinburgh		
	Diocese of Aberdeen		Hugh Gilbert	Bishop of Aberdeen		
	Diocese of Argyll and the Isles		Brian McGee	Bishop of Argyll & the Isles		
	Diocese of Dunkeld		Andrew McKenzie	Bishop of Dunkeld		
	Diocese of Galloway		Francis Dougan	Bishop of Galloway		
=== Ecclesiastical Province of Glasgow ===
	Archdiocese of Glasgow		William Nolan	Archbishop of Glasgow		
	Diocese of Motherwell		Joseph Toal	Bishop of Motherwell		
	Diocese of Paisley		John Keenan	Bishop of Paisley		

=== Immediately subject to the Holy See ===
The following dioceses do not fall directly under an Ecclesiastical Province, although they may be associated with one, but are immediately subject to the Holy See.

Ecclesiastical province map	Archdiocese or diocese	Diocese's coat of arms	Archbishop or bishop	Title	Bishop's coat of arms	Ref.
==== Bishopric of the Forces in Great Britain ====
	Bishopric of the Forces in Great Britain		Paul Mason	Bishop of the Forces		
==== Personal Ordinariate of Our Lady of Walsingham ====
	Personal Ordinariate of Our Lady of Walsingham		David Waller	Bishop of the Personal Ordinariate of Our Lady of Walsingham		

=== Bishops emeriti ===
Province	Bishop	Title	Diocese
Birmingham	Philip Pargeter	auxiliary bishop emeritus	Archdiocese of Birmingham
Birmingham	Leonard William Kenny	auxiliary bishop emeritus	Archdiocese of Birmingham
Birmingham	Declan Lang	bishop emeritus	Diocese of Clifton
Cardiff-Menevia	George Stack	archbishop emeritus	Archdiocese of Cardiff-Menevia
Cardiff-Menevia	Tom Burns	bishop emeritus	Diocese of Menevia
Cardiff-Menevia	Edwin Regan	bishop emeritus	Diocese of Wrexham
Liverpool	Patrick Kelly	archbishop emeritus	Archdiocese of Liverpool
Liverpool	Malcolm McMahon	archbishop emeritus	Archdiocese of Liverpool
Liverpool	Tom Williams	auxiliary bishop emeritus	Archdiocese of Liverpool
Liverpool	John Rawsthorne	bishop emeritus	Diocese of Hallam
Liverpool	Robert Byrne	bishop emeritus	Diocese of Hexham and Newcastle
Liverpool	Séamus Cunningham	bishop emeritus	Diocese of Hexham and Newcastle
Liverpool	Michael Campbell	bishop emeritus	Diocese of Lancaster
Liverpool	Arthur Roche	bishop emeritus	Diocese of Leeds
Liverpool	John Crowley	bishop emeritus	Diocese of Middlesbrough
Liverpool	Terry Drainey	bishop emeritus	Diocese of Middlesbrough
Liverpool	Terence Brain	bishop emeritus	Diocese of Salford
Southwark	Kevin McDonald	archbishop emeritus	Archdiocese of Southwark
Southwark	Patrick Lynch	auxiliary bishop emeritus	Archdiocese of Southwark
Southwark	Kieran Conry	bishop emeritus	Diocese of Arundel and Brighton
Southwark	Crispian Hollis	bishop emeritus	Diocese of Portsmouth
Westminster	Vincent Nichols	archbishop emeritus	Archdiocese of Westminster
Westminster	Alan Hopes	bishop emeritus	Diocese of East Anglia
Westminster	Peter Doyle	bishop emeritus	Diocese of Northampton
Saint Andrews and Edinburgh	Peter Moran	bishop emeritus	Diocese of Aberdeen
Saint Andrews and Edinburgh	Stephen Robson	bishop emeritus	Diocese of Dunkeld
Personal Ordinariate	Keith Newton	ordinary emeritus	Personal Ordinariate of Our Lady of Walsingham

== Eastern Catholic eparchs ==
=== British eparchies that are immediately subject to the Holy See ===
Church	Archeparchy or eparchy	Eparchy's coat of arms	Archeparch or eparch	Title	Eparch's coat of arms	Ref.
Ukrainian Greek Catholic Church	Eparchy of the Holy Family of London		Kenneth Nowakowski	Eparch of the Holy Family of London		
Syro-Malabar Catholic Church	Syro-Malabar Catholic Eparchy of Great Britain		Joseph Srampickal	Syro-Malabar Bishop of Great Britain		

=== Eparchs emeriti ===
Eparchs/ Bishops	Title	Eparchy
Hlib Lonchyna	bishop emeritus	Eparchy of the Holy Family of London

== See also ==
- Catholic Church in England and Wales
- Catholic Church in Scotland
- Hierarchy of the Catholic Church
- List of Catholic churches in the United Kingdom
- List of Catholic dioceses in Great Britain
- List of Catholic archdioceses
- List of Catholic dioceses (alphabetical)
- List of Catholic dioceses (structured view)
- List of Catholic titular sees
