= Richard Downey =

English prelate

The Most Reverend Richard Downey
- Archbishop of Liverpool
- Archdiocese: Liverpool
- See: Liverpool
- Appointed: 3 August 1928
- Installed: 21 September 1928
- Term ended: 16 June 1953
- Predecessor: Frederick William Keating
- Successor: William Godfrey

Orders
- Ordination: 25 May 1907 by Thomas Whiteside
- Consecration: 21 September 1928 by Francis Alphonsus Bourne

Personal details
- Born: 5 May 1881 Kilkenny, Ireland
- Died: 16 June 1953 (aged 72) Liverpool, United Kingdom
- Denomination: Roman Catholic

Richard Downey (5 May 1881 – 16 June 1953) was an English prelate of the Roman Catholic Church. He served as Archbishop of Liverpool from 1928 until his death.

== Life ==
Born in Kilkenny, he was ordained to the priesthood on 25 May 1907. He was Professor of Philosophy at Sacred Heart College, Hammersmith, and then Professor of Dogmatic Theology at Upholland College, where he was also Vice-Rector. On 3 August 1928, Downey was appointed Archbishop of Liverpool by Pope Pius XI, succeeding the late Frederick William Keating. He received his Episcopal consecration on the following 21 September from Cardinal Francis Bourne, with Bishops Robert Dobson and Francis Vaughan serving as co-consecrators.

Downey's tenure saw the construction and dedication of the crypt of Liverpool Cathedral, built to a design by Sir Edwin Lutyens, although the Cathedral itself was never completed as he had envisaged. A picture of Lutyens proposed cathedral was printed on postcards sold to raise funds.

In 1929, before the actual construction began, he stated, "Hitherto all cathedrals have been dedicated to saints. I hope this one will be dedicated to Christ himself with a great figure surmounted on the cathedral, visible for many a mile out at sea". The Archbishop also declared that while the cathedral would not be medieval and Gothic, neither would it be as modern as the works of Jacob Epstein, a statement somewhat at odds with the design that was finally realised after his death.

In 1933, after the urn containing the bones of King Edward V and Richard, Duke of York was removed from Westminster Abbey for examination and then returned with an Anglican burial service, Archbishop Downey said, "It is difficult to see what moral justification there can be for reading a Protestant service over the remains of these Roman Catholic princes, even though it were done on the plea of legal continuity of the present Anglican Church with the pre-Reformation Church of Britain".

He died at age 72, having served as Liverpool's archbishop for twenty-four years.

== Publications ==
- Some Errors of H. G. Wells: A Catholic's Criticism of the "Outline of History" (1921)
- Divine Providence (1928)
- The Blessed Trinity (1930)
- Pulpit and Platform Addresses (1933)
- Critical and Constructive Essays (1934)

Preceded by Frederick William Keating	Archbishop of Liverpool; 1928–1953	Succeeded by William Godfrey
