= Henry Banister =

Henry Banister may refer to:

- Henry Banister (politician) (c. 1538–1628), English politician
- Henry Charles Banister (1831–1897), English composer, music theorist and author
- Henry Rutter (1755–1838), né Banister, English Roman Catholic priest
