= Bernard O'Reilly =

Bernard O'Reilly may refer to:

- Bernard O'Reilly (writer) (1903–1975), Australian author and bushman
- Bernard O'Reilly (bishop of Hartford) (1803–1856), Roman Catholic bishop
- Bernard O'Reilly (bishop of Liverpool) (1824–1894), Roman Catholic bishop
