= See of Liverpool =

See of Liverpool may refer to:

- Anglican Diocese of Liverpool
- Roman Catholic Archdiocese of Liverpool

== See also ==
- Episcopal see
