= Alexander Goss =

English Catholic Bishop (1814-1872)

Alexander Goss (5 July 1814 — 3 October 1872) was the second Bishop of the Roman Catholic Diocese of Liverpool.

== Biography ==
Alexander Goss was born on July 5, 1814 at Ormskirk, Lancashire of recusant background, connected on both sides with old Lancashire families who had always been Catholics; his father was descended from the Gooses or Gosses, his mother from the Rutters. His maternal uncle, the well-known priest, Rev. Henry Rutter, sent him to Ushaw College, 20 June 1827, where he distinguished himself as a student. When he had completed his philosophy course he was appointed as a "minor professor" to teach one of the classes in the humanity schools. On the death of his uncle, he spent the legacy he received, in going to Rome, where he studied theology at the English College, and was ordained priest on 4 July 1841.

On his return to England, early in March, 1842, he was sent to St. Wilfrids Church, Manchester, but in the following October he was appointed vice-president of the newly founded college of St. Edward, Everton, near Liverpool. Fr. Goss held this office until he was chosen coadjutor-bishop to Dr. Brown, ten years later. He was consecrated by Cardinal Wiseman, at Liverpool, 25 September 1853, and as there was no pressing need of his services, he took the opportunity to pay a long visit to Rome. From 1853 he was Titular Bishop of Geras until, on 25 January 1856, he became Bishop of Liverpool by the death of Dr. Brown.

In politics, he followed the Conservative Party. Under his firm administration, Catholicity made great advances, many churches and schools were built, and the bishop proved an unflinching champion of Catholic education. His fearless denunciation of social evils, and his outspoken expression of opinion attracted the notice of the Press, and even The Times devoted special attention to his speeches.

== Affiliations ==
He was an accomplished scholar, not only in theology, but also in archæology, and he was an active member of the Chetham Holbein and Manx societies. For the first he edited "Abbott's Journal" and "The Tryalls at Manchester in 1694" (1864); for the Manx Society, Chronica Regum Manniæ et Insularum, with P. A. Munch, to which he made valuable additions. An account of Harkirke burial-ground for recusants, and an introduction written by him were published by the Chetham Society in Crosby Records (M.S., 12, 1887).

He collected materials for a history of Catholicity in the north, and edited Claude-Joseph Drioux's "Sacred History, comprising the leading facts of the Old and New Testament". For many years he suffered so much that his friend, Rev. T.E. Gibson, wrote of him (Lydiate Hall and its Associations, Introd.): "A prey to disease during the greater part of his episcopate, his life was the struggle of a fearless soul with bodily ailments and with the harassing mental anxieties incidental to his position."

Bishop Goss died suddenly at St. Edward's College on 3 October 1872, aged 58.

There are two paintings of the bishop at St. Edward's College, Liverpool.

== Sources ==
- Catholic Hierarchy: Alexander Goss

Catholic Church titles
Preceded by George Hilary Brown	Bishop of Liverpool; 1856–1872	Succeeded by Bernard O’Reilly
