= William Godfrey =

English Cardinal of the Roman Catholic Church

His Eminence William Godfrey
- Cardinal, Archbishop of Westminster
- Godfrey in 1962
- Province: Westminster
- Diocese: Westminster
- Appointed: 3 December 1956
- Term ended: 22 January 1963
- Predecessor: Bernard Griffin
- Successor: John Carmel Heenan
- Other posts: Cardinal-Priest of Santi Nereo ed Achilleo; Apostolic Exarch of England and Wales
- Previous posts: Titular Archbishop of Cius (1938-1953); Apostolic Delegate to Great Britain (1938-1953); Official to Poland (1943-1953); Archbishop of Liverpool (1953–1956)

Orders
- Ordination: 28 October 1916 by Antonio Vico
- Consecration: 21 December 1938 by Raffaele Carlo Rossi, Luigi Traglia, Ralph Leo Hayes
- Created cardinal: 15 December 1958 by John XXIII
- Rank: Cardinal-Priest

Personal details
- Born: 25 July 1889 Liverpool, England
- Died: 22 January 1963 (aged 73) London, England
- Buried: Westminster Cathedral
- Denomination: Roman Catholic
- Parents: George and Mary Godfrey
- Coat of arms

William Godfrey (25 July 1889 – 22 January 1963) was an English Cardinal of the Roman Catholic Church. He served as Archbishop of Westminster from 1956 until his death, and was elevated to the cardinalate in 1958.

== Biography ==
William Godfrey was born in Liverpool to George and Mary Godfrey. His father was a haulage contractor. He leaned towards the priesthood from an early age, never taking any alternative into serious consideration. After studying at Ushaw College, Durham, and the English College, Rome, he was ordained a priest on 28 October 1916 in Rome. He then finished his studies in 1918, obtaining his doctorates in theology and philosophy in 1917, and did pastoral work in Liverpool until 1919. He taught Classics, Philosophy and Theology at Ushaw from 1918 to 1930, the year when he was appointed rector of the English College, Rome and given the title Monsignor (28 October). At the college, the strict priest was known to his students as "Uncle Bill". In 1935, Godfrey was made a member of the Pontifical Commission to Malta, and attended in an official capacity the 1937 coronation of King George VI and Queen Elizabeth.

On 21 November 1938, Mgr Godfrey was appointed Titular Archbishop of Cius and first Apostolic Delegate to Great Britain, Gibraltar and Malta. Godfrey, who was the first papal representative to England since the Reformation, received his episcopal consecration on the following 21 December, in the chapel of the English College from Cardinal Raffaele Rossi, OCD, with Archbishop Luigi Traglia and Bishop Ralph Hayes serving as co-consecrators. He was also chargé d'affaires of the Holy See to the Polish government-in-exile in London in 1943. He left these diplomatic posts on 10 November 1953 when he was made Archbishop of Liverpool.

Pope Pius XII appointed Godfrey Archbishop of Westminster, and thus the ranking prelate of the Catholic Church in England and Wales, on 3 December 1956. During his installation, Godfrey condemned Communism and professed his mission as bringing England "back to the love of Christ". He was vehemently opposed to birth control. At one point in his tenure, he caused some mirth by calling for English Catholics to feed their pets less during Lent.

Archbishop Godfrey was created Cardinal-Priest by Pope John XXIII in the consistory of 15 December 1958 and was assigned the title of Ss. Nereo ed Achilleo.

Godfrey, who enjoyed the piano and sports, lived long enough to attend only the first session of the Second Vatican Council in 1962. In January 1963, he died from a heart attack in London, at age 73. He is buried in Westminster Cathedral. His likeness was sculpted by Arthur Fleischmann.

Catholic Church titles
Preceded by Richard Downey	Archbishop of Liverpool; 1953–1956	Succeeded by John Carmel Heenan
Preceded by Bernard Griffin	Archbishop of Westminster; 1956–1963	Succeeded by John Carmel Heenan
Preceded by Celso Benigno Luigi Costantini	Cardinal-Priest of Ss. Nereo ed Achilleo; 1958–1963	Succeeded by Thomas Cooray
