= Thomas Whiteside (bishop) =

English prelate

The Right Reverend Thomas Whiteside
- Bishop of Liverpool
- Church: Roman Catholic Church
- Diocese: Liverpool
- Appointed: 12 July 1894
- Term ended: 28 January 1921
- Predecessor: Bernard O'Reilly
- Successor: Frederick Keating

Orders
- Ordination: 30 May 1885 (priest)
- Consecration: 15 August 1894 by Herbert Vaughan

Personal details
- Born: 17 April 1857 Lancaster, Lancashire, England
- Died: 28 January 1921 (aged 63) Liverpool, England
- Denomination: Roman Catholic

Thomas Whiteside (17 April 1857 – 28 January 1921) was an English prelate of the Roman Catholic Church. He served as the fourth Bishop of Liverpool (1894–1911) before being elevated to Archbishop of Liverpool (1911–1921).

Thomas Whiteside was born in Lancaster, Lancashire on 17 April 1857, the son of Robert and Isabella Whiteside, of St George's Quay. He attended the local parochial school, and was an altar boy at St. Peter's Church.

Whiteside was ordained to the priesthood on 30 May 1885 at St. John's Lateran in Rome, and served as president of the diocesan seminary, St Joseph's College, Up Holland.

He was appointed the Bishop of the Diocese of Liverpool on 12 July 1894. His consecration to the Episcopate took place on 15 August 1894, the principal consecrator was Cardinal Herbert Vaughan, Archbishop of Westminster, and the principal co-consecrators were Bishop William Gordon of Leeds and Bishop John Bilsborrow of Salford. Whiteside became the Metropolitan Archbishop of Liverpool on 28 October 1911 when the diocese was elevated to the status of a metropolitan archdiocese. He died in office on 28 January 1921, aged 63. He is buried at the Metropolitan Cathedral of Christ the King.

Catholic Church titles
Preceded by Bernard O’Reilly	Bishop of Liverpool; 1894–1911	Title elevated
New title	Archbishop of Liverpool; 1911–1921	Succeeded by Frederick William Keating
