= Patrick Kelly (archbishop of Liverpool) =

English prelate

The Most Reverend Patrick Kelly KC*HS
- Archbishop Emeritus of Liverpool
- Church: Roman Catholic Church
- Archdiocese: Archdiocese of Liverpool
- Province: Province of Liverpool
- Appointed: 21 May 1996
- Installed: 3 July 1996
- Term ended: 27 February 2013
- Predecessor: Derek Worlock
- Successor: Malcolm McMahon OP
- Previous post: Bishop of Salford (1984–1996)

Orders
- Ordination: 18 February 1962 by William Godfrey
- Consecration: 3 April 1984 by Thomas Holland

Personal details
- Born: Patrick Altham Kelly; 23 November 1938 (age 87) Morecambe, Lancashire, England
- Denomination: Roman Catholic Church

Patrick Altham Kelly PHL KC*HS (born 23 November 1938) is an English prelate of the Roman Catholic Church. He is the archbishop emeritus of the Archdiocese of Liverpool following his resignation which took effect on 27 February 2013; he was formerly Vice President of the Catholic Bishops' Conference of England and Wales.

== Early life ==
Kelly was born in Morecambe, Lancashire, educated at Preston Catholic College, and was ordained to the priesthood on 18 February 1962, at the Venerable English College, in Rome.

== Parishes ==
Kelly taught systematic theology in Oscott Seminary and in 1978 became the Seminary's rector.

On 9 March 1984, Kelly was appointed Bishop of Salford by Pope John Paul II. He ordained to the episcopate on the following 3 April by Bishop Thomas Holland, the co-consecrators being archbishops Derek Worlock and Maurice Couve de Murville. Kelly was to be appointed Archbishop of Liverpool by Pope John Paul II on 21 May 1996.

In early 2012, Kelly celebrated the Golden Jubilee of his priestly ordination. He began the celebrations with a Mass at the local Carmelite convent and on the following day there was a solemn Mass in Liverpool Metropolitan Cathedral. The Mass was concelebrated, among others, by Cardinals Cormac Murphy-O'Connor and Jean-Louis Tauran, by the papal nuncios to Britain and Guatemala, Archbishops Mennini and Gallagher, along with Archbishop (later Cardinal) Vincent Nichols.

In his leisure time Kelly is said to enjoy listening to classical music and attending concerts, especially those given by the Royal Liverpool Philharmonic Orchestra.

On the morning of 10 December 2012, Kelly was admitted to hospital after suffering a mild stroke, his condition being described at the time as "comfortable".

Given the suffering caused by the stroke, Kelly was advised to take a lengthy period of convalescence, which he spent in Lancashire. Although he still had a year left in office before he was required by canon law to tender his resignation, it was announced on Monday 7 January 2013, that he had chosen to submit his resignation to Pope Benedict XVI, and on 27 February 2013 the Pope's acceptance was made public. On 21 March 2014, Malcolm McMahon, Bishop of Nottingham, was appointed by Pope Francis to succeed Kelly as Archbishop of Liverpool.

== Later life ==
Kelly is now residing at Hesketh Park Lodge Care Home in Southport and continues to share his faith with other residents, team members and visitors.

== SSPX ==
Kelly was opposed to making agreements with the Society of Saint Pius X, citing the need to defend the legacy of the Second Vatican Council.

Catholic Church titles
Preceded by Thomas Holland	Bishop of Salford; 1984–1996	Succeeded by Terence Brain
Preceded by Derek Worlock	Archbishop of Liverpool; 1996–2013	Succeeded by Malcolm McMahon
