= Frederick Keating =

English prelate

The Right Reverend Frederick William Keating
- Bishop of Liverpool
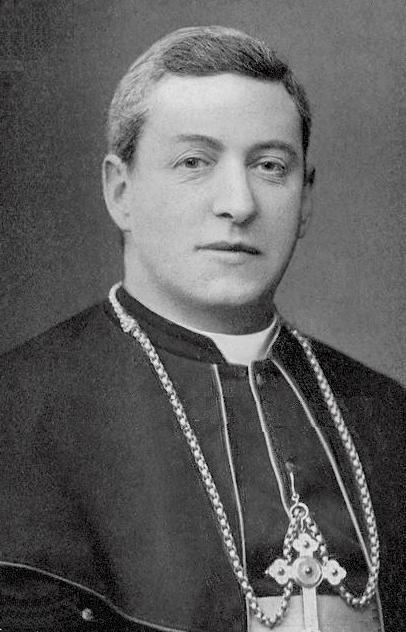
- Bishop Frederick Keating
- Church: Roman Catholic Church
- Diocese: Liverpool
- Appointed: 13 June 1921
- Term ended: 7 February 1928
- Predecessor: Thomas Whiteside
- Successor: Richard Downey

Orders
- Ordination: 20 October 1882 (priest)
- Consecration: 25 February 1908 -for Northhanpton by Francis Bourne

Personal details
- Born: 13 June 1859 Birmingham, England
- Died: 7 February 1928 (aged 68)
- Denomination: Roman Catholic

Frederick William Keating (13 June 1859 – 7 February 1928) was an English prelate of the Roman Catholic Church. He served first as Bishop of Northampton from 1908 to 1921, then Archbishop of Liverpool from 1921 to 1928.

== Biography ==
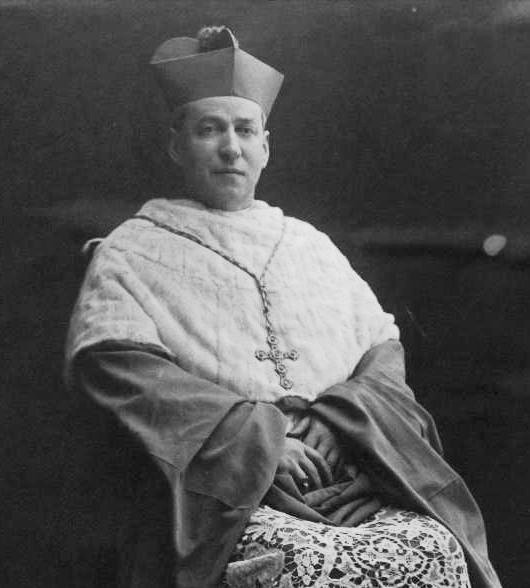
Keating as Archbishop of Liverpool

Born in Birmingham on 13 June 1859, he was ordained to the priesthood at St Bernard's Catholic Seminary in Olton on 20 October 1882. He was appointed the Bishop of the Diocese of Northampton on 5 February 1908. His consecration to the Episcopate took place ar St Chad's Cathedral, Birmingham on 25 February 1908; the principal consecrator was Cardinal Francis Bourne, Archbishop of Westminster, and the principal co-consecrators were Bishop George Burton of Clifton and Bishop Joseph Cowgill of Leeds.

Keating was translated to the Archdiocese of Liverpool as archbishop on 13 June 1921. He supported the workers in the General Strike of 1926.

He died in office on 7 February 1928, aged 68.

Catholic Church titles
Preceded by Arthur George Riddell	Bishop of Northampton; 1908–1921	Succeeded by Dudley Charles Cary-Elwes
Preceded by Thomas Whiteside	Archbishop of Liverpool; 1921–1928	Succeeded by Richard Downey
