= Archbishop of Liverpool =

Roman Catholic bishop in UK

- Archbishopric

catholic
- Incumbent; John Sherrington

Location
- Ecclesiastical province: Province of Liverpool

Information
- Established: Bishopric in 1850; Archbishopric in 1911
- Archdiocese: Archdiocese of Liverpool
- Cathedral: Metropolitan Cathedral of Christ the King, Liverpool

Website
- Archbishop of Liverpool

The Metropolitan Archbishop of Liverpool is the ordinary of the Roman Catholic Archdiocese of Liverpool and metropolitan of the Province of Liverpool (also known as the Northern Province) in England.

The archdiocese covers an area of 1,165 km^{2} (450 sq mi) of the west of the County of Lancashire south of the Ribble, parts of Merseyside, Cheshire, Greater Manchester, and the Isle of Man. The see is in the City of Liverpool, where the archbishop's cathedra or seat is located in the Metropolitan Cathedral of Christ the King, which was dedicated on 14 May 1967.

The Archbishop's residence is Archbishop's House, Salisbury Road, Liverpool.

The current archbishop is John Sherrington, who was appointed by Pope Francis on 5th of April 2025. His installation took place at the Metropolitan Cathedral of Christ the King on Tuesday 27th May 2025 .

== History ==
After the Reformation, the Roman Catholic hierarchy in England, Scotland, and Wales was abandoned and became under the authority of prefects and vicars apostolics. In 1688, England and Wales were divided into four apostolic vicariates: the London, Midland, Northern, and Western districts. The Liverpool area came under the Northern District, and it remained until the creation of the Lancashire District in 1840. The Lancashire District consisted of the historic counties of Lancashire and Cheshire, together with the Isle of Man.

On the restoration of the hierarchy in England and Wales in 1850, thirteen dioceses were established. Most of the Lancashire District was replaced by the dioceses of Liverpool and Salford. The new Diocese of Liverpool comprised the hundreds of West Derby, Leyland, Amounderness and Lonsdale in Lancashire, plus the Isle of Man. In its early period, the diocese was a suffragan see of the Archdiocese of Westminster, but it was elevated to the status of a metropolitan archdiocese on 28 October 1911, with the archbishop having jurisdiction over the Province of Liverpool.

== List of Ordinaries of Liverpool ==
=== Roman Catholic Bishops of Liverpool ===
Roman Catholic Bishops of Liverpool
From	Until	Incumbent	Notes
1850	1856	George Hilary Brown	Previously Vicar Apostolic of the Lancashire District (1840–1850). Appointed the first bishop of Liverpool on 29 September 1850. Died in office on 25 January 1856.
1856	1872	Alexander Goss	Appointed Coadjutor Bishop of Liverpool and Titular Bishop of Gerrha on 29 July 1853 and consecrated on 25 September 1853. Succeeded Diocesan Bishop of Liverpool on 25 January 1856. Died in office on 3 October 1872.
1873	1894	Bernard O'Reilly	Appointed bishop on 28 February 1873 and consecrated on 19 March 1873. Died in office on 9 April 1894.
1894	1911	Thomas Whiteside	Appointed bishop on 12 July 1894 and consecrated on 15 August 1894. Elevated from bishop to archbishop on 28 October 1911.

=== Roman Catholic Metropolitan Archbishops of Liverpool ===
Roman Catholic Metropolitan Archbishops of Liverpool
From	Until	Incumbent	Notes
1911	1921	Thomas Whiteside	Elevated from bishop to archbishop on 28 October 1911. Died in office on 28 January 1921.
1921	1928	Frederick William Keating	Previously Bishop of Northampton (1908–1921). Appointed Archbishop of Liverpool on 13 June 1921. Died in office on 7 February 1928.
1928	1953	Richard Downey	Appointed archbishop on 3 August 1928 and consecrated on 21 September 1928. Died in office on 16 June 1953.
1953	1956	William Godfrey	Previously Apostolic Delegate to Great Britain and Chargé d'affaires to the Polish government-in-exile. Appointed Archbishop of Liverpool on 10 November 1953. Translated to the archbishopric of Westminster on 3 December 1956.
1957	1963	John Carmel Heenan	Previously Bishop of Leeds (1951–1957). Appointed Archbishop of Liverpool on 2 May 1957. Translated to the archbishopric of Westminster on 2 September 1963.
1964	1976	George Andrew Beck	Previously Bishop of Salford (1955–1964). Appointed Archbishop of Liverpool on 29 January 1964. Resigned on 7 February 1976 and died on 13 September 1978.
1976	1996	Derek John Harford Worlock	Previously Bishop of Portsmouth (1965–1976). Appointed Archbishop of Liverpool on 7 February 1976. Died in office on 6 February 1996.
1996	2013	Patrick Altham Kelly	Previously Bishop of Salford (1984–1996). Appointed Archbishop of Liverpool on 21 May 1996. Resigned on 27 February 2013.
2014	2025	Malcolm McMahon	Previously Bishop of Nottingham (2000–2014). Appointed Archbishop of Liverpool on 21 March 2014 and was installed on 1 May 2014.
2025	present	John Sherrington	Previously Auxiliary Bishop of the Archdiocese of Westminster (2011-2025). Appointed Archbishop of Liverpool on 5 April 2025.

== Bibliography ==
- Brady, W. Maziere (1876). The Episcopal Succession in England, Scotland and Ireland, A.D. 1400 to 1875. Vol. 3. Rome: Tipografia Della Pace.
- Schofield, Nicholas; Skinner, Gerard (2009). The English Vicars Apostolic. Oxford: Family Publications. ISBN 978-1-907380-01-3.
