= Bernard O'Reilly (bishop of Liverpool) =

Irish-born prelate

The Right Reverend Bernard O'Reilly
- Bishop of Liverpool
- Church: Roman Catholic Church
- Diocese: Liverpool
- Appointed: 28 February 1873
- Term ended: 9 April 1894
- Predecessor: Alexander Goss
- Successor: Thomas Whiteside

Orders
- Ordination: 9 May 1847 (priest) by William Riddell
- Consecration: 19 March 1873 by Henry Edward Manning

Personal details
- Born: 10 January or 10 June 1824 Ballybay, County Monaghan, Ireland
- Died: 9 April 1894 (aged 70)
- Denomination: Roman Catholic
- Education: Ushaw College

Bernard O’Reilly (1824–1894) was an Irish-born prelate who served as the third Roman Catholic Bishop of Liverpool from 1873 until his death in 1894.

== Early life and ministry ==
Born in County Meath on 10 January 1824, Bernard O’Reilly was educated for a short time at (St Finian's College) the Seminary in Navan, County Meath, Ireland. He entered St Cuthbert's College, Ushaw, County Durham, England on 10 June 1836 to continue his training for the priesthood. Whilst at Ushaw, he received the tonsure and the four minor orders from Bishop William Riddell on 15 February 1845. From the same bishop, O'Reilly was ordained a subdeacon on 20 September 1845, a deacon on 19 December 1846, and a priest on 9 May 1847. He left Ushaw on 17 May 1847 and the next day began the mission at St Patrick's, Liverpool. He transferred to the mission at St Vincent de Paul's, Liverpool on 8 December 1852, and appointed a canon of the chapter of Liverpool on 24 December 1860.

== Episcopal career ==
He was appointed the Bishop of the Roman Catholic Diocese of Liverpool by the Holy See on 28 February 1873. His consecration to the Episcopate took place on 19 March 1873, the principal consecrator was Archbishop (later Cardinal) Henry Edward Manning of Westminster, and the principal co-consecrators were Bishop Robert Cornthwaite of Beverley (later Bishop of Leeds) and Bishop James Chadwick of Hexham and Newcastle.

He died in office on 9 April 1894 at St Edward's College, aged 70.

== Bibliography ==
- Brady, W. Maziere (1876). The Episcopal Succession in England, Scotland and Ireland, A.D. 1400 to 1875. Vol. 3. Rome: Tipografia Della Pace.

Catholic Church titles
Preceded by Alexander Goss	Bishop of Liverpool; 1873–1894	Succeeded by Thomas Whiteside
