= Thomas Neylon =

The Right Reverend Thomas Joseph Neylon
- Auxiliary Bishop of Liverpool
- Church: Roman Catholic Church
- Archdiocese: Liverpool
- Province: Liverpool
- See: Plestia
- Appointed: 6 July 2021
- Other post: Titular Bishop of Plestia

Orders
- Ordination: 31 May 1982 by Pope John Paul II
- Consecration: 3 September 2021 by Malcolm McMahon, O.P.

Personal details
- Born: Thomas Joseph Neylon; 16 February 1958 (age 68) Warrington, Lancashire, England
- Denomination: Roman Catholic

Thomas Joseph Neylon (born 16 February 1958) is the Roman Catholic titular bishop of Plestia and Auxiliary Bishop of Liverpool.

Neylon carried out his studies in preparation for the priesthood at Saint Joseph’s College in Upholland and then at Saint Cuthbert’s College in Ushaw. On 31 May 1982 he was ordained a priest at Heaton Park Manchester by Pope John Paul II, during his historic papal visit to Britain, for the Archdiocese of Liverpool.

He subsequently served as parish priest at Saint Cuthbert’s, Wigan (1982-1986) and then in Skelmersdale (1986-1996). Neylon served as parish priest of Saint Julie’s parish in Eccleston, St Helens from 1996 until 2020 and jointly of Saint Teresa of Avila parish in Saint Helens from 2004 until 2018, and at English Martyrs parish in Haydock from 2018 until 2020. He was then appointed as parish priest of St Wilfrid's Catholic parish in Widnes.

In 2006 he became Dean of the pastoral zone of Saint Helens, and in 2007 vicar general. In 2008 he became a member of the Chapter of Canons of the Cathedral of Liverpool.

On 6 July 2021, Pope Francis appointed him Auxiliary Bishop of Liverpool, with the Titular See of Plestia. He was consecrated on 3 September 2021 at Liverpool Metropolitan Cathedral.
