= Vincent Malone =

English bishop (1931–2020)

Styles of Vincent Malone
- Reference style: The Right Reverend
- Spoken style: My Lord
- Religious style: Monsignor

Personal details
- Born: 11 September 1931 Liverpool, England
- Died: 18 May 2020 (aged 88) Liverpool, England

Vincent Malone (11 September 1931 – 18 May 2020) was an English prelate of the Catholic Church. He was the Auxiliary Bishop emeritus of the Archdiocese of Liverpool.

== Life ==
Malone was born in Liverpool, educated at St Francis Xavier's College, and ordained to the priesthood on 18 September 1955, in Old Swan. On 13 May 1989, he was appointed Titular Bishop of Abora and Auxiliary Bishop of Liverpool. He received his episcopal consecration on the following 3 July from Archbishop Derek Worlock, with Bishops Kevin O'Connor and John Rawsthorne serving as co-consecrators.

In 2003 Malone wrote a contribution for Healing Priesthood: Women's Voices Worldwide, in which he argued that women should be allowed to hear confessions and absolve penitents, on the grounds that some Catholics might prefer to confess their sins to a woman.

The Vatican officially announced that on 26 October 2006, Malone was to retire from his post in Liverpool. As with all bishops, he was required to submit his letter of retirement to Pope Benedict XVI upon reaching age 75. He continued to be a Vicar General, a member of the Archbishop's council, and a trustee of the Archdiocese. Moreover, although he no longer carried out formal parish visitations, Malone continued to celebrate the Sacrament of Confirmation.

Malone died on 18 May 2020, aged 88, at the Royal Liverpool Hospital, after testing positive for COVID-19 during the COVID-19 pandemic in England.
