= Archdiocese of Liverpool =

Catholic archdiocese in England

Coordinates: 53°24′17″N 2°58′07″W

Metropolitan Archdiocese of Liverpool Archidioecesis Metropolitae Liverpolitana

Catholic
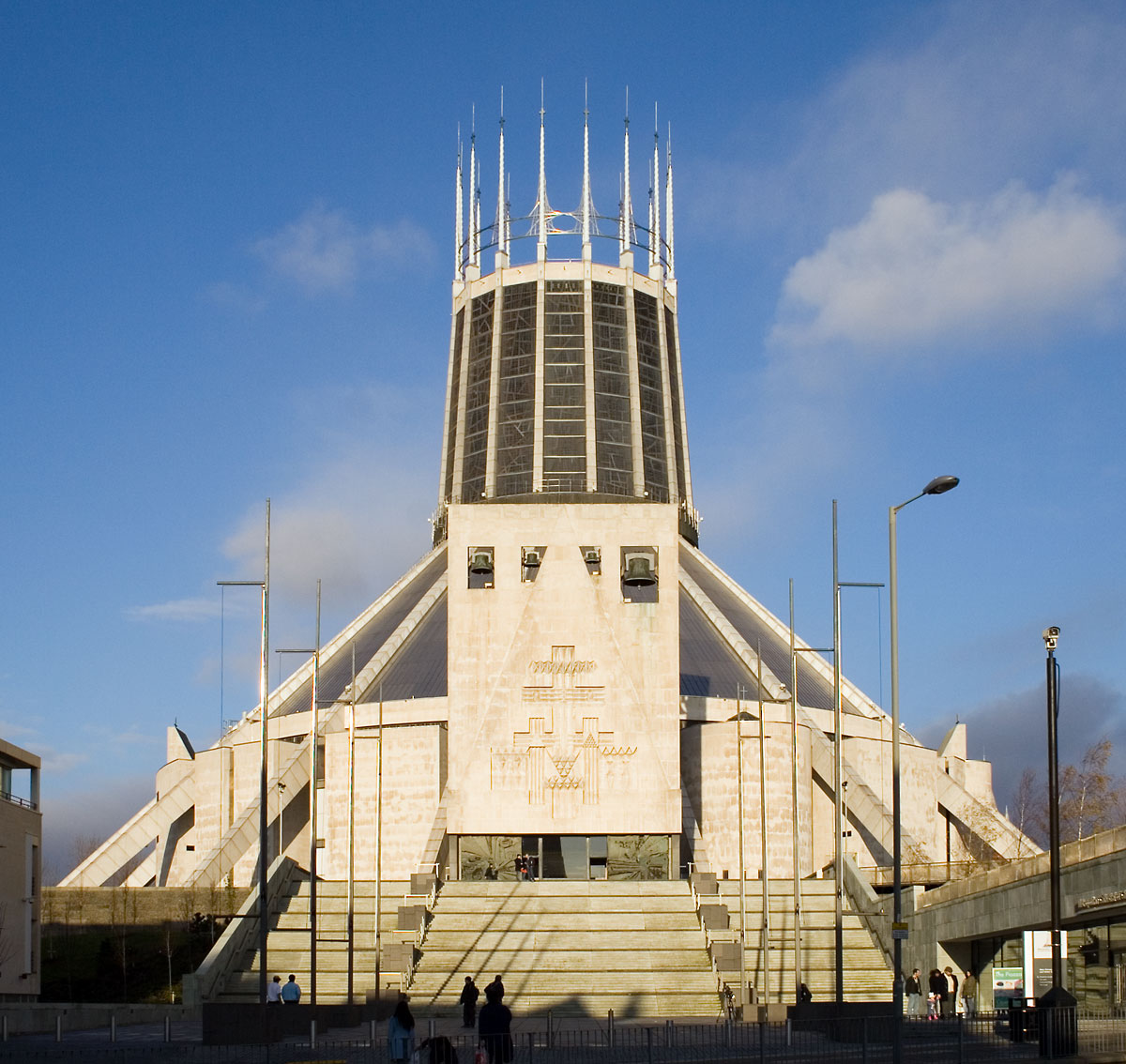
- Liverpool Metropolitan Cathedral

- Coat of arms

Location
- Country: England; Isle of Man
- Territory: Isle of Man; Lancashire (south of the Ribble); With parts of: Merseyside; Cheshire; Greater Manchester
- Episcopal conference: Catholic Bishops' Conference of England and Wales
- Ecclesiastical province: Province of Liverpool
- Deaneries: 13

Statistics
- Area: 1,165 km^{2} (450 sq mi)
- Population: Total; Catholics: (as of 2022); 1,841,000; 505,000 (27.4%)
- Parishes: 140

Information
- Denomination: Catholic
- Sui iuris church: Latin Church
- Rite: Roman Rite
- Established: Diocese: 29 September 1850; 176 years ago; Archdiocese: 28 October 1911; 114 years ago
- Cathedral: Liverpool Metropolitan Cathedral of Christ the King
- Co-cathedral: Co-cathedral of St Mary of the Isle
- Secular priests: 215 (total); 150 (diocesan); 65 (religious orders)

Current leadership
- Pope: Leo XIV
- Metropolitan Archbishop: John Francis Sherrington
- Auxiliary Bishops: Thomas Neylon
- Vicar General: Canon Aidan Prescott
- Bishops emeritus: Patrick Kelly; Thomas Williams; Malcolm McMahon

Map
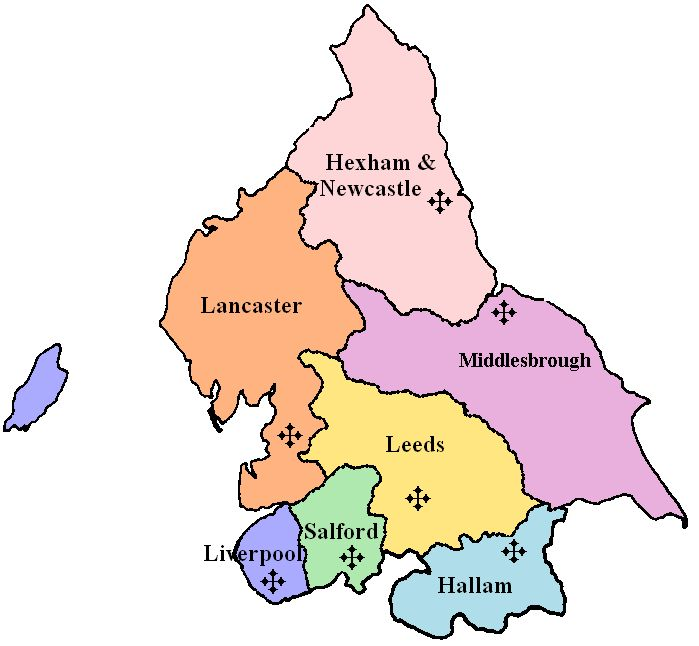
- The Archdiocese of Liverpool shown within the Province of Liverpool, also known as the Northern Province

Website
- www.liverpoolcatholic.org.uk

The Metropolitan Archdiocese of Liverpool (Latin: Archidioecesis Metropolitae Liverpolitana) is a Latin Church archdiocese of the Catholic Church that covers the Isle of Man and part of North West England. The episcopal see is Liverpool Metropolitan Cathedral. The archdiocese is the centre of the Ecclesiastical Province of Liverpool which covers the north of England as well as the Isle of Man.

== History ==
With the gradual abolition of the legal restrictions on the activities of Catholics in England and Wales in the early 19th century, Rome decided to proceed to bridge the gap of the centuries from Queen Elizabeth I by instituting Catholic dioceses on the regular historical pattern. Thus Pope Pius IX issued the bull Universalis Ecclesiae of 29 September 1850 by which thirteen new dioceses which did not formally claim any continuity with the pre-Elizabethan English dioceses were created.

One of these was the diocese of Liverpool. Initially it comprised the Hundreds of West Derby, Leyland, Fylde, Amounderness and Lonsdale in Lancashire and the Isle of Man.

In the early period from 1850 the diocese was a suffragan of the Metropolitan See of Westminster, but a further development was the creation under Pope Pius X on 28 October 1911, of a new Province of Liverpool (also known as the Northern Province).

== Location ==
The archdiocese covers an area of 1,165 km^{2} (450 sq. mi.) of the west of the County of Lancashire south of the Ribble (West Lancashire and part of South Ribble), parts of Merseyside, Cheshire, Greater Manchester, the historic Hundreds of West Derby and Leyland and the Isle of Man. The see is in the City of Liverpool, where the archbishop's cathedra or seat is located in the Metropolitan Cathedral of Christ the King, which was dedicated on 14 May 1967.

The central office building known as the Liverpool Archdiocesan Centre for Evangelisation (LACE). The address is LACE, Croxteth Drive, Liverpool, L17 1AA. The main telephone number is 0151 522 1000.

== Archdiocesan statistics 2018 ==
Compiled 3 December 2018

Catholic Population 2017: 441,000
Parishes: 157
Priests (Diocesan & Religious): 190
Houses of Religious Brothers: 5
Convents of Religious Sisters: 54
Permanent Deacons: 97

Catholic Schools & Colleges

Primary Schools: 184
High Schools: 27
Academies: 7
Sixth Form Colleges: 2
Extra-Diocesan: 4
Independent: 4

== Archbishop and metropolitan ==
On 21 March 2014 Pope Francis appointed bishop Malcolm McMahon as the ninth archbishop of Liverpool. Bishop McMahon was enthroned as Archbishop of Liverpool on 1 May 2014.

Bishop Thomas Anthony Williams was previously appointed Apostolic Administrator during the sede vacante, until the appointment of a new archbishop, following the resignation of Archbishop Patrick Kelly, with effect from 28 February 2013.

== Cathedrals ==
The Liverpool Metropolitan Cathedral of Christ the King (usually shortened to Liverpool Metropolitan Cathedral) is a Catholic cathedral in Liverpool, England. It replaced the Pro-Cathedral of St. Nicholas, Copperas Hill. The cathedral is the seat of the archbishop of Liverpool, the mother church of Liverpool's Catholics, and the metropolitan church of the Catholic Church's northern province in England.

In 1853 Bishop Goss awarded the commission for the building of a new Catholic cathedral to Edward Welby Pugin (1833–1875), the son of Augustus Welby Pugin, the joint architect of the Houses of Parliament and champion of the Gothic Revival. By 1856 the Lady Chapel of the new cathedral had been completed on a site adjacent to the Catholic Institute on Saint Domingo Road, Everton. Due to financial restrictions work on the building ceased at this point and the Lady Chapel now named Our Lady Immaculate served as parish church to the local Catholic population until its demolition in the 1980s.

Following purchase of the present 9-acre (36,000 m^{2}) site at Brownlow Hill in 1930 Sir Edwin Lutyens (1869–1944) was commissioned to provide a design which would be an appropriate response to the Gilbert Scott-designed Neo-gothic Anglican cathedral then emerging at the other end of Hope Street. Lutyens' design would have created a massive classical/Byzantine structure that would have become the second-largest church in the world. It would have had the world's largest dome. The foundation stone for the new building was laid on 5 June 1933, but again financial restrictions caused the abandonment of this plan after construction of the crypt.

The new cathedral, designed by Sir Frederick Gibberd and consecrated in 1967, was built above the crypt. Its circular plan was conceived in direct response to the Second Vatican Council's requirements for a greater and more intimate integration of the congregation with the clergy.

"Mother Church earnestly desires that all the faithful should be led to that fully conscious, and active participation in liturgical celebrations " Second Vatican Council 1962–1965

Chapels are built in between the buttresses that support the tent-shaped spire (which represents the crown of thorns of Jesus) like tent poles. A short film, Crown of Glass, documents the construction of the cathedral's rainbow-coloured stained glass windows.

The cathedral stands on the site of the Liverpool Workhouse, on Hope Street. Facing it at the opposite end of Hope Street is the Cathedral Church of Christ, Liverpool's Anglican cathedral. Ironically, Lutyens was an Anglican, while the architect of the Anglican cathedral, Sir Giles Gilbert Scott, was Catholic.

== Ministries ==
=== Youth service ===
Animate Youth Ministries is the youth service for the Archdiocese of Liverpool. The team, based at Lowe House, St Helens, is led by Simon Gore, and consists of a leadership team and a volunteer team all living in community together at Lowe House. Animate Youth Ministries works with school and parish groups on day retreats, mission days and mission weeks, and also holds youth Masses which take place at St Mary's Church, Lowe House, St. Helens. The Liverpool Archdiocesan Youth form an integral part of the annual Liverpool Archdiocesan Lourdes Pilgrimage. As of 2014, the team works with over 9,000 young people each year.

=== Missionary project ===
The Archdiocese of Liverpool has a long tradition of sending priests to work on the missions in Latin America, in particular Peru, This is known as the Liverpool Archdiocesan Missionary Project or colloquially as LAMP. In 2014, there were two priests involved in ministering to disadvantaged communities in Latin America, namely Simon Cadwallader and Dennis Parry.

== Annual Lourdes pilgrimage ==
In 1923, the first official archdiocesan pilgrimage set off from Liverpool for Lourdes and continues to the present day, interrupted only by the period of the Second World War. Led by the archbishop or his auxiliary, the week-long pilgrimage normally takes place each year between the end of July and beginning of August. During the week ordinary pilgrims from across the archdiocese meet to participate in services & processions whilst assisted pilgrims are cared for by Liverpool Hospitalité members and helpers from the Archdiocesean Youth Service.

== Bishops ==
=== List of ordinaries ===
Vicar Apostolic of Lancashire District

- 1840–1850: George Hilary Brown; see below

Bishops of Liverpool

- 1850–1856: George Hilary Brown; see above
- 1856–1872: Alexander Goss
- 1873–1894: Bernard O'Reilly
- 1894–1911: Thomas Whiteside; see below

Metropolitan Archbishops of Liverpool

- 1911–1921: Thomas Whiteside; see above
- 1921–1928: Frederick William Keating
- 1928–1953: Richard Downey
- 1953–1956: William Godfrey, appointed Archbishop of Westminster (Cardinal in 1958)
- 1957–1963: John Carmel Heenan, appointed Archbishop of Westminster (Cardinal in 1965)
- 1964–1976: George Andrew Beck AA
- 1976–1996: Derek Worlock
- 1996–2013: Patrick Altham Kelly
- 2014–2025: Malcolm Patrick McMahon OP
- 2025–present: John Sherrington

=== Coadjutor Bishops ===
- James Sharples (1843–1850), as Coadjutor Vicar Apostolic; did not succeed to see; died before the see became a diocese
- Alexander Goss (1853–1856)

=== Auxiliary Bishops ===
- Robert Dobson (1922–1942)
- Joseph Gray (1968–1980), appointed Bishop of Shrewsbury
- Joseph Formby Halsall (1945–1958)
- Augustine Harris (1965–1978), appointed Bishop of Middlesbrough
- Anthony Hitchen (1979–1988)
- Vincent Malone (1989–2006)
- Kevin O'Connor (1979–1993)
- John Rawsthorne (1981–1997), appointed Bishop of Hallam
- Thomas Anthony Williams (2003–
- Thomas Neylon (2021–

=== Other priests of this diocese who became bishops ===
- John Patrick Barrett, appointed auxiliary bishop of Birmingham in 1926
- John Bilsborrow, appointed Bishop of Salford in 1892
- Paul Richard Gallagher, appointed nuncio and titular archbishop in 2004
- Vincent Gerard Nichols, appointed auxiliary bishop of Westminster in 1991; future Cardinal
- Thomas Edward Flynn, appointed Bishop of Lancaster in 1939
- William Godfrey, appointed apostolic delegate and titular archbishop in 1938; later returned here as archbishop; future cardinal
- Thomas Holland, appointed Coadjutor Bishop of Portsmouth in 1960
- Richard Preston, appointed auxiliary bishop of Hexham and Newcastle in 1900

=== William Godfrey ===
William Godfrey (25 September 1889 - 22 January 1963) was a Catholic bishop, his highest posting was as Archbishop of Westminster. Born in Liverpool, he was educated at Ushaw College and at the Venerable English College, where he was ordained in 1916, during the First World War. He gained his Doctorate the following year. He then taught at Ushaw for 12 years: Classics, Philosophy and Theology. In 1930 he was appointed Rector of the College where during the next eight years he watched Benito Mussolini's rise to power. He was known affectionately to his students despite his strictness as "Uncle Bill." In 1938 he became the first Apostolic Delegate to Great Britain, Gibraltar and Malta and he served in this post with such discretion that in 1953, long after the war, he became Archbishop of Liverpool and in 1956 he was appointed as Archbishop of Westminster. He was created Cardinal two years later. He died in London on 22 January 1963, aged 73.

=== Vincent Nichols ===
Vincent Gerard Nichols was born in Crosby, Liverpool on 8 November 1945. He entered the Venerable English College (Rome) in 1963 and was ordained priest on 21 December 1969. His further studies include obtaining the Licentiate in Sacred Theology from the Pontifical Gregorian University and the degree of Master of Arts from the University of Manchester, specialising in the theology of John Fisher. After working in the Archdiocese of Liverpool for 14 years, including, latterly, as the Director of the Upholland Northern Institute, Vincent Nichols was appointed General Secretary of the Catholic Episcopal Conference of England & Wales for nine years. In 1992 he was appointed by Pope John Paul II as titular bishop of Abora. He served as an auxiliary bishop in the Archdiocese of Westminster between 1992 and 2000, having special pastoral oversight for North London. During this time he served under Basil Hume, Cardinal Archbishop of Westminster. He presided over the burial of Cardinal Hume, at the end of his Requiem Mass in 1999. Nichols was appointed the eleventh Archbishop of Westminster by Pope Benedict XVI on 3 April 2009. The archdiocese, the primatial see of the Church in England and Wales, serves 472,600 Catholics. On 22 February 2014, Pope Francis admitted Nichols to the Sacred College of Cardinals at a general consistory.

=== John Rawsthorne ===
John Rawsthorne (born 12 November 1936) is the previous ordinary of the Diocese of Hallam in the Province of Liverpool. He had previously been a priest and later auxiliary bishop of the Archdiocese of Liverpool and the titular bishop of Rotdon. Bishop Rawsthorne succeeded Bishop Gerald Moverley, the 1st Bishop of Hallam when Bishop Moverley resigned in July 1996. Rawsthorne was selected as the 2nd Bishop of Hallam on 4 June 1997 and was installed on 3 July 1997. The bishop is a keen walker and takes part in a sponsored walk every year to raise money to support St. Wilfrid's Drop-in Day Centre in Sheffield. His retirement took place on 20 May 2014, when it was announced by the Vatican that Pope Francis had appointed Ralph Heskett, Bishop of Gibraltar to succeed Rawsthorne as Bishop of Hallam.

=== Paul Gallagher ===
Paul Richard Gallagher, Secretary for Relations with States, was born in Liverpool and educated at St. Francis Xavier's College in Woolton. Ordained by Archbishop Derek Worlock in 1977, he served in Fazakerley before becoming a member of the Holy See's diplomatic service. Since 1984 he has held posts in Tanzania, Uruguay, the Philippines, the Vatican Secretariat of State in Rome and with the Council of Europe in Strasbourg. From January 2004 to February 2009 he was Apostolic Nuncio to Burundi, then from February 2009 until December 2012 he was Apostolic Nuncio to Guatemala when he was appointed as Apostolic Nuncio to Australia a post he held until being made Secretary for Relations with States on 8 November 2014 by Pope Francis.

=== Vincent Malone ===
Vincent Malone was born in Liverpool on 11 September 1931. He was ordained to the priesthood for the Liverpool archdiocese at St Oswald's, Old Swan, Liverpool on 18 September 1955. He was ordained titular bishop of Abora and auxiliary bishop of the Archdiocese of Liverpool by Archbishop Derek Worlock on 3 July 1989. It was officially announced on 26 October 2006 that Bishop Vincent Malone would be retiring as auxiliary bishop of Liverpool. In common with all Bishops he was required to submit his letter of retirement to Pope Benedict XVI on reaching the age of 75. He continued to be a vicar general, a member of the archbishop's council and a trustee of the archdiocese. Moreover, although he no longer carried out formal parish visitations, Malone continued to celebrate the Sacrament of Confirmation. Bishop Vincent Malone died on 18 May 2020, aged 88, at the Royal Liverpool Hospital, after testing positive for COVID-19.

=== Augustine Harris ===
Augustine Harris was born in Liverpool and ordained a priest at Upholland College on 30 May 1942 for the Archdiocese of Liverpool. He was ordained titular bishop of Socia and auxiliary bishop of the Archdiocese of Liverpool by Archbishop George Andrew Beck on 11 February 1966. He translated to the Diocese of Middlesbrough on 20 November 1978 and retired on 3 November 1992. In retirement he lived in Formby and latterly at Ince Blundell Hall, where he died, aged 79.

== See also ==
- List of Catholic churches in the United Kingdom
