= Liverpool Metropolitan Cathedral =

Catholic cathedral in Liverpool, England

Coordinates: 53°24′17″N 2°58′08″W

- Metropolitan Cathedral of Christ the King
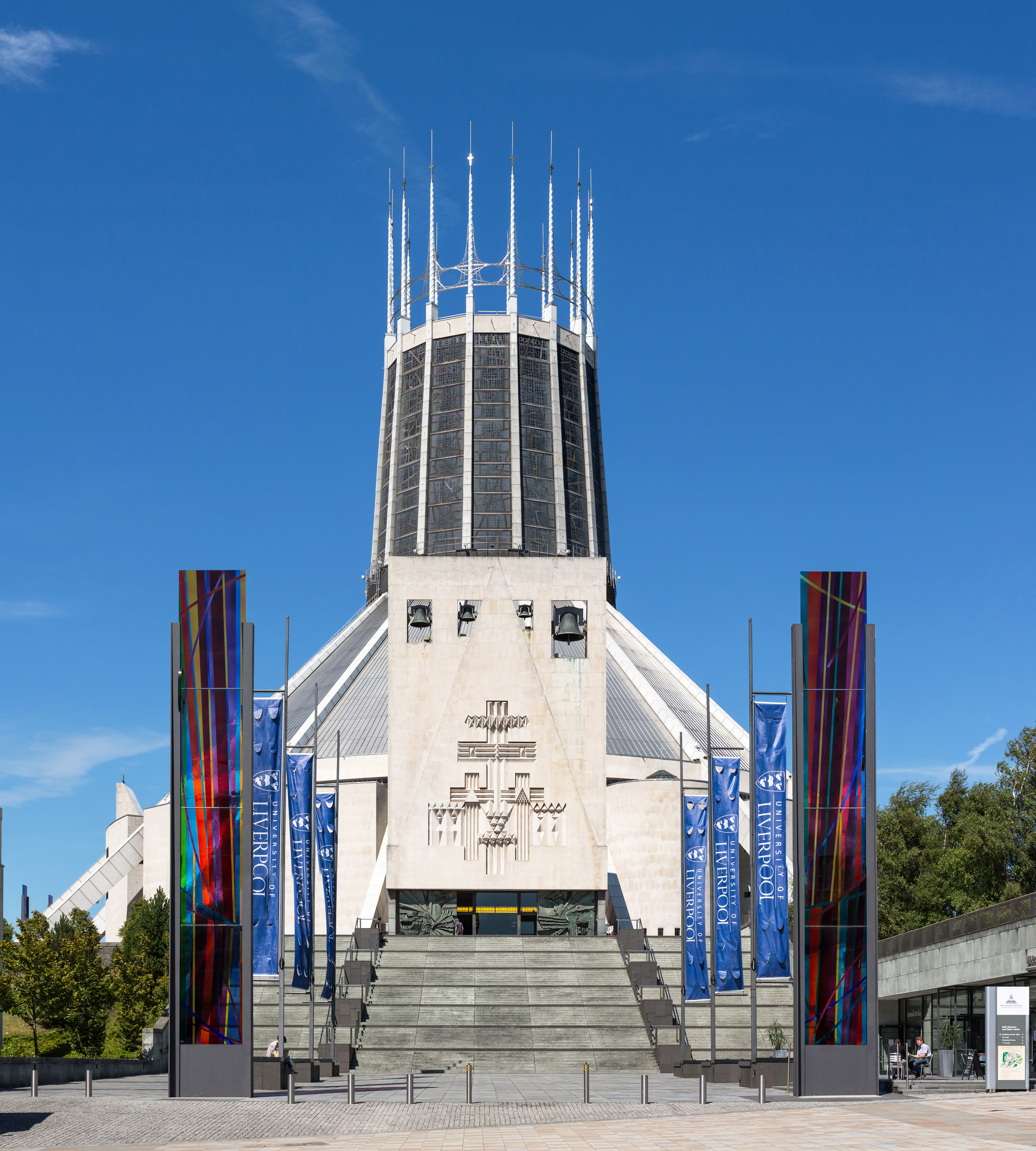
- Liverpool Metropolitan Cathedral, Mount Pleasant

- Shown within Liverpool
- Location: Liverpool, England
- Denomination: Catholic Church
- Sui iuris church: Latin Church
- Tradition: Roman Rite
- Website: liverpoolmetrocathedral.org.uk

History
- Status: Cathedral
- Dedication: Jesus Christ
- Consecrated: 1967

Architecture
- Architect(s): Sir Edwin Lutyens; Sir Frederick Gibberd
- Architectural type: Modern
- Groundbreaking: 1962
- Completed: 1967

Specifications
- Width: 59 metres (194 ft)
- Height: 84.86 metres (278.4 ft)

Administration
- Province: Liverpool
- Archdiocese: Liverpool

Clergy
- Bishops: Most Rev John Sherrington; Right Rev Thomas Neylon
- Dean: Canon Anthony O'Brien

Listed Building – Grade I
- Designated: 14 March 1975; Amended 6 June 2025
- Reference no.: 1070607

Liverpool Metropolitan Cathedral, officially known as the Metropolitan Cathedral of Christ the King is the seat of the Archbishop of Liverpool and the mother church of the Archdiocese of Liverpool in Liverpool, England. The Grade I Metropolitan Cathedral is one of Liverpool's many listed buildings.

The cathedral's architect, Frederick Gibberd, was the winner of a worldwide design competition. Construction began in 1962 and was completed in 1967. Earlier designs for a cathedral were proposed in 1933 and 1953, but neither was completed. It is sometimes referred to colloquially as "Paddy's Wigwam".

== History ==
Prior to the English Reformation Liverpool was a small riverside town, and lay in the diocese of Lichfield. In the 18th and 19th centuries, and especially during the Great Irish Famine (1845–1852) the Catholic population of Liverpool increased dramatically. About half a million Irish, who were predominantly Catholic, fled to England to escape the famine; many embarked from Liverpool to travel to North America while others remained in the city. In 1850, when the Catholic hierarchy in England and Wales was re-established and because of the increase in the Catholic population, Liverpool was chosen as the seat of one of the 13 new dioceses thus formed. The co-adjutor Bishop of Liverpool, Alexander Goss (1814–1872), saw the need for a cathedral, and chose as its location the grounds of St. Edward's College on St. Domingo Road, Everton.

=== Pugin's design ===
External image
- Pugin’s design for Liverpool’s Catholic cathedral

In 1853 Goss, then bishop, awarded the commission for the building of the new cathedral to Edward Welby Pugin (1833–1875). By 1856, the Lady chapel of the new cathedral had been completed. Due to financial resources being diverted to the education of Catholic children, work on the building ceased at this point and the Lady chapel – now named Our Lady Immaculate – served as parish church to the local Catholic population until its demolition in the 1980s.

=== Lutyens' design ===
Illustration by Cyril Farey of Edwin Lutyens' unrealised design for the cathedral

Following the purchase of the 9-acre (3.6 ha) former Brownlow Hill workhouse site in 1930, Sir Edwin Lutyens (1869–1944) was commissioned to provide a design that would be an appropriate response to the Giles Gilbert Scott-designed Neo-gothic Anglican cathedral, then partially complete further along Hope Street.

Lutyens' design was intended to create a massive structure that would have become the second-largest church in the world. It would have had the world's largest dome, with a diameter of 168 feet (51 m) compared to the 137.7 feet (42.0 m) diameter on St. Peter's Basilica in Vatican City. Building work based on Lutyens' design began on Whit Monday, 5 June 1933, funded mostly by the contributions of working class Catholics of the burgeoning industrial port. In 1941, the restrictions of World War II wartime and a rising cost from £3 million to £27 million (£1.18 billion in 2025), forced construction to stop. In 1956, work recommenced on the crypt, which was finished in 1958. Thereafter, Lutyens' design for the cathedral was considered too costly and was abandoned with only the crypt complete. The restored architectural model of the Lutyens cathedral is on display at the Museum of Liverpool.

=== Scott's reduced design ===
After the ambitious design by Lutyens fell through, Adrian Gilbert Scott, brother of Sir Giles Gilbert Scott (architect of the Anglican Cathedral), was commissioned in 1953 to work on a smaller cathedral design with a £4 million budget (£97 million in 2025). He proposed a scaled-down version of Lutyens' building, retaining the massive dome. Scott's plans were criticised and the building did not go ahead.

=== Gibberd's design ===
The present Cathedral was designed by Sir Frederick Gibberd (1908–1984). Construction began in October 1962 and less than five years later, on the Feast of Pentecost 14 May 1967, the completed cathedral was consecrated. Soon after its opening, it began to exhibit architectural flaws. This led the cathedral authorities to sue Frederick Gibberd for £1.3 million on five counts, the two most serious being leaks in the aluminium roof covering and defects in the mosaic tiles, which had begun to come away from the concrete ribs. The design has been described by Stephen Bayley as "a thin and brittle take on an Oscar Niemeyer original in Brasilia," though Nikolaus Pevsner notes that the resemblance is only superficial. A grade II* listing was given to the Lutyens crypt in 1975, which was amended to include the entire cathedral in 1994. The listing was upgraded to grade I in 2025.

== Architecture ==
=== Concept ===
The competition to design the cathedral was held in 1959. The requirement was first, seating for a congregation of 3,000 (later reduced to 2,000) all with direct line of sight to the altar, so they could be more involved in the celebration of the Mass; and, second, for the existing Lutyens crypt to be incorporated in the structure. Gibberd achieved these requirements by designing a circular building with the altar at its centre, and by transforming the roof of the crypt into an elevated platform, with the cathedral standing at one end. The construction contract was let to Taylor Woodrow.

=== Exterior ===
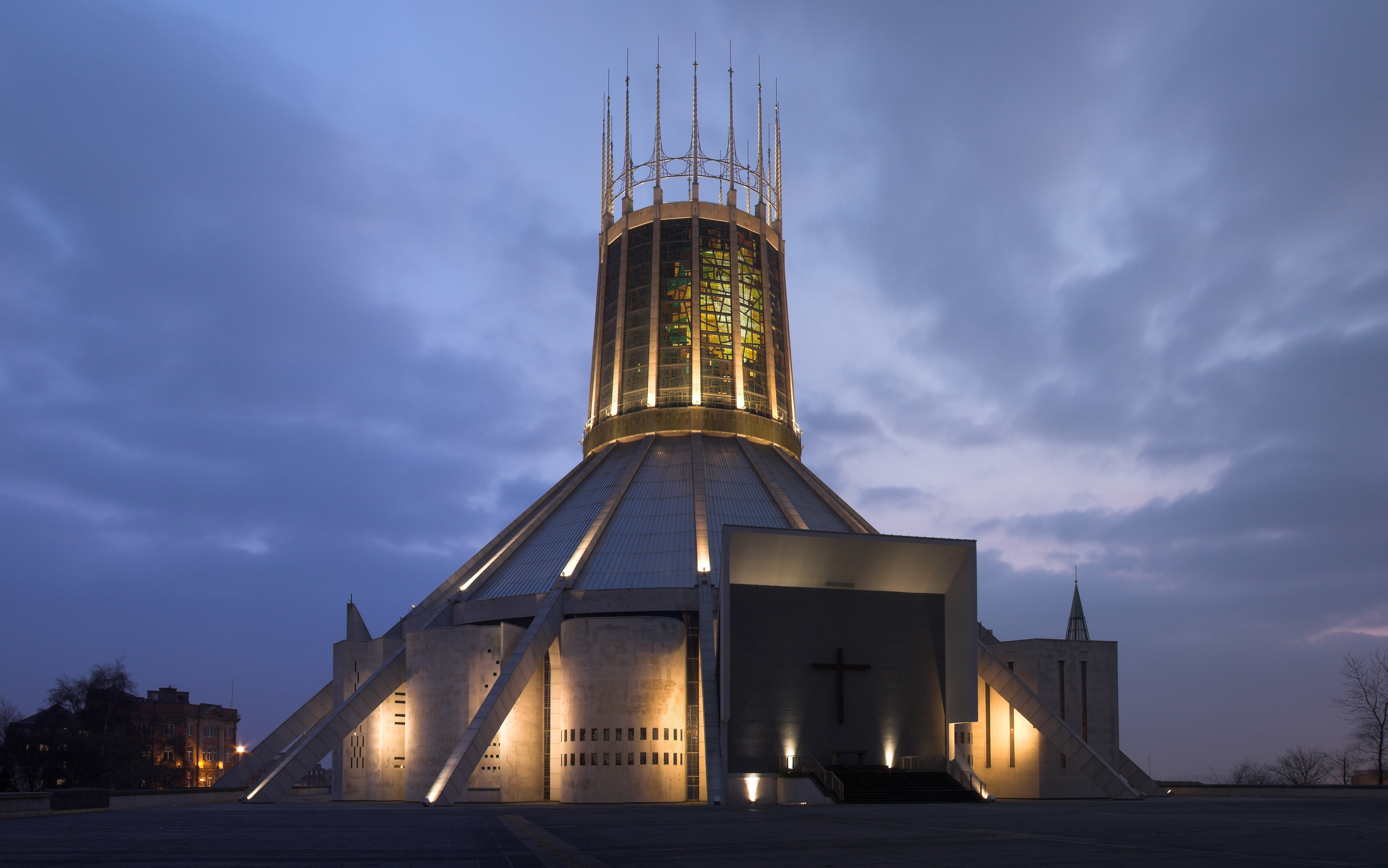
The cathedral at dusk

The cathedral is built in concrete with a Portland stone cladding and an aluminium covering to the roof. Its plan is circular, having a diameter of 195 feet (59 m), with 13 chapels around its perimeter. The shape of the cathedral is conical, and it is surmounted by a tower in the shape of a truncated cone. The building is supported by 16 boomerang-shaped concrete trusses which are held together by two ring beams, one at the bends of the trusses and the other at their tops. Flying buttresses are attached to the trusses, giving the cathedral its tent-like appearance. Rising from the upper ring beam is a lantern tower, containing windows of stained glass, and at its peak is a crown of pinnacles.

The entrance is at the top of a wide flight of steps leading up from Hope Street. Above the entrance is a large wedge-shaped structure. This acts as a bell tower, the four bells being mounted in rectangular orifices towards the top of the tower. Below these is a geometric relief sculpture, designed by William Mitchell, which includes three crosses. To the sides of the entrance doors are more reliefs in fibreglass by Mitchell, which represent the symbols of the Evangelists. The steps which lead up to the cathedral were only completed in 2003, when a building which obstructed the stairway path was acquired and demolished by developers.

A much smaller version of the cathedral, also designed by Sir Frederick Gibberd, was constructed in 1965 as a chapel for the former De La Salle College of Education, Middleton, Lancashire, a Catholic teacher-training college. The site is now occupied by Hopwood Hall College, a further education college of the Borough of Rochdale and the chapel may still be seen.

=== Interior ===
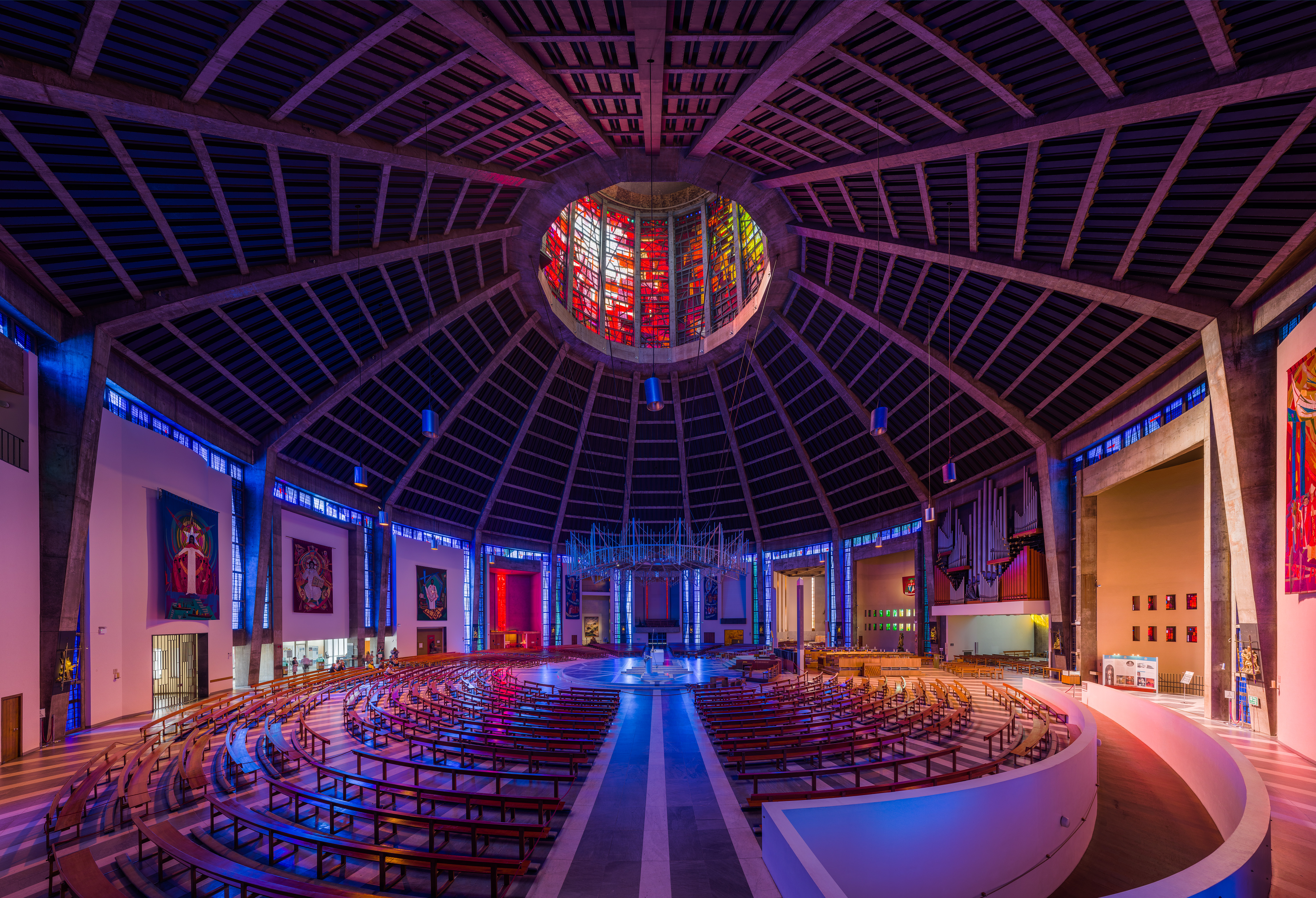
The nave and sanctuary of the cathedral

The focus of the interior is the altar which faces the main entrance. It is made of white marble from Skopje, North Macedonia, and is 10 feet (3 m) long. The floor is also of marble in grey and white designed by David Atkins. The benches, concentric with the interior, were designed by Frank Knight. Around the perimeter is a series of chapels. Some of the chapels are open, some are closed by almost blank walls, and others consists of a low space under a balcony. Opposite the entrance is the Blessed Sacrament Chapel, above which is the organ. Other chapels include the Lady Chapel and the Chapel of Saint Joseph. To the right of the entrance is the Baptistry.

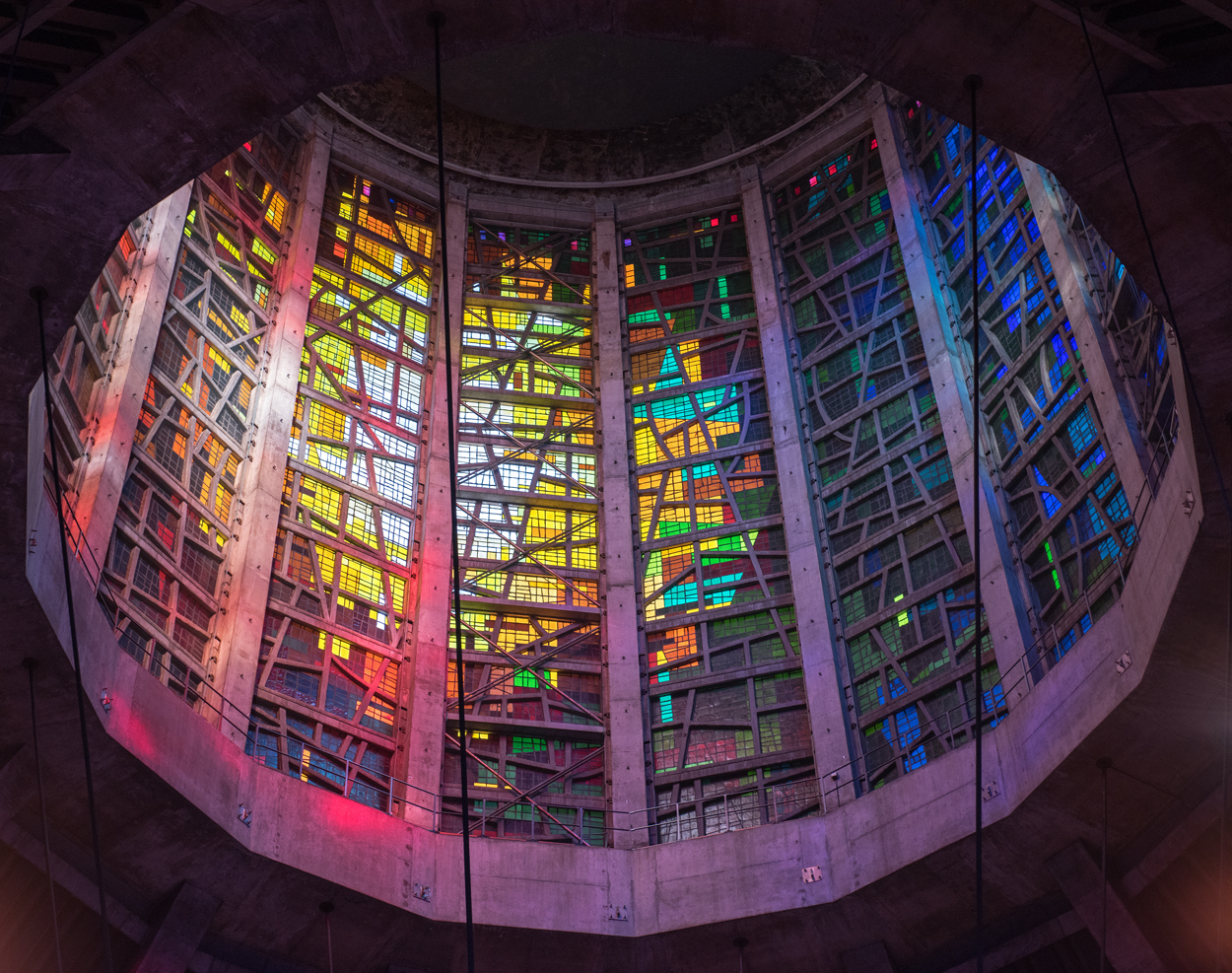
Crown of Glass by John Piper

Rising centrally over the main altar is a 16-sided lantern known as the Crown of Glass. Architecturally integral to the building, it is approximately 22.5 metres high and 21 metres in diameter at its base, tapering inward by a few degrees as it rises. Each of the 16 bays are individually glazed with between nine and twelve panels of stained glass that were designed and manufactured by John Piper and Patrick Reyntiens between 1965 and 1967. Piper and Reyntiens used a dalle de verre technique in which the individual glass components was cemented together with epoxy resin within thin concrete ribs, a technique that they invented for the job with the assistance of David Kirby. With a glazed area of approximately 1,120 square metres it is the largest single commission undertaken by Piper and Reyntiens. The abstract design was inspired by a description from Dante's Paradiso of the Holy Trinity as "three great eyes of different colours each one winking at the other", a theme conveyed in shards of blue, green, red and yellow glass.

On the altar, the candlesticks are by R. Y. Goodden and the bronze crucifix is by Elisabeth Frink. Above the altar is a baldachino designed by Gibberd as a crown-like structure composed of aluminium rods, which incorporates loudspeakers and lights. Around the interior are metal Stations of the Cross, designed by Sean Rice. Rice also designed the lectern, which includes two entwined eagles. In the Chapel of Reconciliation (formerly the Chapel of Saint Paul of the Cross), the stained glass was designed by Margaret Traherne. Stephen Foster designed, carved and painted the panelling in the Chapel of St. Joseph. The Lady Chapel contains a statue of the Virgin and Child by Robert Brumby and stained glass by Margaret Traherne. In the Blessed Sacrament Chapel is a reredos and stained glass by Ceri Richards and a small statue of the Risen Christ by Arthur Dooley. In the Chapel of Unity (formerly the Chapel of Saint Thomas Aquinas) is a bronze stoup by Virginio Ciminaghi, and a mosaic of the Pentecost by Hungarian artist Georg Mayer-Marton which was moved from the Church of the Holy Ghost, Netherton, when it was demolished in 1989. The gates of the Baptistry were designed by David Atkins.

=== Architectural problems ===
The cathedral was built quickly and economically, and this led to problems with the fabric of the building, including leaks. A programme of repairs was carried out during the 1990s. The building had been faced with mosaic tiles, but these were impossible to repair and were replaced with glass-reinforced plastic, which gave it a thicker appearance. The aluminium in the lantern was replaced by stainless steel, and the slate paving of the platform was replaced with concrete flags.

== Cathedral crypt ==
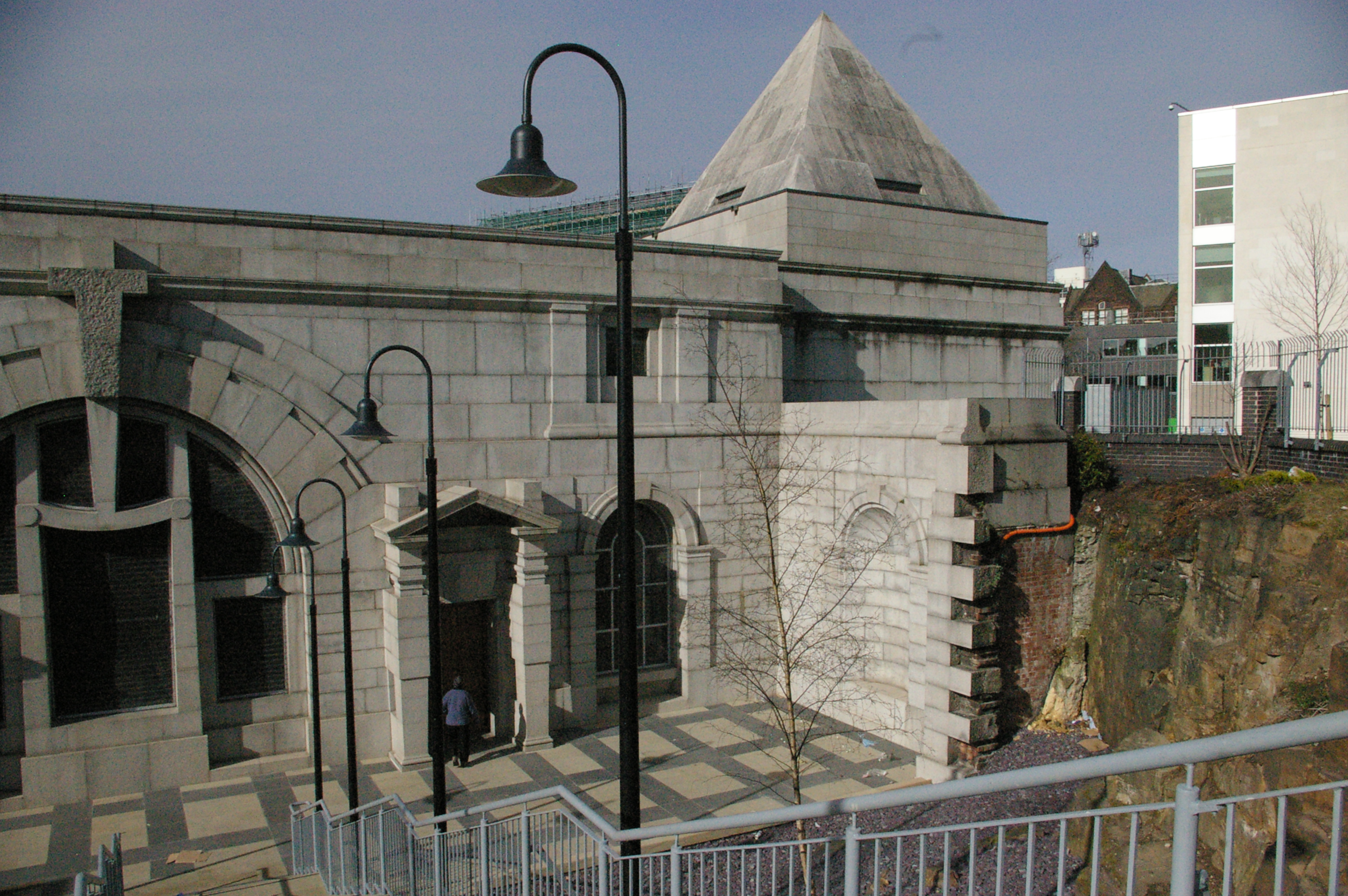
Exterior of the crypt, seen from Brownlow Hill

The crypt under Liverpool Metropolitan Cathedral is the only part that was built according to Lutyens' design before construction was interrupted by World War II; in 1962, Frederick Gibberd's design was built upon the Lutyens crypt. Structurally, the crypt is built of brick together with granite from quarries in Penryn, Cornwall. Each year the crypt is used as the venue for the Liverpool Beer Festival, which attracts visitors from all over the UK as well as Europe and places such as the United States and Australia. The crypt also hosts examinations for students at the University of Liverpool during exam periods.

=== Refurbishment ===
A £3 million refurbishment of the crypt was completed in 2009, and it was officially re-opened on 1 May 2009 by The Duke of Gloucester. The refurbishment included new east and west approaches, archive provision, rewiring and new lighting, catering facilities, a new chancel, new toilets and revamped exhibitions.

=== Notable interments ===
Within the crypt are buried:

- Thomas Whiteside (died 1921), Bishop of Liverpool from 1894, Archbishop from 1911 (reburial)
- George Beck (died 1978), Archbishop 1964–1976
- Derek Worlock (died 1996), Archbishop from 1976

== Organ ==
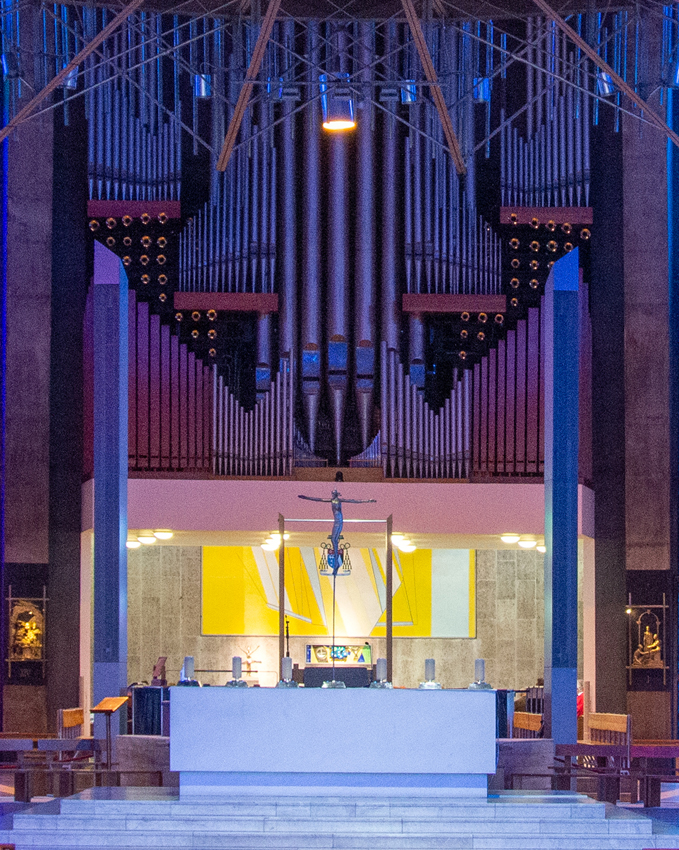
Cathedral organ by J. W. Walker & Sons Ltd

Built by J. W. Walker and Sons, the organ was completed only two days before the opening of the cathedral in 1967. Made as an integral part of the new cathedral, the architect, Frederick Gibberd, saw the casework as part of his brief and so designed the striking front to the organ. Using decorative woodwork, Gibberd was inspired by the innovative use of the pipes at Coventry Cathedral and the Royal Festival Hall and so arranged the shiny zinc pipes and brass trumpets en chamade to contrast strikingly with concrete pillars which surround the organ.

=== Specifications ===
The organ has four manuals, 88 speaking stops and 4565 pipes. It works by way of air pressure, controlled by an electric current and operated by the keys of the organ console; this opens and closes valves within the wind chests, allowing the pipes to speak. This type of motion is called electro-pneumatic action.

	Organ stops	Organ pipes
Great Organ	15	1220
Swell organ	16	1159
Positive Organ	14	793
Solo Organ	15	893
Accompanimental Organ	7	0
Pedal organ	21	500

== Gallery ==
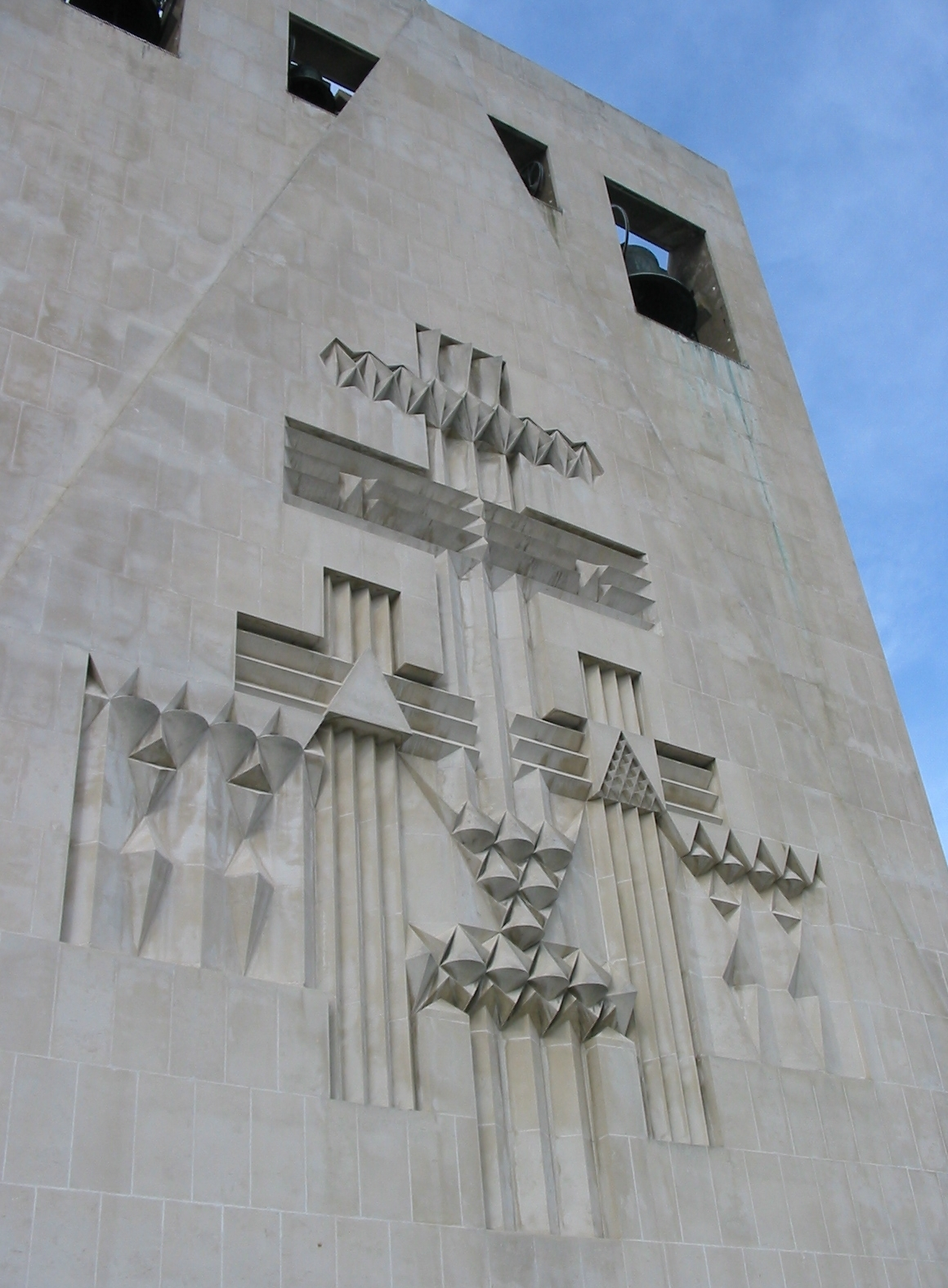
The cathedral's four bells

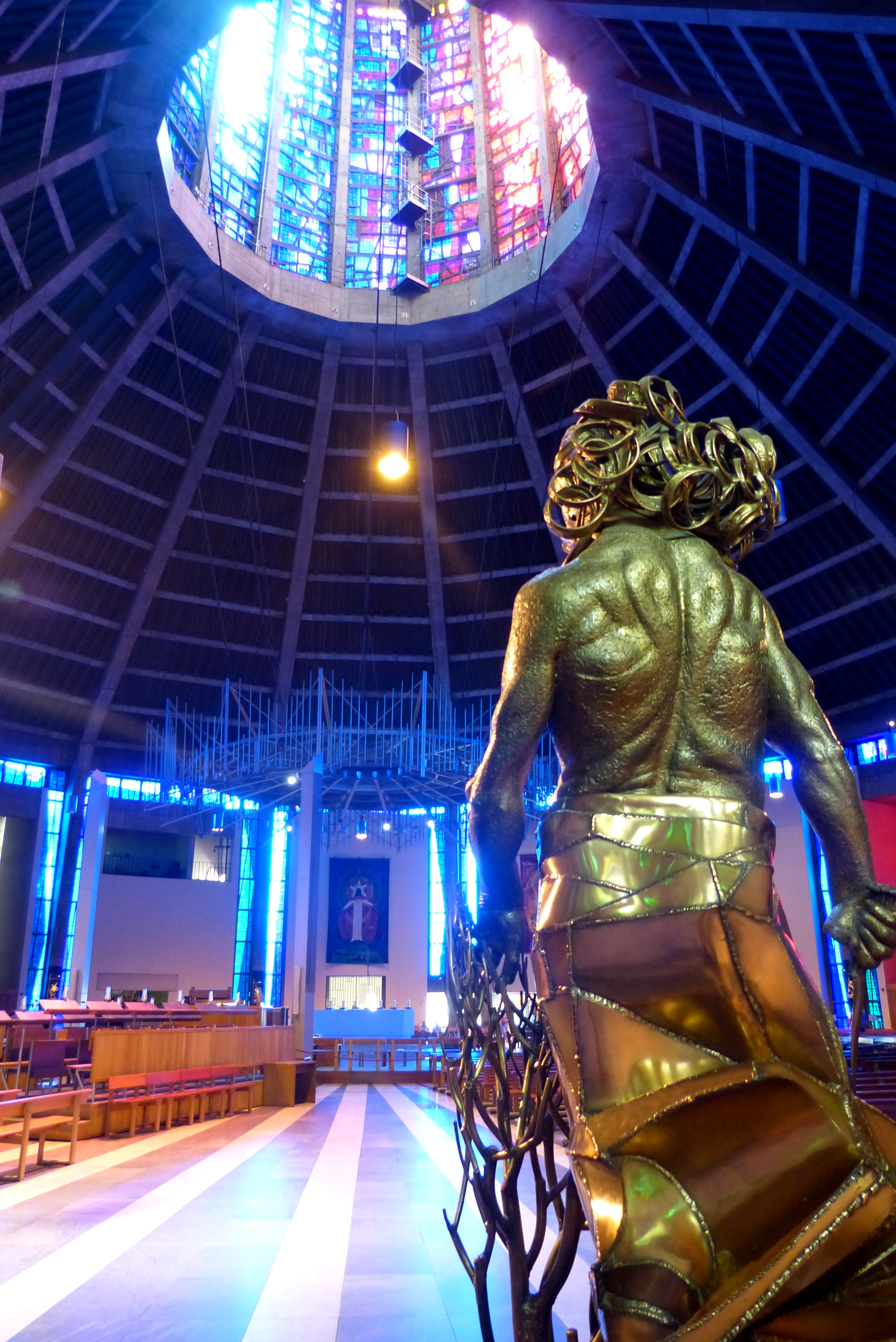
The interior of the cathedral

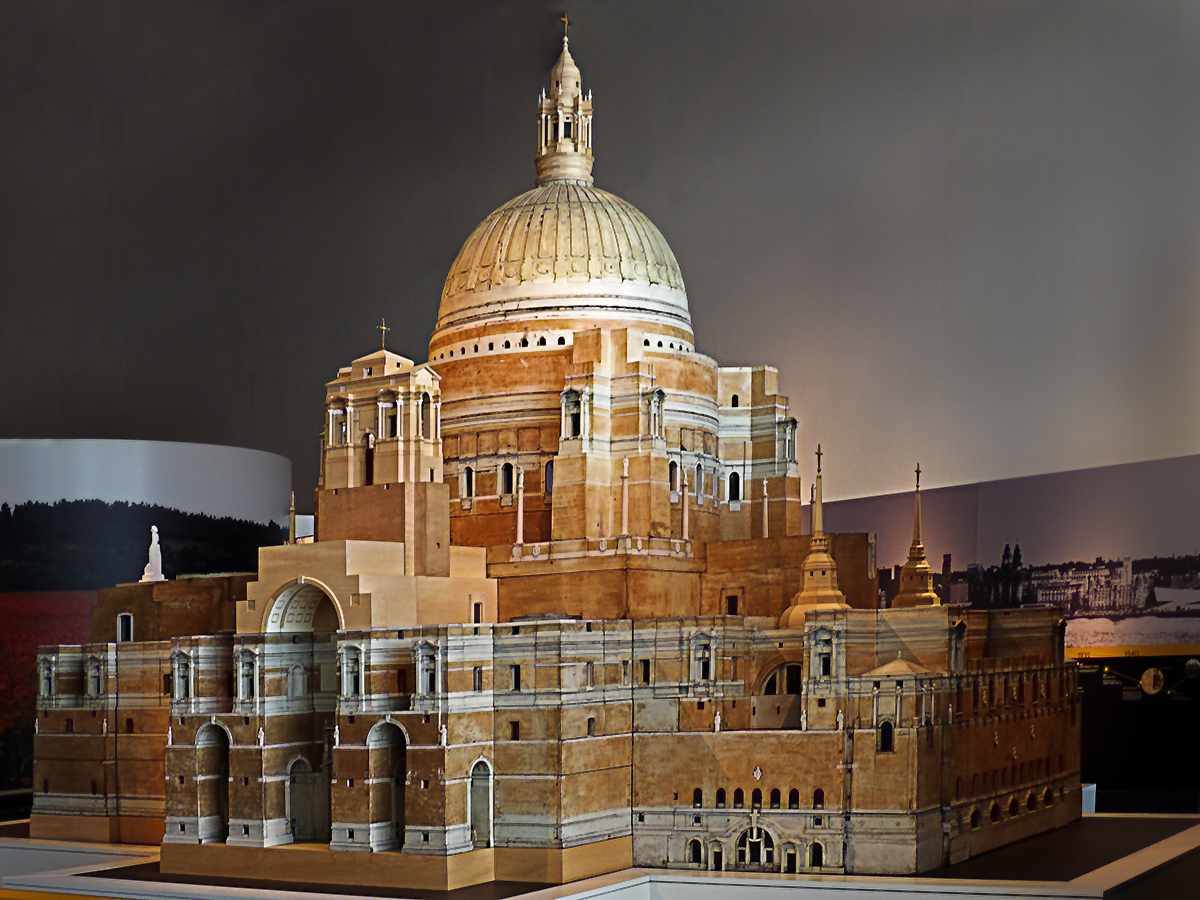
The Great Model of Liverpool Metropolitan Cathedral by Sir Edwin Lutyens presented to the Royal Academy of Arts and at the Museum of Liverpool

== See also ==
- List of cathedrals in the United Kingdom
- Architecture of Liverpool
