= Henry Rutter =

English Roman Catholic priest

Henry Rutter (né Banister; 26 February 1755 – 17 September 1838) was an English Roman Catholic priest. He took part in the controversy over Robert Southey's Book of the Church (1824), in which Charles Butler was the Catholic protagonist.

== Life ==
He was the son of Adam Banister of Hesketh Bank and Agnes, daughter of Richard Butler, of Mawdesley, Lancashire. On 26 September 1768, he went to Douai College, where he found his uncle, Robert Banister. In May 1781, he became professor at St. Omer's College for the secular clergy.

On the English mission, he served several places in the north before his appointment in 1817 to Yealand, Lancashire, where he remained until January 1834. The rest of his life was spent at Dodding Green, Westmorland, where he died at age 83.

== Works ==
- Answer to Dr. Southey, a contribution to the controversy provoked by Southey's book
- Evangelical Harmony, re-edited (1857) by Husenbeth.

Rutter's other works, chiefly scriptural exegeses and devotional translations, are enumerated and described by Joseph Gillow.
