= St Joseph's College, Up Holland =

St Joseph's College
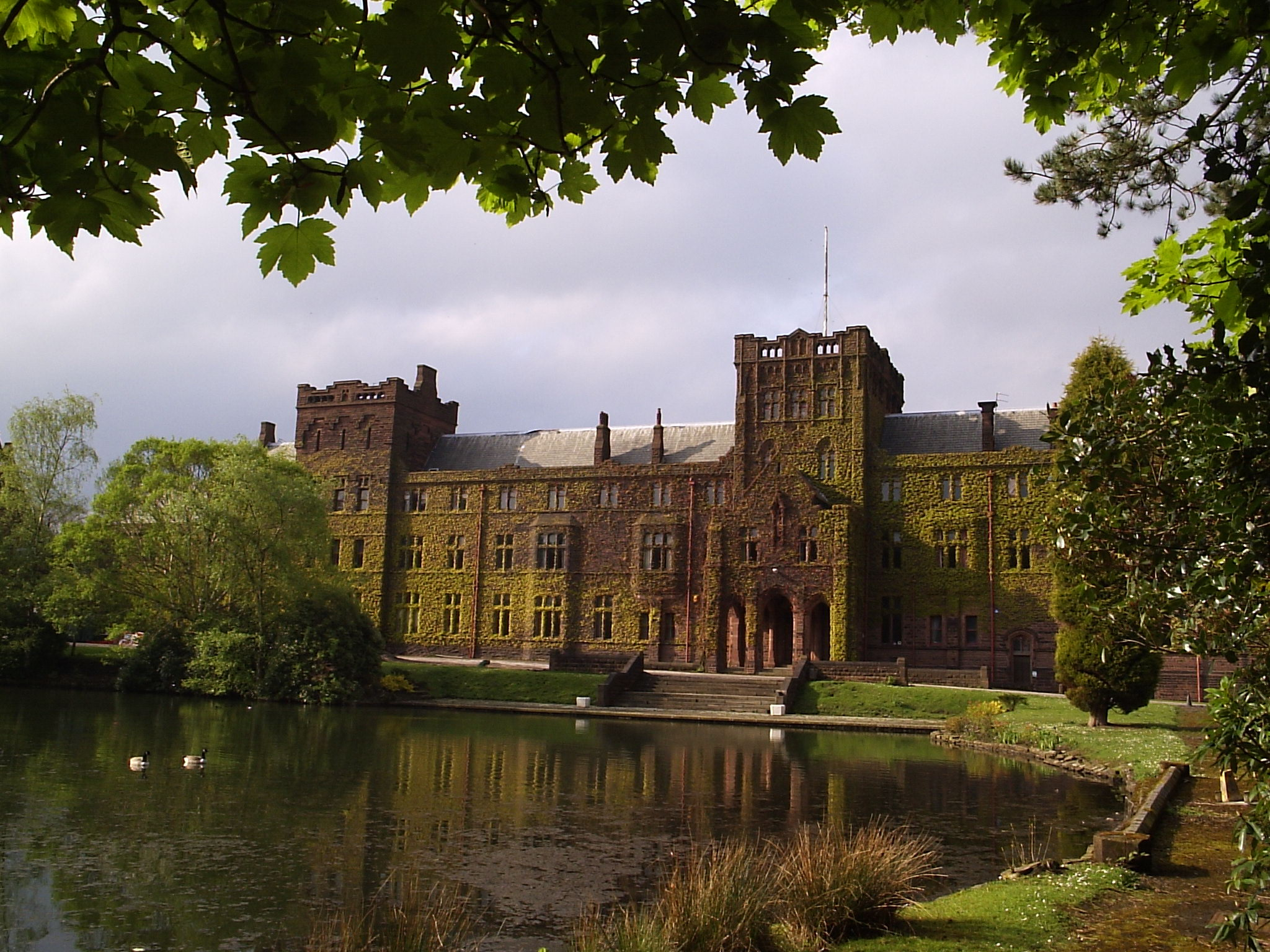
- South wing of the college

Location
- Up Holland, Lancashire, UK
- 53.5534°N 2.7322°W

Information
- Motto: In Te Domine Speravi (Trust in the Lord)
- Religious affiliation: Roman Catholic
- Founded: 1880
- Founder: Bishop Bernard O'Reilly
- Status: Sold 1999 & derelict since.
- Closed: 1992

St Joseph's College is a former Roman Catholic seminary and boarding school in Up Holland, Lancashire, England. The foundation of the original building was laid in April 1880 and the college opened in 1883. The buildings have since been deconsecrated.

== History ==
St Joseph's College was founded in 1880 by Bishop Bernard O'Reilly to be the Seminary serving the North West of England. On St. Joseph’s Day, 19 March 1880 Dr. O’Reilly blessed and laid the foundation stone of the new college.

The Liverpool Mercury dated 19 April 1880 gives an account of this event:

In the presence of several thousand persons from all parts of Lancashire, the Right Rev. Dr. O’Reilly, Roman Catholic Bishop of Liverpool, blessed and laid, yesterday, the foundation stone of St. Joseph’s Seminary, an institution designed for the education of priests for the diocese under his pastoral care. This is a project which Dr. O’ Reilly has cherished since his accession to the episcopate….. After the stone had been laid the Very Rev. Canon Walker of Lancaster addressed the assemblage…. He earnestly hoped that not a single member of a Catholic family in that great diocese would miss the honour and privilege of contributing to this important work. Above all, let them recommend daily the success of this undertaking in their prayers to God, asking Him to make the seminary the fruitful mother of learned priests and apostolic men.

Construction of a new wing was financed by Gilbert Hayes, "a Citizen of Liverpool, sometime Illustrious Professor of Veterinary Art", who donated £17,000. Progress on the project was described in The Tablet on 11 March 1882:

St. Joseph's Seminary — Diocese of Liverpool.

…of all our Diocesan Seminaries the one laid out upon the largest scale is the new Seminary dedicated to St. Joseph, for the diocese of Liverpool……. It will be in form of a quadrangle when completed, with a quad very nearly an acre in size—considerably larger, therefore, than any of the famous quads in Oxford and Cambridge. At present two sides of the quadrangle have risen up. As you enter the building you find yourself in a corridor 228 feet long, and 13 feet wide: large windows in a simple Gothic style, with seats below them, are on the left, while on the right are class rooms, reception rooms, and approaches to staircases. Out of the north corridor are the temporary chapel, a room of 70 feet, and a room for defensions, as an ante-room to the dining hall, which is also of noble proportions. Attached to the north wing are the offices, which leave nothing whatever to be desired for the convenience and comfort of the servants of a large community; everything that is necessary has been provided. Very extensive and convenient cellarage for coals, stores, and whatever other purpose it may serve, has been procured under the north wing and part of the servants' wing….The south and west sides of the quadrangle have not been undertaken; and there is no present intention of beginning them.

The college is three storeys high, and, in addition to public rooms, it contains forty bed-rooms. The walls are of stone, lined with brick. The stone has been quarried chiefly on the property of the college. The red ashlar stone dressings of the windows are from Runcorn. Though all superfluous ornament has been scrupulously avoided, and a rigorous exclusion has been practised in regard to whatever was not essential, the appearance of the whole building is decidedly pleasing—grave and solid without being heavy, bright and light without being frivolous…….The present contract will be completed and the seminary will be opened in the summer of next year. The grounds are already being laid out. It is reported that the seminary will open with about twenty-five Philosophers and Divines. There are at present over 150 ecclesiastical students belonging to the diocese of Liverpool, scattered through different colleges at home and abroad. The wants of the diocese, we are informed, cannot be met by a smaller supply of priests than ten every year. All this makes it clear how necessary it is that the Bishop should have a seminary of his own, in which he can watch over the education and character of the young men who are destined to become his future clergy.

The college was formally opened in 1883 and was situated in Walthew Park, Up Holland, the geographic centre of the Diocese of Liverpool.

The first Junior Seminary of the Diocese was founded at St Edward's College in 1842 as a Roman Catholic "classical and commercial school" under the direction of the secular clergy and was established in Domingo House, a large house in Everton. Its president for the next forty years was Monsignor Provost John Henry Fisher. When the junior seminarians moved to St Joseph's in 1920, the school was taken over by the Christian Brothers, who also ran St John Rigby College in nearby Orrell, and now serves as the Liverpool Cathedral Choir School. In recognition of the heritage owed to St Edward's College, one of the two chapels at Up Holland was consecrated as the St Edward the Confessor Chapel.

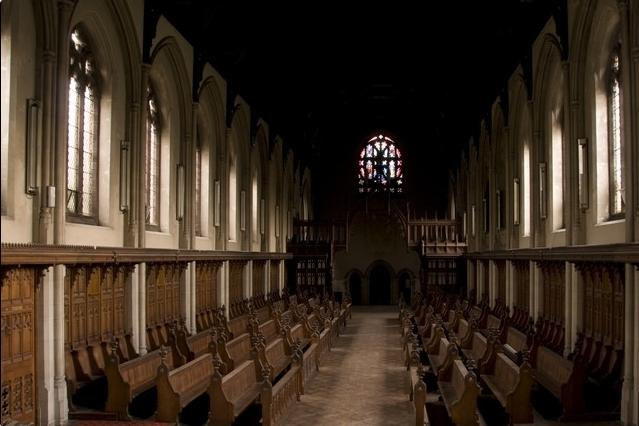
The main Chapel at St Joseph's

St Joseph's, usually referred to by its students simply as "Up Holland", was one of two main seminaries serving the north of England. Up Holland served the northwest and Ushaw College the northeast. For many years, each of these institutions housed both a junior (minor) and a senior (major) seminary. The junior seminaries provided a secondary education in a semi-monastic environment to boys aged 11–18 who wished to pursue the priesthood, while the senior seminaries trained adult candidates, mostly aged between 18 and 24, in philosophy and theology, preparing them for the priesthood. A detailed account of daily life in the junior seminary at Up Holland during the 1960s, Boys of the Cloth, was published in 2012. This also explores the reasons why the Church's traditional form of seminary training may have predisposed some priests to molest children, which was one of the key findings of a major investigation conducted on behalf of American bishops into the causes of the sexual abuse crisis within the Catholic Church in the United States.

Although Up Holland flourished until the 1960s, the rapidly changing social climate in that decade led to a sharp drop in enrolment. In the early 1970s, the northern bishops decided to consolidate the activities of Up Holland and Ushaw; from 1972 all junior seminarians in the north attended Up Holland, and from 1975 all senior seminarians attended Ushaw. Even as the sole junior seminary for the north of England, however, Up Holland continued to suffer a decline in numbers, and by the 1980s it was no longer described as a traditional junior seminary but as a "boarding school for boys considering a vocation".

In 1986, the total number of students was down to 82, of whom only 54 were Church students, and it was no longer considered viable to educate them on the premises. From 1987, the remaining students continued to live at Up Holland but for classes attended St John Rigby College in nearby Orrell, an arrangement that continued until the last of these students left Up Holland in 1992.

In the meantime, following the move of the senior seminary to Ushaw, in 1976 the former Senior Seminary rooms had become the home of the Up Holland Northern Institute (UNI), with Father Kevin Kelly as its first director. He was succeeded in 1980 by Father Vincent Nichols, now Cardinal Archbishop of Westminster. Later, the College buildings were used more generally as a retreat and conference centre for the Archdiocese under the leadership of Monsignor John Devine. A short video tour of the college, derived from footage taken a few months before its closure as a conference centre, highlighting the functions played by different parts of the building during the seminary days, is available online.

The election of Patrick Kelly as Archbishop of Liverpool in 1996 saw the controversial decision to close St Joseph's altogether, and the property was sold for development to Anglo International, who instructed AEW Architects for the conversion of the Grade II listed buildings into 92 apartments, with 220 new build "enabling" units. The major controversies of the decision were the ongoing financial viability of St Joseph's, which had just started to make a small surplus under Devine's management, and the sale and disposal of the art and artefacts in the college, much of which had been donated by various parishes and people of the Archdiocese, who were not offered their donations back.

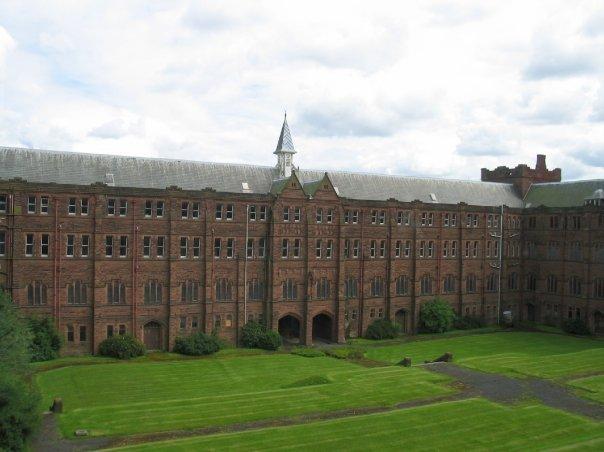
St Joseph's Quadrangle

Since that time, as photographic essays from urban explorers attest, the building has fallen into extensive dereliction, with water ingress and at least one collapsed roof.

== Gradwell Collection ==
This collection, entrusted to Liverpool Hope University on the closure of St. Joseph’s College at Up Holland, contains material covering the following subjects: theology, philosophy, church, secular and local history, ecclesiastical history, art, architecture, sociology, education and works of general reference.

It includes recusant works and early printed works. Donations and subscriptions aside, the book collection has not been added to since 1975, however, the journal and periodical collection, which is mainly theological, has been kept up to date. The collection is particularly strong in Roman Catholic studies, with standard works of reference and extensive runs of Catholic periodicals and journals of use to all levels of research.

== Notable alumni ==
- John Battle (b. 1951), politician; Labour MP for Leeds West
- Alexander Jones (1906–1970), British biblical scholar. He lectured extensively and authored innumerable articles and several books based on the Scriptures. Formerly a senior lecturer in divinity at Christ's College, Liverpool, he followed his time at Up Holland with studies at the Pontifical Gregorian University in Rome and at that city's Biblical Institute, as well as the L'École Biblique in Jerusalem
- Anthony Kenny (b. 1931), Master of Balliol College, Oxford; philosopher, academic
- Michael Kenna (b. 1953), artist, photographer
- Paddy McAloon (b. 1957), singer with Prefab Sprout
- Thomas Neylon (b. 1958), Auxiliary Bishop of Liverpool
- Michael Joseph Pennington (b. 1971), a.k.a. "Johnny Vegas", actor/comedian, television personality
- Bishop John Rawsthorne (b. 1936), Bishop of Hallam
- George Carman QC (1929–2001)
- Alfie Joey, writer, comic, actor, impressionist, singer, presenter, and artist/cartoonist

== Popular culture ==
The building has acted as a film location for the McQueen Church explosion in the Channel 4 soap Hollyoaks. In 2012, Lacey Turner filmed scenes for the TV series Bedlam. In March 2013, a feature film, Noble, based on the life of the charity campaigner Christina Noble, filmed scenes at the college where it doubled as an orphanage.

== See also ==
- Listed buildings in Up Holland
