= List of Catholic dioceses in Great Britain =

The Catholic dioceses in Great Britain are organised by two separate hierarchies: the Catholic Church in England and Wales, and the Catholic Church in Scotland. Within Great Britain, the Catholic Church in England and Wales has five provinces, subdivided into 21 dioceses, and the Catholic Church in Scotland has two provinces, subdivided into 8 dioceses. The Catholic dioceses in Northern Ireland are organised together with those in the Republic of Ireland, as the Catholic Church in Ireland was not divided when civil authority in Ireland was partitioned in 1921.

A diocese, also sometimes known popularly as a bishopric, is an administrative unit under the supervision of a bishop. The Diocese of Westminster is considered the mother church of English and Welsh Catholics, and although not formally a primate, the Archbishop of Westminster is usually elected President of the Catholic Bishops' Conference of England and Wales, providing a degree of a formal direction for the other English bishops and archbishops.

From the time of the English Reformation in the 16th century, with Catholicism being declared illegal, there were no Catholic dioceses in England and Wales. From 1688, there came to be appointed several apostolic vicars, clergymen in episcopal orders, governing a territory not in their own name, as diocesan bishops do, but provisionally in the name of the Pope. However, with the passing of the Roman Catholic Relief Act 1829, legalising the practice of the Catholic faith again, Pope Pius IX re-established the Catholic Church diocesan hierarchy on 29 September 1850 by issuing the bull Universalis Ecclesiae. The Hierarchy in Scotland was restored in 1878.

The names of the Catholic dioceses as re-established did not adopt the names of the then existing medieval dioceses, once Catholic and now (in England) Anglican. Four current English Catholic dioceses, those of Leeds, Liverpool, Southwark and Portsmouth, share their territorial name with Anglican dioceses, the Anglican Diocese of Leeds, the Anglican Diocese of Liverpool, the Anglican Diocese of Southwark and the Anglican Diocese of Portsmouth respectively. However, in these cases the dioceses cover differing areas and the Anglican diocese was set up later than the Catholic one.

The Catholic Church in Scotland comprises two Latin ecclesiastical provinces each headed by a Metropolitan archbishop. In addition to the archbishop and his see, each province in turn contains a number of "suffragan" dioceses, each headed by a bishop. In Scotland there are a total of 6 such suffragan dioceses, making overall eight dioceses when the 2 archdioceses are included.

There is an Apostolic Nunciature to Great Britain which is the institutional papal diplomatic representation at full embassy level to the British authorities. The "ambassador", who in fact carries the centuries-old title of "nuncio", has relations with the government of the United Kingdom, and in a different mode with the Catholic bishops of England, Wales and Scotland. He has no dealings with the government of the Irish Republic nor with the Catholic bishops in any part of Ireland. A fellow nuncio, resident in Dublin, is a diplomat accredited to the Irish government and also has dealings with the Irish Catholic bishops both north and south of the border. Other Commonwealth territories are covered by a variety of analogous papal representatives, quite independently of the nuncio in London.

== Current Latin provinces and sees in Great Britain ==
=== Episcopal Conference of England and Wales ===
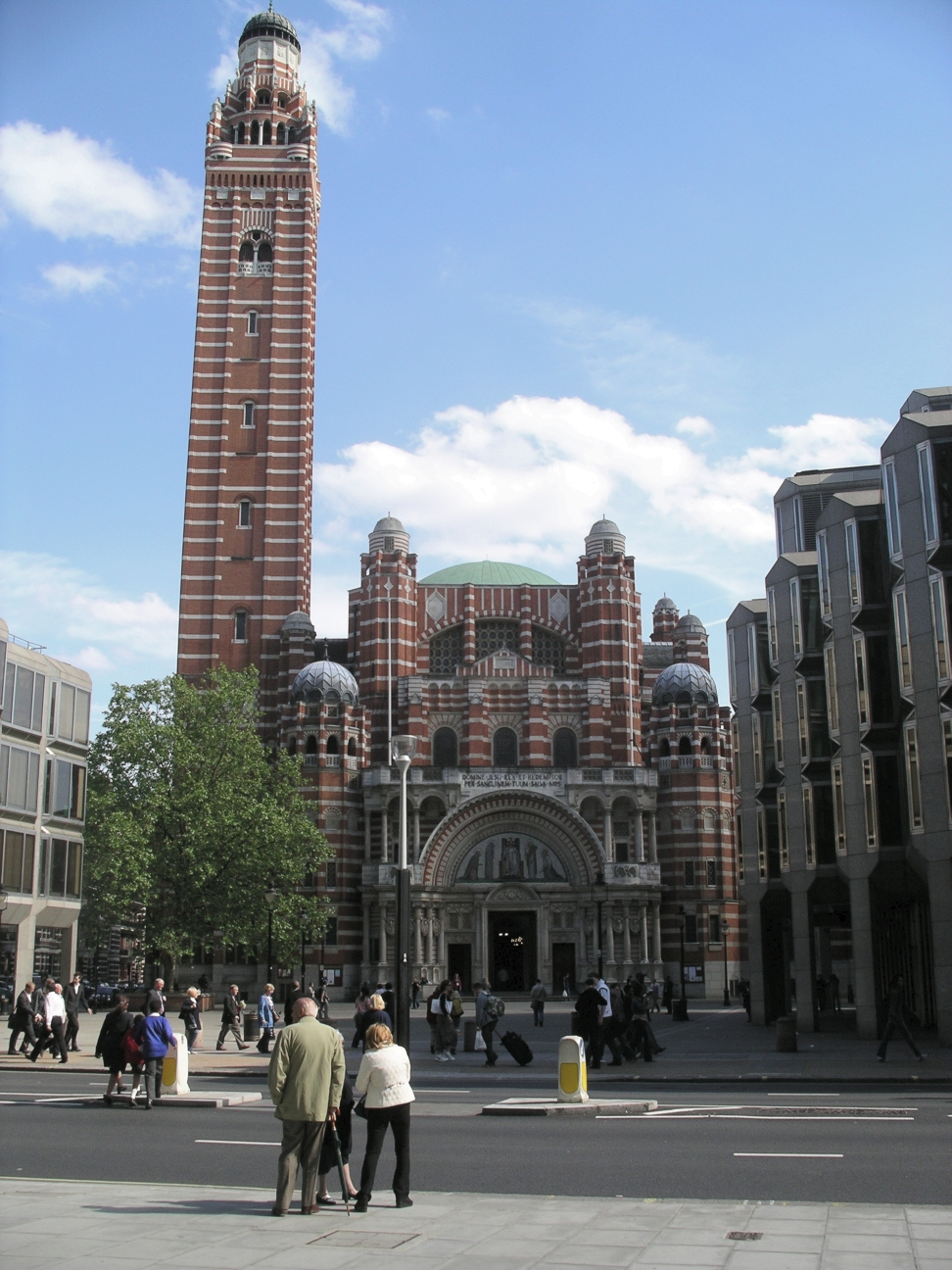
Westminster Cathedral, considered the Catholic mother-church of England and Wales

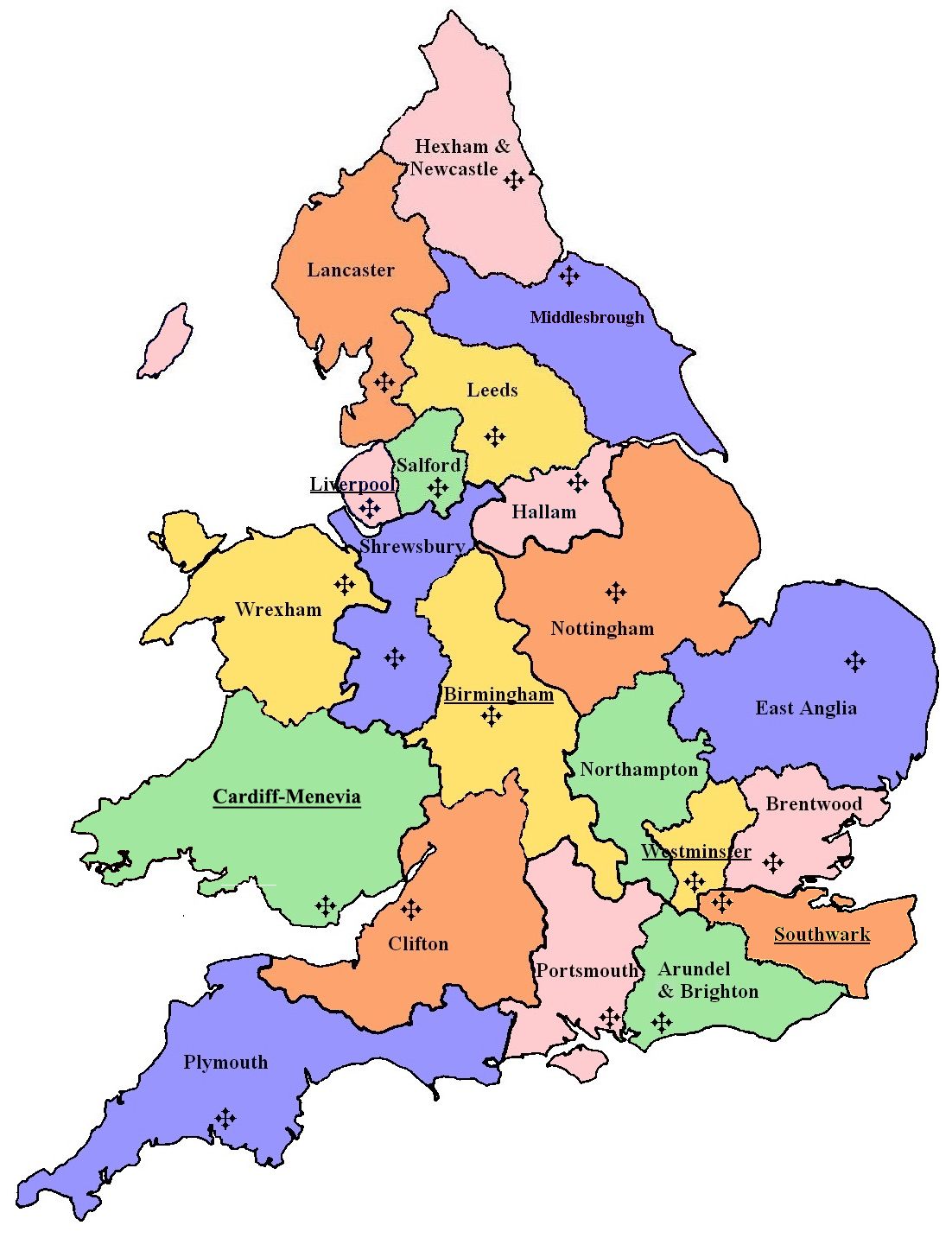
Map of Dioceses of England and Wales

England and Wales (red-brown), with the rest of the United Kingdom (light red)

==== Ecclesiastical province of Birmingham (founded 1911) ====
Diocese	Cathedral	Founded
Metropolitan Archdiocese of Birmingham	St. Chad's Cathedral	1850
Diocese of Clifton	Clifton Cathedral	1850
Diocese of Shrewsbury	Shrewsbury Cathedral	1850
Diocese
Map of the Ecclesiastical province of Birmingham

==== Ecclesiastical province of Cardiff-Menevia (founded 2024) ====
Diocese	Cathedral	Founded
Metropolitan Archdiocese of Cardiff-Menevia (heir of former Archdiocese of Cardiff founded in 1916 (in turn from Diocese of Newport founded in 1850), and Diocese of Menevia founded in 1898)	Cardiff Cathedral Swansea Cathedral (former Menevia)	2024
Diocese of Wrexham	Wrexham Cathedral	1987
Diocese
Map of the Ecclesiastical province of Cardiff

==== Ecclesiastical province of Liverpool (founded 1911) ====
Diocese	Cathedral	Founded
Metropolitan Archdiocese of Liverpool	Liverpool Metropolitan Cathedral	1850
Diocese of Hallam	Cathedral Church of St Marie	1980
Diocese of Hexham and Newcastle	St Mary's Cathedral	1850
Diocese of Lancaster	Lancaster Cathedral	1924
Diocese of Leeds	Leeds Cathedral	1878
Diocese of Middlesbrough	Middlesbrough Cathedral	1878
Diocese of Salford	Salford Cathedral	1850
Diocese
Map of the Ecclesiastical province of Liverpool

==== Ecclesiastical province of Southwark (founded 1965) ====
Diocese	Cathedral	Founded
Metropolitan Archdiocese of Southwark	St George's Cathedral	1851
Diocese of Arundel and Brighton	Arundel Cathedral	1965
Diocese of Plymouth	Plymouth Cathedral	1850
Diocese of Portsmouth	Cathedral of St John the Evangelist	1882
Diocese
Map of the Ecclesiastical province of Southwark. The Channel Islands are not shown; they are part of the Diocese of Portsmouth.

==== Ecclesiastical province of Westminster (founded 1850) ====
Diocese	Cathedral	Founded
Metropolitan Archdiocese of Westminster	Westminster Cathedral	1850
Diocese of Brentwood	Brentwood Cathedral	1917
Diocese of East Anglia	St John the Baptist Cathedral	1976
Diocese of Northampton	Northampton Cathedral	1850
Diocese of Nottingham	Nottingham Cathedral	1850
Diocese
Map of the Ecclesiastical province of Westminster

=== Episcopal conference of Scotland ===
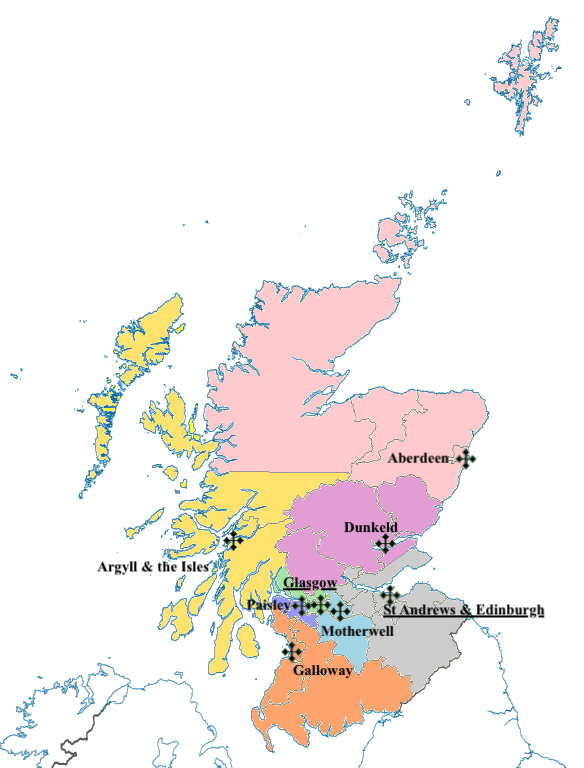
Map of dioceses in Scotland

==== Ecclesiastical province of Saint Andrews and Edinburgh ====
- Metropolitan Archdiocese of Saint Andrews and Edinburgh (cathedral St Mary's Metropolitan Cathedral, Edinburgh; established 1878)
  - Diocese of Aberdeen (cathedral St Mary's Cathedral, Aberdeen; established 1878)
  - Diocese of Argyll and the Isles (cathedral St Columba's Cathedral, Oban; established 1878; originally in the Province of Glasgow)
  - Diocese of Dunkeld (cathedral St Andrew's Cathedral, Dundee; established 1878)
  - Diocese of Galloway (cathedral St Margaret's Cathedral, Ayr; established 1878; originally in the Province of Glasgow)

==== Ecclesiastical province of Glasgow ====
- Metropolitan Archdiocese of Glasgow (cathedral St Andrew's Cathedral, Glasgow; established 1878)
  - Diocese of Motherwell (cathedral Cathedral of Our Lady of Good Aid, Motherwell; established 1947)
  - Diocese of Paisley (cathedral St Mirin's Cathedral, Paisley; established 1947)

== Eastern Catholic and other exempt ==
- The Bishopric of the Forces in Great Britain (1917) is the Military Ordinariate for all British armed forces, even outside the UK
- The Syro-Malabar Catholic Eparchy of Great Britain (2016)
- The Ukrainian Catholic Eparchy of Holy Family of London (1957)
- The Syro-Malankara Catholic Church UK (2025)

The Eastern Catholic Churches are autonomous, self-governing particular churches in full communion with the Pope.

- The Personal Ordinariate of Our Lady of Walsingham (2011) is one of three Personal Ordinariates. The ordinariates were established in order to enable "groups of Anglicans" to join the Catholic Church while preserving elements of their liturgical and spiritual patrimony. Personal Ordinariates are headed by Ordinaries.

== Defunct jurisdictions ==
- Archpriest of England from 1598 to 1621.
- Apostolic Vicariate of England from 1623 to 1688 when it was divided into four districts that lasted until a general redivision in 1840:

- Apostolic Vicariate of the London District until 1850
- Apostolic Vicariate of the Western District until 1850
- Apostolic Vicariate of the Midland District until 1840
- Apostolic Vicariate of the Northern District until 1850

- Apostolic Vicariate of the Welsh District created from Western District in 1840 until 1850
- Apostolic Vicariate of the Central District created from Midland District in 1840 until 1850
- Apostolic Vicariate of the Eastern District created from Midland District in 1840 until 1850
- Apostolic Vicariate of the Lancashire District created from the Northern District in 1840 until 1850
- Apostolic Vicariate of the Yorkshire District created from the Northern District in 1840 until 1850

- Diocese of Beverley, from 1850 to 1878, replaced by the Diocese of Leeds and the Diocese of Middlesbrough.
- Diocese of Newport and Menevia, from 1850 to 1895, replaced by the Diocese of Newport, which became the Archdiocese of Cardiff in 1916, and the Apostolic Vicariate of Wales, which became the Diocese of Menevia in 1898.
- Prefecture Apostolic of Scotland from 1653 to 1694.
- Apostolic Vicariate of Scotland from 1694 to 1727 when it split into two districts that lasted until 1827:

- Apostolic Vicariate of the Lowland District
- Apostolic Vicariate of the Highland District

- Apostolic Vicariate of the Eastern District from 1827 to 1878 when it became the Archdiocese of St Andrews and Edinburgh.
- Apostolic Vicariate of the Western District from 1827 to 1878 when it became the Archdiocese of Glasgow
- Apostolic Vicariate of the Northern District from 1827 to 1878 when it became the Diocese of Aberdeen.

== See also ==
- List of Catholic dioceses (structured view) (including archdioceses)
- List of Catholic dioceses (alphabetical) (including archdioceses)
- List of Catholic archdioceses (by country and continent)
- Apostolic Nunciature to Great Britain
- Catholic Church in England and Wales
- List of Catholic bishops in Great Britain
- List of Catholic churches in the United Kingdom

Scotland

- Catholic Church in Scotland
- Bishops' Conference of Scotland
- Category:Roman Catholic cathedrals in Scotland

== Sources and external links ==
- GCatholic.org - England and Wales
- Catholic-Hierarchy entry

Scotland

- GCatholic.org - Scotland
- Catholic-Hierarchy Scotland
- Edinburgh Statistics
- Glasgow Statistics
