= Brentwood Cathedral =

Catholic cathedral in England

- The Cathedral of St Mary and St Helen
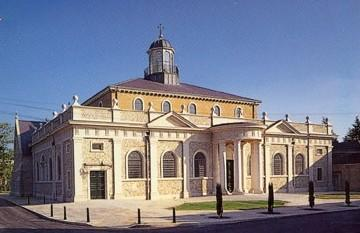

- Location within Essex
- 51°37′10″N 0°18′23″E
- OS grid reference: TQ 59772 93724
- Location: Brentwood, Essex
- Country: England
- Denomination: Catholic Church
- Sui iuris church: Latin Church

History
- Consecrated: 1991

Architecture
- Previous cathedrals: Enlarged by Quinlan Terry in 1991
- Architect: Quinlan Terry
- Architectural type: New Classical
- Style: Gothic Revival, English Baroque
- Years built: 1989–1991

Specifications
- Capacity: 1600

Administration
- Province: Westminster
- Archdiocese: Westminster
- Diocese: Brentwood

Clergy
- Archbishop: Cardinal Vincent Nichols of Westminster, England
- Bishop: Rt. Rev Fr Alan Williams
- Dean: Canon John Harvey

The Cathedral of St Mary and St Helen is a Catholic cathedral in Brentwood, Essex, England. It is the seat of the Diocese of Brentwood.

== History ==
Brentwood Cathedral began in 1861 as a parish church built in a Gothic style. This relatively small building was raised to cathedral status in 1917. Between 1989 and 1991 the church was enlarged in an Italianate classical style by the Driehaus Prize winner Quinlan Terry, replacing an earlier extension made in 1974.

The new Brentwood Cathedral was dedicated by Cardinal Hume on 31 May 1991. The donors chose to remain anonymous and the money was given solely for this purpose.

In 2022 the cathedral was listed at Grade II*.

== Architecture ==
The architect Quinlan Terry took his inspiration from the early Italian Renaissance crossed with the English Baroque of Christopher Wren. This, it was felt, would be appropriate for the town and its conservation area, but above all it would provide the right space and light for the liturgy to be celebrated. The cathedral was designed along a square plan, focussed on the high altar, placed in the nave to accommodate the changes in liturgical fashion after the Second Vatican Council.

Work began in 1989 and was completed two years later. The north elevation consists of nine bays each divided by Doric pilasters. This is broken by a huge half-circular portico, which was inspired by a similar one at St Paul's. The handmade traditional Smeed Dean brick of the clerestory leads up to the octagonal lantern, or cupola, the high point both of the outside and inside.

A conscious decision was taken to retain part of the Gothic Revival church of 1861 alongside the new classical cathedral. The east elevation juxtaposes the old and the new, linking them through the scale of the 1991 building and the use of ragstone and Welsh slate roof tiles.

All the classical architectural orders are represented in the interior: the four giant Doric pilasters, the Tuscan arcade of arches, the Ionic pilasters of the Palladian windows in the east and west aisles, the Corinthian and Composite influences evident on the cathedral and the organ case.

While the interior of the cathedral has a deliberately "restrained" feeling to it, richness is to be found in the ceiling. The Roman key pattern and the double guilloche pattern, picked out in gold leaf, are dominant here. All the round-headed windows are in the style of Wren, with clear leaded lights of hand-made glass.

With clear windows on all four sides, the cathedral is flooded with light at any time of the day. This and the white walls and stone floor combine to give a translucent effect which uplifts the spirit and conveys its own sense of the presence of God. The cathedral is lit by brass English Classical chandeliers (one of which was formerly in the church at Epping) and, above the cornice, concealed lighting.

The processional cross is a copy of a medieval design. The figure represents a transitional period in the theology of design where Christ still wears the crown of the Risen Lord, but the corpus is that of the crucified Saviour. The Bishop's chair or cathedra is a tangible sign of his presiding over the diocese. It was made in Pisa, in Nabrassina stone, and has steps of Portland stone. In the centre is the coat of arms of the diocese. The base of the seat is inlaid with slate, to match the floor.

Consecration crosses are incised into the stone of the Doric pilasters that hold up the clerestory. They were anointed like the altar, as a sign that the whole building is dedicated to God. On the feast of the Dedication the candles in front of the gilded crosses are lit. In the east aisle, there are two rooms set aside to celebrate the Sacrament of Reconciliation or Confession. Opposite them is a crucifix, formerly in the church at Stock, Essex.

Around the arcade are terracotta roundels representing the fifteen Stations of the Cross. These were modelled by Raphael Maklouf, the well-known sculptor, who was responsible for the Queen's head on Commonwealth coinage from 1985 to 1997. Their milky glaze perfectly complements the subtlety and intimacy with which the familiar scenes have been expressed.

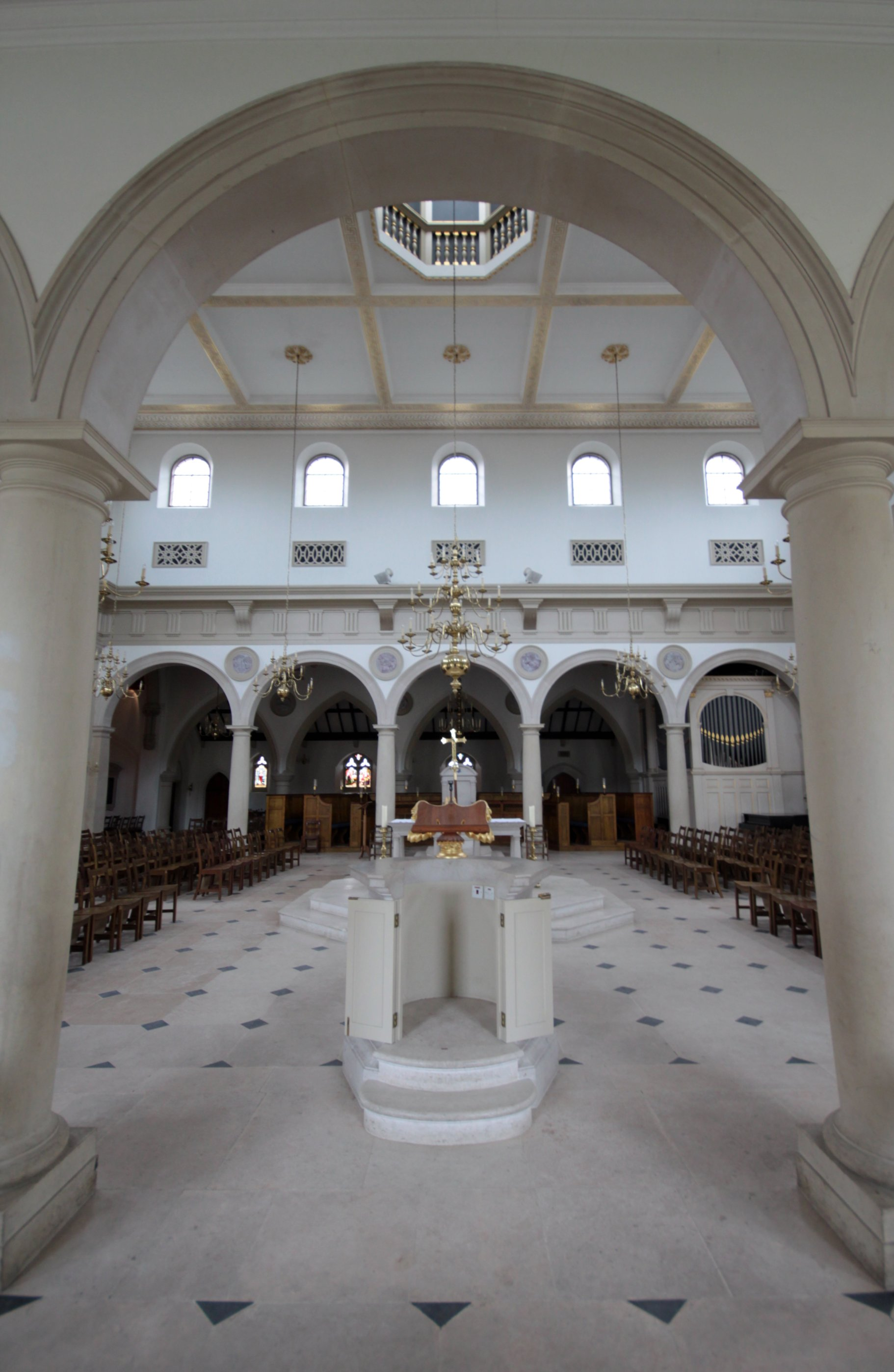
Interior

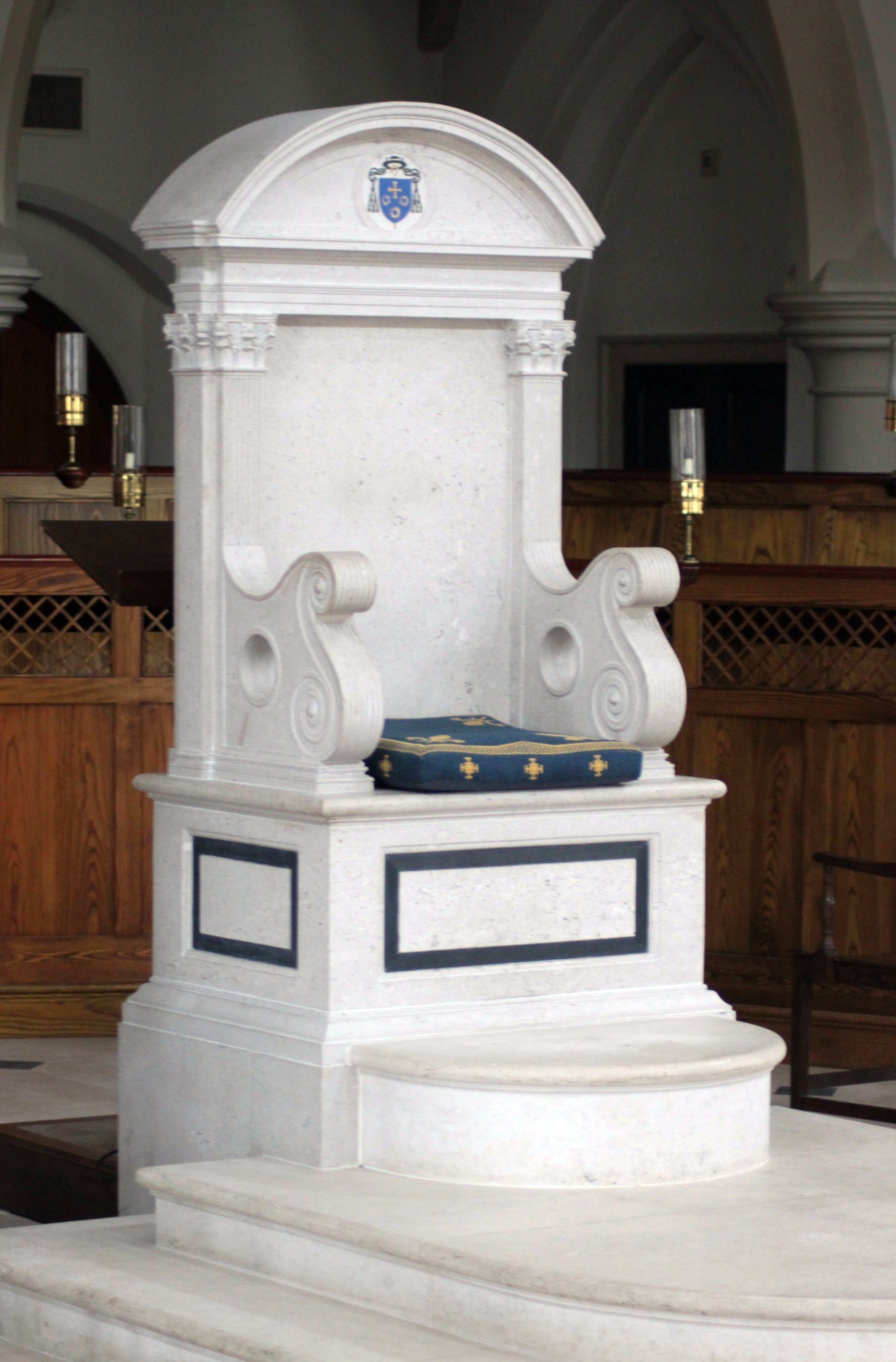
Cathedra

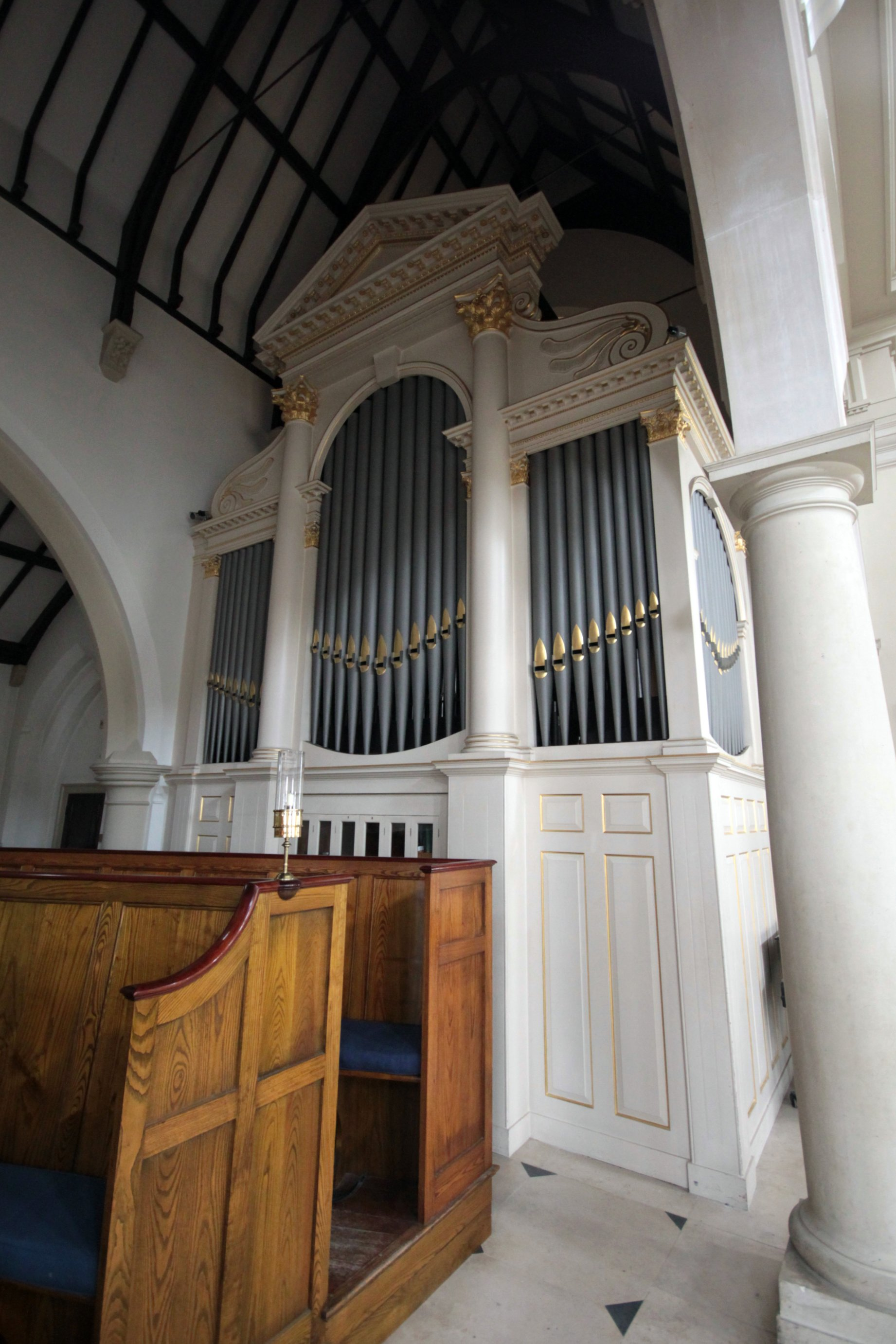
Organ

== Music ==
The music in the cathedral and diocese is overseen by Brentwood Cathedral Music. The Master of Music of Brentwood Cathedral is Andrew Wright, former Assistant Master of Music at Westminster Cathedral. He was appointed in 1982 and is also Director of Diocesan Music. He founded the cathedral choir in 1984, and over the years the choir has expanded from the original boys' choir of some thirty voices to its present membership, which includes the choir ladies and gentlemen together with the cathedral lay clerks. The cathedral also has over ten boy choristers and over twenty girl choristers which the assistant music director, Art Wangcharoensab, directs and runs.

For several years a number of recordings and broadcasts on BBC Radio have been made and tours undertaken in Austria, Belgium, France, Germany, the Netherlands and Ireland. The Choir is affiliated to the RSCM and has musical and ecumenical links with the Diocese of Chelmsford and Chelmsford Cathedral Choir, involving liturgical events and also shared training through the Bishops' Chorister Award.

The organ came from the redundant Anglican church of St Mary-at-the-Walls in Colchester, as a gift from the Diocese of Chelmsford. Dating from 1889 by Hunter and rebuilt in 1931, it was completely rebuilt and restored by Percy Daniel & Co Ltd. of Clevedon.

== See also ==
- Bishop of Brentwood
- Bishop Thomas McMahon
- Bishop George Andrew Beck
- Quinlan Terry
