= Our Lady Immaculate Church, Chelmsford =

Our Lady Immaculate Church
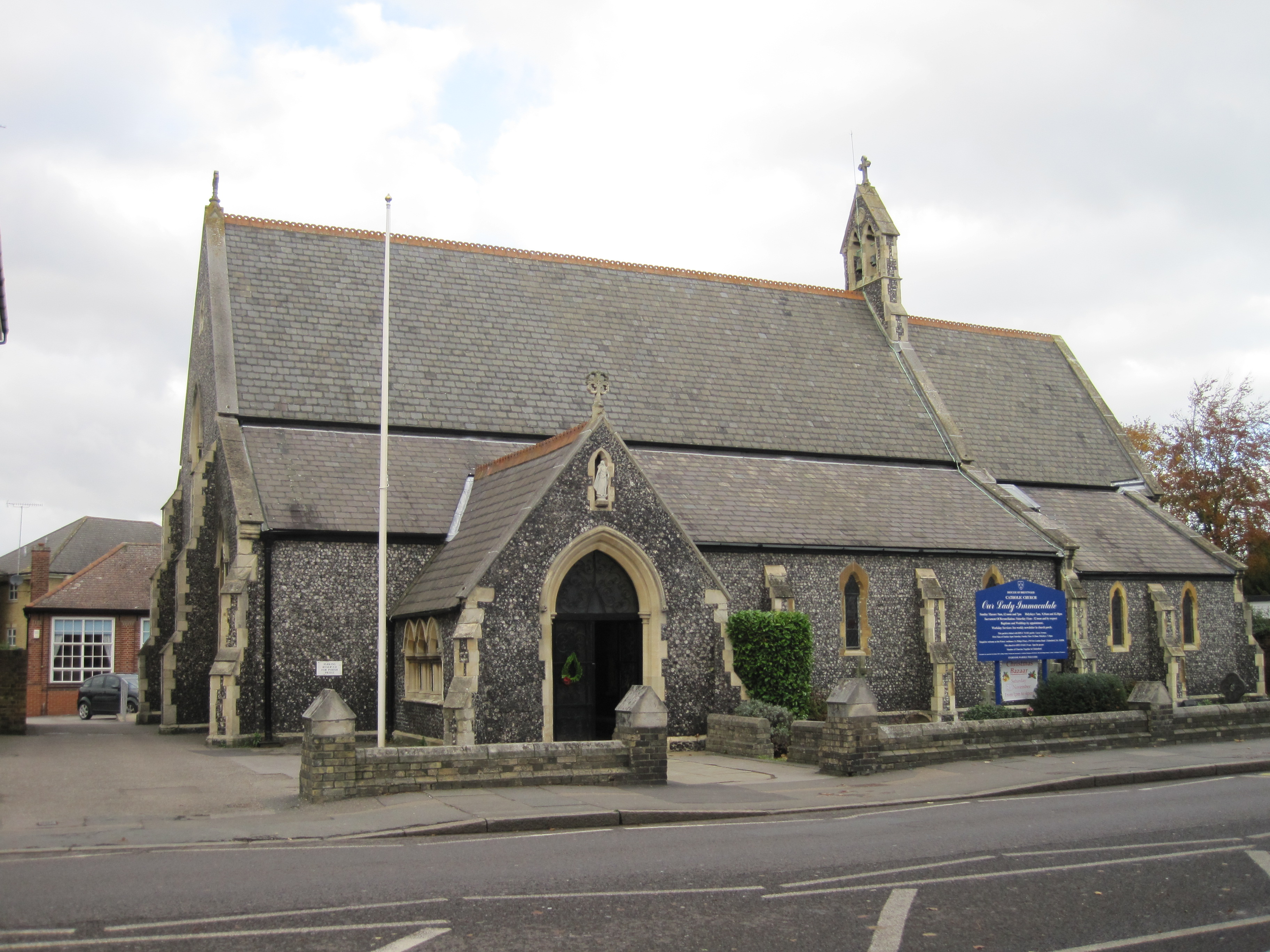
- Our Lady Immaculate Church
- 51.729093°N 0.467766°E
- Location: Chelmsford, Essex
- Country: England
- Denomination: Roman Catholic
- Website: ChelmsfordCatholic.co.uk

History
- Former name: Immaculate Conception
- Status: Parish church
- Dedication: Blessed Virgin Mary

Architecture
- Functional status: Active
- Architect: Joseph John Scoles
- Style: Gothic Revival
- Completed: October 1847

Administration
- Province: Westminster
- Diocese: Brentwood
- Deanery: Mid-Essex

Our Lady Immaculate Church (formerly the Church of the Immaculate Conception) is a Roman Catholic Parish church in Chelmsford, Essex, England. It was founded in 1845, opened in 1847 and designed by Joseph John Scoles. It is situated on New London Road, next to Our Lady Immaculate Primary School, close to the junction with Anchor Street, in the city centre.

== History ==
=== Foundation ===
In 1840, the site for the church was bought. It was purchased from Charles King, the father of the first mission priest to the area. In 1845, the mission to Catholic population in Chelmsford was founded.

=== Construction ===
In October 1847, the church was opened by the then Vicar Apostolic of the London District, Nicholas Wiseman. In 1850, he became Archbishop of Westminster and a cardinal. The church was originally dedicated to the Immaculate Conception. The architect was Joseph John Scoles. The main benefactors of the church were Charles King and William Petre, 12th Baron Petre. It was Lord Petre who chose Scoles to design the church. The church was built in the Gothic Revival style by the builders, Messrs Curtis of Stratford. The Lady altar in the church was originally in Thorndon Hall, home of Lord Petre. The east window in the church was made in Newcastle upon Tyne by Thomas Dunn and inspired by a design of Augustus Pugin.

=== Developments ===
In 1973, the church was reordered and extended. A new altar was consecrated by the Bishop of Brentwood, Patrick Casey. In 1982, the church's dedication was changed the Immaculate Conception to Our Lady Immaculate. In 1985, the present organ was installed. It was brought from a United Reformed Church in Felsted. In 1988, the crucifix hanging over the altar in front of the nave was installed, it was designed by William Gordon.

== Parish ==
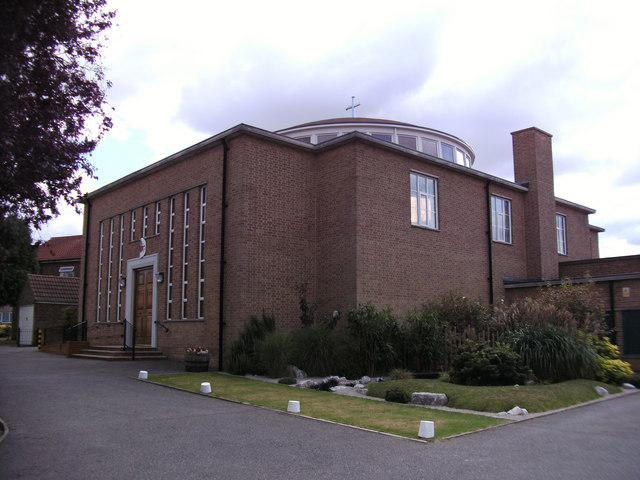
Holy Name Church, Chelmsford, also served by the Premonstratensians

From 2008 to 2022, the church was served by the Order of Canons Regular of Prémontré, also known as the Premonstratensians or Norbertines, from St. Philip's Priory. They also served another parish, Holy Name Church in Chelmsford. Holy Name Church was built in 1965 and is on the corner of Lucas Avenue and Gloucester Avenue in the Moulsham Lodge area of Chelmsford. Holy Name Church has two Sunday Masses: 6:00pm on Saturday and 10:30am on Sunday.

Our Lady Immaculate Church has three Sunday Masses: 9:00am, 12:00pm and 7:00pm.

== Interior ==
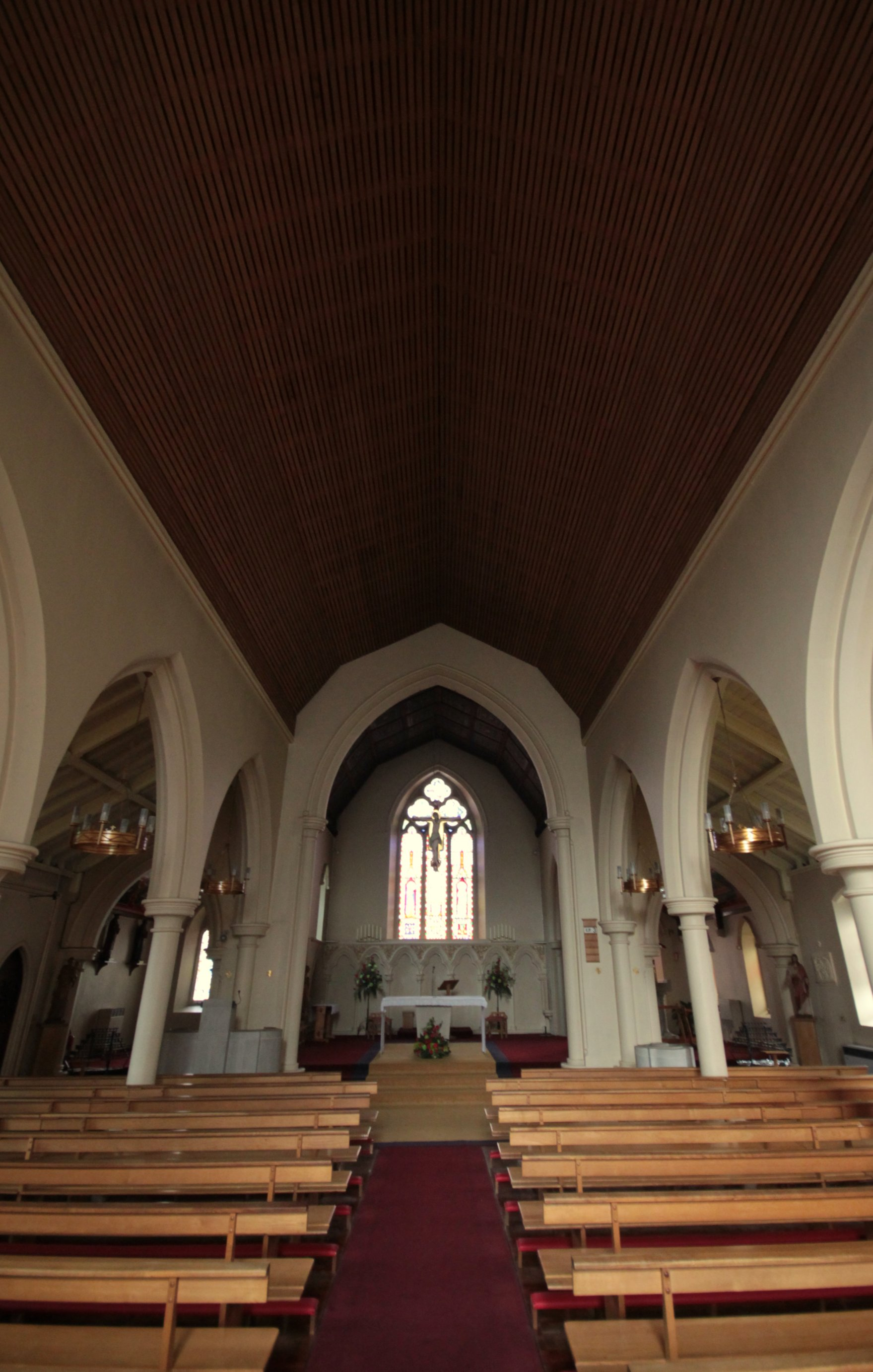
Church nave

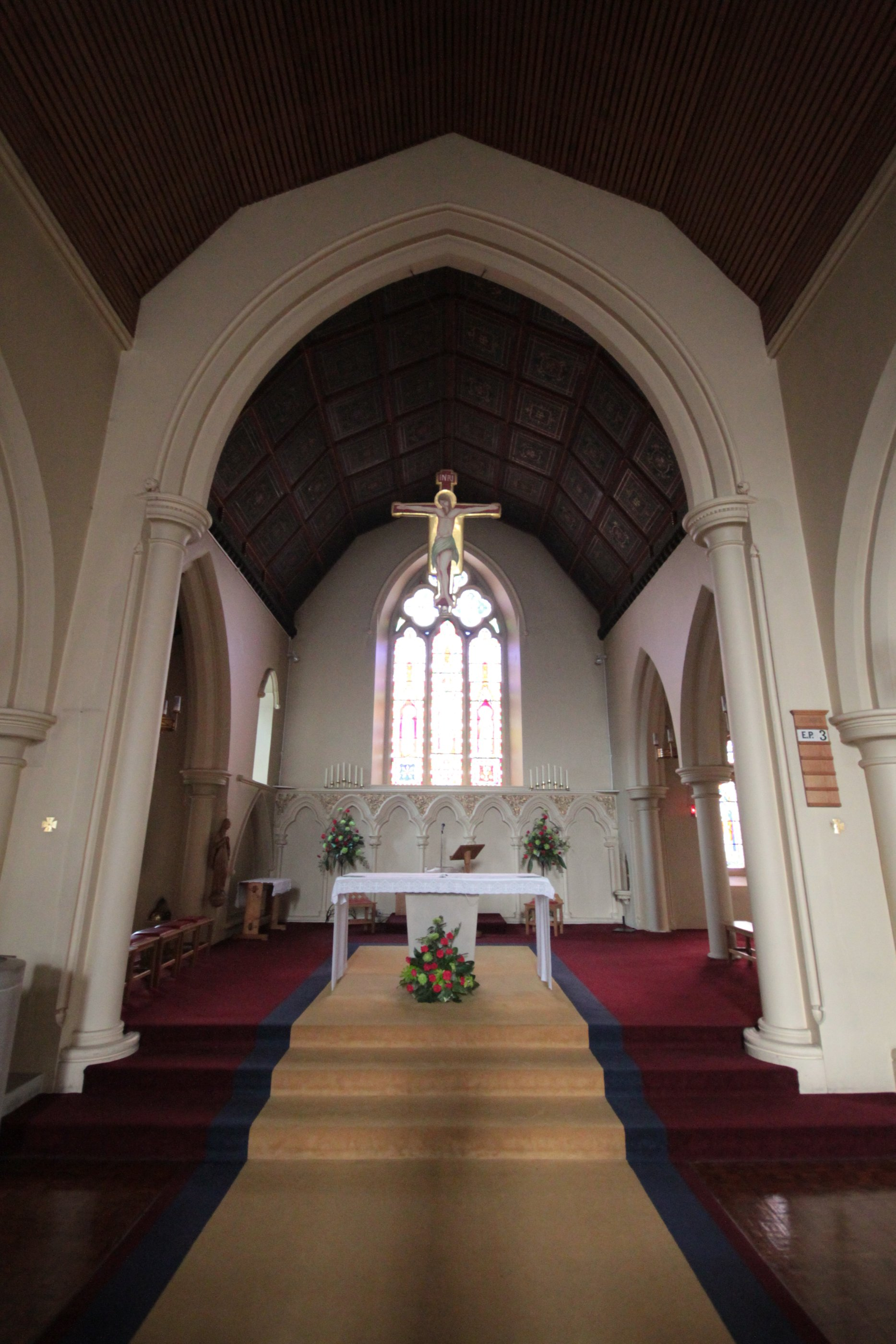
Altar

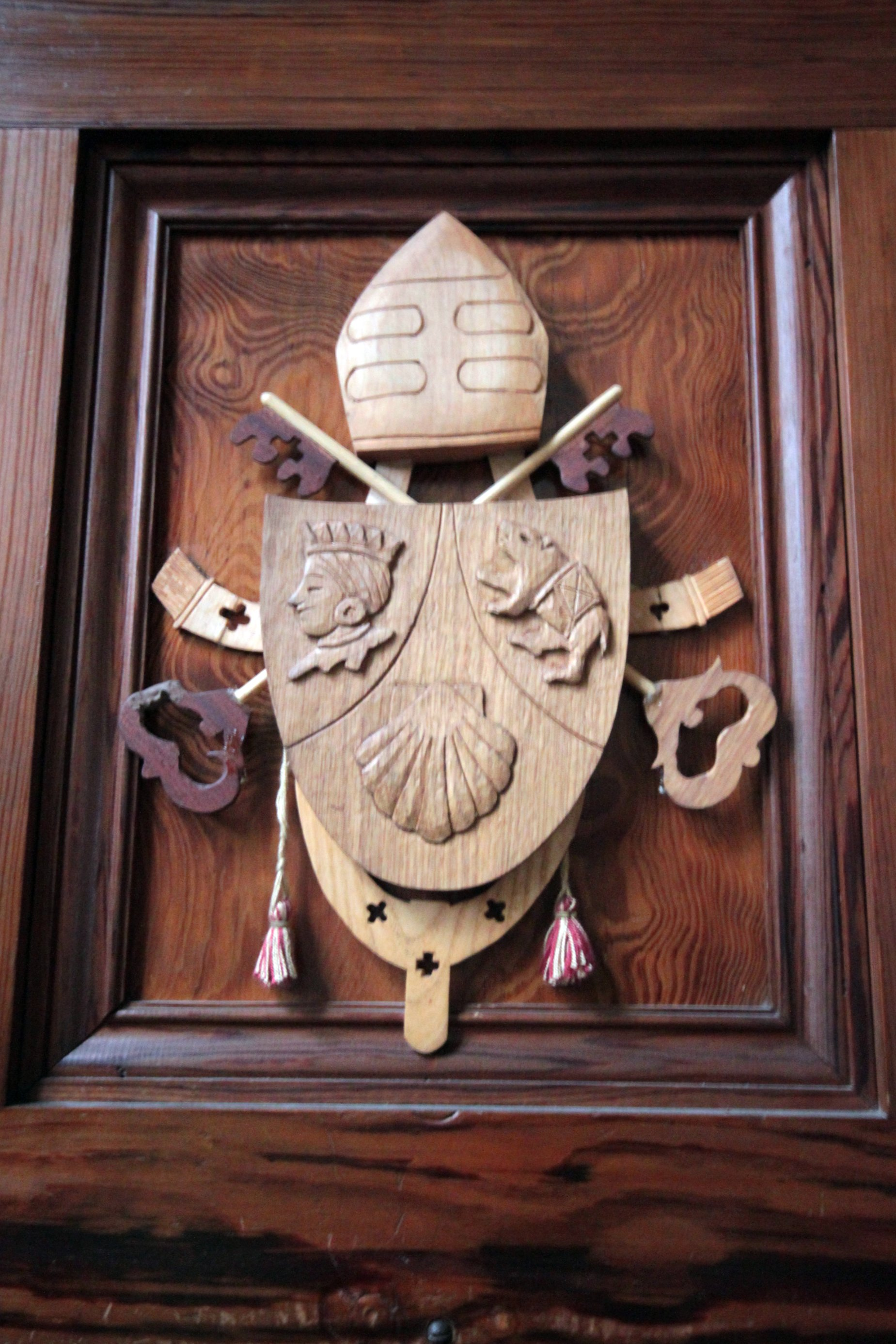
Pope Benedict XVI's coat of arms on the organ

== See also ==
- Roman Catholic Diocese of Brentwood
