= St. Philip's Priory =

Monastery in Chelmsford, Essex, England

Coordinates: 51°43′38.07″N 0°27′49.09″E

St. Philip's Priory situated on New London Road in Chelmsford, Essex, UK was a Premonstratensian priory of canons regular. It was dedicated to Our Lady Queen of Sorrows and St. Philip Benizi. In the summer of 2022, the canonry relocated to London, founding the Priory of Our Lady of Sorrows, Peckham, in the Archdiocese of Southwark. St Philip's returned to the care of the Diocese of Brentwood.

The site of St Philip's Priory was formerly a private house, but was brought by Mr. Henry Shepperd in 1927 for the purpose of installing a community of Servite nuns. The priory and chapel were solemnly blessed and opened on 15 September 1927, the feast of Our Lady of Sorrows, by Arthur Doubleday, Bishop of Brentwood. The Servites ran the priory and an adjoining school until the 1990s when the house was purchased by the diocese for use as a presbytery for the nearby parish of Our Lady Immaculate. The Premonstratensian community, which had originally been founded in 2004 in Manchester, established their home at the priory in October 2008 at the request of Bishop Thomas McMahon of Brentwood. In September 2022, the house became a presbytery for local parishes once more.

The Premonstratensians served the parish of Our Lady Immaculate on New London Road, together with that of Holy Name, in the Moulsham Lodge area of Chelmsford. The canons also functioned in other roles, such as in academia and chaplaincy work. They now engage in similar ministries in their London priory, serving the parish of Our Lady of Sorrows, Peckham.

In 2016, Fr Hugh Allan O.Praem., Prior of Norbertine Community of St Philip's Priory, was appointed the Apostolic Administrator of the Prefecture of the Falkland Islands and Ecclesiastical Superior of the Missions of the islands of Ascension, St Helena and Tristan da Cunha. In keeping with his appointment, he was also given the title of titular Abbot of Beeleigh. Before the Reformation the Premonstratensians had a house at Beeleigh Abbey in Maldon and owned land throughout Essex, including in the Moulsham area where St. Philip's Priory stood.
