= Palazzo Bartoli Corbini =

Palace in Italy

Coordinates: 43.7754°N 11.2564°E

The Palazzo Bartoli Corbini, also known as Palazzo Naldini or Pestellini, is a palace located on Via Cavour #8 in central Florence, region of Tuscany Italy.

The palace was designed by the architect Bartolomeo Ammannati.

== See also ==
- Palazzo Naldini
