= Timothy Menezes =

British Roman Catholic prelate

The Right Reverend Timothy Menezes
- Bishop-Elect of Brentwood
- Church: Roman Catholic Church
- See: Diocese of Brentwood
- Appointed: 10 October 2026
- Predecessor: Alan Williams

Orders
- Ordination: July 22, 1995
- Consecration: July 16, 2024 by Bernard Longley

Personal details
- Born: July 18, 1970 (age 56) Edgbaston, Birmingham, United Kindgom
- Education: St Mary’s College, Oscott; Venerable English College

Styles of Timothy Menezes
- Reference style: The Right Reverend
- Spoken style: Your Excellency
- Informal style: Bishop
- See: Bishop of Brentwood

Timothy Francis Menezes (born July 18, 1970), is an English Roman Catholic Bishop, he is the current Auxiliary Bishop of Birmingham since July 2024. On the 10th of October 2026, it was announced that Pope Leo XIV appointed him to serve as the next Bishop of Brentwood.

== Biography ==
On July 18, 1970. Timothy Menezes was born in Edgbaston, a suburb of Birmingham. He then studied for his Formation to the Priesthood at St Mary's College, Oscott and the Venerable English College in Rome, Italy. He was ordained a priest at St Dunstan's Church in Kings Heath on 22 July 1995.

After few years serving as Assistant Parish Priest in Redditch, he was appointed the Secretary of the Archbishop of Birmingham in 2000. Then 4 years later, he took up his position as Parish Priest at St. Thomas More Church in Coventry. In 2011 he was appointed Vicar General of the Birmingham Archdiocese and 8 years later Dean at St. Chad's Cathedral.

On 25 April 2024, Pope Francis appoints Menezes as the Auxiliary Bishop of Birmingham and Titular Bishop of Thugga, his episcopal consecration was held on 14 July 2024, at St. Chad's Cathedral by Bernard Longley, Archbishop of Birmingham.
