= Naldini =

Naldini is a surname. Notable people with the surname include:

- Giovanni Battista Naldini (1535–1591), Italian painter
- Nico Naldini (born 1929), Italian novelist, poet and film director
- Paolo Naldini (1632–1713), Italian Roman Catholic bishop
- Pietro Paolo Naldini (1619–1691), Italian sculptor
