= Peregrine Laziosi =

Italian Roman Catholic saint

Saint Peregrine Laziosi O.S.M.
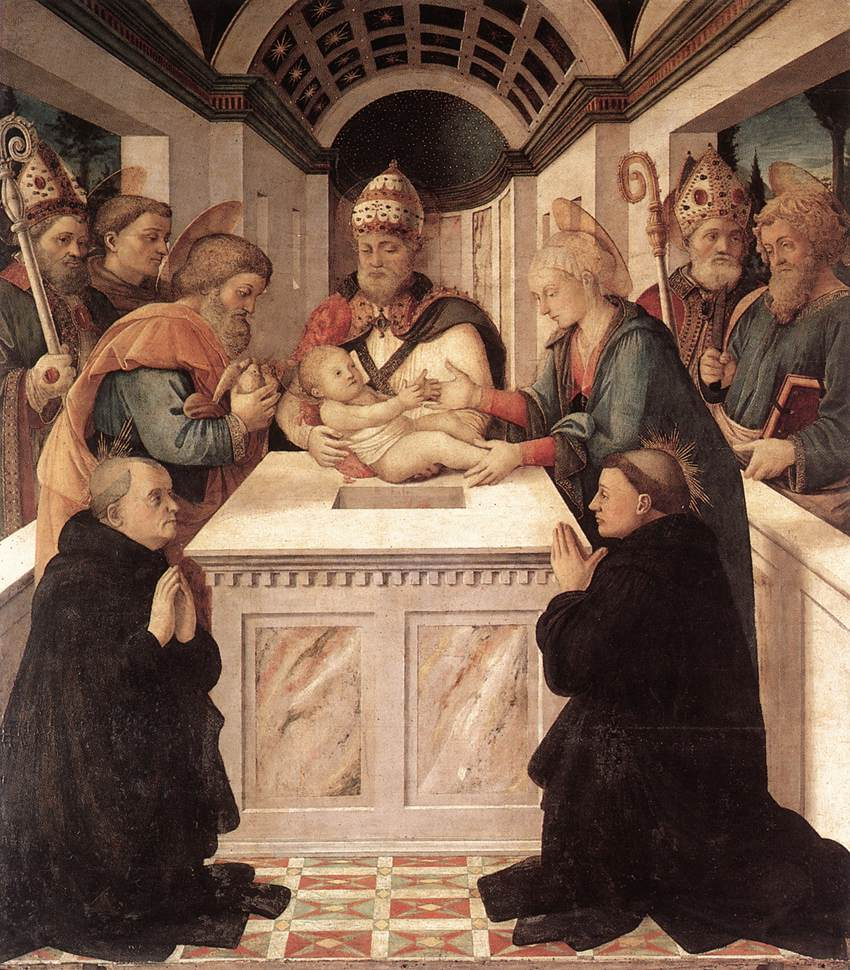
- Filippo Lippi, Presentation in the Temple, with St. Philip Benizi on the left and St. Peregrine Laziosi on the right

Confessor
- Born: 1 November 1260, Forlì, Italy
- Died: 1 May 1345
- Venerated in: Roman Catholic Church
- Beatified: 15 April 1609, Saint Peter's Basilica, Rome, Papal States by Pope Paul V
- Canonized: 27 December 1726, Saint Peter's Basilica, Rome, Papal States by Pope Benedict XIII
- Feast: 1 May
- Attributes: one leg covered in a cancerous sore, a staff
- Patronage: persons suffering from cancer, AIDS, and other life-threatening illnesses

Peregrine Laziosi (Pellegrino Latiosi; c. 1260 – 1 May 1345) is an Italian saint of the Servite Order (Friar Order Servants of Mary). He is the patron saint for persons suffering from cancer, AIDS, and other life-threatening illnesses.

== Life ==
Peregrine Laziosi was born in 1260, the only son of an affluent family in Forlì, in northern Italy. At that time Forlì was part of the Papal States. Peregrine's family supported the anti-papal faction. In 1283, the residents of Forlì were under interdict. Philip Benizi, Prior General of the Friar Servants of Saint Mary, was sent to try to reconcile the divided community. While trying to preach in Forlì, Philip was heckled and struck by the 18-year-old Laziosi. He was driven from the city with insults and violence. Laziosi repented and asked Philip for forgiveness. Benizi received him with kindness. The moment had a profound effect on Laziosi. Filled with remorse, he began to pray more and to channel his energies into good works. A few years later, he joined the Servites in Siena and went on to be ordained a priest.

Statue in the Peregrine Chapel of the Serra Chapel in Mission San Juan Capistrano

After some years, he was sent back to Forlì, where he founded a new Servite house there and became well known for his preaching and holiness as well as his devotion to the sick and poor. It is said that he miraculously multiplied grain and wine during a severe shortage in his area. People took to calling him the "Angel of Good Counsel", so grateful were they for his wise advice so freely given.

One of the special penances he imposed on himself was to stand whenever it was not necessary to sit. When tired, he would support himself on a choir stall. At the age of 60, he developed an infection in his right leg. His condition deteriorated to the point that the physician decided to amputate his leg.

The night before the operation, Laziosi spent time praying before a fresco of the crucifixion in the chapter room. He fell into a deep trance-like sleep and seemed to see Jesus descend from the cross to touch his leg.

The following day, the doctor arrived to perform the amputation, and, finding no sign of the cancer, news of the miraculous cure spread throughout the town. This only increased the people's regard for Laziosi. He died of a fever on 1 May 1345, at the age of 84. An extraordinary number of people from the town and countryside honored his death. Some of the sick who came were healed, which was attributed to his intercession.

== Veneration ==
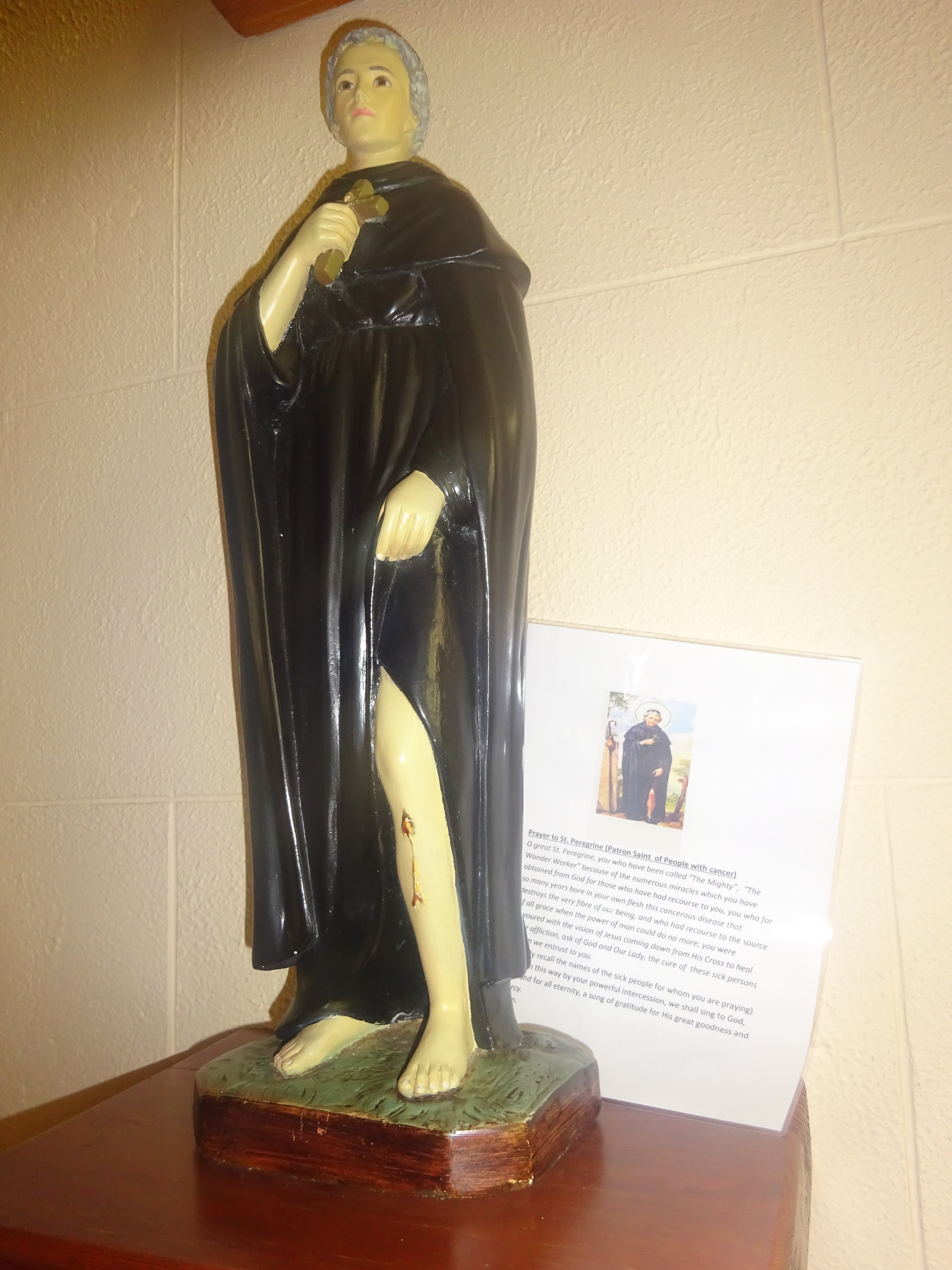
Statue of St Peregrine, showing his tumorous leg

His body rests in the Servite church of Forlì, the Basilica of Saint Pellegrino Laziosi. Pope Paul V declared him blessed in 1609 and Pope Benedict XIII canonized him in 1726. The liturgical feast of Peregrine Laziosi is on 1 May.

Laziosi is considered the patron saint of those suffering from cancer. The National Shrine of Saint Peregrine is located at Our Lady of Sorrows Basilica in Chicago, Illinois, as a ministry of the Friar Servants of Mary. There is a St. Peregrine Shrine at The Grotto, at The National Sanctuary of Our Sorrowful Mother, in Portland, Oregon. A Saint Peregrine Mass is celebrated at The Grotto on the first Saturday of each month at 12 noon in the Chapel of Mary. and there is also a St. Peregrine Laziosi Parish and Diocesan Shrine in Muntinlupa, Philippines. It houses a relic taken from Laziosi himself: a rib. It is currently on display in the church's Relic Chapel. There is a Saint Peregrine Cancer Shrine with Perpetual Eucharistic Adoration at Christ the King Catholic Church in Mesa, Arizona. The mission of this St. Peregrine Shrine is to promote perpetual adoration of Jesus Christ and to pray for those affected by cancer. In the midst of suffering, a sanctuary for spiritual healing and emotional peace is offered. There is also a statue of Laziosi in the dedicated side chapel off the Serra mission chapel of San Juan Capistrano in Southern California.

== Legacy ==
According to some, the lesson of Laziosi's life is not that God worked a miracle, but that a faithful servant placed himself, unconditionally, in the hands of God. Laziosi's trust in God therefore serves as a model for those dealing with sickness. One medical journal has cited Laziosi's case as a potential instance of bacterial or viral infection eradicating cancerous cells.

== Gallery ==
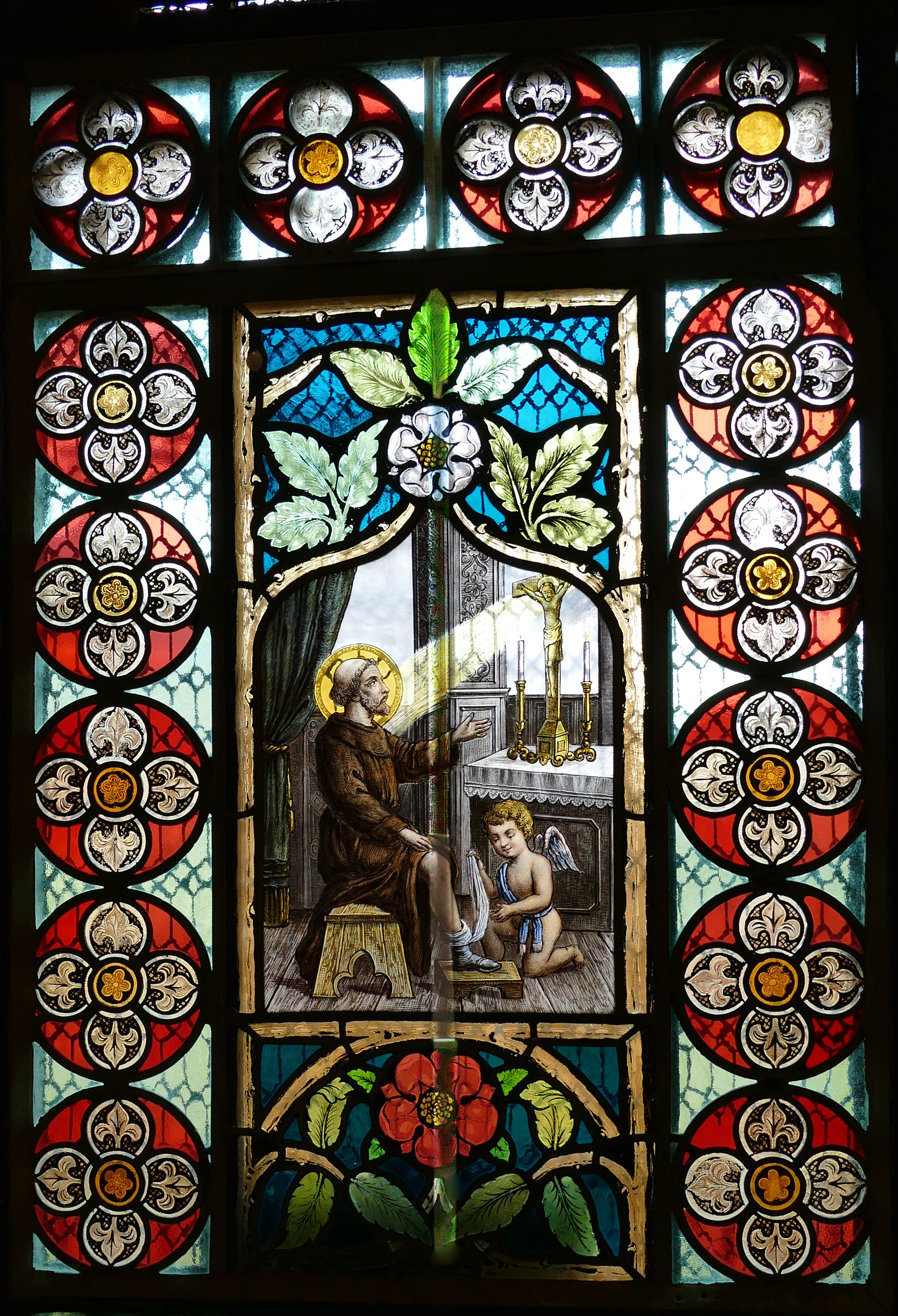
Stained glass depicting Saint Peregrine at Cholera Chapel, Heiligenkreuz

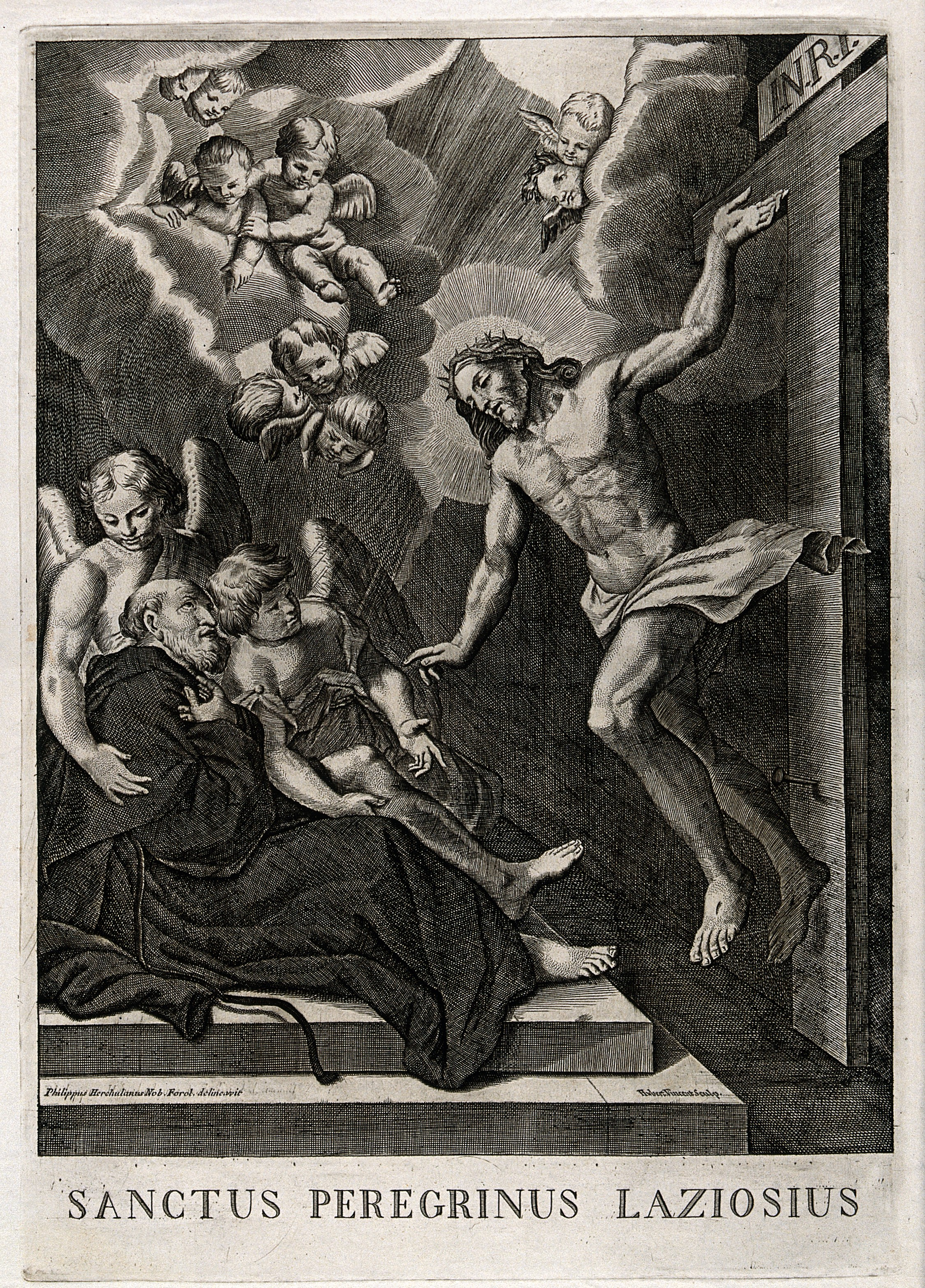
Engraving of Saint Peregrine by A. Vincent

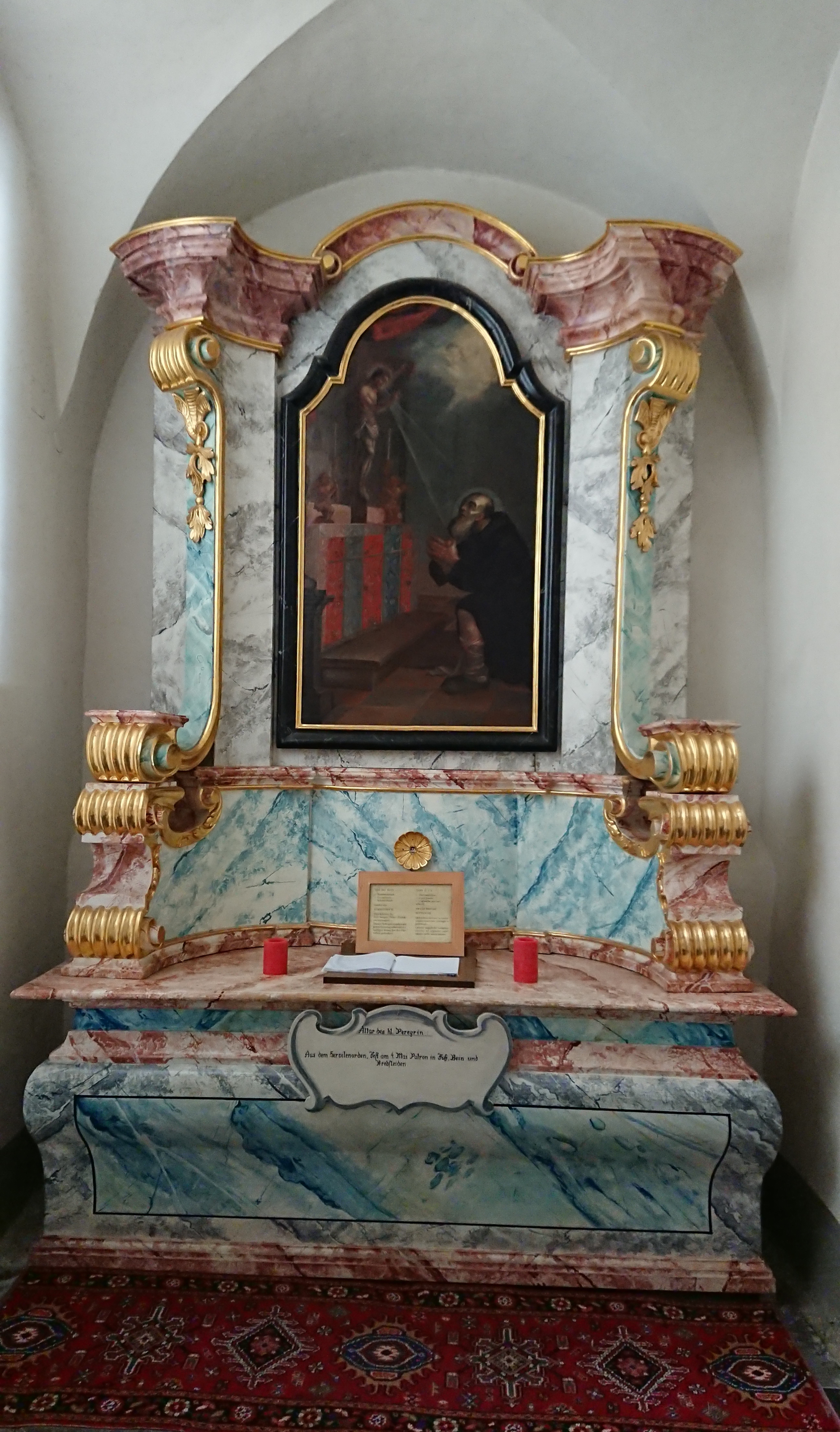
Altar with Saint Peregrine at Pilgrimage Church Maria Schnee (Maria Luggau)

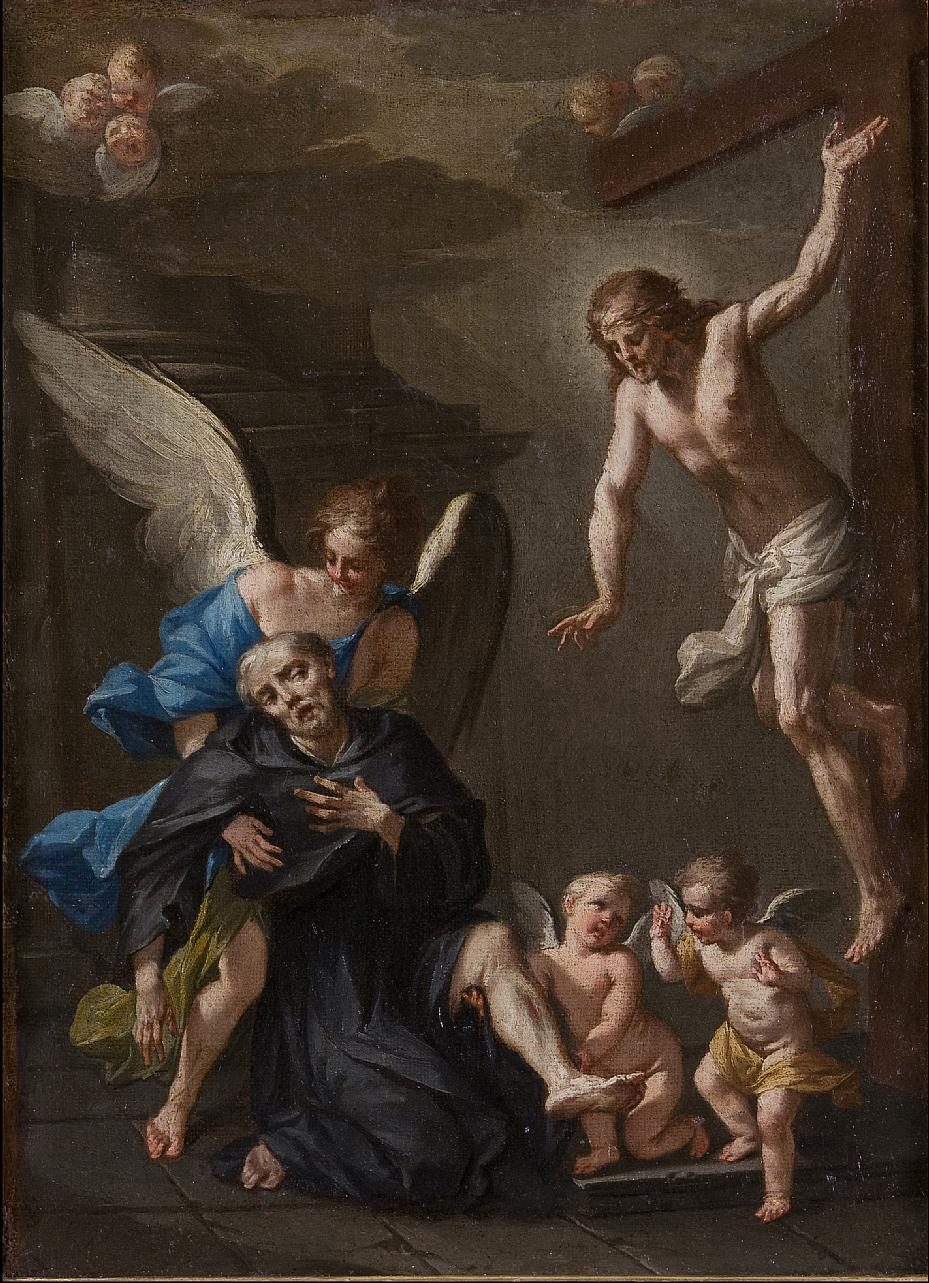
Saint Peregrine by Giacomo Zampa

== See also ==
- List of Catholic saints
