= Archbishop Beck Catholic College =

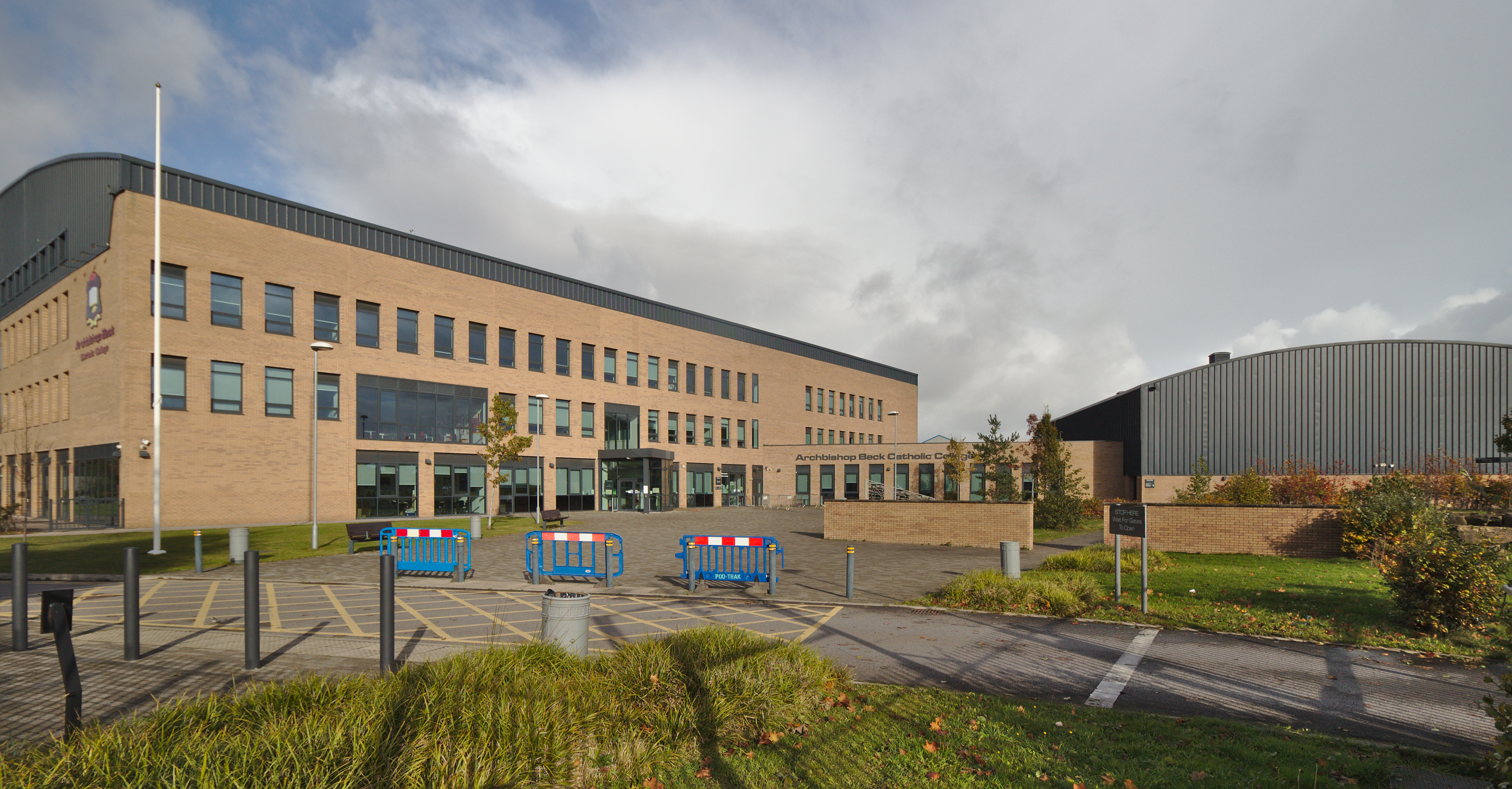
- Archbishop Beck Catholic Sports College

Location
- 55 Long Lane; Walton; Liverpool, Merseyside, L9 7BF; England
- Coordinates: 53.462096°N 2.95054°W

Information
- Type: Voluntary aided school
- Religious affiliation: Roman Catholic
- Local authority: Liverpool City Council
- Department for Education URN: 104717 Tables
- Ofsted: Reports
- Head teacher: Paul Stirling
- Staff: 47
- Gender: Mixed
- Age: 11 to 18
- Capacity: 1,210
- Colour: Maroon
- Website: www.archbishopbeck.com

Archbishop Beck Catholic College (previously known as Archbishop Beck Catholic High School, and as St Bonaventure's, before that) is a mixed Roman Catholic secondary school and sixth form located in the Aintree area of Liverpool, England. The school is named after George Beck who was Archbishop of Liverpool from 1964 to 1976.

It is a voluntary aided school administered by Liverpool City Council and the Roman Catholic Archdiocese of Liverpool. Archbishop Beck Catholic High School gained specialist Sports College status in 2000, and was renamed Archbishop Beck Catholic Sports College. Previously located on Cedar Road, the school moved to a new campus on Long Lane in 2014. After the specialist schools programme ended the school was renamed Archbishop Beck Catholic College.

Archbishop Beck Catholic College offers GCSEs, BTECs and OCR Nationals as programmes of study for pupils. Students in the sixth form have the option to study from a range of A-levels and further BTECs, which are offered as part of the North Liverpool Partnership consortium of school sixth forms.
