= San Filippo Benizi, Todi =

Church building in Todi, Italy

Coordinates: 42.779200°N 12.413808°E

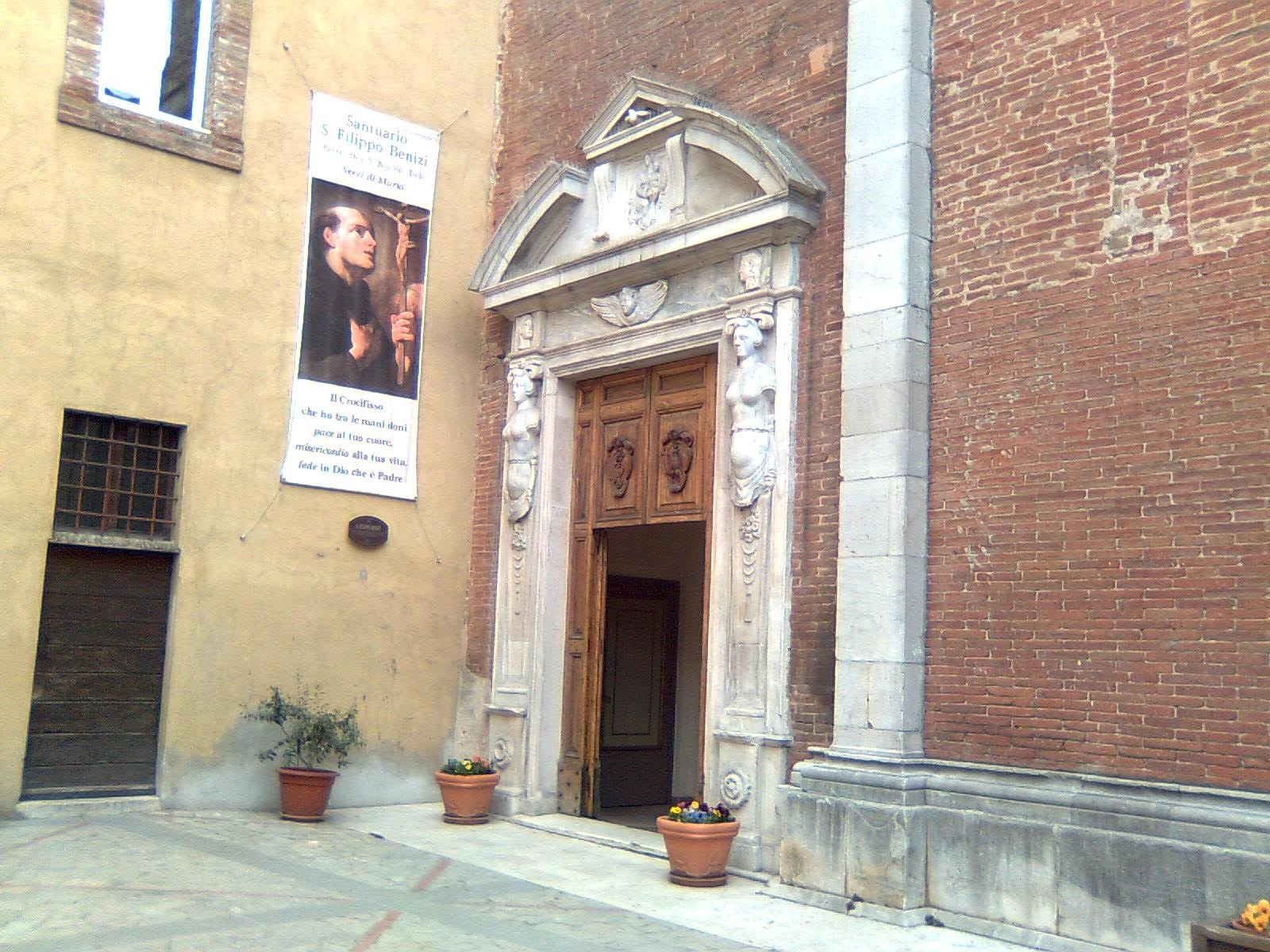

San Filippo Benizzi, formerly Santa Maria delle Grazie is a Roman Catholic sanctuary church and convent on Via Giacomo Matteoti, just inside the Porta Romana and across the Street from San Niccolo, in the center of Todi, province of Perugia, region of Umbria, Italy.

== History ==
In the 15th-century, the Confraternity of San Giovanni and Rocco built a likely round sanctuary or oratory apparently comprising the present apse. In 1660, the church was granted to the Servite order monastery and expanded. The restricted space inside the town walls meant that part of the monastery was built against the facade. The portal awkwardly has two caryatids.

The church is notable for putatively holding the relics of St Filippo Benizi, founder of the Servites, and a large marble baroque sculpture (1673–1675) attributed in the past to Gianlorenzo Bernini, but instead carved by Pietro Paolo Naldini, a sculptor in Bernini's studio. The saint died in Todi in 1285, and with the granting of this church to the Servites, his body was moved here. The altar statue is flanked by pink marble columns. The relics are in a glass sarcophagus that serves as the altar.
