= Bernard Ward (bishop) =

English prelate (1857-1920)

Bernard Nicholas Ward
- Bishop of Brentwood
- Church: Catholic Church
- Diocese: Diocese of Brentwood
- In office: 20 July 1917 – 21 January 1920
- Predecessor: Diocese erected
- Successor: Arthur Doubleday
- Previous posts: Titular Bishop of Lydda (1917); Apostolic Administrator of Brentwood (1917)

Orders
- Ordination: 8 October 1882 by Henry Edward Manning
- Consecration: 10 April 1917 by Francis Bourne

Personal details
- Born: 4 February 1857 Old Hall Green, Hertfordshire, United Kingdom of Great Britain and Ireland
- Died: 21 January 1920 (aged 62)

Styles of Bernard Ward
- Reference style: The Right Reverend
- Spoken style: My Lord
- Religious style: Bishop

Bernard Nicholas Ward (4 February 1857 – 21 January 1920) was an English prelate who served in the Roman Catholic Church as the Bishop of Brentwood from 1917 until his death in 1920. He was "a distinguished educationalist and the foremost historian of English Catholicism of his generation."

== Life ==
Born at Old Hall Green, Hertfordshire on 4 February 1857, he was ordained to the priesthood on 8 October 1882.

In 1917, the Diocese of Brentwood was created from the Archdiocese of Westminster. Ward was appointed the Apostolic Administrator and Titular Bishop of Lydda on 22 March 1917. His consecration to the Episcopate took place on 10 April 1917, the principal consecrator was Cardinal Francis Bourne, Archbishop of Westminster, and the principal co-consecrators were John Francis Vaughan, Auxiliary Bishop of Salford and Joseph Butt, Auxiliary Bishop of Westminster. Three months later, Ward was appointed the first Bishop of the Diocese of Brentwood on 20 July 1917.

Ward was known as something of a railway buff "...when writing to his clergy, the Bishop would always include details of the most convenient train times for reaching a particular event to which he had invited them."

He died in office on 21 January 1920, aged 63, and is buried in the chapel of St Edmund's College, Ware, where he had served as President.

Catholic Church titles
New title	Bishop of Brentwood; 1917–1920	Succeeded by Arthur Doubleday
