= Philip Benizi de Damiani =

General Superior of the Order of the Servites; and Catholic saint

Saint Philip Benizi OSM
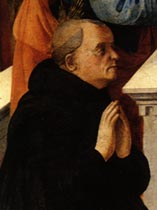

Confessor
- Born: August 15, 1233; Florence, Republic of Florence
- Died: August 22, 1285 (aged 52); Todi, Papal States
- Venerated in: Roman Catholic Church
- Canonized: April 12, 1671, Rome by Pope Clement X
- Major shrine: Church of the Servites of Mary in Todi, Umbria, Italy
- Feast: August 23
- Attributes: Habit of the Servite Order, lily, book, papal tiara
- Patronage: Minor Basilica of Monte Senario (Vaglia) in the Diocese of Florence, Tuscany, Italy; Zamboanga del Norte, Philippines

Philip Benizi, OSM (sometimes Saint Philip Benitius, and in Italian Filippo Benizzi; August 15, 1233 – August 22, 1285) was a general superior of the Servites, and is credited with reviving the order.

== Biography ==
Philip Benizi was born on August 15 in the Florentine district of Oltrarno, of the noble family of Benizi. Of his childhood but little is known. He entered the order of the Servites as a lay brother and was sent to a convent three leagues from Florence, where he displayed the utmost diligence. He would retire into a cavern near the church to meditate. Two Dominicans who chanced to visit him were so struck by his piety that they insisted he become a priest.

When he was elected the general superior on June 5, 1267, the order, which had long been the object of attack from enemies, entered into the crisis of its existence. The Second Council of Lyons in 1274 put into execution the ordinance of the Fourth Lateran Council, forbidding the foundation of new religious orders, and absolutely suppressing all mendicant institutions not yet approved by the Holy See. In 1276 Pope Innocent V, in a letter addressed to Philip, declared the order suppressed. Philip then proceeded to Rome, but before his arrival there, Innocent V had died.

The city of Forlì was part of the Papal States and, in 1283, the site of strong anti-papal sentiment was placed under interdict. Pope Martin IV asked Philip to go to Forlì and try to reconcile the divided city. According to a certain sixteenth century legend regarding Benizi, he encountered an eighteen-year-old Peregrine Laziosi, the son of a Ghibelline leader, who was among those abusive towards Philip. However, Philip's meeting with the initially antagonistic youth inspired Peregrine to later join the Servites. Known for his ascetic devotions, in 1726, Peregrine himself being canonized by Pope Benedict XIII. Other chroniclers of Peregrine do not recount this meeting with Philip .

Philip died on August 22, 1285, during the Octave of the Assumption at Todi, where he is buried in the church of San Filippo Benizi.

The cloister of Santa Maria of the Servites in Vicenza, was the location of his miracles in 1319.

== Veneration ==
The Church of the Servites of Mary in Todi, Umbria, contains the body of Philip Benizi, whose statue is the work of Bernini.

Saint Philip's feast day is celebrated on August 23. He and Santa Maria Addolorata are the titular co-patrons of the minor basilica of Monte Senario (in Vaglia, Metropolitan City of Florence), in the Diocese of Florence (since 1917).

== Churches named after Philip Benizi ==
=== United States ===
There are Catholic churches named for Saint Philip Benizi in: Black Canyon City, Arizona; Fullerton, California; Belle Glade, Florida; Jonesboro, Georgia, Chicago, Illinois; Grafton, Massachusetts; Viburnum, Missouri; Darby, Montana; Creswell; Oregon City, Oregon; Moncks Corner, South Carolina; Poteet, Texas; Ford, Washington; Trapper Creek, Alaska; and Cedaredge, Colorado.

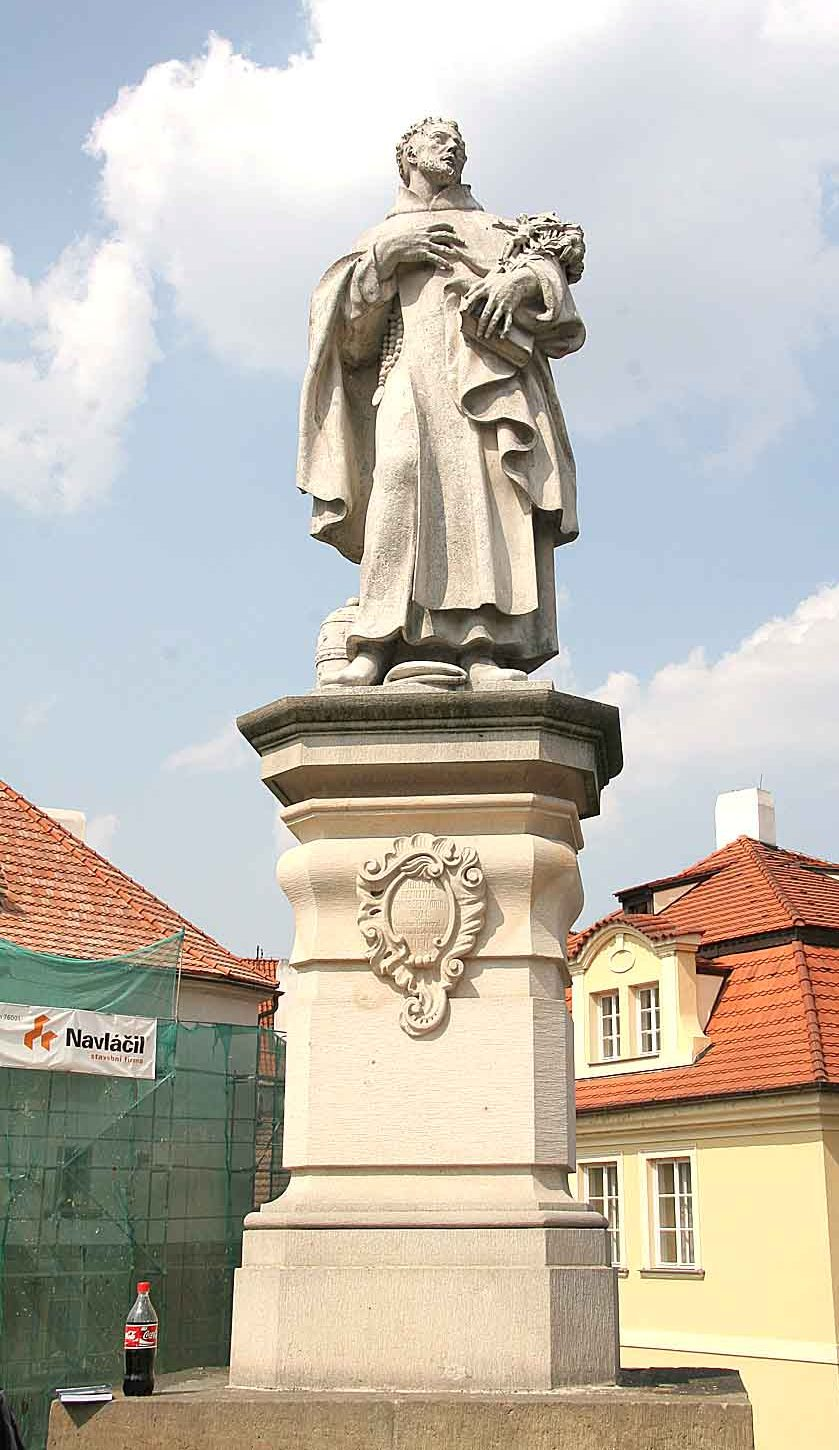
Statue of Philip Benizi on the Charles Bridge, Prague

=== Elsewhere ===
- San Filippo Benizi, Todi
- St. Philip's Priory, Chelmsford, England - a priory of the Premonstratensian Order.
- Our Lady of Sorrows and St. Philip Benizi Catholic Church, Fordingbridge, Hampshire, England.
- Saint Philip Benizi Parish, Sergio Osmeña Sr., Zamboanga del Norte, Philippines (Diocese of Dipolog)

Saint Phillip Benizi Meyerton Catholic Church, South Africa.

== Cultural references ==
Five scenes from his life were painted in the early 16th century by the Florentine Andrea del Sarto: "His Charity to a Leper", "The Smiting of the Blasphemers", "The Cure of the Woman Possessed with a Devil", "The Resurrection of a Child before the bier of the Saint", and "The Veneration of his Relics". These appear in the atrium of the Servite church of the SS. Annunziata, Florence.

There is a statue of him on the Charles Bridge in Prague, Czech Republic. Designed in 1714, this statue was made from Salzburg marble and donated by the Servites convent in Prague. The statue portrays him holding a cross, a book and a spray. By his legs there is the crown of the pope. A clay model of this statue can be found in the Salzburg museum.

There is also a chapel dedicated to him in the church of San Marcello al Corso in Rome, and a statue dedicated to him at The National Sanctuary of our Sorrowful Mother, popularly known as The Grotto, in Portland, Oregon.

In Slovakia, where name days are commonly celebrated, the name day for “Philip” falls on August 23, his feast day.

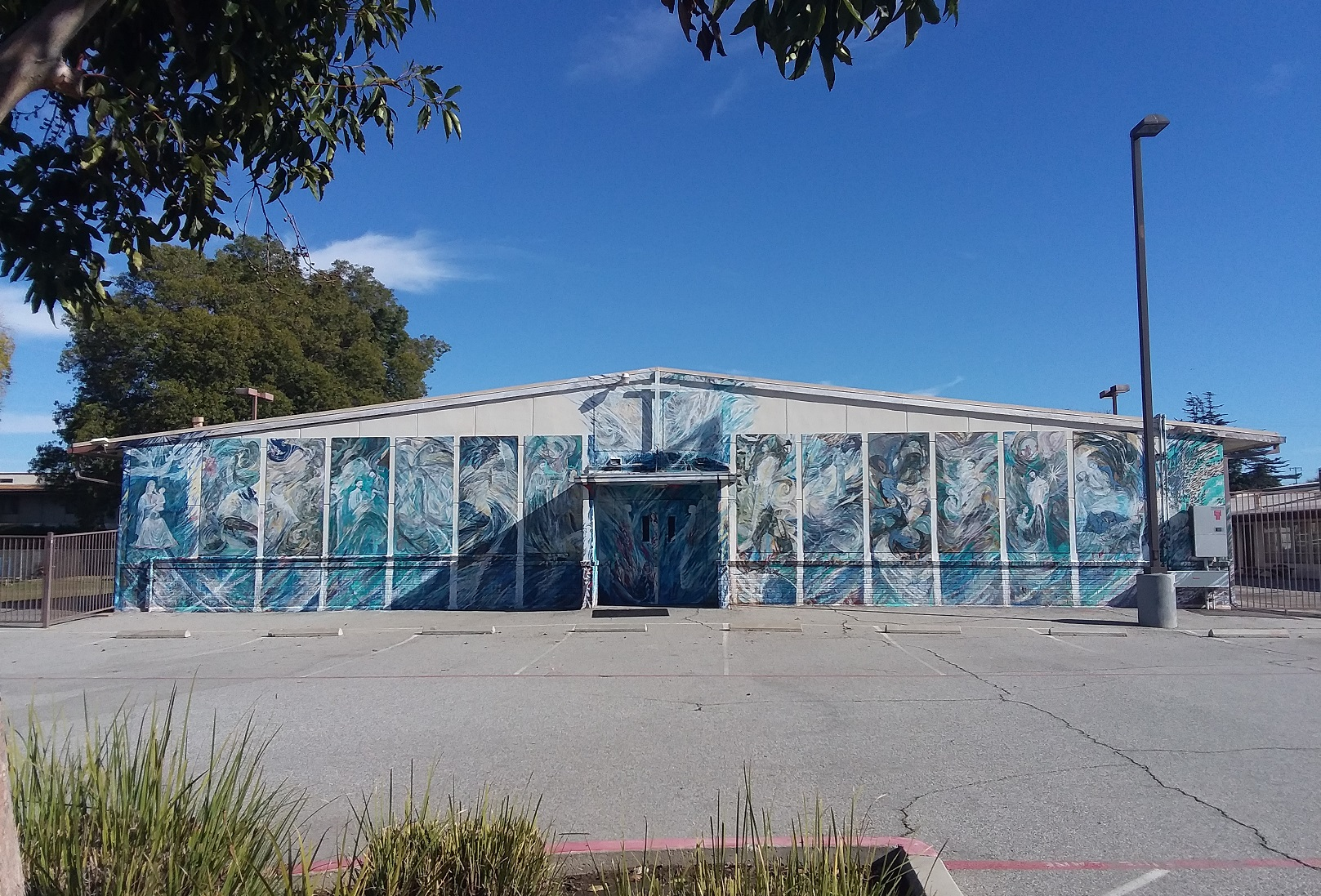
Life of St. Philip Benizi at St. Philip Benizi Parish, Fullerton, CA

== Gallery ==
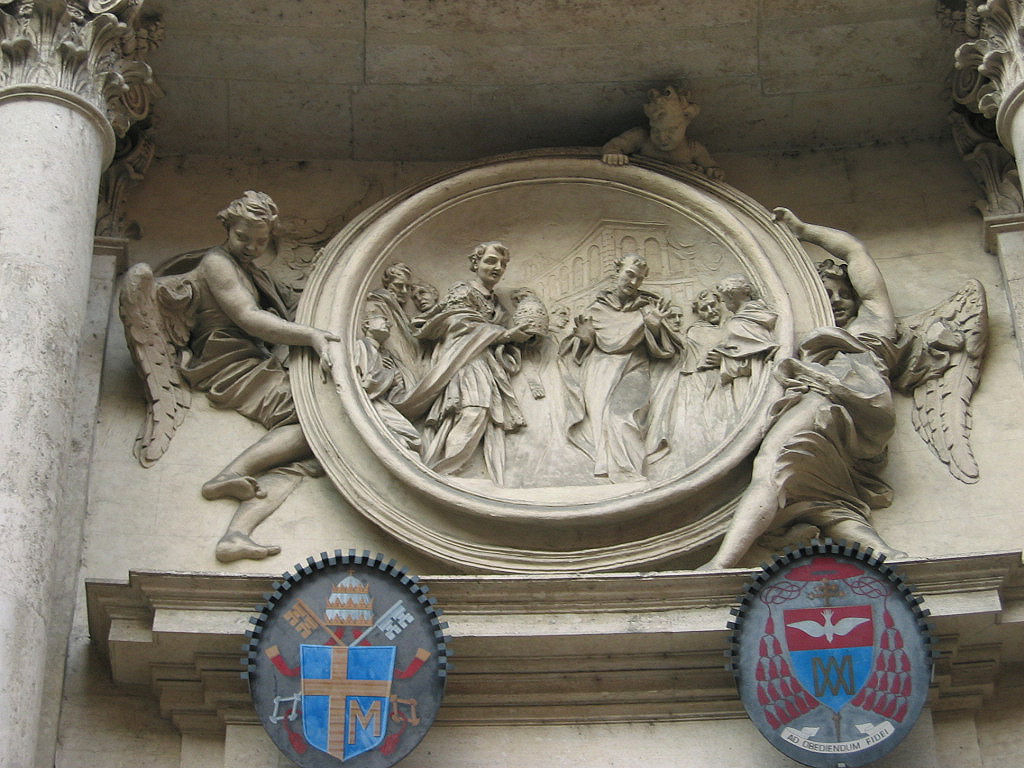
St. Philip Benizi refuses the papal tiara. Church of San Marcello al Corso.

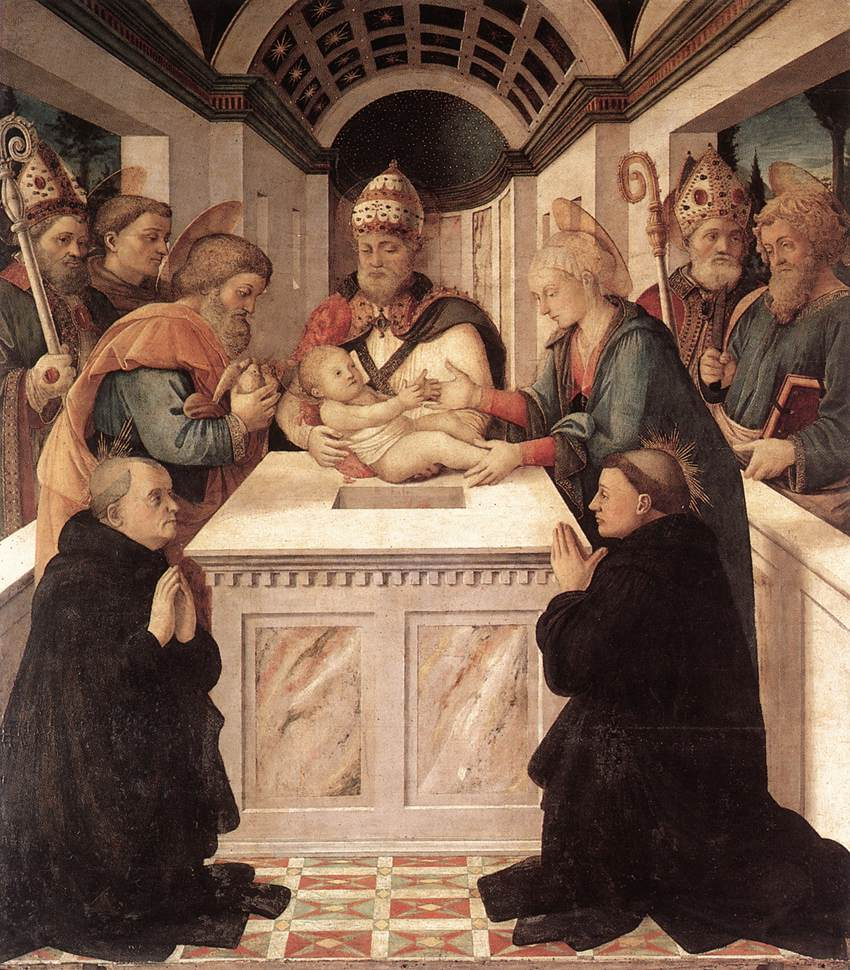
Filippo Lippi, The Presentation in the Temple, with Philip Benizi on the left and Pellegrino Laziosi (Latiosi) on the right

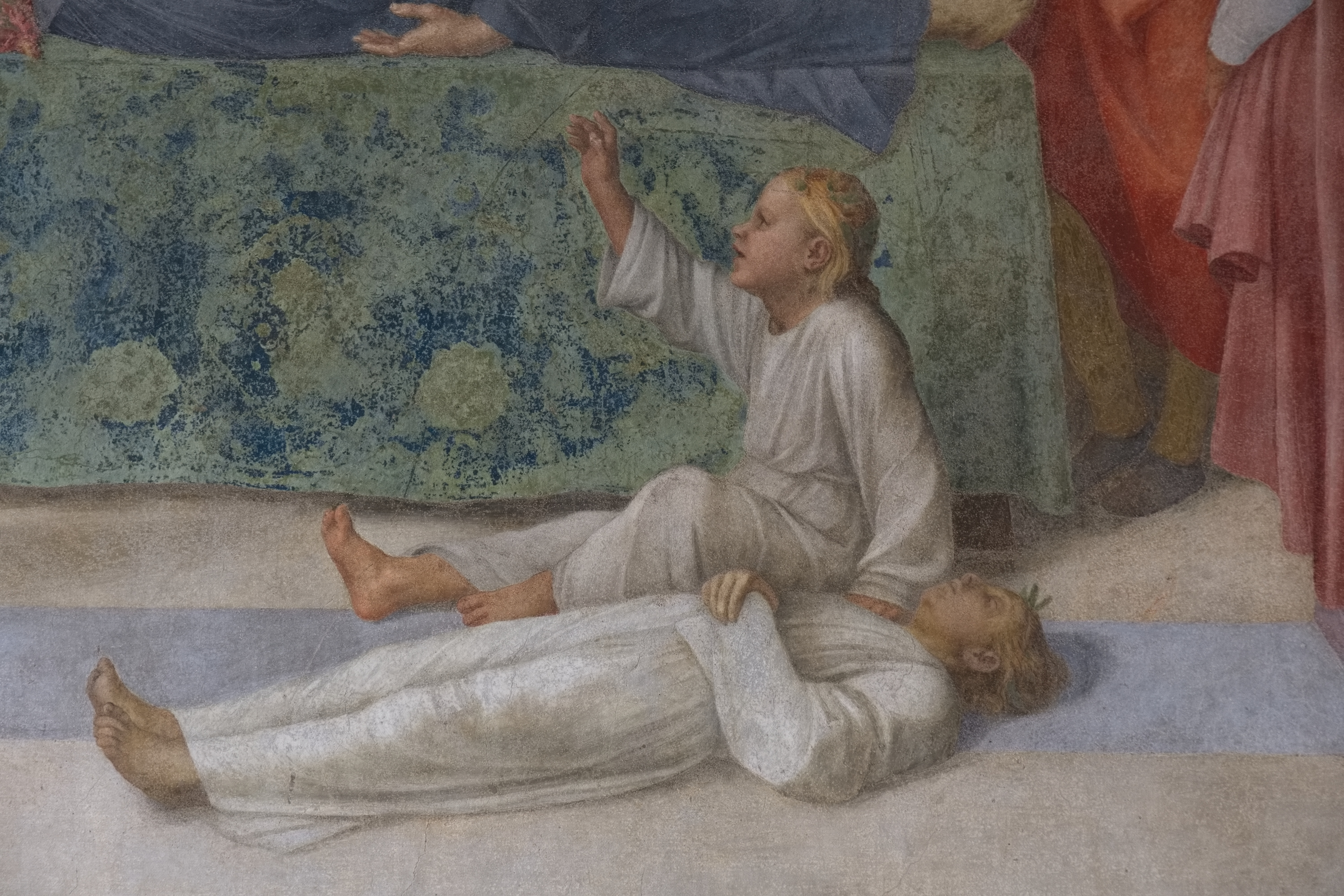
Andrea del Sarto, S Filippo Benizi's Death and Child Restored to Life (detail), 1509f, SS Annunziata, Chiostrino dei Voti, Florence

== Sources and references ==
- "Lives of the Saints, For Every Day of the Year," edited by Rev. Hugo Hoever, S.O., Cist., Ph.D., New York: Catholic Book Publishing Co., 1952, 511 pp
