= Palazzo Naldini =

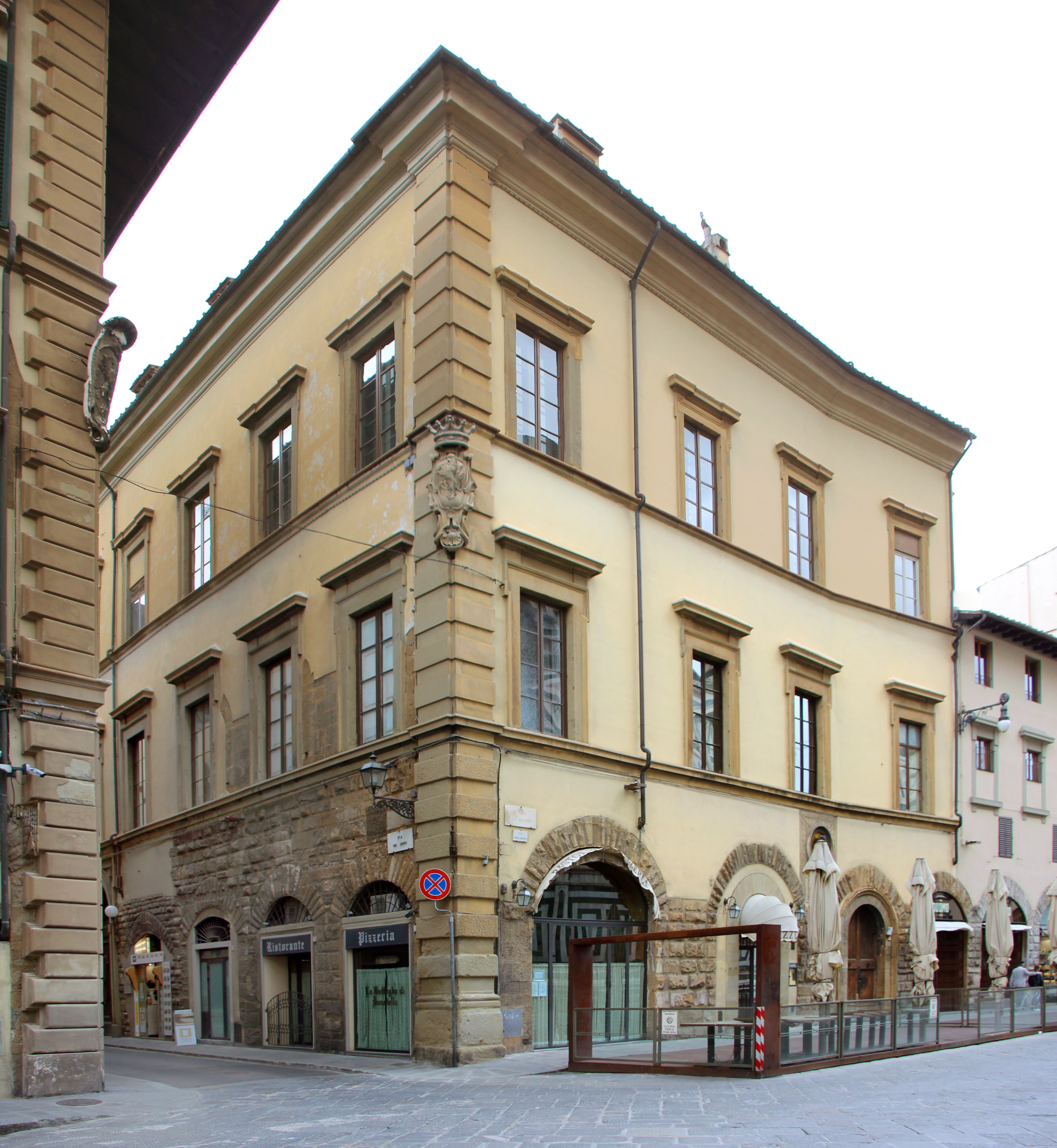
- View of the palace from Piazza del Duomo
- Interactive map of the Palazzo Naldini area
- Alternative names: Palazzo Naldini, Naldini Del Riccio, Niccolini al Duomo

General information
- Status: In use
- Type: Palace
- Architectural style: Mannerist
- Location: Florence, Italy, 28 Piazza del Duomo
- Coordinates: 43.7736°N 11.257558°E
- Construction started: 16th century
- Renovated: 18th century

Design and construction
- Architect: Pietro Paolo Giovannozzi

The Palazzo Naldini, or Naldini Del Riccio', or also Niccolini al Duomo, is a Florence palace on the corner of Piazza del Duomo 28 rosso and Via dei Servi 2–4.

In one of the workshops on the ground floor of the palace worked, among others, Donatello, as recalled by a plaque and a bust towards Piazza Duomo.

== History ==
Two houses owned by the Tedaldi family were here in 1427. "In one of its workshops practised the art of sculpture Donatello and Michelozzo Michelozzi in the year 1433 and in that round. The year then 1498 Giuliano and Antonio Giamberti, known as da San Gallo, celebrated Florentine wood carvers and civil and military architects, leased from Lattanzio di Francesco Tedaldi the workshop of this house, which remains on the south corner".

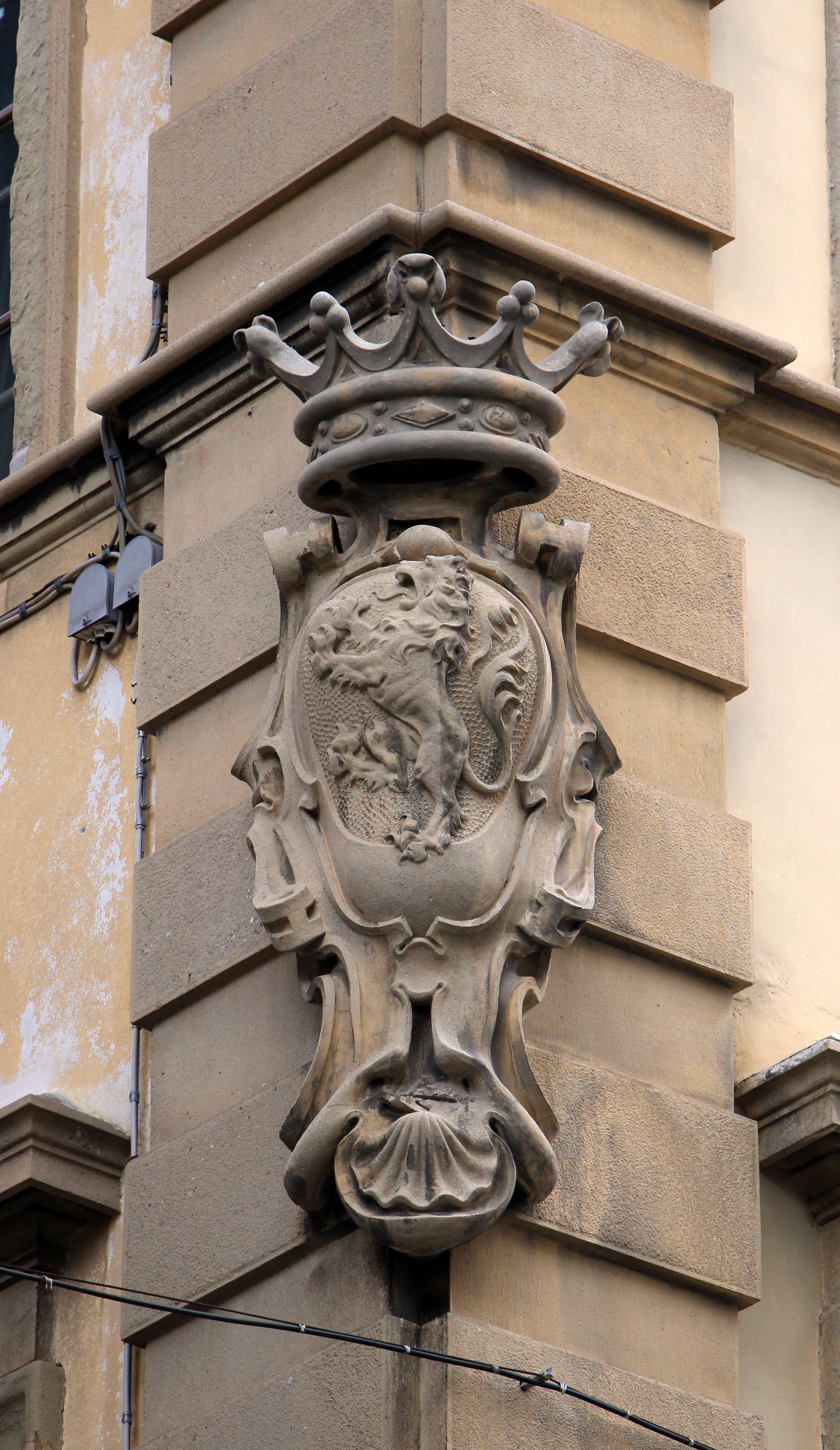
Naldini coat of arms on the cantonment

Towards the middle of the 17th century, when ownership had passed to the Naldini, who had purchased the various portions that were to define the complex from 1532 onwards, construction of today's palace began, based on a design by Pier Francesco Silvani, then completed for Ottaviano Naldini by the architect Pietro Paolo Giovannozzi between 1726 and 1732, who "departed considerably from the primitive design". This initial design by Silvani is also testified to by Ferdinando Ranalli who, however, while attributing to the master "a beautiful staircase and some majestic windows", specifies that "little progress was then made on the said building, which was completed in the year 1726, and considerably enlarged with the assistance and design of the Florentine architect Pier Giovannozzi; who with good taste has completed many things and reduced them to a more modern and noble use".

In the years between 1763 and 1770, at the behest of Domenico Andrea Naldini, the building was further enlarged on Via dei Servi and enriched inside with wall paintings by Gaspero Nannucci, Tommaso Gherardini, Giovanni Domenico Ferretti, Niccolò Pintucci and Gennaro Landi. In the 18th century, Ottaviano Naldini married Maria Caterina del Riccio, a descendant of the humanist Pietro del Riccio, taking the family name of Naldini Del Riccio. The palace then came to the Niccolini of Camugliano in 1879 thanks to the marriage between Cristina Naldini and the marquis and later senator Eugenio Niccolini. The latter was a famous hunter, author of the book Giornate di Caccia (Hunting Days), which was a cornerstone of its genre, and was published with a laudatory preface by Gabriele D'Annunzio: at the time, the palace was enriched with numerous hunting trophies, both skeleton and stuffed animals. Niccolini was also mayor of Prato, but he only accepted the post on condition that he had two free periods per year, related to the passage of caccia and folaghe.

Between 1785 and 1787, under the direction of Giuseppe Salvetti, consolidation work with the laying of chains was carried out on the portion of the palazzo located between the main door and the cantonment of Piazza del Duomo. Major restoration work was carried out on the building in 1911, during which "an interesting and rare pictorial decoration datable to the 15th century" (Piero Roselli) was brought to light in a room of the palazzo, in the wing of Via dei Servi towards the Church of S. Michele.

Part of the property is currently occupied by the Palazzo Niccolini al Duomo residence. The palazzo appears in the list drawn up in 1901 by the General Directorate of Antiquities and Fine Arts, as a monumental building to be considered national artistic heritage.

== Bibliography ==
=== Italian sources ===
- Federico Fantozzi, Nuova guida ovvero descrizione storico artistico critica della città e contorni di Firenze, Firenze, Giuseppe e fratelli Ducci, 1842, p. 368;
- Federico Fantozzi, Pianta geometrica della città di Firenze alla proporzione di 1 a 4500 levata dal vero e corredata di storiche annotazioni, Firenze, Galileiana, 1843, p. 146, nn. 330–331;
- Filippo Baldinucci, Notizie dei professori del disegno da Cimabue in qua, con nuove annotazioni e supplementi per cura di Ferdinando Ranalli, 5 voll., Firenze, V. Batelli e Compagni, 1845–1847, V, 1847, p. 400, in nota;
- Nuova guida della città di Firenze ossia descrizione di tutte le cose che vi si trovano degne d’osservazione, con piante e vedute, ultima edizione compilata da Giuseppe François, Firenze, Vincenzo Bulli, 1850, pp. 247–248;
- Ministero della Pubblica Istruzione (Direzione Generale delle Antichità e Belle Arti), Elenco degli Edifizi Monumentali in Italia, Roma, Tipografia ditta Ludovico Cecchini, 1902, p. 255;
- Walther Limburger, Die Gebäude von Florenz: Architekten, Strassen und Plätze in alphabetischen Verzeichnissen, Lipsia, F.A. Brockhaus, 1910, n. 337;
- Augusto Garneri, Firenze e dintorni: in giro con un artista. Guida ricordo pratica storica critica, Torino et alt., Paravia & C., s.d. ma 1924, p. 35, n. XXV;
- Leonardo Ginori Lisci, I palazzi di Firenze nella storia e nell’arte, Firenze, Giunti & Barbèra, 1972, I, pp. 421–426;
- I Palazzi fiorentini. Quartiere di San Giovanni, introduzione di Piero Bargellini, schede dei palazzi di Marcello Jacorossi, Firenze, Comitato per l’Estetica Cittadina, 1972, pp. 26–27, nn. 33–36;
- Touring Club Italiano, Firenze e dintorni, Milano, Touring Editore, 1974, p. 97;
- Firenze, studi e ricerche sul centro antico, I, L’ampliamento della cattedrale di S. Reparata, le conseguenze sullo sviluppo della città a nord e la formazione della piazza del Duomo e di quella della SS. Annunziata, a cura di Piero Roselli (Istituto di Restauro dei Monumenti, Facoltà di Architettura di Firenze), Pisa, Nistri-Lischi Editori, 1974, p. 64, n. 22;
- Piero Bargellini, Ennio Guarnieri, Le strade di Firenze, 4 voll., Firenze, Bonechi, 1977–1978, I, 1977, p. 324; IV, 1978, pp. 22–23;
- Marcello Vannucci, Splendidi palazzi di Firenze, Le Lettere, Firenze 1995 ISBN 887166230X
- Franco Cesati, Le strade di Firenze. Storia, aneddoti, arte, segreti e curiosità della città più affascinante del mondo attraverso 2400 vie, piazze e canti, 2 voll., Roma, Newton & Compton editori, 2005, I, p. 229;
- Franco Cesati, Le piazze di Firenze. Storia, arte, folclore e personaggi che hanno reso famosi i duecento palcoscenici storici della città più amata nel mondo, Roma, Newton & Compton editori, 2005, p. 87;
- Touring Club Italiano, Firenze e provincia, Milano, Touring Editore, 2005, p. 146;
- Atlante del Barocco in Italia. Toscana / 1. Firenze e il Granducato. Province di Grosseto, Livorno, Pisa, Pistoia, Prato, Siena, a cura di Mario Bevilacqua e Giuseppina Carla Romby, Roma, De Luca Editori d’Arte, 2007, Chiara Martelli, p. 419, n. 123.
