= Statue of Philip Benizi de Damiani, Charles Bridge =

Statue in Prague, Czech Republic

Statue of Philip Benizi de Damiani
- Socha svatého Filipa Benicia (Czech)
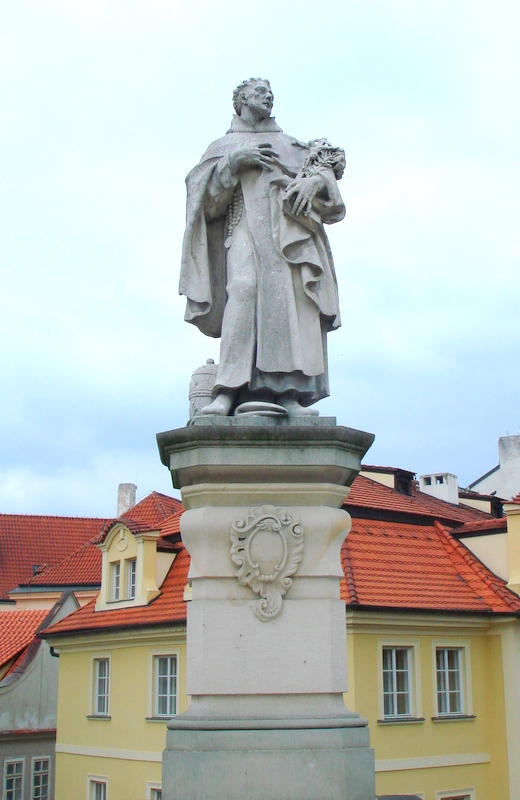
- The statue in 2008
- Artist: Michal Bernard Mandel
- Type: Sculpture
- Subject: Philip Benizi de Damiani
- Location: Prague, Czech Republic; 50°05′13″N 14°24′29″E

The statue of Philip Benizi de Damiani (Czech: Socha svatého Filipa Benicia) is an outdoor sculpture by Michal Bernard Mandel, installed on the north side of the Charles Bridge in Prague, Czech Republic.
