= Pietro Paolo Naldini =

Italian sculptor

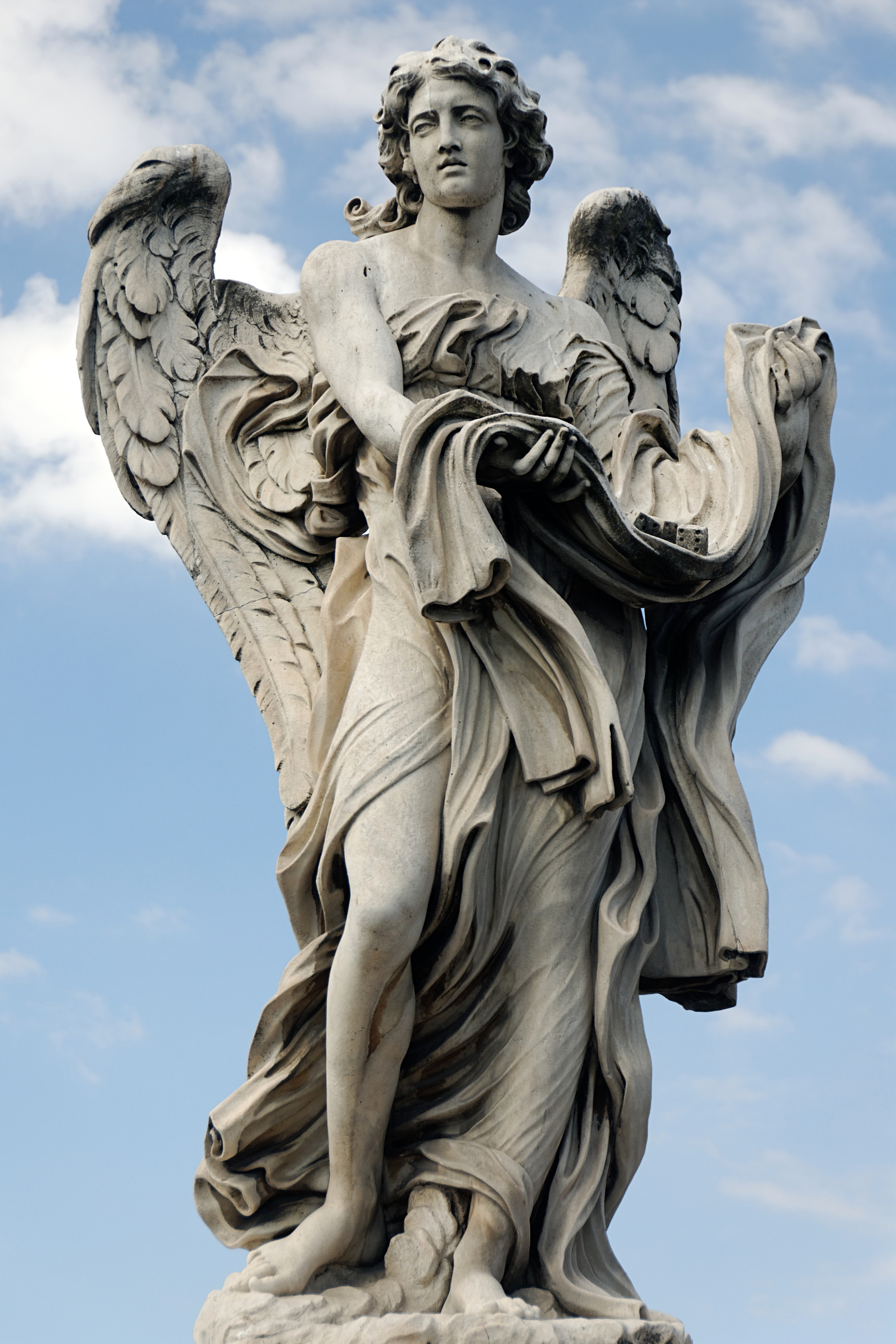
Pietro Paolo Naldini, Angel Bearing Garment and Dice, western side of the Ponte Sant'Angelo in Rome

Pietro Paolo Naldini (1619–1691), also known as Paolo Naldini, was an Italian sculptor.

Naldini specialized in sculpting religious-themed works, primarily angels. He is known to have previously collaborated with Gian Lorenzo Bernini. He also sculpted the statue of the patron saint of San Filippo Benizi, Todi.
