= Patrick Casey (bishop of Brentwood) =

English prelate (1913-1999)

Patrick Joseph Casey
- Bishop of Brentwood
- Church: Catholic Church
- Diocese: Diocese of Brentwood
- In office: 2 December 1969 – 12 December 1979
- Predecessor: Bernard Wall
- Successor: Thomas McMahon
- Previous posts: Titular Bishop of Sufar (1965-1969); Auxiliary Bishop of Westminster (1965-1969)

Orders
- Ordination: 3 June 1939 by Arthur Hinsley
- Consecration: 2 February 1966 by John Heenan

Personal details
- Born: 20 November 1913 Stoke Newington, London, United Kingdom of Great Britain and Ireland
- Died: 26 January 1999 (aged 85)

Styles of Patrick Casey
- Reference style: The Right Reverend
- Spoken style: My Lord
- Religious style: Bishop

Patrick Joseph Casey (20 November 1913 – 26 January 1999) was an English prelate of the Roman Catholic Church. He served as Bishop of Brentwood from 1969 to 1979.

Casey was born in London on 20 November 1913, he was ordained to the priesthood on 3 June 1939. He was appointed an auxiliary bishop of the Archdiocese of Westminster and Titular Bishop of Sufar on 23 December 1965. His consecration to the Episcopate took place on 2 February 1966, the principal consecrator was Cardinal John Carmel Heenan, Archbishop of Westminster, and the principal co-consecrators were Bishop David Cashman of Arundel and Brighton and Archbishop Derek Worlock of Liverpool. Three years later, Casey was appointed the Bishop of the Diocese of Brentwood on 2 December 1969.

He resigned on 12 December 1979 and assumed the title Bishop Emeritus of Brentwood. He died on 26 January 1999, aged 85.

Catholic Church titles
| Preceded by Bernard Patrick Wall | Bishop of Brentwood; 1969–1979 | Succeeded by Thomas McMahon |
