= Alan Williams (bishop) =

English Roman Catholic prelate

The Right Reverend Alan Stephen Williams SM
- Bishop Emeritus of Brentwood
- Church: Roman Catholic Church
- Province: Westminster
- Diocese: Brentwood
- Appointed: 14 April 2014
- Installed: 1 July 2014
- Term ended: 10 October 2026
- Predecessor: Thomas McMahon
- Successor: Timothy Menezes

Orders
- Ordination: 30 April 1983 by George Basil Cardinal Hume
- Consecration: 1 July 2014 by Vincent Cardinal Nichols

Personal details
- Born: 15 March 1951 (age 75) Lancashire, England
- Denomination: Roman Catholic
- Motto: sub tuum præsidium
- Coat of arms

Alan Stephen Williams, SM (born 15 March 1951) is an English Roman Catholic prelate who served as the 7th Bishop of Brentwood from 2014 until his retirement in 2026. He is a member of the Marist Order.

== Career ==
Born in Lancashire in 1951, Alan Williams trained for the priesthood at Allen Hall before which he obtained a Degree in Psychology from Durham University, followed by a PhD in Psychology from London University. He later earned a degree in Theology from the University of Cambridge, and a master's degree in Education from Hull University.

He made his final vows with Society of Mary (Marists) in 1981 and was ordained priest on 30 April 1983 at St Anne’s, Whitechapel. Williams served as a school teacher and as Catholic chaplain to Sheffield Hallam University. He was subsequently parish priest at St Lawrence of Canterbury, Sidcup. He is a former major Superior of the Marist Fathers in England, a post he held from 2000 to 2008. He has also taught Christian Spirituality at postgraduate level. Williams was appointed Director of the Roman Catholic National Shrine at Walsingham in 2008, where he had overall responsibility for pilgrimage and retreat work. He was appointed the seventh Bishop of Brentwood 14 April 2014 and consecrated on 1 July 2014 by Cardinal Vincent Nichols.

In 2023, in conjunction with the Margaret Beaufort Institute of Theology, Williams invited Roman Catholics who no longer regularly attended church services to get in touch so that he could listen to their perspectives. The results of his enquiry, researched by Fr Liam Hayes of the Margaret Beaufort Institute, were published in March 2024 under the title "Bishop Alan Listens".

In 2026, Pope Leo XIV accepted his resignation as Bishop of Brentwood upon reaching the mandatory age of resignation of 75 and named Timothy Francis Menezes, then Auxiliary Bishop for the Archdiocese of Birmingham as his successor

== Coat of arms ==
Coat of arms of Alan Williams
Adopted 2014 Coronet Galero of a Bishop Escutcheon Impaled; Dexter, Azure a cross flory above the three suns Or, each charged with an annulet Gules (Diocese of Brentwood). Sinister Argent three lilies Gules seeded and slipper Or, on a chief Azure a star of seven points of the third (Williams). Compartment Cross in pale Motto Sub Tuum Praesidium ('Under Thy Protection') Symbolism The personal arms which a diocesan bishop adopts are impaled with the arms of the diocese, with the shield of the diocese on the left side (heraldic ‘dexter’) and his own arms on the right (or ‘sinister’) side which shows that he is the holder of the see. The pontifical cross behind the shield is based upon the shape of the Metropolitan Cross of Westminster from which the Diocese of Brentwood was formed. The green hat refers to that of a bishop, the number of tassels showing his rank. In the Bishop’s personal arms, the colours of the shield are based upon the arms of the Society of Mary, the Marists, (a blue chief with a gold star, over a white field bearing a Marian monogram). The three lilies are taken from both the arms of the Diocese of Lancaster, where Bishop Williams was born, and the arms of the ancient priory of Walsingham, where he was Rector. They are red to refer to the red rose of Lancaster (present in both the arms of Oldham and of the Diocese of Lancaster) and this also alluding to the Blood of the Martyrs. The three lilies are Trinitarian in number and also represent the three Diocese in which the Bishop has served as a priest and now bishop. These are impaled with the diocesan arms. The arms of the Diocese bear the cross from the shield of Saint Edward the Confessor, whose miracle of the ring and the beggar took place in Romford within the diocese and beneath this the three suns of Saint Edmund, from the arms of Saint Edmund’s College, Ware, as Bishop Bernard Ward, the first bishop of the Diocese, was born at Old Hall Green where the college stands. These suns are charged with three rings, referring to a mystical dream St Edmund received when a teacher of geometry, as a means of explaining the Holy Trinity. The Motto "Sub Tuum Praesidium" (meaning "Under Thy Protection", which comes from an ancient hymn to Our Blessed Lady) alludes to the Marist motto Sub Tuum Nomine and combines the Bishop’s own Marian devotion with that of St Edward the Confessor.

Catholic Church titles
Preceded by Thomas McMahon	Bishop of Brentwood; 2014–	Succeeded by
