= Thomas McMahon (bishop) =

English Roman Catholic bishop (1936–2025)

The Right Reverend Thomas McMahon
- Bishop Emeritus of Brentwood
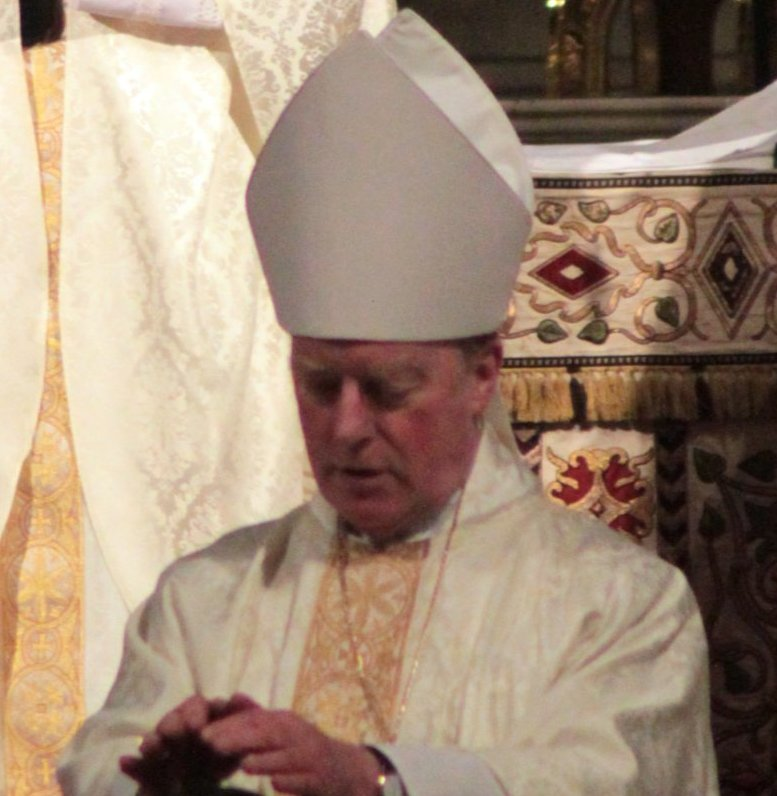
- Bishop McMahon in 2011
- Province: Westminster
- Diocese: Brentwood
- Appointed: 16 June 1980
- Installed: 17 July 1980
- Term ended: 14 April 2014
- Predecessor: Patrick Joseph Casey
- Successor: Alan Williams

Orders
- Ordination: 29 November 1959 by Bernard Wall
- Consecration: 17 July 1980 by Basil Hume, Patrick Casey and Geoffrey Burke

Personal details
- Born: 17 June 1936 Dorking, Surrey, England
- Died: 24 November 2025 (aged 89) Stock, Essex, England
- Denomination: Roman Catholic
- Motto: Be Doers of the Word

Thomas McMahon (17 June 1936 – 24 November 2025) was an English Roman Catholic bishop. From 1980 to 2014, he was the Bishop of Brentwood.

== Background ==
McMahon grew up in Harlow and attended St. Bede's Grammar School, Manchester, before training for the priesthood at St. Sulpice, Paris. He was ordained on 28 November 1959 at the seminary in Wonersh.

He was appointed an assistant priest in Colchester, where he served for five years. From 1964 to 1969 he was appointed to Westcliff-on-Sea, and then became parish priest of Stock. From 1972 to 1980 he served as Chaplain to Essex University. He was a member of the National Ecumenical Commission.

On 16 June 1980, Pope John Paul II appointed Fr McMahon as the Bishop of Brentwood. On 17 July 1980, Cardinal Basil Hume consecrated him as a bishop. He was a member of I.C.E.L. (representing the Bishops of England and Wales on the Episcopal Board) from 1983. He was Chairman of the Bishops' Pastoral Liturgy Committee from 1983 to 1997, and was Chairman of the Bishops' Church Music Committee from 1985.

McMahon died at his home in Stock, on 24 November 2025, at the age of 89.

== Work in the diocese ==
McMahon was Chairman of the Brentwood Diocesan Ecumenical Commission in 1979. Brentwood is the only Catholic diocese in the country with boundaries that are co-terminous to the corresponding Anglican Diocese (the Diocese of Chelmsford) and there was very close co-operation on both a personal and pastoral level between the two bishops. They met every month in the early morning for an hour's prayer, followed by a working breakfast. They undertook many joint engagements in their dioceses.

Brentwood has five ecumenical parishes where there is shared ownership of the church between the denominations; two shared primary schools and there is also a joint pilgrimage each year to the Chapel of St Peter-on-the-Wall, Bradwell. McMahon was Chairman of the Essex Church Leaders Consultative Council from 1984 to 1993, and he was a member of the Barking Church Leaders Group and the London Church Leaders Group.

McMahon was patron of a number of groups and organisations, notably vice-president of Pax Christi since 1987. He was a founder member of the Movement for Christian Democracy and together with Lord Alton visited refugee camps and homes in Albania in September 1999.

McMahon took special interest in all areas of pastoral work. He was involved with various developments in the diocese, including the establishment of the Justice and Peace Commission; Social Welfare Commission; Youth Commission and the Diocesan Pastoral Centre at New Hall and the Diocesan House of Prayer at Brentwood.

There were also various programmes in the diocese, such as the Diocesan Renewal Programme, the Movement for a Better World (1982); the Ministry to Priests Programme (1984); and a ten-year pastoral plan for the diocese leading up to the year 2000.

He was responsible for the building of the diocesan offices "Cathedral House" in Brentwood (1982), followed by the building of a new Cathedral in 1989 by the classical architect, Quinlan Terry. It is the first cathedral to be built in the classical style since St. Paul's. McMahon also founded a Cathedral and Choral Trust and extended the Choir School (2000).

Following his consecration as Bishop of Brentwood in 1980, the Catholic population of the diocese increased steadily, while the number of priests remained approximately stable, leading to a decline in the ratio of priests to people comparable with that occurring elsewhere in the Western world over the same period. As of December 2018, there were nine students in training for the priesthood.

In March 2015, it was heard at Southwark Crown Court that McMahon was one of two bishops responsible for allowing Anthony McSweeney to be appointed a priest in the Roman Catholic Diocese of East Anglia following an incident in 1998 in which "the housekeeper at [McSweeney's] parish in Essex found what she said was a video containing paedophile images". The matter was heard by McMahon, and explained to Bishop Peter Smith, and was decided upon as an incident for clergy discipline and not investigated by the police. McSweeney was allowed to continue practising as a priest and governor at a local high school. Anthony McSweeney was later jailed for abusing boys at the Grafton House children's home between 1978 and 1981.

== Recognition ==
McMahon's wide involvement in the life of the county of Essex was recognised when in 1991 he was awarded an honorary doctorate of the University of Essex and in 1992 elected President of the Essex Show. He was a member of the Court of both the University of Essex and the North East London University.

His personal hobbies and interests included music, reading, art, architecture, tennis and walking. Mayhew McCrimmon have published two of his books: The Mass Explained and Altar Servers' Handbook.

== Retirement ==
McMahon tendered his resignation as Bishop of Brentwood on reaching the age of 75 in June 2011 and celebrated a farewell Mass in December 2012, and remained in the post until 2014, when Alan Williams was announced as the new Bishop of Brentwood.

== Bibliography ==
- McMahon, Thomas (1977). The Mass Explained (Second ed.). Great Wakering, Essex, UK: McCrimmon Publishing Co Ltd. p. 103. ISBN 978-0-85597-201-1.
- Hawkins, Peter; McMahon, Thomas (1978). Altar Servers Manual. Series 3 Holy Communion Service. Great Wakering, Essex, UK: McGrimmon Publishing Co Ltd. p. 56. ISBN 978-0-85597-223-3.

Catholic Church titles
Preceded by Patrick Joseph Casey	Bishop of Brentwood; 1980–2014	Succeeded by Alan Williams SM
