= Bishop of Brentwood =

Catholic ecclesial title in England

Coordinates: 51°37′N 0°18′E

- Bishopric

catholic
- Incumbent: Alan Williams

Location
- Ecclesiastical province: Westminster

Information
- First holder: Bernard Nicholas Ward
- Established: 20 July 1917
- Diocese: Brentwood
- Cathedral: St Mary's and St Helen's, Brentwood

The Bishop of Brentwood is the Ordinary of the Roman Catholic Diocese of Brentwood in the Province of Westminster, England.

== Overview ==
The diocese covers the historic county of Essex, an area of 3,959 km^{2} (1,500 sq mi) comprising the non-metropolitan county of Essex, the unitary authorities of Southend-on-Sea and Thurrock, and from Greater London, the London Boroughs of Barking & Dagenham, Havering, Newham, Redbridge and Waltham Forest, matching Essex's historic boundaries and the Anglican Diocese of Chelmsford. The see is in the town of Brentwood where the bishop's seat is located at the Cathedral Church of Saint Mary and Saint Helen.

== History ==
The diocese was erected on 20 July 1917 from the Archdiocese of Westminster. The current bishop is the Right Reverend Alan Williams, the 7th Bishop of Brentwood. He is a member of the Society of Mary and director of the Shrine of Our Lady of Walsingham.

== List of the Bishops of the Roman Catholic Diocese of Brentwood, England ==
Bishops of Brentwood
From	Until	Incumbent	Notes
1917	1920	Bernard Nicholas Ward	Appointed Apostolic Administrator of Brentwood on 22 March 1917 and consecrated on 10 April 1917. Appointed Bishop of Brentwood on 20 July 1917. Died in office on 21 January 1920.
1920	1951	Arthur Doubleday	Appointed bishop on 7 May 1920 and consecrated on 23 June 1920. Died in office on 23 January 1951.
1951	1955	George Andrew Beck, A.A.	Appointed Coadjutor Bishop of Brentwood on 7 August 1948 and consecrated on 21 September 1948. Succeeded Bishop of Brentwood on 23 January 1951. Translated to Salford on 28 November 1955.
1955	1969	Bernard Patrick Wall	Appointed bishop on 30 November 1955 and consecrated on 18 January 1956. Retired on 14 April 1969 and appointed Titular Bishop of Othona. Died on 18 June 1976.
1969	1979	Patrick Joseph Casey	Formerly an Auxiliary Bishop of Westminster (1965–1969). Appointed Bishop of Brentwood on 2 December 1969. Resigned on 12 December 1979 and died on 26 January 1999.
1980	2014	Thomas McMahon	Appointed bishop on 16 June 1980 and consecrated on 17 July 1980. Announced his retirement in 2011.
2014	present	Alan Williams	Appointed 14 April 2014, took office 1 July 2014.
