= Arthur Doubleday =

South African-born prelate (1865-1951)

- Bishop of Brentwood
- Church: Catholic Church
- Diocese: Diocese of Brentwood
- In office: 7 May 1920 – 23 January 1951
- Predecessor: Bernard Ward
- Successor: George Beck

Orders
- Ordination: 22 December 1888
- Consecration: 23 June 1920 by Francis Bourne

Personal details
- Born: 16 October 1865 Pietermaritzburg, Colony of Natal, British Empire
- Died: 23 January 1951 (aged 85)

Styles of Arthur Doubleday
- Reference style: The Right Reverend
- Spoken style: My Lord
- Religious style: Bishop

Arthur Doubleday (16 October 1865 – 23 January 1951) was a South African-born prelate who served in the Roman Catholic Church as the second Bishop of Brentwood from 1920 to 1951.

Born in Pietermaritzburg, South Africa on 16 October 1865, he was ordained a priest for the Diocese of Southwark on 22 December 1888. He was appointed the Bishop of the Diocese of Brentwood by the Holy See on 7 May 1920. His consecration to the Episcopate took place on 23 June 1920, the principal consecrator was Cardinal Francis Bourne, Archbishop of Westminster, and the principal co-consecrators were Bishop Peter Amigo of Southwark and Bishop William Cotter of Portsmouth.

Bishop Doubleday died in office on 23 January 1951, aged 85.

Catholic Church titles
Preceded by Bernard Ward	Bishop of Brentwood; 1920–1951	Succeeded by George Beck
