= Bernard Wall =

English prelate

Bernard Patrick Wall
- Bishop of Brentwood
- Church: Catholic Church
- Diocese: Diocese of Brentwood
- In office: 30 November 1955 – 14 April 1969
- Predecessor: George Beck
- Successor: Patrick Casey
- Other post: Titular Bishop of Othona (1969-1976)

Orders
- Ordination: 14 July 1918 by Peter Amigo
- Consecration: 18 January 1956 by Cyril Cowderoy

Personal details
- Born: 15 March 1894 Tonbridge, Kent, United Kingdom of Great Britain and Ireland
- Died: 18 June 1976 (aged 82) Guildford, Surrey, United Kingdom of Great Britain and Northern Ireland

Styles of Bernard Wall
- Reference style: The Right Reverend
- Spoken style: My Lord
- Religious style: Bishop

Bernard Patrick Wall (15 March 1894 – 18 June 1976) was an English prelate who served in the Roman Catholic Church as the Bishop of Brentwood from 1955 to 1969.

Born in Tonbridge, Kent on 15 March 1894, he was ordained to the priesthood on 14 July 1918. He was appointed the Bishop of the Diocese of Brentwood by the Holy See on 30 November 1955. His consecration to the Episcopate took place on 18 January 1956, the principal consecrator was Cyril Conrad Cowderoy, Bishop (later Archbishop) of Southwark, and the principal co-consecrators were Neil Farren, Bishop of Derry and George Andrew Beck, Bishop of Salford (later Archbishop of Liverpool). Bishop Wall participated in all the four sessions of the Second Vatican Council, held between in 1962 and 1965.

He retired on 14 April 1969 and assumed the title Bishop Emeritus of Brentwood. He died on 18 June 1976, aged 82.

Catholic Church titles
Preceded by George Andrew Beck	Bishop of Brentwood; 1955–1969	Succeeded by Patrick Joseph Casey
