= George Beck (bishop) =

Catholic Archbishop of Liverpool (1904–1978)

The Most Reverend George Beck AA
- Archbishop of Liverpool
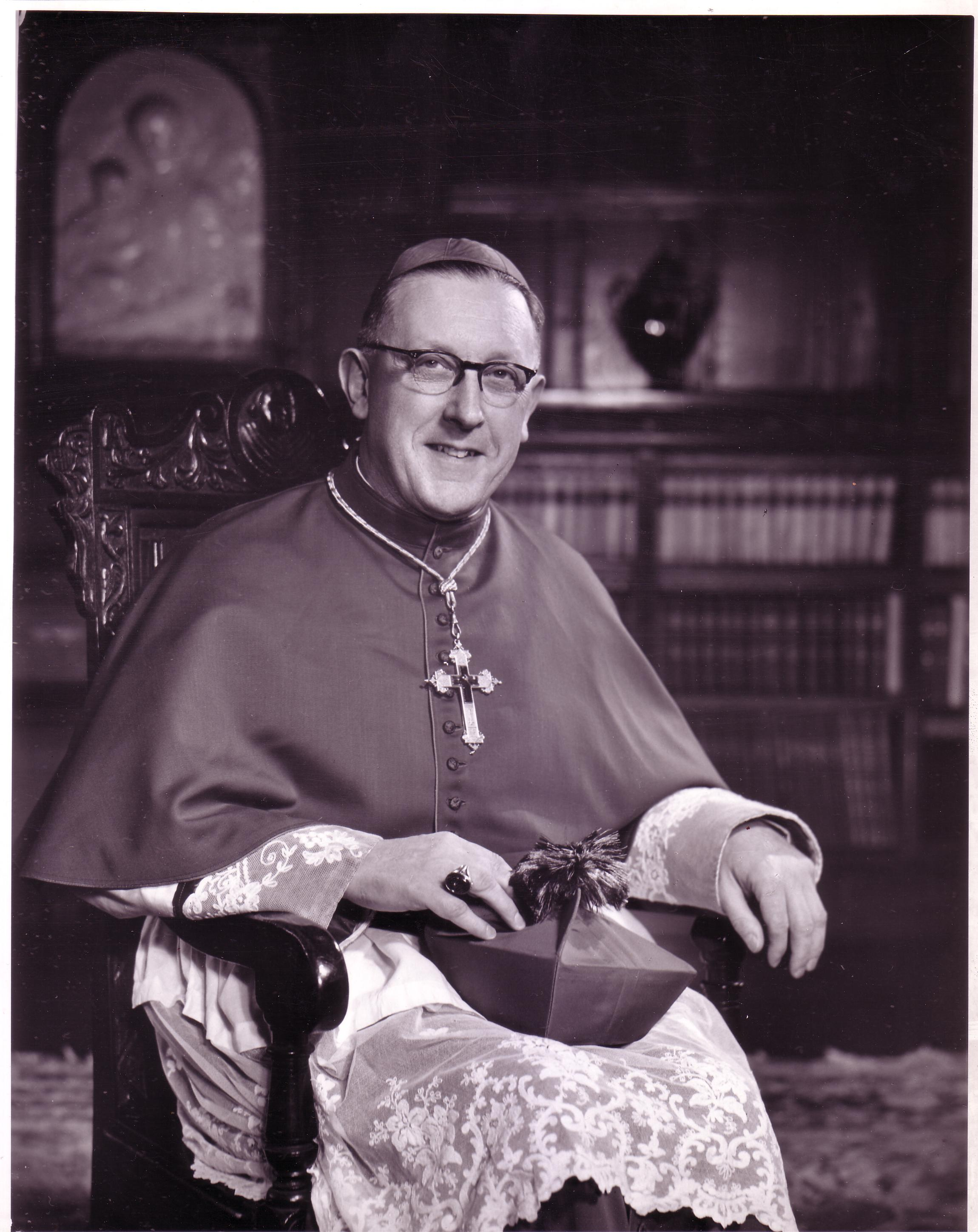
- Church: Roman Catholic
- Diocese: Liverpool
- Appointed: 29 January 1964
- Term ended: 7 February 1976
- Predecessor: John Carmel Heenan
- Successor: Derek Worlock
- Previous posts: Bishop of Salford (1955–64); Bishop of Brentwood (1951–55); Coadjutor Bishop of Brentwood and Titular Bishop of Tigias (1948–51)

Orders
- Ordination: 24 July 1927
- Consecration: 21 September 1948 by Bernard Griffin

Personal details
- Born: 28 May 1904 Streatham, London, England
- Died: 13 September 1978 (aged 74) Liverpool, England
- Education: Clapham College

Styles of George Beck
- Reference style: The Most Reverend
- Spoken style: Your Grace
- Religious style: Archbishop

George Andrew Beck (28 May 1904 – 13 September 1978) was an English prelate who served in the Roman Catholic Church as Archbishop of Liverpool from 29 January 1964 to 7 February 1976.

== Life ==
Beck was born in Streatham in south London. He was educated at Clapham College and later at the Assumptionist College of St Michael at Hitchin in Hertfordshire. In 1927, he was ordained priest in the order of the Assumptionists (or Augustinians of the Assumption). He was headmaster of the Becket School in Nottingham and in 1948, he was appointed coadjutor Bishop of Brentwood and titular bishop of Tigias. He succeeded as Bishop of Brentwood in 1951 was subsequently Bishop of Salford from 1955 to 1964. As Bishop of Salford he continued the substantial expansion of new parishes and schools begun by his predecessor, Henry Vincent Marshall, to implement the Education Act. Beck was an educational expert, and successfully led negotiations with successive governments to better the position of Catholic schools across the country. He attended all four sessions of the Second Vatican Council from 1962 until 1965. In 1964 he was appointed Archbishop of Liverpool, from which he resigned at the age of 71 in 1976.

Archbishop Beck Catholic Sports College in the Walton area of Liverpool is named after him.

Catholic Church titles
Preceded by Arthur Doubleday	Bishop of Brentwood; 1951—1955	Succeeded by Bernard Patrick Wall
Preceded by Henry Vincent Marshall	Bishop of Salford; 1955—1964	Succeeded by Thomas Holland
Preceded by John Carmel Heenan	Archbishop of Liverpool; 1964—1976	Succeeded by Derek John Worlock
