= Diocese of Brentwood =

Catholic diocese in England

Coordinates: 51°37′10″N 0°18′23″E

Diocese of Brentwood Dioecesis Brentvoodensis

Catholic
- Coat of arms

Location
- Country: England
- Territory: Essex
- Ecclesiastical province: Westminster
- Metropolitan: Archdiocese of Westminster
- Deaneries: 12

Statistics
- Area: 3,967 km^{2} (1,532 sq mi)
- Population: Total; Catholics: (as of 2012); 2,789,000; 225,700 (8.1%)
- Parishes: 82

Information
- Denomination: Roman Catholic
- Rite: Latin Rite
- Established: 20 July 1917
- Cathedral: Brentwood Cathedral
- Secular priests: 115

Current leadership
- Pope: Leo XIV
- Bishop-Elect: Timothy Menezes
- Metropolitan Archbishop: Richard Moth
- Vicar General: Kevin Hale
- Bishops emeritus: Alan Williams

Map
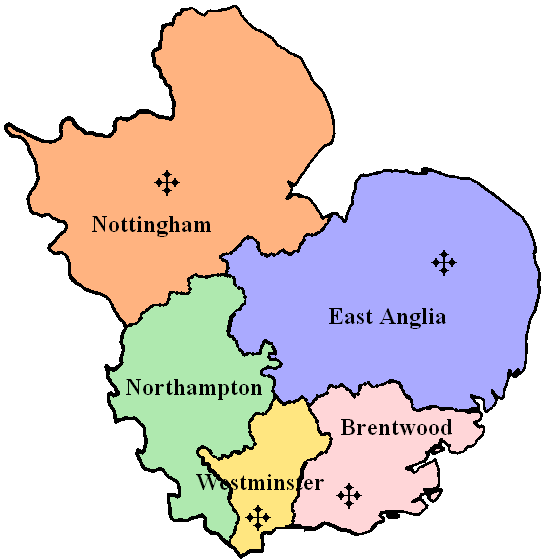
- The Diocese of Brentwood within the Province of Westminster

Website
- Diocese of Brentwood

The Diocese of Brentwood (Latin: Dioecesis Brentvoodensis) is a Latin Church diocese of the Catholic church in England. The diocese is a suffragan of the Catholic Archdiocese of Westminster, and covers the historic county of Essex.

== Overview ==
The diocese covers the traditional county of Essex, an area of 3,959 km^{2} comprising the non-metropolitan County of Essex, the unitary authorities of Southend-on-Sea and Thurrock, and the London boroughs of Barking & Dagenham, Havering, Newham, Redbridge and Waltham Forest, matching Essex's historic boundaries and the Anglican Diocese of Chelmsford. The see is in the town of Brentwood where the seat is located at the Cathedral Church of Saint Mary and Saint Helen. It has 82 parishes, among these 47 parishes are in London; Havering (11), Barking and Dagenham (6), Redbridge (11), Waltham Forest (8), Newham (11).

== History ==
The diocese was erected on 20 July 1917 from the Archdiocese of Westminster. The current bishop is Timothy Menezes, the eighth Bishop of Brentwood.

== Bishops ==
=== Ordinaries ===
- Bernard Nicholas Ward (appointed on 20 July 1917 – died in office on 21 January 1920)
- Arthur Doubleday (appointed on 7 May 1920 – died in office on 23 January 1951)
- George Andrew Beck, A.A. (succeeded on 23 January 1951 – translated to the Diocese of Salford on 28 November 1955)
- Bernard Patrick Wall (appointed on 30 November 1955 – retired on 14 April 1969)
- Patrick Joseph Casey (appointed on 2 December 1969 – resigned on 12 December 1979)
- Thomas McMahon (appointed on 16 June 1980 – resigned on 14 April 2014)
- Alan Williams (14 April 2014 - 10th October 2026)
- Timothy Francis Menezes (appointed on 10th October 2026 - )

=== Coadjutor bishops ===
- George Andrew Beck, A.A. (1948-1951)

=== Other priests who became bishops ===
- Hugh Christopher Budd, appointed Bishop of Plymouth in 1985
- Brian Charles Foley, appointed Bishop of Lancaster in 1962
- John Carmel Heenan, appointed Bishop of Leeds in 1951; future Cardinal
- John Edward Petit, appointed Bishop of Menevia, Wales in 1947

== See also ==
- Catholic Church in England and Wales
- List of Catholic churches in the United Kingdom
