= St Mary's Church, Grimsby =

Coordinates: 53.5678°N 0.0707°W

St Mary's Church
- St Mary on the Sea Church
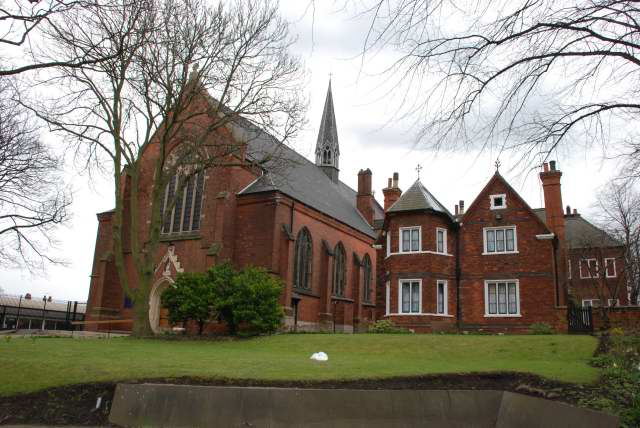

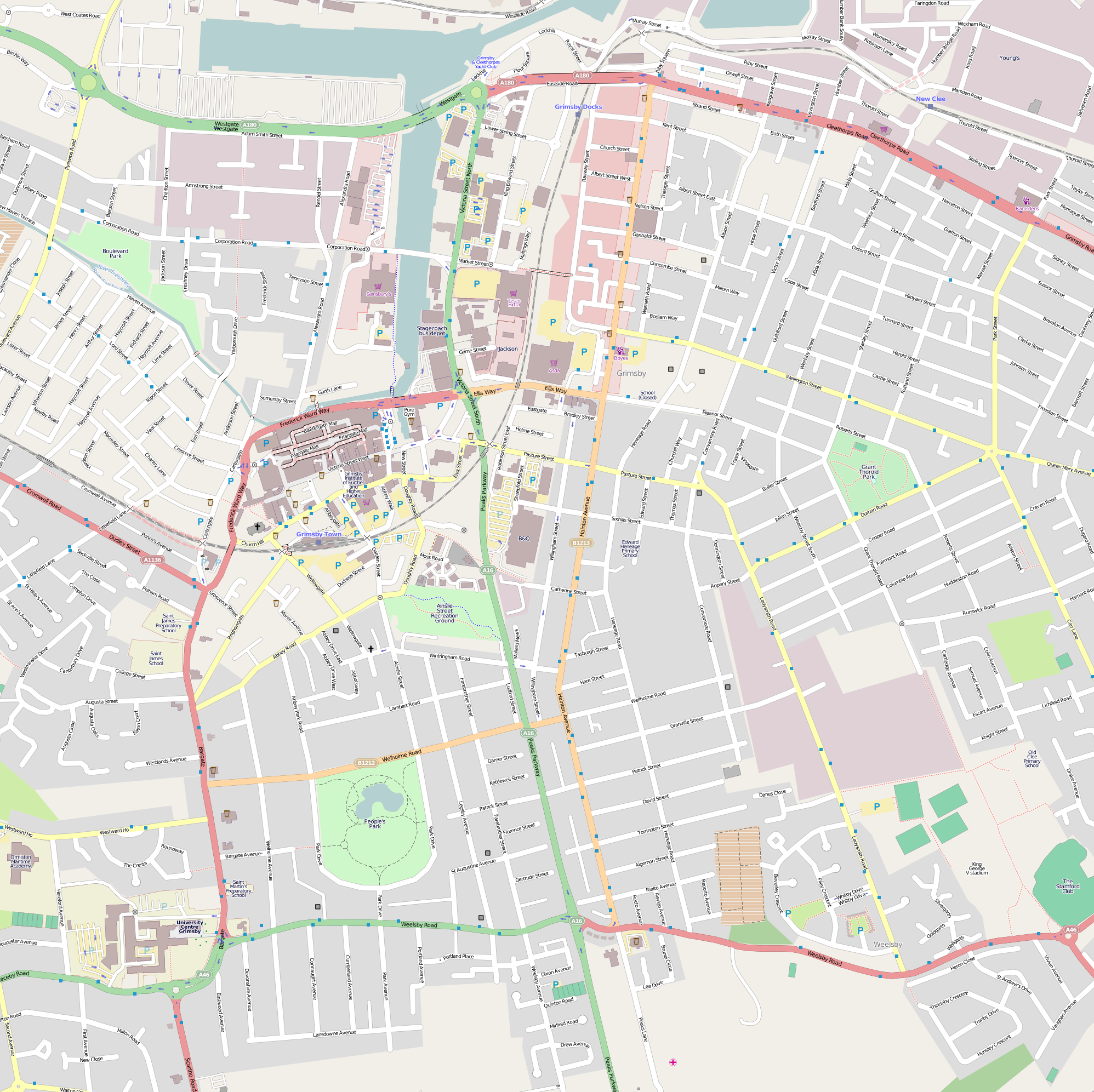
- Location in Grimsby
- OS grid reference: TA 27862 09644
- Location: Grimsby
- Country: England
- Denomination: Roman Catholic

History
- Status: Active
- Dedication: Our Lady, Star of the Sea

Architecture
- Functional status: Parish church
- Heritage designation: Grade II listed
- Designated: 30 June 1999
- Architect: Matthew Ellison Hadfield
- Style: Gothic Revival
- Groundbreaking: 1880
- Completed: 19 August 1883

Administration
- Province: Westminster
- Diocese: Nottingham
- Deanery: Grimsby
- Parish: The Most Holy and Undivided Trinity, Grimsby, Cleethorpes and Immingham

St Mary's Church or its full name St Mary on the Sea Church is a Roman Catholic Parish Church in Grimsby, Lincolnshire. It was built from 1880 to 1883. It is situated on the corner of Heneage Road and Wellington Street in the town centre. It was designed by Hadfield and Son and is a Grade II listed building.

== History ==
=== Construction ===
In 1858, Sir John Sutton, a local landowner bought the site for the church, but died before building on it started. In 1880, more than thirty years after the purchase of the site, did construction begin. The majority of the cost was paid for by Thomas Young of Kingerby Hall, who also paid for the building of several other churches in Lincolnshire. The church was designed by Matthew Ellison Hadfield and his son Charles Hadfield, who was also the architects for Salford and Sheffield cathedrals. The initial plan for the church was that it would be double the size of what was built, but it would have been too expensive, so a smaller than planned church was built. On 19 August 1883, the church was opened by the Bishop of Nottingham, Edward Bagshawe.

The sacred heart altar was designed by Pugin & Pugin. It was given to the church by Georgina Fraser, the daughter of George Heneage and sister of Baron Heneage.

The church has some stained-glass windows designed by the studio Hardman & Co.

=== Reordering and redecoration ===
In 1908, wall paintings were added to the sanctuary. They were made in the studio of Nathaniel Westlake. Other paintings were added in the 1930s, such as a dado frieze depicting fish that went along the interior perimeter of the church.

In the 1960s, the wall paintings were covered over with paint. In 1979, the church was reordered and a new altar and lectern were installed. In 1983, a narthex was created at the back of the church.

In the 2000s, efforts were made to uncover the wall paintings. In addition, the organ, from the 1920s was also restored.

== Parish ==
St Mary's Church has one Sunday Mass in Polish at 6pm on Saturday (vigil) and one in English on Sunday at 11.00 am. At the church, during the week there are usually Masses at 7.00 pm on Wednesday and 10.00 am on Thursday.

== See also ==
- Roman Catholic Diocese of Nottingham
