= Michael Ingram (psychologist) =

Michael Ingram (c. 1932 – 26 August 2000) was an English child psychologist, Catholic priest and convicted sex offender.

== Biography ==
Ordained as a priest in 1964, he trained as a child counsellor at Oxford. He was a Dominican priest at Holy Cross Priory in Leicester. He worked as a child psychologist at St. Thomas' Hospital, London.

Ingram presented research at Swansea University's 1977 Love and Attraction conference. He criticised the prosecution of child sex abuse cases in a presentation at the Second International Congress on Child Abuse and Neglect in London in 1978. According to Ruth Gledhill, Ingram argued that "paedophiles could do more good to their victims than harm." Ingram's research was repudiated by Bishop of Nottingham James McGuinness and he left ordained ministry in 1991.

In August 2000, Ingram was found guilty of seven counts of indecent assault, gross indecency and serious sexual offence against six altar boys at Holy Cross Priory between 1970 and 1978. Shortly before the verdict was handed down, Ingram drove his car into a wall at high speed and was in intensive care in a prison health care facility when the verdict was issued. Ingram died on 26 August 2000 while in custody at HM Prison Leicester.

== See also ==
- Catholic Church sexual abuse cases
