= St Thomas of Canterbury Church, Gainsborough =

Coordinates: 53.4005°N 0.7715°W

St Thomas's Church
- The Church of St Thomas of Canterbury
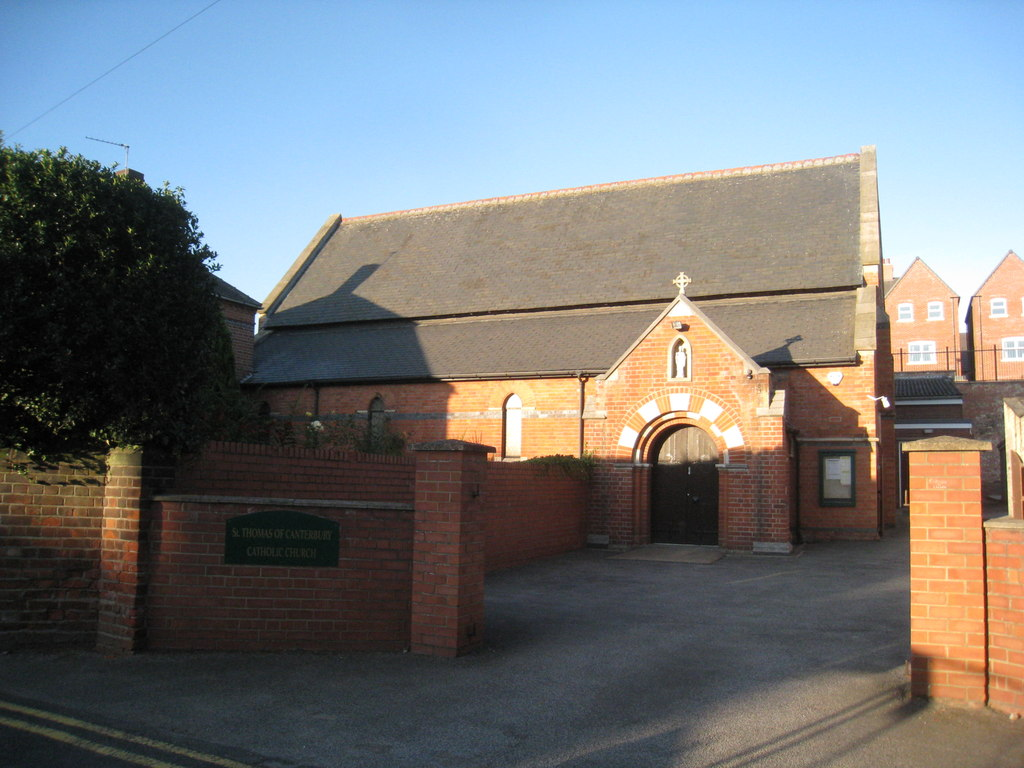
- St Thomas's Church
- OS grid reference: SK 81774 90001
- Address: 6 Cross St, Gainsborough DN21 2AX
- Country: England
- Denomination: Roman Catholic
- Website: https://www.stthomasgainsborough.co.uk/

History
- Dedication: St Thomas of Canterbury

Architecture
- Heritage designation: Grade II
- Architect: Matthew Ellison Hadfield,
- Style: Gothic Revival
- Years built: 1866-1868

Administration
- Province: Westminster
- Diocese: Nottingham
- Deanery: Northern Lincolnshire

Clergy
- Priest: Fr. David Palmer

The Church of St Thomas of Canterbury is a 19th century Catholic Church located on Cross Street in Gainsborough, Lincolnshire, England. The church is located in the Diocese of Nottingham and is a Grade II listed building.

== History ==
Construction began in 1866 and the church officially opened in 1868. The church was mostly paid for by Thomas Young of Kingerby Hall at a cost of £1250. The church was designed by the architect Matthew Ellison Hadfield, a proponent of the Gothic Revival movement led by A.W.N Pugin. The church is built of red brick with a Welsh slate roof. Prior to WW1, the church had a very ornate interior, which was stripped out after the war, however in 2008, efforts were taken to reverse this, with the Sanctuary being decorated in a style more reminiscent of Pugin.
