= St Hugh's Church, Lincoln =

Coordinates: 53.2305°N 0.5357°W

St Hugh's Church
- St Hugh of Lincoln Church
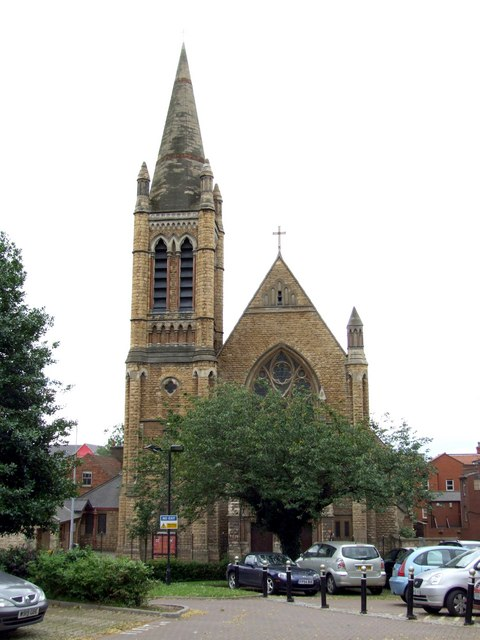

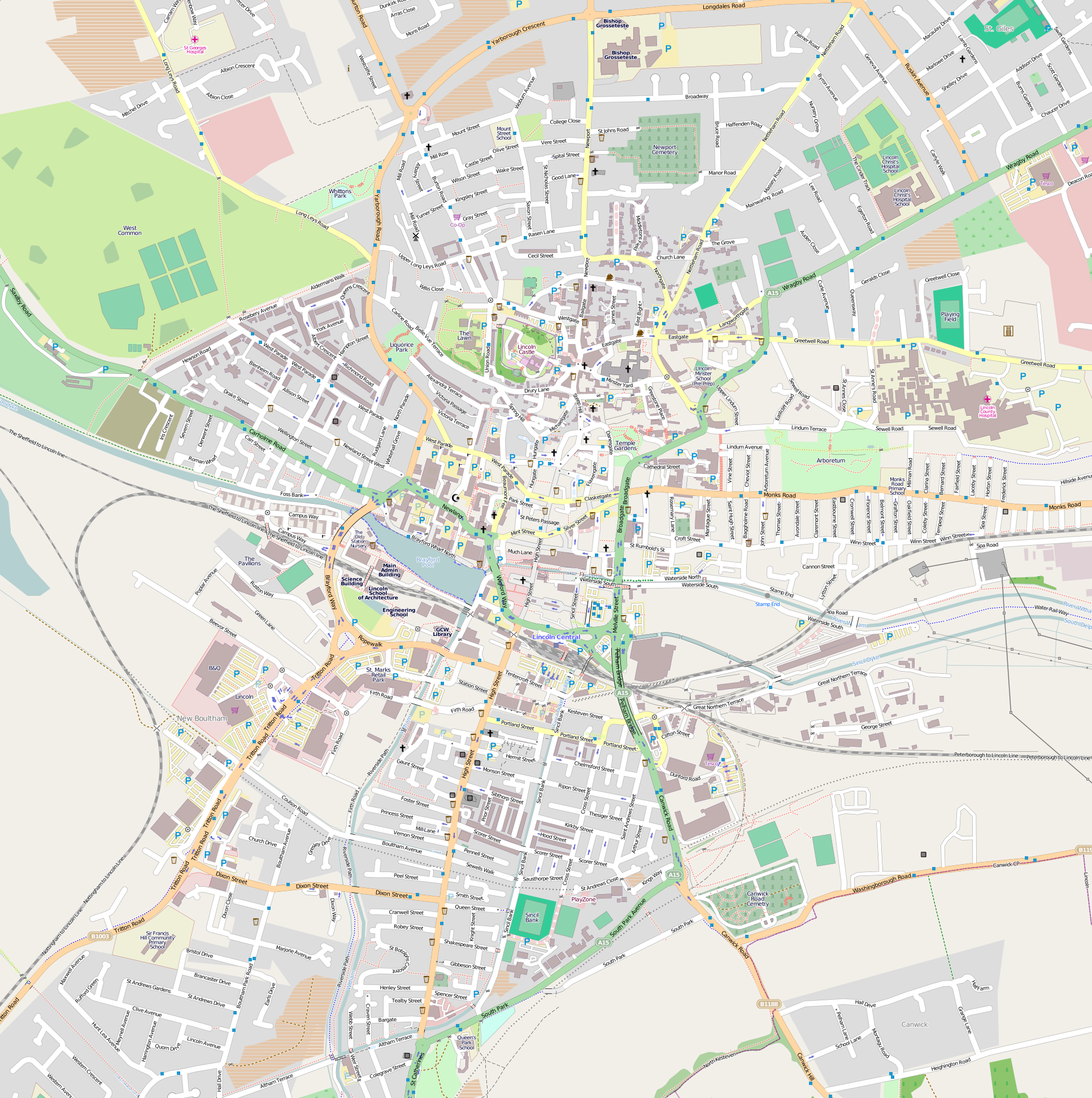
- Location in Lincoln
- OS grid reference: SK 97840 71388
- Location: Lincoln
- Country: England
- Denomination: Roman Catholic
- Website: StHughsLincoln.org.uk

History
- Status: Active
- Dedication: Hugh of Lincoln

Architecture
- Functional status: Parish church
- Heritage designation: Grade II listed
- Designated: 8 July 1991
- Architect: Albert Vicars
- Style: Gothic Revival
- Groundbreaking: 17 November 1892
- Completed: 19 December 1893
- Construction cost: £7,300

Administration
- Province: Westminster
- Diocese: Nottingham
- Deanery: Lincoln

St Hugh's Church or St Hugh of Lincoln Church is a Roman Catholic Parish church in Lincoln, England. It was built from 1892 to 1893. It is situated on the corner of Monks Road and Friars Lane in the city centre. It was designed by Albert Vicars and is a Grade II listed building.

== History ==
=== Foundation ===
From 1799, a Roman Catholic chapel existed in Lincoln. It was at the junction of Broadgate and Silver Street. In 1870, Thomas Young of Kingerby Hall, who had been behind the construction of several Catholic churches in Lincolnshire, drew up plans to build in a church in its place. These plans came to nothing, so in 1886, the mayor of Lincoln, Francis Clarke, put forward £7,000 to build a church in the same place. He hired Albert Vicars, who designed St Anne's Church in Birmingham and helped design St Peter's Cathedral in Belfast. Francis Clarke died in 1888, and £3,500 was given for the church's construction by his estate trustees. By 1892, enough money had been collected to build the church.

=== Construction ===
On 17 November 1892, the church foundation stone was laid by the Bishop of Nottingham, Edward Bagshawe. Construction work finished the next year, to a total cost of £7,300, and on 19 December 1893, the church was opened by Cardinal Herbert Vaughan.

=== Renovations ===
In November 1897 the stations of the cross were added. A new porch was added to the church in 1909 as well as several stained-glass windows. Some were designed by Alexander Gascoyne, who also did windows for St Peter and St Paul's Church in Nottinghamshire. The west window was installed in 1921. From 2008 to 2010, the church interior was refurbished with a new stone altar being added and the ceiling painted.

== Parish ==
St Hugh's Church has three Sunday Masses at 8.30am, 10.00am and 6.00pm. There is a Mass in Polish at 12.15pm. Every third Sunday there is an African Mass in the English language at 3pm. From Monday to Saturday there is a weekday Mass at 10am.

== External features ==
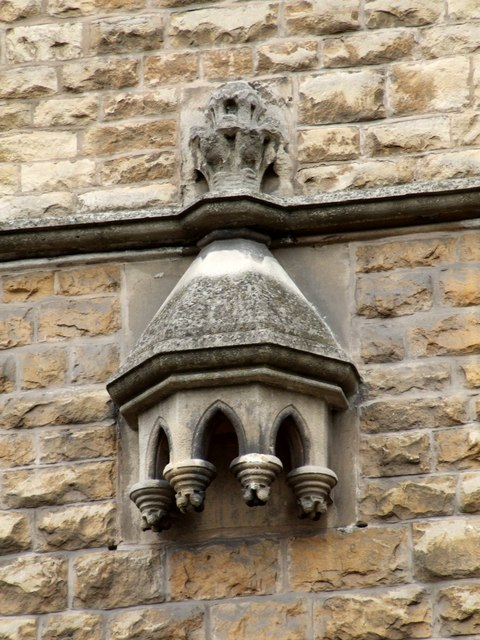
Church detail

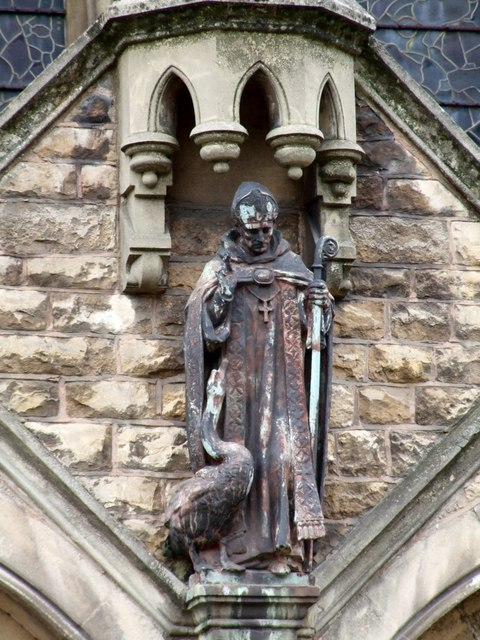
Statue of St Hugh of Lincoln

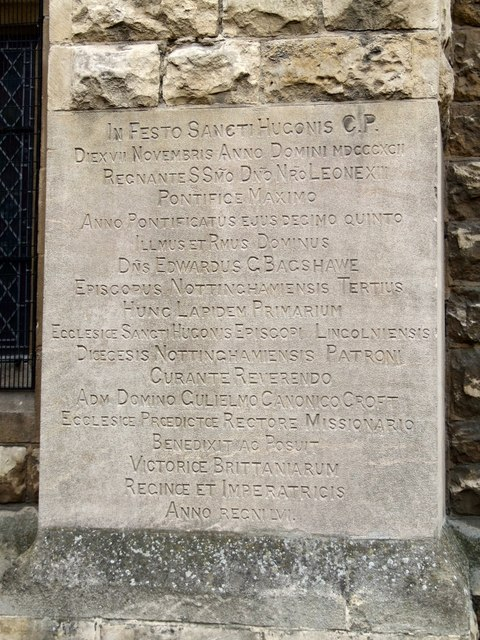
Foundation Stone

== See also ==
- Roman Catholic Diocese of Nottingham
