= John Sherrington =

Roman Catholic Archbishop of Liverpool

His Grace the Most Reverend John Sherrington
- Archbishop of Liverpool
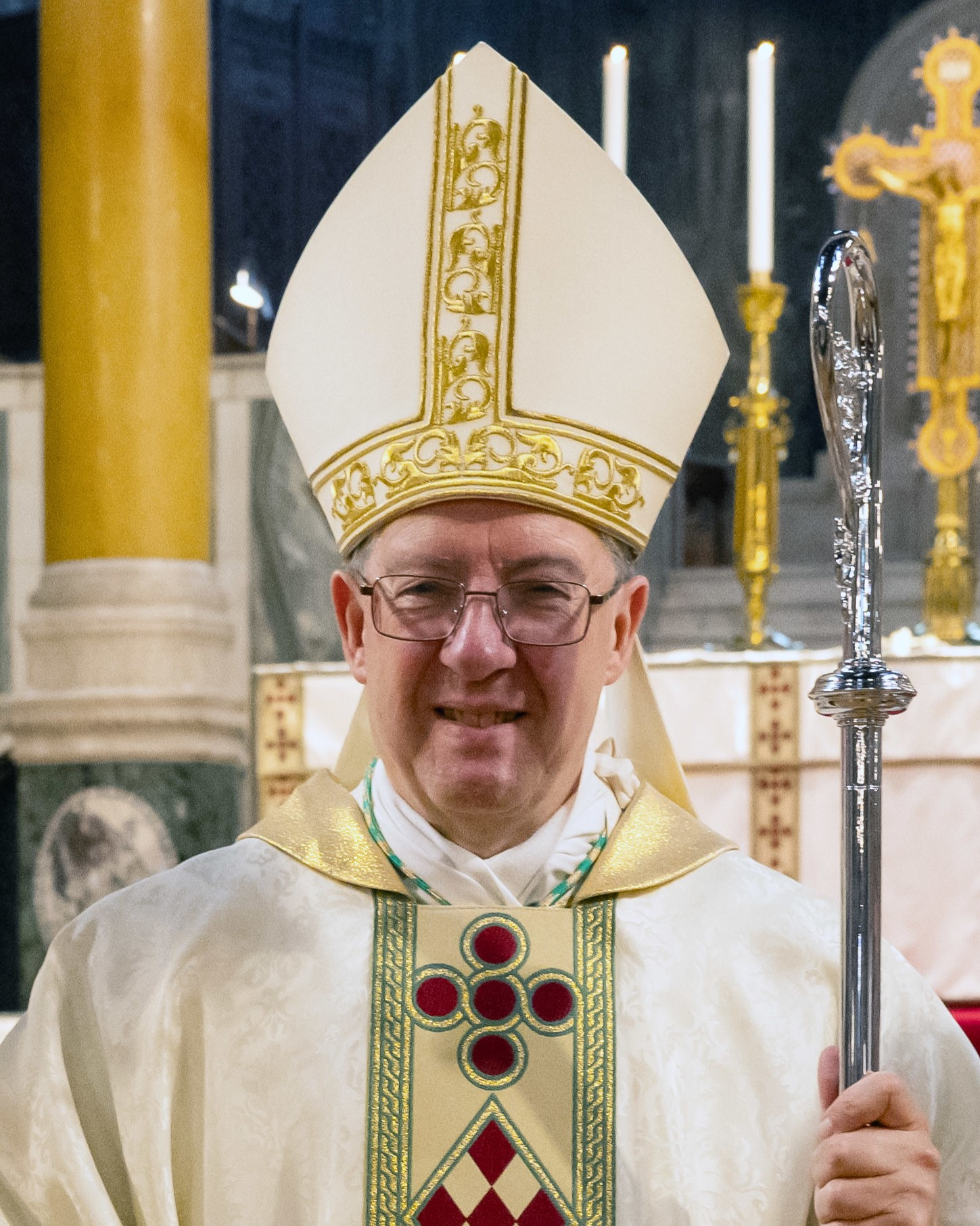
- Bishop Sherrington in 2024
- Church: Roman Catholic Church
- Province: Liverpool
- Diocese: Liverpool
- Appointed: 5 April 2025
- Installed: 27 May 2025
- Predecessor: Malcolm Patrick McMahon
- Previous posts: Titular Bishop of Hilta; Auxiliary Bishop in Westminster

Orders
- Ordination: 13 June 1987 by James McGuinness
- Consecration: 14 September 2011 by Vincent Nichols

Personal details
- Born: 5 January 1958 (age 68) Leicester, England
- Denomination: Roman Catholic
- Motto: Latin: Sufficit tibi gratia mea, lit. 'My grace is sufficient for thee'
- Coat of arms

John Francis Sherrington (born 5 January 1958) is an English Catholic prelate who has served as Metropolitan Archbishop of Liverpool since May 2025. He previously served as auxiliary bishop of the Diocese of Westminster from 2011 to 2025. He had previously taught at two seminaries and served as part of the clergy of the Diocese of Nottingham.

== Early life and education ==
Sherrington was born on 5 January 1958 in Leicester, England, to Frank and Catherine Sherrington. He attended St Thomas More Roman Catholic Primary School and Wyggeston Grammar School for Boys, both in Leicester. After his secondary education, he studied mathematics at Queens' College, Cambridge, graduating with a Bachelor of Arts (BA) degree in 1980. He then worked for two years at Arthur Anderson Management Consultants.

== Ordained ministry ==
Sherrington attended seminary at All Hallows College, Dublin. He was ordained a priest for the diocese of Nottingham on 13 June 1987. He served as Parochial Vicar at St Anne's Church in Radcliffe on Trent from 1987 to 1988. He earned a Licentiate in Sacred Theology (STL) degree in moral theology from the Pontifical Gregorian University in Rome (1988–1990).

After completing his STL, he returned to his seminary, All Hallows College, where he was a lecturer in moral theology (1990–1998). He then lectured in moral theology and served as director of studies at the inter-diocesan seminary in St John's Seminary, Wonersh (1998–2004). He returned to parish ministry and was Parish Priest of Our Lady of Lourdes, Mickleover, Derbyshire (2004–2009), while also serving as the episcopal vicar for Derbyshire, and then Parish Priest of the Church of the Good Shepherd, Arnold, Nottingham (2009-2011). At the same time he held the office of President of the Diocesan Commission for Marriage and Family Life and he has been a Consultor of the Catholic Bishops' Conference of England and Wales on issues of morality.

=== Episcopal ministry ===
On 30 June 2011, Sherrington was appointed an auxiliary bishop of Westminster and titular bishop of Hilta by Pope Benedict XVI. He received his episcopal consecration on the following 14 September from Archbishop Vincent Nichols, with Cardinal Cormac Murphy-O’Connor and Bishop Malcolm McMahon acting as co-consecrators. From 2011 to 2016, he had oversight of the deaneries of Hertfordshire, and then had oversight of the deaneries of North London.

On 5 April 2025, Pope Francis appointed him as the Metropolitan Archbishop of Liverpool. He was installed as the 10th Archbishop of Liverpool on 27 May 2025.
