= Edward Ellis (bishop) =

British Catholic bishop (1899–1974)

- Bishop of Nottingham
- Church: Catholic Church
- Diocese: Diocese of Nottingham
- In office: 18 March 1944 – 31 October 1974
- Predecessor: John McNulty
- Successor: James McGuinness

Orders
- Ordination: 15 October 1922 by Thomas Dunn
- Consecration: 1 May 1944 by William Godfrey

Personal details
- Born: 30 June 1899 Radford, Nottingham, United Kingdom
- Died: 6 July 1979 (aged 80) Nottingham, United Kingdom

Edward Ellis was Bishop of the Roman Catholic Diocese of Nottingham from 1944 to 1974.

== Early life and education ==
He was born on 30 June 1899 in Radford, Nottingham. He was educated at St Mary's School, and later at Ratcliffe College, before attending the Venerable English College.

== Priest ==
Ellis was ordained priest on 15 October 1922 by Bishop Thomas Dunn in Nottingham. He was initially appointed as a curate at Hadfield, before being appointed as Cathedral Administrator for Nottingham Cathedral in 1930. He returned to Hadfield as parish priest in 1933, and was once again re-appointed as Cathedral Administrator in 1939.

== Bishop of Nottingham ==
On 18 March 1944, Ellis was appointed the seventh Bishop of Nottingham by Pope Pius XII after the death of Bishop John McNulty. He received his episcopal consecration the following year on 1 May from Archbishop Godfrey of Westminster. He would serve as bishop for thirty years.

Whilst bishop, Ellis attended the Second Vatican Council for its four sessions. He would become involved in the application of the council within the diocese. The diocese also underwent large growth, with the Catholic population growing alongside the number of parishes. Ellis was also concerned with education, establishing many new Catholic schools within the diocese. As well as this, he established the Briars Residential Centre for young people in the Diocese of Nottingham in 1970.

== Death and legacy ==
Bishop Ellis experienced some ill-health during his episcopate, and as such, consecrated James McGuinness as co-adjutor bishop in 1972. McGuinness would succeed Ellis when he retired as Bishop of Nottingham on 31 October 1974, aged 75.

In 1976, he was granted Freedom of the City of Nottingham in recognition of his service to the city.

Ellis died on 6 July 1979, aged 80, as Bishop Emeritus of Nottingham. He was buried in the crypt of Nottingham Cathedral, where he had been bishop.

He was a priest for 56 years and a bishop for 35 years.

A school in the Diocese of Nottingham, Bishop Ellis Primary School, is named after him.
