= Diocese of Nottingham =

Roman Catholic diocese in England

Coordinates: 52.9545°N 1.1572°W

Diocese of Nottingham Dioecesis Nottinghamensis

Catholic
- Coat of arms

Location
- Country: England
- Territory: Derbyshire (without parts of High Peak & Chesterfield); Leicestershire; Lincolnshire; Nottinghamshire (without Bassetlaw); Rutland
- Ecclesiastical province: Westminster
- Metropolitan: Diocese of Westminster
- Deaneries: 8

Statistics
- Area: 13,000 km^{2} (5,000 sq mi)
- Population: Total; Catholics: (as of 2013); 4,500,000; 155,000 (3.4%)
- Parishes: 108

Information
- Denomination: Catholic
- Sui iuris church: Latin Church
- Rite: Roman Rite
- Cathedral: Nottingham Cathedral
- Secular priests: 130

Current leadership
- Pope: Leo XIV
- Bishop: Patrick McKinney
- Metropolitan Archbishop: Richard Moth
- Vicar General: Edward Jarosz; John Kyne
- Episcopal Vicars: Paul Chipcase; Simon Gillespie; Michael Moore; Susan Richert
- Judicial Vicar: Peter Vellacott

Map
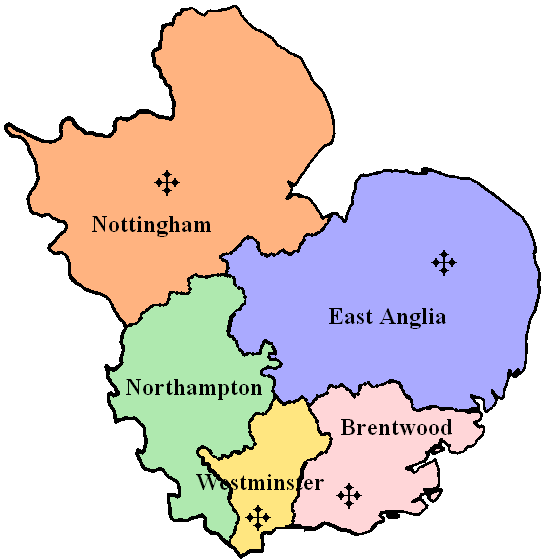
- Diocese of Nottingham within the Province of Westminster

Website
- dioceseofnottingham.uk

The Diocese of Nottingham (Latin: Dioecesis Nottinghamensis) is a Latin Church diocese of the Catholic church in England and a suffragan of the Metropolitan Diocese of Westminster.

The diocese covers an area of 13,074 square kilometres (5,048 mi^{2}), taking in the English counties of Nottinghamshire (now excluding the district of Bassetlaw), Leicestershire, most of Derbyshire, Rutland and Lincolnshire. The episcopal seat is the Cathedral Church of St Barnabas in Nottingham.

Patrick McKinney is the 10th bishop of Nottingham.

== History ==
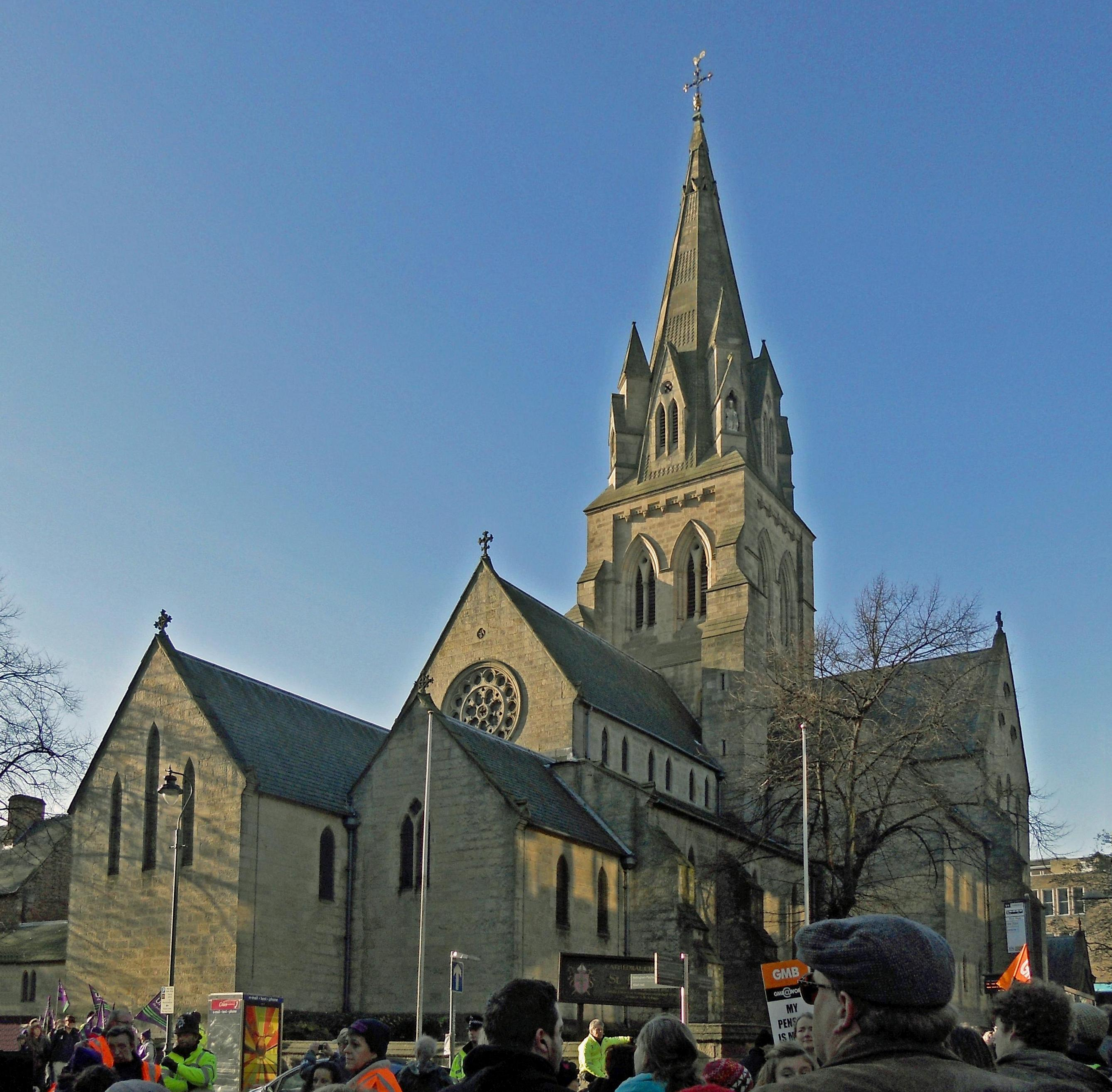
Nottingham Cathedral

It was one of twelve English dioceses created at the restoration of the hierarchy by Pius IX in 1850, embracing the counties of Nottingham, Leicester, Derby, Lincoln and Rutland. These had comprised part of the Apostolic Vicariate of the Midland District, when at the request of King James II in 1685, the Holy See divided England into four vicariates: the London, the Northern, the Midland and the Western. Before 1840, when the number of vicars apostolic was increased from four to eight, the Midland District consisted of fifteen counties.

In 1850 Nottingham had 24 permanent missions, many of these little better than villages. For the most part they originated from chaplaincies which had through penal times been maintained by the Catholic nobility and gentry, or had been founded independently by them. Among these there existed foundations of several religious orders. In Derbyshire the Jesuits had missions at Chesterfield and Spinkhill, in Lincolnshire at Lincoln, Boston and Market Rasen. The Dominican Order was settled in Leicester, the Fathers of Charity carried on several missions in Leicestershire, and the Cistercians occupied Mount St Bernard Abbey in Charnwood Forest.

From the appearance of the Jesuits in England in 1580 at the special request of William Allen, they had done much by their labours to keep alive the Catholic faith in the Nottingham diocese. Of their missions mentioned above some were among the earliest of the Society of Jesus in England dating back some three hundred years. Derby was included in the district or college of the Society called the "Immaculate Conception", founded by Richard Blount, about 1633, first provincial superior of the English Province. Extinct for many years, it was revived in 1842 as Mount St Mary's College, when the new college and convictus was established by the then-provincial, Randall Lythgoe.

After the Reformation, the English Province of the Friars Preachers ceased to exist, until resuscitated at Bornem in Flanders by Philip Howard, later cardinal, who became the first prior of the Dominicans in 1675. The first introduction of the English Dominicans from Bornem was at Hinckley, whence for many years Leicester was served by them at intervals. Their mission at Leicester was put on a permanent basis in 1798 by the purchase of a house by Francis Xavier Choppelle. Holy Cross Priory, Leicester was begun by Benedict Caestryck in 1815 and was opened in 1819. The dedication under the title of Holy Cross was adopted on account of the celebrated relic of the Holy Cross brought from Bornem.

After the lapse of three centuries a monastery of the Cistercian Order was resuscitated in England by the foundation of the Abbey of Mount St Bernard in Leicestershire, made possible by the assistance of Ambrose Phillips de Lisle of Grace Dieu Manor, who after his conversion in December 1825, devoted his energies to the spread of the Catholic faith in England by the re-establishment in the country of monastic institutions. In 1835 he purchased about 227 acres (0.92 km^{2}) of wild uncultivated land in Charnwood Forest and presented it to the Cistercians.

Beginning with one brother who lived alone in a four-roomed cottage, the community rapidly increased, and a larger building was erected as well as a small chapel, opened by Thomas Walsh on 11 October 1837. In a short time this proved insufficient and John Talbot, 16th Earl of Shrewsbury offered them £2,000, on condition that a new monastery should be erected, choosing for that purpose the present site of the abbey. It was built from designs by Augustus Pugin. In 1848, by papal brief of Pius IX, the monastery of Mount St Bernard was raised to the dignity of an abbey, and John Bernard Palmer, the first mitred abbot in England since the Reformation, was consecrated on 18 February 1849.

In introducing the Cistercians into England, de Lisle had hoped that they would undertake missionary work and with this view he had built three chapels: at Grace-Dieu, Whitwick and the abbey. On the score of their rule, they declined to take charge permanently of the missions. De Lisle then decided to bring from Italy members of the Institute of Charity. After much negotiation with the head of the order, Aloysius Gentili came to Grace Dieu as chaplain. This was the commencement of the settlement of the Rosminians in the diocese. In 1841 Dr Walsh made over to them the secular mission of Loughborough founded in 1832 by Benjamin Hulme. The buildings were too small to permit of a novitiate and a college of their own which they were desirous to establish. To carry out this twofold object, about 9 acres (36,000 m^{2}) were purchased; the foundation stone of the new buildings was laid in May 1843 and in 1844 was opened the first college and novitiate house of the institute in England. The Sisters of Mercy had come to Nottingham in 1844, and in 1846 entered their convent in close proximity to the cathedral.

The first bishop of Nottingham was Joseph William Hendren (born 1792), consecrated on 10 September 1848, as Vicar Apostolic of the Western District, transferred to the bishopric of Clifton on 29 September 1850, and to Nottingham on 22 June 1851. The cathedral church of St Barnabas was built by Pugin in the lancet style of architecture.

Owing to ill-health, Hendren resigned in 1853 and was succeeded by Richard Roskell, born at Gateacre, near Liverpool, in 1817. He was sent to Ushaw College and afterwards to Rome, where he took his degree and was ordained in 1840. He was consecrated in the cathedral by Cardinal Wiseman on 21 September 1853. During his episcopate a number of missions were founded in the counties of the diocese. In Lincolnshire, through the generosity of Thomas Arthur Young of Kingerby Hall, not only was there a church and presbytery built at Gainsborough and Grimsby, but the Premonstratensian order was re-introduced into England at Crowle and Spalding. Thomas Young also planned to build a church in Lincoln, but it was not until 1893 that St Hugh's Church, Lincoln was opened.

In 1874, owing to Roskell's ill-health, the pope appointed Edward Gilpin Bagshawe of the London Oratory his coadjutor. The same year, Roskell tendered his resignation and Bagshawe was consecrated at the London Oratory on 12 November 1874. Numerous missions necessitated by the development of the mining industry were opened during his administration, and communities of nuns introduced into the diocese, which he served for 27 years. He resigned in 1901 and in 1904 was transferred to the titular Archbishopric of Seleucia.

Robert Brindle, Bagshawe's successor, was born at Liverpool on 4 November 1837. The first Roman Catholic chaplain to receive the pension for distinguished and meritorious service, as well as Turkish and Egyptian orders and medals, he was, after his retirement from the army in 1899, on the petition of Cardinal Herbert Vaughan, third Archbishop of Westminster, appointed his assistant, and on the resignation of Bagshawe, received his Brief to the See of Nottingham on 6 November 1901.

In 1910 there were in the diocese 32,000 Catholics; 84 secular and 44 regular priests; 75 churches with missions attached, 31 without missions; 6 convents for men and 9 for women.

In 1980, 16 parishes were transferred to the newly created Diocese of Hallam; this resulted in Bassetlaw in Nottinghamshire and parts of Chesterfield and the High Peak in Derbyshire ceasing to be part of the diocese.

== Bishops ==
=== Past and present ordinaries ===
- Joseph William Hendren, O.F.M. Rec. (1851-1853)
- Richard Butler Roskell (1853-1874)
- Edward Gilpin Bagshawe, C.O. (1874-1901)
- Robert Brindle (1901-1915)
- Thomas Dunn (1916-1931)
- John Francis McNulty (1932-1943)
- Edward Ellis (1944-1974)
- James Joseph McGuinness (1974-2000)
- Malcolm Patrick McMahon, O.P. (2000-2014), appointed Archbishop of Liverpool
- Patrick Joseph McKinney (2015- )

=== Coadjutor bishops ===
- James Joseph McGuinness (1972-1974)

=== Other priests of this diocese who became bishops ===
- William Eric Grasar, appointed Bishop of Shrewsbury in 1962
- John Francis Sherrington, appointed auxiliary bishop of Westminster in 2011
- Cyril Edward Restieaux, appointed Bishop of Plymouth in 1955

== Sexual abuse in the diocese ==
In 2014, 85-year-old Francis Paul Cullen, who had served as a priest in the parishes of Hyson Green and Mackworth and Buxton in the diocese, admitted 21 sexual assault charges against two young girls and five altar boys. He had been on the run in Tenerife for 20 years. The offences took place over a 34-year period from 1957 to 1991 and involved children aged from six to sixteen. A police spokesperson said that it was “inconceivable” that Cullen had not abused more children during his time as a priest. During the court case the diocese insisted there were no records of anybody complaining to the Church at the time, however at least one victim said their parents did report the abuse to the Church.

In 2011 the Diocesan Safeguarding Co-ordinator reported that there had been "12 new concerns/allegations which needed to be dealt with" during the previous year, and that he welcomed the paring back of a Government Vetting and Barring Scheme.

== Environmental policy ==
The diocese and its seven constituent charitable trusts have adopted an Environmental Policy Framework which commits the diocese to eight points of action covering formation, decarbonisation, biodiversity, use of resources, ethics, conformity, resilience and advocacy.

== See also ==
- Notable churches in the diocese are listed at List of Catholic churches in Nottingham
- List of Catholic churches in the United Kingdom
- Catholic Church in England and Wales
