= Patrick McKinney =

British bishop

The Right Reverend Patrick McKinney S.T.L
- Bishop of Nottingham
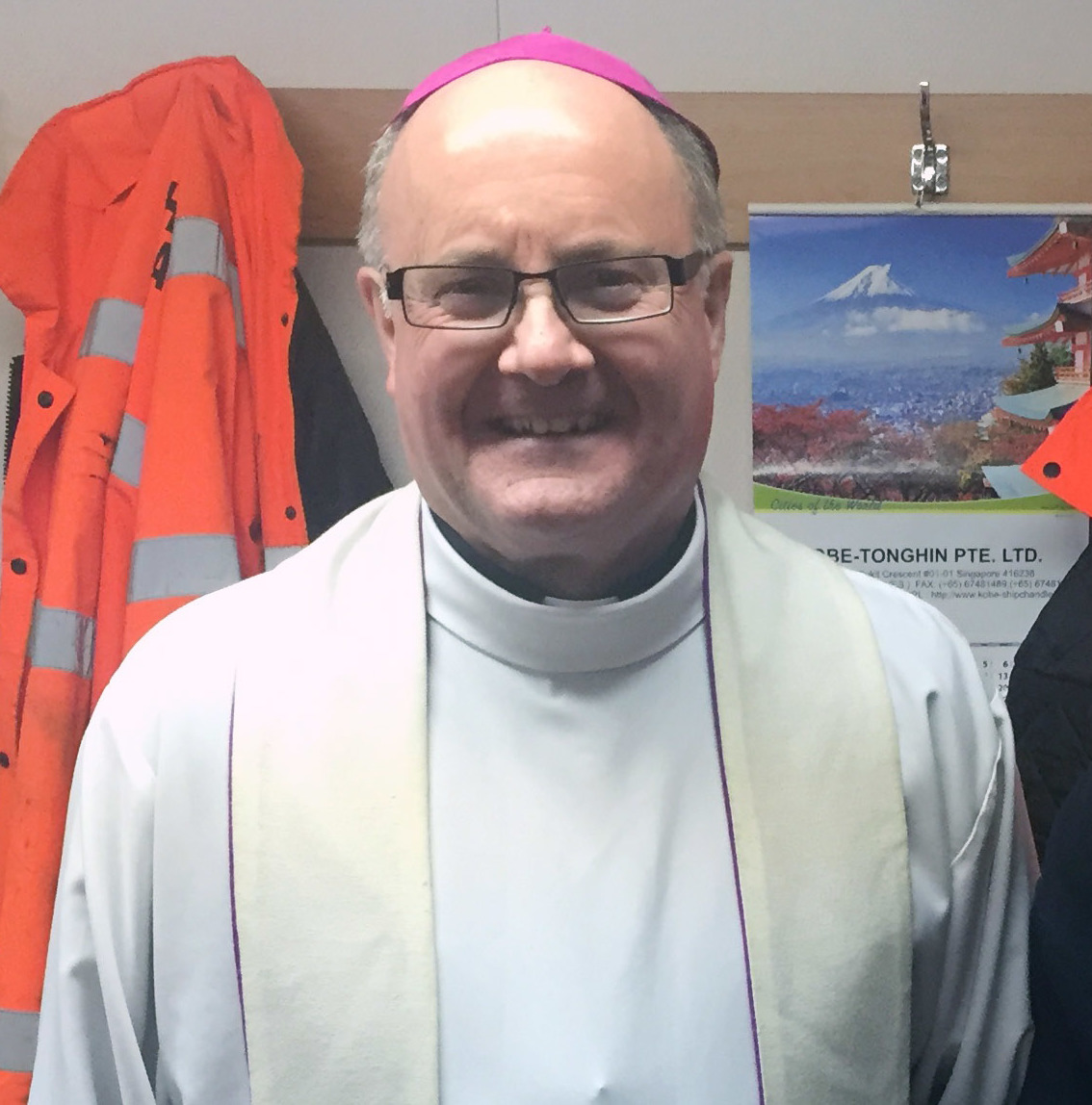
- Bishop McKinney in 2016
- Church: Roman Catholic Church
- Province: Westminster
- Diocese: Nottingham
- Appointed: 14 May 2015
- Installed: 3 July 2015
- Predecessor: Malcolm McMahon
- Previous posts: Parish Priest of Our Lady and All Saints, Stourbridge; Dean of Dudley Deanery; Episcopal Vicar; Parish Priest of St John's, Great Haywood; Rector, St Mary's College, Oscott; Lecturer, St Mary's College, Oscott; Chair of Birmingham Archdiocesan Ecumenical Commission

Orders
- Ordination: 29 July 1978 by Joseph Francis Cleary
- Consecration: 3 July 2015 by Vincent Nichols

Personal details
- Born: 30 April 1954 (age 72) Balsall Heath, Birmingham, England
- Denomination: Roman Catholic
- Residence: Bishop's House, Nottingham
- Parents: Patrick and Bridget McKinney
- Motto: Quaerite Christi Vultum; (Seek the face of Christ)
- Coat of arms

Patrick Joseph McKinney is the 10th Bishop of Nottingham. His appointment was announced on 14 May 2015 by Pope Francis. He previously served as a member of the clergy of the Archdiocese of Birmingham and Rector of St Mary's College, Oscott.

== Early life ==
Patrick McKinney was born on 30 April 1954, the eldest son of Irish immigrants Patrick and Bridget McKinney, and brought up in Birmingham. He began his studies for the priesthood at St Mary's College, Oscott, the Archdiocese of Birmingham’s seminary for the training of priests, in 1972, and was ordained to the priesthood on 29 July 1978 in St Mary’s Church, Buncrana, Co Donegal, Ireland, where his family lives.

== Priesthood ==
After his Ordination he was appointed assistant priest in the parish of Our Lady of Lourdes, Yardley Wood, Birmingham, and chaplain to St Thomas Aquinas Secondary School, Kings Norton, Birmingham. Between 1982 and 1984, he was a student at the Gregorian Pontifical University, Rome, where he gained a Licentiate of Sacred Theology. Returning to the Archdiocese of Birmingham, he taught fundamental theology in St Mary’s College until 1989, when he was appointed Rector of St Mary’s College, a post he held for nine years, during which period he was also a lecturer in Ecclesiology.

He left the College in 1998, and until 2001 he was parish priest of St John’s, Great Haywood, and Episcopal Vicar for the north of the Archdiocese of Birmingham. He left the parish in 2001, remaining as Episcopal Vicar until 2006 when he was appointed parish priest of Our Lady and All Saints, Stourbridge and Dean of the Dudley Deanery.

He was made a Prelate of Honour in 1990 and a member of the Metropolitan Chapter of St Chad in 1992, and has served for a time as Chair of the Birmingham Archdiocesan Ecumenical Commission.

== Bishop ==
Monsignor McKinney was appointed tenth bishop of Nottingham in succession to Malcolm McMahon OP, Archbishop of Liverpool, on 14 May 2015, and was consecrated by Cardinal Vincent Nichols, Archbishop of Westminster, in St Barnabas’ Cathedral, Nottingham on Friday 3 July 2015. McKinney, on his appointment as bishop, spoke of his consciousness of 'God's mercy', and that he always intended to do his best in 'whatever God asked'. He also paid homage to his predecessor's legacy.

Bishop McKinney was criticised over his handling of a reported case of sexual abuse. The victim claims that Bishop McKinney had been obstinate in not pursuing his claims against a priest from the Diocese of Nottingham, who reportedly committed the act whilst visiting a diocese in Ireland.

McKinney, along with other Catholic Bishops in England and Wales, signed a letter calling for the protection of workers and for firms to commit to paying a living wage. The letter, co-written and signed by McKinney, believed it was necessary to pay a living wage to counteract the 'harm caused by poverty', which he called 'a source of national shame'.

In 2020, Pope Francis appointed Bishop Patrick McKinney to the Pontifical Council for Interreligious Dialogue.

McKinney has also been an advocate for the cause of canonisation of Venerable Mary Potter, a religious sister who worked in the Diocese of Nottingham.

Catholic Church titles
Preceded by Malcolm McMahon	Bishop of Nottingham; 2015 – present	Incumbent
