= John McNulty (bishop) =

English prelate

- Bishop of Nottingham
- Church: Catholic Church
- Diocese: Diocese of Nottingham
- In office: 13 May 1932 – 8 June 1943
- Predecessor: Thomas Dunn
- Successor: Edward Ellis

Orders
- Ordination: 16 April 1911
- Consecration: 11 June 1932 by Francis Bourne

Personal details
- Born: John Francis McNulty; 11 August 1879 Collyhurst, Manchester, United Kingdom
- Died: 8 June 1943 (aged 63) Dollis Hill, London, United Kingdom

J

ohn Francis McNulty (11 August 1879 – 8 June 1943) was an English prelate of the Roman Catholic Church. He served as Bishop of Nottingham from 1932 until his death in 1943.

Born in Collyhurst, Manchester on 11 August 1879, he was educated at St Bede's College, Manchester from 1891 to 1894, then at Ushaw College, St Edmund's College, Cambridge and at Oscott College. He was ordained to the priesthood on 16 April 1911.

Following ordination Fr McNulty returned to St Bede's College as College Prefect, he remained in that post until 1921 when he was appointed Master of St Edmund's House, Cambridge. In 1930, Fr McNulty was recalled to the Salford Diocese to take up the post of Parish Priest at St Anne's Church, Ancoats, where he remained for two years.

On 13 May 1932, McNulty was appointed the sixth Bishop of Nottingham by Pope Pius XI. He received his episcopal consecration on the following 11 June from Cardinal Francis Bourne, Archbishop of Westminster, with Bishops Peter Amigo of Southwark and Thomas Henshaw of Salford serving as co-consecrators.

McNulty died in office on 8 June 1943, aged 63 - three days before the eleventh anniversary of his consecration as bishop.

Catholic Church titles
Preceded by Thomas Dunn	Bishop of Nottingham; 1932–1943	Succeeded by Edward Ellis
