= James Turpin (organist) =

English organist, composer and teacher

James Turpin FRCO (15 December 1840 in Nottingham – 29 July 1896 in Brighton) was an English organist, composer and teacher.

== Career ==
He was born in Nottingham on 15 December 1840 into a musical family which ran a dealership in musical instruments at 20 Chapel Bar, Nottingham. His brother Edmund Hart Turpin was organist at Nottingham Cathedral and James succeeded him in this position in 1866. James Turpin was an excellent musician, being amongst many other good things, a capable organist and a painstaking teacher. He achieved his FRCO in 1875. He graduated Mus Bac at the Cambridge University in 1880.

He was active as an organ recitalist, organist, pianist and lecturer. As an organist he was well known and gave many recitals, including at the Royal Albert Hall during the International Inventions Exhibition in 1885. Besides being an organist in various churches, James Turpin was also a good pianist. Furthermore, he was Professor of harmony and counterpoint at Trinity College, London, and music master at Berkhamsted School. James Turpin gave lectures before the Royal College of Organists and the Musical Association.

Turpin was influential in obtaining suitable buildings for the National Training School of Music and also for the Royal College of Organists, of which he was secretary. In later life he suffered for some years from paralysis, and died, on 29 July 1896.

== Appointments ==
- Organist at Nottingham Cathedral 1866 - 1873
- Organist at St Columb's Cathedral 1873 – 1878
- Organist of St Leonard's Church, St Leonards-on-Sea 1878 - 1879
- Organist of Church of St Peter, Great Berkhamsted 1879 -
- Organist of St Andrew’s Church, Watford, Hertfordshire
- Music-master at Berkhampstead School
- Professor of harmony and counterpoint, Trinity College, London

== Compositions ==
He composed a church service, songs, a sonata, and other pieces for the pianoforte.
