= James McGuinness =

James McGuinness may refer to:

- James Kevin McGuinness (1893–1950), American screenwriter and film produce
- James McGuinness (bishop) (1925–2007), Roman Catholic bishop of the Diocese of Nottingham
- Martin McGuinness (James Martin Pacelli McGuinness, 1950–2017), Irish Sinn Féin politician and deputy First Minister of Northern Ireland

== See also ==
- Jim McGuinness (born 1972), Gaelic footballer
- Jay McGuiness (born 1990), English singer and member of The Wanted
