= Robert Brindle =

English prelate (1837-1916)

- Bishop of Nottingham
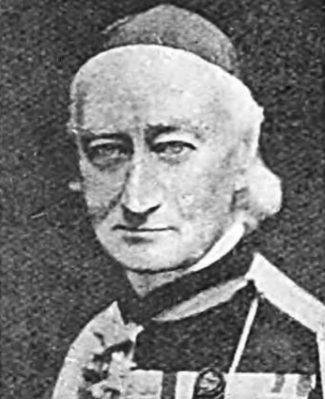
- Church: Catholic Church
- Diocese: Diocese of Nottingham
- In office: 6 December 1901 – 1 June 1915
- Predecessor: Edward Bagshawe
- Successor: Thomas Dunn
- Other post: Titular Bishop of Tacapae (1915-1916)
- Previous posts: Titular Bishop of Hermopolis Maior (1899-1901); Auxiliary Bishop of Westminster (1899-1901)

Orders
- Ordination: 27 December 1862
- Consecration: 12 March 1899 by Francesco Satolli

Personal details
- Born: 4 November 1837 Liverpool, Lancashire, United Kingdom of Great Britain and Ireland
- Died: 27 June 1916 (aged 78)

Robert Brindle DSO (4 November 1837 – 27 June 1916) was an English prelate of the Roman Catholic Church. He served as the Bishop of Nottingham from 1901 to 1915.

== Life ==
Born in Liverpool on 4 November 1837, he was ordained to the priesthood on 27 December 1862. Brindle joined the Royal Army Chaplains' Department. During the Gordon Relief Expedition (1884–85), as an army chaplain he marched with the troops rather than riding with the officers; and handled an oar with the 1st Royal Irish Regiment as they rowed up the Nile. He was mentioned in Kitchener's dispatches for his services to the wounded during the Battle of Omdurman and "only some technical difficulty prevented his receiving a knighthood at the end of the campaign." Sir Evelyn Wood said, "Father Brindle was doubtless the most popular man in the Expedition. His own flock naturally loved him, and he was respected by everyone ... He had a pony which he never rode, it being used to carry foot-sore men in turn." In recognition of services in Egypt and the Sudan, he was awarded the Distinguished Service Order on 16 November 1898. Brindle retired from the army as Chaplain to the Forces First Class in 1899.

He was appointed an Auxiliary Bishop of Westminster and Titular Bishop of Hermopolis Maior on 29 January 1899. His consecration to the Episcopate took place on 12 March 1899, the principal consecrator was Cardinal Francesco Satolli, and the principal co-consecrators were Archbishop Cesare Sambucetti and Archbishop Edmund Stonor. Nearly three years later, he was appointed the Bishop of the Diocese of Nottingham on 6 December 1901.

When King Alfonso XIII of Spain of Spain and Victoria Eugenie of Battenberg wished to be married, the Princess agreed to convert to Catholicism. Her uncle King Edward VII suggested that she take instruction from former army chaplain Monsignor Brindle. Despite anti-Catholic rhetoric on the part of her countrymen, Victoria was received into the Catholic Church in March 1906 at Miramar Palace in a ceremony presided over by Bishop Brindle and the Bishop of Vitoria.

He resigned as Bishop of Nottingham on 1 June 1915 and was appointed Titular Bishop of Tacapae. He died on 27 June 1916, aged 78. The Bishop was given a military funeral, his coffin covered with the Union Jack with his bishop's mitre on it.

== Medals and awards ==
- Distinguished Service Order
- Egypt Medal (three clasps, Suakin 1884, El-Teb-Tamaai, The Nile 1884-85)
- Queen's Sudan Medal
- Ottoman Order of Osmania, Fourth Class
- Ottoman Order of the Medjidie, Third Class
- Khedive's Star 1882
- Khedive's Sudan Medal (three clasps, Hafir, The Atbara, Khartoum)
- Order of Isabella the Catholic

Catholic Church titles
Preceded by Edward Gilpin Bagshawe	Bishop of Nottingham; 1901–1915	Succeeded by Thomas Dunn
