= Mary Potter (nun) =

Catholic religious sister

Venerable Mary Potter LCM
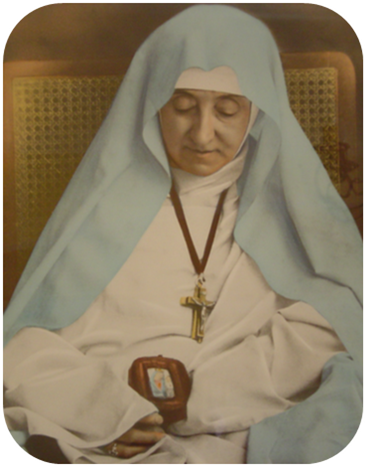
- Venerable Mary Potter
- Born: Mary Potter; 22 November 1847; Bermondsey, London, England
- Died: 9 April 1913 (aged 65); Rome, Italy
- Occupation: Founder Little Company of Mary Sisters
- Parent(s): William and Mary Anne (Martin) Potter
- Website: lcmsisters.org

Mary Potter, LCM (22 November 1847 – 9 April 1913) was an English Catholic religious sister known for founding the Little Company of Mary in 1877.

Her cause for beatification was opened in the 20th century and on 8 February 1988, Pope John Paul II proclaimed her venerable.

== Early life ==
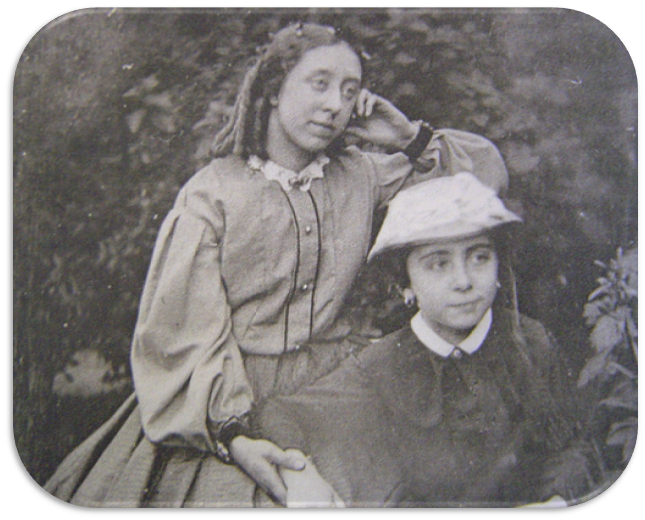
Mary Potter and her sister-in-law Marguerite

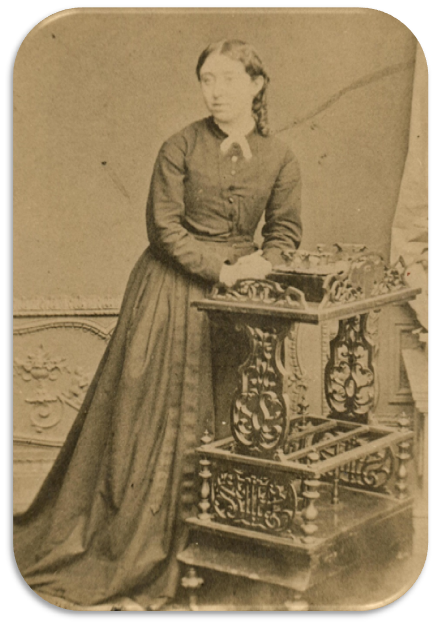
Mary Potter's engagement photo

Mary Potter was born in a rented house in Bermondsey, South London. She was the fifth child, and the only girl, born to William and Mary Anne (Martin) Potter. One of her brothers was the chess master William Norwood Potter. Mary Potter had a congenital heart and lung disease which left her in frail health, and with a permanent cough, for the rest of her life. Her father left the family home in 1848, went to Australia, and never returned, leaving his wife to raise the children by herself.

When Potter was 19, she was introduced to her brother's friend, Godfrey King and became engaged. King, who had tried a vocation as a Trappist monk, gave Potter pious books. After about four months, she wrote to Godfrey to terminate the engagement, after the bishop of Southwark, Thomas Grant, suggested she seek her calling as a religious sister. Because of her delicate health, her mother suggested that Brighton would be a healthy place for her to go.

== Sisterhood ==
Potter resolved to go to Brighton by train with her mother and her brother, and investigate life as a religious. They arrived on 7 December 1868 and met the sisters. After some discussion it was suggested to Potter that the next day, the Feast of the Immaculate Conception, would be a good day to receive her as a postulant. That was a hasty decision and Potter was ill-prepared to enter into religious life so suddenly. However, she decided to stay, receiving the name Mary Angela. It became evident that life in the convent was too demanding physically for Potter and she was advised to leave after eighteen months. Her spiritual director, Father Lambert, SJ, was convinced that she should go into a contemplative order that combined Eucharistic adoration and apostolic activity, rather than a contemplative order such as the Carmelites. Potter left the Sisters of Mercy on 23 June 1870.

As she became stronger, Potter's prayer life became more intense. After a period of prayer and reflection, she started to think of the possibility of founding a group of religious Sisters dedicated to the spiritual and, where possible, the physical assistance of those who were sick and dying. In 1872, she became more and more convinced that it was what she was called to do.

== Little Company of Mary ==
Potter sought spiritual advice from Monsignor John Vertue, newly arrived in Southsea as a military chaplain. She wrote many letters to Vertue. She wrote: "I cannot but feel I have had a call from God to devote myself to help save souls in their last hour. I have been drawn so strongly to pray for the dying." Mary continued to write to Vertue although he was less than encouraging.

In January 1876, Vertue was transferred. Mary's youngest brother, George, by then a teacher at Ratcliffe College, wrote to Mary suggesting that she apply to Bishop Bagshawe, the Bishop of Nottingham, for permission to work in his diocese. Bagshawe offered to pay the rent for 12 months and Potter found a disused stocking factory in Hyson Green for the beginnings of her "special work".

The date of the opening ceremony of her first convent was Easter Monday, 2 April 1877. Potter was soon joined by other young women in this poor area. After a lot of discussion, it was decided to call the group the "Little Company of Mary". Eventually they settled on a simple dress of a plain habit of black and a pale blue veil. The Little Company of Mary sisters helped the sick and poor in their own homes. Bishop Bagshawe did not agree with Potter's vision of the Little Company of Mary and could not understand that she wanted the sisters to be both "active and contemplative". He could not understand her desire that the sisters be in constant prayer for the dying. After three weeks, he deposed Potter as superior and put another sister in charge.

In 1878, Potter underwent two mastectomies within six months. She went to Rome in 1882 to gain approval for the Constitutions of her new Congregation and, while there, established Calvary Hospital near St John Lateran. It was there, in 1908, that the first Catholic Training School for nurses commenced in Italy.

Through contacts with many bishops and laity, the Little Company of Mary became well known, and there were invitations to go to other countries. In 1885, six sisters sailed from Naples to Sydney, Australia. The Little Company of Mary then spread to the southern hemisphere and flourished, attending the sick, the poor and the dying where they were needed.

== Death and beatification process ==
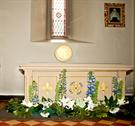
Final resting place in Nottingham Cathedral

Potter died in Rome on Wednesday 9 April 1913. Her spiritual writings were approved by theologians on 25 July 1952. In 1997, her body was returned to England and she now rests in the Nottingham Cathedral.

She had a Nottingham tram named after her, after she was nominated in a BBC poll. In addition, one of the conference rooms in the Newton building of Nottingham Trent University was named in her honour in January 2010, following its refurbishment.

== Works ==
- The Brides of Christ (Our Lady's little library series) Hardcover, 1920
- Devotion for the Dying and the Holy Souls in Purgatory: Mary's Call to Her Loving Children (TAN Books)
