= St Anne's Church, Birmingham =

Coordinates: 52.472335°N 1.884172°W

St Anne's Church
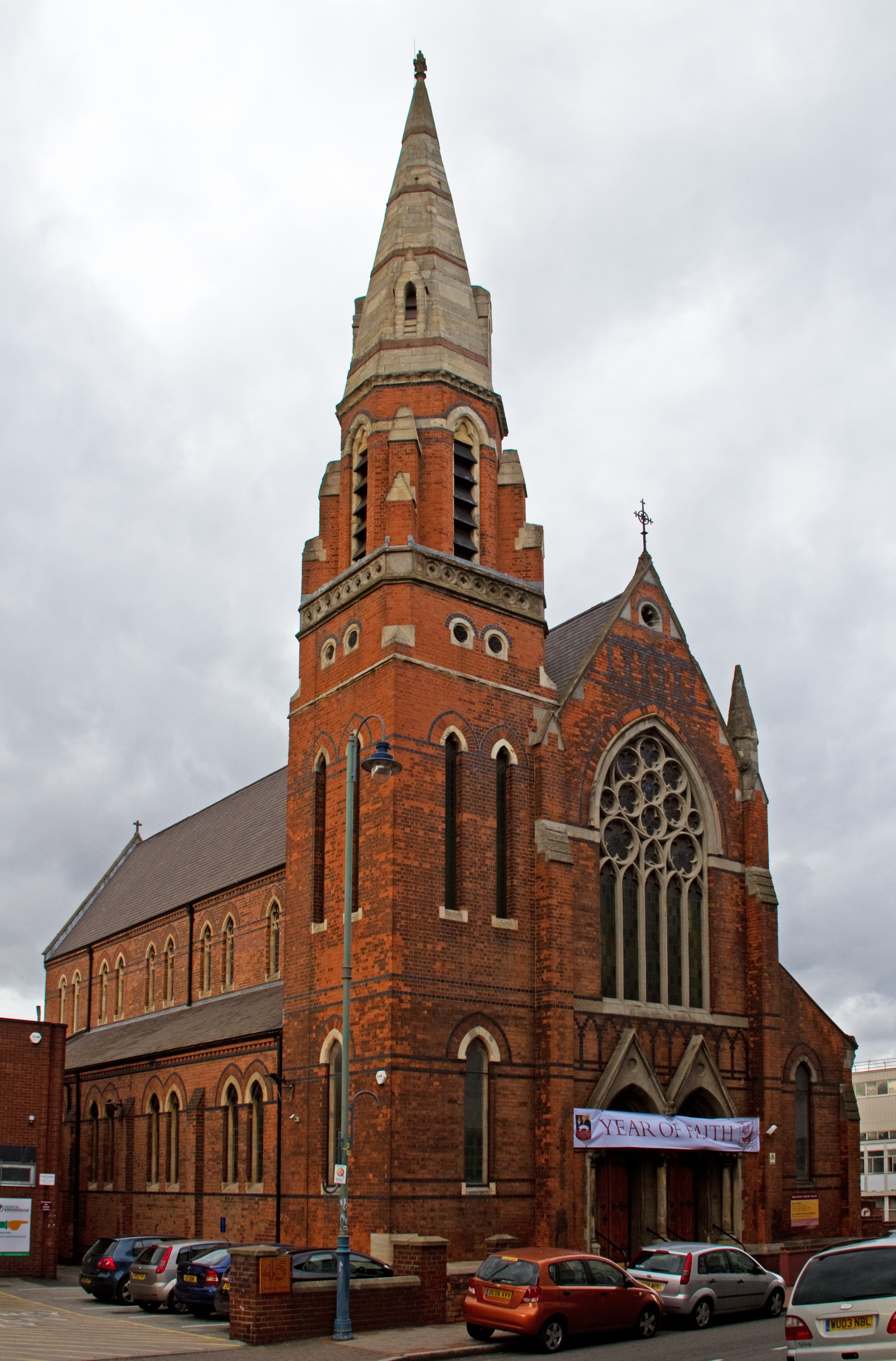
- Front Entrance

- Location in the West Midlands
- OS grid reference: SP 07951 86060
- Location: Digbeth, Birmingham
- Country: England
- Denomination: Roman Catholic
- Website: www.stannesbirmingham.com

History
- Status: Active
- Founded: 1849
- Founder: John Henry Newman
- Dedication: Saint Anne

Architecture
- Functional status: Parish church
- Heritage designation: Grade II listed
- Designated: 22 March 2021
- Architects: Albert Vicars; John O'Neill
- Style: Gothic Revival

Administration
- Archdiocese: Birmingham
- Deanery: Birmingham (Cathedral)

St Anne's Church is a Roman Catholic Parish church on Alcester Street in Digbeth, part of the city centre of Birmingham. It was founded by Saint John Henry Newman in 1849. It was moved to a new building in 1884 designed by London architects Albert Vicars and John O'Neill, who also designed St Hugh's Church in Lincoln, and helped design St Peter's Cathedral in Belfast.

The building is Grade II listed.

== History ==
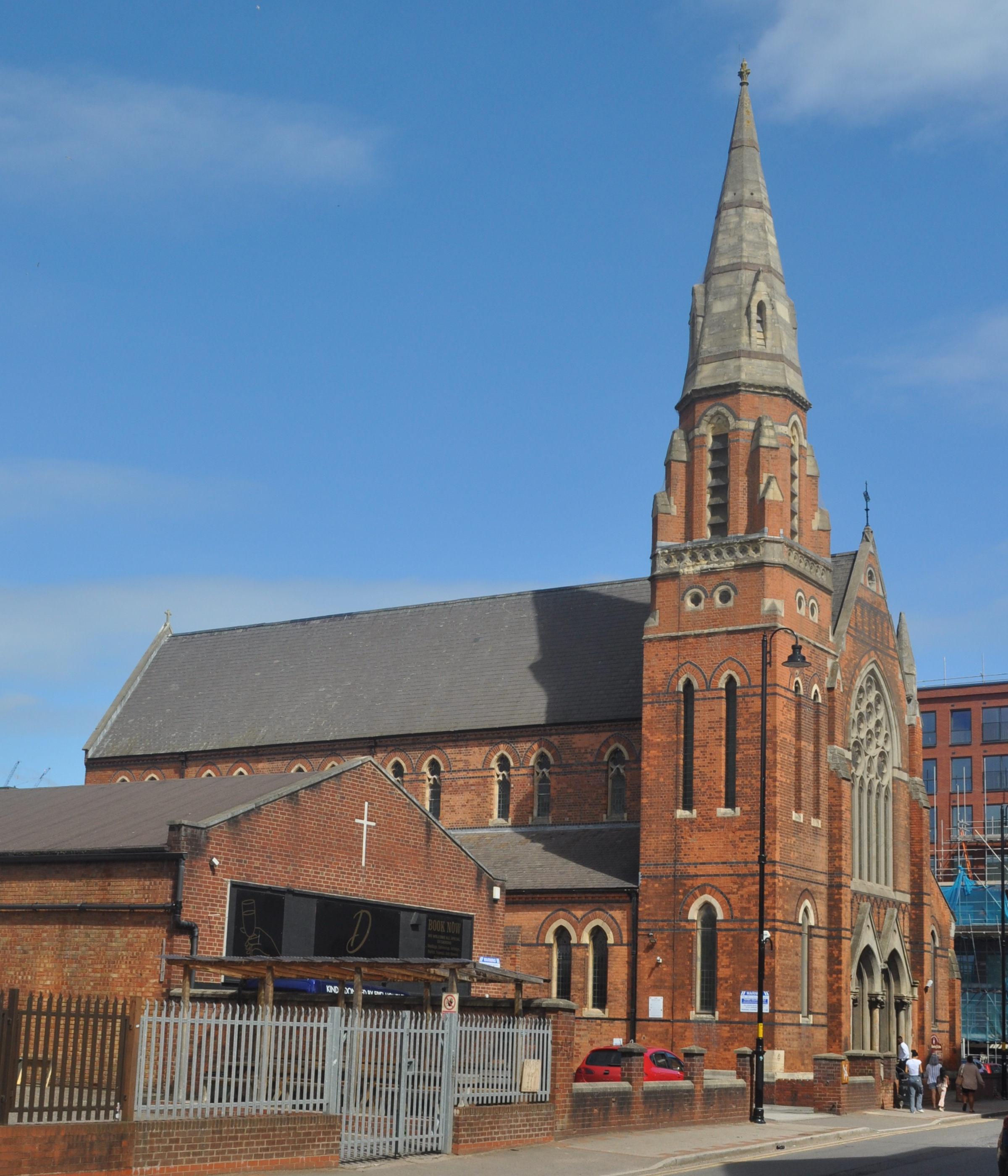
South side of the church and parish centre

=== Foundation ===
In 1847, John Henry Newman came back from Rome to Birmingham after getting permission from Pope Pius IX to create an Oratory of Saint Philip Neri in England. In 1849, he had gathered a group of followers and they initially founded the church in an old gin distillery in Deritend. The area contained poor housing, with many back-to-back rows of houses, intermixed with industry and suffering the social conditions that the country sought to remove decades later. The nature of the housing meant that it was mainly occupied by migrants, in this case workers from Ireland.

In 1852, Newman took his community to Edgbaston in Birmingham when construction of the Birmingham Oratory was completed. St Anne's Church continued, and was administered by the Archdiocese of Birmingham and is a part of it since then.

=== Construction ===
The Irish community continued to increase in Birmingham and Catholic churches were built to accommodate the expanding congregations. St Catherine of Siena Church was built on the Horse Fair in 1874 and St Francis of Assisi church was built in Handsworth in 1894.

In 1859, Fr John P. Dowling became the new parish priest. He provided the land upon which the church stands. In 1884, a new St Anne's church was built on Alcester Street, designed by the London architectural firm Vicars and O'Neill. It was opened by Cardinal Manning. The former distillery that John Henry Newman turned into a church became a school.

J. R. R. Tolkien worshipped at the church when he lived in Moseley and converted to Roman Catholicism in 1900.

=== Administration ===
In 1903, Canon Villiers replaced Fr Dowling. When he died on 19 October 1938, the Missionary Oblates of Mary Immaculate (OMI) took over administration of the church. They became involved after their provincial, Fr Michael Ryan OMI, met the Archbishop of Birmingham, Thomas Williams and said that the Oblates were interested in moving into the archdiocese if a parish was available for them to work in. After Canon Villiers died, a vacancy appeared and they served St Anne's Church.

In 2010, the Oblates handed the church back to the Archdiocese of Birmingham who continue to serve the parish.

== Parish ==
In 1952, the first Birmingham St Patrick's Day Parade was held. It goes right through the centre of the parish, along Deritend High Street and up to Digbeth. It happens on the Sunday before 17 March and it is the world's largest St Patrick's Day Parade after New York City and Dublin. The crowds reach as high as 80,000 spectators and there are up to 40 floats, groups and bands in the parade.

The church has a close relationship with the nearby St Anne's Primary School, whose mission statement says that, "At Saint Anne's we look to Jesus as our guide as we pray and learn, so that we can grow as friends together. Each one of us is special and we accept and respect one another as children of God.'

The church has three Sunday Masses every week. There is a Vigil Mass at 1:00 pm on Saturday, and Masses at 11:00 am and 6:30 pm on Sunday.

== List of parish priests ==
The priests in charge of the parish were:

- 1849 – 1852: Fr John Henry Newman
- 1852 – 1859: Fr J. Wise and Fr T. More
- 1859 – 1903: Fr John P Dowling
- 1903 – 1938: Very Rev Canon Villiers
- 1938 – 1942: Fr P Danagher OMI
- 1942 – 1952: Fr E Kenny OMI
- 1953 – 1959: Fr M Bagnall OMI
- 1959 – 1965: Fr D Bagnall OMI
- 1965 – 1971: Fr M Buckley OMI
- 1971 – 1975: Fr P Dillon OMI
- 1975 – 1979: Fr E McSherry OMI
- 1979 – 1985: Fr H Bromley OMI
- 1985 – 1987: Fr P Sheridan OMI
- 1987 – 1990: Fr S Hynes OMI
- 1990 – 1993: Fr M Phelan OMI
- 1993 – 1997: Fr E McMahon OMI
- 1997 – 1998: Fr M Ryan OMI
- 1998 – 2004: Fr C Murphy OMI
- 2004 – 2007: Fr K Thorson OMI
- 2007 – 2008: Fr M Ryan OMI
- 2008 – 2010: Fr C Murphy OMI
- 2010: Present Very Rev Mgr P Browne

== See also ==
- St Catherine of Siena Church, Birmingham
- St Francis of Assisi Church, Handsworth
- Birmingham Oratory
- John Henry Newman
- Missionary Oblates of Mary Immaculate
