= Albert Vicars =

Architect

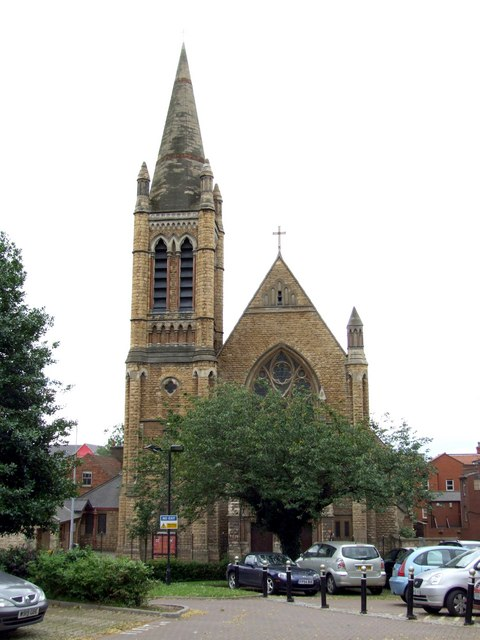
- St Hugh, Lincoln
- Born: 1840 ?Lincoln
- Died: 1896 (aged 55–56) ?London
- Education: Pupil of Michael Drury of Lincoln
- Occupation: Architect
- Practice: Vicars & O’Neill, Somerset Chambers, 151 Strand, London

Albert Vicars (1840–1896) was an architect who specialised in Catholic ecclesiastical architecture. He was articled to the Lincoln architect Michael Drury and later worked as an assistant to G.A. Dean. In about 1875 he formed a partnership with John O’Neill at Somerset Chambers, 151 Strand, London.

== Architectural work ==
=== Churches ===
- St Hugh, Monk's Road, Lincoln, 1891. Originally designed to be placed in Silver Street, Lincoln. Rock faced with steeple.
- St Marys Church, Compton Leek, Staffordshire, 1885.
- St Joseph, Highgate, London. The corner stone was laid on 24 May 1888 and the building opened on 21 November 1889. The church is in the Italian Romanesque style and was built to commemorate the Jubilee of Pope Leo XIII. Brother Alphonsus superintending the work.
- Our Lady of the Sacred Heart Roman Catholic Church, Herne Bay, 1889. Grade II listed in 2014.

=== Houses ===
- Bracebridge Hall, Lincoln, 1883. According to Pevsner, "A brash and chunky High Victorian pile arranged around an open yard. Gothic and asymmetrical… with and bell turett SW octagonal tower". Two lodges, one on the Brant Road with applied timber framing and fretted bargeboards.

== Literature ==
- Antram N (revised), Pevsner N & Harris J, (1989), The Buildings of England: Lincolnshire, Yale University Press.
- Antonia Brodie (ed), Directory of British Architects, 1834–1914: 2 Vols, British Architectural Library, Royal Institute of British Architects, 2001
