= Malcolm McMahon =

Catholic bishop

His Grace The Most Reverend Malcolm McMahon OP KC*HS
- Metropolitan Archbishop Emeritus of Liverpool
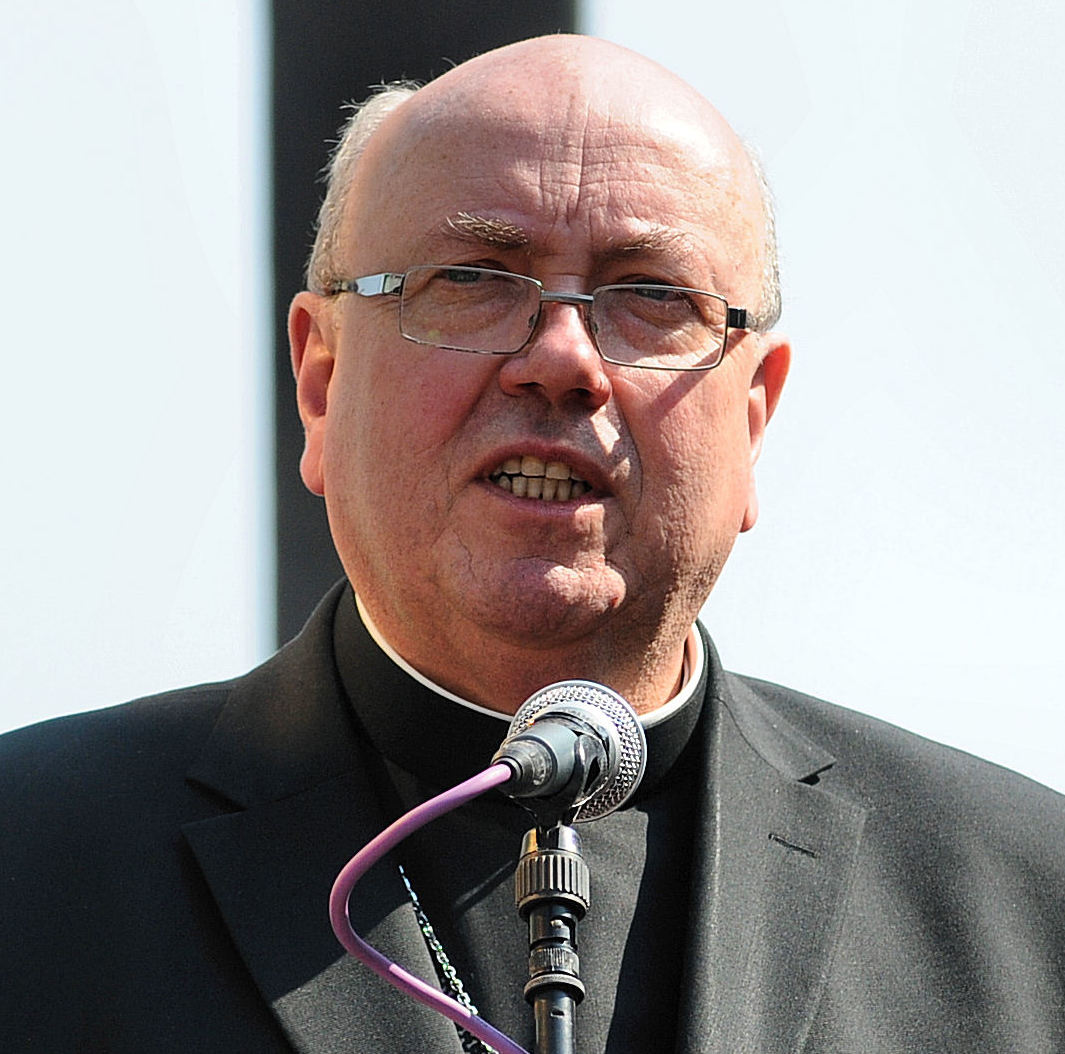
- McMahon pictured in 2011
- Church: Roman Catholic Church
- Archdiocese: Archdiocese of Liverpool
- Province: Province of Liverpool
- Appointed: 21 March 2014
- Installed: 1 May 2014
- Term ended: 5 April 2025
- Predecessor: Patrick Kelly
- Successor: John Sherrington
- Other posts: Chair of the Catholic Education Service (CES); Chair of the Board of Trustees of the Catholic Trust for England and Wales (CATEW); National President of Pax Christi; National Ecclesiastical Advisor to the Knights of Saint Columba
- Previous posts: Bishop of Nottingham (2000–2014); Prior of Blackfriars, Oxford (2000); Prior Provincial of the English Province of the Dominican Order (1992–2000)

Orders
- Ordination: 26 June 1982 by Basil Hume
- Consecration: 8 December 2000 by James Joseph McGuinness

Personal details
- Born: Malcolm Patrick McMahon; June 14, 1949 (age 77) London, England
- Denomination: Roman Catholic Church
- Residence: Archbishop's House, Salisbury Road, Liverpool
- Education: University of Manchester Institute of Science and Technology
- Motto: 'Non Nisi Te' (None but you, Lord)
- Coat of arms

Styles of Malcolm McMahon
- Reference style: The Most Reverend
- Spoken style: Your Grace
- Religious style: Archbishop

Malcolm Patrick McMahon, OP, KC*HS (born 14 June 1949) is an English Catholic prelate who served as Metropolitan Archbishop of Liverpool from 2014 to 2025. He was Bishop of Nottingham from 2000 to 2014. He is a member of the Dominican Order.

== Early life and ministry ==
Malcolm McMahon was born in London, the second of three brothers and studied mechanical engineering at the University of Manchester Institute of Science and Technology before working for London Transport. In 1976, he decided upon an ecclesiastical career and joined the Dominican Order. Making his religious profession in December 1977, McMahon studied philosophy at Blackfriars, Oxford and theology at Heythrop College. He was ordained to the priesthood by Cardinal Basil Hume on 26 June 1982.

He served as chaplain of Leicester Polytechnic for the 1986/7 academic year, whence he served in a London parish. McMahon later became Parish Priest of St Dominic's in Newcastle upon Tyne (1989), and of St Dominic's in Haverstock Hill (1990). He was elected prior provincial of the Dominicans' English Province in both 1992 and 1996. In 2000, he was elected prior of Blackfriars, Oxford.

== Episcopal career ==
=== Bishop of Nottingham ===
On 7 November 2000, McMahon was appointed Bishop of Nottingham by Pope John Paul II. He received his episcopal consecration on the following 8 December from Bishop James Joseph McGuinness, with Bishops Victor Guazzelli and Patrick O'Donoghue serving as co-consecrators, in the Cathedral Church of St. Barnabas.

McMahon's name had been mentioned as a possible successor to Cormac Murphy-O'Connor as Archbishop of Westminster and to Kevin McDonald as Archbishop of Southwark. He serves as Chair of the Department of Education and Formation of the Catholic Bishops' Conference of England and Wales, Chair of the Catholic Education Service, Chair of the Board of Trustees of the Catholic Trust of England & Wales, Ecclesiastical Advisor to the Knights of Saint Columba, and President of the British Section of Pax Christi, the international Catholic peace movement.

=== Archbishop of Liverpool ===
On 21 March 2014 Pope Francis appointed Bishop McMahon as the ninth Archbishop of the Metropolitan See of Liverpool. Archbishop McMahon was enthroned at Liverpool Metropolitan Cathedral of Christ the King on 1 May 2014, the Feast of Saint Joseph the Worker, before a congregation of three thousand.

During his tenure in Liverpool, in 2017 and 2018, Archbishop McMahon ordained priests for the Priestly Fraternity of Saint Peter in St Mary's Church, Warrington, utilising the pre-1970 rite of ordination.

Pope Francis accepted Archbishop McMahon's resignation on 5 April 2025.

== Views ==
Archbishop McMahon has said that there is no doctrinal reason preventing priests from having wives:

There is no reason why priests shouldn't be allowed to marry. It has always been a matter of discipline rather than doctrine[...]It is a question of justice for those men who want to be priests and to have a wife. Marriage should not bar them from their vocation but they must be married before they are ordained. The justice issue also applies to communities which could be deprived of the Eucharist because there aren't enough priests.

He considers clerical celibacy as a "spiritual necessity". In a pastoral letter read in the Diocese of Nottingham on Sunday 25 October 2009, then Bishop McMahon said:

Another aspect of priesthood that is often challenged is that of mandatory celibacy for our priests. Yet the celibate priesthood in the Roman Catholic Church has always been understood as a special gift that we should treasure. In our tradition, celibacy is not a mere external rule but a spiritual necessity.

He also supports the role of women in Catholic Church, but is against the ordination of women as priests:

I look forward to the day when women play a greater role in ministry and take up more of a place in the Church, but not in sacred orders.

In the same pastoral letter, Bishop McMahon said:

In the Mass, the Church follows the words of Christ himself when the bread and wine are consecrated; it has not made up these words, neither does the Church consider that it has the authority to make such a change. In a similar way only men are ordained in the Church because to ordain women would be to devise something that Christ did not institute.

In April 2010, Bishop McMahon appeared on the BBC's Hard Talk to discuss the Church's response to the sexual abuse of children. He defended the work of the Holy See and the Church in England and Wales on this and expressed the hope that the Vatican would become more open and transparent in its treatment of victims and perpetrators.

== Personal info ==
In his free time, the Archbishop enjoys playing golf and listening to live music and opera but also admits to being a fan of Norah Jones.

== Portrait ==
On 21 March 2017, Hardman Portrait published a portrait of McMahon to be displayed to the public in the Liverpool Metropolitan Cathedral Crypt. He is depicted in choir dress, mirroring the black and white portrait of his predecessor Archbishop Richard Downey. The portrait is one of a series of works depicting current members of Liverpool society alongside their predecessors.

Catholic Church titles
Preceded by James Joseph McGuinness	Bishop of Nottingham; 2000–2014	Succeeded by Patrick McKinney
Preceded by Patrick Kelly	Archbishop of Liverpool; 2014–2025	Succeeded by John Sherrington
