= Henry Bagshawe =

Henry Ridgard Bagshawe M.A., Q.C.
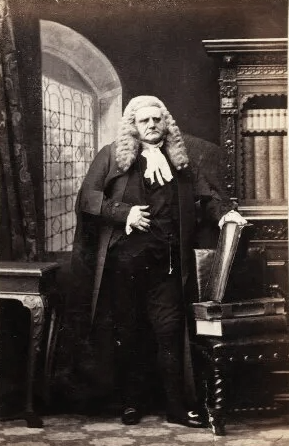
- Henry Bagshawe, 1863 photograph
- Born: 1799
- Died: 1870 (aged 70–71)
- Occupations: barrister, judge

Henry Ridgard Bagshawe (1799–1870) was an English barrister and judge. A Roman Catholic convert of 1834, he served as a managing editor of the Dublin Review from 1837 to 1863.

== Life ==
He was born at Brigg, the second son of nineteen children (fourteen of whom survived to adulthood) of Sir William Chambers Bagshawe, a physician, and his wife Helen, daughter of Nathaniel Ridgard, of Gainsborough, Lincolnshire. His father was originally surnamed "Darling", but inherited the Bagshawe family's landed property from a distant cousin- and assumed that name- because his maternal grandmother was of that family and the male line had died out. His elder brother William John, who inherited The Oakes, Sheffield, died in 1851. Bagshawe was educated at Oakham School, and at Richmond School under James Tate. He matriculated at Trinity College, Cambridge in 1817, graduating B.A. in 1821, M.A. in 1824.

In 1824 Bagshawe entered the Middle Temple, and he was called to the bar there the following year. He took silk in 1854. He built up a substantial chancery practice. In 1857 he took on Charles Russell as pupil.

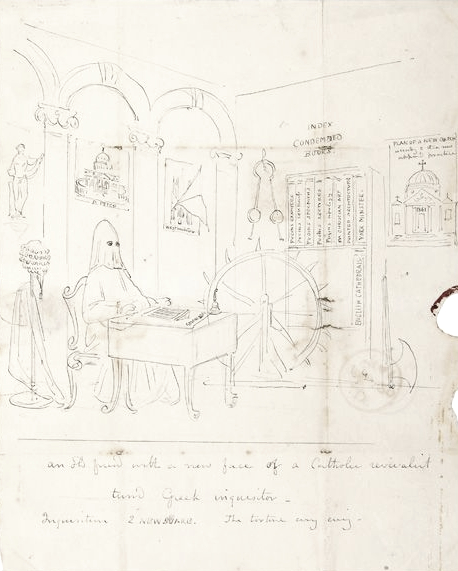
Sketch by A. W. N. Pugin in a letter of 1841 to his friend Henry Bagshawe, satirising Bagshawe's supposed judicial role in deciding between neo-classical and Gothic architecture for a new Lincoln's Inn Fields Catholic church in London

Bagshawe was received into the Roman Catholic Church at St Patrick's Church, Soho Square in 1834, by the Rev. Edward Norris. When Nicholas Wiseman was in London at the Sardinian Chapel in 1835–6, he stayed with Bagshawe.

In 1846, Bagshawe appeared before the Commissioners in Lunacy, on behalf of Helen Gladstone (1814–1880), younger sister of William Ewart Gladstone. He and his wife were close personal friends of Helen, a Catholic convert who had been taking opium, and confined in a Carlton Gardens house owned by her father Sir John Gladstone, 1st Baronet. Bagshawe's initial request, for an application to visit to be passed to the Lord Chancellor, was accepted by Lord Ashley. Shortly, however, Thomas Gladstone and his brother William contested the claims made that Helen was under some form of restraint. The application via the Commissioners did not proceed; but Helen left the house to stay with Catholic friends in Bath about a week later.

In 1861 Bagshawe was made a county court judge in west Wales (Cardigan, Carmarthen and Pembroke). In the wake of the Prison Ministers Act 1863 he was active in supporting the visiting rights of Catholic priests in Glamorgan jails in particular. There was substantial immigration to Glamorgan and Cardiff in the first half of the 19th century, from south-east Ireland and elsewhere. In 1861 his son had made an issue of religious education access to workhouses. In 1864 Bagshawe argued against a decision of the Board of Guardians in Swansea, where his wife and family had been making workhouse visits, to restrict entry to accredited ministers of religion; he obtained an amendment. Gilley comments on a family reputation for proselytism, as possibly counter-productive.

In 1868 Henry Bagshawe was also made a judge for the Clerkenwell District in London. He died at 21 Fellows Road in north-west London on 16 May 1870.

== Editor of the Dublin Review ==
Bagshawe's position at the Dublin Review has been described as "executive editor" or "managing director". He came in for issue #6 in 1837, issues #4 and #5 having been edited by James Smith (died 1866).

In 1839 Frederick Lucas, who wrote for the Dublin Review, was brought in as co-editor with Bagshawe. The arrangement lasted until 1842, when Lucas began to take an aggressive line towards the Review in The Tablet, his own publication. There was a hiatus in Bagshawe's editorship in the summer of 1858, while Lord Acton considered terms under which he might take over the Review. Bagshawe took executive decisions, but editorial policy was laid down by Wiseman and Charles William Russell. William George Ward took over in 1863.

== Family ==
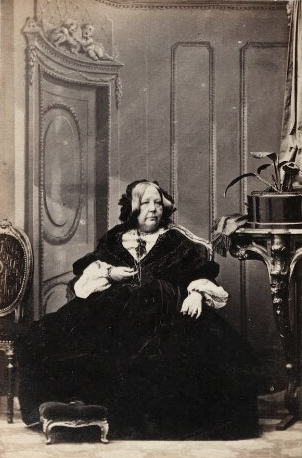
Catherine Elizabeth Bagshawe, 1863 photograph

Bagshawe married in 1824 Catherine Elizabeth Gunning, daughter of the army surgeon John Gunning (1773–1863), and his wife Catherine Gilpin. She is listed as a Catholic convert; and died in 1878 at age 75. Their children included:

- William Henry Gunning Bagshawe (1825–1901), barrister and judge, married 1861, Harriet Theresa Stanfield, daughter of Clarkson Stanfield. He was elevated as Q.C. in 1874. The painter Joseph Ridgard Bagshawe was their son. He was generally referred to as Henry Bagshawe, and his wife as Mrs. Henry Bagshawe, meaning confusion with his father is possible.
- John Bernard Bagshawe (1827–1901), Catholic priest.
- Edward Gilpin Bagshawe (1829–1915), Catholic bishop.
- Clement Walsh Bagshawe (1840–1901), fourth son, tea planter at Katlicherra, Assam, married in 1865 Elizabeth Melvill, daughter of Henry Melvill.
- Frederic(k) Gladstone Bagshawe, fifth and youngest son, married 1869 Emily Teresa Bolton, daughter of Thomas Bolton of Oaken Hall, Codsall.
- Catherine Helen, eldest daughter, died 1910 aged 83.
- Jane Edith, second daughter, died 1883.
- Mary Isabella, third daughter, married in 1857, at Muzaffarpur, Donald Horne Macfarlane.
- Catherine Monica, fourth daughter, married in 1870 Henry Latter of Ashford.
- Francesca Maria Sforza married in 1861, in Calcutta, the architect Christopher George Wray.
