= Roman Catholic Bishop of Nottingham =

Catholic bishopric in England

Bishop of Nottingham
- Bishopric

catholic
- Incumbent: Patrick McKinney

Location
- Ecclesiastical province: Westminster

Information
- First holder: Joseph Hendren
- Established: 29 September 1850
- Diocese: Nottingham
- Cathedral: Nottingham Cathedral

The Bishop of Nottingham is the Ordinary of the Roman Catholic Diocese of Nottingham in the Province of Westminster.

The diocese covers an area of 13,074 km^{2} (5,000 sq mi) and spans the counties of Derbyshire (excluding the High Peak and Chesterfield districts), Leicestershire, Lincolnshire, Nottinghamshire (excluding the district of Bassetlaw) and North Lincolnshire. The see is in the City of Nottingham, where the bishop's seat is at the Cathedral Church of St. Barnabas, Nottingham.

The Diocese of Nottingham was erected on 29 September 1850, mainly from the Vicariate Apostolic of the Central District, and partly from the Eastern District.

== List of the Bishops of the Roman Catholic Diocese of Nottingham, England ==
Roman Catholic Bishops of Nottingham
From	Until	Incumbent	Notes
1851	1853	Joseph William Hendren, O.F.M.	Previously Bishop of Clifton (1850–1851). Appointed Bishop of Nottingham on 22 June 1851 and installed on 2 December 1851. Resigned on 23 February 1853 and appointed Titular Bishop of Martyropolis. Died on 14 November 1866.
1853	1874	Richard Butler Roskell	Appointed bishop on 29 July 1853 and consecrated on 21 September 1853. Resigned in 1874 and appointed Titular Bishop of Abdera on 5 July 1875. Died on 27 January 1883.
1874	1902	Edward Gilpin Bagshawe, C.O.	Appointed bishop on 12 October 1874 and consecrated on 12 November 1874. Resigned on 18 January 1902. Appointed Titular Bishop of Hypaepa on 18 January 1902 and Titular Archbishop of Seleucia in Isauria on 17 January 1904. Died on 6 February 1915.
1902	1915	Robert Brindle	Appointed bishop on 6 December 1901 and installed on 2 January 1902. Resigned on 1 June 1915 and appointed Titular Bishop of Tacapae. Died on 27 June 1916.
1916	1931	Thomas Dunn	Appointed bishop on 3 January 1916 and consecrated on 25 February 1916. Died in office on 21 September 1931.
1932	1943	John Francis McNulty	Appointed bishop on 13 May 1932 and consecrated on 11 June 1932. Died in office on 8 June 1943.
1944	1974	Edward Ellis	Appointed bishop on 18 March 1944 and consecrated on 1 May 1944. Retired on 31 October 1974 and died on 6 July 1979.
1974	2000	James Joseph McGuinness	Appointed Coadjutor Bishop of Nottingham on 2 February 1972, consecrated on 23 March 1972. Succeeded Bishop of Nottingham on 31 October 1974. Retired on 7 November 2000 and died on 6 April 2007.
2000	2014	Malcolm Patrick McMahon, O.P.	Appointed bishop on 7 November 2000, consecrated on 8 December 2000. Installed as Archbishop of Liverpool on 1 May 2014
2015	-	Patrick Joseph McKinney	Appointed Bishop of Nottingham by Pope Francis on 14 May 2015; consecrated on 3 July 2015.
