= Edward Bagshawe (bishop) =

English Catholic prelate (1829-1915)

- Bishop of Nottingham
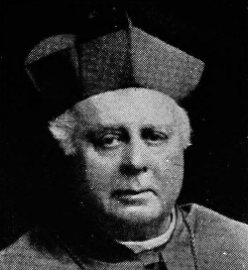
- Diocese: Nottingham
- See: Nottingham
- Installed: 1874
- Term ended: 1901
- Predecessor: Richard Roskell
- Successor: Robert Brindle

Orders
- Ordination: 1852
- Consecration: 12 November 1874 by Archbishop Henry Manning

Personal details
- Born: 12 January 1829 London, United Kingdom
- Died: 6 February 1915 (aged 86) Hounslow, United Kingdom
- Denomination: Roman Catholic
- Parents: H. R. Bagshawe
- Education: St. Mary's College, Oscott

Edward Gilpin Bagshawe (12 January 1829 – 6 February 1915) was an English Catholic prelate who served as the third Bishop of Nottingham.

== Life ==
Bagshawe was born in London, 12 January 1829, the son of Henry Ridgard Bagshawe, a Judge of County Courts in Wales, and a convert to Catholicism. His eldest brother William became King's Counsel and like his father a county court judge. His elder brother John was a chaplain in the Crimea, and later, rector of St. Elizabeth's in Richmond.

Edward took his B.A. at University College School in London and in 1838 entered St. Mary's College, Oscott. Upon graduation, he had planned to work in law, but instead joined the Brompton Oratory in 1849 and was ordained a priest in 1852. He gave lectures on Christian Doctrine at the Training School in Hammersmith. Some forty years later, he refined and published them as Notes on Christian Doctrine.

On 12 November 1874, Bagshawe was consecrated Bishop of Nottingham at the Brompton Oratory by Archbishop Manning. In his first Ad Limina report, Bagshawe stated that in his first six months he had visited twenty of forty-eight missions, six of which did not have their own pastor due to a shortage of priests. On 17 November 1892, he laid the foundation stone for St Hugh's Church, Lincoln.

Bagshawe was involved, along with Bishop Vaughn of Salford in the bishops committee that produced the 1886 Manual of Prayers for Congregational Use. In 1900 he translated and issued The Breviary Hymns and Missal Sequences in English Verse. The reviewer in The Month gave it a favourable review, while noting that it was a more literal translation than John Henry Newman's more poetic one. He published a number of hymn books, and was a contributor to the Catholic Encyclopedia.

Between July and early November 1901, three of Bagshawe's brothers died. He resigned in 1901 due to his own failing health. He then served as chaplain to the Sisters of the Little Company of Mary, residing in Hounslow.

He was appointed titular bishop of Hypaepa in 1902, and titular archbishop of Seleucia in 1904. He was styled Bishop Emeritus of Nottingham, and officiated at the Chrism Mass on Holy Thursday at Westminster Cathedral in 1904, when Archbishop Bourne fell ill of a serious cold on Palm Sunday.

Edward Bagshawe died at Gunnersbury House in Hounslow on 6 February 1915.

The Annunciation window in the chapel of the English Martyrs Catholic School in Leicester is a memorial to Bishop Bagshawe.

Religious titles
Preceded by Richard Roskell	Bishop of Nottingham; 1874–1901	Succeeded by Robert Brindle
