= Thomas Dunn (bishop) =

English prelate (1870-1931)

- Bishop of Nottingham
- See: Nottingham
- In office: 25 February 1916– 21 September 1931
- Predecessor: Robert Brindle
- Successor: John Francis McNulty

Orders
- Ordination: 2 February 1893

Personal details
- Born: 28 July 1870 Marylebone, London
- Died: 21 September 1931 (aged 61) Nottingham

Thomas Dunn (28 July 1870 – 21 September 1931) was an English prelate of the Roman Catholic Church. He served as the fifth Bishop of Nottingham from 1916 until his death in 1931.

== Life ==
Born in Marylebone, London on 28 July 1870, he was ordained to the priesthood on 2 February 1893 at Westminster, after which he acted as chaplain at the Visitation at Harrow. In 1895 he was appointed a Private Chamberlain, was made chancellor of Westminster in 1902. In 1906 Dunn was made rector at Staines.

On 3 January 1916, Dunn was appointed the fifth Bishop of Nottingham by Pope Benedict XV. He received his episcopal consecration on the following 25 February from Cardinal Francis Bourne, Archbishop of Westminster, with Bishops Peter Amigo of Southwark and William Cotter of Portsmouth serving as co-consecrators.

Dunn found a rapidly growing diocese and encouraged church building on an unprecedented scale. The first stone of the Church of the Holy Spirit in West Bridgford was laid by Bishop Thomas Dunn in 1929. He introduced the daily recitation of the Divine Office by the Cathedral clergy and gave a more prominent place to the use of plainchant in the liturgy. In 1918, the Xavierian brothers established their novitiate at Deeping St James. The following year the Capuchins transferred the Seraphic college from Cowley to Panton Hall. Towards the end of his tenure, the diocese acquired Padley Chapel as a pilgrimage center.

Dunn died in office on 21 September 1931, aged 61, and is buried in the Cathedral Church of St. Barnabas.

Catholic Church titles
| Preceded by Robert Brindle | Bishop of Nottingham; 1916–1931 | Succeeded by John Francis McNulty |
