= Nottingham Cathedral =

Coordinates: 52°57′17″N 1°09′26″W

- Saint Barnabas' Cathedral, Nottingham
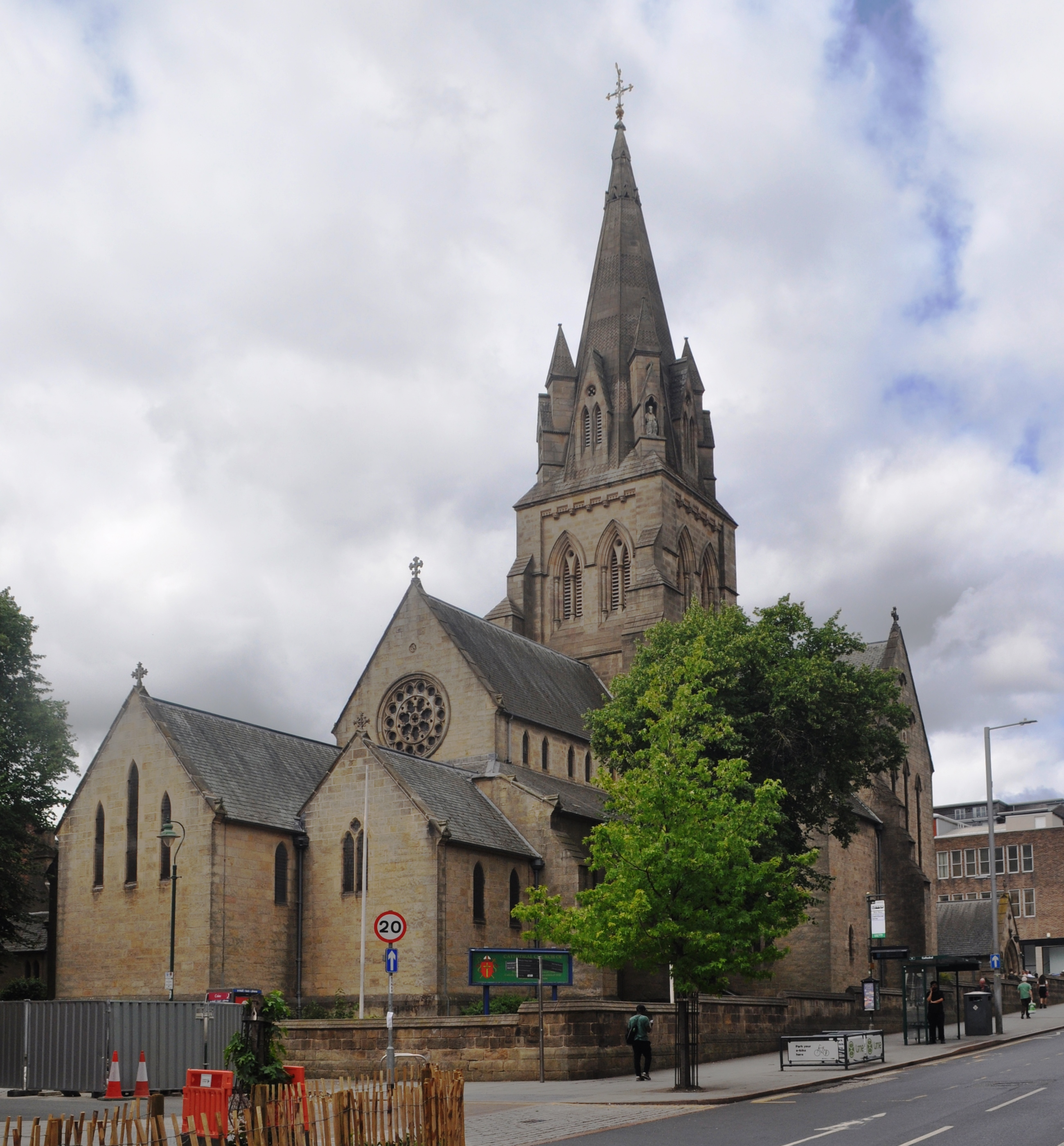

- Shown in Nottingham
- OS grid reference: SK 56720 40028
- Location: North Circus Street, Nottingham, NG1 5AE
- Country: England
- Denomination: Roman Catholic
- Website: stbarnabascathedral.org.uk

Architecture
- Architect: Augustus Welby Northmore Pugin
- Style: Neo-Gothic
- Years built: 1841–1844

Specifications
- Height: 150 feet (46 m)

Administration
- Province: Westminster
- Diocese: Nottingham

Clergy
- Bishop: Patrick McKinney
- Dean: Malachy Brett

The Cathedral Church of St. Barnabas is a cathedral of the Roman Catholic Church in the city of Nottingham in Nottinghamshire, England. It is the mother church of the Diocese of Nottingham and seat of the Bishop of Nottingham. The cathedral is a grade-II* listed building.

== Location ==
It is located on the corner of Derby Road and North Circus Street, on the opposite side of which are the Albert Hall and the Nottingham Playhouse (Wellington Circus).

== History ==
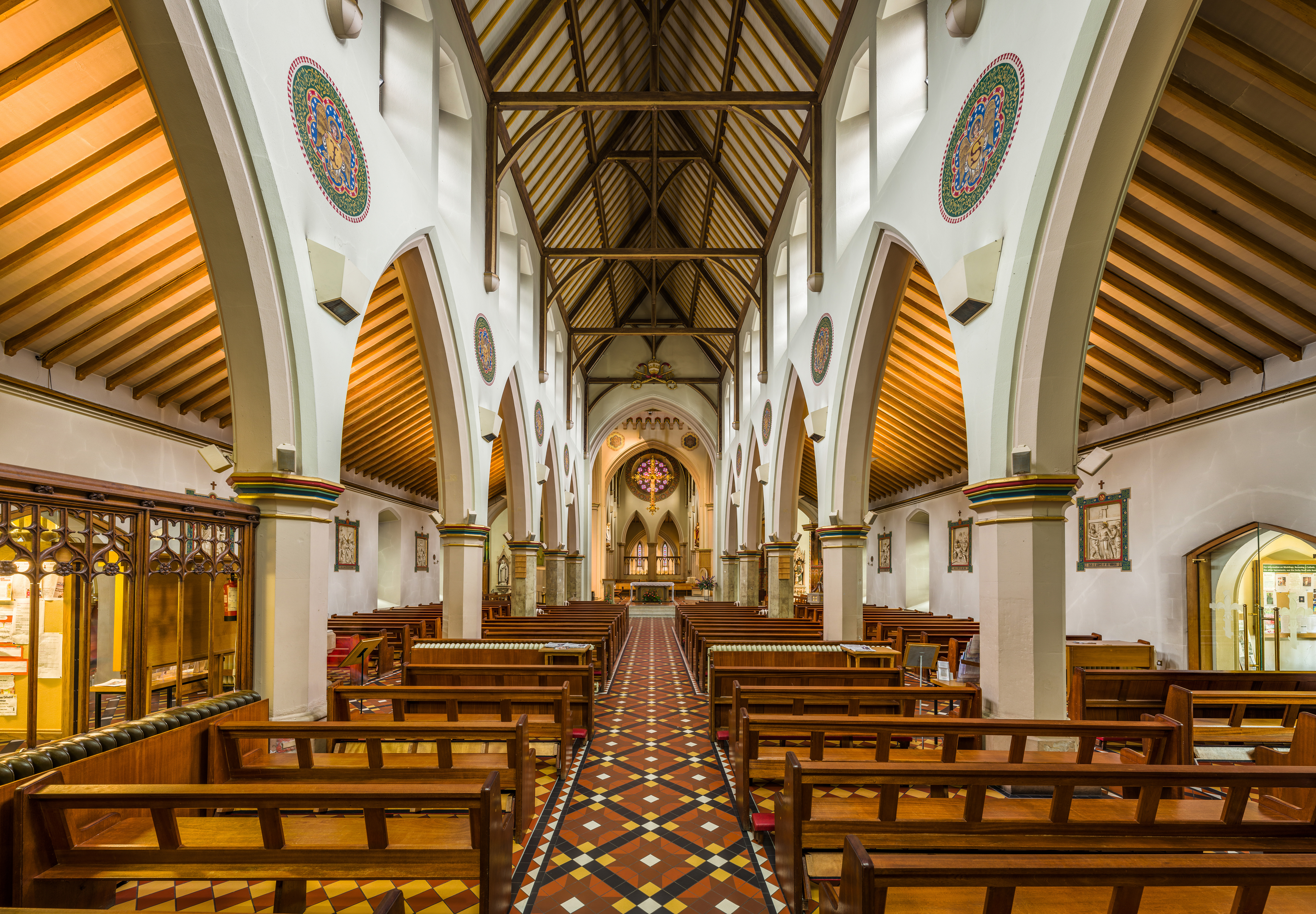
The nave looking east

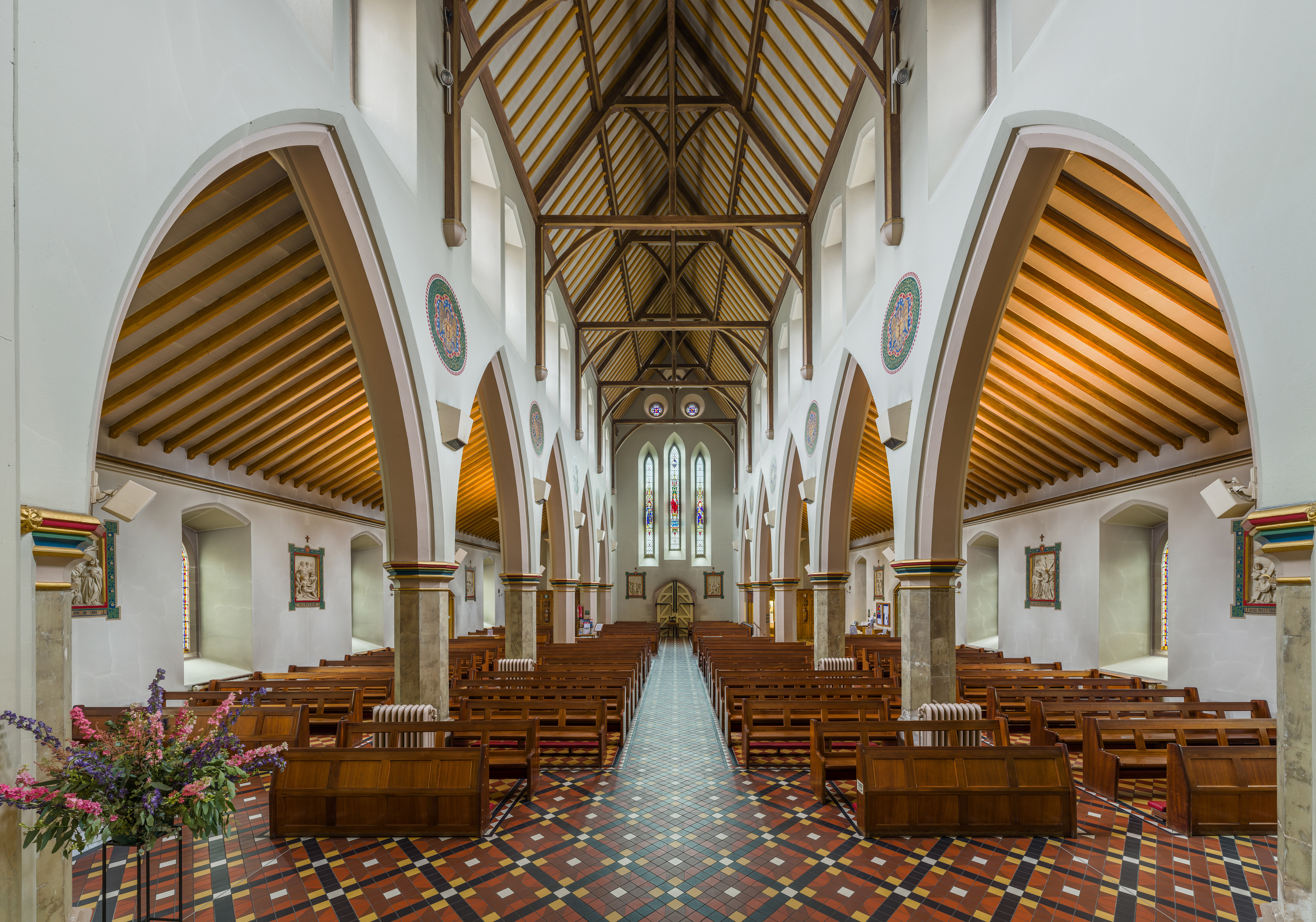
The nave looking west

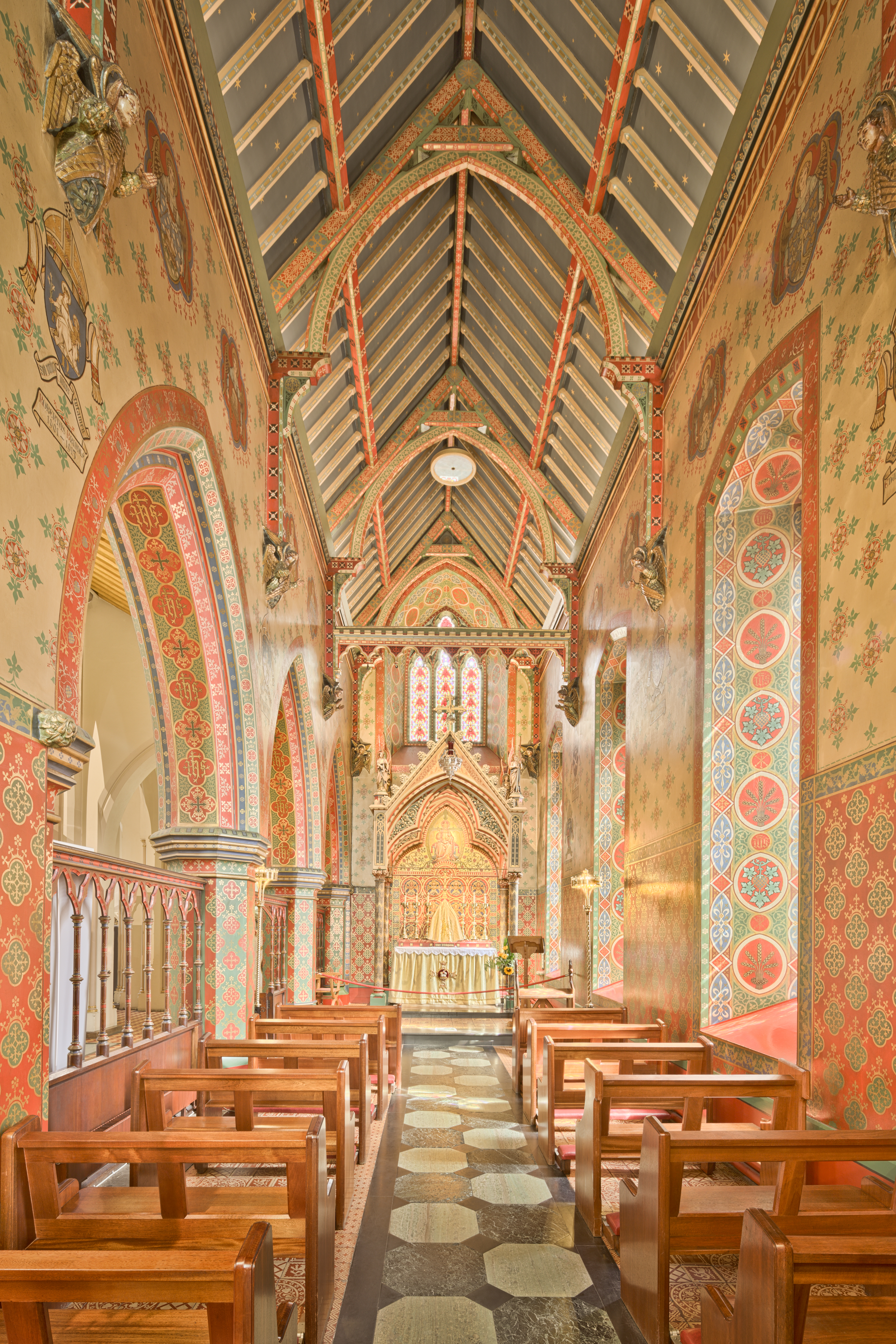
The Blessed Sacrament Chapel

It was built between 1841 and 1844, costing £15,000 (equivalent to £1,650,000 in 2025), and was first consecrated in 1844, fifteen years after the Roman Catholic Relief Act 1829 ended most restrictions on Catholicism in the United Kingdom. A substantial amount of the cost was paid by the important Catholic Lord Shrewsbury. The architect was Augustus Welby Northmore Pugin who also designed the interior of The Houses of Parliament. It was built in the Early English Plain Gothic style, although in contrast, the Blessed Sacrament Chapel was richly decorated and Pugin's later churches were built in that Decorated Gothic style throughout. Pugin was retained as architect by Rev Robert William Willson, then priest in charge of Nottingham. In 1842 he was named as Bishop-Elect of Hobart, Tasmania, and had to leave the work in Nottingham before completion.

Upon completion, the cathedral was the largest Catholic church built in England since the Reformation. Bishop Wiseman brought relics of St Barnabas from Rome to be included in the altar stone of the high altar.

Following the establishment of a new Catholic hierarchy in England and Wales in 1850 by the decree of Pope Pius IX, it was raised to cathedral status in 1852, becoming one of the first four Catholic cathedrals in England and Wales since the English Reformation. It is the seat of the Bishop of Nottingham.

The cathedral is a Grade II* listed building of the lancet style of architecture Most of Pugin's decorative scheme was destroyed in the upheaval that surrounded the Second Vatican Council, when the old high altar was discarded, and most of the painted decoration smothered and painted plain. Other fittings removed at this time include the old cathedra, as well as the figures of St Mary and St John from the rood screen (the figures were reinstated in 1993). Buildings of England wrote: 'The whole effect could hardly be further from the richness of decoration and atmosphere that Pugin intended'. A fragment of the scheme is preserved in the Blessed Sacrament chapel, and is the highlight of the interior. The replacement high altar from the 1960s was replaced again in 1993 with one in a more sympathetic style. Fragments of Pugin's decoration, such as the roundels in the nave, were uncovered and restored, but most remains lost.

Another prominent feature of the cathedral is the tomb of Venerable Mary Potter, who founded the Little Company of Mary in Nottingham. The tomb was designed by Smith & Roper.

In September 2022, it was announced that the cathedral was embarking on a project to restore some of the original planned designs by A W N Pugin. This will involve uncovering the whitewash which covers the original decoration of the Lady Chapel. The project is a joint enterprise between Nottingham Cathedral, Nottingham Trent University, and Culture Syndicates. It is being supported by a grant from the National Lottery Heritage Fund.

The clergy of the cathedral also serve the church of St. Augustine on Woodborough Road.

== Cathedral music ==
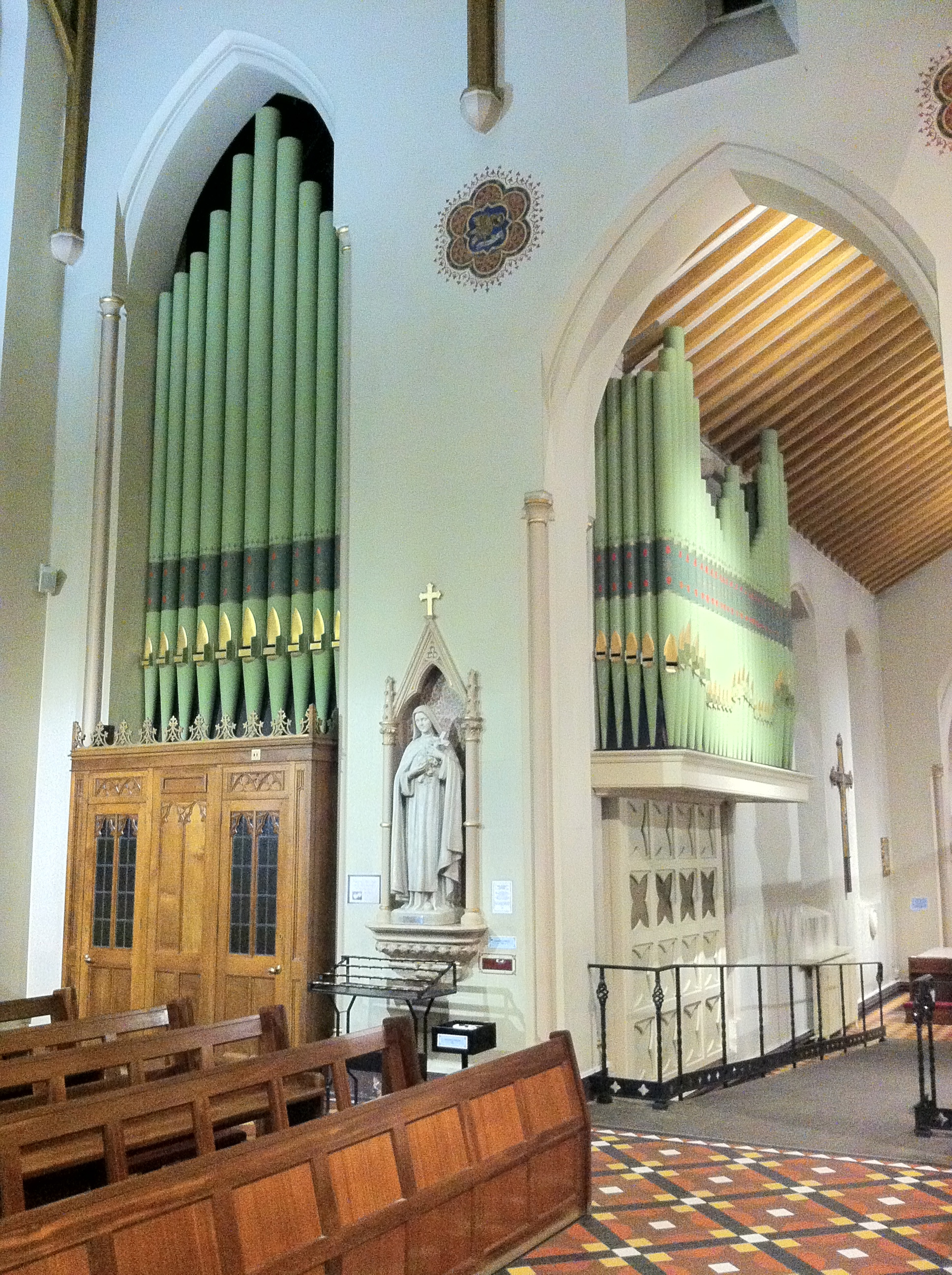
The organ

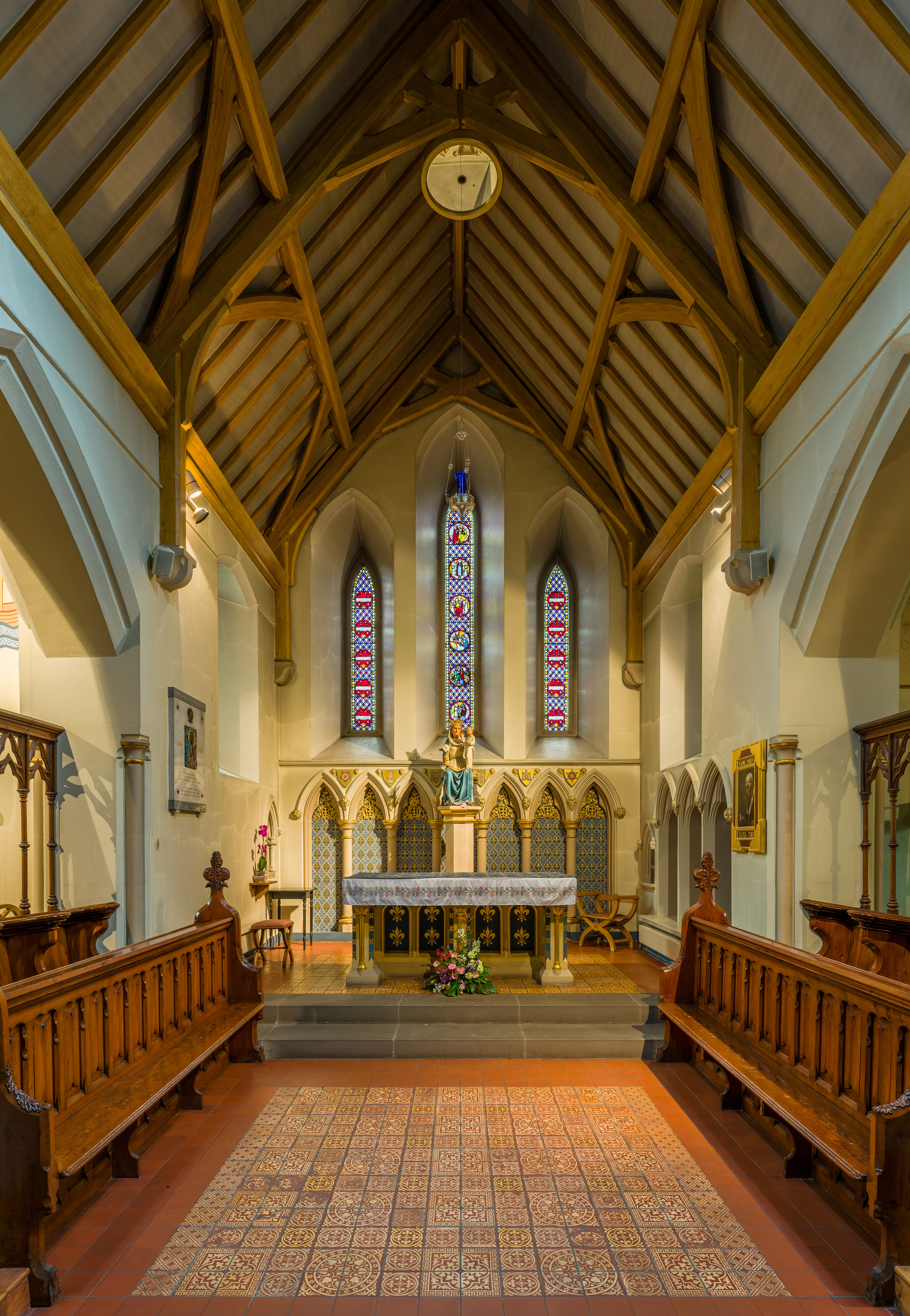
The Chapel of Our Lady

The cathedral's choral scholarships are available to students above or of eighteen years of age who are in full-time tertiary education in the Nottingham area.

=== List of Directors of Music ===
- Edmund Hart Turpin 1850 – 1865
- James Turpin 1866 – 1873 (afterwards organist of Londonderry Cathedral)
- William George Taylor 1874 – 1885 – 1898 – 1905
- William Francis Taylor 1905 – 1963
- Peter Smedley 1964 – 2003
- Neil Page 2003 – 2014
- Alex Patterson 2014 – 2020
- Gregory Treloar 2020 - 2025
- Peter Siepmann 2025-

=== Assistant Directors of Music / Organists ===
- Peter Smedley 1954 – 1964
- Christopher Burton 2008 – 2010
- Paul Hayward 2011 – 2012
- Alex Patterson 2012 – 2014
- Eden Lavelle 2016 – 2017
- Eleanor Martin 2019 – 2020
- Neil Page 2020 - 2025

== See also ==
- Grade II* listed buildings in Nottinghamshire
- Listed buildings in Nottingham (Radford and Park ward)
