= James McGuinness (bishop) =

- Bishop of Nottingham
- Church: Catholic Church
- Diocese: Diocese of Nottingham
- In office: 31 October 1974 – 7 November 2000
- Predecessor: Edward Ellis
- Successor: Malcolm McMahon
- Previous posts: Titular Bishop of Sanctus Germanus (1972-1974); Coadjutor Bishop of Nottingham (1972-1974)

Orders
- Ordination: 3 June 1950
- Consecration: 23 March 1972 by Edward Ellis

Personal details
- Born: James Joseph McGuinness; 2 October 1925 Derry, Northern Ireland, United Kingdom
- Died: 6 April 2007 (aged 81) Ednaston, Ashbourne, Derbyshire, United Kingdom

James Joseph McGuinness (2 October 1925 – 6 April 2007) served as the eighth Roman Catholic bishop of Nottingham from 1974 to 2000.

== Priestly ministry ==
He was born in Derry City, Northern Ireland, he was educated at St Columb's College, Derry, and the seminaries at Carlow College, and St. Mary's, Oscott . He was ordained priest on 3 June 1950, aged 24, for the Diocese of Nottingham by Bishop Edward Ellis.

He served as bishop's secretary and eventually vicar general in the diocese.

== Episcopal ministry ==
On 2 February 1972, McGuinness was appointed coadjutor bishop of Nottingham and titular bishop of Sanctus Germanus by Pope Paul VI. He received his episcopal consecration on the following 23 March. On 31 October 1974, he succeeded to become Bishop of Nottingham, where he remained until his retirement in 2000.

In 1980 the Diocese of Hallam was created and Bishop McGuinness contributed sixteen parishes from his diocese in north Nottinghamshire and Derbyshire to the new diocese.

An obituary noted that McGuinness served as Chairman of the National Youth Conference in his early years at the Bishops’ Conference and "played a great part in the visit of Pope John Paul II to Great Britain in 1982."

He died on 6 April 2007, aged 81 and is buried in St Barnabas Cathedral, Nottingham.
