= Richard Roskell =

Second Roman Catholic Bishop of Nottingham

Richard Butler Roskell (15 August 1817 – 27 January 1883) was the second Bishop of the Roman Catholic Diocese of Nottingham.

Richard Butler Roskell was born in Gateacre, near Liverpool 15 August 1817. On 20 July 1825, he was placed at St. Cuthbert's College, Ushaw. On leaving Ushaw in 1832, he went to Rome to continue his studies and was ordained a priest on 9 June 1840, aged 22, by Bishop Nicholas Wiseman, then Coadjutor Vicar Apostolic of the Midland District.

From Rome, he went on the English mission and was assigned to St. Patrick's in Manchester. He became provost to the Cathedral Chapter at Salford, and served as vicar-general to Bishop Turner. On 29 July 1853, aged 36, he was appointed Bishop of Nottingham and consecrated bishop on 21 September 1853 in Nottingham by Nicholas Wiseman, by then Cardinal Archbishop of Westminster.

On 5 July 1875, aged 57, he resigned as Bishop of Nottingham due to failing health and was appointed Titular Bishop of Abdera. He retired to Whitewell, where he died at the age of 65.

The episcopal motto Roskell chose was: Ros coeli, (Heaven's dew), a reminder of the Latin hymn Rorate coeli, but moreover an allusion to his last name: Ros-kell.

He was a priest for 42 years and a bishop for 29 years.
