= Kingerby Castle =

Manor house in Lincolnshire, England

- Market Rasen, Lincolnshire, England
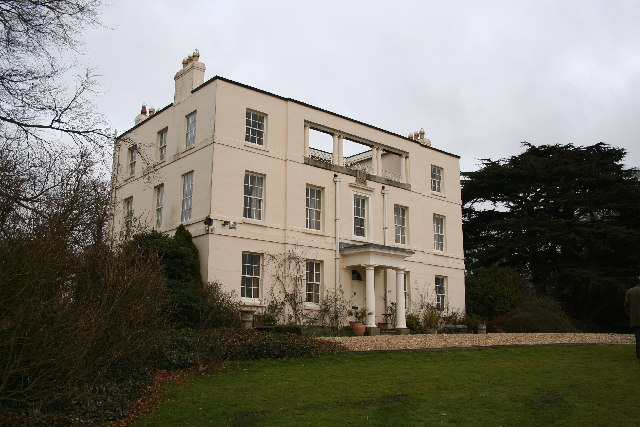
- The early 19th century Kingerby Hall, built on the site of Kingerby Castle

Site information
- Type: Motte and bailey
- Condition: Destroyed, replaced by manor house and later house

Location
- Shown within Lincolnshire
- Coordinates: 53.4214°N 0.4124°W
- Grid reference: grid reference TF056928

Kingerby Castle was in the small settlement of Kingerby some five miles north-west of Market Rasen, Lincolnshire.

It was a motte and bailey castle which was burnt down in 1216 by King John of England, before being fully destroyed in December 1218. The motte was then altered to form a platform for a manor house which was built on the site. In 1812 the manor house was demolished and replaced by Kingerby Hall, which still stands on the site.

== See also ==
- Castles in Great Britain and Ireland
- List of castles in England
- St Peter's Church, Kingerby
