= Cathedral of St John the Evangelist, Portsmouth =

Coordinates: 50°48′1″N 1°5′39″W

St John the Evangelist, Portsmouth
- Cathedral Church of St John the Evangelist
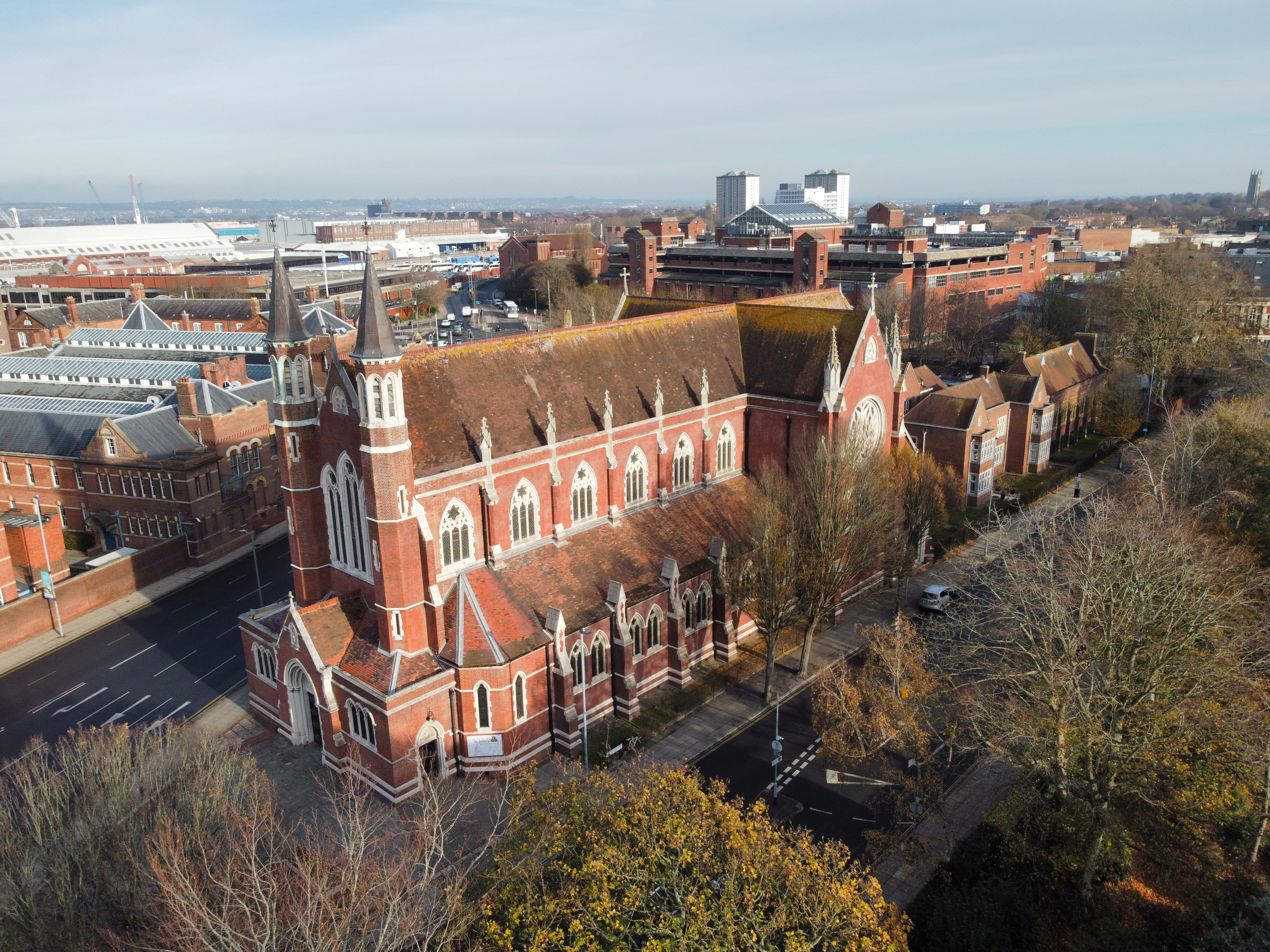

- Shown within Hampshire
- OS grid reference: SU 63923 00478
- Location: Portsmouth, Hampshire
- Country: England
- Denomination: Roman Catholic
- Website: portsmouth catholiccathedral.org.uk

History
- Status: Cathedral
- Consecrated: 1882

Architecture
- Functional status: Active
- Heritage designation: Grade II
- Designated: 10 January 1953
- Architect: Joseph Hansom
- Style: Gothic Revival
- Years built: 1882

Administration
- Province: Southwark
- Diocese: Portsmouth

Clergy
- Archbishop: John Wilson
- Bishop: Philip Egan
- Dean: Canon James McAuley
- Priest: Ryan Browne

The Cathedral Church of St John the Evangelist (also known as St John's Cathedral) is a Roman Catholic cathedral in Portsmouth, Hampshire, England. It is the mother church of the Portsmouth diocese and seat of the Bishop of Portsmouth, currently the Right Reverend Philip Egan. It was dedicated on 10 August 1882.

The cathedral is one of two cathedral churches in the city, the other being the Church of England Cathedral Church of St Thomas which is located about one mile to the south.

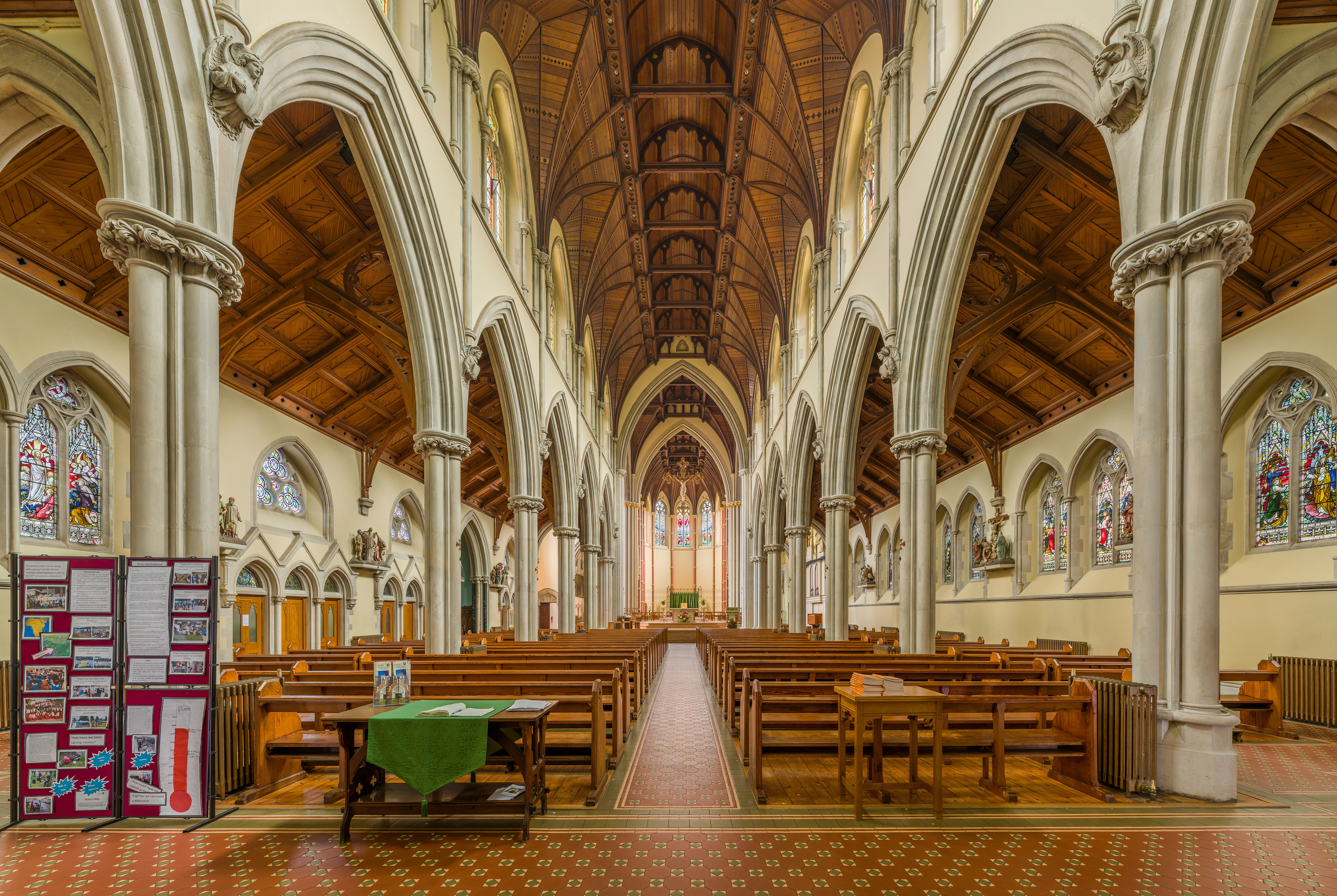
The Nave of the cathedral

== History ==
In 1791, Rev. John Cahill was assigned to Portsmouth and held services in a private house. A chapel was opened in Prince George Street in 1796 by Rev. Joseph Knapp. As a garrison town with an increasing number of Catholics, a larger space was needed. In 1877 Rev. John Horan purchased land from the War Department and hired architect John Crawley. Construction started in 1879, thanks to a donation from the Duke of Norfolk. It was opened in 1882 and is the first cathedral to have been built in Portsmouth.

When the Diocese of Portsmouth was formed in May 1882, St. John's was named the cathedral. The cathedral was consecrated by the first bishop of the new diocese, John Vertue, on 29 March 1887. He enlarged the cathedral and completed its interior decorations. He built an episcopal residence and a large hall adjoining, which, with the cathedral, form a group of buildings artistic in design, and architecturally, a most noteworthy structure, among the ecclesiastical buildings in the city of Portsmouth.

The Bishop's House next door to the cathedral was destroyed on 10 January 1941 by a high explosive bomb. While the main structure of the cathedral itself was mostly unharmed, all the stained glass except for the rose window in the south transept was damaged or destroyed. The Bishop's House was rebuilt, although Archbishop John Henry King never moved into it. The war damage to the cathedral itself was gradually repaired in the years following the war, with work being finally completed in the early 1960s. A statue of Saint John by Philip Jackson was placed outside the Cathedral in 2010.

== Architecture ==
The cathedral was designed in Gothic Revival style by John Crawley in 1877–1881. Crawley died just as building started and his partner Joseph Hansom took over the project and modified the design, working on it until 1896. The church is built of Fareham Red Brick with Portland stone dressings. In 1900, John Cahill succeeded Vertue as Bishop of Portsmouth. Cahill completed the cathedral by adding the west front; the bell towers, designed by Canon Alexander Scoles, were added in 1906. The last new addition to be built was St Patrick's Chapel in 1924 by the Irish-born Bishop Timothy Cotter. The cathedral lacks a spire due to unsuitable ground conditions.

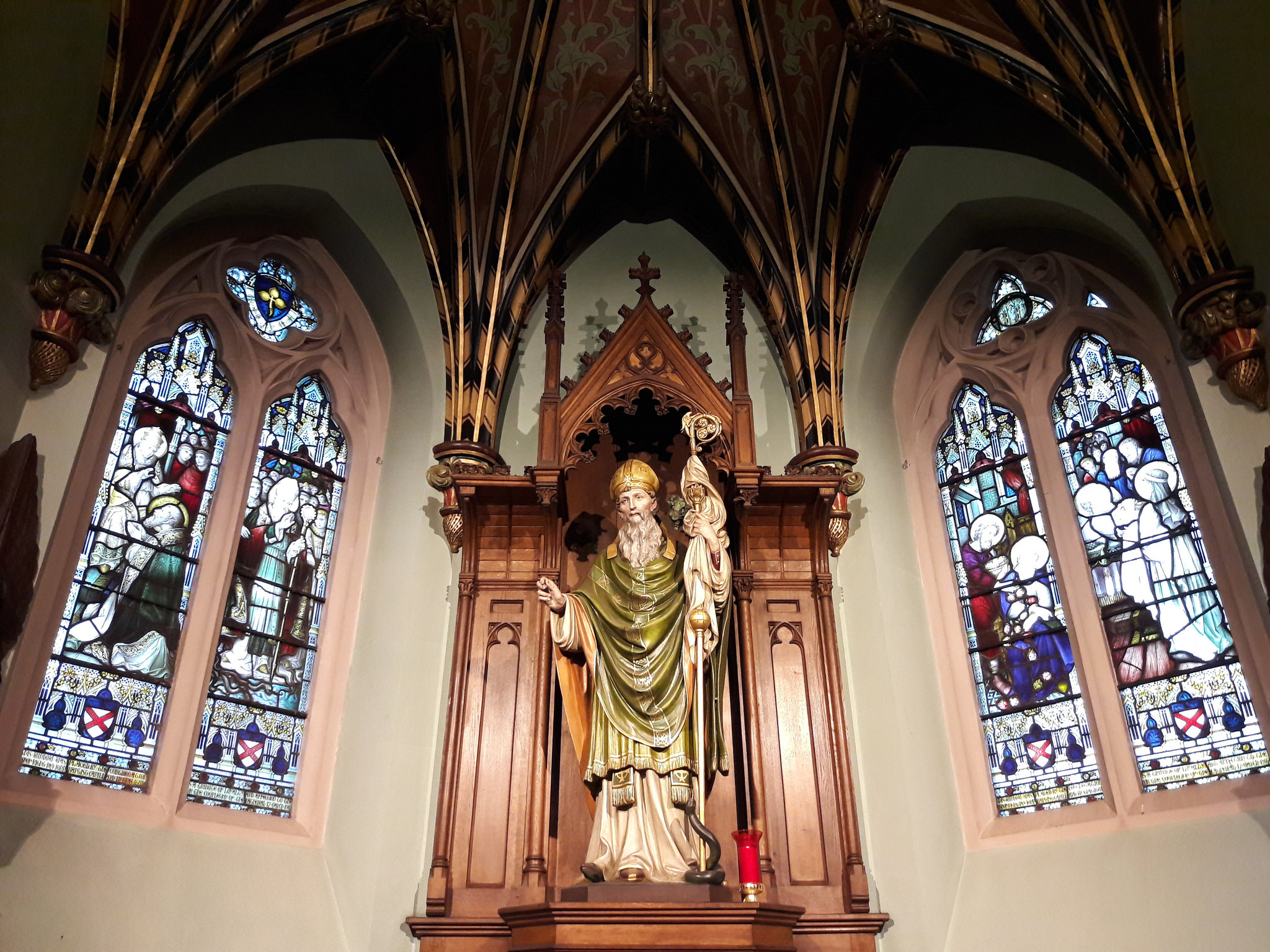
St. Patrick's Chapel

A memorial chapel dedicated to Our Lady Immaculate and St Edmund of Abingdon, patrons of the Diocese of Portsmouth, was created at the east end of the north aisle in memory of Bishop Vertue. A bronze statue of St John the Evangelist by sculptor Philip Jackson was unveiled in 2010 and stands eight feet tall outside the cathedral.

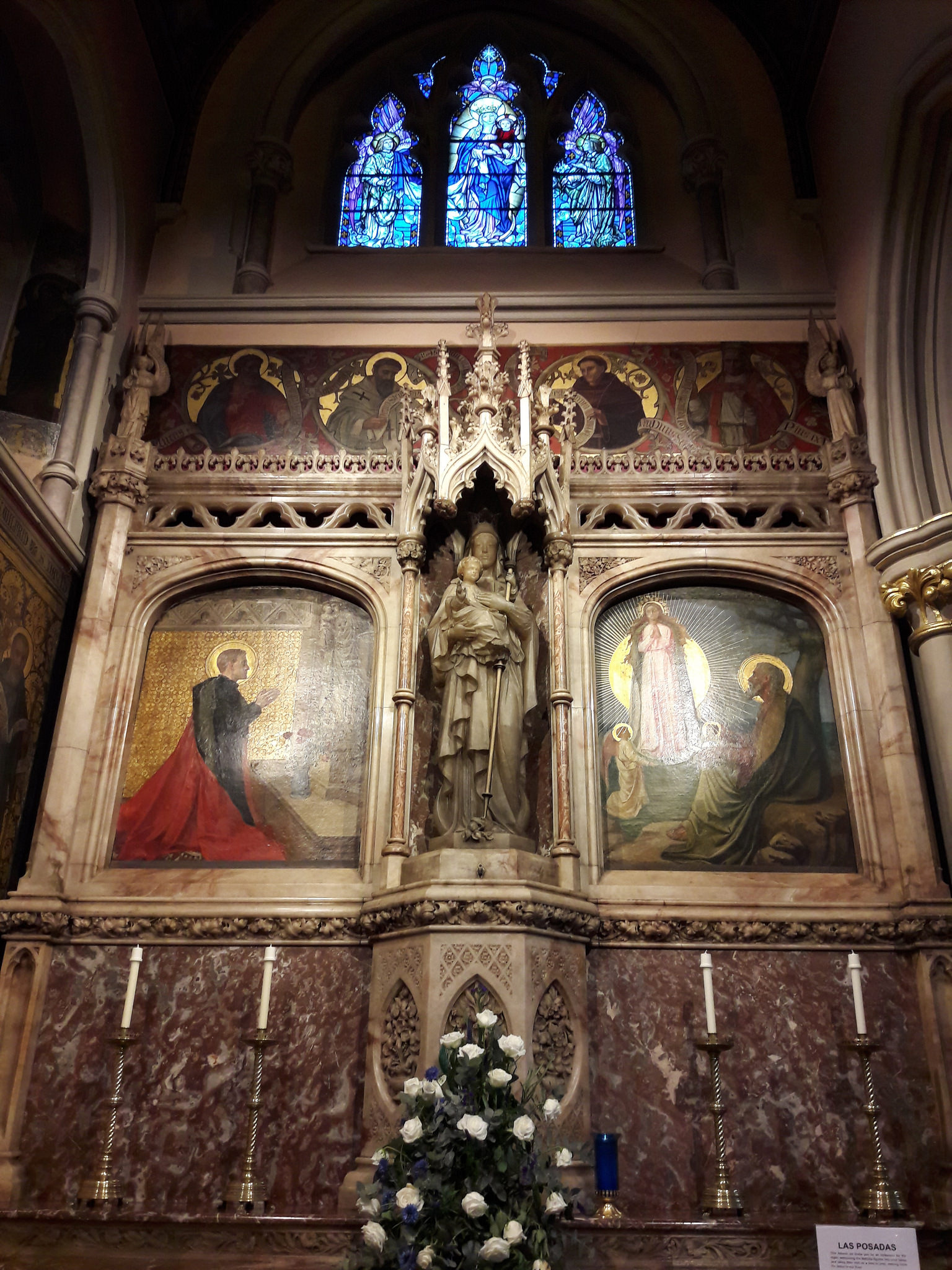
The Statue of the Virgin Mary in Our Lady's Chapel

In 1970 a major reordering took place at the instigation of Bishop Derek Worlock, in keeping with his interpretation of The Second Vatican Council. The elaborate baldacchino surmounting the high altar was destroyed and the paintings on the Sanctuary and side chapel walls by Nathaniel Westlake were mostly painted over. A new altar and font were installed and the whole sanctuary was modernised to the designs of the architect Austin Winkley.

Many of the changes made were short-lived and were reversed in a reordering in 1982 on the orders of Bishop Anthony Emery and another in 2001 under Bishop Crispian Hollis. The 2001 changes included replacing the 1970s font with one of a more traditional design.

== See also ==
- List of cathedrals in the United Kingdom
- List of places of worship in Portsmouth
