= St Joseph's Church, Aldershot =

St Joseph's Church
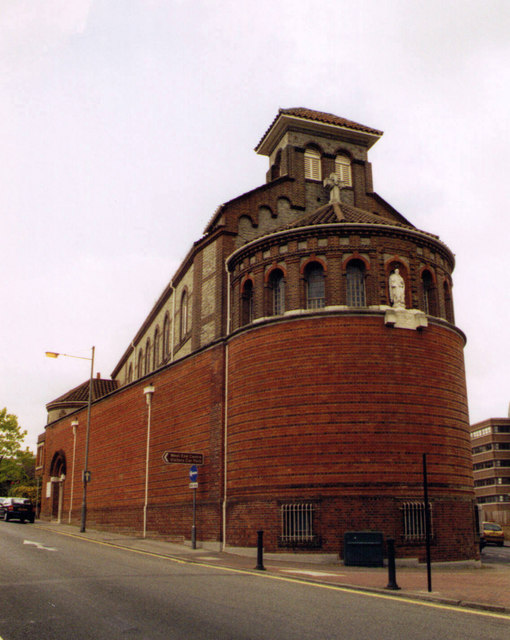
- East side of church
- St Joseph's Church
- 51.2484°N 0.7689°W
- OS grid reference: SU 86018 50634
- Location: Aldershot, Hampshire
- Country: England
- Denomination: Roman Catholic
- Website: Aldershot-Catholics.org.uk

History
- Status: Active
- Founded: 29 July 1869
- Founder: Fr Thomas Purcell
- Dedication: Saint Joseph

Architecture
- Functional status: Parish church
- Heritage designation: Grade II listed
- Designated: 9 June 1982
- Architect: George Drysdale
- Style: Romanesque revival
- Groundbreaking: 19 March 1912
- Completed: 30 January 1913

Administration
- Province: Southwark
- Diocese: Portsmouth
- Deanery: North Hampshire
- Parish: Aldershot

Clergy
- Bishop: Philip Egan
- Priest: Fr Robert Stewart

St Joseph's Church is a Roman Catholic Parish church in Aldershot, Hampshire. Built in 1913, it is situated at the top of a ridge on Queens Road, overlooking the town centre, between the Municipal Gardens and Princes Hall. It is a Grade II listed building. Sir Nikolaus Pevsner described it as 'One of the most impressive churches of its date, brilliantly planned on a triangular site.'

== History ==
=== Foundation ===
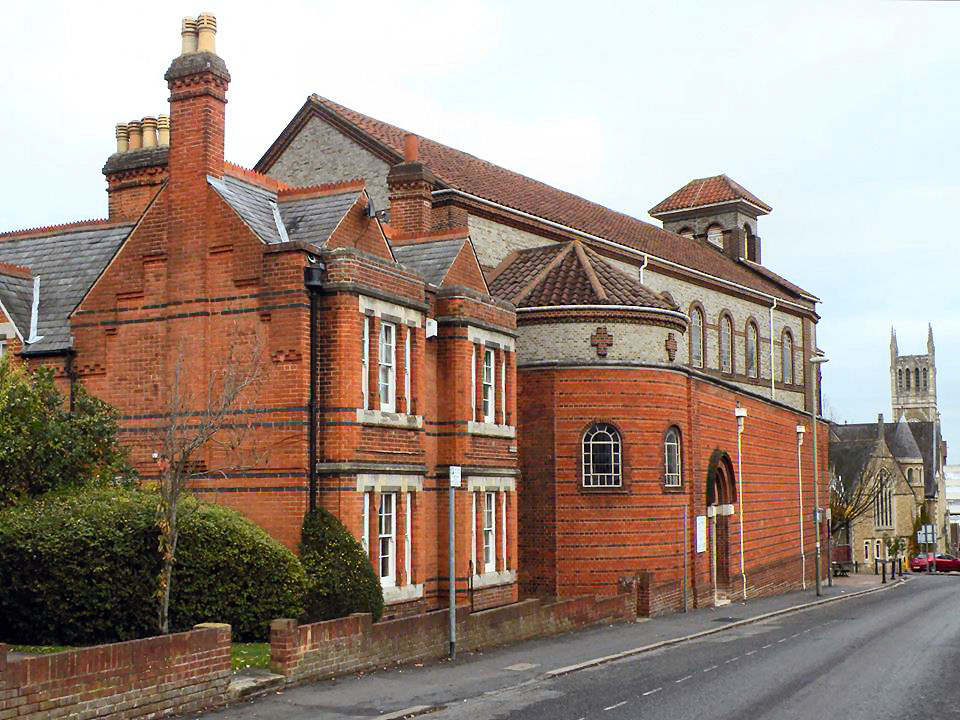
Side view of the church from Queens Road, with the Presbytery to the left

In 1869, the Bishop of Southwark, Thomas Grant appointed Fr Thomas Purcell to serve the local Aldershot Catholic population. He rented a building on the corner of Alexandra Road and Cambridge Road, opposite the former Franciscan Convent, to serve as a chapel and school. The chapel was opened on 29 July 1869. In 1871, before Fr Purcell's time in the area came to an end, he purchased the land, for £400, where the current church is located.

In 1871, the new priest, Fr Louis Hall, who came from St Joseph's Church in Southampton, bought a new plot of land for St Joseph's Primary School next to the same piece of land for the church. On 24 May 1883, a temporary church made of iron was opened and replaced the rented chapel as a place of worship for the local Catholic congregation.

The presbytery adjacent to the church was built in 1874 for Fr Hall and is a locally listed building on the Rushmoor Borough Council list. The two-storey building with lower ranges to the rear is of red brick with a natural slate roof.

=== Construction ===
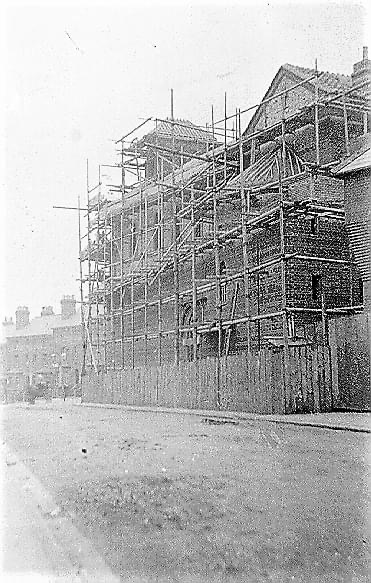
Construction of the exterior of St Joseph's Church in 1913

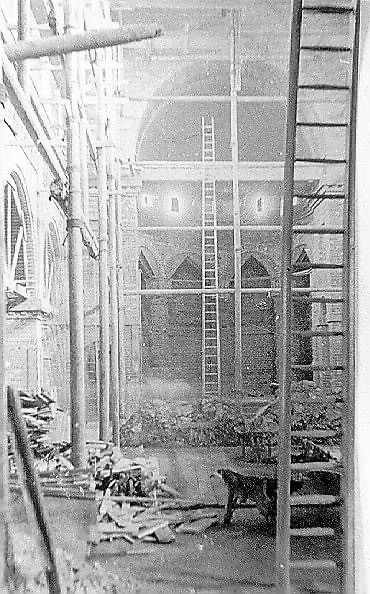
Construction of the interior of St Joseph's Church in 1913

In 1902, Fr Francis O'Farrell came to Aldershot and set about collecting funds to build a permanent church. After 10 years, enough money was collected, building work started and the foundation stone was laid by the Bishop of Portsmouth, William Cotter, on 12 March 1912. The church was designed by George Drysdale. The temporary iron church that was previously on the site was dismantled and reassembled on Belle Vue Road to become St Mary's Church. On 30 January 1913, St Joseph's Church was opened.

The architect, George Drysdale, needed to design as large a church as possible on a triangular site, symmetrical in design and within the funds available. It is built of red brick and tile, stone only being introduced into the floor and doorways. At the west end is a narthex and two altars, one each in the Lady chapel and the Chapel of Holy Souls occupying the full width of the church at this end. There is a graduated decrease in the building's width towards the high altar which occupies a semi-circular position at the eastern end. The sanctuary is raised above the level of the nave while the altar is of a greyish-green marble, the original communion rails – since removed – being of the same marble relieved with a band of yellow marble and bordered with black marble. There is a semi-circle of five columns of black marble with capitals of carved white marble above which are open arches.

The first Mass celebrated in St Joseph's on 30 January 1913

The frescoes on the nave walls were painted on-site by local artist Robert Senior. They depict scenes of the resurrection inspired by images from Isaiah, as well as the Wedding at Cana and others from the Old Testament. Since 2017 a number of relics, several large statues and a collection of 18th-century religious paintings have been added to the interior.

=== Establishment ===
In 1961, the nearby Secondary school All Hallows Catholic School was built in Weybourne, Surrey. It was funded by donations from the parishioners of St Joseph's Church. That year, a new Catholic church, St Saviour Church, was opened in the town to accommodate the expanding congregation in the town. In the 1980s, St Saviour Church was sold.

From 1962 to 1963, a permanent building was constructed for the nearby St Mary's Church in Belle Vue Road to replace its old temporary iron structure. In 1974, St Mary's became a parish church in its own right.

In 1973, St Joseph's Primary School, next to the church, was demolished and moved to another part of Aldershot. It was replaced by a new parish hall. On 22 June 1982, the church was consecrated.

== Parish ==
There is one Sunday Mass held at the church; 10:30 am (Sung). There is Mass at 9:30 am each morning from Monday to Thursday . St Joseph's Church is in the same parish as St Mary's Church, Belle Vue Road, Aldershot. At St Mary's Church there is a Sunday Vigil Mass at 5:30 pm on Saturday evening.

== Interior ==
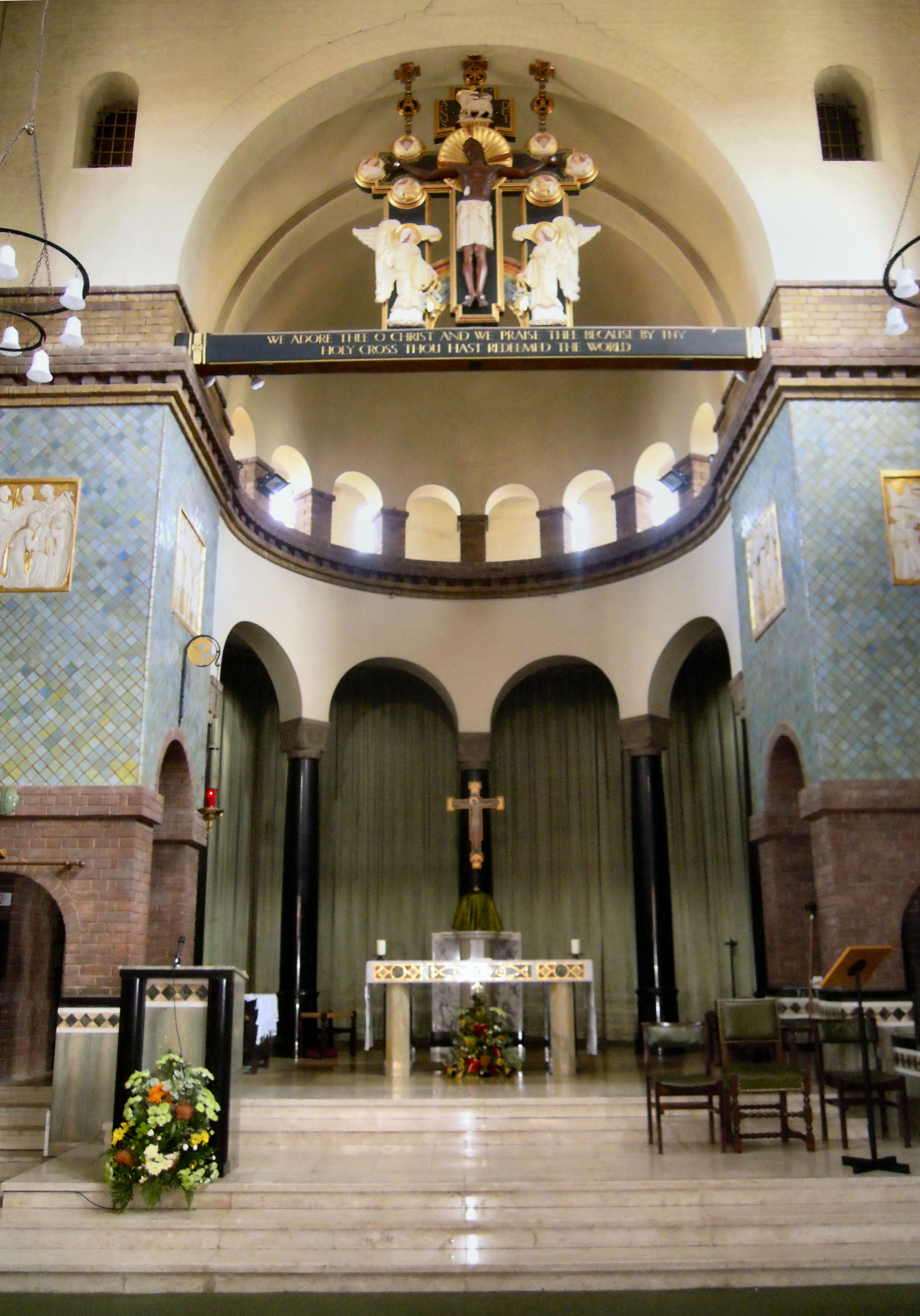
The altar in St Joseph's Church

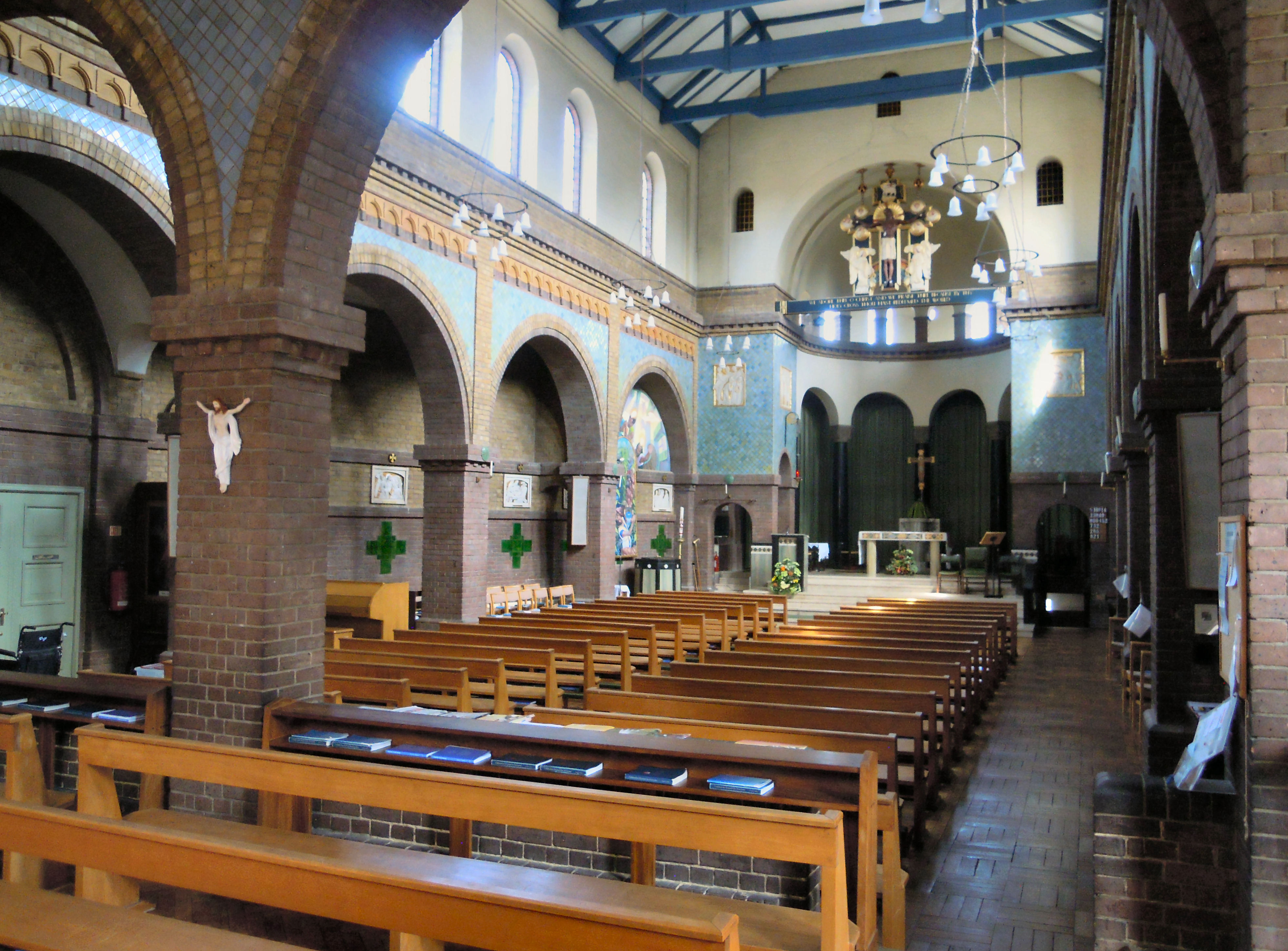
View towards the sanctuary

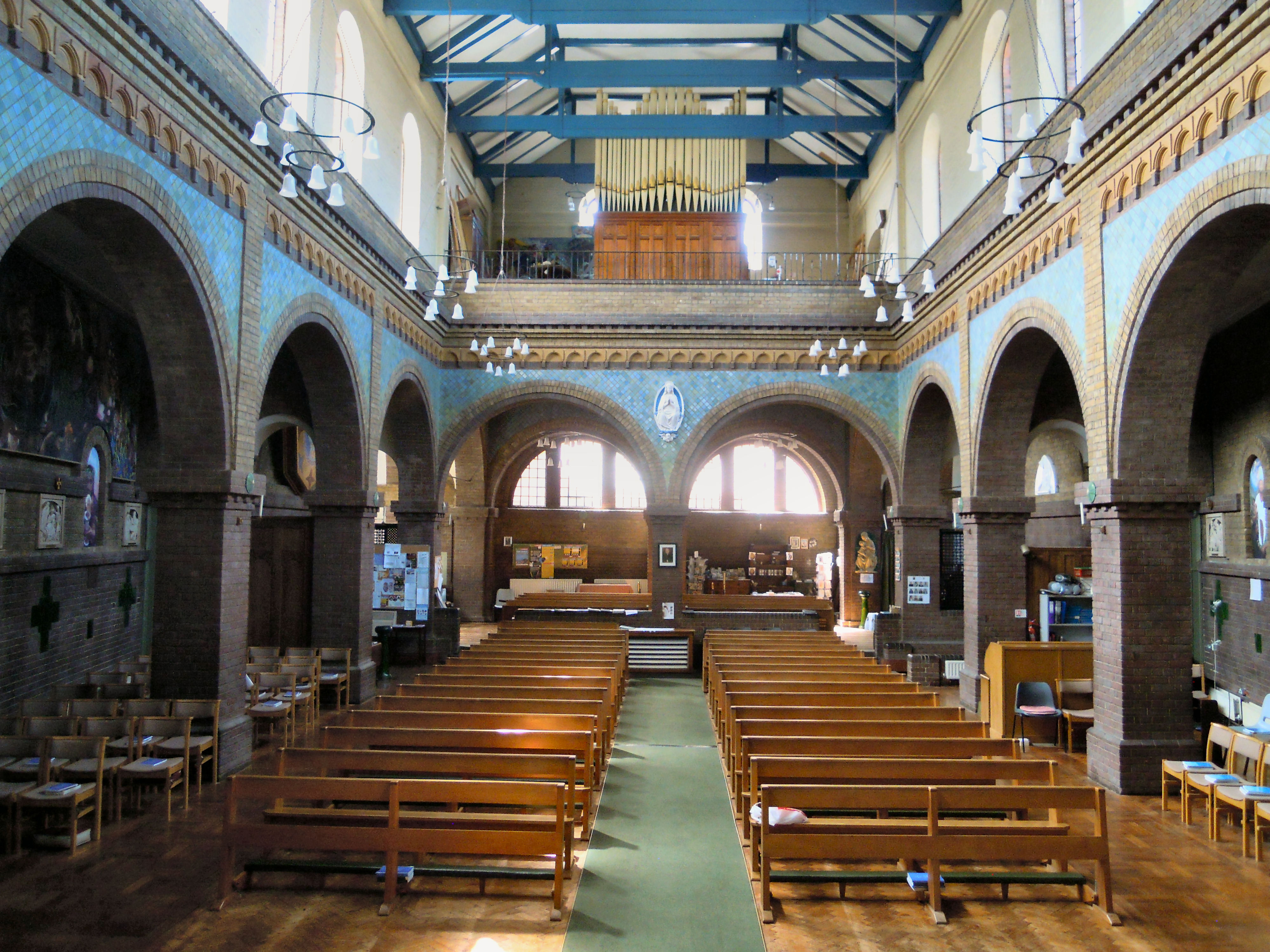
The nave photographed from the altar

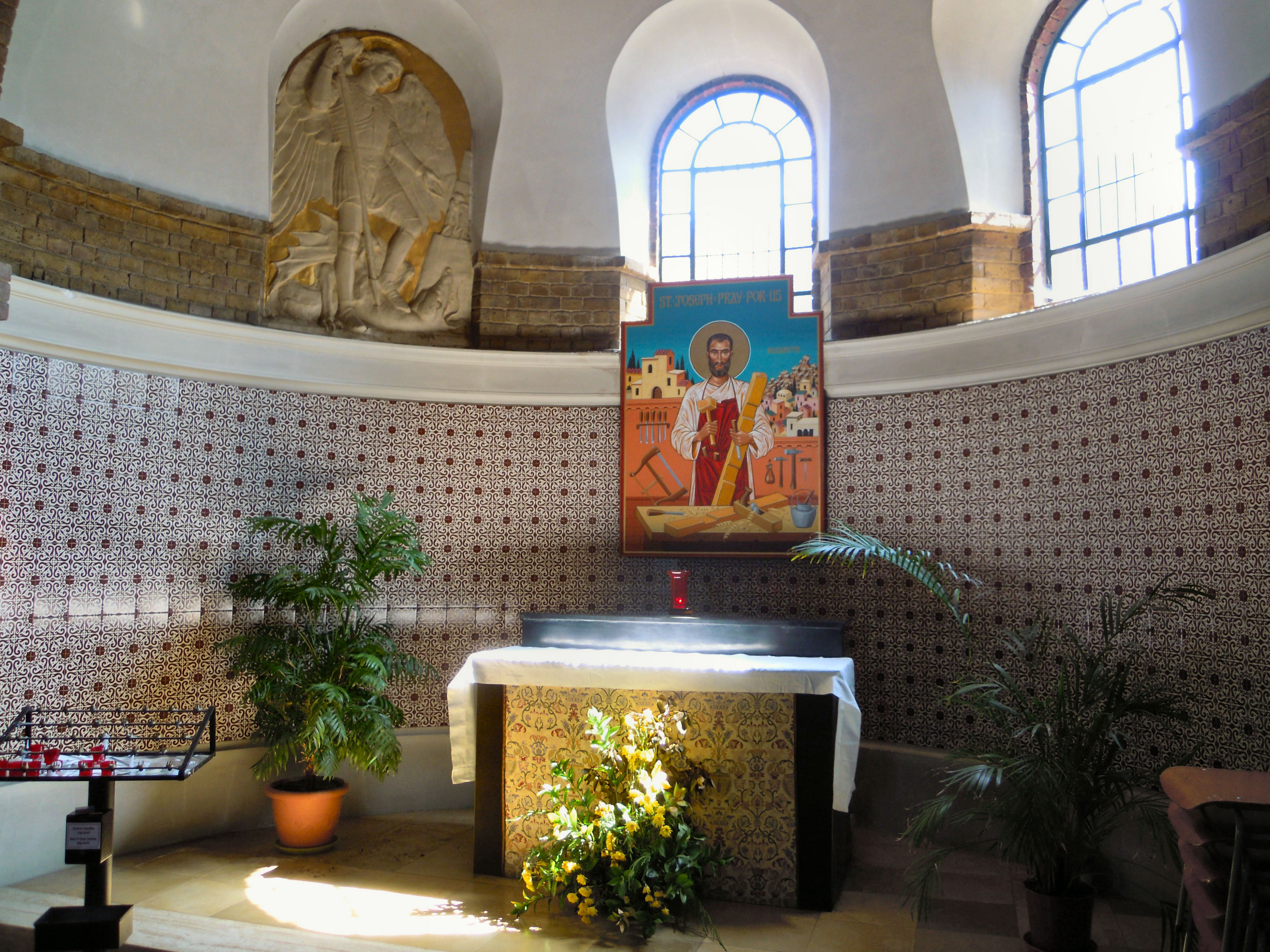
Chapel of the Holy Souls in the church

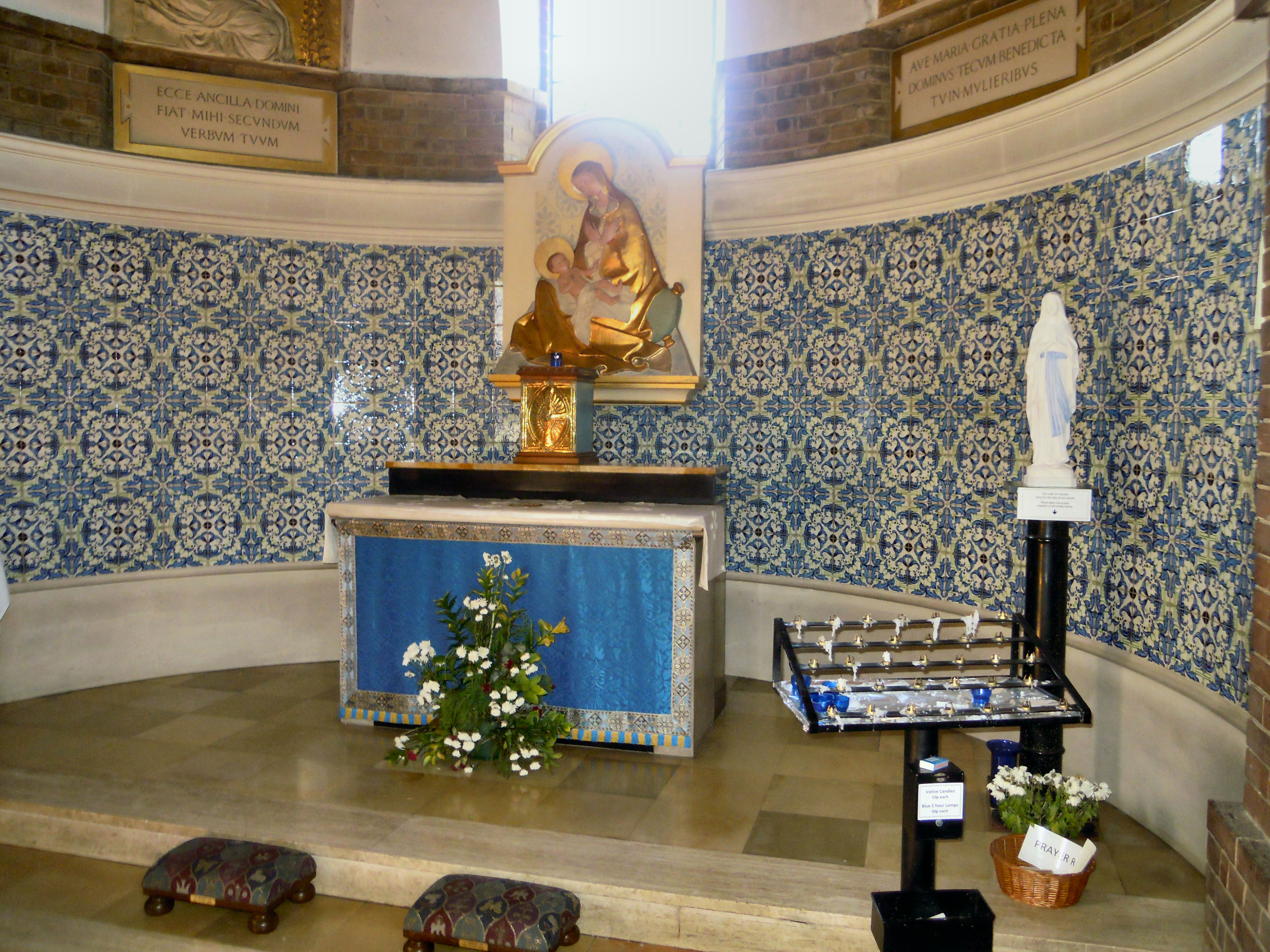
The Lady chapel in the church

== See also ==
- Cathedral of St Michael and St George, Aldershot
