= Our Lady Queen of Peace and Blessed Margaret Pole =

Roman Catholic church in Dorset, England

Coordinates: 50.723176°N 1.796967°W

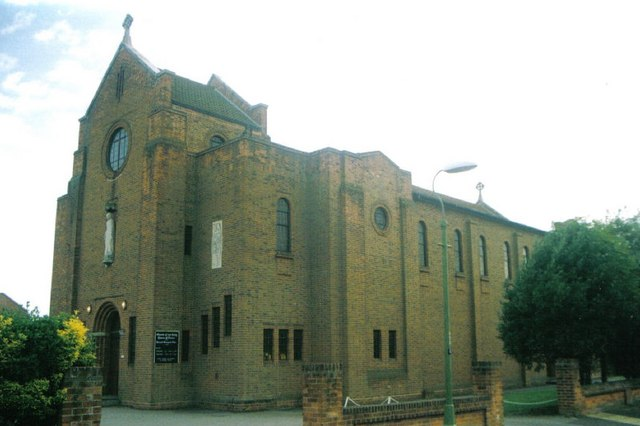
The present church's façade and flank, seen from the north, 2004.

Our Lady Queen of Peace and Blessed Margaret Pole is a Roman Catholic church in Douglas Road, Southbourne, Dorset BH6 3ER. It is in the Diocese of Portsmouth. The church is dedicated to Our Lady, Queen of Peace, with a secondary dedication to the martyr Blessed Margaret Pole, Countess of Salisbury.

== History ==
Before the parish was founded, Mass was said by a retired parish priest from Christchurch, Provost George Ballard (1822–1916). Ballard was a convert who had been ordained in 1852, and was parish priest in Christchurch from 1880 to 1889. In his retirement, he lived in Foxwold, Foxholes Road, and Mass was said privately. In 1890, a Mrs Gale, owner of the Southbourne Cliffs Hotel, lent their billiard room for religious services. After the death of Provost Ballard, an army hut was erected in 1918 opposite the hotel in Belle Vue Road, and Mass was said by priests from Christchurch until the site was sold in 1928.

== Present site ==
The present site was donated by Mr Reginald Cecil Lybbe Powys-Lybbe (1881–1930), a benefactor to the Church and a descendant of Blessed Margaret Pole. There is a plaque reading "Of your charity pray for the soul of Reginald Cecil Lybbe-Powys-Lybbe who generously gave the site on which the Southbourne church property stands. A Mass is said annually on Low Sunday for the repose of his soul. R.I.P."

A temporary church was built in 1928 and later became the church hall, rebuilt in 1956. The church was opened and blessed on 24 May 1939 by Rt Rev. William T. Cotter, Bishop of Portsmouth. It was consecrated on 27 May 1964 by Rt. Rev. Bishop T. Holland, Coadjutor Bishop of Portsmouth, assisted by Most Rev. Archbishop J.H. King, Bishop of Portsmouth. The church is built in the Italianate basilica style. The architect was Thomas Birchall Scott, F.R.I.B.A. (1872–1945), with the Portland stone statue of the Virgin Mary over the entrance executed by Mr Lindsay Clark, A.R.B.S.

The first parish priest in 1934 was Father Jesse Hetherington, followed by Father Joseph Murtagh (1949–1961), Father Timothy Dwyer (1961–1965), and Father Henry Murphy. When Father Murphy retired after 40 years, he was replaced by Father John Dunne, who retired in 2009.
