= Blessed Hugh Faringdon Catholic School =

Location
- Fawley Road; Reading, Berkshire, RG30 3EP; England; 51.445°N 1.004°W

Information
- Type: Comprehensive voluntary aided school
- Motto: Nihil Nisi Deo (Nothing without God)
- Religious affiliation: Roman Catholic
- Founder: Archbishop John Henry King
- Local authority: Reading
- Department for Education URN: 110107 Tables
- Ofsted: Reports
- Head teacher: Simon Uttley
- Gender: Mixed
- Age: 11 to 18
- Enrolment: 850
- Colour: Maroon
- Website: http://www.hughfaringdon.org/

Blessed Hugh Faringdon is a Catholic state secondary school in Reading in Berkshire, England. The school has approximately 850 pupils on roll and around 100 teaching and non teaching staff. The school specialises in Mathematics and the Performing Arts. Blessed Hugh Faringdon is one of the many Catholic schools in and around Reading but the only secondary and is under the Trusteeship of the Diocese of Portsmouth. The school is a member of the Partners in Excellence group of schools.

== History ==
Blessed Hugh Faringdon was founded in the 1958 by and for the Catholic Community in Reading. £200,000 was raised by the Catholic Community to purchase the land and build the school. The efforts were led by Archbishop John Henry King who encouraged the parishes of Reading to raise money through subscriptions, garden fetes, bazaars and bank loans.

The school was named after Hugh Faringdon, who was a member of the Order of Saint Benedict and was elected abbot of Reading Abbey in 1520. He frequently entertained King Henry VIII at the abbey, but in 1539, at the time of the dissolution of the monasteries, he was indicted for high treason and was executed opposite the present St James's Church. He was declared a martyr and beatified by Pope Leo XIII in 1895.

The school opened in 1958 to 60 pupils and the first Governing Body consisted of 9 people including Canon Murphy, and Fathers Kirk, Collins, O'Malley and Donnelly. The first of the school's Headteachers was appointed, Mr MP Healy, and he stayed for 18 years. The school celebrated its 50th anniversary in 2008. The current Headteacher is Simon Uttley, who has led the school since Easter 2017.

In 2013 72% of pupils achieved 5 A*-C GCSE grades including English and Maths, and 100% of pupils achieved 5 A*-C grades. Its Value Added figure for this was 1,043.3, against a national average of 1,000. This placed the school in the top 2% of schools in England using the Raiseonline measure. In November 2013 the Sunday Times published its list of the top 500 state schools and BHF was placed at number 472, placing it in the top 10% of schools in England.

The school was reinspected by Ofsted in 2017 where it was again judged to be "Good" with behaviour described as "typically superb". The following year the school secured a judgement of 'Outstanding' from the Roman Catholic Diocese of Portsmouth.

The school holds the International Schools award, the UNICEF Rights Respecting Foundation Award and is part of the iCan charity Secondary Talks programme.

In 2019 the school opened a £1.9m facility for students on the ASD spectrum. In 2020 the school increased its year on year admissions number from 150 to 180 to meet increasing demand.

== Sources ==
- "Inspection report" (PDF). OFSTED. 26 September 2007. Archived from the original (PDF) on 22 March 2012.
