= Crispian Hollis =

English Catholic Bishop (born 1936)

The Right Reverend Crispian Hollis
- Bishop Emeritus of Portsmouth
- Church: Catholic Church
- Province: Southwark
- Diocese: Portsmouth
- Appointed: 6 December 1988
- Installed: 27 January 1989
- Term ended: 11 July 2012
- Predecessor: Anthony Joseph Emery
- Successor: Philip Egan
- Previous posts: Roman Catholic Auxiliary Bishop of Birmingham (1987-1989); Titular Bishop of Cincari (1987-1989)

Orders
- Ordination: 11 July 1965 by William Theodore Heard
- Consecration: 5 May 1987 by Maurice Noël Léon Couve de Murville

Personal details
- Born: Roger Francis Crispian Hollis; 17 November 1936 (age 89) Bristol, England
- Denomination: Roman Catholic
- Parents: Christopher Hollis and Madeleine Hollis (née King)
- Education: Stonyhurst College; Balliol College, Oxford; English College, Rome

Roger Francis Crispian Hollis (born 17 November 1936, in Bristol) is the Bishop Emeritus of Portsmouth for the Roman Catholic Church.

== Early life ==
Crispian Hollis's parents were Christopher Hollis (1902–1977), the author and parliamentarian, and Madeleine Hollis (née King). Both his parents were received into the Roman Catholic Church. He is possibly unique among Catholic bishops in being the grandson of an Anglican bishop, the Right Revd George Arthur Hollis (1868–1944), vice-principal of Wells Theological College and later suffragan Bishop of Taunton, and the nephew of another, the Right Revd Arthur Michael Hollis, Bishop of Madras (1942-1954).

Hollis was educated at Stonyhurst College. He completed his national service as a 2nd Lt. with the Somerset Light Infantry which saw military action in Malaya. Upon his return from military service, Hollis studied successfully as a member of Balliol College, Oxford for a first degree. He then went to the Venerable English College in Rome, where he was ordained a priest for the Diocese of Clifton on 11 July 1965, and subsequently received a Licentiate of Sacred Theology (STL). For some time during the 1970s he was the chaplain at the Oxford University Catholic Chaplaincy.

== Ministry ==
In 1981 he was appointed Administrator of Clifton Cathedral in Bristol and Vicar General of the Diocese of Clifton. While still in this post, he was appointed a member of the IBA's panel of religious advisers and in 1986 became a member of the Central Religious Advisory Committee (CRAC) for the BBC and the IBA.

== Episcopal career ==
In February 1987, Hollis was appointed by the Holy See as an auxiliary bishop in the Archdiocese of Birmingham. He was assigned by the then Archbishop Maurice Noël Léon Couve de Murville special responsibility for the Oxfordshire area. This was not to last, for on 6 December 1988 the Holy See appointed him Bishop of Portsmouth.

Hollis served for a time as a member of the Pontifical Council for Social Communications of the Roman Curia, He was Chairman of the Catholic Media Trust and also chaired the Bishops' Committee for Europe. He was Chairman of the Bishops' Conference Department of Mission and Unity, Representative for the Bishops' Conference of the Churches Together in Britain and Ireland and a Member of IARCCUM (International Anglican Roman Catholic Committee for Unity and Mission). He is said to enjoy cricket and golf and, in the family tradition, to take a keen interest in current affairs.

Following an announcement in 2002 by its abbess of a move of the Benedictine Stanbrook Abbey in Worcestershire, three members of the community, led by Sister Catherine Wybourne, "Digitalnun", rebelled and decided to form a separate more media-oriented community. They found support in Hollis who sanctioned their resettlement at Holy Trinity Monastery, East Hendred, situated in the Vale of White Horse, Oxfordshire, and part of the Roman Catholic Diocese of Portsmouth in 2004.

In 2011, aged 75, Hollis announced that in accordance with canon law he had tendered his resignation as Bishop of Portsmouth. On Tuesday 11 July 2012, an official press release from the Vatican Information Service (VIS) of the Holy See Press Office stated that Pope Benedict XVI had named Philip Egan, Vicar General of the Roman Catholic Diocese of Shrewsbury, to be the new Bishop of Portsmouth. Egan was consecrated as the Eighth Bishop of Portsmouth, with Bishop Hollis serving as Principal Consecrator, on 24 September 2012, the Feast of Our Lady of Walsingham. Freed from his connection with the Diocese of Portsmouth, Bishop Hollis retired to the village of Mells, Somerset. The diocese issued a special commemorative edition of its newspaper to mark his retirement. In addition, the street which passes Portsmouth Roman Catholic Cathedral and the Bishop's house, previously part of Edinburgh Road, was renamed Bishop Crispian Way in his honour.

=== Lourdes ===
Hollis actively encourages people to travel to Lourdes, to which he has a great attachment, first going there in 1967 as a chaplain with the Oxford University Pilgrimage and then going annually with them until 1981. On returning to live within the Diocese of Clifton he travelled with the Clifton Pilgrimage each year up until 1986 and with the Portsmouth diocese since 1987.

The Portsmouth diocese, together with the Dioceses of Clifton, East Anglia, Northampton and Southwark and Stonyhurst College, travel each year with the Catholic Association Pilgrimage to Lourdes. Hollis was the patron of the Catholic Association Hospitalité until 2011.

Catholic Church titles
Preceded by Anthony Joseph Emery	Bishop of Portsmouth; 1989–2012	Succeeded by Philip Egan
