= Diocese of Portsmouth =

Diocese of Portsmouth may refer to:

- Anglican Diocese of Portsmouth
- Roman Catholic Diocese of Portsmouth
