= All Hallows Catholic School =

Secondary school in Surrey, England

Location
- Weybourne Road; Farnham, Surrey, GU9 9HF; England; 51°14′05″N 0°46′30″W

Information
- Type: Voluntary aided school
- Motto: Testimonium Perhibere Veritati (Bear witness to the truth)
- Religious affiliation: Roman Catholic
- Established: 1961
- Local authority: Surrey County Council
- Department for Education URN: 125315 Tables
- Ofsted: Reports
- Chair: Ian Anderson
- Headteacher: Mark Baines
- Gender: Coeducational
- Age: 11 to 18
- Enrolment: 1,456
- Houses: Alban, Clare, Edmund, John, More, Pole, Swithun, Hilda
- Colours: grey, navy, gold, blue, maroon
- Publication: News.com
- Website: www.allhallows.net

All Hallows Catholic School is a mixed, voluntary-aided comprehensive secondary school and Sixth Form in Weybourne, Farnham, Surrey, England. It is a Roman Catholic school affiliated to the Portsmouth diocese. The school offers many courses including A-levels, GCSEs and BTECs as well as other subject specific qualifications.

== History ==
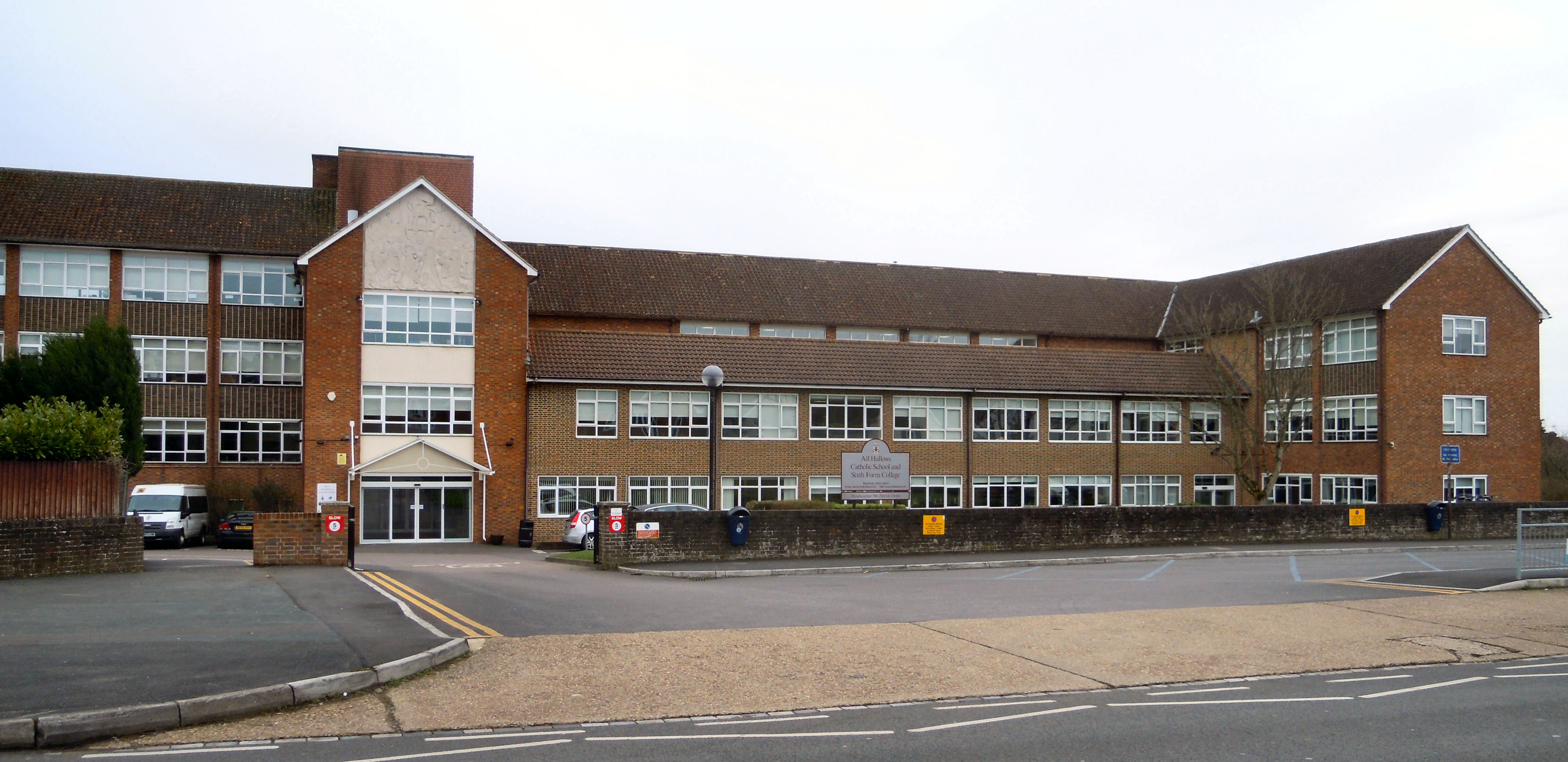
All Hallows in 2019

The school opened in 1961 through the initiative and funding by the people of St Joseph's Church, Aldershot.

Between 2010 and 2011, the school completed a major extension providing two new classrooms and a new science laboratory, and refurbished three other classrooms. There are also enhanced staff facilities and a completely redesigned reception area. 50th anniversary celebrations during 2011-2012 included a Mass to which former staff and students were invited and the construction of a Jubilee Memorial Garden.

Construction of a new Sixth Form Centre has finished and contains a photography classroom, a science lab and 9 seminar rooms, it has a cafeteria known as father Dan's, a study centre and a common room. It also contains an auditorium for school assemblies, theatrical performances, award presentations and termly masses. In 2021, the café, "Father Dan's" was renovated into a more modern space with improved seating space and food facilities for Sixth Form students.

In 2025,a new “St Thomas Aquinas” block was built, it contains 2 large exam halls and Humanities classrooms.

Current school facilities include an indoor heated swimming pool, gymnasium with fitness suite, a theatre with raked seating, drama studio and an art gallery/exhibition space.

The school has had a minority of students from each of the BRICS countries since the turn of the new millennium, as well as a recognition in the Ofsted report of popularity among families of the Gurkhas and British Nepali descendants.

== Controversy ==
In August 2017, a former religious studies teacher at the school was caught with more than a thousand indecent pictures of children and confessed to making prostitutes wear school uniforms, narrowly avoiding ten years of prison according to Judge Anil Murray.

Following the retirement of Elizabeth Lutzeier, in 2016 a new headteacher, Patrick Doyle, was appointed, and served until stepping down in 2020. Mr Mark Baines was appointed as his replacement in the interim, this appointment was later made permanent, and he is the current head teacher of the school.

== Extra curricular activities ==
Extra curricular activities include a number of sports such as football, rugby, fitness, cricket, netball, rounders (in summer) and swimming. There are also numerous musical activities such as Cantamus (Girl's choir), Boy's choir, Chamber Choir, String Orchestra, Senior Strings, Jazz Combo, Jazz Experience, Concert Band, Big Band, Senior Girls Choir, Brass Band. It also is the location of "Violins Together", "Cellos Together" and "Voices Together", which are groups open to all nearby schools.

The school holds 2 annual concerts, at Christmas and the end of spring, to showcase the school's musical abilities. The school also holds musicals each year, such as the production of Lionel Bart's "Oliver!" performed by the school in 2022.

== Assessment ==
The school was judged Outstanding in 2011, the highest category, having in the 2004 inspection been at good. All of the four grouped criteria were outstanding.

Depending on which of the main subjects is analysed, results overall in 2012 were in the top quintile nationally for two subjects and third quintile for the third subject area, Science. The 2013 results had "improved significantly" by 2013 according to the Ofsted report, results which have yet to be put into national groups for comparison between similar and all schools. However, there was not an inspection from 2017 to 2021. The school's sixth form achieved its best results in 2022, higher than the preceding two years where teacher assessment was used.

== Alumni ==
- Kevin Betsy, footballer, Head Coach England Men's U-18 football
- Grace Mouat, actor
- Sarah Olney, MP for Richmond Park 2016-2017 and 2019 to date
- Luisa Omielan, comedian
- Joe Ralls, footballer
- Michael Stickland, footballer
