= John Vertue =

English prelate of the Catholic Church (1826–1900)

The Right Reverend John Vertue
- Bishop of Portsmouth
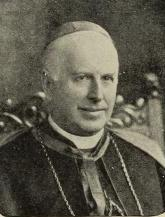
- Church: Catholic
- Diocese: Portsmouth
- Appointed: 13 June 1882
- In office: 1882 – 1900
- Successor: John Baptist Cahill

Personal details
- Born: 28 April 1826 Holborn, London, England
- Died: 23 May 1900 (aged 74) Bishop's House, Edinburgh Road, Portsmouth, Hampshire
- Buried: Highland Road Cemetery, Southsea, Hampshire
- Education: King's College London; St. Edmund's College, Ware; English College, Rome

Ordination history
History
Priestly ordination
- Date: 20 December 1851
- Place: Venerable English College, Rome, Italy
Episcopal consecration
- Principal consecrator: Henry Edward Manning
- Co-consecrators: Herbert Alfred Henry Vaughan, William Weathers
- Date: 25 July 1882
- Place: Our Lady of Victories, Pro-Cathedral, Kensington, London

John Vertue (or Virtue) (1826–1900) was an English prelate of the Catholic Church. He served as the first Bishop of Portsmouth in England from 1882 to 1900.

== Life ==
Born in London on 28 April 1826, Vertue attended King's College, London; and St. Edmund's College, Ware between 1845 and 1848. He then studied at the English College, Rome, where he was ordained on 20 December 1851 at Rome. He returned to England and was assigned to a parish in Poplar.

In 1853 he entered the diplomatic service of the Holy See, being offered the position of Secretary to the Papal Emissary to the United States. Upon returning to Rome he was named a monsignor, and in 1854 given charge of a mission in Hackney.

In 1855 he entered service as a military chaplain, first in Chatham, then in Aldershot. Established in 1854, at the time of the Crimean War, Aldershot Garrison was the first permanent training camp for the British Army. This led to a rapid expansion of Aldershot's population from 875 in 1851, to in excess of 16,000 by 1861 (including about 9,000 from the military). After six years, he was posted to Bermuda and ministered with care and courage to those suffering from an outbreak of Yellow Fever. When his term of service expired Monsignor Vertue volunteered to stay as he had become acclimatised to the local conditions and was less likely to fall ill than a new appointee. The War Office awarded him a special Vote of Thanks.

In 1865, Vertue was assigned to Colchester, and from 1871 to 1878 to Portsmouth. From Portsmouth he next went to Malta.

The Diocese of Portsmouth was formed in May 1882; the Church of St. John the Evangelist was named the cathedral. On 3 June 1882, Vertue was appointed the first Bishop of Portsmouth by Pope Leo XIII. He received his episcopal consecration on the following 25 July from Cardinal Henry Manning, Archbishop of Westminster, with Bishops Herbert Vaughan of Salford (later Archbishop of Westminster) and William Weathers, Auxiliary of Westminster, serving as co-consecrators.

The cathedral was consecrated by Vertue, on 29 March 1887. He enlarged it and completed its interior decorations. He built an episcopal residence and a large hall adjoining, which, with the cathedral, form a group of buildings artistic in design, and architecturally, a most noteworthy structure, among the ecclesiastical buildings in the Borough of Portsmouth.

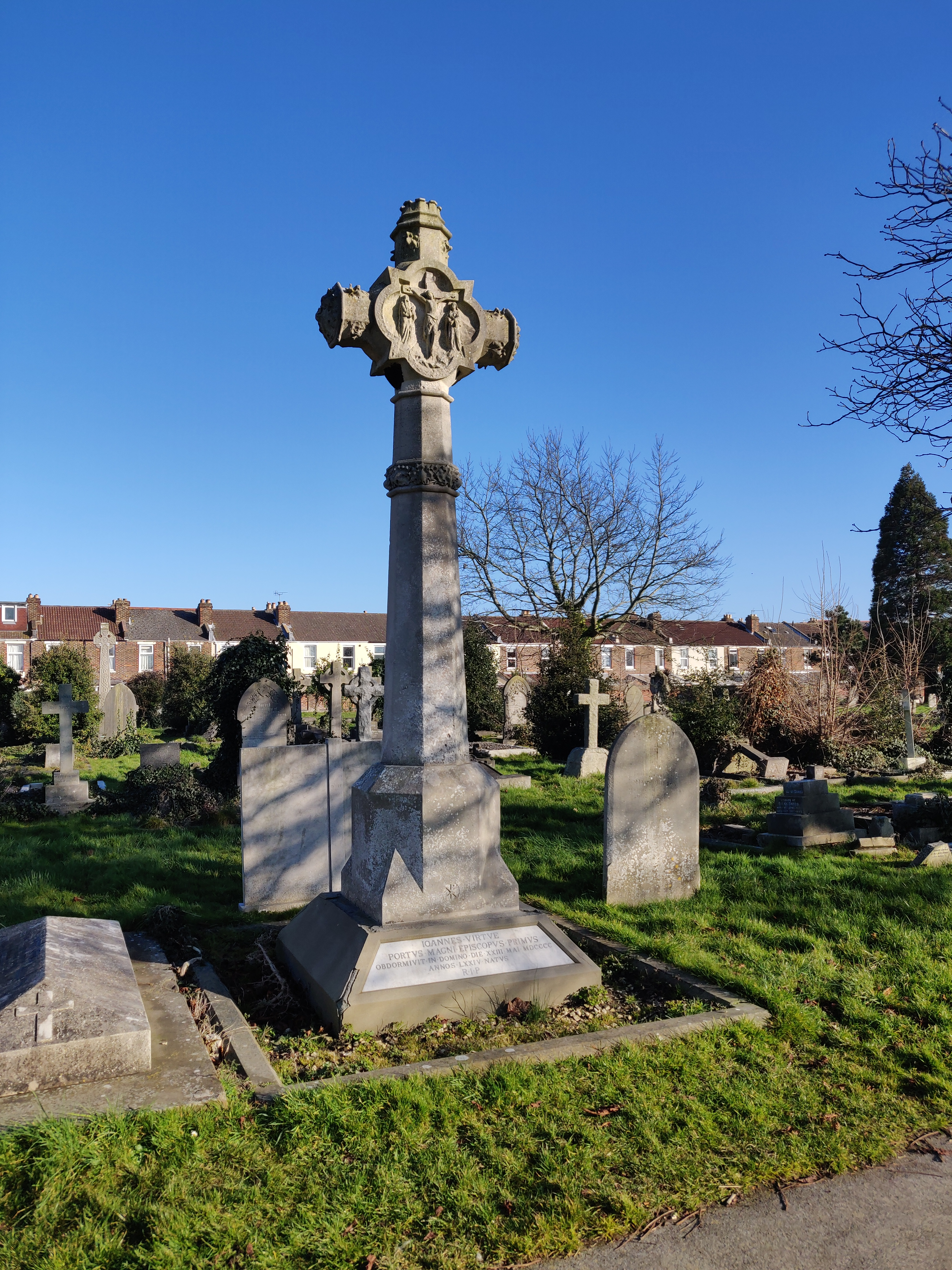
Grave of Bishop John Vertue

Bishop Vertue died in office on 23 May 1900, aged 74, and was buried at Highland Road Cemetery. A memorial chapel dedicated to Our Lady Immaculate and St Edmund of Abingdon, patrons of the Diocese of Portsmouth, was created at the east end of the north aisle in memory of him in the Cathedral of St John the Evangelist in Portsmouth.

Catholic Church titles
New title	Bishop of Portsmouth; 1882–1900	Succeeded by John Baptist Cahill
