= Our Lady of the Rosary Church, Saint Peter Port =

Coordinates: 49.453222°N 2.540611°W

Our Lady of the Rosary Church
- Notre Dame Du Rosaire Church
- Our Lady of the Rosary Church
- Location: Saint Peter Port
- Country: Guernsey; United Kingdom
- Denomination: Roman Catholic Church

Architecture
- Completed: 1829

The Our Lady of the Rosary Church Also Notre Dame Du Rosaire church is the name given to a religious building that is affiliated with the Catholic Church and is located in the town of Saint Peter Port in Guernsey, a dependency of the British Crown, part of the Channel Islands.

The church follows the Latin or Roman rite and is located within the Roman Catholic Diocese of Portsmouth (Dioecesis Portus Magni) based in Portsmouth, England, UK.

== History ==
The church was originally dedicated to St. Mary and opened in September 1829, being closed temporarily in 1851 after the opening of the Church of St. Joseph.

It was reopened in 1860 being placed in the hands of French religious and dedicated to Our Lady of the Rosary. It was restored between 1961 and 1962.

== See also ==
- Catholic Church in Guernsey
