= Holy Trinity Monastery, East Hendred =

Former Benedictine monastery in Oxfordshire

Coordinates: 51.59343°N 1.336053°W

Holy Trinity Monastery, East Hendred was briefly a convent of contemplative Benedictine nuns situated in the Vale of White Horse, Oxfordshire, from 2004 to 2012, forming part of the Roman Catholic Diocese of Portsmouth. In late May 2012 the community of two relocated to Howton Grove, Wormbridge, Herefordshire, where it became part of the Roman Catholic Archdiocese of Cardiff. The community retained its dedication to the Most Holy Trinity but, following Benedictine custom, it also became known by the name of the locality to which it had moved, and therefore called Howton Grove Priory.

== History ==
Sanctioned in 2004 by Bishop Crispian Hollis, it was the first breakaway convent of Benedictine nuns to have been established in England for more than half a century. The members were originally nuns of Stanbrook Abbey, Worcester, who left without permission, but the community became an autonomous convent of diocesan right with monastic rather than papal enclosure rights.

== Charitable works ==
The two nuns maintained themselves and their charitable undertakings by their work, principally book and web development. They made audio books for the blind and visually impaired and provided a postal library lending service. Their monastery web site was well known for its innovative use of new media and was an important element in the community's spiritual outreach. In 2009 it won the Premier Christian Media People's Choice Award. The monastery library had important collections of modern American and High Anglican theology and was open to students and others by appointment.

== Location ==
The nuns' first home was Stanbrook Abbey in Worcestershire and after their breakaway it was the presbytery, or priest's house, at East Hendred. They then bought a barn conversion on the edge of the Golden Valley, Herefordshire.
