= Bishop of Portsmouth =

Bishop of Portsmouth may refer to:

- Anglican Bishop of Portsmouth, a bishop of the established Church of England.
- Roman Catholic Bishop of Portsmouth, the Roman Catholic bishop.
