= Derek Worlock =

English Roman Catholic archbishop

The Most Reverend Derek Worlock CH
- Archbishop of Liverpool
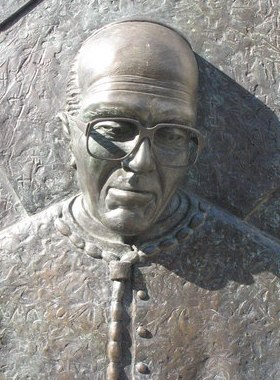
- Memorial portrait in Liverpool
- Church: Roman Catholic Church
- Archdiocese: Liverpool
- Province: Province of Liverpool
- Appointed: 7 February 1976
- Term ended: 8 February 1996
- Predecessor: George Andrew Beck AA
- Successor: Patrick Altham Kelly
- Previous post: Bishop of Portsmouth

Orders
- Ordination: 3 June 1944
- Consecration: 21 December 1965 by John Carmel Heenan

Personal details
- Born: Derek John Harford Worlock; 4 February 1920 London, England
- Died: 8 February 1996 (aged 76) Liverpool, England
- Buried: Metropolitan Cathedral of Christ the King, Liverpool
- Denomination: Roman Catholic Church
- Parents: Harford and Dora Worlock
- Motto: Caritas Christi eluceat

Derek John Harford Worlock CH (4 February 1920 – 8 February 1996) was an English prelate of the Roman Catholic Church and Archbishop of Liverpool.

== Life ==
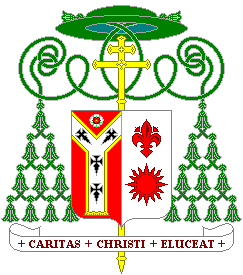
The coat of arms of Archbishop Derek Worlock

Worlock was born in St John's Wood, London, on 4 February 1920, the son of Captain Harford Worlock and his wife Dora (née Hoblyn), a suffragette (or as she called herself, a "suffragist"). His father, a journalist turned Conservative political agent, attended Keble College, Oxford, and planned to become a priest in the Church of England; many of his forebears had been Anglican clergy. However, Harford and Dora Worlock converted to Roman Catholicism and raised their son in that faith.

Worlock was a student at St Edmund's College from 1934 to 1944. By this time the family home was in Winchester. As a small boy he was rebuked for "having an answer to everything", a trait that remained. He was ordained at Old Hall Green on 3 June 1944 as a priest of the Diocese of Westminster, seminarians being exempt from military service so they could be rushed through to serve as chaplains.

Not long afterwards, he was appointed private secretary to Cardinal Griffin, and assisted successive cardinal-archbishops of Westminster for almost two decades. He attended every session of the Second Vatican Council between 1962 and 1965.

Worlock was appointed Bishop of Portsmouth on 18 October 1965 and consecrated at the Cathedral of St John the Evangelist, Portsmouth, on 21 December 1965. While in Portsmouth he set about renewing parishes, as well as undertaking the work of developing ecumenical relationships and the building of over 30 new churches in his diocese.

In 1976, he was appointed Archbishop of Liverpool. He was one of the panellists for the first edition of the BBC programme Question Time in 1979. The following year, he convened at Liverpool the National Pastoral Congress which gave rise to the report "The Easter People". Important events in his cathedral included the visit of Pope John Paul II in 1982 and the 1990 launch of the Council of Churches of Britain and Ireland. Worlock contributed to the work of reconciliation after the Toxteth riots in 1981 and in the aftermath of the football stadium tragedies at Heysel in 1985 and Hillsborough in 1989.

Worlock was committed to evangelisation and collaborated with his fellow Christian leaders, as demonstrated by the books Better Together and With Hope in our Hearts which he and his Anglican counterpart in Liverpool, Bishop David Sheppard, jointly produced. In July 1992, Worlock underwent major surgery for lung cancer. He survived long enough to celebrate the 50th anniversary of his ordination to the priesthood two years later, before succumbing to the disease in 1996.

== Legacy ==
In January 1994, along with David Sheppard, he was awarded the Freedom of the City of Liverpool. He was appointed as a Member of the Order of the Companions of Honour in the 1996 New Year Honours, but died of cancer four days after his 76th birthday and one day after the 20th anniversary of his appointment as archbishop, just a week before he was due to be invested.

On 11 May 2008, during the Christian Walk of Witness, the Sheppard-Worlock Statue in the form of two bronze doors was unveiled to honour both Worlock and David Sheppard. The memorial was designed by the sculptor Stephen Broadbent and was funded by public donations. The memorial is situated halfway down Liverpool's Hope Street, which joins both the Roman Catholic and Anglican cathedrals.

== Sources ==
- Kay, David J. S. (2003). The People of St Edmund's College (The Edmundian Association). ISBN 0-9546125-0-7

Catholic Church titles
Preceded by John Henry King	Bishop of Portsmouth; 1965–1976	Succeeded by Anthony Joseph Emery
Preceded by George Andrew Beck	Archbishop of Liverpool; 1976–1996	Succeeded by Patrick Altham Kelly
