= Catholic Church in Guernsey =

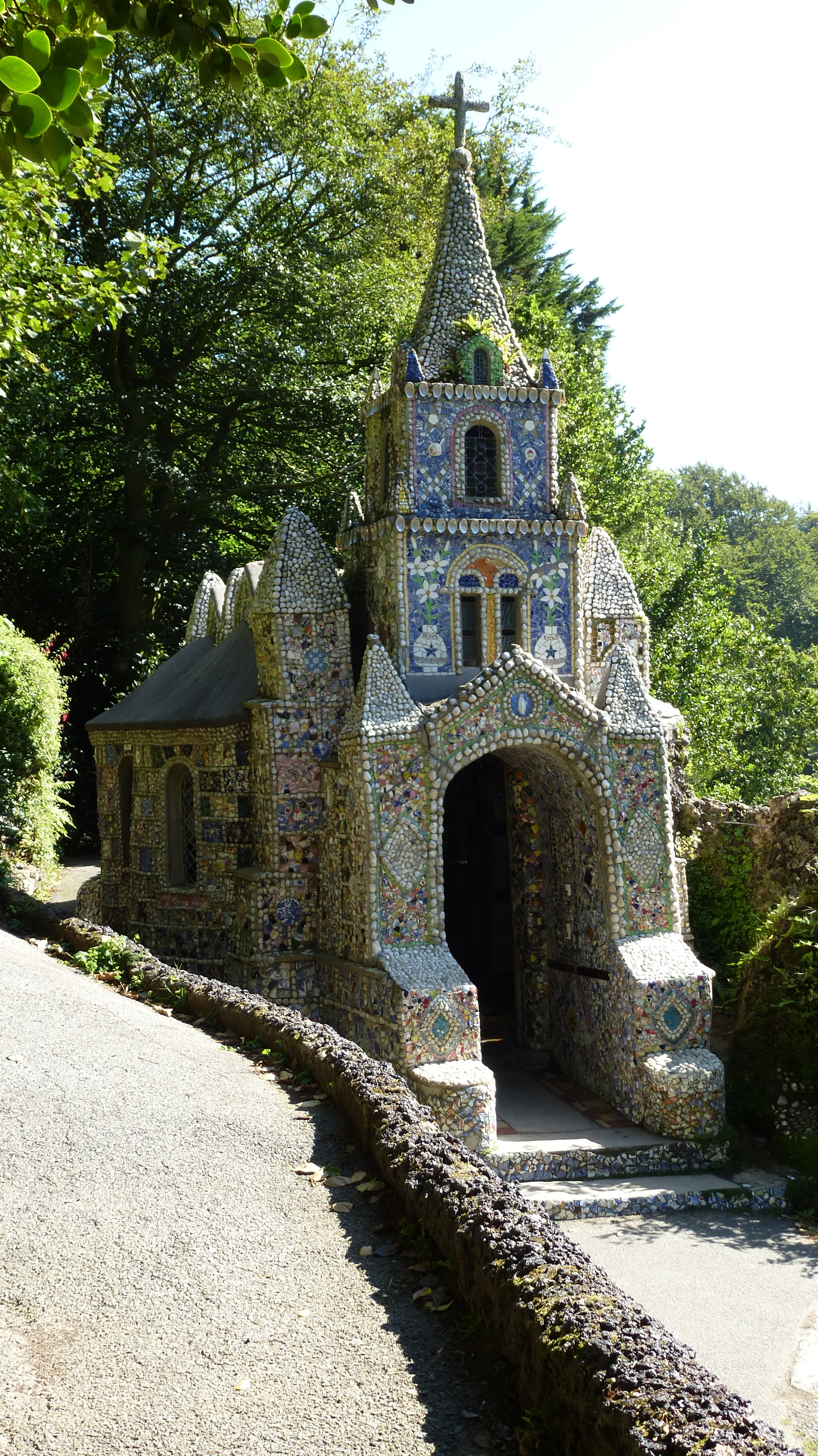
Little Chapel, St. Andrew, Guernsey

The Catholic Church in Guernsey is part of the worldwide Catholic Church, under the spiritual leadership of the Pope in Rome.

Although Guernsey is not part of the United Kingdom, for administrative purposes the diocese falls under the jurisdiction of the English Diocese of Portsmouth.

== Churches ==
There are three Catholic churches on Guernsey - two in St Peter Port (St Joseph & St Mary and Notre Dame Du Rosaire) and one in St Sampson's (Our Lady Star of the Sea, Delancey).

== Schools ==
The Catholic Church runs three schools in Guernsey, Notre Dame du Rosaire Primary School, the St Mary & St Michael Primary School and Blanchelande College (for students aged 4-18).
