= William Weathers =

Catholic bishop (1814–1895)

- Titular Bishop of Amyclae
- Church: Catholic Church
- In office: 27 September 1872 – 4 March 1895
- Predecessor: Antonio Herrán
- Successor: Patrick Foley
- Other posts: Auxiliary Bishop of Westminster (1872-1895)

Orders
- Ordination: c. 1838
- Consecration: 28 October 1872

Personal details
- Born: 12 November 1814 London, United Kingdom of Great Britain and Ireland
- Died: 4 March 1895 (aged 80) Isleworth, London, United Kingdom of Great Britain and Ireland

Bishop William Weathers (12 November 1814 – 4 March 1895 in Isleworth, Middlesex, England) was a Roman Catholic bishop of the Catholic Church in England and Wales as well the titular Bishop of Amycla. His parents were originally Protestants from Wales. He, his mother and siblings were converted to Roman Catholicism after his father's death. He was educated at the Franciscan school at Baddesley (1823–28), and at Old Hall, where he remained for forty years, and held in turn every office. Before his ordination (1838) he was already a master (1835). He was prefect of discipline 1840–43, vice-president and procurator 1843–51, prefect of studies for some years, and president 1851–68.

His presidency forms a memorable epoch in the history of the college and of Catholicism in southern England. The years succeeding the restoration of the Hierarchy saw a readjustment of standards.

With a view to invigorate the future secular clergy, Archbishop Henry Edward Manning, also a convert to Roman Catholicism, albeit from Anglicanism, thought it necessary that the control of the seminary should be in the hands of his newly formed congregation, the Oblates of St. Charles. Under Manning's influence, Cardinal Nicholas Wiseman appointed a staff at St Edmund's College, Ware, who were neither desired nor welcomed by the president (1855–56). The result was an attempt to manage the college without the president's co-operation. The Westminster Chapter took up the matter, and, after an appeal to Rome, the Oblates were withdrawn in 1861.

Dr. Weathers' own appreciation of higher ideals is indicated by the remodelling of the college rules during his presidency, and by the invitation and firm support given to Dr. Ward, a convert and a layman, as lecturer in theology (1852–58). When Archbishop Manning removed the divines to Hammersmith in 1869, he appointed Weathers rector of that seminary, which position Weathers held until the seminary was closed by Cardinal Herbert Vaughan in 1892. At his own choice, he then became chaplain to the Sisters of Nazareth at Isleworth.

He had been created D.D. in 1845, became a canon of Westminster in 1851, was named a domestic prelate to Pope Pius IX in 1869, and was consecrated bishop, as auxiliary to Archbishop Manning, in 1872. In 1868 he went to Rome as representative theologian of the English bishops in the deliberations preparatory to the First Vatican Council. He published (under the name Amyclanus), An Enquiry into the Nature and Results of Electricity and Magnetism (1876).
