= Thomas Holland (bishop) =

English prelate

The Right Reverend Thomas Holland
- Bishop of Salford
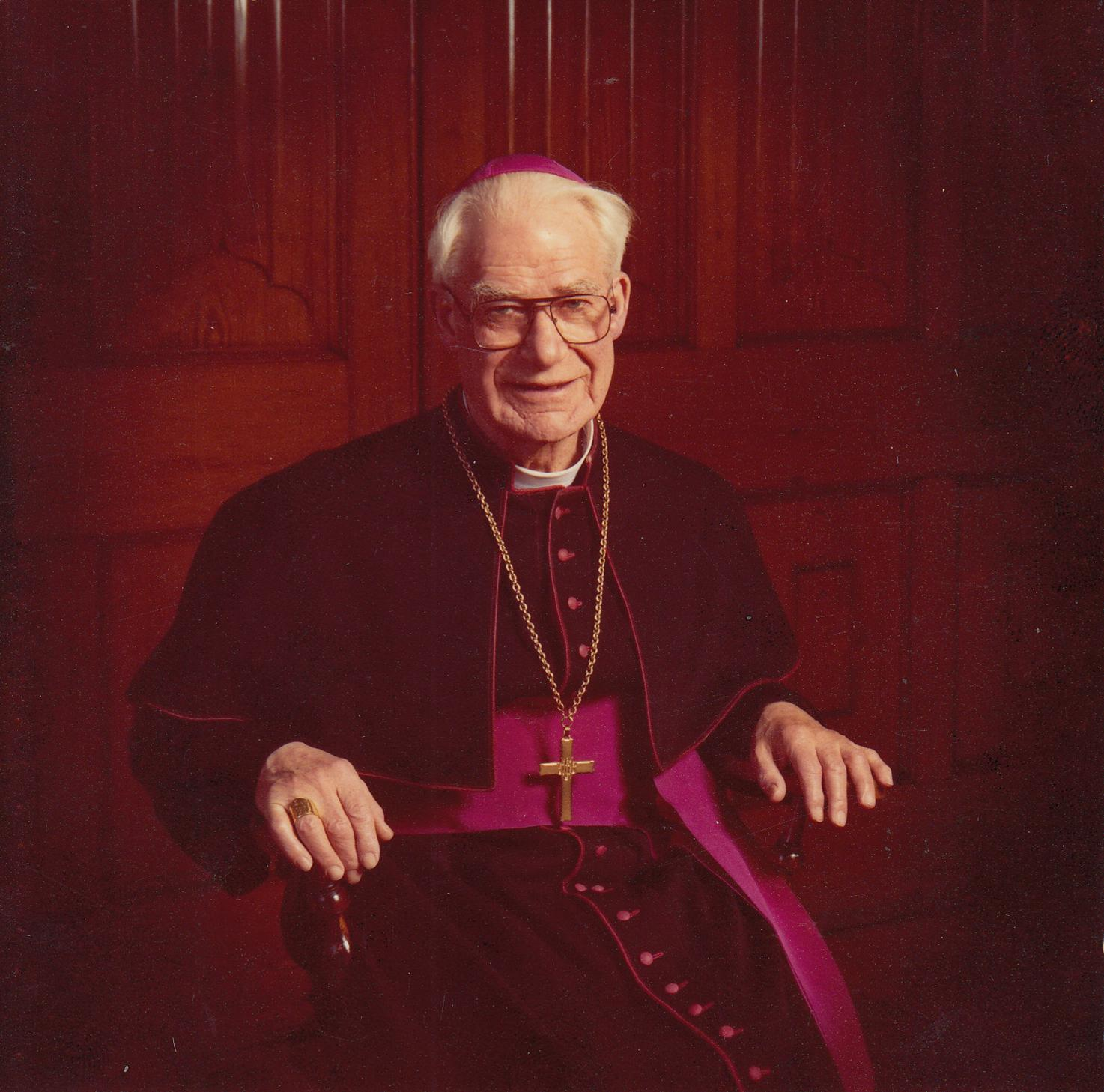
- Diocese: Salford
- Appointed: 3 September 1964
- Term ended: 22 June 1983
- Predecessor: George Andrew Beck
- Successor: Patrick Kelly

Orders
- Ordination: 18 June 1933
- Consecration: 21 December 1960 by John King

Personal details
- Born: 11 June 1908 Southport, Lancashire, England
- Died: 30 September 1999 (aged 91) Manchester, England
- Denomination: Catholic

Thomas Holland (11 June 1908 – 30 September 1999) was an English prelate of the Catholic Church. He served as the Bishop of Salford from 1964 to 1983.

== Life ==
Born in Southport on 11 June 1908, he was ordained on 18 June 1933 as a priest for the Archdiocese of Liverpool. He was appointed Coadjutor Bishop of Portsmouth and Titular Bishop of Etenna on 31 October 1960. His consecration to the Episcopate took place on 21 December 1960 at St John's Cathedral in Portsmouth; the principal consecrator was Archbishop John King of Portsmouth, and the principal co-consecrators were Bishop George Dwyer of Leeds (later Archbishop of Birmingham) and Bishop John Healy of Gibraltar. He participated in all four sessions of the Second Vatican Council, held between 1962 and 1965. On 16 October 1963, Holland became the first bishop to call from the Council floor for what would later be established as the Synod of Bishops.

On 3 September 1964, Holland was appointed the bishop of the Diocese of Salford.

He retired on 22 June 1983 and assumed the title Bishop Emeritus of Salford. He died on 30 September 1999, aged 91.

Catholic Church titles
Preceded by George Andrew Beck	Bishop of Salford; 1964–1983	Succeeded by Patrick Altham Kelly
