= John Cahill (bishop) =

English prelate

The Right Reverend John Baptist Cahill
- Bishop of Portsmouth
- Church: Roman Catholic
- Diocese: Portsmouth
- Appointed: 30 August 1900
- In office: 1900-1910
- Predecessor: John Vertue
- Successor: William Cotter

Orders
- Ordination: 16 October 1864
- Consecration: 1 May 1900 by Francis Bourne
- Rank: Bishop

Personal details
- Born: 2 September 1841 London, England
- Died: 2 August 1910 (aged 68)

John Baptist Cahill (1841–1910) was an English prelate of the Roman Catholic Church. He served as the second Roman Catholic Bishop of Portsmouth from 1900 to 1910.

== Life ==
Born in London on 2 September 1841, he was a student at St. Edmund's College, Ware between 1855 and 1863. He was ordained a priest for the Diocese of Southwark on 4 October 1864. Cahill had been Rector of Ryde since 1868, and vicar-general of the diocese since its foundation.

He was appointed an Auxiliary Bishop of Portsmouth and Titular Bishop of Thagora on 21 March 1900. His consecration to the Episcopate took place on 1 May 1900, the principal consecrator was Francis Bourne, Bishop of Southwark (later Archbishop of Westminster), and the principal co-consecrators were John Cuthbert Hedley, Bishop of Newport and Menevia and Charles Maurice Graham, Coadjutor Bishop of Plymouth. Bishop Vertue died three weeks later. Three months later, Cahill was appointed Bishop of Portsmouth on 30 August 1900.

Cahill completed the cathedral by adding the west front, and carried out several important changes in the interior. Cahill's ten year episcopate was marked by the influx of religious communities, owing to the French persecutions. It was thus that the diocese was enriched by the presence of such congregations as the Benedictines of Solesmes, both monks and nuns. Five Abbeys (Douai, Quarr, Farnborough, Ryde, and East Cowes) were founded in the diocese.

Bishop Cahill died at Portsmouth on 2 August 1910, aged 68.

Catholic Church titles
Preceded by John Vertue	Bishop of Portsmouth; 1900–1910	Succeeded by William Timothy Cotter
