= Anthony Emery (bishop) =

English Roman Catholic priest

The Right Reverend Anthony Joseph Emery
- Bishop of Portsmouth
- Church: Roman Catholic
- Diocese: Portsmouth
- Appointed: 13 September 1976
- In office: 1976–1988
- Predecessor: Derek Worlock
- Successor: Crispian Hollis
- Previous post: Auxiliary Bishop of Birmingham (1967–1976)

Orders
- Ordination: 30 May 1953 by Humphrey Bright
- Consecration: 4 March 1968 by George Dwyer
- Rank: Bishop

Personal details
- Born: 17 May 1918 Burton upon Trent, Staffordshire, England
- Died: 5 April 1988 (aged 69)

Anthony Joseph Emery (17 May 1918 – 5 April 1988) was an English prelate of the Roman Catholic Church. He served as the sixth Roman Catholic Bishop of Portsmouth from 1976 to 1988.

== Life ==
Born in Burton upon Trent, Staffordshire in 1918, Emery enlisted in the military in 1940 and was released from service in 1945.

He was ordained a priest at Oscott for Archdiocese of Birmingham on 30 May 1953. He was appointed an Auxiliary Bishop of Birmingham and Titular Bishop of Tamallula on 6 December 1967. His consecration to the Episcopate took place at St Chad's Cathedral, Birmingham on 8 March 1968; the principal consecrator was Archbishop George Patrick Dwyer, with Bishops Rudderham and Cleary as co-consecrators.

Eight years later, he was appointed the Bishop of the Diocese of Portsmouth on 13 September 1976.

== Death ==
Bishop Emery died in office on 5 April 1988, aged 69.

Catholic Church titles
Preceded by Derek John Worlock	Bishop of Portsmouth; 1976–1988	Succeeded by Roger Francis Crispian Hollis
