= Philip Egan =

English Catholic bishop (born 1955)

The Right Reverend Philip Egan
- Bishop of Portsmouth
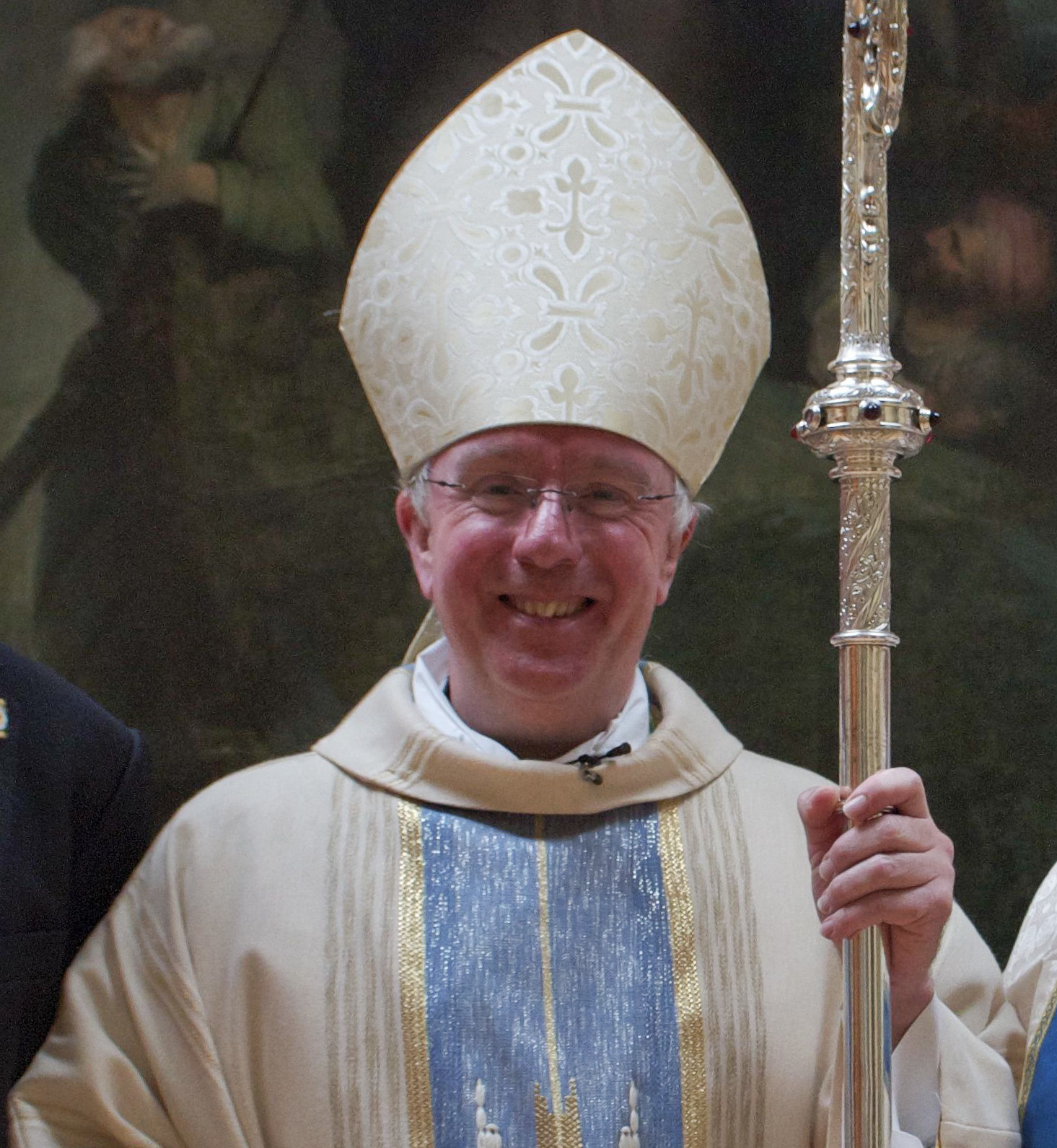
- Egan in 2013
- Church: Roman Catholic Church
- Province: Southwark
- Diocese: Portsmouth
- See: Portsmouth, England
- Appointed: 11 July 2012
- Installed: 24 September 2012
- Predecessor: Crispian Hollis

Orders
- Ordination: 4 August 1984 by Joseph Gray
- Consecration: 24 September 2012 by Crispian Hollis

Personal details
- Born: 14 November 1955 (age 70) Altrincham, Cheshire, England
- Denomination: Roman Catholic
- Education: King's College London; Pontifical Gregorian University; University of Birmingham
- Motto: in corde Jesu
- Coat of arms

Philip Anthony Egan (born 14 November 1955) is an English Catholic prelate who has served as the eighth Bishop of Portsmouth since 2012.

== Early life ==
Egan was born in Altrincham, a suburb of Manchester. He was educated at St Ambrose College, an all boys' grammar school in his local town, and then studied classics at King's College London. He completed training for the priesthood at Allen Hall Seminary, Westminster, and at the Venerable English College in Rome. He was awarded his Licentiate in Sacred Theology (STL) from the Pontifical Gregorian University. Subsequently, he gained a doctorate in theology (PhD) from the University of Birmingham.

== Priesthood ==
On 4 August 1984, he was ordained to the priesthood for the Roman Catholic Diocese of Shrewsbury. From 1984 to 1988, Egan served as parochial vicar at St Anthony's, Woodehouse Park, Manchester. From 1988 to 1991, he served as an assistant chaplain at the University of Cambridge. From 1991 to 1994, he served as parish vicar and chaplain at Arrowe Park Hospital on the Wirral. From 1994 to 1995, he completed theological studies at Boston College in the United States, and then served as a professor of fundamental theology and dean of studies at Oscott College seminary in Birmingham until 2007. In 2007-2008, he was a post-doctoral fellow at Boston College's Lonergan Institute. In 2008, Egan became parish priest of Our Lady and St Christopher's in Stockport. In 2010, he was named to his previous post as Vicar General of the Diocese of Shrewsbury.

== Episcopate ==
On 11 July 2012, Egan's appointment as the eighth Bishop of Portsmouth was announced in an official press release from the Vatican Information Service (VIS), an arm of the Holy See Press Office. At the time of his appointment Egan was serving as the Vicar General of the Diocese of Shrewsbury. His episcopal consecration took place at St John’s Cathedral, Portsmouth on 24 September 2012, the feast of Our Lady of Walsingham.

Egan takes a conservative stance on social issues such as LGBT rights and abortion. In a 2014 interview, he generated controversy for his views that MPs who voted for same-sex marriage should be banned from receiving communion.

Catholic Church titles
Preceded by Crispian Hollis	Bishop of Portsmouth; 2012–present	Incumbent
