= Roman Catholic Bishop of Portsmouth =

Ordinary of the Catholic Diocese of Portsmouth

Bishop of Portsmouth
- Bishopric

catholic
- Coat of arms
- Incumbent: Philip Egan

Location
- Ecclesiastical province: Southwark

Information
- First holder: John Vertue
- Established: 1882
- Diocese: Portsmouth
- Cathedral: Cathedral of St John the Evangelist, Portsmouth

The Bishop of Portsmouth (Episcopus Portus Magni) is the Ordinary of the Catholic Diocese of Portsmouth in the Province of Southwark, England.

The bishop's official residence is Bishop's House, Bishop Crispian Way, Portsmouth, Hampshire.

The current bishop is Philip Egan, who was ordained bishop at St John's Cathedral, Portsmouth, on 24 September 2012, the Feast of Our Lady of Walsingham. Bishop Egan was previously the Vicar General for the Diocese of Shrewsbury and his appointment was announced by the Holy See on 11 July 2012. The bishop emeritus is the Right Reverend Crispian Hollis, the 7th bishop of Portsmouth, who was appointed on 6 December 1988. He reached retirement age (75) in November 2011, and retired as Bishop on 11 July 2012 upon his successor's appointment. Bishop Hollis acted as Apostolic Administrator of the Diocese of Portsmouth from 11 July 2012 until Bishop Egan's ordination on 24 September 2012.

== History ==
In 1688 the Portsmouth area came under the authority of the Vicar Apostolic of the London District. On the restoration of the Catholic hierarchy in England and Wales in 1850 Portsmouth became part of the Diocese of Southwark. On 19 May 1882 the Catholic Diocese of Portsmouth was created, and consists of the counties of Hampshire and Dorset, together with Berkshire and Oxfordshire south of the River Thames, plus the Isle of Wight and the Channel Islands.

In October 2022 it was announced that the diocese was to reduce from 87 parishes to 24 parishes through a programme of church closures and amalgamations; a move prompted in part by falling attendances and a reduction of over 60% in the number of priests.

== List of the Catholic bishops of Portsmouth ==
Bishops of Portsmouth
From	Until	Incumbent	Notes
1882	1900	John Vertue	Appointed bishop on 3 June 1882 and consecrated on 25 July 1882. Died in office on 23 May 1900.
1900	1910	John Baptist Cahill	Formerly an auxiliary bishop of the Diocese of Portsmouth (March–August 1900). Appointed Bishop of Portsmouth on 30 August 1900. Died in office on 2 August 1910.
1910	1940	William Timothy Cotter	Formerly an auxiliary bishop of the Diocese of Portsmouth (1905–1910). Appointed Bishop of Portsmouth on 24 November 1910. Died in office on 24 October 1940.
1941	1965	John Henry King	Formerly an auxiliary bishop of the Diocese of Portsmouth (1938–1941). Appointed Bishop of Portsmouth on 4 June 1941. Appointed the personal title Archbishop on 6 June 1954. Died in office on 23 March 1965.
1965	1976	Derek Worlock	Appointed Bishop of Portsmouth on 18 October 1965 and consecrated on 21 December 1965. Translated to the archbishopric of Liverpool on 7 February 1976.
1976	1988	Anthony Joseph Emery	Formerly an auxiliary bishop of the Archdiocese of Birmingham (1967–1976). Appointed Bishop of Portsmouth on 13 September 1976. Died on 5 April 1988.
1988	2012	Crispian Hollis	Formerly an auxiliary bishop of the Archdiocese of Birmingham (1987–1988). Appointed Bishop of Portsmouth on 6 December 1988. Retirement accepted on 11 July 2012.
2012	Incumbent	Philip Egan	Formerly Vicar General to the Diocese of Shrewsbury and appointed Bishop of Portsmouth on 11 July 2012. Ordained as the Eighth Bishop of Portsmouth at the Cathedral of St John the Evangelist, Portsmouth, with Bishop Hollis as Principal Consecrator, on 24 September 2012, the Feast of Our Lady of Walsingham.
