= Vatican Information Service =

News agency of the Catholic Church

The Vatican Information Service (VIS) is an official, free news service of the Holy See Press Office, founded in 1991 in the Vatican City during the pontificate of Pope John Paul II. It transmits news on a daily basis at 3 p.m. local Rome time, except during the month of August and on public holidays in Vatican City (generally Holy Days of Obligation).

The service is available in four languages: English, Spanish, French and Italian. The VIS is a freely available service, and invites subscribers from around the world to use their electronic mailing list.

Generally, each VIS broadcast contains information of papal activities, including meetings, appointments, publications and audiences. Periodically the deaths of prelates are announced, as are the activities of the various congregations, councils and synods.

On Saturday 27 June 2015, Pope Francis, through a motu proprio ("on his own initiative") apostolic letter, established in the Roman Curia the Secretariat for Communications. The VIS is expected to eventually be incorporated into it.

== See also ==
- Holy See Press Office
- Vatican News
