= John King (bishop of Portsmouth) =

English prelate of the Catholic Church (1880–1965)

The Most Reverend John Henry King
- Archbishop-Bishop of Portsmouth
- Church: Catholic
- Diocese: Portsmouth
- Appointed: 4 June 1941
- In office: 1941–1965
- Predecessor: William Cotter
- Successor: Derek Worlock
- Previous posts: Titular Bishop of Opus (1938–1941); Auxiliary Bishop of Portsmouth (1938–1941)

Personal details
- Born: 16 September 1880 Wardour, Wiltshire, England
- Died: 23 March 1965 (aged 84) Winchester, Hampshire, England
- Buried: Winchester Catholic Cemetery

Ordination history
History
Priestly ordination
- Ordained by: Jules Prosper París
Episcopal consecration
- Principal consecrator: William Timothy Cotter
- Co-consecrators: Peter Emmanuel Amigo; William Francis Brown
Episcopal succession
Bishops consecrated by John King as principal consecrator
- Thomas Holland: 1960

John Henry King (1880–1965) was an English prelate of the Catholic Church. He served as the fourth Bishop of the Diocese of Portsmouth from 1941 to 1965.

== Life ==
John Henry King was born in Wardour on 16 September 1880. He was ordained at St Helier, Jersey on 20 November 1904 as a priest for the Diocese of Portsmouth.

He was appointed an Auxiliary Bishop of Portsmouth and Titular Bishop of Opus on 28 May 1938. His consecration to the Episcopate took place on 15 July 1938, the principal consecrator was Bishop William Timothy Cotter of Portsmouth, and the principal co-consecrators were Bishop Peter Amigo of Southwark and William Francis Brown, Titular Bishop of Pella and Auxiliary Bishop of Southwark.

Three years later, he was appointed Bishop of Portsmouth on 4 June 1941. On 6 June 1954, he was appointed the personal title Archbishop.

King died in office on 23 March 1965, aged 84. He is buried at the Winchester Catholic Cemetery.

Catholic Church titles
Preceded by William Timothy Cotter	Bishop of Portsmouth; 1941–1965	Succeeded by Derek John Worlock
