= William Cotter (bishop) =

Irish-born prelate

The Right Reverend William Timothy Cotter
- Bishop of Portsmouth
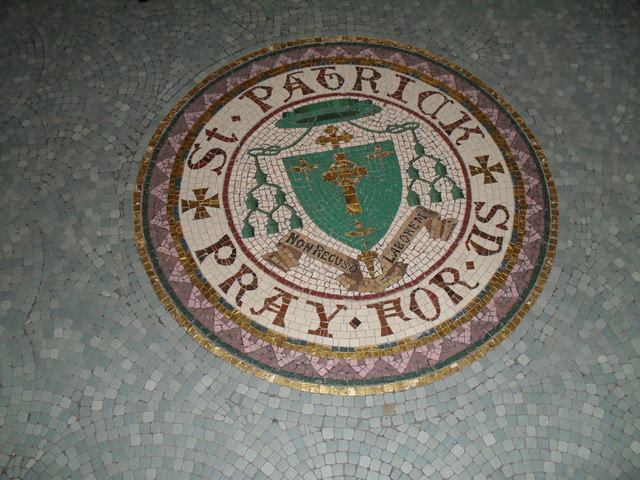
- Church: Roman Catholic
- Diocese: Portsmouth
- Appointed: 24 November 1910
- In office: 1910-1940
- Predecessor: John Cahill
- Successor: John King
- Previous post: Auxiliary Bishop of Portsmouth (1905-1910)

Orders
- Ordination: 19 June 1892
- Consecration: 19 March 1905 by John Cahill
- Rank: Bishop

Personal details
- Born: 21 December 1866 Cloyne, County Cork, Ireland
- Died: 24 October 1940 (aged 73)

William Timothy Cotter (1866–1940) was an Irish-born prelate who served as the third Roman Catholic Bishop of Portsmouth, England, from 1910 to 1940.

== Life ==
William Timothy Cotter was born in Cloyne, County Cork, Ireland on 21 December 1866. He was educated at St. Colman's Fermoy; and studied for the priesthood at Maynooth College. Cotter was ordained to the priesthood on 19 June 1892 at Portsmouth.

He was appointed an Auxiliary Bishop of Portsmouth and Titular Bishop of Clazomenae on 14 February 1905. His consecration to the Episcopate took place on 19 March 1905, the principal consecrator was Bishop John Baptist Cahill of Portsmouth, and the principal co-consecrators were Bishop George Ambrose Burton of Clifton and Bishop Peter Amigo of Southwark. Five years later, he was appointed Bishop of Portsmouth on 24 November 1910.

Bishop Cotter died in office on 24 October 1940, aged 73.

Catholic Church titles
Preceded by John Baptist Cahill	Bishop of Portsmouth; 1910–1940	Succeeded by John Henry King
