= Roman Catholic Diocese of Portsmouth =

Catholic diocese in England

Diocese of Portsmouth Dioecesis Portus Magni

Catholic
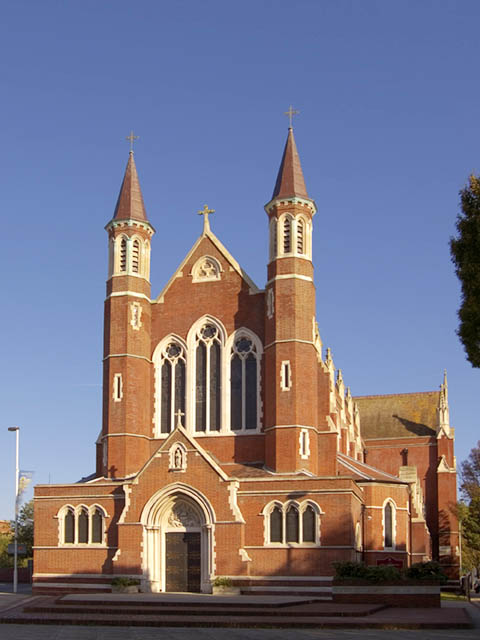
- St John's Cathedral, Portsmouth

- Coat of arms

Location
- Country: England; Bailiwick of Guernsey; Bailiwick of Jersey
- Territory: Hampshire; Berkshire; The Channel Islands
- Ecclesiastical province: Southwark
- Deaneries: 24 (Pastoral Areas)
- Coordinates: 50.799°N 1.091°W

Statistics
- Area: 6,339 km^{2} (2,448 sq mi)
- Population: Total; Catholics: (as of 2024); 3.8 Million; 235,000
- Parishes: 87
- Churches: 135
- Schools: 70

Information
- Denomination: Roman Catholic
- Sui iuris church: Latin Church
- Rite: Roman Rite
- Established: 19 May 1882
- Cathedral: Cathedral of St John the Evangelist, Portsmouth
- Patron saint: St Edmund of Abingdon; The Immaculate Conception; St Pier Giorgio Frassati
- Secular priests: 115

Current leadership
- Pope: Leo XIV
- Bishop: Philip Egan
- Metropolitan Archbishop: John Wilson
- Vicar General: James McAuley; David Hopgood
- Episcopal Vicars: Mark Hogan; Paul James (PJ) Smith; Benjamin Theobald; Gaston Afah
- Bishops emeritus: Crispian Hollis

Map
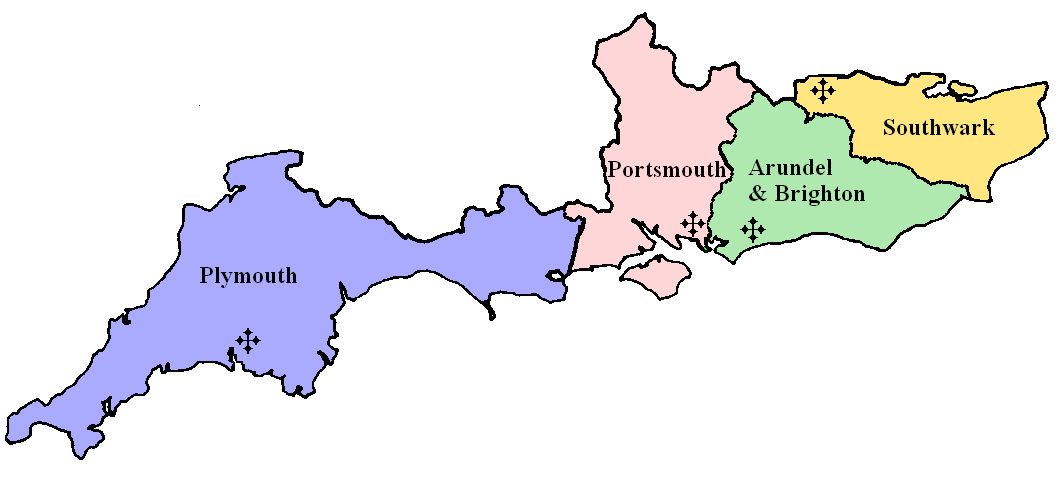
- The diocese within the Province of Southwark. The Channel Islands are not shown.

Website
- portsmouthdiocese.org.uk

The Roman Catholic Diocese of Portsmouth (Latin: Dioecesis Portus Magni) is a Latin diocese of the Catholic Church that covers the historic counties of Hampshire and Berkshire in England, and the Channel Islands. The episcopal see is St John's Cathedral in Portsmouth and is headed by the Bishop of Portsmouth. The diocese is part of the metropolitan Province of Southwark, which covers all of the far South of England as well as the Channel Islands.

== Location ==
The Diocese of Portsmouth, situated centrally within the Metropolitan Province of Southwark, extending as far as Abingdon in the North; and down to and including the Channel Islands in the South, and roughly from Liphook in the East to Andover in the West. The diocese adjoins the dioceses of Birmingham and Northampton to the North, the diocese of Arundel & Brighton to the East and the dioceses of Plymouth and Clifton to the West. It comprises the historic counties of Hampshire and Berkshire — which includes Bournemouth, Christchurch, the Vale of White Horse, and the Isle of Wight — along with Guernsey and Jersey.

The area of the Diocese of Portsmouth is 6,339 km^{2} (2,447sq miles) with a total population (2024) of 3.8M. Its estimated Catholic population (2024) is 235,000. There are 87 parishes in 24 Pastoral Areas (2024) and 115 priests and 40 Deacons in active ministry, plus 101 professed, non-priest religious and 255 professed women religious. Education comprises 70 schools.

== History ==
By a Papal Brief dated 19 May 1882, Pope Leo XIII created the Diocese of Portsmouth. It was formed out of the western portion of the Diocese of Southwark, as constituted at the re-establishment of the hierarchy in 1850. The Southwark diocese had become too large for one bishop, extending as it did from London to Bournemouth and from the outskirts of Oxford to Dover and including the Channel Islands.

The new diocese comprised the counties of Hampshire, the Isle of Wight, Berkshire, and the Channel Islands. It was thus almost co-terminous with the limits of the (Anglican) Diocese of Winchester. The obvious place for the cathedral and curia of the new diocese was Winchester. The Ecclesiastical Titles Act forbade a Catholic diocese to have the same name as an Anglican see. It would appear that the original intention was to fix the see at Southampton, with St Joseph Church in Bugle Street as the pro-cathedral. The construction of a large parish church in the centre of Portsmouth had begun, and it was decided to make it the future cathedral of the diocese.

Bishop Vertue was succeeded by his vicar-general John Cahill. During Cahill's tenure a number of religious orders established houses in the diocese. In 1901 Benedictines from Solesmes Abbey settled on the Isle of Wight. Benedictine nuns established St Cecilia's Abbey, Ryde. Benedictine monks from the monastery of St. Edmund's, in Douai, France, came to Upper Woolhampton and founded Douai Abbey in 1903 when the community left France as a result of anti-clerical legislation.

== Bishops ==
John Vertue (1826–1900) was appointed the first bishop of the new diocese. He was consecrated by Cardinal Manning on 25 July 1882 and on 10 August of that year opened the Cathedral of St John the Evangelist at Portsmouth. When the new bishop took possession of his see, he had about seventy priests and forty missions.

Since 1900 the diocese has had seven bishops: John Cahill, 1900–1910; William Cotter (who came from Cloyne in Co. Cork), 1910–1940; John Henry King (who was given the personal title of archbishop in 1954), 1941–1965; Derek Worlock (translated to Liverpool as Archbishop 7 February 1976), 1965–1976; Anthony Emery, 1976–1988; Crispian Hollis, 1988–2012; Philip Egan, 2012-.

=== Current bishop ===
On 11 July 2012, Egan's appointment as the eighth Bishop of Portsmouth was announced in an official press release from the Vatican Information Service (VIS), an arm of the Holy See Press Office. At the time of his appointment Bishop Egan was serving as the Vicar General of the Diocese of Shrewsbury. Bishop Egan's Episcopal Ordination took place at St John's Cathedral, Portsmouth, on Monday 24 September 2012, the Feast of Our Lady of Walsingham.

Egan was born on 14 November 1955 in Altrincham, a suburb of Manchester. After classical studies locally at St. Ambrose College and at King's College London, he completed training for the priesthood at Allen Hall, Westminster, and at the Venerable English College in Rome. On 4 August 1984, he was ordained to the priesthood for the Diocese of Shrewsbury. From 1984 to 1988, Egan served as parochial vicar at St. Anthony's, Woodehouse Park, Manchester. From 1988 to 1991, he served as an assistant chaplain at the University of Cambridge. From 1991 to 1994, he served as parish vicar and chaplain at Arrowe Park Hospital on the Wirral. From 1994 to 1995, he completed theological studies at Boston College in the United States, going on to serve, until 2007, as a professor of fundamental theology and dean of studies at Oscott College seminary in Birmingham. In 2007–2008, also in Boston he attended Lonergan post-doctoral fellowship Studies. In 2008, Egan became parish priest of Our Lady and St Christopher's in Stockport. In 2010, he was named to his previous post as Vicar General of the Diocese of Shrewsbury.

=== Emeritus bishop ===
Roger Francis Crispian Hollis, bishop emeritus of Portsmouth, was educated at Stonyhurst College and ordained on 11 July 1965.

He was installed as bishop of Portsmouth on 27 January 1989. He had been chairman of the Catholic Media Trust and chairman of the Bishops' Committee for Europe. He is a member of the Pontifical Council for Social Communications in the Vatican. He is the chairman of the Bishops' Conference Department of Mission and Unity, representative for the Bishops' Conference of the Churches Together in Britain and Ireland, and a member of IARCCUM (International Anglican Roman Catholic Committee for Unity and Mission).

He reached the standard retirement age of 75 in November 2011.

On 11 July 2012, the acceptance of his resignation was announced in an official press release from the Vatican Information Service (VIS), an arm of the Holy See Press Office.

=== Coadjutor Bishop ===
- Thomas Holland (1960–1964), did not succeed to see; appointed Bishop of Salford

=== Auxiliary Bishops ===
- John Baptist Cahill (1900–1904), appointed Bishop here
- William Timothy Cotter (1905–1910), appointed Bishop here
- John Henry King (1938–1941), appointed Bishop here

=== Other priests of this diocese who became bishops ===
- Peter John Haworth Doyle, appointed Bishop of Northampton in 2005
- David Keane, appointed Bishop of Limerick, Ireland in 1923
- Declan Ronan Lang, appointed Bishop of Clifton in 2001
- Cormac Murphy-O'Connor, appointed Bishop of Arundel and Brighton in 1977; future Cardinal

== Clergy ==
=== Bishops ===
- Right Rev Philip Egan BA STL PHD, Bishop
- Right Rev Crispian Hollis, Bishop Emeritus

=== Bishop's Secretary ===
- Rev Anthony Fyk (Diocesan Master of Ceremonies)

=== Bishop's Executive Assistant ===
- Rev Deacon Craig Aburn

=== Bishop's Council ===
==== Vicars General ====
- Rev Mgr Canon David Hopgood VG, Vicar for the Clergy
- Rev Canon James McAuley VG, Dean of the Cathedral

==== Episcopal Vicars ====
- Rev Canon Paul James (PJ) Smith, EpV for Education
- Rev Benjamin Theobald, EpV for Vocations
- Rev Gaston Forbah Afah, EpV for Evangelisation
- Rev Mark Hogan, EpV for Parish Mission Development

=== Canons of the Cathedral Chapter ===
==== Provost ====
- Rev Mgr Canon David Hopgood VG

==== Canons ====
- Rev Mgr Canon John Nelson
- Rev Canon James McAuley VG
- Rev Canon PJ Smith EpV
- Rev Canon Mark Hogan EpV
- Rev Canon Simon Thomson JV
- Rev Canon John Cooke
- Rev Canon Michael Dennehy
- Rev Canon Dominic Golding KCHS
- Rev Canon Christopher Rutledge KHS
- Rev Canon Christopher Heaps

==== Provost Emeriti ====
- Rev Canon Gerard Hetherington KCHS

==== Canons Emeriti ====
- Rev Mgr Canon Paul Townsend
- Rev Mgr Canon Jeremy Garratt
- Rev Mgr Canon Vincent Harvey
- Rev Canon Alan Griffiths
- Rev Canon David Mahy
- Rev Canon John O'Shea
- Rev Canon Michael Hore
- Rev Canon Peter Turbitt

=== Moderator of the Curia ===
- Rev Canon James McAuley VG

=== Chancellor ===
- Rev Steven Restori

=== Diocesan Tribunal ===
==== Judicial Vicar ====
- Rev Canon Simon Thomson JV
- Rev Deacon Craig Aburn (Administrator and Assistant to JV)

==== Judges ====
- Rev Benjamin Theobald EpV
- Rev Canon Dominic Golding KCHS
- Rev John Humphreys
- Rev Wojciech Paszko

== Deaneries ==
Until 2006 the diocese was organised into the deaneries of Portsmouth, Aldershot, Alton, Basingstoke, Bournemouth, Fareham, Havant, New Forest, Southampton, Winchester, North East Berks, South Berks, Kennet Valley, Vale of the White Horse, Reading, Isle of Wight, Guernsey and Jersey. Following a period of consultation, the deaneries were replaced with 24 new pastoral areas at Pentecost 2006, with the aim to eventually turn them into parishes in the future. Deaneries were re-introduced in September 2014.

== Pilgrimage ==
The Portsmouth Diocese is part of the Catholic Association Pilgrimage.

== See also ==
- Catholic Church in England and Wales
- List of Catholic churches in the United Kingdom
- Catholic Church in Guernsey
