= Hansom (surname) =

Hansom is a surname. Notable people with the surname include:

- Charles Francis Hansom (1816–1888), an English architect
- Joseph Hansom (1803–1882), an English architect and inventor
- Joseph Stanislaus Hansom (1845 –1931), an English architect
- Edward Joseph Hansom (1842–1900), an English architect
