= St George's Roman Catholic Church, York =

Listed church in York, England

St George's Roman Catholic Church
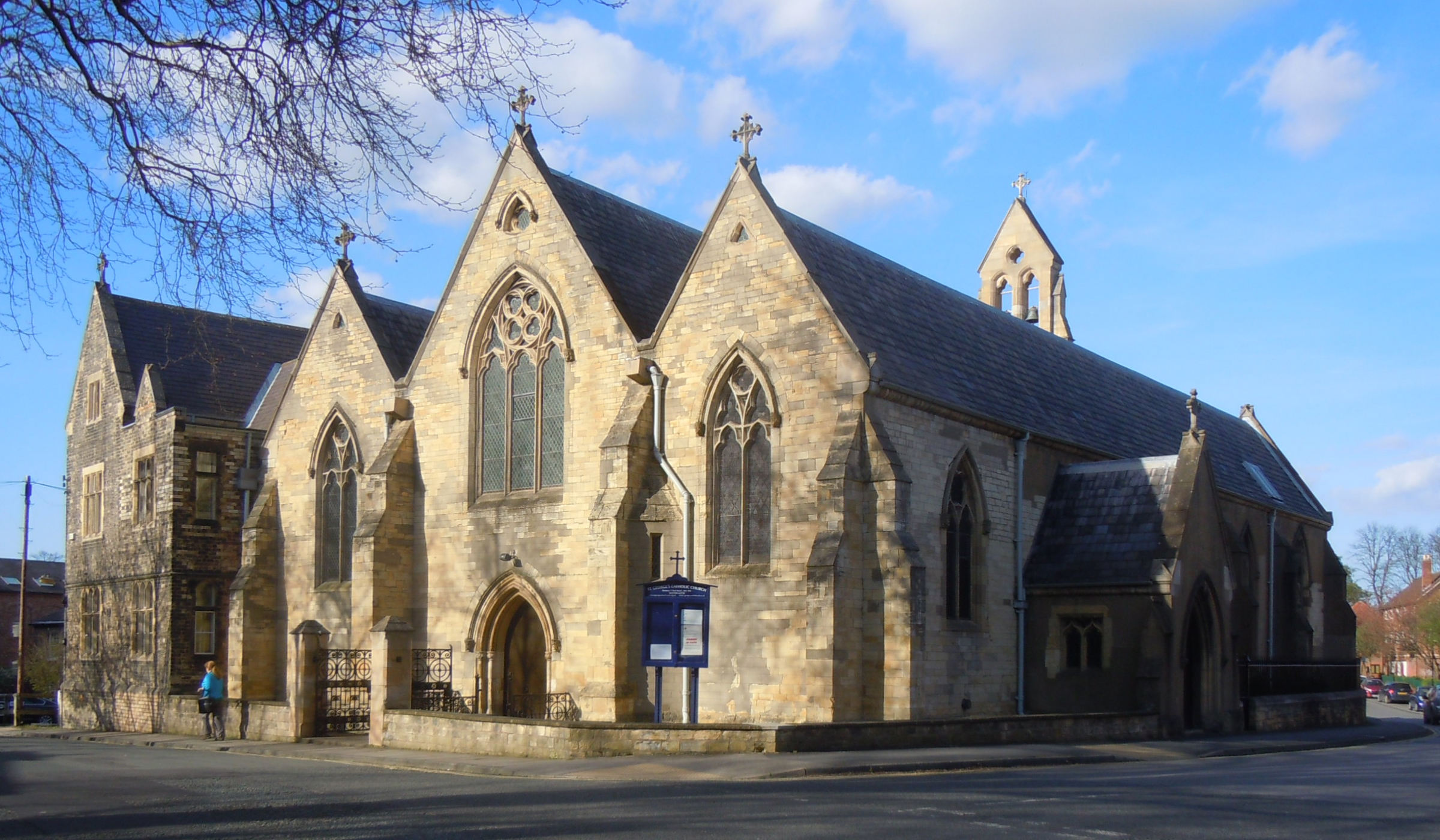
- The church in 2016
- St George's Roman Catholic Church
- 53.955180°N 1.075158°W
- OS grid reference: SE 60786 51410
- Address: George Street, York
- Country: England
- Denomination: Roman Catholic
- Website: stgeorgeschurch-york.org.uk

Architecture
- Heritage designation: Grade II listed
- Architect(s): Joseph and Charles Francis Hansom
- Years built: 1849–50

Administration
- Diocese: Middlesbrough

Clergy
- Priest: Very Rev. Canon Jeremiah Twomey

St George's Roman Catholic Church is a Grade II listed church on George Street in the city centre of York, England, in the Diocese of Middlesbrough. The church was designed by Joseph Hansom and was the first pro-Cathedral of the Diocese of Beverley.

== History ==
The church takes its title from the medieval church of St George at Beanhills which was suppressed in 1547. The churchyard may still be seen opposite the present Catholic church and is the supposed burial place of Dick Turpin, the notorious 18th-century highwayman.

A building fund of £1,200 had been raised to build a new church in York. This was to replace a brick chapel that was situated in Little Blake Street (now Duncombe Place). St George's was chiefly built to serve the immigrant Irish Catholic population of Walmgate. Opened in September 1850, it served as the pro-Cathedral of the Diocese of Beverley until St Wilfrid's opened in 1864.

On 24 June 1983, St George's was designated a Grade II listed building.

== Architecture ==
The church was designed by Joseph Hansom and his brother, Charles Francis Hansom in the Early Decorated style. The foundation stone was laid on 25 October 1849 and the building completed the following September. Joseph Hansom also designed the presbytery in 1858.

The altar is of Caen stone and was moved forward from its original position in 1972. Another notable feature is the Rood Screen, a fine wood carving of Flemish work now positioned over the sacristy door. The East Window is based upon a Pugin design and the memorial windows of the Lady chapel were made and decorated by the Barrett family, and financed by the Palmes family of Naburn, the Dolmans of Pocklington and the Coxes of Herefordshire.

== Interior decoration ==
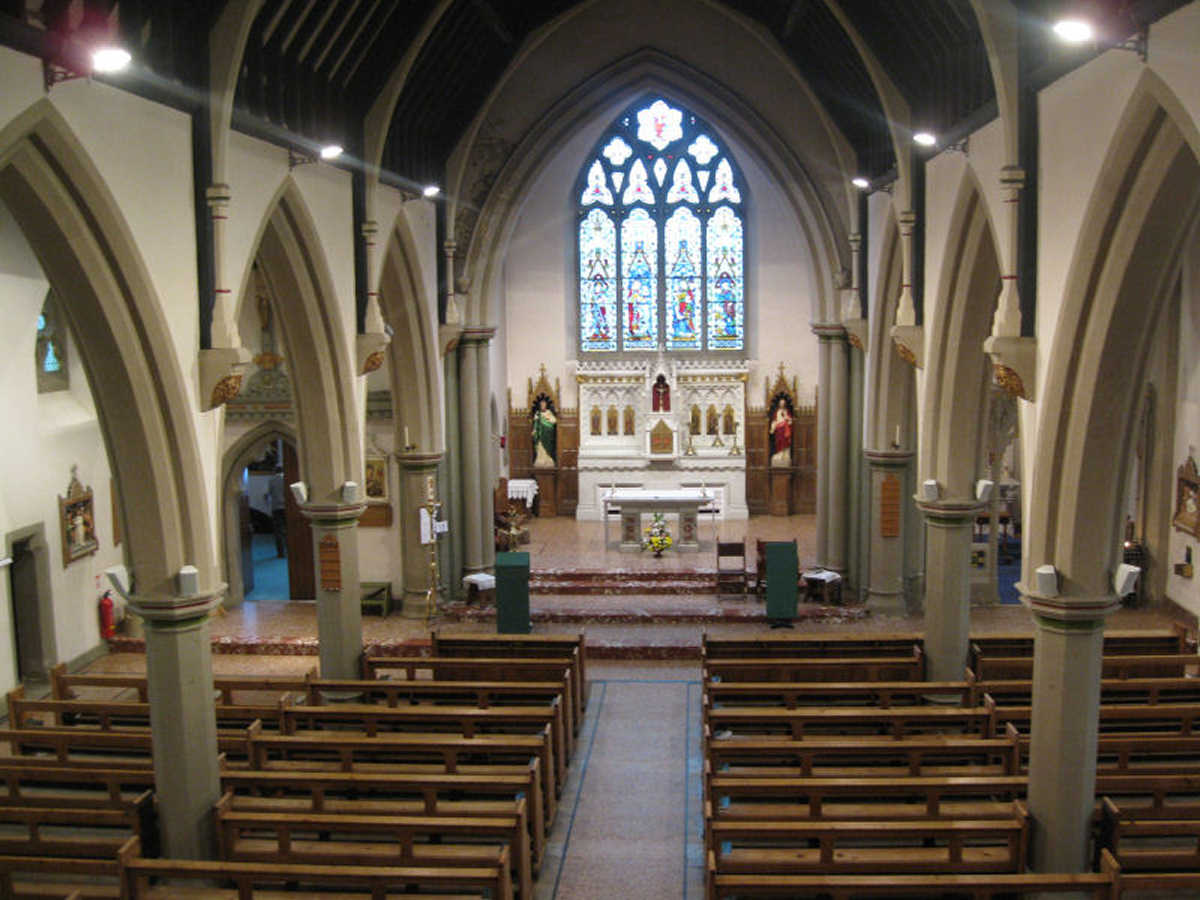

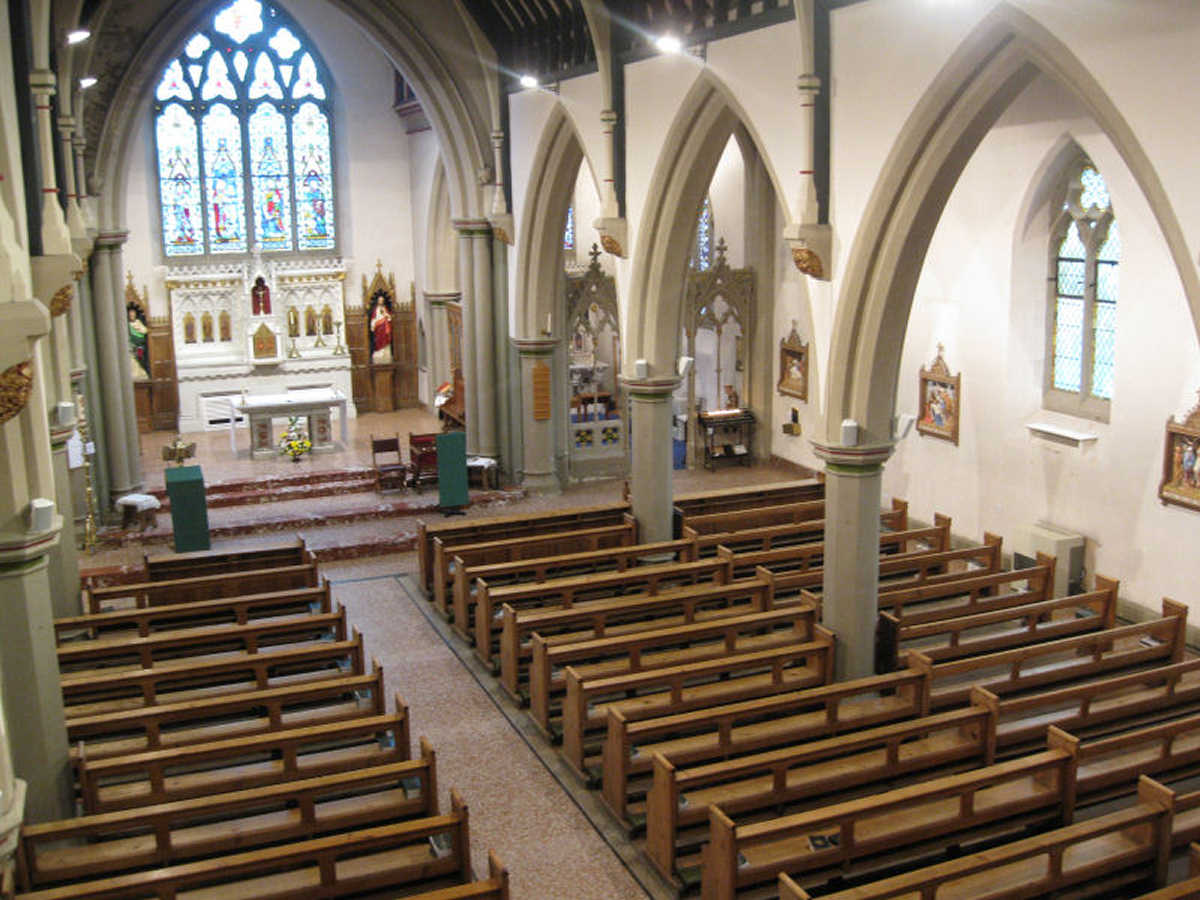

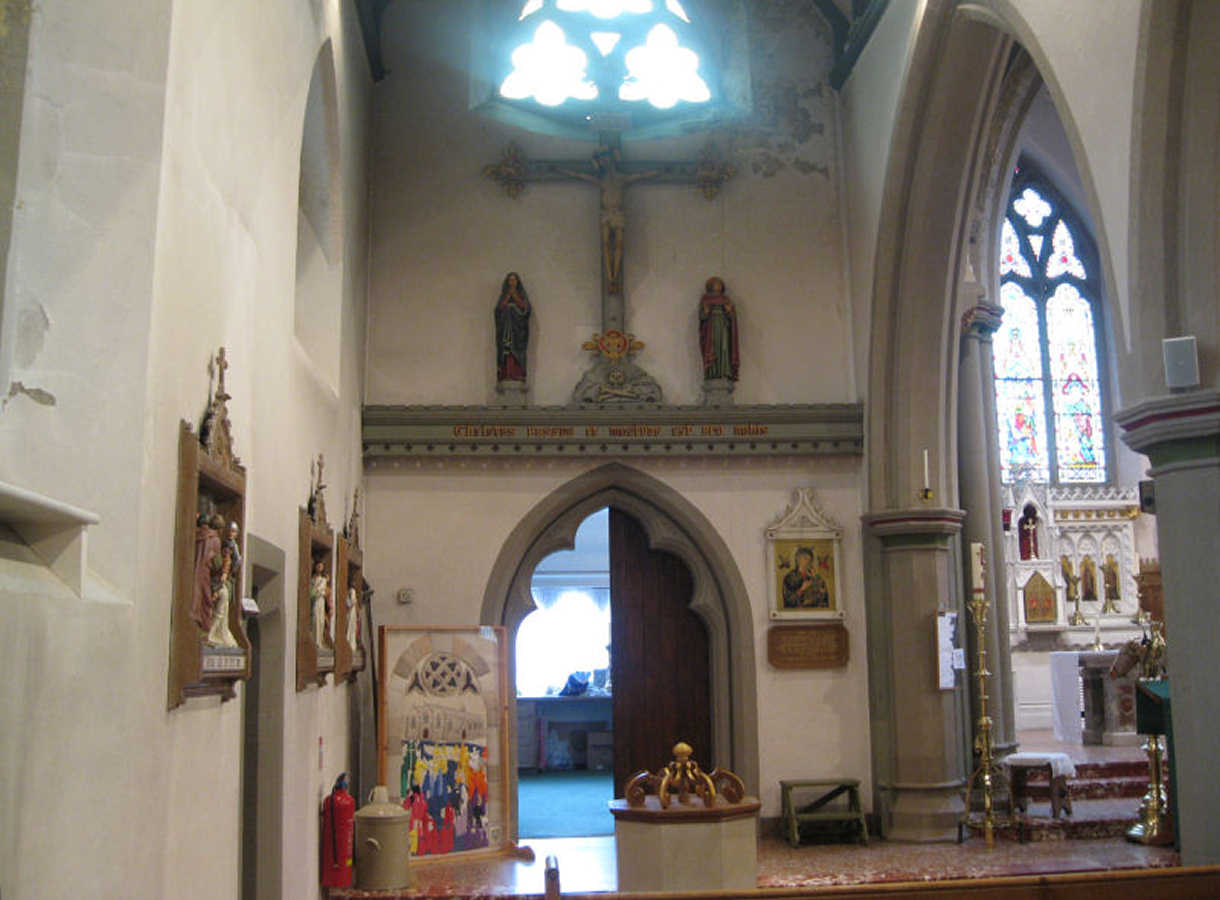
- Reredos
- Altar
- Lady Chapel
- Stations of the Cross

== Current parish priests ==
- Very Rev. Canon Jeremiah Twomey

== Former parish priests ==
- Rev Fr. Patrick Hartnett
- Rev Fr. Timothy Bywater
- Rev Fr. Austin O'Neal
- Very Rev. Canon Alan Sheridan

== Organ ==
The organ was restored in 2004 and is the oldest in the city.

== Schools ==
Associated with the church were Primary (mixed) and Secondary (boys) schools. The primary school was established in 1852 and relocated in 1977 to Fishergate, whilst the secondary school closed in 1985. Both were located on Margaret Street.

== See also ==
- Listed buildings in York (within the city walls, southern part)
