= Our Lady and St Joseph's Church, Carlisle =

Coordinates: 54.8938°N 2.9269°W

Our Lady and St Joseph
- Church of Our Lady and St Joseph
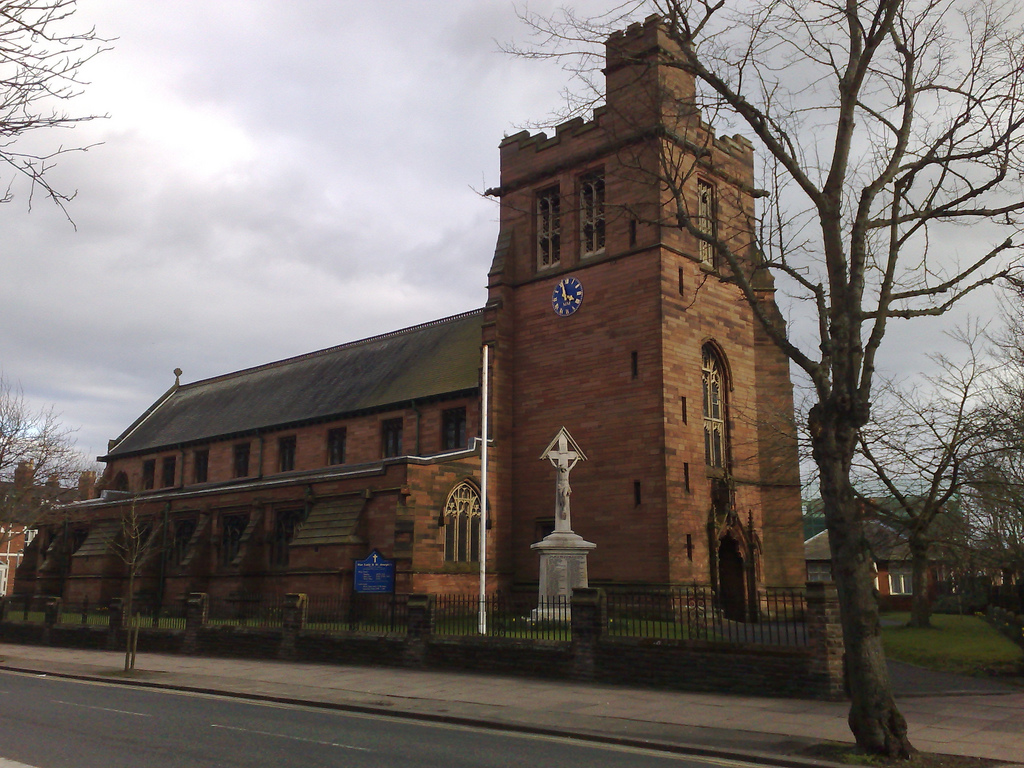

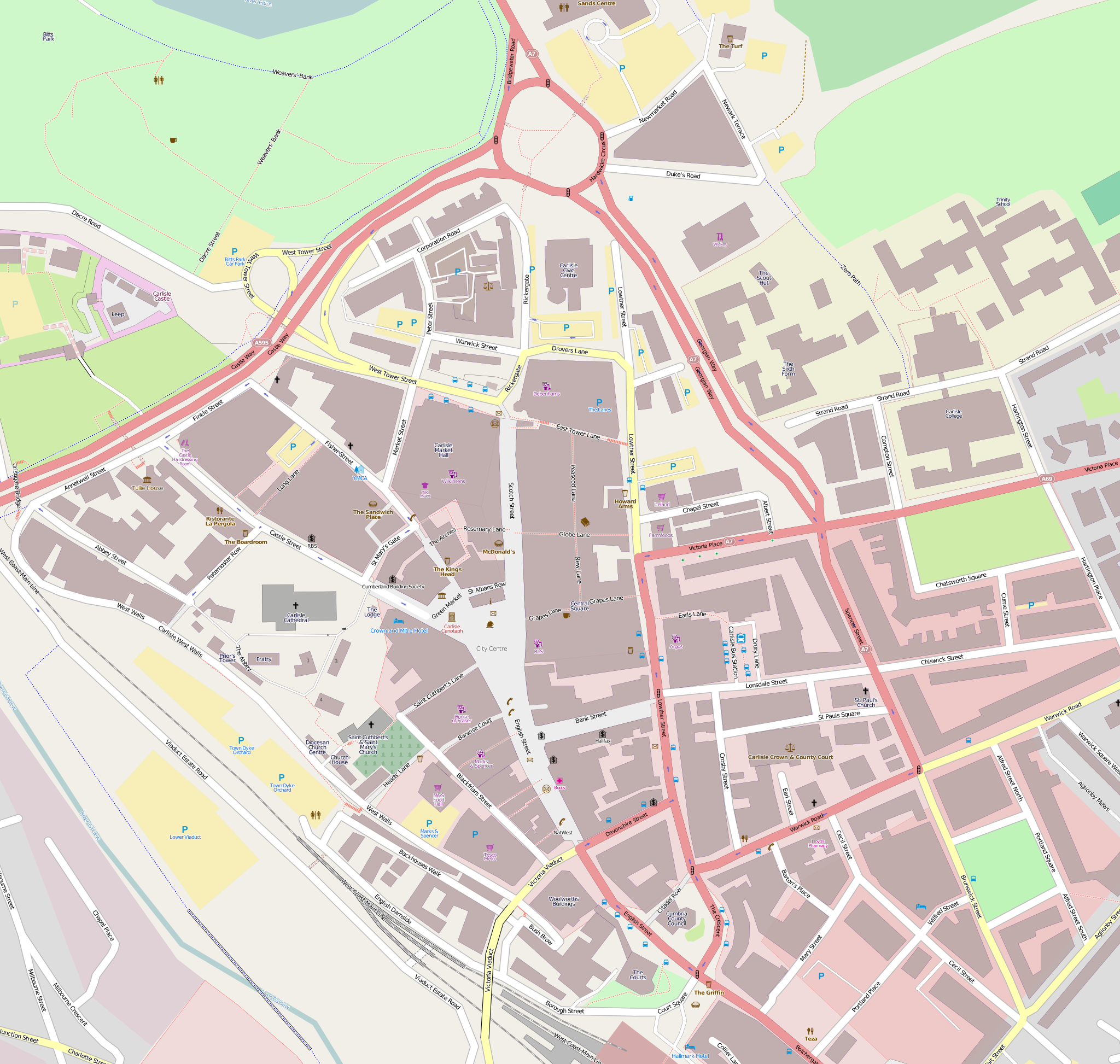
- Location in Carlisle
- OS grid reference: NY 40646 55850
- Location: Carlisle, Cumbria
- Country: England
- Denomination: Roman Catholic
- Website: CarlisleCatholicChurch.org

History
- Status: Parish church

Architecture
- Functional status: Active
- Heritage designation: Grade II listed
- Designated: 11 April 1994
- Architect: Dunn, Hansom & Dunn
- Style: Gothic Revival
- Groundbreaking: 18 May 1891
- Completed: 1893
- Construction cost: $12,000

Administration
- Province: Liverpool
- Diocese: Lancaster
- Deanery: North Cumbria
- Parish: Our Lady of Perpetual Help

Our Lady and St Joseph's Church, is a Roman Catholic church in Carlisle, Cumbria. The church is one of seven churches that make up the city and district parish of Our Lady of Perpetual Help, Carlisle. It was built from 1891 to 1893. It is situated on the junction of Warwick Road and Warwick Square in the centre of the city. The church is a Grade II listed building.

== History ==
=== Foundation ===
In 1798, a Roman Catholic chapel was founded in Carlisle by the Fairburn Family on the West Walls. In 1800, a Catholic mission started, supported by the local community. The priest was Joseph Marshall.

In the 1820s, with the Catholic population of the city increasing, plans were drawn up to build a church. From 1824 to 1825, one was built on Chapel Street. By the 1870s, this too became too small for the growing congregation, so in 1879, a larger church was planned.

=== Construction ===
The foundation stone was laid on 18 May 1891 and the church was opened in 1893. The site of the church, Warwick Square, was owned by the Duke of Devonshire. At the time, the cost of building the church came to £12,000. It was designed by Dunn, Hansom and Dunn. Archibald Matthias Dunn, his son Archibald Manuel Dunn and Edward Joseph Hansom also designed Our Lady and the English Martyrs Church in Cambridge.

== Parish ==
On 15 February 2014, Michael Campbell, Bishop of Lancaster, raised Our Lady and St Joseph's church to the status of a collegiate church, by this he established a group of diocesan priests to live and work in community under the title of the Canons of St Ambrose and St Charles Borromeo. In 2016, the church's status reverted and is currently served by priests from the Diocese of Lancaster. The church, together with Our Lady and St Wilfrid's Church, Warwick Bridge, and St Ninian's Chapel in Brampton merged to become Our Lady of Eden Parish and this parish has since formed part of the new city and district parish of Our Lady of Perpetual Help which was formed by Bishop Paul Swarbrick on 1 November 2020.

The church has two Masses on Sunday: 10:00am and 4:30pm.

== See also ==
- Media related to Our Lady and St Joseph's Catholic Church, Carlisle at Wikimedia Commons
