= St John's Church, Bath =

Church in Somerset, England

St John the Evangelist Roman Catholic Church
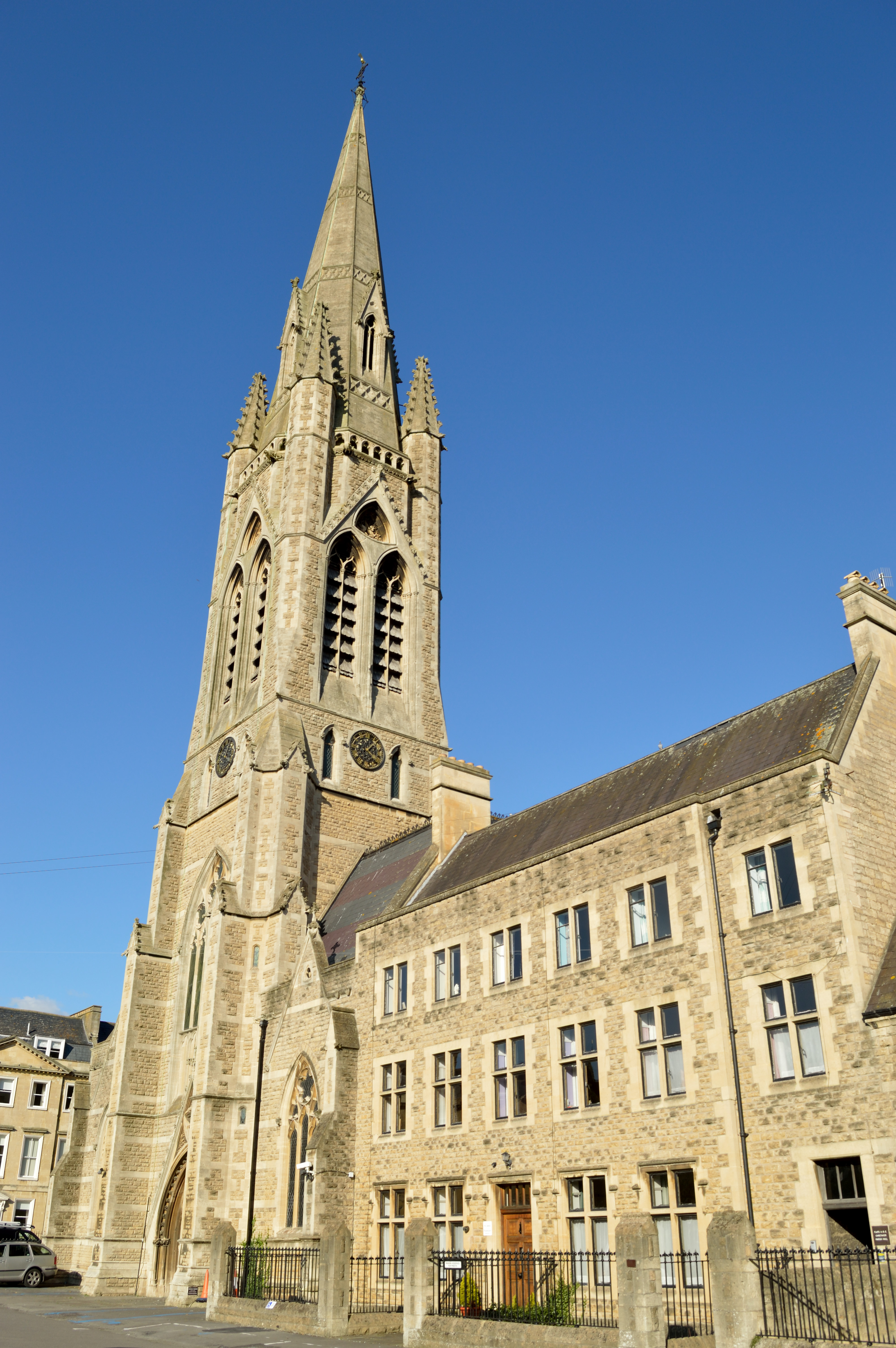
- St John's Church, with parish hall and office

- Location within Somerset Location within England
- 51°22′47″N 2°21′20″W
- Location: Bath
- Country: England
- Denomination: Catholic Church
- Website: www.stjohnsrcbath.org.uk

History
- Dedication: St John the Evangelist

Architecture
- Architect: Charles Francis Hansom
- Style: Victorian architecture
- Groundbreaking: 1861
- Completed: 1863, spire: 1867

Administration
- Province: Ecclesiastical province of Birmingham
- Metropolis: Archdiocese of Birmingham
- Diocese: Diocese of Clifton
- Deanery: St Oliver Plunkett

Clergy
- Dean: Canon Thomas Finnegan
- Priest: Canon Christopher Whitehead

St. John the Evangelist Roman Catholic Church is located on the South Parade in the south-east section of Bath City Centre – the old Ham District where John Wood the Elder, the Georgian architect, had originally planned his gigantic "Forum".

== Architecture ==
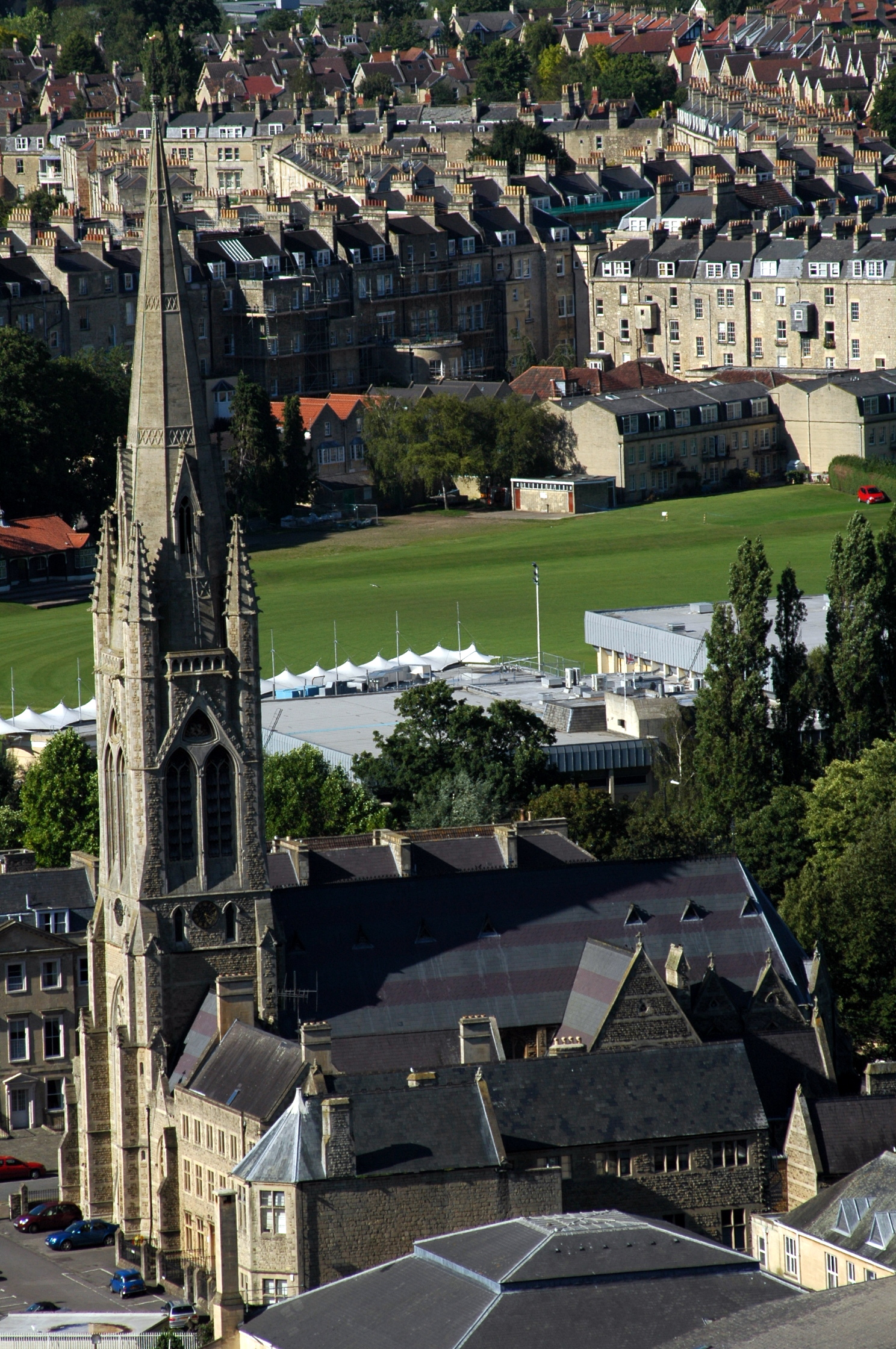
St John's Church viewed from Beechen Cliff

The decorative Gothic-style spire dominates the city's skyline, which has irked some people, such as noted architectural critic Nikolaus Pevsner, who accuses the church of being "a demonstrative proof of how intensely the Gothicists hated the Georgians of Bath." Christopher Martin takes a more measured view in his work on English Catholic churches, commenting "the stately interior is a good reflection of mid-Victorian taste", and remarking on the colourful polished marble, the exquisite screen, the blazing and triumphant white tabernacle, the delicate communion rails, a series of references to St John, and the chapels, each with something to admire.

The structure was designed and built between 1861-3 by Charles Francis Hansom, who was the brother of J. A. Hansom, the creator of the Hansom cab, and had formerly done the village church at Hanley Swan. The brothers also prepared designs for Woodchester Mansion in Nympsfield, Gloucestershire, after A. W. N. Pugin had resigned from the project. For this reason, they are often quoted as the second-best Roman Catholic architects of their day, for their success in securing commissions that Pugin had passed over. They also designed the Woodchester Mansion's north service wing in the same Gothic style.

The walls are of Bath stone. The church's 222-foot (68 m) spire was added by Hansom in 1867. The baptistery, a shrine containing the relics of Saint Justina of Padua, was designed by Edward Joseph Hansom, his son, in 1871.

The brothers considered the church to be one of their best works. Pevsner's typical terse description describes the church as follows:

Lofty tower with spire and spirelets. Ambitious aisled nave with clerestory, transepts, and broad polygonal apse with side apses. The exterior is rock-faced, and the interior is circular pink granite piers with elaborate foliated capitals. – SCREEN of iron. – STAINED GLASS. In the rose windows, quite good and glowing. The screen and glass are by Hardman. – VESTMENTS. Genuine C15 vestments are in use at St. John's.

== History ==
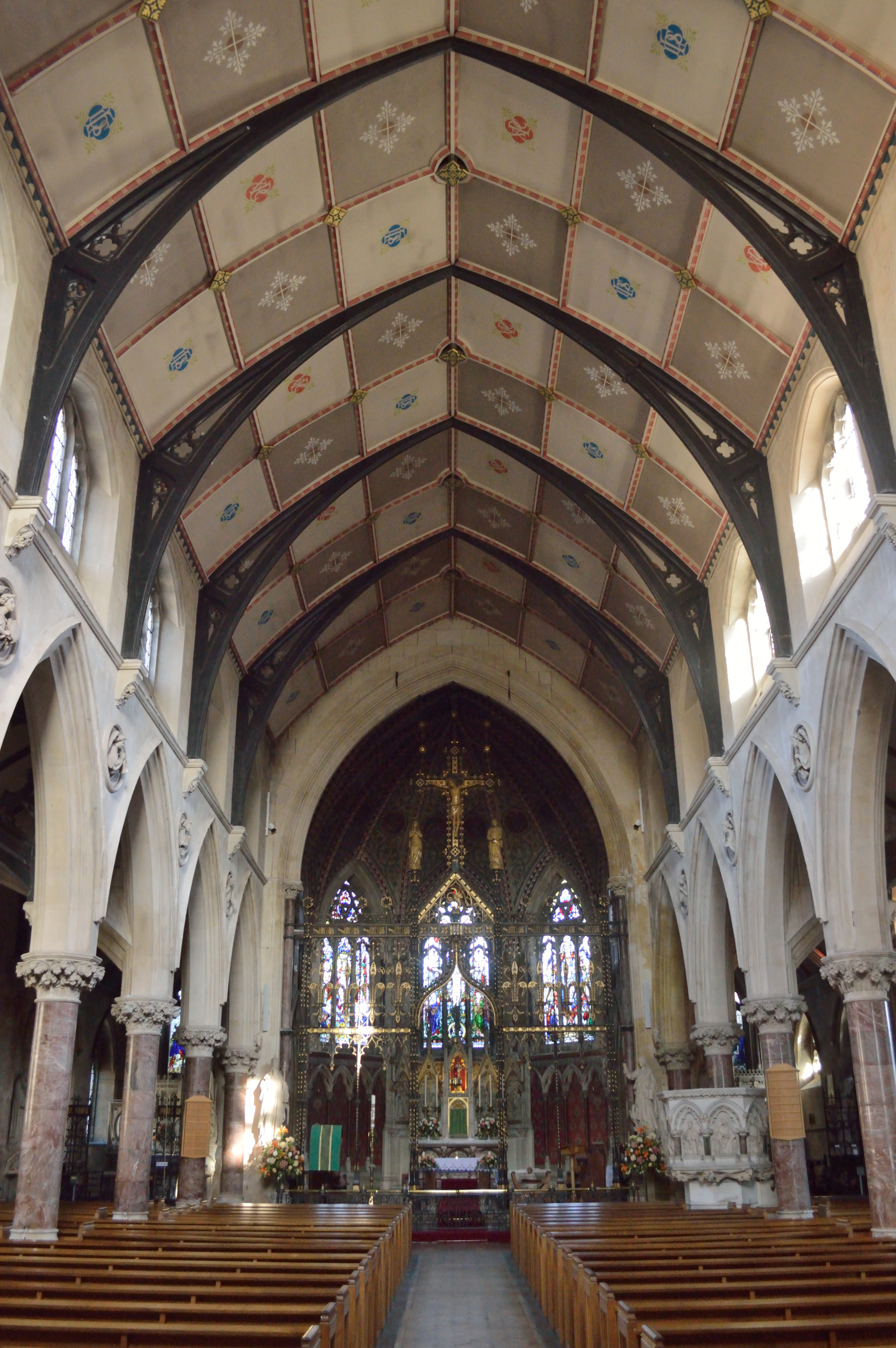
Interior of the church

The church was built by the Benedictines based at Downside Abbey, which accounts for the substantial ancillary buildings intended to accommodate a small community of priests. It was handed over to the Diocese of Clifton in 1932.

The building was bombed in 1942: four people died, and the south aisle was destroyed, but subsequently rebuilt in a similar Gothic style. The inscription commemorating this event is in Latin: "Hostili incursione diruta...".

The steeple provides a nest for a breeding pair of peregrine falcons. The nesting site is monitored by a publicly viewable webcam.

== Parish ==
The parish lies within the Roman Catholic Diocese of Clifton and is one of four in the City of Bath. There are currently three priests, one a Pole who celebrates Mass in his own tongue each Sunday for the local Polish community. The parish priest, Fr. Christopher Whitehead, celebrated twenty years of priestly ministry in 2019 and began as Parish Priest in September 2019.

== Notable people ==
- Albert Ham (1858–1940), was a boy chorister at St John's prior to being appointed sub-organist at the church in 1875. Later had a distinguished career as an organist, conductor, and composer in Canada.
