= St Dominic's Church, Newcastle =

St Dominic's Church
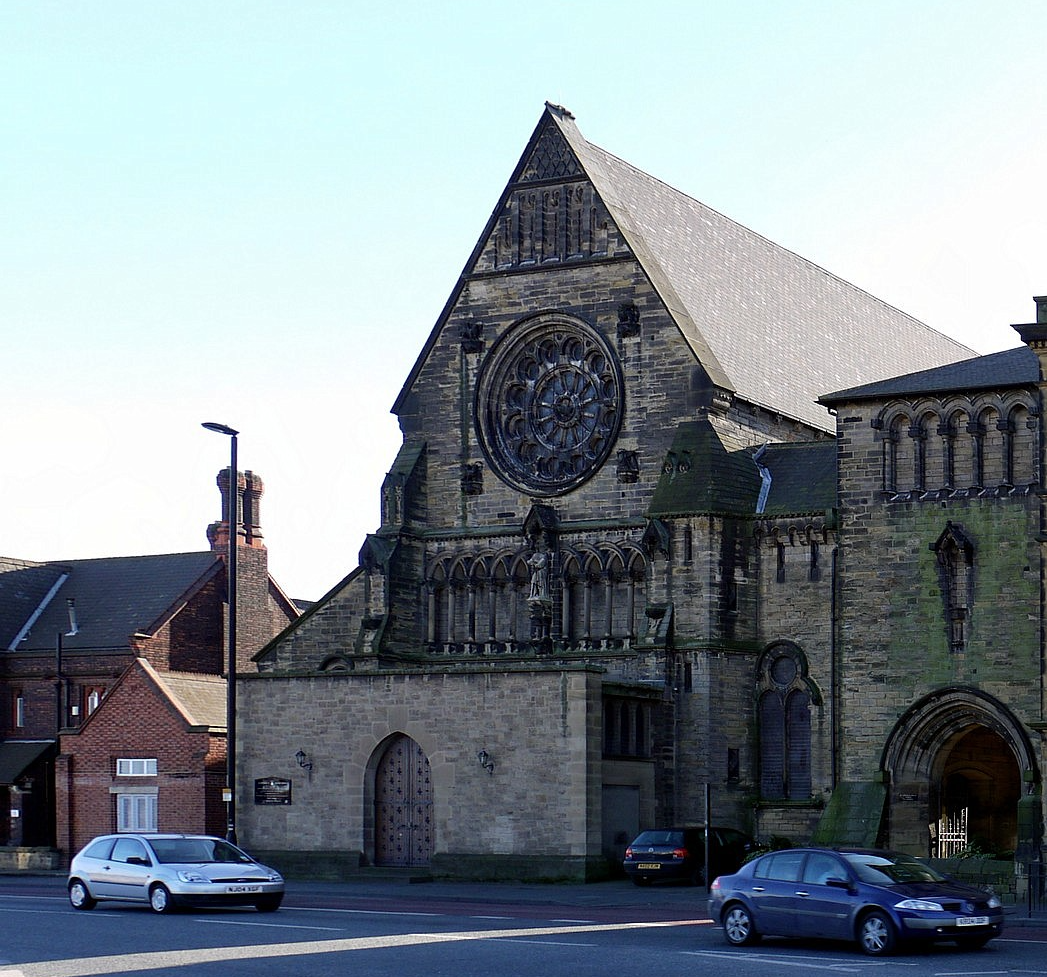
- St Dominic's Church
- 54.9742°N 1.5979°W
- OS grid reference: NZ 25838 64477
- Location: Newcastle-upon-Tyne
- Country: England
- Denomination: Catholic
- Website: StDominicsCatholicChurch.org.uk

History
- Former name: St Dominic's Priory Church
- Dedication: Saint Dominic

Architecture
- Functional status: Active
- Heritage designation: Grade II listed
- Designated: 17 December 1971
- Architect: Archibald Matthias Dunn
- Groundbreaking: 1869
- Completed: 11 September 1873
- Construction cost: £15,000

Administration
- Diocese: Hexham and Newcastle
- Deanery: Newcastle City

St Dominic's Church, formerly St Dominic's Priory Church, is a Roman Catholic Parish church in Newcastle-upon-Tyne. It was built from 1869 and opened in 1873. It was founded by the Dominican Order. It is located on New Bridge Street, east of Manors railway station, in the Ouseburn area of Newcastle. It was designed by Archibald Matthias Dunn and is a Grade II listed building.

== History ==
=== Foundation ===
In 1239, Blackfriars, Newcastle upon Tyne was established by the Dominican Order. However, in 1536, with the Dissolution of the Monasteries, the building was demolished. In 1798, St Andrew's Church, the first post-Reformation Catholic Church in Newcastle, was opened on Pilgrim Street. In 1860, the Dominicans returned to Newcastle, working out of St Andrew's Church. In 1863 they bought the site of St Dominic's Church. The site was originally on the line of the eastern extension of Hadrian's Wall between Pons Aelius (Newcastle) and Segedunum (Wallsend).

=== Construction ===
In 1869, the foundation stone of the church was laid. On 11 September 1873, Cardinal Manning opened the church. The construction of the church cost £15,000, and it was designed by Archibald Matthias Dunn. According to Historic England, it was built in the Romanesque-Gothic transitional style. The altar of the church came from St Andrew's Church on Pilgrim Street. St Andrew's Church was demolished and rebuilt on Worswick Street in 1875.

In 1887, the priory next to the church was built, St Dominic's Priory. It was designed by Archibald Matthias Dunn with Edward Joseph Hansom. St Dominic's Priory is also a Grade II listed building and was registered on 30 March 1987.

=== Developments ===
Additions were made to the church. In 1883, the Father Willis Organ was installed. In 1895, some stalls from Peterborough Cathedral were given to St Dominic's Church. The stalls were made in 1827, designed by Edward Blore and carved by Francis Ruddle. In 1956, the upper chapel of St Dominic (the Hogg Chapel) was added to the church.

In 2004, the St Dominic's Priory was given to the Roman Catholic Diocese of Hexham and Newcastle. In 2016, the Dominicans announced that they would leave Newcastle. They left in 2020, and in September 2021 a community of Jesuits arrived to begin a city-centre apostolate from St Dominic's. In 2026, the Jesuits left and the diocese again administers the church.

== Parish ==
The church is part of a partnership of city-centre churches with St Mary's Cathedral and St Andrew's Church on Worswick Street. St Dominic's Church has Sunday Mass on 5:30pm on Saturday and 10:00am and 7:00pm on Sunday.
