= St Mary's Star of the Sea Church, Leith =

Church in Edinburgh, Scotland

St Mary’s Star of the Sea Church
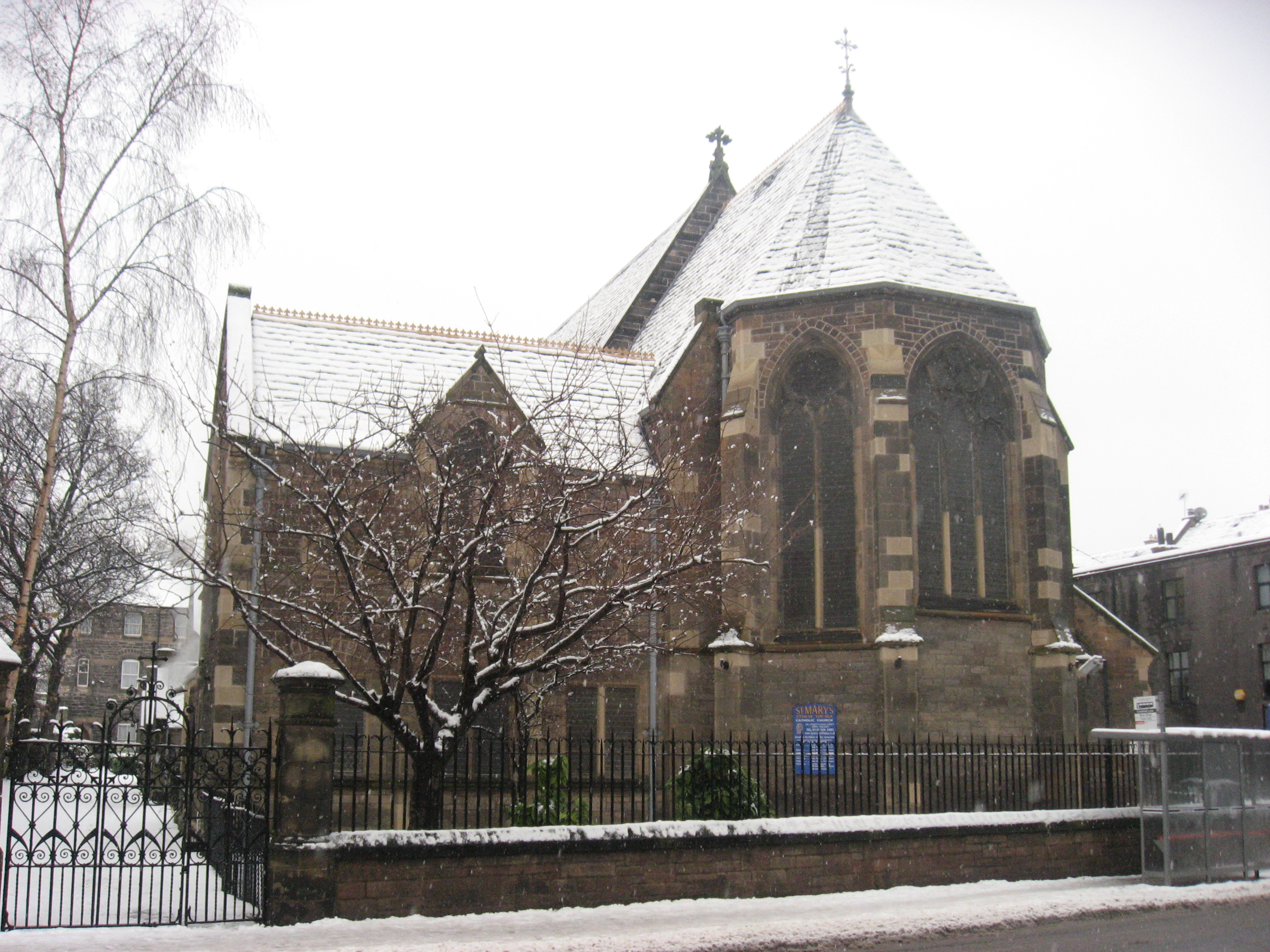
- St Mary’s Star of the Sea Church
- 55.9732°N 3.1690°W
- Location: Leith, Edinburgh
- Country: Scotland
- Denomination: Roman Catholic
- Website: St. Mary's Star of the Sea

History
- Status: Parish church
- Founded: 1847
- Dedication: St Mary Star of the Sea

Architecture
- Functional status: Active
- Heritage designation: Category B listed
- Architect(s): Pugin & Hansom
- Style: Italianate
- Completed: 1852

Administration
- Province: St Andrews and Edinburgh
- Archdiocese: St Andrews and Edinburgh
- Deanery: St Giles', City of Edinburgh

Clergy
- Archbishop: Leo Cushley
- Priest(s): Fr Martin Moran, OMI

St Mary Star of the Sea (Leith) Church is a Roman Catholic parish church in Edinburgh, Scotland. It is situated on Constitution Street in the Leith district and staffed by the Missionary Oblates of Mary Immaculate.

The church was designed in 1854 by the architects E.W. Pugin and Joseph Hansom in the Gothic style. It is a Category B listed building. The Church has over 20 stained glass windows, and one of the side altars is dedicated to Mary Star of the Sea, the patron saint of Leith since the 12th Century.

== Archaeology and history ==
Archaeological work carried out in advance of the construction of a new church hall in 2004 found the remains of the front of Balmerino House. That house was built in 1631 by John Stewart, Earl of Carrick, and sold to Lord Balmerino in 1643. It remained in the Balmerino family until 1746 when the fifth Lord Balmerino died and then the Sixth Lord was executed for his part in the failed Jacobite rebellion. The house then changed hands several time until the Church purchased it in 1848. St Mary's Star of the Sea was built in 1853 and Balmerino House was finally demolished in the 1970s. There is some conflict over the date it was built - the church website says it was designed in 1854 but the historical records in Canmore state that it was opened in 1854.

The archaeologists also found a small burial ground which predated the house. The human remains consisted of six adult males and date to between the early 16th and mid 17th centuries but before the house was built. It is thought that they may be part of the edge of the burial grounds from the South Leith parish church.

The earliest feature uncovered on the site was a well containing 13th to 14th-century pottery. Of importance to the history of clay tobacco pipe manufacture in Scotland was a small assemblage of clay-pipe wasters and kiln waste that were found and dated to around 1630–40.

Later excavations in 2006 found more remains of the Balmerio House.

When the church was built it had no chancel, no north aisle and was orientated to the west. The north aisle was added in 1900 and the chancel in 1912, at that time the present west entrance was made.

== Parish organisation ==
From 2017 the many parishes in Edinburgh have been organised into clusters to better coordinate their resources. St. Mary's is one of four parishes in Cluster 5 along with Holy Cross, St. Margaret Mary's and St. Margaret (DM).

The parish is part of the Oblate Centre of Mission Edinburgh which also includes St John Olgilvie's Church in Wester Hailes and the priests of both parishes.

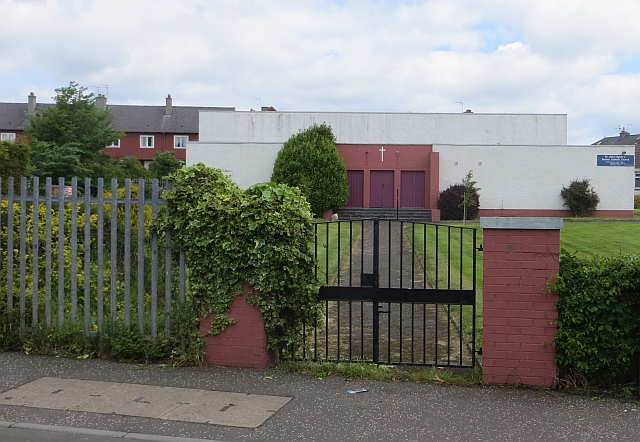
St John Ogilvie Church, Wester Hailes

== Images ==
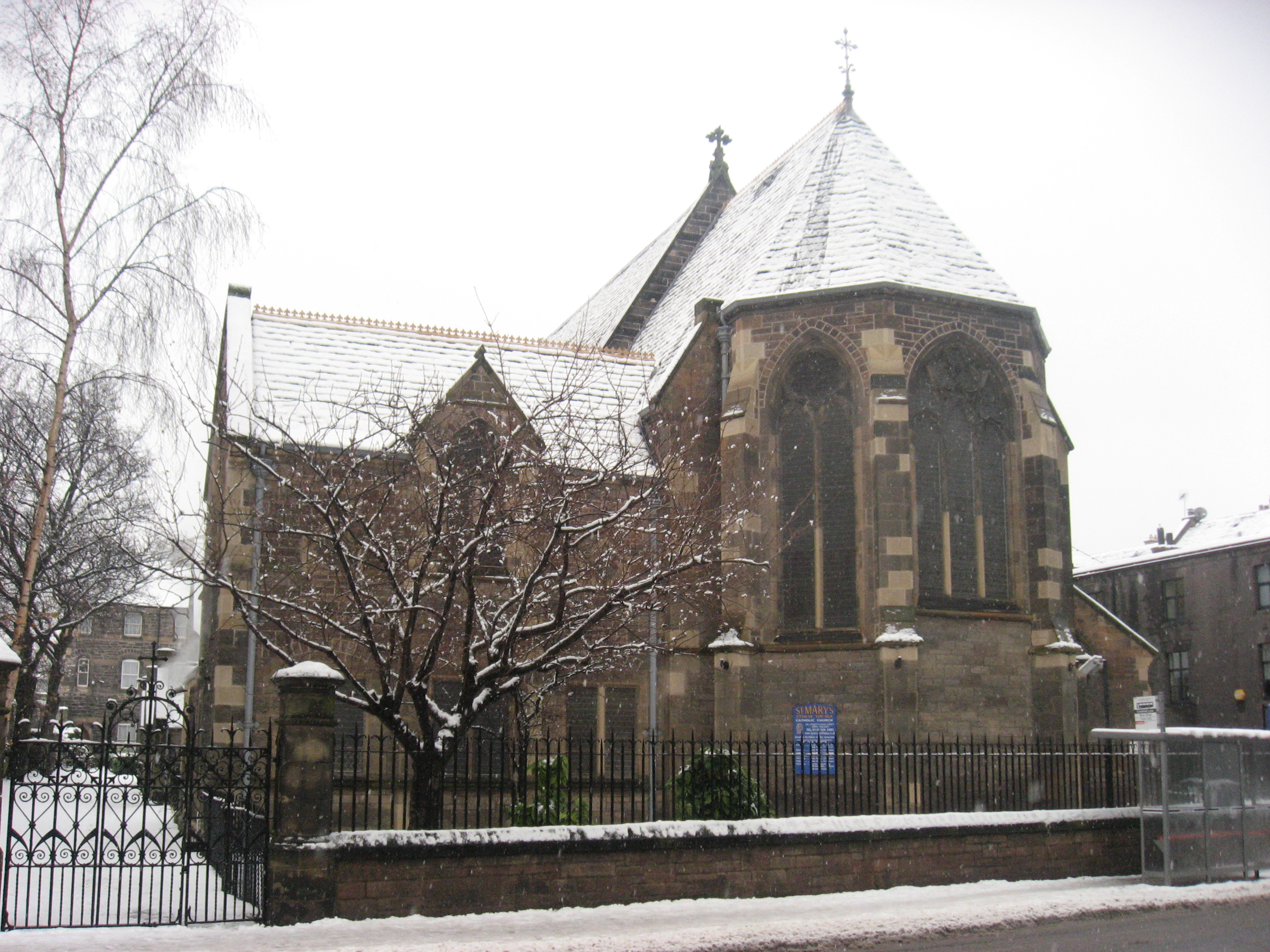

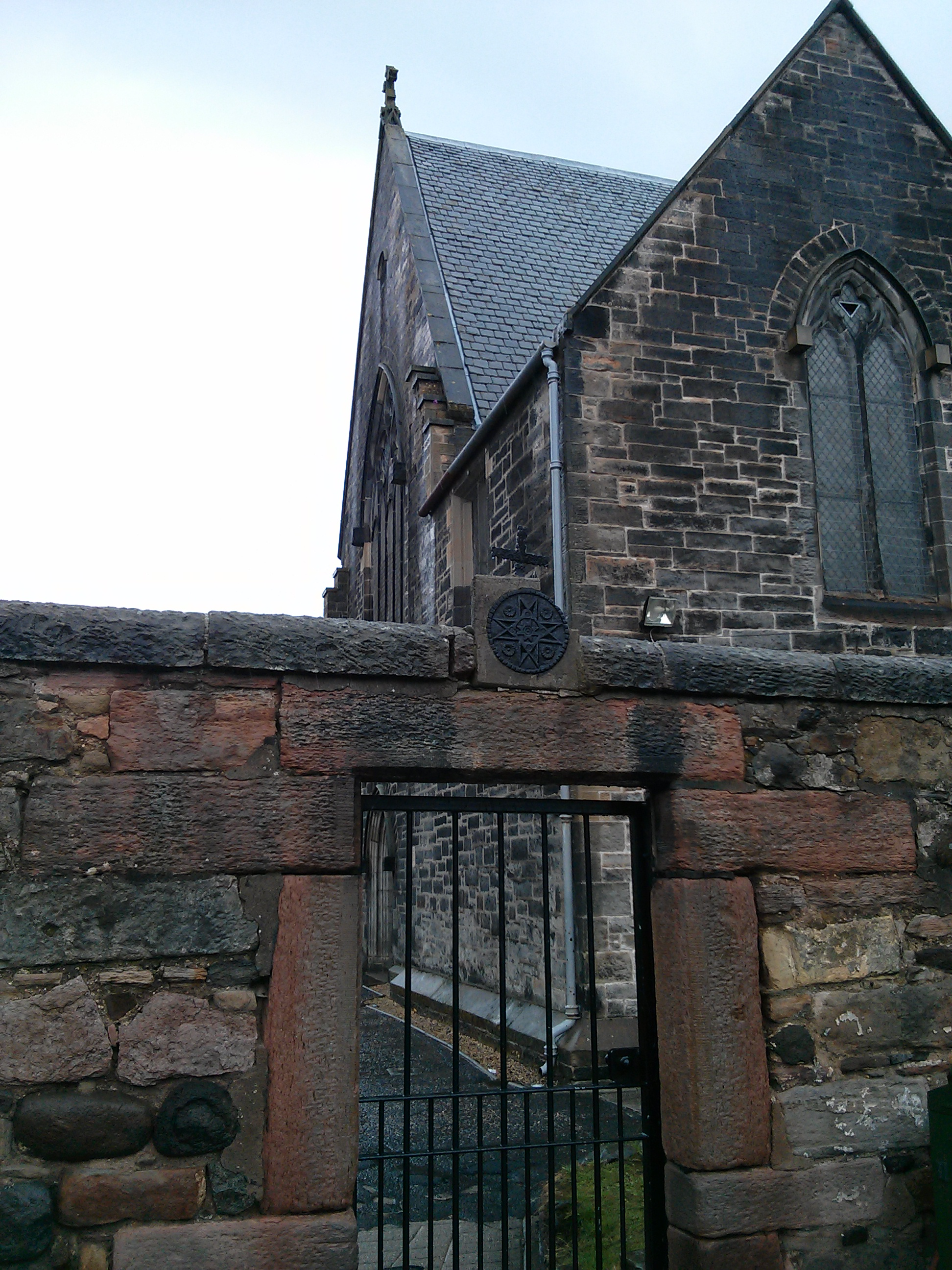

== See also ==
- Roman Catholic Archdiocese of St Andrews and Edinburgh
