= St Joseph's Church, Hartlepool =

Church in County Durham, England

St Joseph's Church
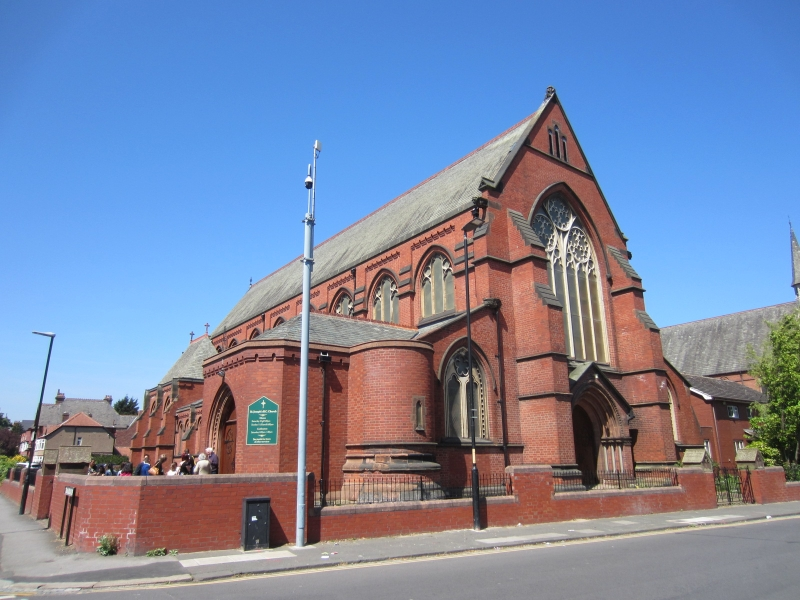
- St Joseph's Church
- 54.6851°N 1.2206°W
- OS grid reference: NZ 50345 32502
- Location: Hartlepool
- Country: England
- Denomination: Roman Catholic
- Website: Official website

History
- Status: Parish church
- Founded: 1867
- Dedication: Saint Joseph

Architecture
- Functional status: Active
- Heritage designation: Grade II listed
- Designated: 17 December 1985
- Architect(s): Dunn, Hansom and Fenwicke
- Style: Gothic Revival
- Groundbreaking: 9 August 1893
- Completed: 5 February 1895
- Construction cost: £13,000

Administration
- Province: Liverpool
- Diocese: Hexham and Newcastle
- Parish: The Parish Of The Holy Family, Hartlepool

St Joseph's Church is a Roman Catholic Parish church in Hartlepool, County Durham, England. It was built from 1893 to 1895 and designed by Edward Joseph Hansom, Archibald Matthias Dunn and W. Ellison Fenwicke in the Gothic Revival style. It is located on the corner of Hutton Avenue and St Paul's Road close to the centre of Hartlepool. It is a Grade II listed building. It is also close to an Anglican Church called St Paul's Church.

== History ==
=== Foundation ===
During the Reformation, the local Catholics worshipped in the Hardwick Hall. In 1834 the first Catholic church was built in Hartlepool, it was St Mary's Chapel in Headland. With the local Catholic population growing, in 1851 the chapel was replaced by St Mary's Church, then known as St Hilda's (not to be confused with the Church Of England St Hilda's).

In 1867, a mission was started from St Mary's Church in the town centre. It was named the St Joseph's Mission. The mission was in various buildings around the town centre and fundraising was done for a new church.

=== Construction ===
On 9 August 1893, the foundation stone of St Joseph's church was laid. Less than two years later, on 5 February 1895, the church was opened. It cost £13,000 with a capacity of 1000 people. The church was designed by the architectural firm Dunn, Hansom and Fenwicke, consisting of Edward Joseph Hansom, Archibald Matthias Dunn and W. Ellison Fenwick.

Later additions were made to the church. In 1966, a porch was added to the northwest of the church. In 1976, a presbytery was added and three years later, in 1979 a parish centre. The sanctuary was refurbished in 1979/1980. All these additions were instigated by the then parish priest, Canon Patrick Lacey who died from a heart attack 2 weeks after his Golden Jubilee Mass. He was also known as "the building priest" having made plans to build 2 other churches, St Thomas More's and St John Vianney's.

In 1995, a century after the opening of the church, a book was published that described the history of the church, it was called St Joseph's Church, Hartlepool, 1895 to 1995: A Century of Community.

== Parish ==
With St Mary's Church in Headland, St Patrick's Church, and St John Vianney's Church, the church is part of the Holy Family Parish. St Joseph's Church has two Sunday Masses at 4:00pm on Saturday and 10:30am on Sunday. St Patrick's has one Sunday Mass at 9:00am, and St John Vianney's has one Sunday Mass on Saturdays at 6.00pm.

== Interior ==
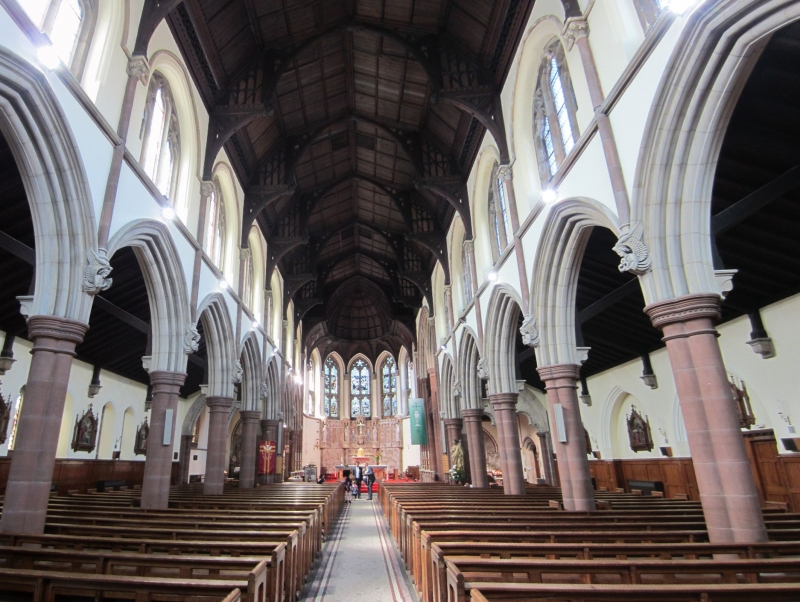
The Sanctuary

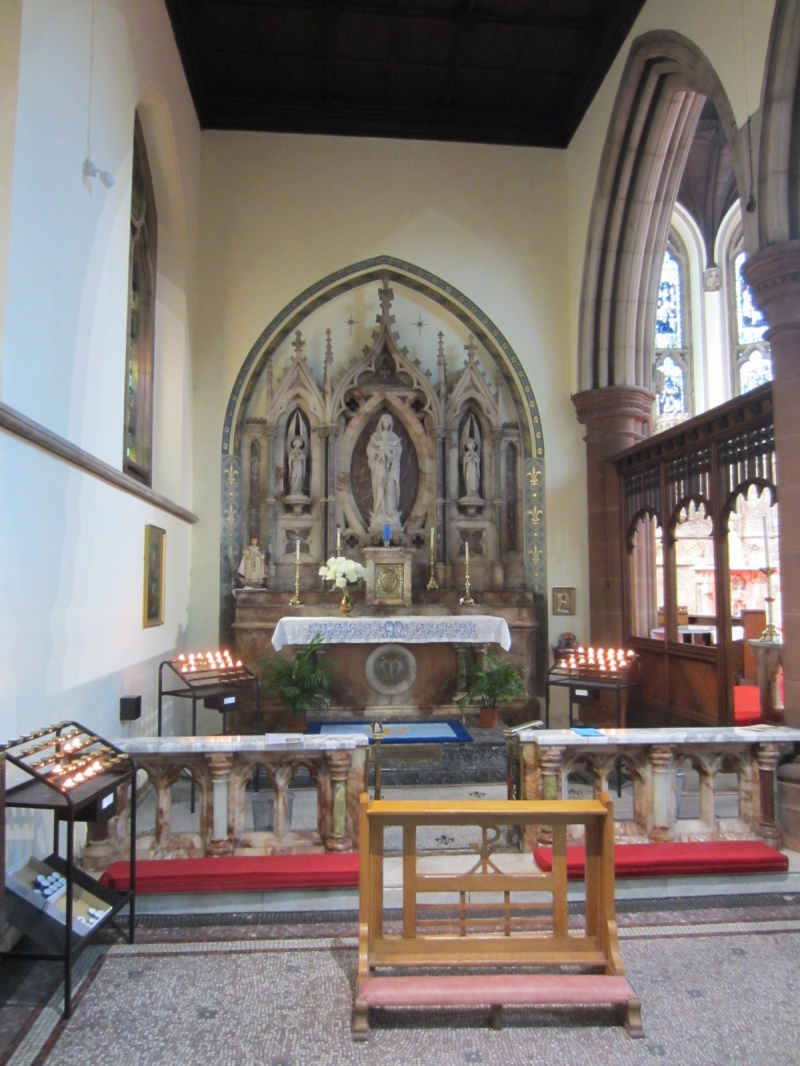
The Lady Altar (side altar)

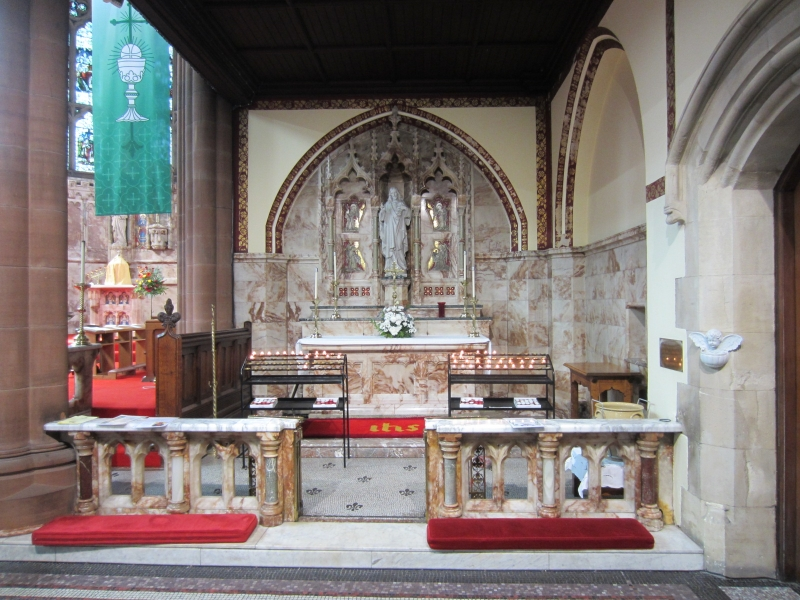
The Sacred Heart Altar (side Altar)

== See also ==
- Media related to St Joseph's Church, Hartlepool at Wikimedia Commons
- Diocese of Hexham and Newcastle

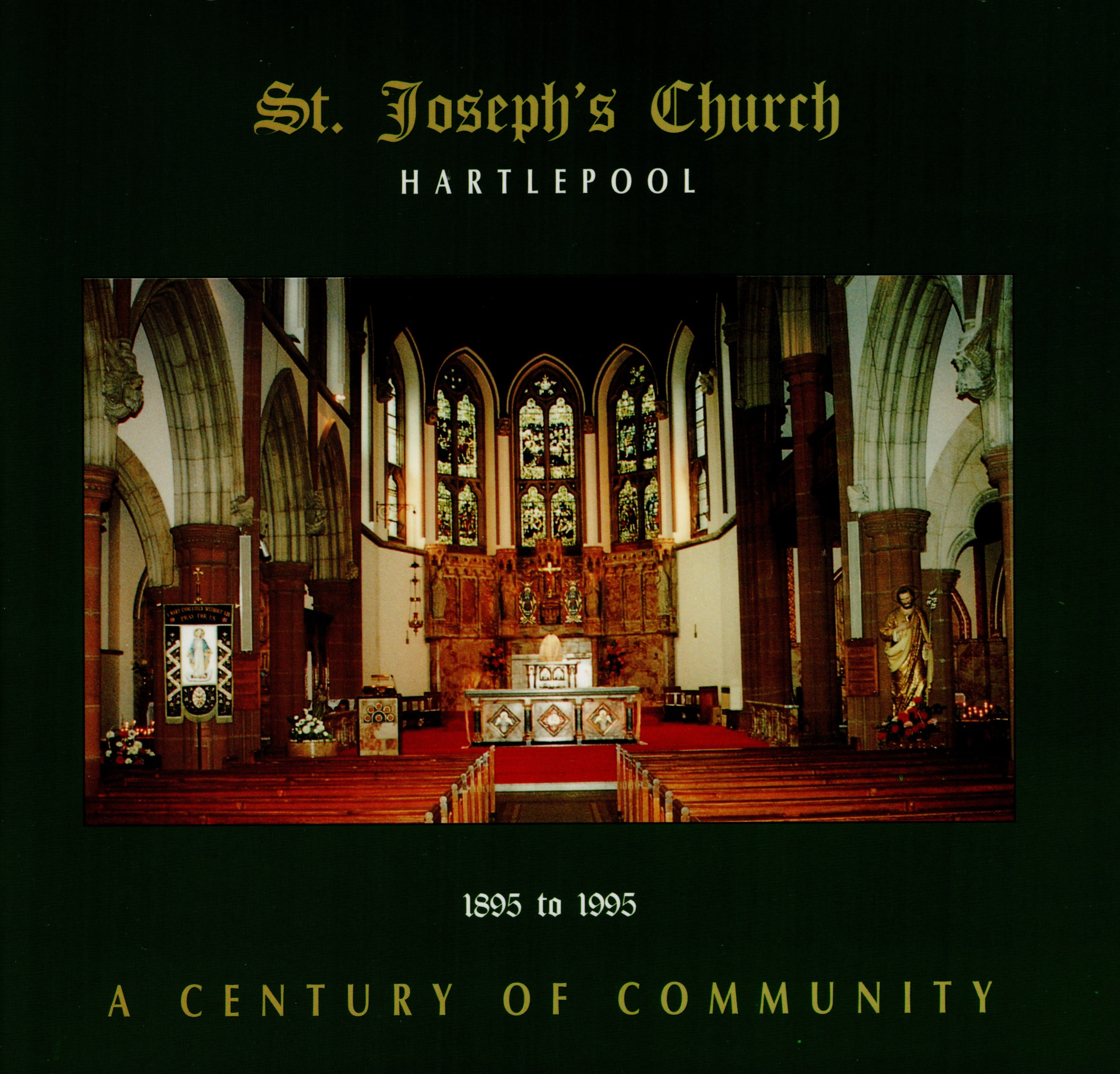
St Joseph's Book, published by the Print Factory, Hartlepool
