= Francis Ruddle =

British builder and carpenter (1798–1882)

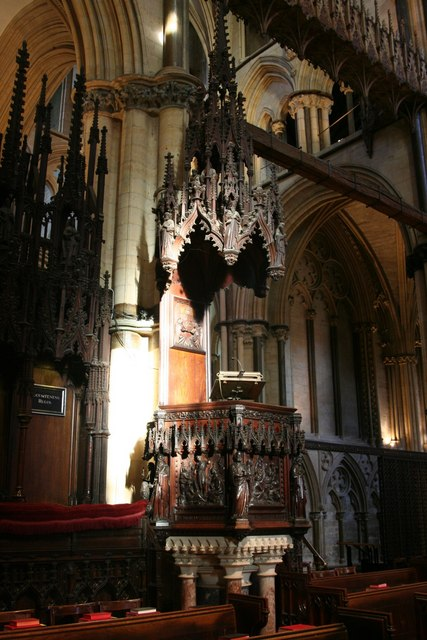
Pulpit in Lincoln Cathedral Choir

Francis Ruddle (23 November 1798 – 9 February 1882) was a 19th-century master builder and carpenter, born and based in Peterborough. His carpentry work includes the choir stalls in place at Westminster Abbey in London.

Ruddle carried out much of his work in association with a local Peterborough builder, John Thompson (born 1787/8), with whom he had a long-term business relationship, eventually forming the company Ruddle & Thompson. After the death of Thompson, Ruddle worked alongside his late partner's son, John Thompson junior (1824–98).

Working to designs by the celebrated architect and designer, Edward Blore, in 1830–31, Ruddle fabricated new choir stalls and an organ screen for Peterborough Cathedral. The carpentry work was removed from the cathedral in 1883 at the time that the central tower of the cathedral was in danger of collapse. Some of the choir stalls were procured by a parishioner at St Dominic's Church in Newcastle upon Tyne and are still in St Dominic's.

The work at Westminster Abbey was carried out in two phases, again working under the designs of Blore, who was then engaged as surveyor to the abbey. A new organ case was built by Ruddle in 1832–33 at a contracted cost of £827. It replaced an earlier one by Schrider but met with immediate problems, with the dean, John Ireland, describing Ruddle's work as having "an entire unattention to the principles on which woodwork is applied to the propagation of sound". This issue was soon rectified, but the organ case was removed in 1847.

A contract for the fabrication of 52 new choir stalls and other associated work on the Westminster Abbey choir was signed by Ruddle in May 1845. The work was completed by Ruddle and his team in 1848 at a total cost recorded in abbey accounts of £5,909.13s.11d. The choir stalls remain in place today.

In 1858, Ruddle & Thompson were entrusted with the role of general contractors for the restoration of Hereford Cathedral under the designs of George Gilbert Scott.

In 1863, Ruddle fabricated a new pulpit for Lincoln Cathedral for £500, again working to designs by Scott. The pulpit, in St Hugh's Choir, is still in use.

Other works by Ruddle during his career includes Thorpe Hall (Peterborough), Thicket Priory, Ripon Cathedral, the Queen's private chapel at Windsor Castle, All Saints' Church, Oakham, the chapel at Balliol College, Oxford and the former British Embassy in Constantinople (Istanbul).
