= St Benet's Church, Sunderland =

St Benet's Church
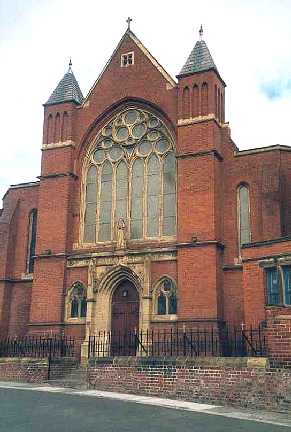
- St Benet's Church
- 54°54′53″N 1°22′44″W
- Location: Monkwearmouth, Sunderland
- Country: England
- Denomination: Catholic
- Website: WearCatholic.org

History
- Status: Active
- Founded: 1861
- Dedication: Benedict Biscop

Architecture
- Architect(s): Dunn, Hansom & Dunn
- Style: Gothic Revival
- Groundbreaking: 28 July 1888
- Completed: 14 July 1889

Administration
- Diocese: Hexham and Newcastle
- Deanery: Monkwearmouth

St Benet's Church is a Catholic church in Monkwearmouth in Sunderland. It was built in 1889 and designed by Archibald Matthias Dunn and Edward Joseph Hansom. It is located on the corner of Thomas Street North and George Street North, half a kilometre east of the Stadium of Light. From 1900 to 2011, the Redemptorists served the parish. The church is now once again served by priests from the Diocese of Hexham and Newcastle. When it was built, it was the first Catholic church in Sunderland to be built north of the River Wear in the nineteenth century.

== History ==
=== Foundation ===
In 1861, a Fr George Dunn bought the land behind Roker Avenue for a Catholic school and chapel. The chapel was the place of worship for the local Catholic community north of the River Wear. In 1873, a Fr Jules de Floer came to area, who started the efforts to build the current church. The architects, Dunn, Hansom & Dunn, consisting of Archibald Matthias Dunn, his son Archibald Manuel Dunn, and Edward Joseph Hansom, were chosen to design the church.

=== Construction ===
On 28 July 1888, the foundation stone was laid, it was blessed by Bishop Thomas Wilkinson. The builders were from T. Lumsden of Jarrow. The stone carving inside the church was done by Richard Lockwood Boulton. Under a year later, on 14 July 1889, the church was opened, again by Bishop Wilkinson.

In 1900, Bishop Wilkinson invited the Redemptorists to staff the parish. The presbytery built between the school and the church was demolished and a monastery was built in its place to house the Redemptorists. It was finished in 1902, built by George Hodgson of Sunderland and cost £4580. In 1909, a new sanctuary and side chapels were added to the church, and the high altar was moved to the new sanctuary. A new sacristy was added linking the church and the monastery.

=== Developments ===
In 1916, during World War One, the church was damaged by bombardment from Zeppelins, and all the windows were destroyed. In 1925, a parish hall was added. On 24 March 1983, a new altar was consecrated by Bishop Owen Swindlehurst. In 1993, a new parish hall, smaller than before, was built. In 2003, the interior of the church was redecorated. In 2011, the Redemptorists left the parish and priests from the Diocese of Hexham and Newcastle returned to the serve the congregation.

== St Hilda's Church ==
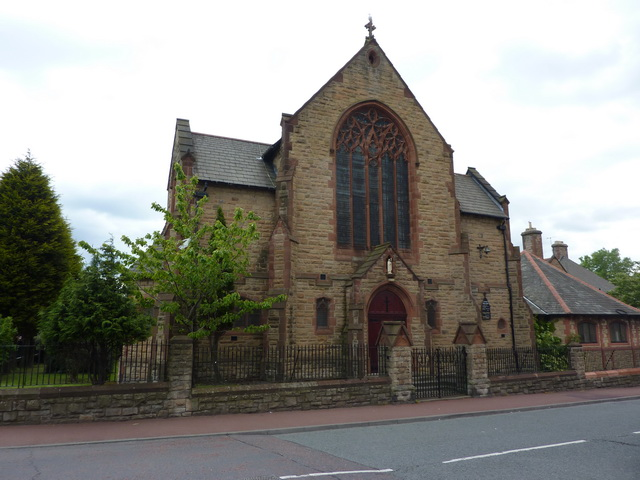
St Hilda's Church

In 1902, while at St Benet's Church, the Redemptorists built a school and chapel in nearby Southwick, Sunderland. In 1908, the school was handed to the diocese and in 1908 building work began on St Hilda's Church. On 8 June 1908, the foundation stone was laid by Bishop Richard Collins. The priest Fr Smith placed a fragment of a wall-shaft from Whitby Abbey, on the foundation stone of the church. In 1909, the church was opened. In 1912, the presbytery was built. On 9 May 1985, the Fr Smith Parish Room was opened by Bishop Swindlehurst. On 15 June 2001, the church was consecrated by Bishop Ambrose Griffiths.

== Parish ==
After the Redemptorists left St Benet's Church, one priest serves three churches in Monkwearmouth: St Benet's Church, Sacred Heart and St John Bosco Church and St Hilda's Church. So the Sunday Mass times cannot be the same amongst the three churches. St Benet's Church Sunday Mass is at 11:00am on Sunday, St Hilda's Church's Mass is at 6:00pm on Saturday and Sacred Heart and St John Bosco Church has its Masses at 4:30pm on Saturday and 9:30am on Sunday.

== See also ==
- St Mary's Church, Sunderland
