= Our Lady and St Oswin's Church, Tynemouth =

Coordinates: 55.01747°N 1.42159°W

Our Lady and St Oswin's Church
- St Oswin's Church
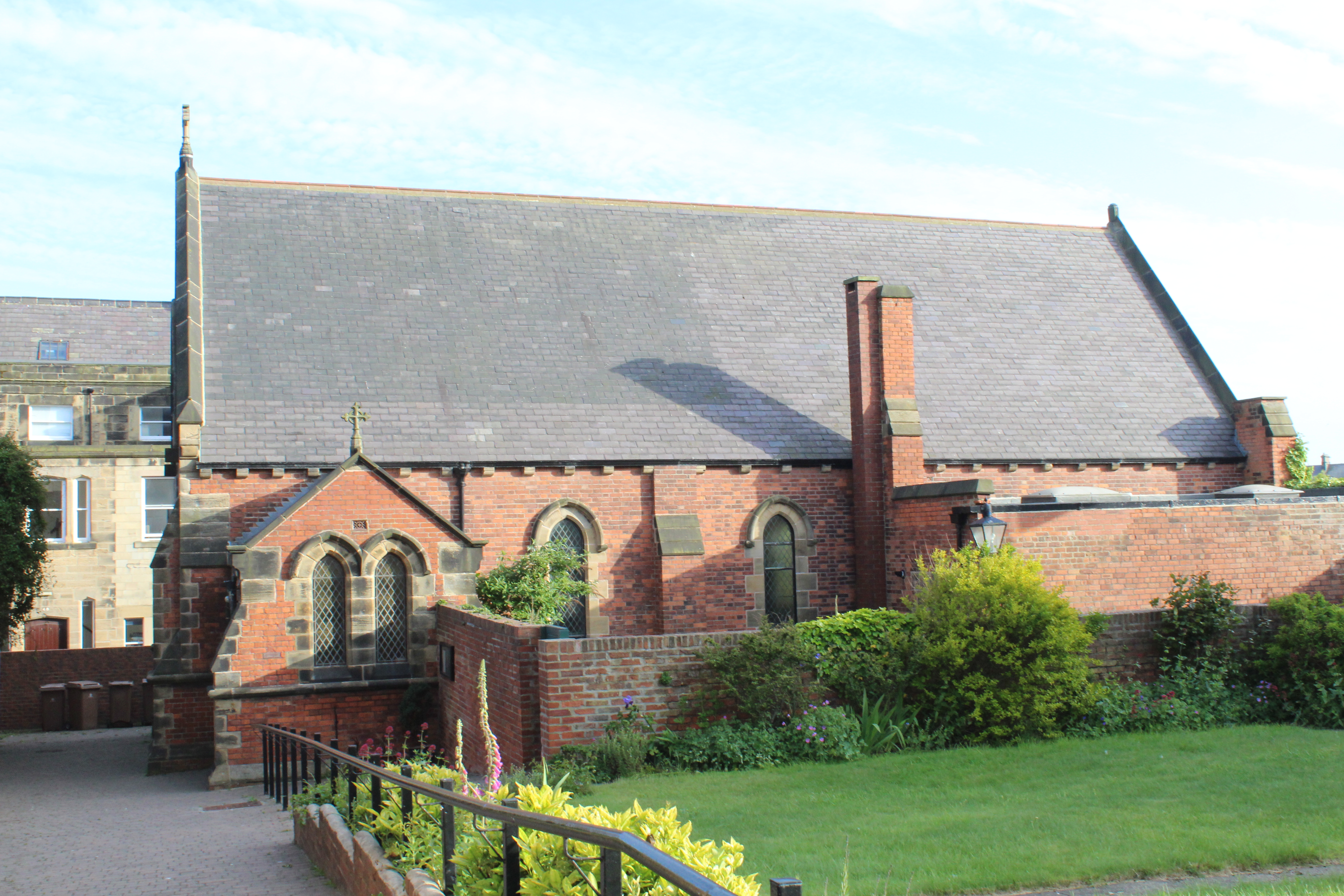
- Our Lady and St Oswin's Church
- OS grid reference: NZ 37083 69365
- Location: Tynemouth
- Country: England
- Denomination: Roman Catholic
- Website: NorthTynesideCatholic.org.uk

History
- Status: Active
- Founder: George Howe
- Dedication: Our Lady; Oswine of Deira

Architecture
- Functional status: Parish church
- Architect(s): Edward Joseph Hansom; Archibald Matthias Dunn
- Style: Gothic Revival
- Groundbreaking: 8 September 1889
- Completed: 1 June 1890
- Construction cost: £2,500

Administration
- Province: Liverpool
- Diocese: Hexham and Newcastle
- Deanery: Tynemouth Priory
- Parish: Cullercoats & Tynemouth

Our Lady and St Oswin's Church, also known as St Oswin's Church, is a Catholic parish church in Tynemouth, North Tyneside, Tyne and Wear, England. It was built in 1890 and designed by Edward Joseph Hansom and Archibald Matthias Dunn. They designed the church in the Gothic Revival style. It is located on Front Street and backs onto Pier Road, across the road from Tynemouth Priory and Castle and is named after it, being dedicated to the same saints, Mary, Mother of Jesus and Oswine of Deira.

== History ==
=== Origin ===
In the early 700s at the latest, Tynemouth Priory had been founded. It was reputedly the burial place of the King of Deira and Christian martyr, Oswine of Deira. The priory began to flourish, but suffered in the 9th century from Viking raids, eventually being abandoned. In 1083, the priory was refounded by a monk from Monkwearmouth–Jarrow Abbey and the bones of Oswin were rediscovered in the town. In 1090, building works took place, the bones were moved to the newly-built church and it became a site of pilgrimage. In 1539, it was dissolved as part of the Dissolution of the Monasteries, the relics were destroyed, and the site was used as a castle.

=== Foundation ===
In 1869, a mission was started in Tynemouth. On 15 August 1871, the Feast of the Assumption, a temporary church was opened by Bishop James Chadwick of Hexham and Newcastle on Front Street. The church was named the same as the priory down the road from it.

=== Construction ===
At the time of the construction of the church, the priest was Canon George Howe. He worked on getting the church built. On 8 September 1889, the foundation stone was laid. The church was designed by Edward Joseph Hansom and Archibald Matthias Dunn and cost £2,500 to build. The organ was made to Howe's specifications. On 1 June 1890, the church was opened by Bishop Thomas Wilkinson. In 1941, an explosion damaged the church and the presbytery. It was accidentally caused by a sea mine in the castle ditch. In the church, the doors and windows were damaged as well as the roof slates and timbers. The presbytery was damaged so severely that it was demolished, creating the current space open between the church and Front Street.

== Parish ==
The church is in the same parish as St Mary's Church in Cullercoats. There is one school in the parish, St Mary's Primary School. The two churches both have one Sunday Mass each. Our Lady and St Oswin's Church has its Sunday Mass at 9:30 am and St Mary's Church has its Sunday Mass at 11:00 am.

== See also ==
- Diocese of Hexham and Newcastle
