= Archibald Matthias Dunn =

British architect (1832 – 1917)

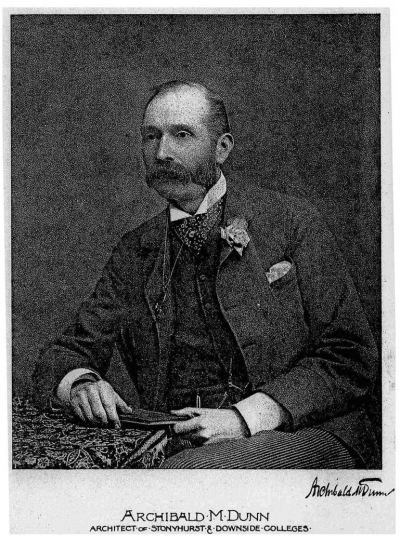
- Born: 1832; Wylam in Northumberland
- Died: 17 January 1917 (aged 84–85); Branksome Park, in Bournemouth
- Education: Ushaw College and Stonyhurst College
- Occupation: Architect
- Awards: President of the Northern Architectural Association
- Practice: Dunn and Hansom
- Buildings: Downside Abbey transepts

Archibald Matthias Dunn FRIBA, JP, (1832 – 17 January 1917) was a British architect. He was, along with his partner Edward Joseph Hansom, among the foremost Catholic architects in North East England during the Victorian era.

== Biography ==
Dunn was born in Wylam, Northumberland. His father was Matthias Dunn, a mining engineer and manager and one of the first Government Inspectors of Mines for the North East of England. Archibald Dunn was educated at Ushaw College and Stonyhurst College. He then went to Bristol to be apprenticed to architect Charles Francis Hansom, the younger brother of Joseph Aloysius Hansom, the inventor of the Hansom cab and founder of The Builder. It was here that Dunn met his future partner Edward Joseph Hansom, the son of his employer.

Their principal works in North East England include the tower and spire of St Mary's Cathedral in Newcastle upon Tyne, and the church of St. Michael in Elswick, Tyne and Wear. Dunn was also a prominent local landowner. Across the valley from Prudhoe is Castle Hill House (1878–9), which he designed and built as his own home in Wylam. Previously he had lived in Gateshead, where he was an Alderman, Mayor and a justice of the peace for County Durham. In 1870 Dunn was President of the Northern Architectural Association.

In 1862 Dunn married Sara Armstrong, an author. They both enjoyed travel, and in 1886 Dunn published a book entitled Notes and Sketches of an Architect, which was a collection of sketches made in France, Germany, Spain and England. Dunn's son, Archibald Manuel Dunn, was taken into partnership of the firm in 1887, and it became Dunn, Hansom & Dunn.

In 1894, W. Ellison Fenwicke also became a partner in the firm. In 1903, the younger Dunn withdrew. Fenwicke continued to run the firm with various partners and under various styles, the final practice being Dunn Hansom & Fenwicke although Fenwicke by then was the only active partner.

Dunn retired between 1883 and 1887. In 1901 the Dunns moved to Wood House, Branksome Park, in Bournemouth, where he died on 17 January 1917 aged 85.

== Buildings designed by Dunn ==
1854 Saint Mary's RC Church, Blackhill

1858 National School, Blyth

1858 St. Andrew's Cemetery, Hexham

1858 St. Joseph's RC Church, Gateshead

1860 St Anthony of Padua RC Church, Walker, Newcastle

1858 Our Lady and St Wilfrid RC Church, Blyth

1869 St George's RC Church, Bells Close, Lemington

1873 Saint Dominic's RC Church, Newcastle

1857 St. Nicholas' Cemetery, Fenham, Newcastle.

1868 Prudhoe Hall, Prudhoe

1868 Mining Institute/Wood Memorial Hall, Newcastle

1869–1873 St Dominic's Church, Newcastle

1878 Castle Hill House, Wylam.

=== Dunn & Hansom ===
1860 Spire of Saint Mary's Cathedral, Newcastle

1873–1882 Transepts and base of tower, Downside Abbey, Somerset

1876 Saint Matthew's School (mainly Hansom), South Road, Prudhoe

1882 Alterations to Pugin's Chapel, Ushaw

1888 Lady Chapel, Downside Abbey

1890 Our Lady and St Oswin Church, Tynemouth

=== Dunn, Hansom & Dunn ===
1885 Church of Our Lady and the English Martyrs, Cambridge

1887 Medical School, Northumberland Road, Newcastle

1887-1937 Durham University College of Medicine; housed the Dental School of the University of Durham 1945–78; and from 1978, the Law School of the University of Northumbria

1888–1889 St Benet's Church, Sunderland

1891 St Michael's RC Church, Westmorland Rd, Newcastle

1891 Our Lady and St Cuthbert RC Church, Prudhoe

1893 Our Lady and St Joseph's Church, Carlisle

1893 St Joseph's Church, Hartlepool
