= Joseph Hansom =

British architect (1803–1882)

Joseph Aloysius Hansom
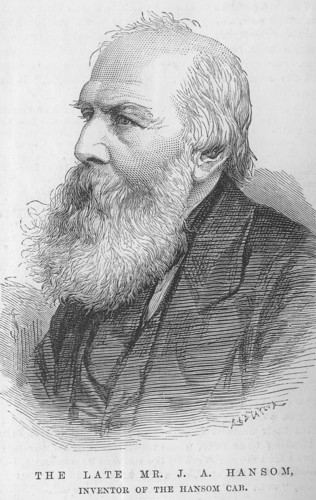
- Joseph Aloysius Hansom
- Born: 26 October 1803; York
- Died: 29 June 1882 (aged 78); Fulham
- Occupation: Architect
- Buildings: Birmingham Town Hall, 1831
- Projects: inventor of the Hansom Cab, 1834

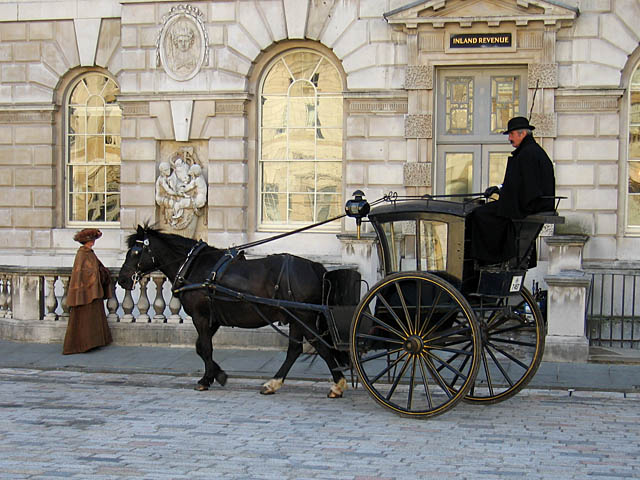
A Hansom cab

Joseph Aloysius Hansom (26 October 1803 – 29 June 1882) was an English architect working principally in the Gothic Revival style. He invented the Hansom cab and founded the eminent architectural journal The Builder in 1843.

== Career ==
Hansom was born in the parish of St Martin's (possibly on St Martin's Lane), York to a large Roman Catholic family and baptised as Josephus Aloysius Handsom(e). He was the brother of the architect Charles Francis Hansom and the uncle of Edward J. Hansom. He was apprenticed to his father, Henry, as a joiner, but showing an early aptitude for draughtsmanship and construction, he transferred his apprenticeship to a York architect named Matthew Philips, without informing the City of York. By around 1823 he had completed his apprenticeship and became a clerk in Philips' office.

About 1825 he settled in Halifax, Yorkshire, and in the same year he married Hannah Glover, the elder sister of the architect George Glover (1812–1890), at St Michael le Belfrey in York. He took a post as assistant to John Oates and there befriended the brothers John and Edward Welch, with whom he formed his first architectural partnership (Handsom & Welch) in 1828. Together they designed several churches in Yorkshire and Liverpool, and also worked on the renovation of Bodelwyddan Castle in Denbighshire and King William's College in the Isle of Man. In 1831 their designs for Birmingham Town Hall were accepted; however, the contract led to their bankruptcy, as they had stood surety for the builders. The disaster led to the dissolution of the partnership.

Hansom supported the views of social reformers Robert Owen and Thomas Attwood, and the Operative Builders Union, which was formed in 1831/3, which led to some viewing him as a socialist.

On 23 December 1834 he registered the design of a 'Patent Safety Cab' on the suggestion of his employer. Distinctive safety features included a suspended axle, while the larger wheels and lower position of the cab led to less wear and tear and fewer accidents. He went on to sell the patent to a company for £10,000; however, as a result of the purchaser's financial difficulties, the sum was never paid. The first Hansom Cab travelled down Hinckley's Coventry Road in 1835. The Hansom cab was improved by subsequent modifications and exported worldwide to become a ubiquitous feature of the 19th-century street scene.

In 1843 Hansom founded a new architectural journal known as The Builder, another venture which was to flourish through the century; renamed Building in 1966, it continues to this day. However, neither he nor his partner Alfred Bartholomew (1801–1845) profited from the enterprise, because they were compelled to retire for lack of capital.

Between 1854 and 1879 Hansom devoted himself to architecture, designing and erecting a great number of important buildings, private and public, including numerous churches, schools and convents for the Roman Catholic Church. Buildings from his designs are to be found all over the United Kingdom, as well as in Australia and South America.

Hansom practised in a succession of architectural partnerships. From 1847 to 1852 he practised in Preston, Lancashire, working briefly in association with Augustus Welby Northmore Pugin towards the end of the latter's life. After the practice moved to London, he took his brother Charles Francis Hansom into partnership in 1854. But this partnership was dissolved in 1859 when Charles established an independent practice in Bath with his son Edward Joseph Hansom as clerk.

In 1862 Joseph Hansom formed a partnership with Edward Welby Pugin, which broke up acrimoniously in 1863. Finally, in 1869, he took his son Joseph Stanislaus Hansom into partnership.

Hansom lived at 27 Sumner Place, South Kensington, London, and there is a blue plaque there in his memory.

Hansom moved to manage an estate at Caldecote Hall. He retired on 31 December 1879 and died at 399 Fulham Road, London, on 29 June 1882.

== Surviving works ==
Hansom designed around 200 buildings, including Birmingham Town Hall; Arundel Cathedral; Oxford Oratory; Cathedral of St John the Evangelist, Portsmouth; St George's Catholic Church in York; Mount St Mary's Church, the 'Famine Church' in Leeds; St Walburge's Church in Preston (with the tallest church spire in England); Church of the Immaculate Conception, Spinkhill in 1846; St Beuno's Jesuit Theologate in North Wales (1848); St Mary's Church, Hartlepool in 1850; the Church of the Assumption of Our Lady, Torquay, St Mary's Church, Madeley, and St David's Church, Dalkeith, in 1853; Annunciation Church, Chesterfield and St Mary's Star of the Sea Church, Leith, Edinburgh in 1854; St Joseph's Roman Catholic Church, Leigh in 1855; St Duthac's, Dornie, Ross and Cromartie, 1860; St Wilfrid's Church, Ripon in 1862; Our Lady the Immaculate Conception Church in Devizes, Wiltshire (opened 1865); Our Lady Help of Christians and St Denis Church, Torquay, in 1869; St Edward King and Confessor Catholic Church, Clifford; the Church of the Holy Name of Jesus, Manchester (1871); The Roman Catholic Plymouth Cathedral (built 1856 – 1858); and Our Lady of Dolours, Chelsea with St Mary's Priory, Fulham Road (1876). The Exhibition Hall Theatre, Ushaw Historic House, County Durham (1849–1851) In Leicester, the Leicester Museum & Art Gallery building, formerly New Walk Proprietary School (1836), and a Baptist chapel (1845), later used as the town's central library, are in Hansom's Classical style, and he also designed Lutterworth Town Hall (1836). In Cornwall he designed the Roman Catholic churches of Falmouth and Liskeard. St Clare's Abbey, Darlington (1856).

== Gallery of architectural work ==
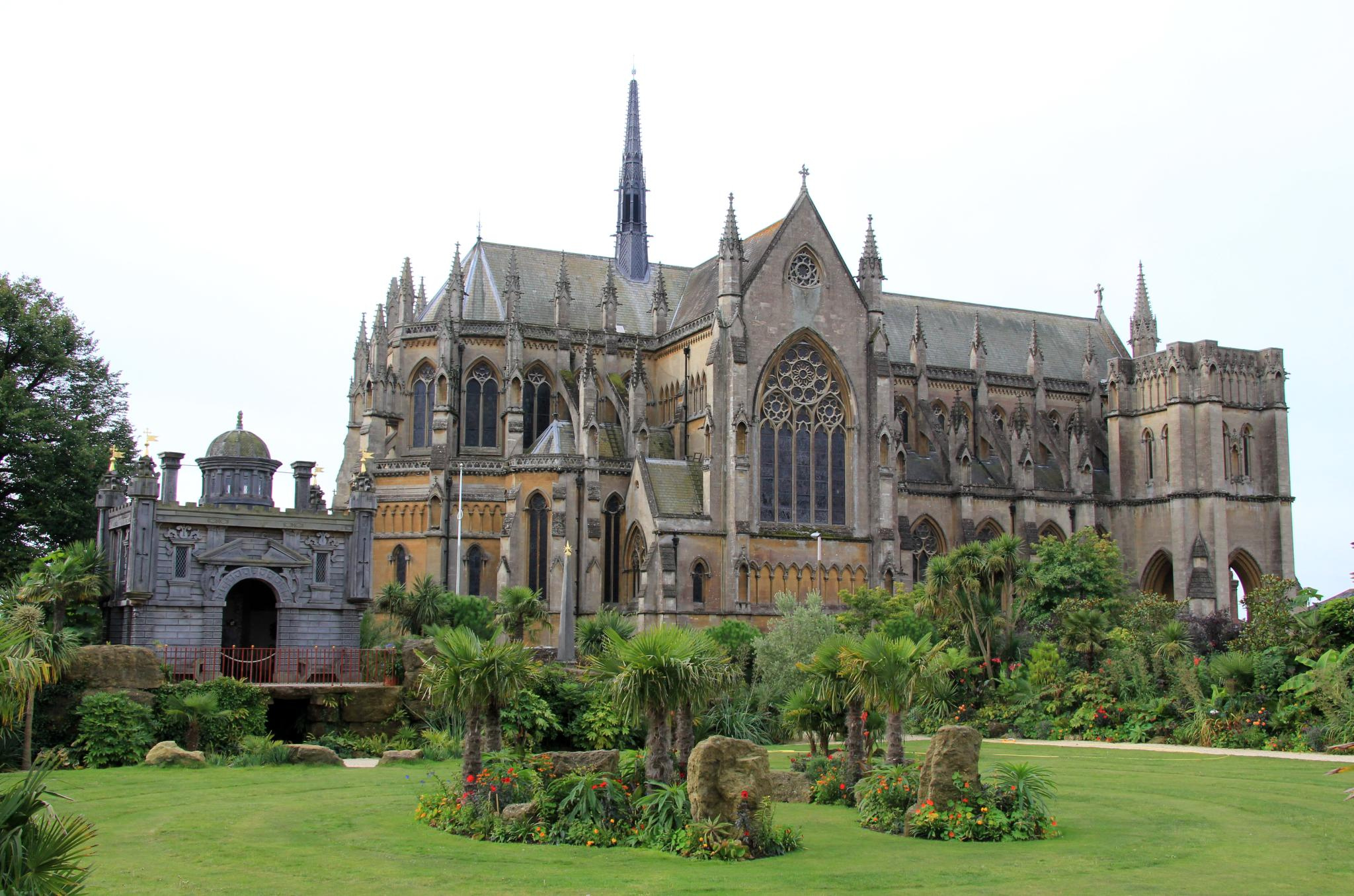
Arundel Cathedral

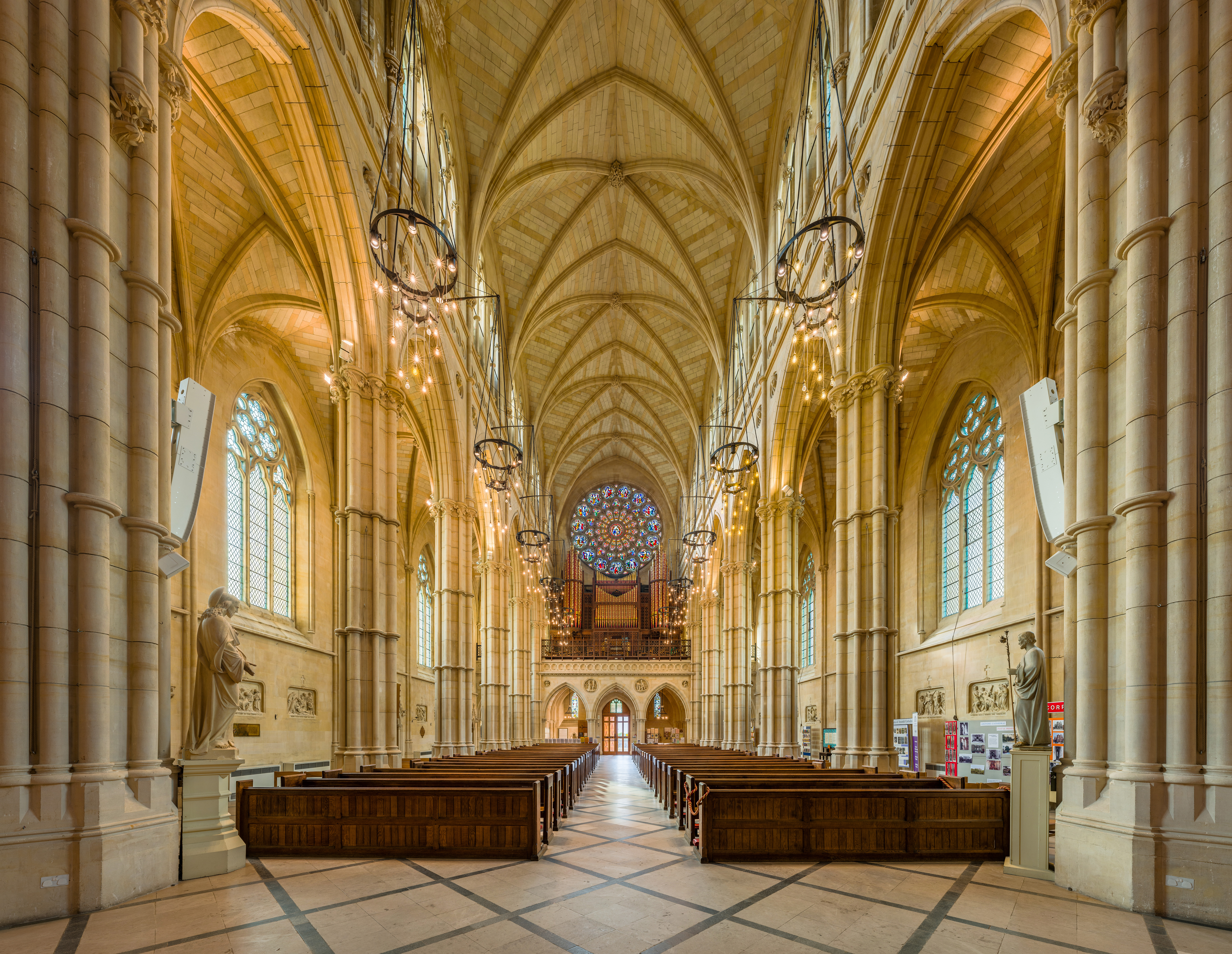
Arundel Cathedral Nave

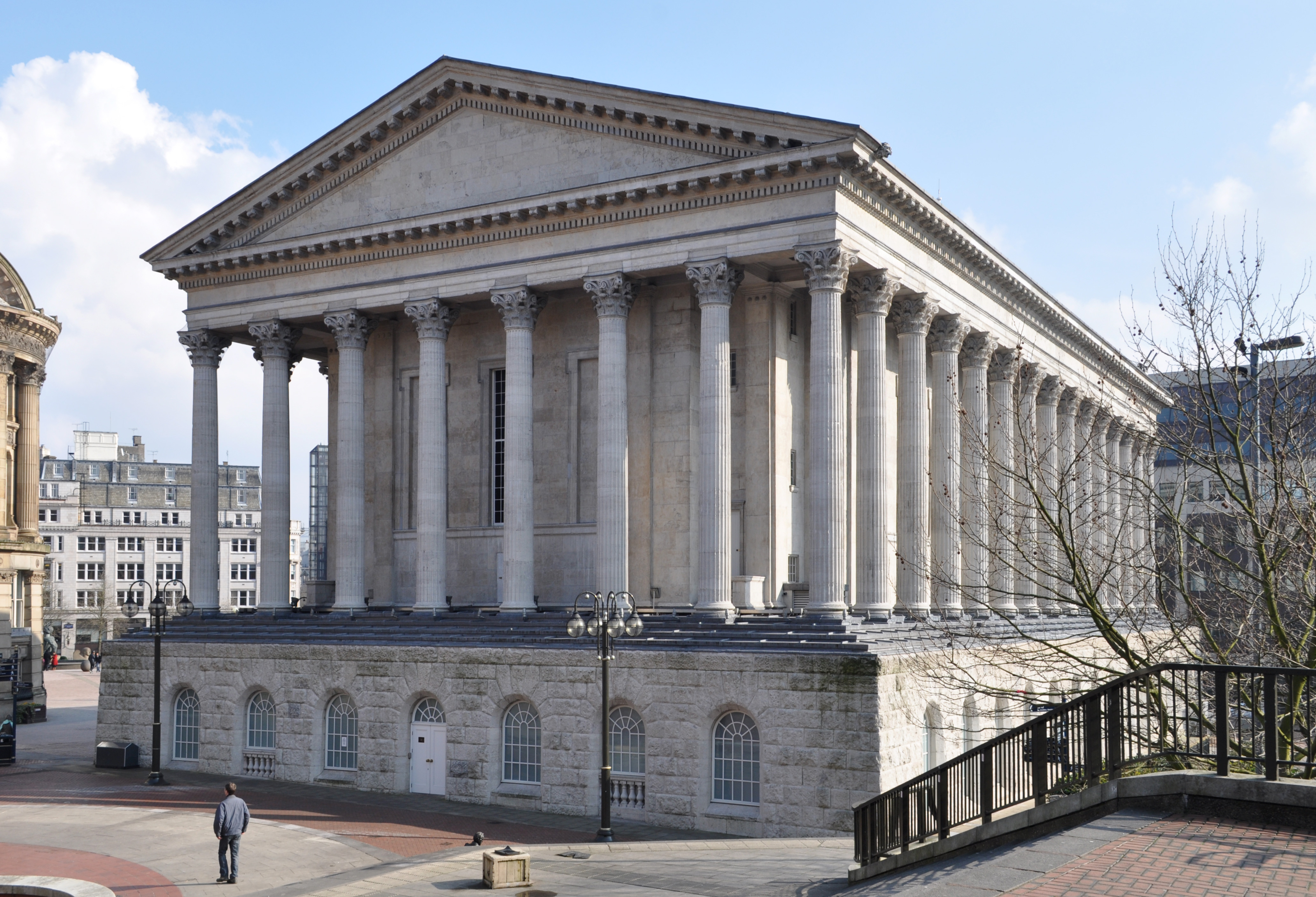
Birmingham Town Hall

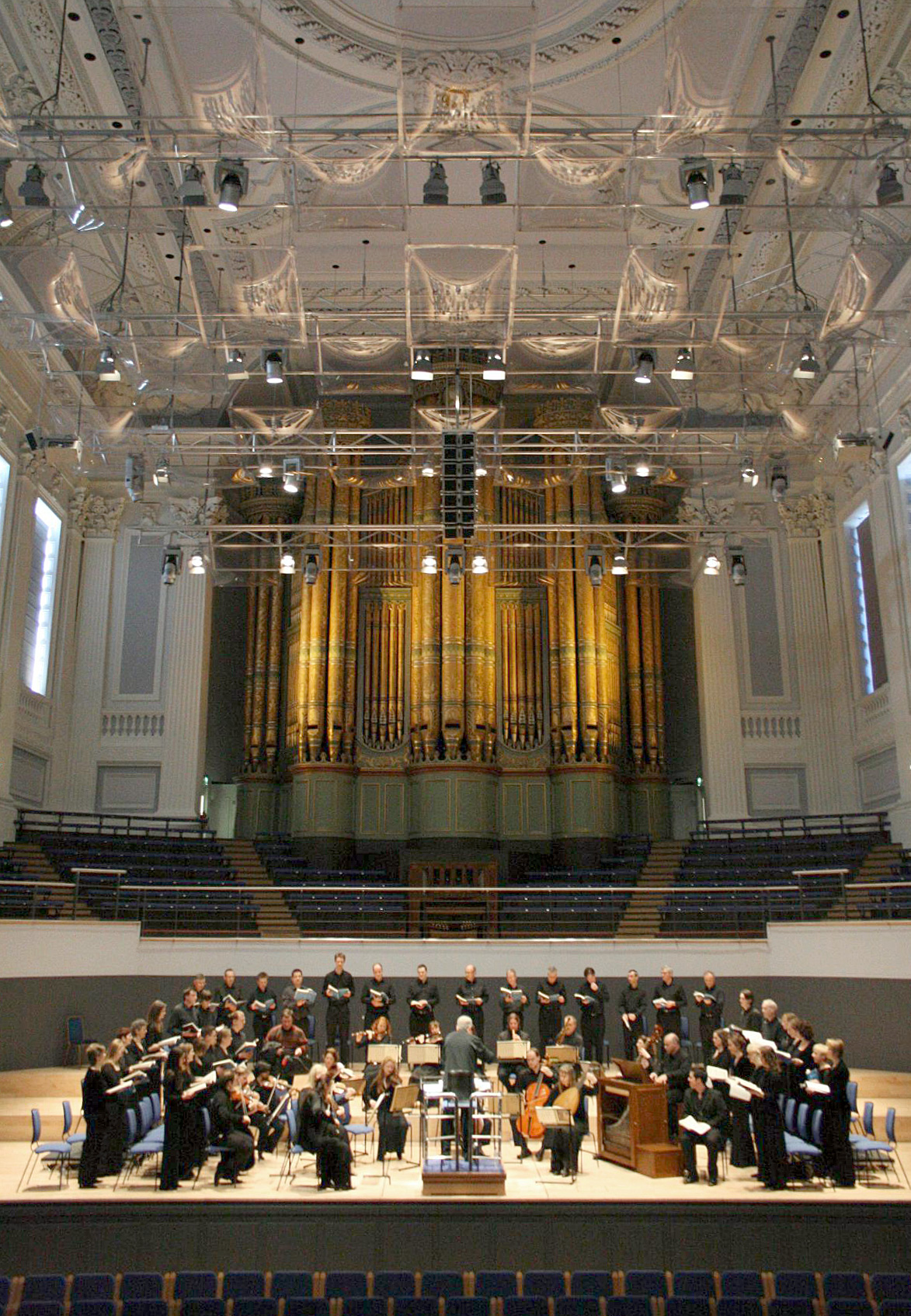
Birmingham Town Hall, interior

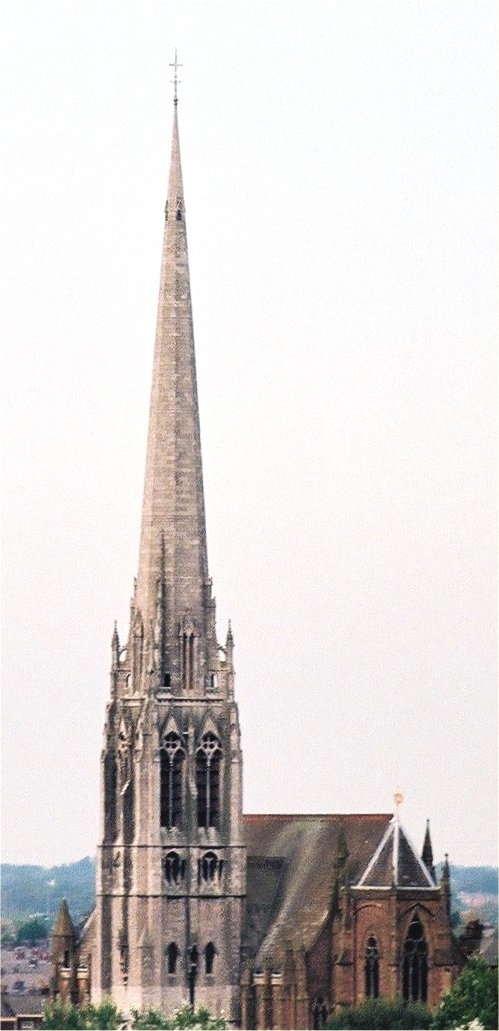
St Walburge's Church, Preston

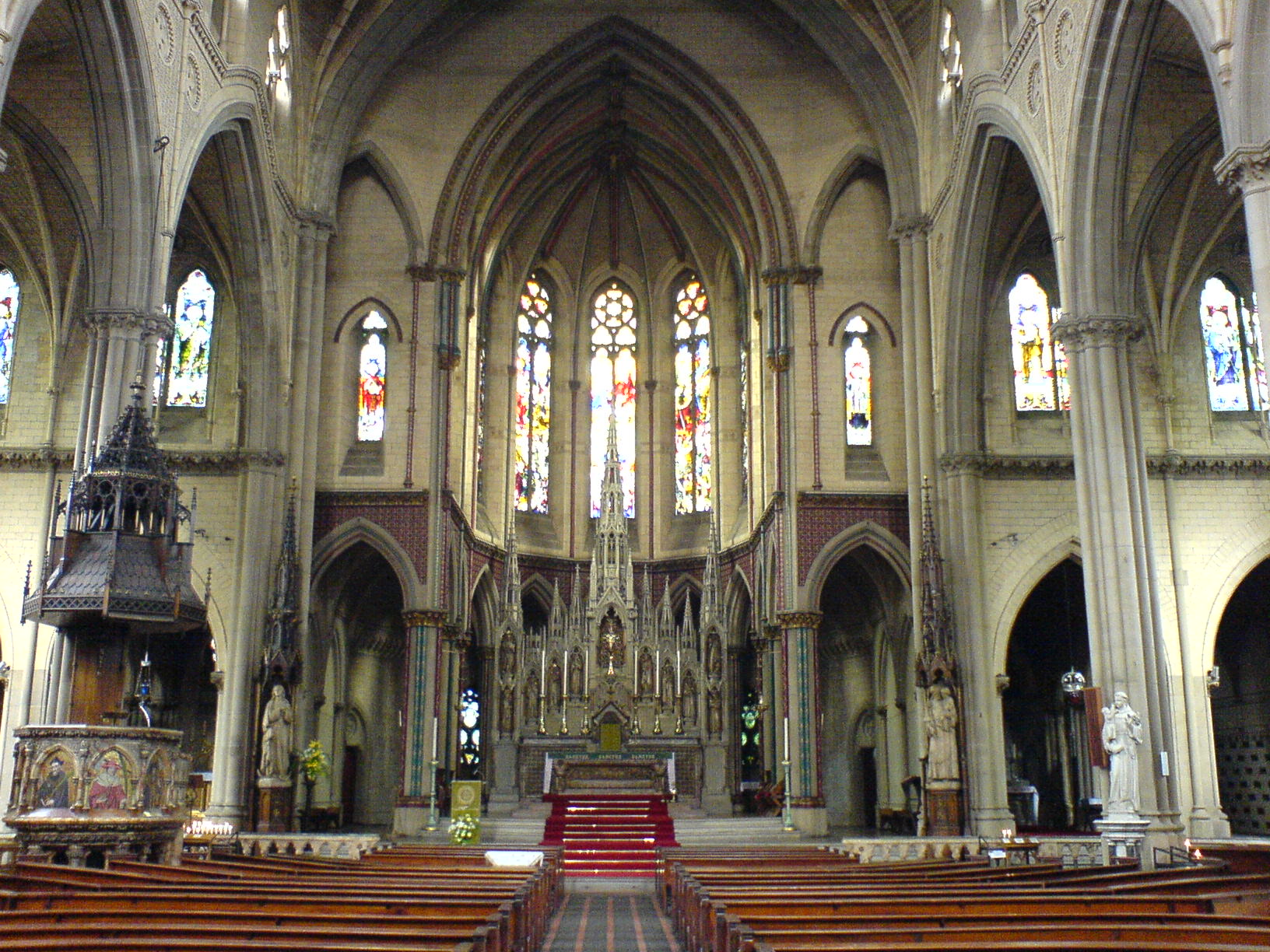
Interior, Church of the Holy Name of Jesus, Manchester

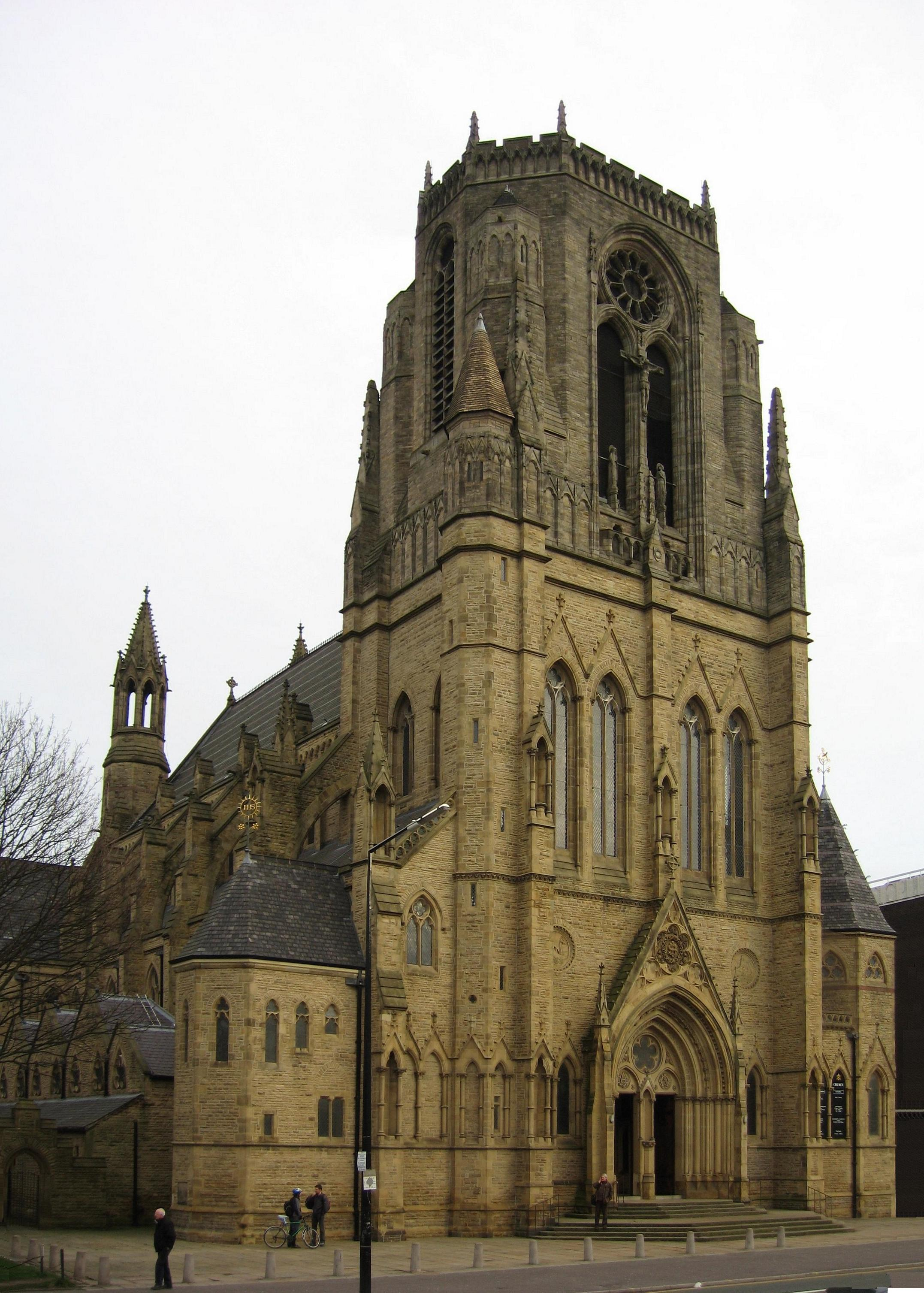
Exterior, Church of the Holy Name of Jesus, Manchester, tower added later

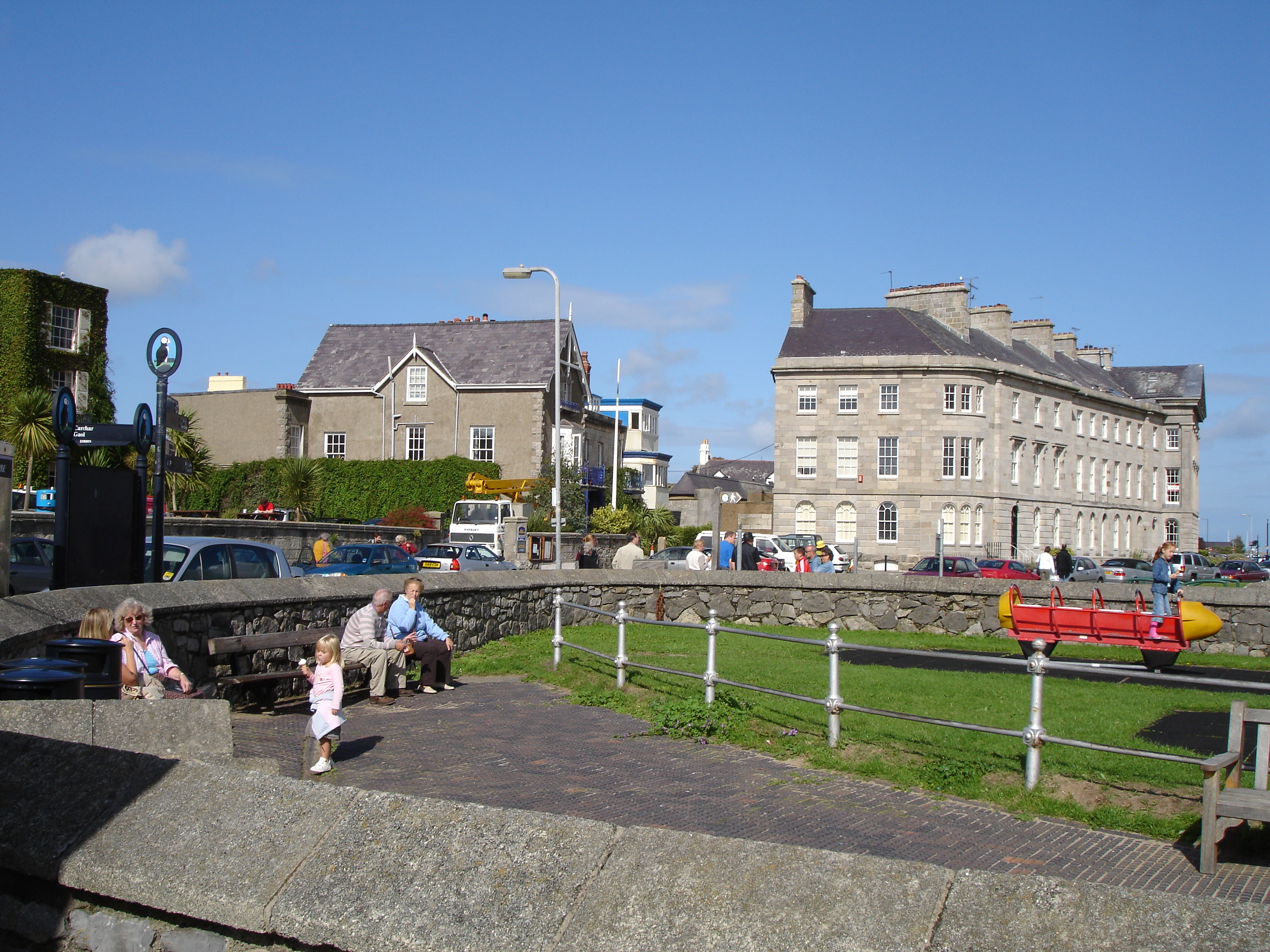
Victoria Terrace, Beaumaris, Anglesey, on right

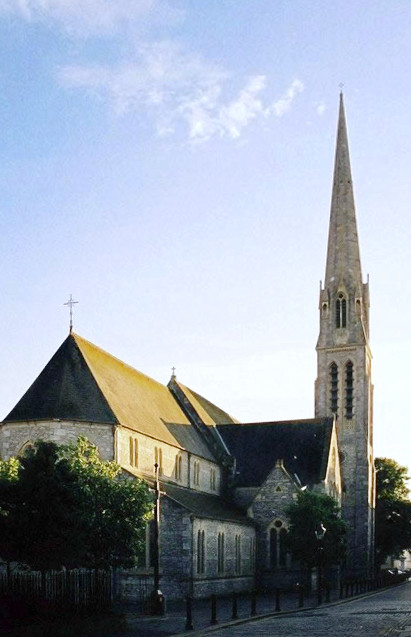
Plymouth Cathedral

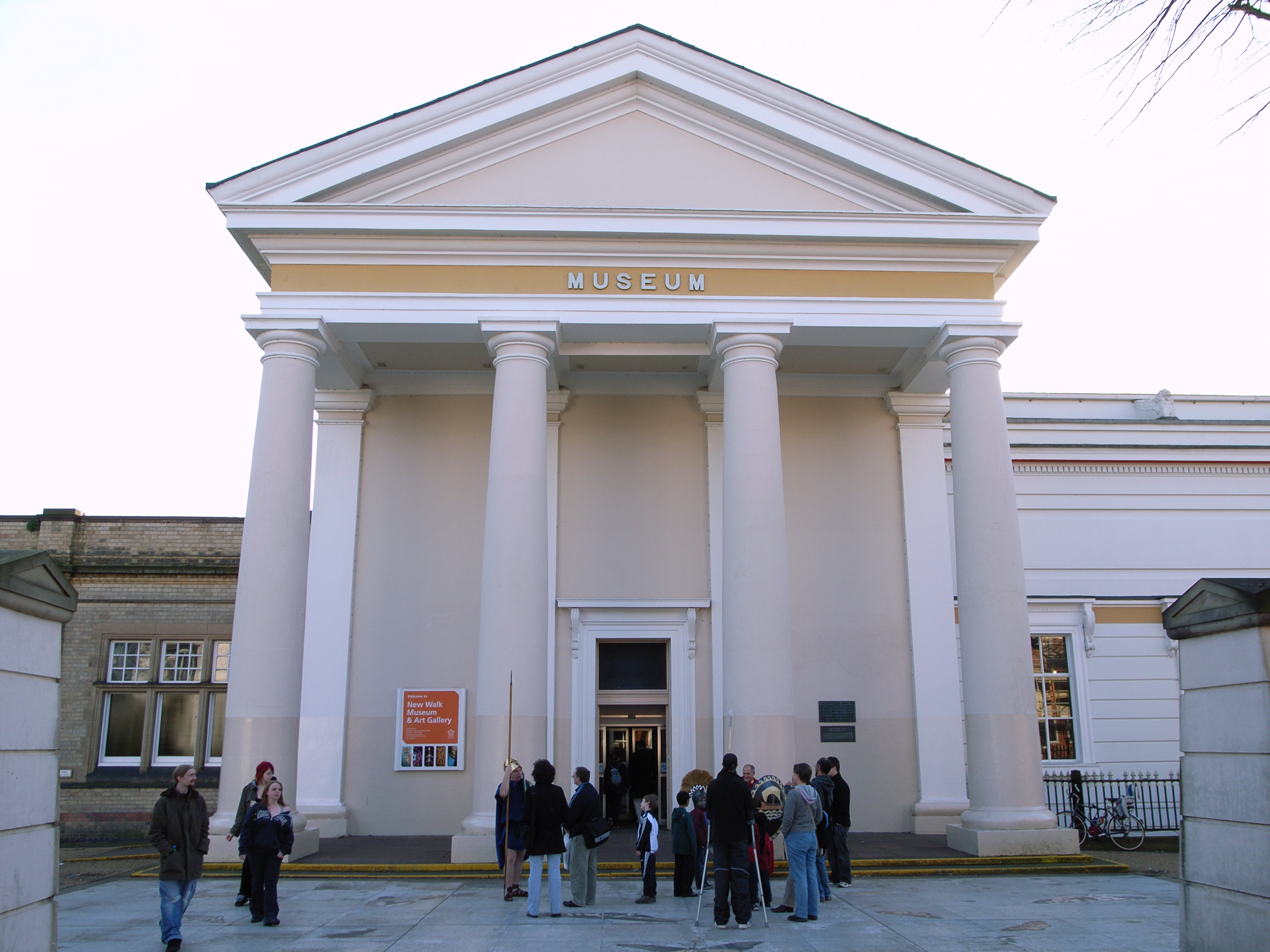
Leicester Leicester Museum & Art Gallery

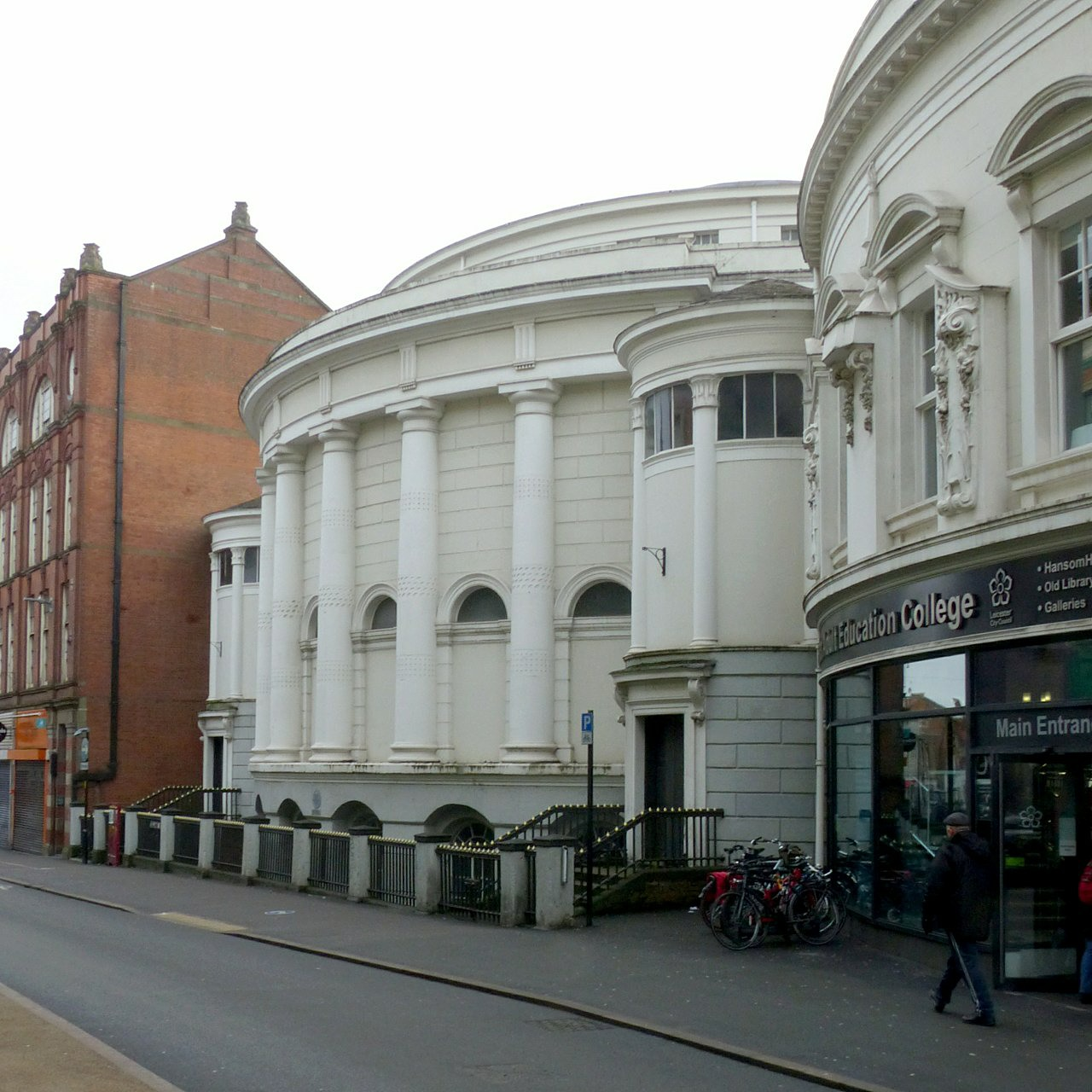
Belvoir Street Chapel, renamed Hansom Hall

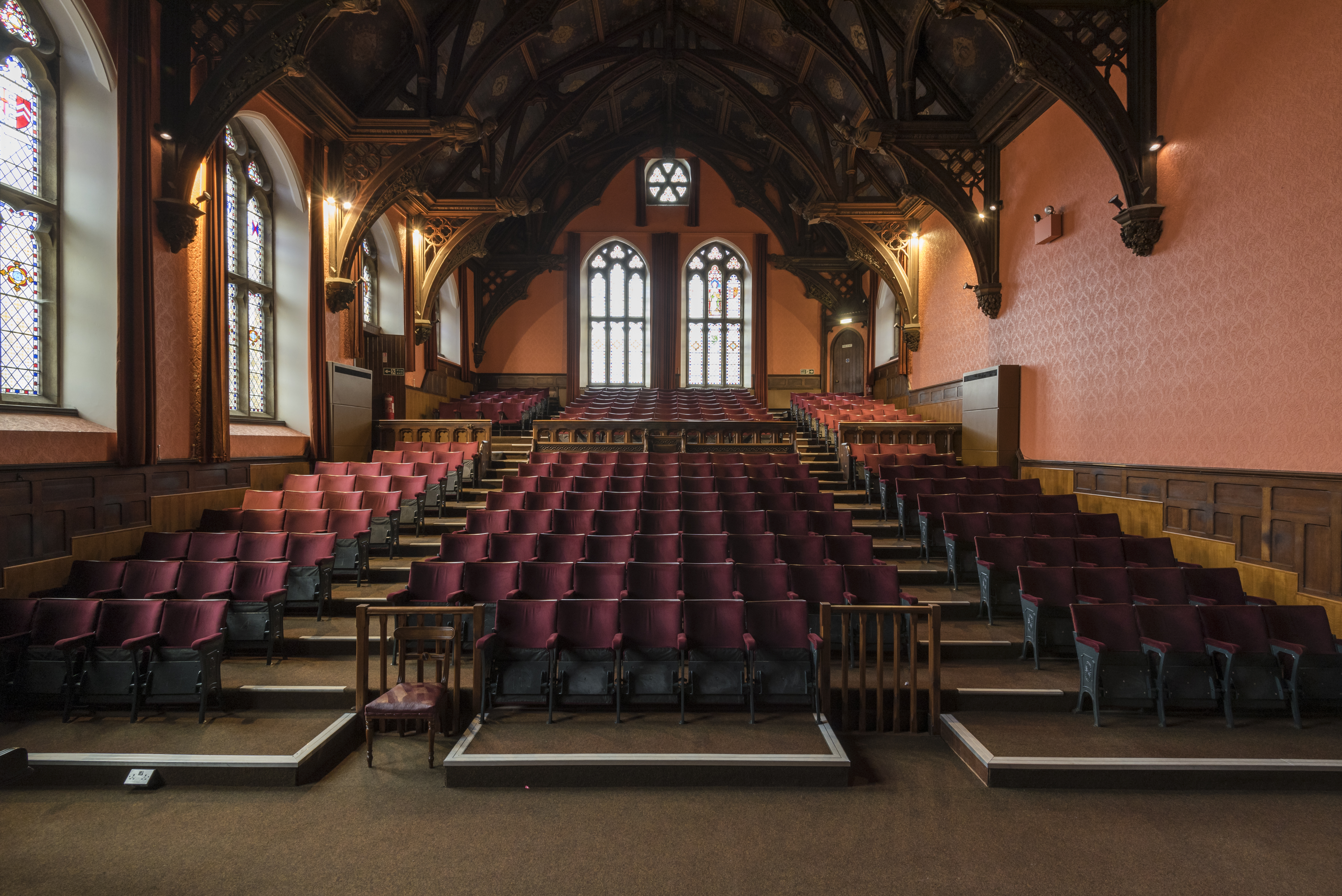
Joliet Junior College Theatre

== Sources ==
- Daffurn, John, 'Young and Hansom', The Victorian, No 71 November 2022, 11 (The Victorian Society, ISSN 1467-7970)
- Daffurn, John, George Glover (1812-1890): the unfulfilled potential of a Victorian architect (Stamford, UK: Eptex, 2022), pp. 4–8
- Harris, Penelope, The Architectural Achievement of Joseph Aloysius Hansom (1803–1882), Designer of the Hansom Cab, Birmingham Town Hall, and Churches of the Catholic Revival (The Edwin Mellen Press, 2010)
- Harris, Penelope, 'A Nomadic Mission: The Northern Works of the Catholic Architect J.A. Hansom 1803–82', Northern Catholic History 50: 24–40.
- Harris, Penelope, 'J.A. Hansom and E.W. Pugin at St Wilfrid, Ripon: a division of labour?' True Principles, the Journal of the Pugin Society, vol iv no iii Spring 2012, 261–267.
- Harris, Penelope, 'Joseph Aloysius Hansom (1803–82): His Yorkshire Works, Patronage and Contribution to the Catholic Revival', York Archaeological and Historical Journal, Vol no. 85, Issue no. 1, (2013), pp. 175–193.
- Harris, Penelope, 'An Anglo-French Enterprise: The Architects Hansom and the Clifford Family' The Journal of Historic Buildings & Places, Vol 61 (2017), pp. 92-123.
- Johnson, Michael A., 'The architecture of Dunn & Hansom' (Newcastle upon Tyne: University of Northumbria, MA Dissertation, 2003)
- Johnson, Michael A. (2008). "Architects to a Diocese: Dunn and Hansom of Newcastle". Northern Catholic History. 49: 3–17.
