= Charles Francis Hansom =

British architect

- Born: 27 July 1817; York
- Died: 30 November 1888 (aged 71)
- Occupation: Architect
- Projects: Clifton College, Malvern College

Charles Francis Hansom (27 July 1817 – 30 November 1888) was a Roman Catholic Victorian architect who primarily designed in the Gothic Revival style.

== Career ==
He was born to a Roman Catholic family in York. He was the brother of Joseph Aloysius Hansom, architect and creator of the Hansom cab, and father of the architect Edward Joseph Hansom. He practiced in partnership with his brother, Joseph, in London from 1854. This partnership was dissolved in 1859 when Charles established an independent practice in Bath with his son Edward (born 22 October 1842) as an articled clerk. He took his son into partnership in 1867, by which time the practice had moved to Bristol, with a large West Country practice of church and collegiate architecture. In Bristol he took on Benjamin Bucknall as an assistant.

== Clifton College ==
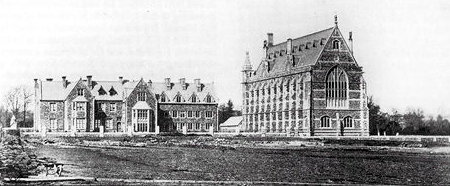
Clifton College's School House and Big School soon after they were built in the 1860s

The original Clifton College buildings were all designed by Hansom.

His first design at Clifton was for Big School (then a meeting hall and now the school canteen) and a proposed dining hall. Only the former was actually built and a small extra short wing was added in 1866. This is what now contains the Marshal's office and the new staircase into Big School.

Hansom was called back to the College in the 1870s and asked to design what is now the Percival Library and the open-cloister classrooms. This project was undertaken in two stages and largely completed by 1875, although the Wilson Tower was not built until 1890.

== Works (new built) ==
- Our Lady the Immaculate Conception Roman Catholic Church, Devizes, Wiltshire, 1865
- St Osburg's Church, Coventry, 1845
- St Anne's Church, Edge Hill, Liverpool, 1845–46
- Our Lady and St Alphonsus Church, Hanley Swan, Worcestershire, 1846
- St David Lewis and St Francis Xavier Church, Usk, Monmouthshire, 1847
- St David's Priory Church, Swansea, 1847
- Our Lady of Dolours chapel, Stapehill Abbey, Ferndown, Dorset, 1847–51
- Erdington Abbey, Erdington, Warwickshire, nr. Birmingham, 1848
- St Joseph's Church, Upton-upon-Severn, Worcestershire, 1850.
- St Mary and St John Church, Wolverhampton, West Midlands, 1851 to 1855.
- St Gregory's Roman Catholic Church, Cheltenham, Gloucestershire, 1854–77
- Plymouth Cathedral (with Joseph Hansom), 1856–58
- Our Lady of the Angels and St Peter in Chains Church, Stoke-on-Trent, 1857
- St Joseph's Church, Weston-super-Mare, 1858
- Little Malvern Court, Little Malvern, Worcestershire: west wing, 1860
- Eyre Memorial Chantry, Perrymead Roman Catholic cemetery, Lyncombe, Bath, Somerset, c.1860; altar carved by Boulton of Cheltenham to Hansom's design
- St John's, Bath, Somerset, 1861–63
- Holy Family Roman Catholic Church, Broxwood, Herefordshire, 1863
- Rhydd Court, Guarlford, Worcestershire: chapel, 1863
- Malvern College, Worcestershire, 1863–71
- Church of St Mary, Bradenstoke, Wiltshire, 1866
- St Pauls, Clifton, 1867
- Church of the Annunciation to the Blessed Virgin Mary, Souldern, Oxfordshire, 1869–70
- Woodchester Park, Nympsfield, Gloucestershire (first scheme)
- Christ Church, Barton Hill, Bristol, 1883 (demolished 1957)
- St Joseph and Teresa RC Church, Wells, Somerset, 1877
- St Clare's Abbey, Darlington (1856-7)

== Remodellings ==
- St Stephen's Church, Bristol, 1880s.

== Sources ==
- Clifton College archives
- Johnson, Michael A (2003). The architecture of Dunn & Hansom. MA Dissertation. Newcastle-upon-Tyne: University of Northumbria.
- Johnson, Michael A (2008). "Architects to a Diocese: Dunn and Hansom of Newcastle". Northern Catholic History (49): 3–17.
- Newman, John; Pevsner, Nikolaus (1972). Dorset. The Buildings of England. Harmondsworth: Penguin Books. p. 397. ISBN 0-14-071044-2.
- Pevsner, Nikolaus (1963). Herefordshire. The Buildings of England. Harmondsworth: Penguin Books. p. 93.
- Pevsner, Nikolaus (1968). Worcestershire. The Buildings of England. Harmondsworth: Penguin Books. pp. 167, 168, 175, 215.
- Verey, David (1970). Gloucestershire: The Vale and the Forest of Dean. The Buildings of England. Vol. 2. Harmondsworth: Penguin Books. p. 128.
- The Quick and the Dead: A Walk Round Some Bath Cemeteries. The Victorian Society: Avon Group. 1979. p. not stated.
