= Edward Joseph Hansom =

British architect (1842–1900)

- Born: 22 October 1842
- Died: 27 May 1900 (aged 57)
- Occupation: Architect
- Awards: President of the Northern Architectural Association
- Practice: Dunn and Hansom
- Buildings: Downside Abbey transepts

Edward Joseph Hansom (22 October 1842 – 27 May 1900) was an English Victorian architect who specialised in ecclesiastical buildings in Gothic Revival style, including many Roman Catholic churches.

He was the son of Charles Francis Hansom and the nephew of Joseph Aloysius Hansom (1803–1882), of an architectural dynasty from York. He was articled to his father in Bath in 1859 and was taken into partnership in 1867, when the practice was based in Bristol. Edward moved to Newcastle-upon-Tyne in 1871 to enter into partnership with Archibald Matthias Dunn (1832–1917), practising under the name of Dunn and Hansom.

Hansom was admitted ARIBA in 1868 and FRIBA in 1881. He served as President of the Northern Architects' Association in 1889–90 and was the first to represent the region on the RIBA Council.

After a long period of ill-health, Hansom suffered from depression such that he was unable to work. He shot himself at his office and died on 27 May 1900.

Notable work includes the transepts, representing the first phase of building, to Downside Abbey, Somerset (1882); St Bede's College, Alexandra Park, Manchester; Our Lady Star of the Sea Roman Catholic Church, North Berwick (1879); St Benet's Church, Sunderland (1888–9); St Mary's RC Cathedral, military memorial, Edinburgh (1889); Our Lady and St Oswin's Church, Tynemouth; (1890); the baptistery to St John's Church, Bath (1871), and St Joseph's Church, Hartlepool (1895).
