= List of monastic houses in Cornwall =

The following is a list of the monastic houses in Cornwall, England.

== Map ==
Locations of monastic houses in Cornwall

== Key to listing ==
Alien houses are included, as are smaller establishments such as cells and notable monastic granges (particularly those with resident monks), and also camerae of the military orders of monks (Knights Templar and Knights Hospitaller). Monastic hospitals are included where they had the status or function of an abbey, priory, or preceptor/commandery.

Abbreviations and key

Status of remains
Symbol	Status
None	Ruins
*	Current monastic function
^{+}	Current non-monastic ecclesiastic function (including remains incorporated into later structure)
^	Current non-ecclesiastic function (including remains incorporated into later structure) or redundant intact structure
^{$}	Remains limited to earthworks etc.
^{#}	No identifiable trace of the monastic foundation remains
^{~}	Exact site of monastic foundation unknown
^{≈}	Identification ambiguous or confused

Locations with names in italics indicate possible duplication (misidentification with another location) or non-existent foundations (either erroneous reference or proposed foundation never implemented) or ecclesiastical establishments with a monastic name but lacking actual monastic connection.

Trusteeship
EH	English Heritage
LT	Landmark Trust
NT	National Trust

Foundation	Image	Communities and provenance	Formal name or dedication & alternative names	References & location
Altarnon Monastery		probable monastery before 1066 (Note: Altarnon Monastery: cited by C. Henderson, "Parochial History of Cornwall", p. 54, Cornish Church Guide, 1925)	Altarnun Monastery	50°36′17″N 4°30′45″W
Bodmin — Abbey of St Mary & St Petroc^{*}		Augustinian Canons Regular (Canons Regular of the Lateran) founded 1881; raised to abbey status 1953		50°28′10″N 4°44′01″W
Bodmin Blackfriars		probable mistaken reference to Bodmin Greyfriars (Note: Bodmin 'Blackfriars' — given by John Leland, Itinerary; T. Tanner, Notitia Monastica p. 72, note n. gives this as a seemingly erroneous reference to Bodmin Greyfriars)		
Bodmin Greyfriars ^{#}		Franciscan Friars Minor, Conventual (under the Custody of Bristol) founded before 1260; dissolved 1538	Bodmin Greyfriars	50°28′47″N 4°43′11″W
Bodmin Priory ^{+}		Celtic monks abbey? purportedly founded 6th century by St Petroc; Benedictine? monks refounded 936; nuns? dissolved c.1113; monks or secular dissolved c.1124; Augustinian Canons Regular founded 1124; dissolved 27 February 1538; buildings destroyed apart from the parish church, in parochial use as Church of England parish church; church in use for secular and industrial purposes post-dissolution	Bodmin Monastery; Bodmin Abbey	50°28′14″N 4°42′56″W
Breage Grange		Cistercian monks grange dependent on Hailes, Gloucestershire; founded c.1300		
Cardinham Grange ^{#}		purported medieval monastery		50°28′17″N 4°39′05″W (possible)
Constantyne Monastery		Celtic monks (Note: Constantyne Monastery: cited by C. Henderson, "Parochial History of Cornwall", p. 78, The Cornish Church Guide, 1925)		
Crantock Monastery		Celtic monks probably founded by a St Carrock; secular before 1066; recorded extant 1086; secular canons collegiate refounded 1236; dissolved 1549	St Corontocus ____________________; St Karentoc's Monastery	50°24′11″N 5°06′43″W
Dingerein Monastery		Celtic monks (Note: Dingerein Monastery: cited by C. Henderson, "Parochial History of Cornwall", p. 100, The Cornish Church Guide, 1925)	Dinurrin Monastery	
Gulval Monastery		Celtic monks (Note: Gulval Monastery: cited by C. Henderson, "Parochial History of Cornwall", p. 104, The Cornish Church Guide, 1925) founded by St Gudwall (Wolvela), from Wales	Dinurrin Monastery	
Kea Monastery, Old Kea		Celtic monks (Note: Kea Monastery Monastery: cited by C. Henderson, "Parochial History of Cornwall", p. 116, The Cornish Church Guide, 1925) supposed site of monastery recorded extant 1086	St Cheus Monastery; Old Kea Monastery	50°14′10″N 5°01′27″W (supposed)
Lammana Priory, Looe Island		Benedictine monks founded 6th century; Benedictine monks cell dependent on Glastonbury and chapel; founded before 1114; disposed of by Glastonbury between 1239 and 1329; chantry chapel of the Dawnay family before 1329; dissolved 1549	The Priory Church of St Michael, Lammana ____________________; Lammana Chapel	50°20′13″N 4°26′57″W
Lansallos Monastery		Celtic monks (Note: Lansallos Monastery: cited by C. Henderson, "Parochial History of Cornwall", p. 133, The Cornish Church Guide, 1925) patronised by St Ildierna	St Salwys (St Alwys)	
Lannachebran Cell, St Keverne		monks founded c.6th century (Note: Lannachebran Monastery: cited by C. Henderson, "Parochial History of Cornwall", pp. 117–8, The Cornish Church Guide, 1925 and W. Dugdale, Monasticon Anglicanum v, p. 682) under the tutelage of St Achebran; secular collegiate refounded before 1086; Cistercian monks grange dependent on Beaulieu, Hampshire; founded before 1263; dissolved 1527; granted to Francis, Earl of Bedford 1559/60	St Keiran's Monastery; St Keverne's Monastery; Lanachebran Monastery	50°03′03″N 5°05′13″W
Launcells Priory		Celtic monks (Note: Launcells Monastery: cited by C. Henderson, "Parochial History of Cornwall", p. 136, The Cornish Church Guide, 1925) secular at Norman Conquest; Augustinian Canons Regular		
Launceston Friary(?)		Friars (Note: Launceston Friary — T. Tanner, Notitia Monastica p. 72, cites mention of friary in addition to the abbey or priory by Mr Carew, Survey of Cornwall, f.81b/f.116b)		
Launceston Priory, earlier site		monks or secular founded before c.830; secular canons to c.1126		
Launceston Priory ^{+}		Augustinian Canons Regular founded 1127; dissolved 1539; restored 1871; in parochial use as the Church of St Thomas the Apostle		50°38′28″N 4°21′58″W
Lanwethinoc Monastery^{~}, Padstow		Celtic monks founded by Bishop Wethinoc; site possibly occupied by the medieval Church of St Petroc at Padstow	Lanuthinoc Monastery; St Petroc's Church; Petroc-stow Monastery; Padstow Monastery	50°32′28″N 4°56′35″W (possible)
Madron Monastery		Celtic monks before 12th century		50°07′54″N 5°33′53″W (approx)
Manaccan Monastery		Celtic monks		50°04′57″N 5°07′35″W (approx)
Mawgan in Pydar Franciscan Monastery *		Franciscan monks	The Franciscan Monastery of St Joseph and St Anne, St Mawgan in Pydar	
Minster Priory ^{+}		Celtic monks? founded before 1066; Benedictine monks alien house: daughter house of the Abbey of St. Sergius, Angers founded before 1190 by William de Bottreaux; dissolved before 1407; slight remains of priory near the medieval parochial church	The Priory Church of Saint Materiana, Minster St Mertherian ____________________; Talcarne Priory; Minster Cell	50°40′59″N 4°40′33″W
Paul Grange		Cistercian monks grange(?) dependent on Hailes, Gloucestershire; founded c.1300(?)		
Probus Monastery		Celtic monks or secular founded 924, purportedly by King Athelstan; dissolved 940; secular canons collegiate founded before 1086 (or during the reign of Henry I, who granted the church to Exeter Cathedral 1120); dissolved 1549		50°17′45″N 4°56′39″W
Rialton Grange ^{#}		Augustinian Canons Regular chief manor or grange of Bodmin; manor house built 15th century	Rieltone Grange	50°25′13″N 5°01′55″W (approx)
St Anthony's Monastery, St Anthony-in-Meneage		Celtic monks (Note: St Anthony-in-Meneage Monastery: cited by C. Henderson, "Parochial History of Cornwall", p. 55, The Cornish Church Guide, 1925); Benedictine monks alien house: grange of St-Serge, Angers; founded from Brittany?; became parochial after 1066; became a grange of Tywardreath before mid-12th century (though referred to as a cell); founded after 1088; dissolved after 1381	Lantenning Monastery	50°04′58″N 5°06′32″W (approx)
St Anthony-in-Roseland Priory ^		Augustinian Canons Regular priory cell dependent on Plympton, Devon founded before 1288; dissolved 1538; remains incorporated into house named 'Place House' built on site 16th Century	St Anthony-in-Roseland Cell	50°08′53″N 5°00′49″W (approx)
St Buryan's Monastery, St Buryan		Celtic monks secular collegiate founded c.930, purportedly by King Athelstan; dissolved 1545; parish church (SS Andrew, Thomas the Martyr, Nicholas and Beriana) on site rebuilt 13th century, though mostly now 15th century		50°03′43″N 5°38′54″W (approx)
St Carrok's Monastery ^{#}, St Winnow		Celtic monks (Note: St Carrok's Monastery: cited by C. Henderson, "Parochial History of Cornwall", p. 213, The Cornish Church Guide, 1925) dissolved/destroyed before 1086?: seized by Robert, Count of Mortain; Cluniac monks alien house: cell dependent on Montacute, Somerset; founded 1100-40: granted to Montacute by William, son of Robert c.1100; became denizen: independent from 1407; dissolved 1537; granted to Laurence Courtney 1534/5	St Carroc Monastery; St Syriac's Monastery; St Cyricus and St Julitta's Monastery; St Cadix's Monastery; St Syriac's Cell	50°22′58″N 4°39′10″W (approx)
St German's Priory ^{+}		Celtic monks possibly founded 7th century; secular canons episcopal diocesan cathedral founded c.936; see transferred to new site at Crediton, Devon 1042; monks or secular founded 1042; Augustinian Canons Regular refounded 1184 (1161-87); dissolved 2 March 1539; granted to Catherine Champernoun, John Ridgeway and others 1541/2; now in use as parish church; remains of claustral buildings incorporated into Port Eliot House	The Priory Church of Saint German, Saint Germans	50°23′48″N 4°18′35″W
St Goran's Monastery, St Goran		Celtic monks (Note: St Goran's Monastery: cited by C. Henderson, "Parochial History of Cornwall", p. 102, The Cornish Church Guide, 1925) founded 6th century; patronised by St Goran in the time of St Petroc; dissolved after 1083; church and lands granted to the college of Glasney 1269		50°14′35″N 4°48′04″W (approx)
St Kew Cell ^{~}		monks (Note: St Kew's Monastery: cited by C. Henderson, "Parochial History of Cornwall", p. 119, Cornish Church Guide, 1928) founded 6th century (in the time of St Samson); purported Augustinian cell secular minster status confirmed by King Edgar, who granted land to the minster 961-3; secular collegiate clerks or secular canons until 1283; Augustinian Secular Canons — from Plympton, Devon until before 1283 church rebuilt 1496 and restored 1883	St Daw (or St Docco) Saint Kew (from 1440)	50°33′29″N 4°47′40″W
St Matthew's Monastery		uncertain order and foundation		
St Mawgan Monastery ^{+}		Celtic monks (Note: St Mawgan/Lanherne Monastery: cited by C. Henderson, "Parochial History of Cornwall", p. 156, The Cornish Church Guide, 1925) lands passed to the Bishop before 1085; Cluniac monks; Carmelite convent possibly built on site 16th century	Lanherne Monastery; St Mawgan in Pydar Monastery	50°27′45″N 5°01′31″W (approx)
St Michael's Mount Priory ^{+}		Saxon Benedictine? monks 8th century-11th century; Benedictine monks founded 1087-90; church consecrated 1135; alien house: dependent on Mont-St-Michel, Normandy granted by Edward the Confessor to Mont-St-Michel before 1050; seized during wars with the French 1362; dissolved c.1414; granted by Henry VI to King's College, Cambridge; granted by Edward IV to Syon Abbey; used alternately as fortress and monastery and private residence with public access; (NT)		50°06′59″N 5°28′42″W
St Neot's Monastery, St Neot		Celtic monks (Note: St Neot's Monastery: cited by C. Henderson, "Parochial History of Cornwall", pp. 179–83, The Cornish Church Guide, 1925) founded 6th century?; dissolved after 1084	Saint Aniet	50°28′28″N 4°33′58″W
St Piran's Monastery, Perranzabuloe		Celtic monks founded 6th century?; dissolved before c.1085		50°21′54″N 5°08′49″W (approx)
Saltash Monastery		uncertain order and foundation		
Scilly Priory		Celtic monks, monastic cells founded before 1066; Benedictine monks cell dependent on Tavistock, Devon; founded before 1114; dissolved c.1538; Tresco Abbey Gardens created by Augustus Smith around the priory remains in 1834	The Priory Church of St Nicholas, Scilly ____________________; Tresco Cell	49°56′51″N 6°19′44″W
Sclerder Abbey ^{+}		Dames de la Retraite founded c.1843; dissolved 1852; Franciscan Recollects founded 1858; dissolved 1864; Carmelite founded 1864; dissolved 1871; Sisters of the Sacred Hearts of Jesus and Mary founded 1904; dissolved 1910; Minoresses — from Rennes 1914-1920; Minoresses — from Bullingham 1922-1981; Franciscan c.1925; Carmelite — from Quidenham 1981-2014; Chemin Neuf 2014-; extant		50°20′53″N 4°30′18″W
Sele Priory		Benedictine monks alien house: dependent on St-Florent-de-Saumur; founded before 1126; dissolved 1396		
Temple property ^{+}		Knights Templar; Knights Hospitaller		50°31′49″N 4°37′07″W (approx)
Temple Templars Preceptory ^{#}		Knights Templar founded 12th century; dissolved 1308-12; asserted to have become a preceptory of Knights Hospitallers (Note: Temple Preceptory: cited by C. Henderson, "Parochial History of Cornwall", p.112 & 212, Cornish Church Guide, 1928) — (disputed)		50°28′41″N 4°23′50″W (approx)
Tintagel Monastery		remains interpreted as Celtic monastic dependent on Bodmin (Note: Tintagel Monastery: cited by C. Henderson, "Parochial History of Cornwall", pp. 203–6, The Cornish Church Guide, 1925); founded c.350; popular tradition as medieval Benedictine nunnery: evidence lacking; Norman castle built on site; current academic consensus regards earlier settlement as secular		50°40′07″N 4°45′39″W
Trebeigh Preceptory ^{#}		Knights Templar (purportedly); Knights Hospitaller founded before 1199 "by the bounty of" Henry de Pomeral and Reginald Marsh; united with Ansty before 1432; dissolved after 1557/8; granted to Henry Wilby and George Blythe 1573/4	Treleigh Preceptory; Turleigh Preceptory	50°28′46″N 4°23′30″W
Tregonan Cell, St Ewe		Celtic monks (Note: Tregonan Monastery: cited by C. Henderson, "Parochial History of Cornwall", p. 118, The Cornish Church Guide, 1925) dependent on St Keverne's Monastery founded 6th century; dissolved 11th century		50°03′19″N 5°05′21″W (approx)
Tregonan Grange		Cistercian monks grange of Beaulieu, Hampshire founded before 1263; dissolved before 1527; "considerable remains" existing 1755 have since disappeared	St Keverne Grange	50°03′08″N 5°05′25″W
Tregony Priory ^{~}		Augustinian Canons Regular alien house: priory cell dependent on Le Val, Bayeux; founded before 1125(?); granted to Merton, Surrey 1267	The Priory Church of St James, Tregony ____________________; Tregoney Priory	50°15′59″N 4°55′03″W (conjectured site)
Truro — Convent of the Epiphany ^		Community of the Epiphany, Anglican		50°16′21″N 5°03′32″W
Truro Blackfriars		Dominican Friars (under the Visitation of London) founded before 1259 (during the reign of Henry III) by the Reskimer family; (church consecrated 1259-60); dissolved 1538; granted to Edward Anglianby 1553/4		50°15′48″N 5°03′18″W
Tywardreath Priory		Benedictine monks alien house: daughter house of St-Serge, Angers founded c.1088 by Richard fitz Turold, Lord of Cardinham Castle, chief baron of Cornwall (or 1169 "by some noblemen", or 1135); became denizen: independent c.1400; dissolved 1536; granted to Edward, Earl of Hertford 1542/3	St Andrew ____________________; Truwardraith Priory	50°21′24″N 4°41′38″W

== See also ==
- List of monastic houses in England
