= Church of the Assumption of Our Lady, Torquay =

Church in Devon, England

Church of the Assumption of Our Lady
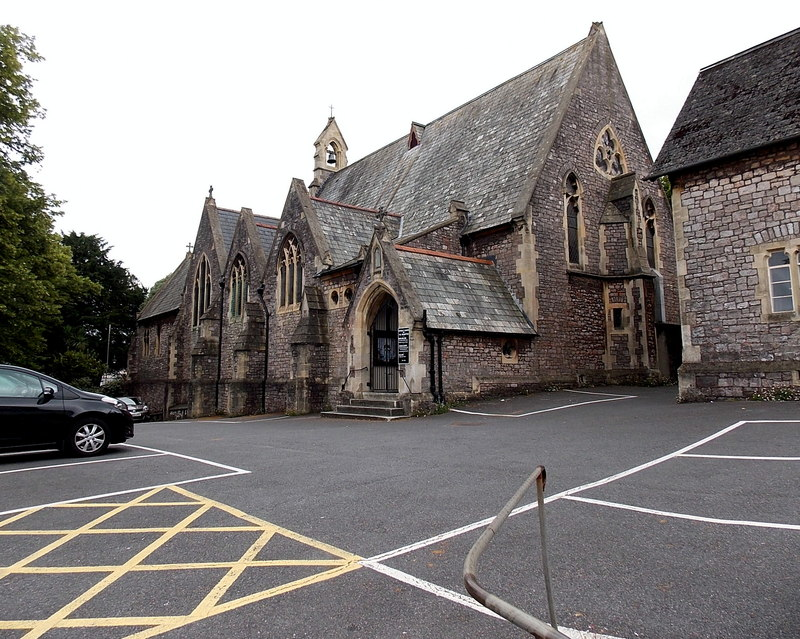
- Church of the Assumption of Our Lady
- 50.4662°N 3.5319°W
- OS grid reference: SX 91376 64048
- Location: Torquay
- Country: England
- Denomination: Roman Catholic
- Website: AssumptionOfOurLady.org

History
- Status: Parish church
- Dedication: Assumption of Mary

Architecture
- Functional status: Active
- Heritage designation: Grade II listed
- Designated: 3 May 1994
- Architect: Joseph Hansom
- Style: Gothic Revival
- Groundbreaking: 24 April 1853
- Completed: 17 February 1854

Administration
- Province: Southwark
- Diocese: Plymouth
- Deanery: Torbay
- Parish: Assumption of Our Lady

The Church of the Assumption of Our Lady is a Roman Catholic parish church in Torquay, Devon, England. It was built from 1853 to 1854 and designed by Joseph Hansom in the Gothic revival style. It is located on the junction of Abbey Road and Warren Road in the centre of the town. It is a Grade II listed building.

== History ==
=== Construction ===
Robert Shedden Sulyarde Cary of the Cary family at Torre Abbey gave the land on which the church was built. On 24 April 1853, the foundation stone was laid by the Bishop of Plymouth George Errington. The church was designed by Joseph Hansom who also designed Plymouth Cathedral and Our Lady Help of Christians and St Denis Church in St Marychurch, Torquay. On 17 February 1854, the church was opened and consecrated.

=== Developments ===
In 1857, the presbytery and school were built. Both were designed by Joseph Hansom. In 1858, the south aisle and chapel were built. In the 1860s the stained glass windows were installed in the church, they were made by Hardman & Co. In 1981, the interior was reordered and redecorated.

== Parish ==
The church is in the parish of the Assumption of Our Lady, which also includes Holy Angels Church in Torquay. The Church of the Assumption of Our Lady has two Sunday Masses at 6:00pm on Saturday and at 10:30am on Sunday. Holy Angels Church has a Sunday Mass at 8:30am.

== See also ==
- Diocese of Plymouth
- Media related to Our Lady of the Assumption Church, Torquay at Wikimedia Commons
