= Our Lady Help of Christians and St Denis Church, Torquay =

Our Lady and St Denis Church
- Our Lady Help of Christians and St Denis Church
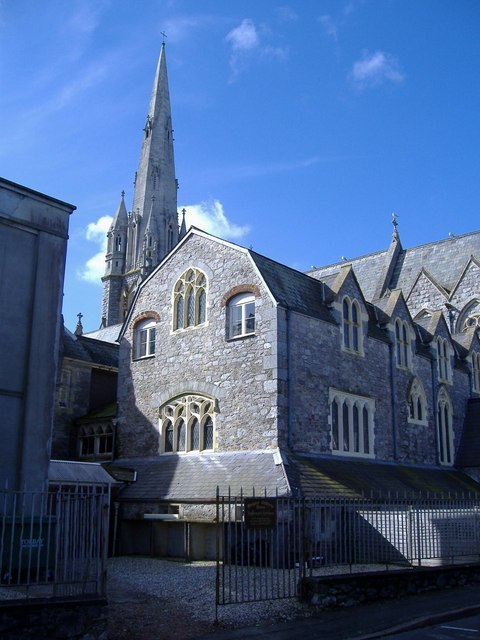
- Our Lady and St Denis Church
- 50.4828°N 3.5248°W
- OS grid reference: SX 91914 65881
- Location: St Marychurch, Torquay
- Country: England
- Denomination: Roman Catholic
- Website: OurLadyandStDenis.org.uk

History
- Status: Parish church
- Dedication: Mary Help of Christians; Saint Denis

Architecture
- Functional status: Active
- Heritage designation: Grade II* listed
- Designated: 14 February 1972
- Architect: Joseph Hansom
- Style: Gothic Revival
- Completed: 1869

Administration
- Province: Southwark
- Diocese: Plymouth
- Deanery: Torbay
- Parish: Our Lady Help of Christians & St Denis

Our Lady Help of Christians and St Denis Church is a Roman Catholic parish church in St Marychurch, Torquay, Devon, England. It was built in 1869 and designed by Joseph Hansom in the Gothic Revival style. It is located between Priory Road and St Margaret's Road in St Marychurch. It is a Grade II* listed building.

== History ==
=== Foundation ===
In 1864, Dominican nuns came to St Marychurch. They were invited by the Bishop of Plymouth William Vaughan. A house, Southampton Villa, was bought in the area. It housed the nuns, while an orphanage, St Mary's Priory, was built on the site.

=== Construction ===
In 1867, a Mr Potts Chatto, from the Daison estate, in thanksgiving for his son, Denis, recovering from a serious illness, paid for the construction of a church in the grounds of Southampton Villa. Joseph Hansom, who designed Plymouth Cathedral and Church of the Assumption of Our Lady, Torquay, was commissioned to design the church. In 1869, the church was opened. Southampton Villa was later demolished and the tower and spire of the church were built in its place. In 1871, a convent for the nuns next to the church was opened. The convent included a school and elementary school with a capacity for 200 children. An organ and lady chapel were later added to the church, they were paid for by Mrs Potts-Chatto.

== Parish ==
The church is in the parish of Our Lady Help of Christians and St Denis. It has two Sunday Masses at 6:00pm on Saturday and 10:00am.

== See also ==
- Diocese of Plymouth
- Media related to Church of Our Lady Help of Christians and St Denis, Torquay at Wikimedia Commons
