= Deanery of Cornwall =

Roman Catholic deanery

The Deanery of Cornwall is a Roman Catholic deanery within the Diocese of Plymouth. It consists of parishes in Cornwall with the addition of one parish in Devon.

== Parishes ==
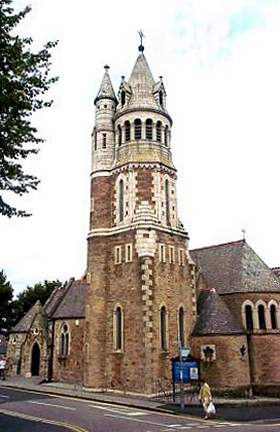
St Mary Immaculate, Falmouth

St Paul's Church, Tintagel

The parishes in the Deanery of Cornwall within the Diocese of Plymouth are:

- Bodmin : St Mary and St. Petroc
- Bude : St Peter's
- Callington : Our Lady of Victories
- Camborne : St John Baptist
- Culdrose: The Holy Redeemer
- Falmouth : St Mary Immaculate
- Gunnislake : St Joseph's
- Helston : St Mary's
- Hayle : St Joseph's
- Holsworthy (Devon) (at St Peter & St Paul)
- Isles of Scilly : Our Lady Star of the Sea
- Launceston : St Cuthbert Mayne
- Looe : Our Lady and St. Nicholas
- Looe : Sclerder Abbey
- Liskeard : Our Lady and St. Neot
- Mawnan Smith: St Edward the Confessor
- Mullion : St Michael the Archangel
- Newquay : The Most Holy Trinity
- Padstow : St Saviour and St. Petroc
- Penzance : The Immaculate Conception
- Perranporth : Christ the King
- Redruth : The Assumption
- St Agnes : Our Lady Star of the Sea
- St Austell : St Augustine of Hippo
- St Ives : Sacred Heart and St Ia
- St Mawes: Our Lady of the Sea and St Anthony
- St Mawgan in Pydar: Franciscan Monastery of SS. Joseph and Anne
- Saltash : Our Lady of the Angels
- Tintagel : St. Paul the Apostle
- Torpoint : Our Lady Star of the Sea, HMS Raleigh
- Torpoint : St Joan of Arc
- Truro : Our Lady of the Portal and St Piran
- Wadebridge : St Michael
