= St Mary Immaculate Church, Falmouth =

St Mary's Church
- St Mary Immaculate Church
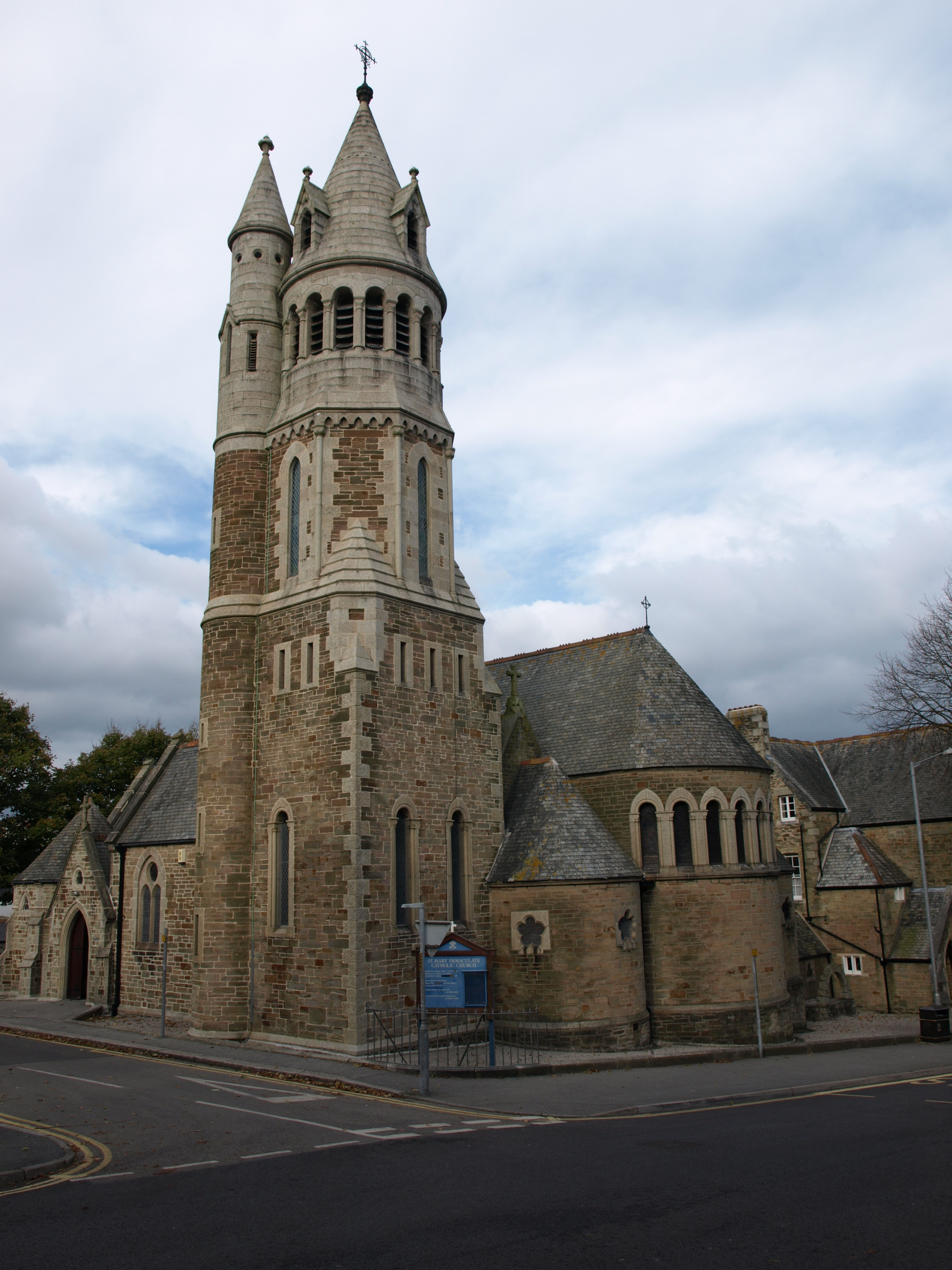
- St Mary's Church
- 50.1528°N 5.0752°W
- Location: Falmouth, Cornwall
- Country: England
- Denomination: Roman Catholic
- Website: FalmouthCatholicChurch.org.uk

History
- Status: Parish church
- Founded: 1868
- Dedication: Immaculate Conception

Architecture
- Functional status: Active
- Heritage designation: Grade II listed
- Designated: 24 April 1996
- Architect(s): Joseph Hansom; Joseph Stanislaus Hansom
- Style: Blend of Gothic and Romanesque
- Groundbreaking: 1868
- Completed: 26 August 1869

Administration
- Province: Southwark
- Diocese: Plymouth
- Deanery: Cornwall Deanery
- Parish: St Mary Immaculate

St Mary's Church or St Mary Immaculate Church is a Roman Catholic parish church in Falmouth, Cornwall, England, United Kingdom. It was built from 1868 to 1869 and designed by Joseph Hansom. The architecture of the church, according to Historic England is a blend of "Gothic and Burgundian Romanesque styles". It is located on the corner of Kimberley Place and Killigrew Street. It was extended by Hansom's son Joseph Stanislaus Hansom in 1881 and it is a Grade II listed building.

== History ==
=== Foundation ===
By 1800, a Catholic oratory existed in Falmouth, inside a warehouse, by the port. In 1803, the oratory was replaced by a chapel after it was burnt down. Next to the chapel was a house for the priest. The priest that served the mission in Falmouth was a Franciscan, Fr Ignatius Casemore. In 1814, a new customs house was built and the chapel and the house had to move. In 1818, the priest was French, Abbé Jean Baptiste de la Grésille. He received funds for a new church from French aristocrats. On 24 October 1821, the new church was opened. It could accommodate 150 people and it was built to be indiscreet, resembling two semi-detached houses.

=== Construction ===
By the 1860s, with the local Catholic population increasing, a new larger church needed to be built. The site for the current church was bought from John Wodehouse, 1st Earl of Kimberley. The priest at the time was Canon William Casey. He commissioned Joseph Hansom to design the church. Building work started in 1868. On 26 August 1869, the church was opened in a ceremony presided by William Vaughan, Bishop of Plymouth, with William Ullathorne, Bishop of Birmingham. In 1881, the sacristy and tower and spire were completed by Joseph Stanislaus Hansom. In 1886, a parish hall was built. A school room was established in the hall. It has previously been in the church crypt.

=== Developments ===
In 1908, the baptistery and porch were added, according to the original design of the church by Joseph Hansom. They were added by the priest at the time, Canon James Burns. He did it in the memory of Canon Casey. Around this time, an organ was also installed. In 1926, a Lourdes grotto was built off the north aisle. During World War II, Falmouth was a target of bombing. One bomb fell close to the church, damaging the roof and windows. In 1946 Canon George Cantell prepared the church for its consecration. On 8 September 1948, the church was consecrated by the Bishop of Plymouth Francis Grimshaw.

== Parish ==
The parish of St Mary Immaculate Church also includes St Edward’s Church in Mawnan Smith. The priest at St Mary Immaculate Church is also the parish priest of St Mary's Church in Heston that also serves St Michael the Archangel Church in Mullion. St Mary Immaculate Church has two Sunday Masses at 6:00pm on Saturday and at 10:30am on Sunday. St Edward’s Church in Mawnan Smith has one Sunday Mass at 9:00am.

== See also ==
- Diocese of Plymouth
- Media related to Saint Mary Church, Falmouth, Cornwall at Wikimedia Commons
