= Abbotskerswell Priory =

Former priory in Devon, England

Coordinates: 50.5104°N 3.6037°W

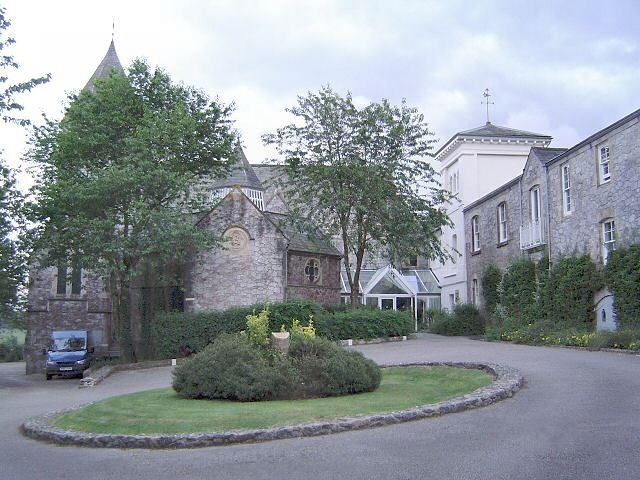
St Augustine's Priory - Abbotskerswell.

Abbotskerswell Priory, on the outskirts of the village of Abbotskerswell, near Newton Abbot, Devon, England, was the home of a community of Augustinian nuns from 1861 until 1983. It has now been converted into apartments for retirees.

== Abbotsleigh House ==
Abbotsleigh House was built on high ground on the outskirts of Abbotskerswell during 1847-48. The land had formerly belonged to the Abbot of Sherborne. The house, with about 36 acres (150,000 m^{2}) of land, was purchased by the Catholic Church in February 1860, and became the hub around which the new Priory of St. Augustine was built. During those early days it was sometimes known as Abbots Leigh Priory.

Joseph Hansom was appointed to prepare plans for buildings to accommodate 50 nuns. Hansom had recently completed work on Plymouth Cathedral, but is probably better known as the designer of Hansom Cabs. His ground plan for the whole development is still available for inspection at the Priory and, although later details were completed by Benjamin Bucknall, the general layout is as he originally planned it. The convent wing was completed by the autumn of 1861 and the new Church of the Holy Ghost was completed in autumn 1863. The east, or guest, wing and the north services wing were added during the next 20 years.

== The nuns ==
In 1794 a group of English nuns living in St. Monica's convent in Louvain, Belgium, was driven back to England by the French Revolution. They lived in Amesbury, Wiltshire, for five years but in 1800 they moved on to Spetisbury in Dorset. Here they created a boarding school for about 40 young ladies at what became known as St. Monica's Priory. In 1861 they found their final home in Abbotskerswell at the instigation of the Bishop of Plymouth, William Vaughan. Their experiences during the revolution may explain why Hansom was instructed to build two elaborate escape tunnels at the priory.

At Abbotskerswell Priory the nuns lived as an enclosed order and had very little communication with the village until about 1952. As is traditional in monasteries of this kind, local people were admitted to worship in a small side chapel which was so arranged that they could follow services being conducted in the church, but could not see the nuns. Village residents recall that during the 1960s the nuns were given more freedom to associate and to sell produce such as honey and eggs from their small farm.

The particular work of the community was reparation for the sins of mankind. They prayed for the conversion of sinners and the spread of the faith, especially in England. The postulants and novices were trained in singing and reciting the Divine Office. Besides taking part in the domestic work of the community they were trained in various handicrafts according to their gifts and talents. Their time was largely devoted to religious exercises, daily Mass and Benediction of the Blessed Sacrament and the Divine Office in Choir, the sisters each taking their appointed watch, day and night.

Among the relics which were preserved at the Priory was the hair shirt of Sir Thomas More, presented for safe keeping by Margaret Clements (1508–1570), his adopted daughter. It is now in the custody of Buckfast Abbey, near Buckfastleigh in Devon.

== Redevelopment ==
By the 1960s the buildings had started to fall into disrepair and the number of nuns slowly declined, the last three departing in March 1983. In 1985 a local company, Clennon Developments, purchased the property to develop as a retirement complex and the project was launched in April 1987. A second block, named Priory Court, was completed by the middle of 1991 and the small farmhouse and various outbuildings adjacent to Priory Road were converted into seven cottages by 1997, becoming known as Priory Yard.

In 2011 the priory was purchased by Retirement Villages Ltd who continue to run it as a retirement complex.
