= David M. Rogers =

David M. Rogers may refer to:

- David McGregor Rogers (1772–1824), farmer and political figure in Upper Canada
- David Rogers (librarian) (1917–1995), head of Special Collections at the Bodleian Library
- Dave Rogers (Massachusetts politician), American state legislator serving in the Massachusetts House of Representatives
