= Miscarriage & Infant Loss Memorial Book =

The Miscarriage & Infant Loss Memorial Book was a prayer request facility, open for new entries from 1995 to 2011, for those who suffered the loss of a baby from conception to three years old. It is kept at the Church of St Paul the Apostle in Tintagel, Cornwall, United Kingdom, where this book is placed on the altar at all Masses.

== History ==
The Miscarriage & Infant Loss Memorial Book was founded by Myke and Dr Miriam Rosenthal-English of Füssen in Bavaria after the loss of their first baby "Ruth" aged 14 weeks due to miscarriage in 1995. Since then the Memorial Book project grew from one which served the Roman Catholic Diocese of Plymouth into one which served people of all beliefs, worldwide. On February 27, 2011, after 16 years the Memorial Book was finally closed; the related website now refers those in need of prayer for their lost babies to Poor Clare Sisters in Wales.
