= Christopher Budd (bishop) =

British Roman Catholic bishop (1937–2023)

The Right Reverend Christopher Budd
- Bishop Emeritus of Plymouth
- Province: Southwark
- Diocese: Plymouth
- Appointed: 19 November 1985
- Installed: 15 January 1986
- Term ended: 9 November 2013
- Predecessor: Cyril Edward Restieaux
- Successor: Mark O'Toole

Orders
- Ordination: 8 July 1962
- Consecration: 15 January 1986 by Cyril Edward Restieaux

Personal details
- Born: Hugh Christopher Budd; 27 May 1937 Romford, Essex, England
- Died: 1 April 2023 (aged 85) Lyme Regis, Dorset, England
- Denomination: Roman Catholic

Hugh Christopher Budd (27 May 1937 – 1 April 2023) was a British Roman Catholic prelate who served as the 8th Bishop of Plymouth.

== Early life and education ==
Born in Romford, Essex (now East London), United Kingdom, to John and Phyllis Mary Budd, he was educated at St Mary's Primary School, Hornchurch and at St Ignatius College, Stamford Hill. Budd studied at Cotton College, a minor seminary, before moving to St Thomas' Seminary, Grove Park, and completing his studies at the Venerable English College in Rome in 1962. Budd was ordained a priest in Rome on 8 July 1962 for service in the Roman Catholic Diocese of Brentwood. Budd was studying at the Venerable English College during the sitting of the Second Vatican Council, which would later shape his episcopal ministry.

== Priestly ministry ==
After ordination, Budd continued studying to become a Doctor of Theology, and was a tutor in Theology at the Venerable English College until 1971. In 1976, he became a theology lecturer at Newman College, and was appointed rector of St John's Seminary, Wonersh, in 1979.

He remained in this post for six years, before becoming an administrator at Brentwood Cathedral, until he was appointed as Bishop of Plymouth to succeed Bishop Cyril Restiaux by John Paul II.

== Episcopal ministry ==
Budd was appointed Bishop of Plymouth on 19 November 1985 and received episcopal ordination on 15 January 1986. He would be the Bishop of Plymouth for 28 years, during which time he was influenced by the Second Vatican Council and its message of ecumenism.

Whilst bishop, Budd served as a member of the Department for Social Justice of the Catholic Bishops Conference of England and Wales, as well as Director of the Catholic Agency for Social Concern between 2002 and 2010.

His successor, Mark O'Toole, was appointed on 9 November 2013 by Pope Francis.

== Later life and death ==
In retirement Budd split his time between Lyme Regis in Dorset and Scilly Isles.

Budd died from cancer at his home in Lyme Regis, on 1 April 2023, at the age of 85.

His funeral took place on 5 May 2023, at Sacred Heart Church, Exeter, with Archbishop John Wilson of Southwark presiding. He was buried at Buckfast Abbey on the same day.

Catholic Church titles
Preceded by Cyril Edward Restieaux	Bishop of Plymouth; 1986–2013	Succeeded by Mark O'Toole
