= Sacred Heart Church, Exeter =

Coordinates: 50.7215°N 3.5308°W

Sacred Heart Church
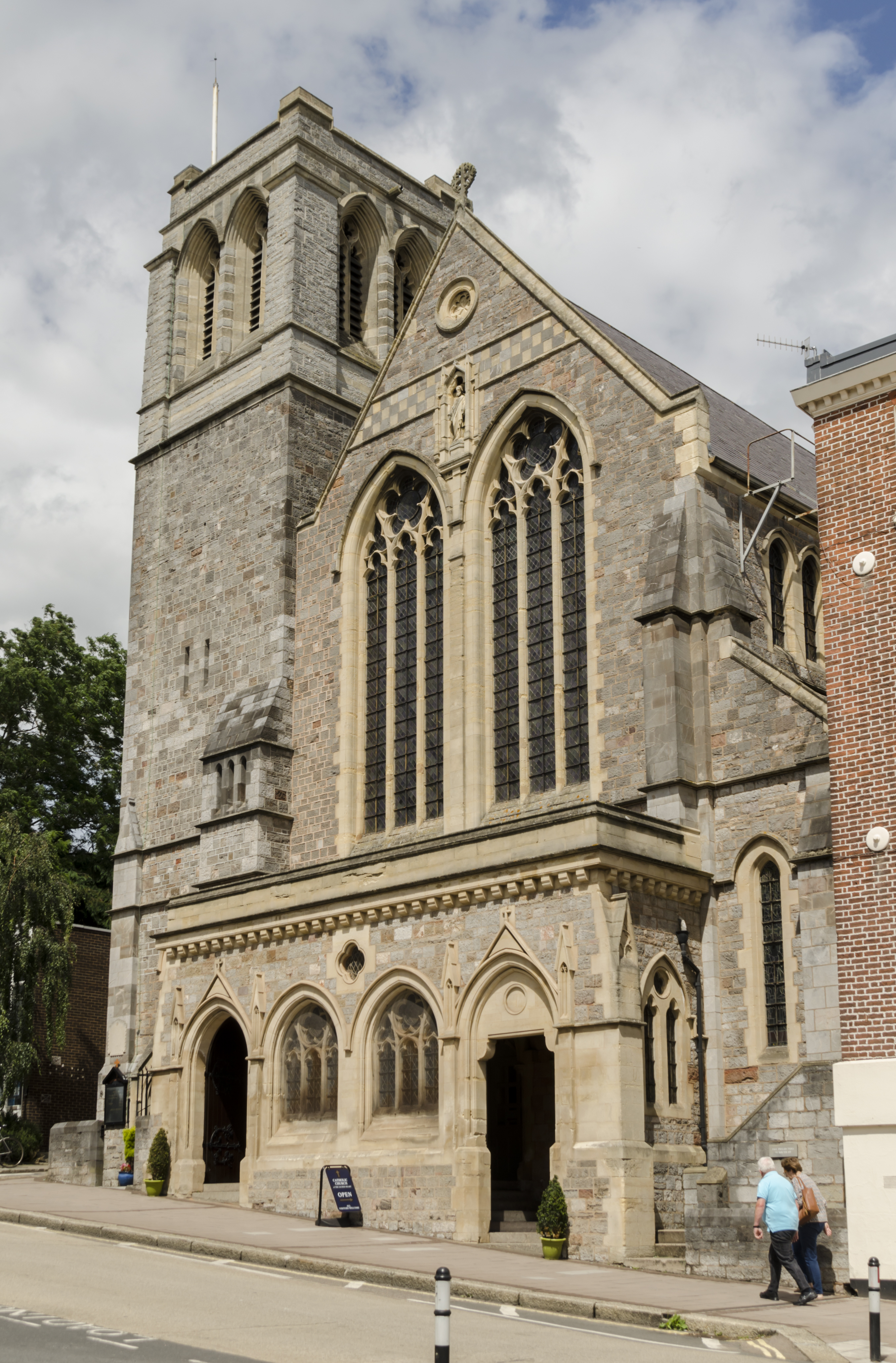

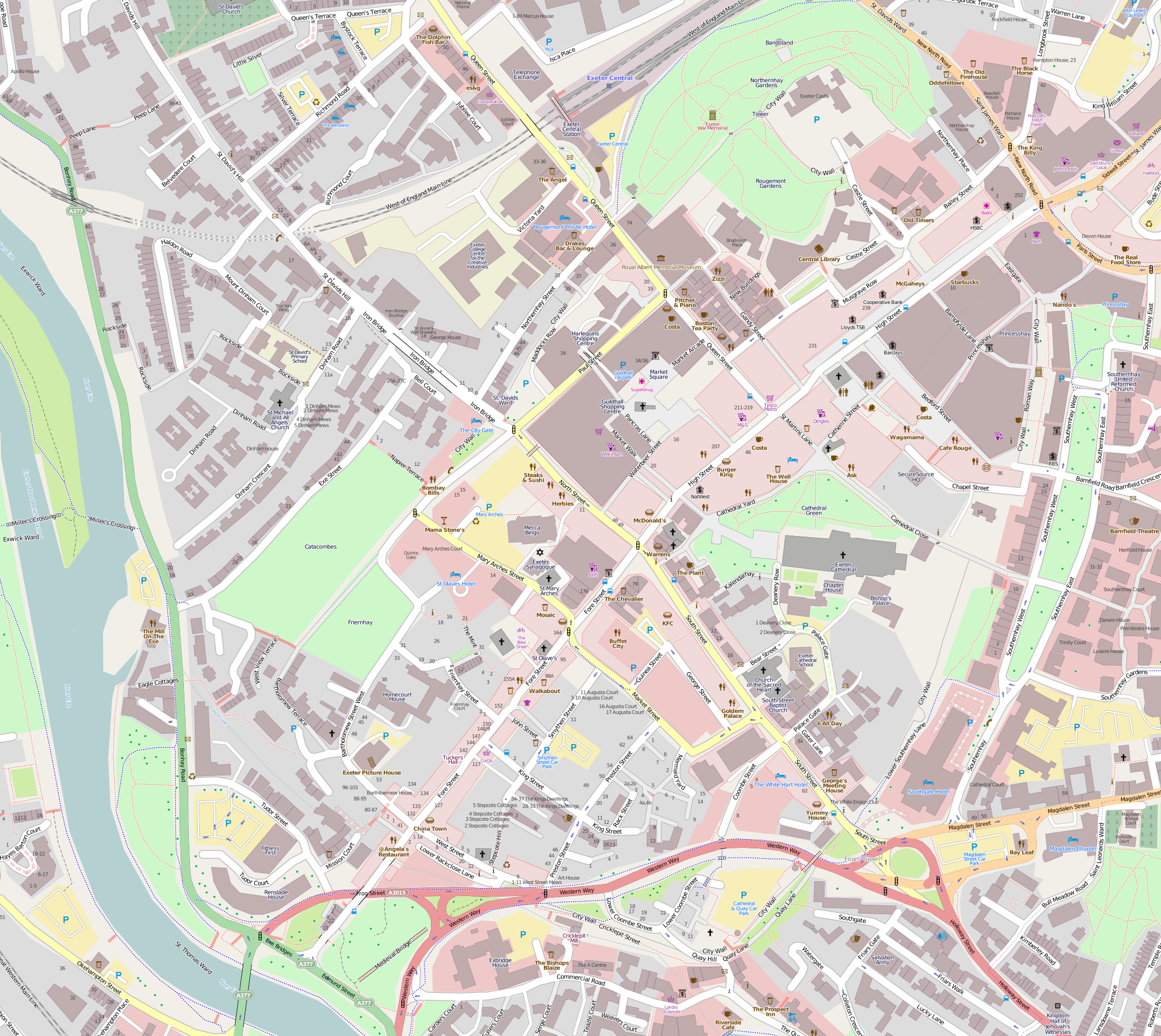
- Location in Exeter Sacred Heart Church (Devon)
- OS grid reference: SX 92034 92440
- Location: Exeter, Devon
- Country: England
- Denomination: Roman Catholic
- Website: ExeterSacredHeart.talktalk.net

History
- Status: Parish church
- Dedication: Sacred Heart

Architecture
- Functional status: Active
- Heritage designation: Grade II listed
- Designated: 18 June 1974
- Architect: Leonard Stokes
- Style: Gothic Revival
- Groundbreaking: 1883
- Completed: 18 November 1884

Administration
- Province: Southwark
- Diocese: Plymouth
- Deanery: Exeter

Sacred Heart Church is a Roman Catholic Parish church in Exeter, Devon, England. It is a part of the Roman Catholic Diocese of Plymouth. It was built from 1883 to 1884 and designed by Leonard Stokes. It is situated on the corner of South Street and Bear Street, close to Exeter Cathedral in the centre of the city. It is a Gothic Revival church and a Grade II listed building.

== History ==
=== Foundation ===
Before the church was built, Roman Catholics congregated for Mass in rooms of houses. The first post-Reformation Catholic chapel in Exeter was recorded in 1791 near the remains of St Nicholas' Priory, and this building was subsequently replaced by Sacred Heart Church.

The site of the church was previously the Bear Tavern, which before the Dissolution of the Monasteries was the town house of the abbots of Tavistock Abbey. The church also remembers the history of the Reformation. There is contained within the church a statue of St Thomas More, a martyr of the Reformation, as well as a banner of the five wounds. This is an acknowledgement of the Western Rebellion in 1549.

At the time of Catholic Emancipation in the mid-19th century, around 1% of religious attendants in the south west were Catholic.

=== Construction ===
A committee was formed in 1788 with the intention of serving Exeter's Catholic population, which was estimated at the time to be around 300 people. The local diocesan bishop oversaw the committee, and construction began as soon as enough funds were raised.

Building work on the church started in 1883. The foundation stone was laid by William Vaughan, Bishop of Plymouth. When building was completed in 1884, the Catholic community moved from the chapel near the priory.

It is the earliest surviving architectural work of Leonard Stokes. At the time, he was in a business partnership with C. E. Ware. On 18 November 1884, the church was opened. Inside, the church was made using materials such as Bath Corsham, Pocombe and Portland stone; the total construction cost approximately £10,000. In 1926, the church tower was completed. Originally designed as a pointed spire, the 140 feet (43 m) flat-top tower contains a bell of 51 kilograms (112 lb).

=== Second World War ===
South Street was hit badly during the air raids on Exeter in April 1942. Sacred Heart Church, presbytery, and the neighbouring Baptist church survived.

Part of this is credited to the priests of Sacred Heart. Parish priest Fr Thomas Barney, who passed buckets of sand and water to his curates, Fr Michael Walsh and Fr P Pedrick, who extinguished any incendiary bombs that landed on the church, presbytery and adjacent Baptist church. They remained there despite warnings from the air raid warden to evacuate. Fr Barney, parish priest, claimed afterwards to have seen the sign of the Cross within the sky on the night of the raid which almost destroyed the church.

At the end of the war, the parish celebrated with a procession along the ruined South Street.

=== Post-war period ===
Sacred Heart was re-ordered along the guidelines of the Second Vatican Council, with a wooden altar installed in 1966 to allow the priests to celebrate Mass facing the people. The church became linked to the local Catholic school, St Nicholas' Primary School.

The church retained links to the Catholic chaplaincy at Exeter University until the formation of a separate chaplaincy mission in 1965.

=== Parish priests ===
1871-1911 - Rt. Reverend Provost W Hobson

1911-1914 - Canon C Gandy

1914-1918 - Canon J Shepherd

1918-1947 - Fr Thomas Barney

1947-1967 - Rt. Reverend Provost P Tobin

1967-1981 - Canon F Balment

1981-1986 - Fr K Collins

1986-1990 - Canon B Jaffa

1990-2015 - Monsignor Harry Doyle

2015-2018 - Fr John Deeny

2018-2023 - Fr Kieran Kirby

2023- Fr Petroc Cobb

== Interior ==
The church contains a large wrought-iron rood screen, donated to the church in 1886.

The church contains statues either side of the rood screen, depicting St Sidwell, St George, St Edward the Confessor, and an unknown figure believed to be St Walburga.

The church contains a high altar in Portland stone, which no longer serves as the principal altar due to the re-ordering as a result of the Second Vatican Council. The church also contains three side altars. To the left of the main sanctuary is the Lady Chapel, and to the right sits the chapel of St Joseph. There is a third altar dedicated to the diocesan patron, St Boniface.

== Parish ==
The church has three Sunday Masses: 5:30p.m. on Saturday and 9:15a.m. and 11:15a.m. on Sunday. There is also a Polish Mass at 2:30p.m. every Sunday. During weekdays there is a 10:00a.m. Mass from Monday to Saturday, and a 7:00pm Mass on Thursday evenings.

== Exterior ==
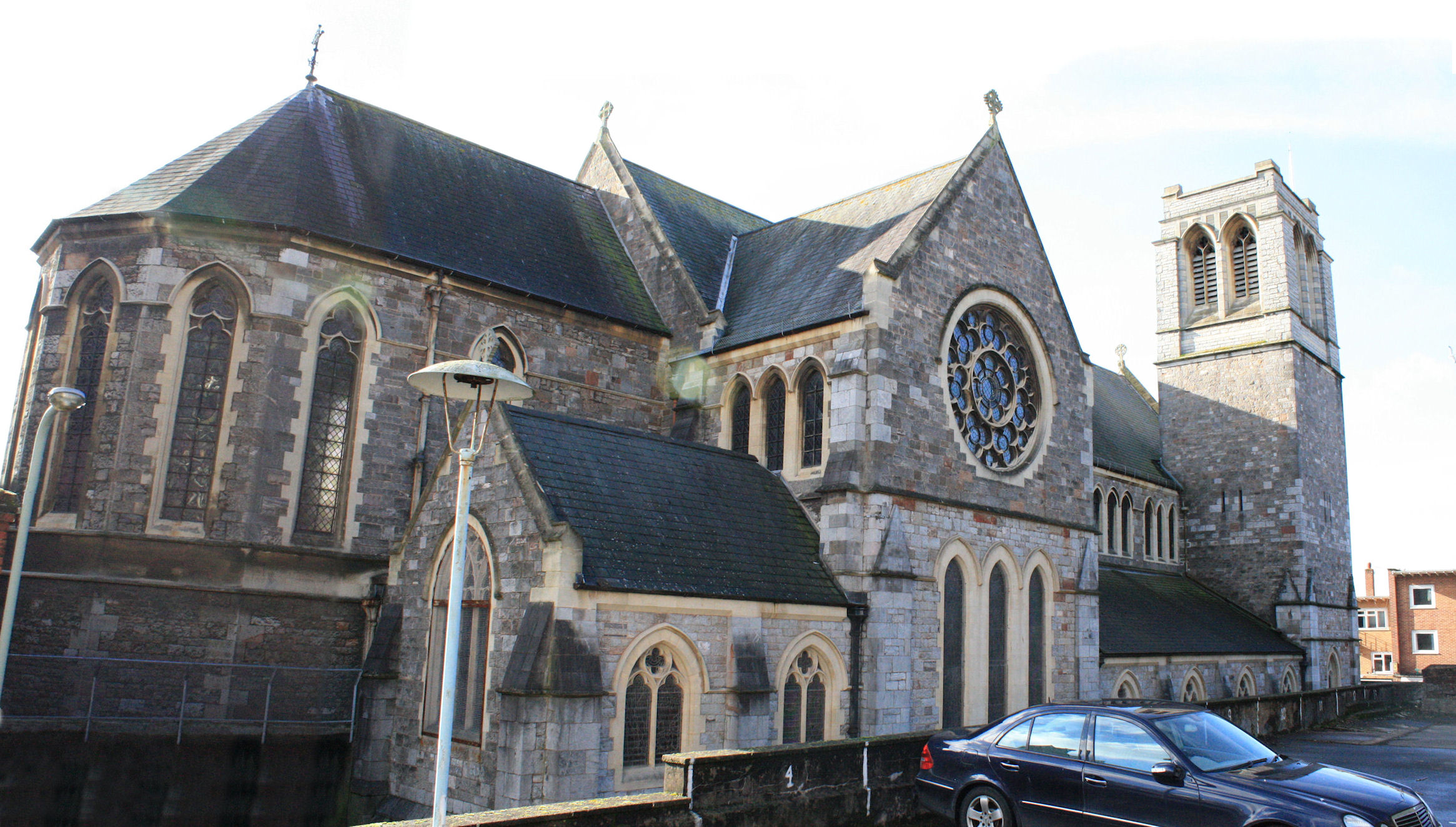
South side

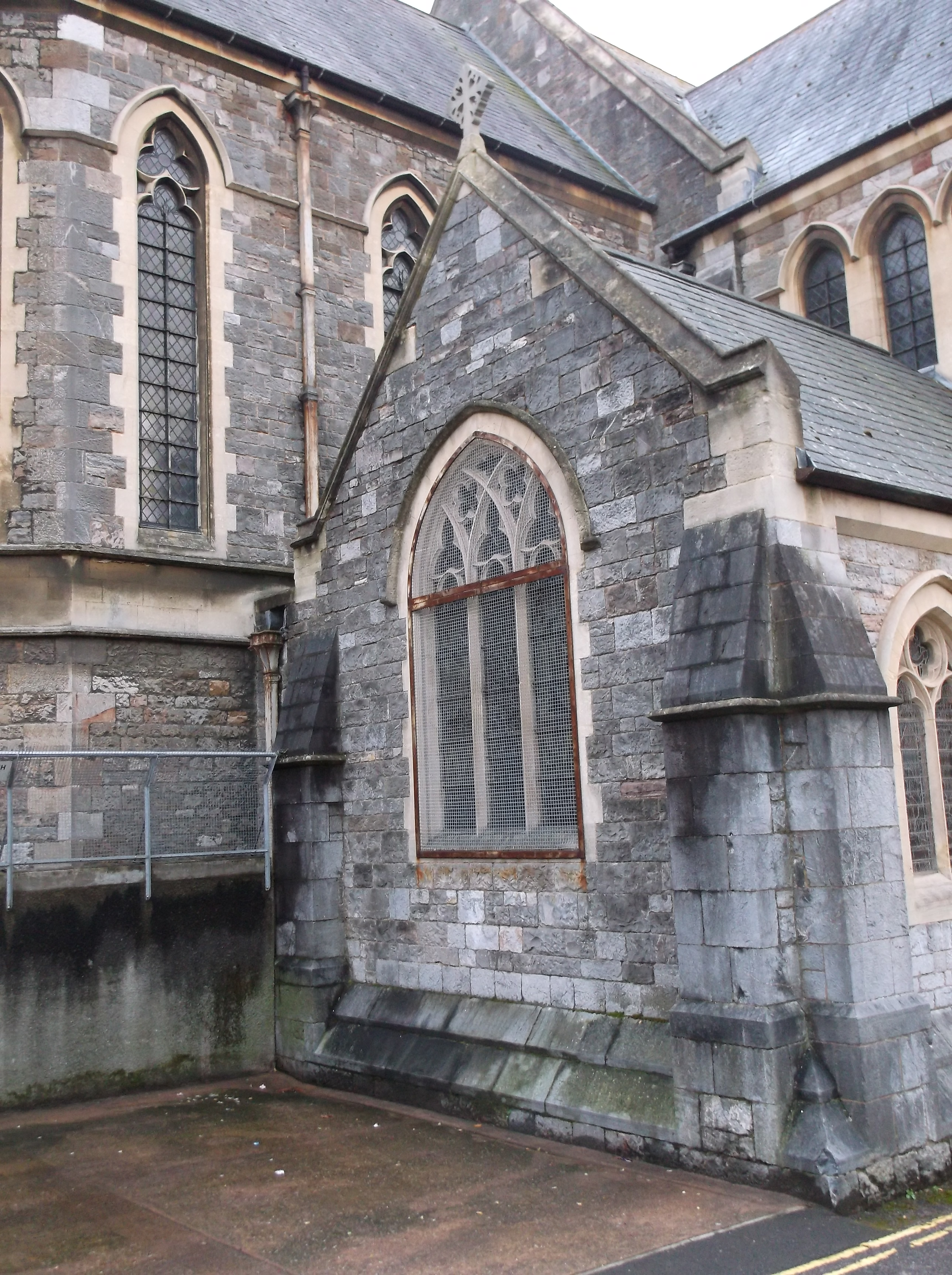
Side chapel

== See also ==
- Roman Catholic Diocese of Plymouth
