= Philip Moger =

English Catholic bishop (born 1955)

The Right Reverend Philip Moger
- Bishop Emeritus of Plymouth
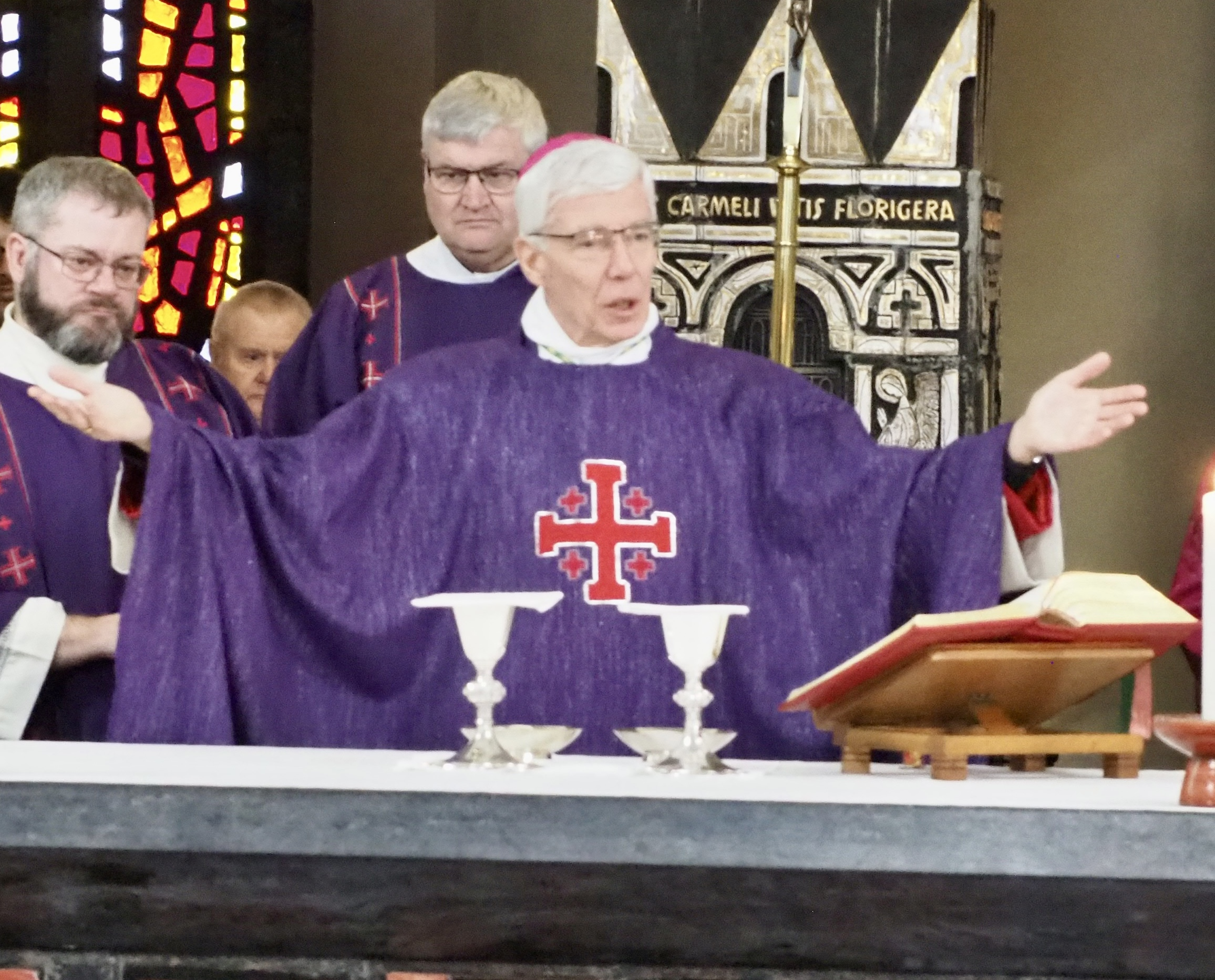
- Moger in 2024
- Church: Catholic Church
- Diocese: Plymouth
- See: Plymouth
- Appointed: 13 September 2024
- Installed: Never took possession of See
- Predecessor: Mark O'Toole
- Successor: Nicholas Hudson
- Previous posts: Rector of the Basilica of Our Lady of Walsingham (2020–2023); Dean of Leeds Cathedral (2008–2019); Auxiliary Bishop in Southwark; Titular Bishop of Glastonia

Orders
- Ordination: 26 June 1982 by Gordon Wheeler
- Consecration: 21 February 2023 by John Wilson

Personal details
- Born: 25 April 1955 (age 71) Halifax, West Riding of Yorkshire
- Education: St Cuthbert's College, Ushaw

Philip Moger (born 25 April 1955) is an English bishop of the Catholic Church and Bishop Emeritus of Plymouth. Although he never took possession of the Diocese of Plymouth, he is listed by the Vatican as bishop emeritus of the diocese, having been appointed to the position by Pope Francis on 13 September 2024. He was ordained a priest for the Diocese of Leeds and was rector of the Basilica of Our Lady of Walsingham from 2020 to 2023. He was then an auxiliary bishop in the Archdiocese of Southwark and Titular Bishop of Glastonia.

== Life and ministry ==
=== Early life ===
Phillip Moger was born in Halifax, West Yorkshire, on 25 April 1955. He was mainly raised by a grandmother after his mother died when he was five. He felt the first call to the priesthood when he was eight years old. He worked briefly for NatWest Bank before becoming a seminarian for the Diocese of Leeds and studying at St Cuthbert's College, Ushaw.

=== Priesthood ===
Moger was ordained a priest for the Diocese of Leeds at St Mary's Church, Halifax, by the then-Bishop of Leeds, Gordon Wheeler, in 1982. He had various ministries in the diocese, including as a parochial vicar, the vocations director for the diocese, and as a chaplain at a Sue Ryder home. In 2008 he was appointed a prelate of honour, a canon of the chapter of Leeds Cathedral and dean of the cathedral. Additionally, he oversaw the liturgical planning for Pope Benedict XVI's 2010 visit to the United Kingdom. In 2020, he became the rector of the Basilica of Our Lady of Walsingham in Little Walsingham, Norfolk.

He was also named the first Catholic honorary canon of the Church of England's Ripon Cathedral by Bishop John Packer in 2008, as well as being the Catholic observer on the Church of England's liturgical commission.

=== Episcopacy ===
==== Auxiliary Bishop of Southwark ====
In November 2022 Pope Francis appointed Moger an auxiliary bishop of the Archdiocese of Southwark, with the titular see of Glastonia. He was consecrated a bishop at St George's Cathedral, Southwark, on 21 February 2023 by Archbishop John Wilson with Bishop Marcus Stock and Bishop Paul Hendricks as principal co-consecrators.

==== Bishop of Plymouth ====
On 13 September 2024 it was announced that Pope Francis had appointed Moger as bishop of the Diocese of Plymouth. Commenting on his appointment, he said, "I'm very honoured to be asked by Pope Francis to be the tenth Bishop of this great Diocese of Plymouth… I look forward to visiting and getting to know the clergy, religious and lay faithful in this beautiful part of the Lord’s vineyard."

Moger was due to be installed as bishop on 9 November 2024 at the Cathedral Church of St Mary and St Boniface, Plymouth. On 6 November, however, Moger issued an apology stating he intended to postpone his installation until termination of an investigation of personal issues. Mentions of due process in his statement raised the question of whether Moger was subject to a canonical inquiry.

In February 2025, Pope Francis accepted Moger's request to step down from his appointment as bishop of the Diocese of Plymouth. He stated that he would be taking a sabbatical, although the statement did not make clear whether he might return as an auxiliary in Southwark, nor was any comment made on the Vatican's official Bollettino of appointments and resignations.
