= British Catholic History =

- Discipline: Biography, church history
- Language: English
- Edited by: Katy Gibbons

Publication details
- Former name(s): Biographical Studies of English Catholics, Recusant History
- History: 1951-present
- Publisher: Cambridge University Press on behalf of the Catholic Record Society (United Kingdom)
- Frequency: Biannual

Standard abbreviations
- ISO 4: Br. Cathol. Hist.

Indexing
- ISSN: 0034-1932 (print); 2055-7981 (web)
- LCCN: 65001062
- OCLC no.: 1624181

Links
- Journal homepage; Online access; Online archive

British Catholic History is a biannual peer-reviewed academic journal published by Cambridge University Press on behalf of the Catholic Record Society. In its early years it was known as Biographical Studies of English Catholics, and from 1959 to 2015 as Recusant History.

The journal covers the study of the Roman Catholic Church in the British Isles. The editor-in-chief is Katy Gibbons (University of Portsmouth).

== History ==
The journal was established in 1951 under the title Biographical Studies of English Catholics, under the editorship of A. F. Allison (British Library) and D. M. Rogers (Bodleian Library). With volume 5 (1959) the title was changed to Recusant History: A Journal of Research in Post-Reformation Catholic History in the British Isles, a reference to recusancy as a defining characteristic of early modern English Catholicism and a move away from the more strictly biographical focus of the early issues. It obtained its current title in 2015 with the switch to Cambridge University Press.
