= Charles Graham (bishop) =

British clergyman

The Right Reverend Charles Graham
- Bishop emeritus of Plymouth
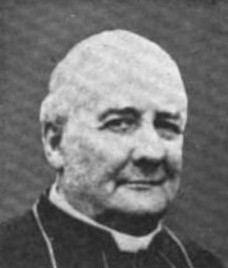
- Province: Southwark
- Diocese: Plymouth
- Installed: 25 October 1902
- Term ended: 16 March 1911
- Predecessor: William Vaughan
- Successor: John Joseph Keily

Orders
- Ordination: 27 February 1926 (Priest)
- Consecration: 25 July 1947 (Bishop)

Personal details
- Born: 5 April 1834 Mhow, India
- Died: 2 September 1912 (aged 78) Hayle, England
- Denomination: Roman Catholic

Charles Maurice Graham (5 April 1834 – 2 September 1912) was a British clergyman who held high office in the Roman Catholic Church.

== Life ==
Graham was born 5 April 1834 at Mhow, India. He was educated at Sacred Heart College at Prior Park and the English College, Rome. He was ordained in 1857, and two years later became secretary to the bishop and treasurer of the Diocese of Plymouth.

He was appointed Coadjutor Bishop of Plymouth and Titular Bishop of Cisamus on 25 September 1891, and succeeded as diocesan Bishop of Plymouth on 25 October 1902. He retired on 16 March 1911 and took the title Bishop of Tiberias in partibus. He died in Hayle, Cornwall on 2 September 1912.

Bishop Graham wrote the article on the "Diocese of Plymouth" for the Catholic Encyclopedia.
