= Leonard Stokes =

English architect and artist

Leonard Aloysius Scott Stokes (1858 – 25 December 1925) was an English architect and artist.

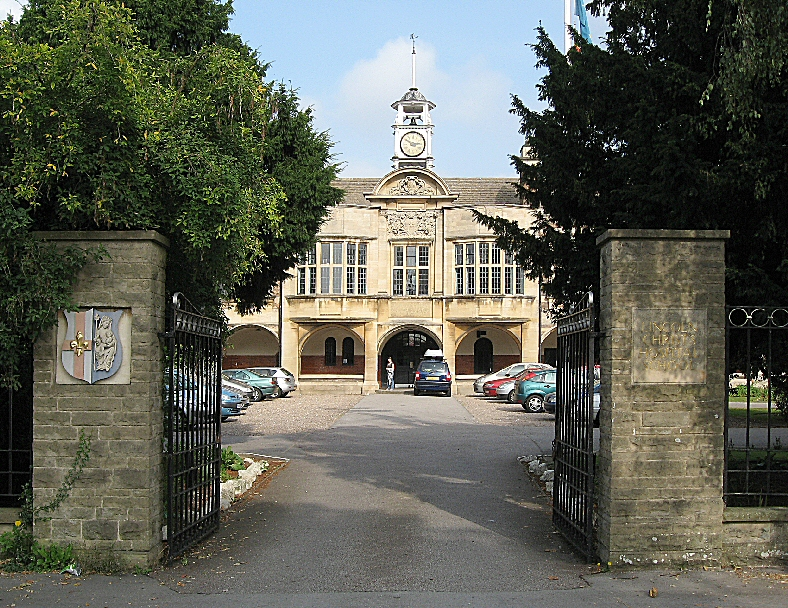
Lincoln Christ’s Hospital School, Lincoln, designed by Leonard Stokes in 1905

Leonard Stokes was born in Southport (then in Lancashire) in 1858 the son of Scott Nasmyth Stokes, a school inspector. He trained in London and travelled in Germany and Italy. Most of his designs were for Roman Catholic buildings, including churches, convents and schools. His first work was Sacred Heart Church, Exeter. He also designed St Joseph's Church, Maidenhead, in 1884, and the Church of St Clare, Liverpool, in 1890 and St Peter and All Souls Church, Peterborough, in 1896. He also designed country houses and around 20 telephone exchanges. In 1919 he was awarded the Royal Gold Medal of the Royal Institute of British Architects, having served as their president from 1910 to 1912. Sir Albert Edward Richardson, who later became president of the Royal Society, trained in his offices.

His brother Wilfred Stokes was an engineer and inventor. His nephew Richard Stokes was a Labour MP and minister.

On 26 April 1898, he married Edith Neillie Gale Gaine in Leamington Spa.

He died in 1925 in Chelsea, London and is buried at St Mary Magdalen Roman Catholic Church, Mortlake.
