= Catholic Record Society =

Scholarly society in England and Wales

- Abbreviation: CRS
- Formation: 1904
- Type: Learned society
- Registration no.: 313529
- Legal status: Charity
- Purpose: The study of the Roman Catholic history of England and Wales since the Reformation, including the publication of relevant records
- Region served: Worldwide
- President: Nicholas Hudson, Auxiliary Bishop in the Archdiocese of Westminster
- Chair of Council: Dr Susan O'Brien
- Hon. Secretary: Dr Scholastica Jacob
- Website: https://www.crs.org.uk/

The Catholic Record Society (Registered Charity No. 313529) is a scholarly society devoted to the study of peri- and post-Reformational Catholic Church in England and Wales founded in 1904. It has been described as "the premier Catholic historical society in the United Kingdom", and has been credited with making much otherwise obscure archival material more readily available.

== History ==
The society was initially established in 1904 as a text publication society, with the aim of publishing Catholic historical records. Active members in its early years included Joseph Gillow, J. H. Pollen, and Joseph S. Hansom. The Society continues as a membership organisation with UK and international members.

== Publications ==
The Society continues to issue volumes of source material relating to Catholic history in the CRS Records Series; and a separate series of monographs, CRS Monographs. Both series are published on the Society's behalf by Boydell & Brewer. The Society has made its historic publications of source material available in digital format on its website which is being developed as a resource for anyone interested in Catholic history. More recent volumes are available in a variety of formats via the publisher.

It also publishes a journal, which was originally titled Biographical Studies, 1534–1829 (volumes 1–3, 1951–56); then Recusant History (volumes 4–31, 1957–2014); but which since volume 32 (2015) has been known as British Catholic History, and is published by Cambridge University Press.

== Conferences ==
A residential three-day conference is organised each year, at which the Society's AGM takes place. For many years these events took place at Plater College, Oxford. Since the closure of Plater College, the conference has been held in Liverpool, Cambridge, York and Leeds.
