= St Marychurch Town Hall =

Municipal building in St Marychurch, Devon, England

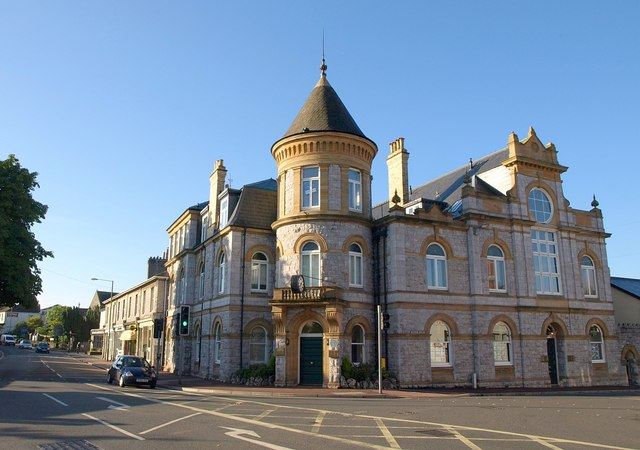
- St Marychurch Town Hall

- Shown in Devon
- 50.4811°N 3.5214°W
- Location: Fore Street, St Marychurch

History
- Built: 1883

Site notes
- Architect: George Bridgman
- Architectural style: Italianate style

Listed Building – Grade II
- Official name: Town Hall, St Marychurch
- Designated: 3 May 1994
- Reference no.: 1208816

St Marychurch Town Hall is a municipal building in Fore Street, St Marychurch, Devon, England. The town hall, which is now used as a block of apartments, is a Grade II listed building.

== History ==
The building was commissioned by the local board of health, which had previously met at the Dolphin Inn. A design completion was held and won by George Bridgman who received a prize of £25. The new building was designed in the Italianate style, built by a local builder, Alfred Harris, in rough limestone at a cost of £2,718 and was officially opened in November 1883.

The design featured a symmetrical three-stage circular tower on the corner of Fore Street and Manor Road: there was a doorway with a fanlight and an archivolt flanked by brackets supporting a balustraded balcony in the first stage, a French door flanked by smaller round headed windows in the second stage and three windows flanked by pilasters in the third stage with a modillioned cornice and a conical roof above. The Manor Street frontage of four bays involved, in the three right hand bays, a central rounded headed doorway with an archivolt flanked by round headed windows on the ground floor and a rectangular three-light window flanked by round headed windows on the first floor. The gable above, which contained a large oculus, was flanked by balustrades surmounted by finials. There was a four bay section in Fore Street which was fenestrated with round headed windows with archivolts on the ground and first floors and with dormer windows on the second floor. Internally, the principal rooms were the council chamber, a meeting room on the ground floor and a large assembly room on the first floor.

The town hall was the venue for the coroner's inquest in November 1884 into the death of Emma Keyse. A servant, John Lee, was subsequently tried, found guilty and, due to failure of the faulty trap door to open, hanged three times for her murder. His sentence was subsequently commuted to life in prison.

Following significant population growth, largely associated with the role of St Marychurch as a seaside town, the area became an urban district with the town hall as its headquarters in 1894; however, the new council was short-lived as the area was annexed by Torbay in 1900. The town hall was subsequently used as an events venue with concerts, dances, film shows and whist drives. In January 1914, the town hall was the venue for a debate by the local branch of the National Union of Women's Suffrage Societies at which Maud Palmer, Countess of Selborne was one of the speakers. Then in 1917, during the First World War, the town hall was used as a restaurant for Australian and New Zealand Army Corps troops who had returned from service on the Western Front and were billeted at a local private house known as Hampton Court.

During the Second World War, the building was used by the public health department of the local council and, in 1947, Stella Isaacs, Marchioness of Reading unveiled a new projecting clock, which had been donated by the Women's Voluntary Service of which she was the founder and chairman. The building was later used by the weights and measures department of the local council before falling into a state of disrepair. Faced with significant costs for refurbishment of the building, Torbay Council decided to sell it to a developer for £500,000 in 2005; the proceeds applied for works on the Babbacombe Cliff Railway and the town hall was subsequently converted into apartments.
