= St Joseph's Church, Maidenhead =

St Joseph's Church
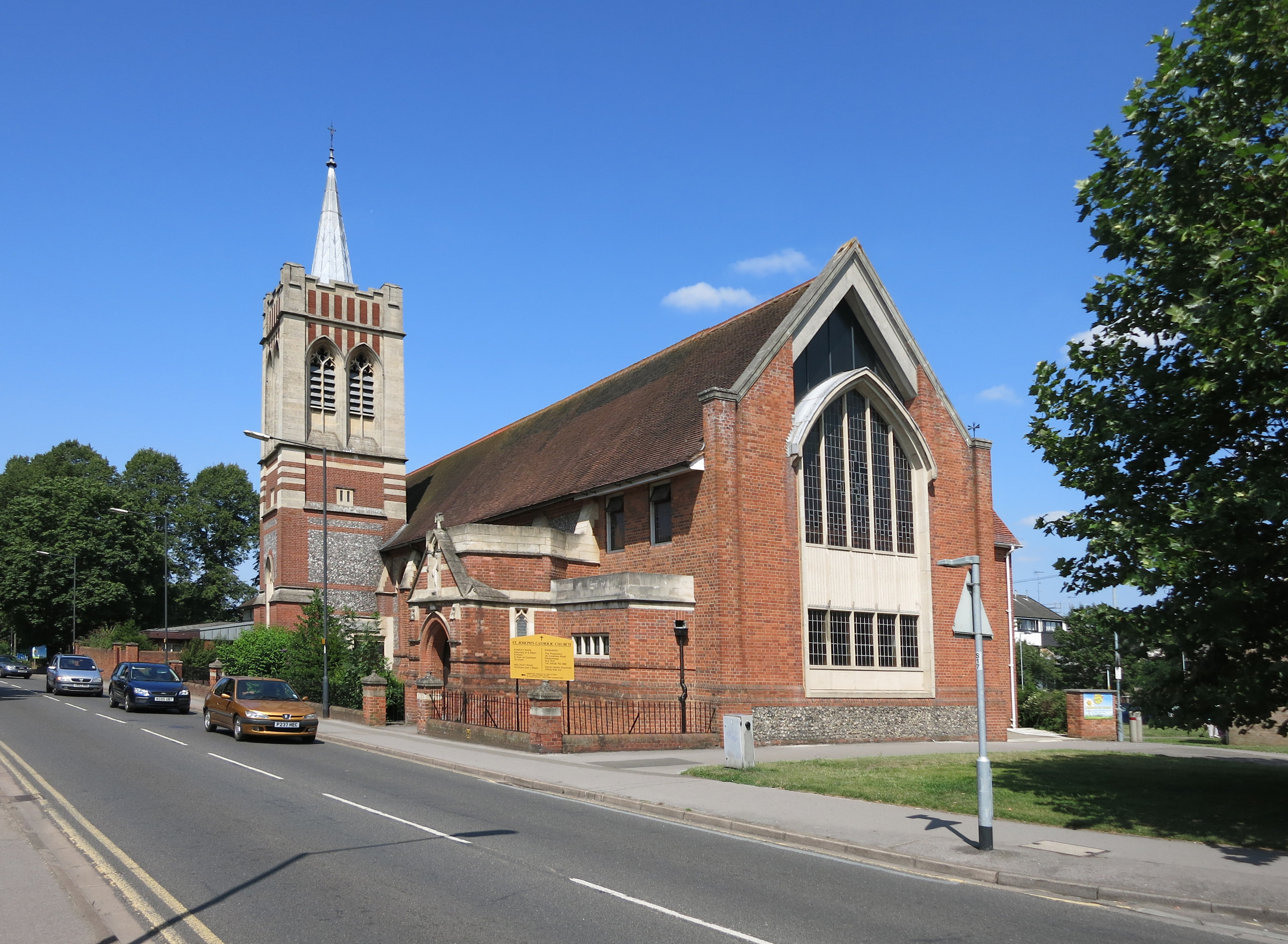
- St Joseph's Church
- 51.5269°N 0.7206°W
- Location: Maidenhead
- Country: England
- Denomination: Roman Catholic
- Website: StJosephsParish.co.uk

History
- Status: Parish church
- Founded: 1867
- Dedication: Saint Joseph
- Events: Extended 1913-14

Architecture
- Functional status: Active
- Heritage designation: Grade II listed
- Designated: 12 August 1983
- Architect: Leonard Stokes
- Style: Gothic Revival
- Groundbreaking: August 1884
- Completed: December 1884
- Construction cost: £3,018

Administration
- Province: Southwark
- Diocese: Portsmouth
- Deanery: Bl. Dominic Barberi
- Parish: St Joseph

St Joseph's Church is a Roman Catholic parish church in Maidenhead, Berkshire, England. It was built in 1884 and designed by Leonard Stokes in the Gothic Revival style. It is located on the Cookham Road north of the town centre. It is a Grade II listed building and William Wilberforce junior played a role in its foundation.

== History ==
=== Construction ===
In 1850, William Wilberforce junior, the son of William Wilberforce, converted to Catholicism. In 1867, he established a mission in Maidenhead by installing a chapel in a property at St Ives Place. In 1871, a Catholic school began in the area. In 1879, the site for the current church was bought. The architect Leonard Stokes was commissioned to design the church. In August 1884, construction on the church started. The total cost of building the church, school and presbytery was £6,025 and the church itself was £3,018. In December 1884, the church was opened.

=== Developments ===
From 1913 to 1914, the church was extended. The sanctuary, sacristy, transepts and the church tower were added. Leonard Stokes designed the additions, but to new designs. In 1963, plans were made to further extend the church. In 1965, construction of the extension to the west of the church was completed. The architect was Max G. Cross of the architectural firm Geens Cross & Sims from Bournemouth and the builders were Halfacre & Young. In 1985, the old presbytery was replaced by a new house and the parish centre was opened. The parish centre was designed by Daniel Lelliott Krauze. From 2004 to 2006, repairs were made to the church.

== Parish ==
St Joseph's Church is a parish with St Elizabeth's Church in Cookham. There are four Sunday Masses at St Joseph's Church at 6:30pm on Saturday and at 8:00am, 9:15am and 11:00am on Sunday.

== See also ==
- Roman Catholic Diocese of Portsmouth
