= Joseph Stanislaus Hansom =

British architect (1845–1931)

- Born: 1845; York
- Died: 1931; London
- Occupation: Architect
- Buildings: Oxford Oratory, Church of the Holy Name of Jesus, Manchester (as "Joseph A. Hansom & Son")

Joseph Stanislaus Hansom FRIBA (1845–1931) was a British architect. He was the son and partner of the better-known Joseph Aloysius Hansom, inventor of the Hansom cab. He trained with his father, becoming his partner in 1869, and taking over the family practice fully in 1880.

In 1881, he inherited the practice of John Aloysius Crawley (1834 –-1881). In 1881, he designed Our Lady of Sorrows Church in Bognor Regis and extended St Mary Immaculate Church, Falmouth.

He was among the founders, in 1904, of the Catholic Record Society, and was so active on its behalf that the former Archivist of the Holy Roman Church, Cardinal Francis Aidan Gasquet described him as "its prime mover and energy."
