= John Keily =

Irish prelate

The Right Reverend John Keily
- Bishop of Plymouth
- Province: Southwark
- Diocese: Plymouth
- Installed: 21 April 1911
- Term ended: 23 September 1928
- Predecessor: Charles Maurice Graham
- Successor: John Patrick Barrett

Orders
- Ordination: 6 May 1877
- Consecration: 13 June 1911

Personal details
- Born: 23 June 1854
- Died: 23 September 1928 (aged 74)
- Denomination: Roman Catholic

John Joseph Keily (1854–1928) was an Irish prelate of the Roman Catholic Church.

The son of Bartholomew and Margaret Keily, he was born on 23 June 1854 in Limerick, Ireland. He was ordained a priest on 6 May 1877 before being elevated to the episcopate as Bishop of Plymouth on 21 April 1911, a post he held until his death on 23 September 1928; at the age of 74. He was buried at St Augustine's Priory Cemetery, Plymouth. On 13 December 1998 he was re-interred in the Lady Chapel vault at Plymouth Cathedral.

St Boniface's Catholic College in Plymouth has a House named after him.

== See also ==
- St Boniface's Catholic College, Plymouth

== Notes ==
Catholic Church titles
Preceded by Charles Maurice Graham	Bishop of Plymouth; 1911–1928	Succeeded by John Patrick Barrett
