= John Barrett (bishop) =

British clergyman

The Right Reverend John Patrick Barrett
- Bishop of Plymouth
- Church: Latin Church
- Province: Southwark
- Diocese: Plymouth
- Installed: 7 June 1929
- Term ended: 2 November 1946
- Predecessor: John Keily
- Successor: Francis Grimshaw

Orders
- Ordination: 19 June 1906
- Consecration: 22 February 1927

Personal details
- Born: 31 October 1878
- Died: 2 November 1946 (aged 68)
- Denomination: Roman Catholic

John Patrick Barrett (31 October 1878 – 2 November 1946) was a British prelate who served as Bishop of Plymouth from 1929 to 1946.

He was born on 31 October 1878 in Liverpool, England. He was educated at St Edward's College, Everton, and at the University of London (he gained his Bachelor of Arts (BA) there, a Doctor of Philosophy (PhD) later, and a Doctor of Divinity (DD) from the Pontifical Gregorian University). He was ordained a priest on 19 June 1906 at Upholland, Skelmersdale, for the Archdiocese of Liverpool. After a period as a priest, he was elevated to the episcopacy as Auxiliary Bishop of Birmingham in 1927 and was appointed the fifth Bishop of Plymouth on 7 June 1929; he was enthroned on 31 July and continued in the post until his death. When his house was destroyed in an air raid in 1941, during the Second World War, he moved into a nearby convent, where he died suddenly but peacefully on 2 November 1946.

During Barrett's time as bishop, several new places of worship were established. At Ottery, two female converts set up a chapel at Raleigh House, which later became St Anthony's Church. The Marist Sisters set up a convent in the town in 1940, which continued until 2007. The foundation stone of the Church of the Blessed Sacrament at Heavitree was laid by Barrett in 1931. The Church of Our Lady of Lourdes in Plympton was designed by Leonard Drysdale and built in memory of Barrett's predecessor, John Keily, and was consecrated in 1934.

St Boniface's Catholic College in Plymouth has a house named for him.
