= Church of St Mary and St Petroc, Bodmin =

Roman Catholic church in Cornwall, England

Coordinates: 50.4692°N 4.7155°W

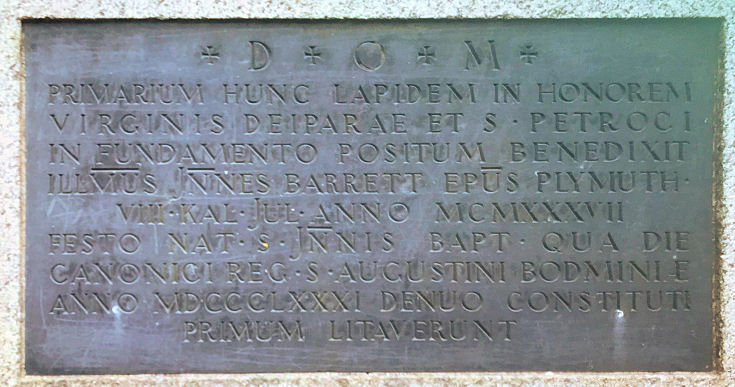
Stone commemorating the arrival of the Canons Regular in 1881

The Parish Church of St Mary and St Petroc is a congregation of the Roman Catholic Church in Bodmin, Cornwall, England, United Kingdom. The parish church is the former monastic church of the Abbey of St Mary, a community of canons regular, whose origins on the site date back to the Middle Ages.

== History ==
The village of Bodmin (which means "home of monks" in Cornish). A medieval Life of St Petroc describes how it was home to a hermit, St Goran (or Wron), during the early 6th century. In 518 he welcomed the Irish monk, St Petroc, who was seeking to found a monastery in the area, which he did near Padstow. The destruction caused to the monastery in 981 by Viking raiders caused the monks to move their community to Bodmin.

=== The abbey ===
The Priory of St Mary was established by the Canons Regular of the Lateran during the 12th century. It grew to become the largest monastic community in Cornwall, but was suppressed on 27 February 1538 in the course of the Dissolution of the Monasteries. The buildings of the priory were torn down, with the exception of the priory church, which was converted to the use of the Church of England.

The open practice of the Catholic faith in the town did not become possible again until a Catholic priest, William Young, bought some property in the town and had a Catholic church, with adjoining rectory, built in 1845. The availability of services, however, remained occasional and infrequent until 1881, when the Lateran canons were allowed to return to the region, their first modern foundation in the United Kingdom after the Dissolution, under the authority of the Bishop of Plymouth, William Vaughan.

A small community of the Order was then sent from Italy and re-established the priory under the leadership of Dom Felix Menchini, C.R.L., accompanied by Dom Jean Giraud, C.R.L., and Brother Giovanni Baptista Pastorelli. By 1884, the new community had grown to 20 members, and Menchini was officially constituted as prior and Novice Master of St. Mary's Priory, Bodmin, as well as Missionary Vicar of the diocese in charge of the Bodmin and Truro missions.

As their numbers and presence continued to expand, the canons took a major role in serving the surviving Catholic population of Cornwall. The community grew, until the house was raised to the status of an abbey in 1953. Construction on a new church to serve the canons and the town had been begun in 1937, but had to be suspended due to World War II and was not completed until 1965. It was built next to the already existing seminary of the English province of the Order.

=== The parish ===
When the canons had to close the abbey in 1976, due to dwindling numbers, they gave over the abbey to the Diocese of Plymouth and the complex was made part of the Roman Catholic Parish of St Mary and St Petroc, which covers a large area of North Cornwall. The parish includes churches in Wadebridge, Padstow and Tintagel. The abbatial cloister was converted into private housing.
