= St Paul's Church, Tintagel =

Coordinates: 50.663122°N 4.742489°W

- St Paul's Church in winter
- St Paul's Church, Tintagel
- Denomination: Roman Catholic
- Website: http://www.plymouth-diocese.org.uk/index.php?q=dir/parishes/cornwall/tintagel

History
- Dedication: St Paul the Apostle

Administration
- Province: Southwark
- Diocese: Plymouth
- Deanery: Cornwall
- Parish: Bodmin

Clergy
- Priest: Rev Ciaran McGuiness M.Afr.

The Catholic Church of St Paul the Apostle, in Bossiney Road, Tintagel, Cornwall, England, UK, was built in 1967 and consecrated by the Bishop of Plymouth, Cyril Restieaux, in February 1968. It was originally a mission administered by the Canons Regular of the Lateran based in Bodmin, services being held in the Social Hall, Trevena. It is now administered as part of the Plymouth Diocese and is part of the Parish of Bodmin which consists of churches in Bodmin, Wadebridge, Padstow and Tintagel. Fr. Bryan Storey was priest from 1973 until his death 26 July 2018. He was priest in charge for 45 years.

== Works of art ==
A thirty-thousand piece mosaic of St Paul regaining his eyesight was made for the church by Swiss artist Hanspeter Steiner.

Since January 2008 when the church celebrated its 40th anniversary, a modern version of Leonardo da Vinci's "Last Supper" by local artist Nicholas St John Rosse has hung above the main altar in the church. It was reported internationally due to its use of modern villagers as the apostles.

The statue of the Blessed Virgin was carved from serpentine stone from Cornwall, and the stained glass windows made by the monks of Buckfast Abbey.

== Memorial book ==
People come to Tintagel from all over the world to view the names of their babies lost due to miscarriage, stillbirth or other cause. The names are recorded in the Miscarriage & Infant Loss Memorial Book, a prayer request book closed in 2011, which is kept at the church.

== Gallery ==
30,000 piece mosaic of St Paul regaining his eyesight

The Last Supper by local artist, Nicholas St John Rosse

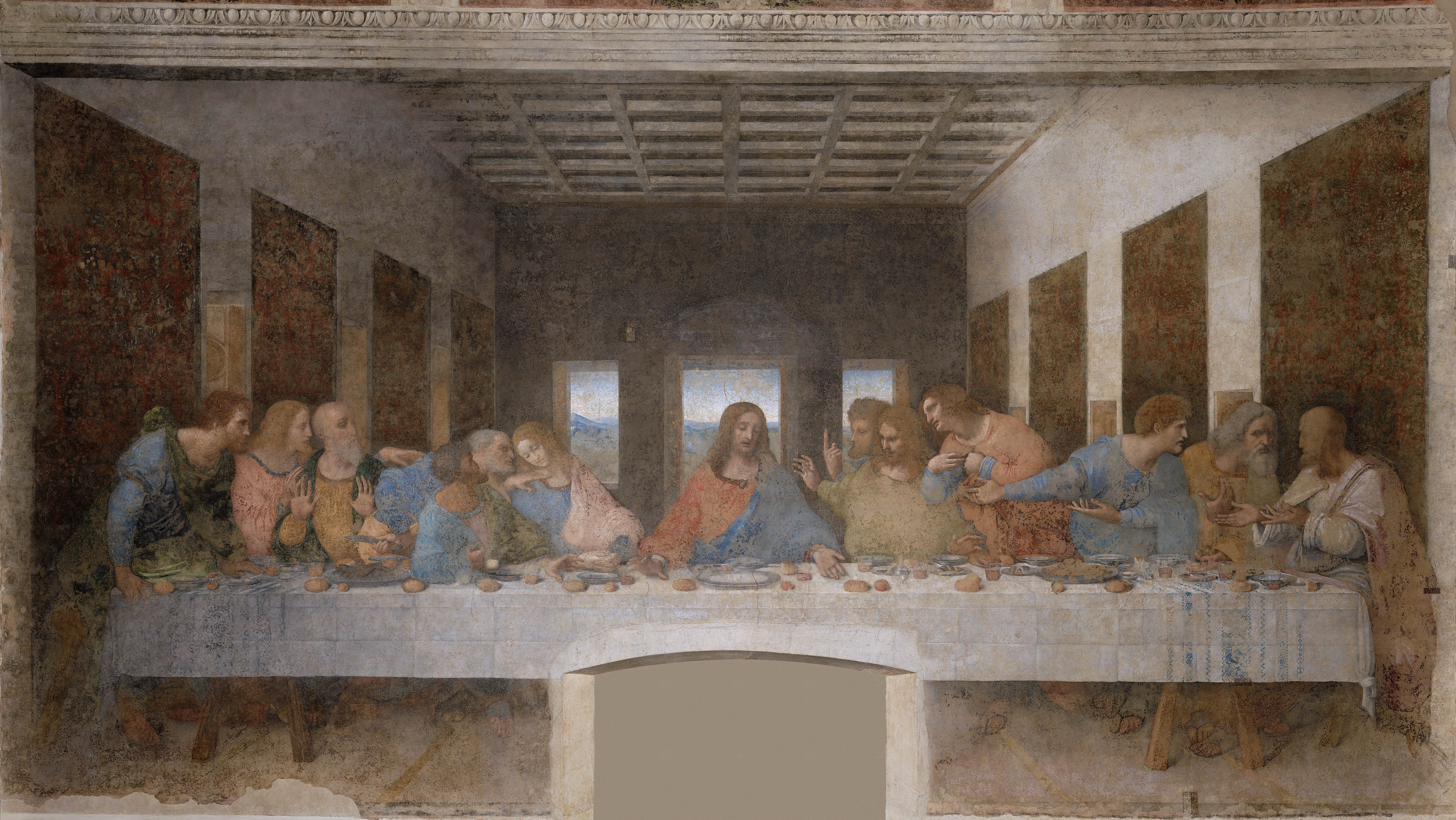
The Last Supper (1498) — Convent of Sta. Maria delle Grazie, Milan, Italy
