= St Mawgan Monastery =

Site of a monastery in Cornwall, England

Coordinates: 50.4544°N 5.0000°W

St Mawgan Monastery was a monastery at St Mawgan in Cornwall, UK, originally of Celtic monks and after the Norman Conquest of Cluniac monks.

== History ==
A Celtic monastery was established in the 6th century. It was dissolved in the 11th century. The monastery became the Manor of Lanherne by 1086 as recorded in the Domesday Book. It then became a manor house for the Arundell family and by 1360 it was their main residence.

In 1794 the estate was given for use as a convent for English Carmelite nuns from Antwerp, fleeing the French Revolution. The entrance to the convent is Elizabethan. The house had been empty for some time, and had been used by smugglers to store goods. The convent was dedicated to St Joseph and St Anne. In the Summer of 2001 the nuns of the Carmel of Lanherne relocated to amalgamate with the Carmel of St Helen in Eccleston. In 2015 the St Helens Carmel closed because of the “age and ill health” of the community and the shortage of vocations. The members of the community dispersed to other monasteries. Until about 2014 the Convent housed a relic, the skull of the martyr Cuthbert Mayne. This relic was transferred to the National Shrine of St Cuthbert Mayne in Launceston.

The enclosed Franciscan Sisters of the Immaculate took up occupancy in 2001. As of 2010, the Franciscan Sisters of the Immaculate at Lanherne Convent were still at the site. By 2015, the Convent found itself again host to those living according to the Carmelite rule and has continued to thrive to this day in 2025.
