= Sclerder Abbey =

Abbey in Lansallos, Polperro, England

Coordinates: 50.347987°N 4.505089°W

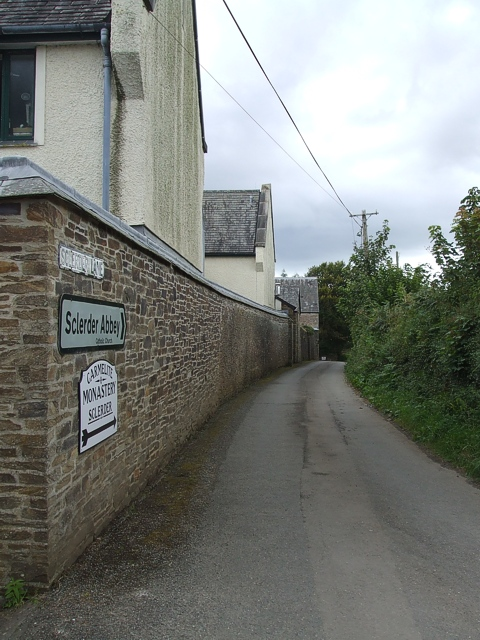
Sclerder, near Polperro, Cornwall

Sclerder Abbey (pronounced: Sklerder Abby; Cornish: Abatty Clerder, meaning Abbey of Clarity) is a former Carmelite monastery in Cornwall, England, UK, located between Looe and Polperro, which accommodates a Roman Catholic Community with an ecumenical vocation, which grew out of a prayer group in Lyon, France, in 1973. It currently has around 2000 members in over 30 countries.

The Abbey was founded in 1843 by the Dames de la Retraite who left in 1852, and was then occupied successively by the Franciscan Recollects (1858–1864); Carmelite nuns (1864–1871); Sisters of the Sacred Hearts of Jesus and Mary (1904–1910); Minoresses from Rennes (1914–1920); Minoresses from Bullingham (1922–1981), including Franciscan nuns (from c. 1925). Carmelite nuns from Quidenham resided at Sclerder Abbey from 1981 until 2014. In September 2014, Chemin Neuf an ecumenical Christian community, moved to Sclerder when Bishop Mark O’Toole (RC Bishop of Plymouth) celebrated a Mass of Thanksgiving for the life of prayer and service of the Carmelite community and welcomed the new community of Chemin Neuf.

The new community of Chemin Neuf are gradually renovating the abbey. It is a Grade II listed building and has a very beautiful garden. The community put on a regular programme of retreats and events for both groups and individuals.

Sclerder Abbey serves the Cornish Roman Catholic community. Mass is celebrated on Saturdays, Sundays and Wednesdays in the church at 9.00 am.

== See also ==
- Community of the Chemin Neuf
- List of monastic houses in Cornwall
