= Cyril Restieaux =

The Right Reverend Cyril Edward Restieaux
- Bishop Emeritus of Plymouth
- Province: Southwark
- Diocese: Plymouth
- Installed: 9 April 1955
- Term ended: 19 November 1985
- Predecessor: Francis Joseph Grimshaw
- Successor: Hugh Christopher Budd

Orders
- Ordination: 1 November 1932
- Consecration: 14 June 1955

Personal details
- Born: 25 February 1910
- Died: 27 February 1996 (aged 86)
- Denomination: Roman Catholic

Cyril Edward Restieaux (25 February 1910 – 27 February 1996) was Ordinary of the Roman Catholic Diocese of Plymouth in the Province of Southwark from 9 April 1955 to 19 November 1985.

== Life ==
Cyril Edward Restieaux was born in Norwich, and ordained as a priest on 1 November 1932 in Rome. He was appointed Bishop of Plymouth on 9 April 1955 and was consecrated bishop on 14 June 1955 at Plymouth by Francis Grimshaw, Archbishop of Birmingham; John Murphy, Archbishop of Cardiff; and Joseph Rudderham, Bishop of Clifton. Restieaux attended the Second Vatican Council.

He was the principal consecrator of Christopher Budd, Bishop of Plymouth, and assisted at the consecration of the late George Dwyer, Archbishop of Birmingham, and the late James McGuinness, Bishop of Nottingham.

In 1986, Restieaux retired to Torquay, where he died in 1996, two days after his 86th birthday.

Catholic Church titles
Preceded by Francis Joseph Grimshaw	Bishop of Plymouth; 1955-1985	Succeeded by Hugh Christopher Budd
