= St Marychurch =

Area of Torquay, Devon, England

Coordinates: 50.482°N 3.524°W

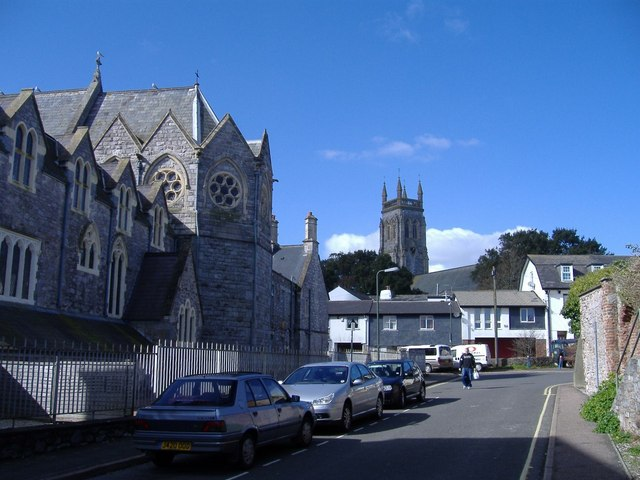
- St Dominic's Close, St Marychurch, with the tower of St Mary's Church in the distance

- Location within Devon
- Population: 11,262 (2011)
- OS grid reference: SX934651
- Unitary authority: Torbay
- Ceremonial county: Devon
- Region: South West
- Country: England
- Sovereign state: United Kingdom
- Post town: TORQUAY
- Postcode district: TQ1
- Dialling code: 01803
- Police: Devon and Cornwall
- Fire: Devon and Somerset
- Ambulance: South Western
- UK Parliament: Torbay

St Marychurch is an area of Torquay, in the Torbay district, in the ceremonial county of Devon, England. It is one of the oldest settlements in South Devon. Its name derives from the church of St Mary, which was founded in Anglo-Saxon times. The ward population taken at the 2011 census was 11,262.

== History and topography ==
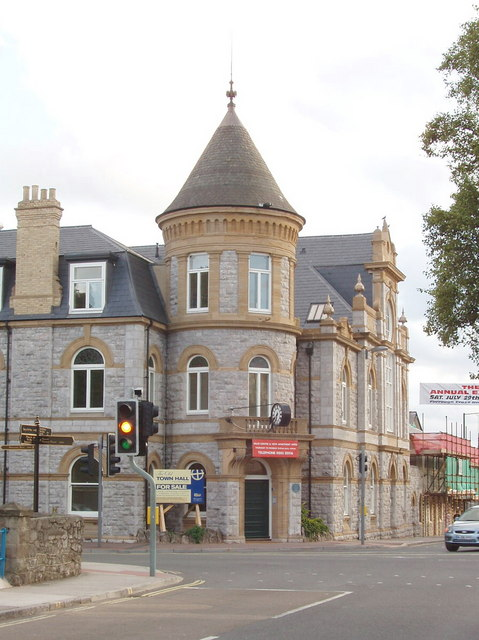
St Marychurch Town Hall

The parish of St Marychurch, which dates back to the Saxon period, was called Sce Maria circean when the Domesday Book was written and then became Seintmariachurche in 1242.

Notable former residents include 19th century zoologist and creationist Philip Henry Gosse, who lived at Sandhurst on Torquay Road (now called St Marychurch Road). The former town stretches from Plainmoor to Maidencombe and is known for its scenery, shopping precinct and neighbouring churches. These churches include:

- St Marychurch Parish Church with its high tower, and Saxon font dating from around 1110 AD. On Sunday May 30, 1943, the main part of this church was destroyed by a German bomb, killing 26 children and teachers.
- Our Lady Help of Christians & St Denis (Roman Catholic) with its high steeple.
- Furrough Cross United Reformed Church, originally a Free Church built by parishioners who objected to "Popish doctrines" (i.e. High Church ritual) at the parish church. The church was built 1852 under first minister Rev. Hugh Kelly, whose diocesan was the Bishop of Michigan, USA. It later severed all contact with the Anglican Church and later still became a Congregational church.

Tourist attractions include Babbacombe Cliff Railway, Babbacombe Downs with its fine views across Lyme Bay, Bygones Victorian Museum and the Model Village at Babbacombe.

The main shopping street (Fore Street) has two public houses, a hardware store, a post office, a fishmonger, butcher, baker, greengrocer, bookshop, pet shop, two supermarkets, and a long established greeting card and gift shop, as well as a number of cafés, estate agents and hairdressers. St Marychurch Town Hall, which is in Fore Street, was completed in 1883.

== Governance ==
St Marychurch is a former English urban district from 1894 until 1900 when it was incorporated into the neighbouring borough of Torquay.

	Chairmen of St Marychurch Urban District Council
January - April, 1895	G. T. Keppel
1895 - 1899	F. R. Evans
1899 - 1900	W. H. Grant

In 1921 the civil parish had a population of 9028. On 1 April 1924 the parish was abolished and merged with Torquay.
