= St Dominic's Holy Well =

Coordinates: 50.264°N 5.060°W

St Dominic's Holy Well is a natural spring located in the parish of St George, Truro, Cornwall.

The well now known as St Dominic's Well is located in the front garden of Carvedras House in St George's Road, Truro and is approached via stone steps which lead down from street level to the site. It appears to have been built in the 17th century.

However, this is not the real St Dominick's well. There has been a confusion between the original Carvedras House occupying the space taken up by 78 to 95 Kenwyn Street and the newer one on St George's Hill. In a lease of 1664 this area by the old Carvedras House was described as "all that decayed old pair of walls near the upper end of Carvoddris house adjacent to Carvoddris garden and orchard in Kenwyn together with 40' in the said orchard in breadth and 60' in length with 40' of ground more leading from the pear tree to the way bounding with the gate of John Robarts leading to St. Dominick's well". This must have been the lane beside 95 Kenwyn Street, which now goes past Kenwyn Mews, leading to what is marked on the old OS maps as "Friary Well site of". This must have been the real St Dominic's Well. This would have been the Well of the White Friars or Dominicans who resided in Truro on the Friary Meads of Carvedras Manor.

"The Dominican Friary stood between Kenwyn Street and the river ; it was founded by one of the Reskymer family, and was built in the 13th century, Bishop Bronescombe dedicating the church on Michaelmas day, 1259. About a century and a half ago, parts of the church, and of the holy well, were distinctly visible in a meadow called the Friary, but I am not aware that any remains at present exist. The site is intersected by Castle Street and Frances Street, and although I made a careful examination of the ground (accompanied by the Rev. W. Iago) some little time ago, we were unable to find any remains except a few worked stones built into walls. The church appeared by the plan of the south coast of Cornwall, temp Henry VIII., to have had a lofty tower with pinnacles, and it contained three bells. Thus in the 13th century Truro had grown to be a thriving town, whilst in 1339 it was the largest town in Cornwall, with the exception of Bodmin ; Lostwithiel coming third.

It was an important missionary centre with a church and chapter house. It is known that at the time of the Dissolution of the Monasteries in 1538 the Friary had a Prior and ten friars.
