= Cardinham Grange =

Monastic grange in Cornwall, England

Coordinates: 50.471477°N 4.651401°W

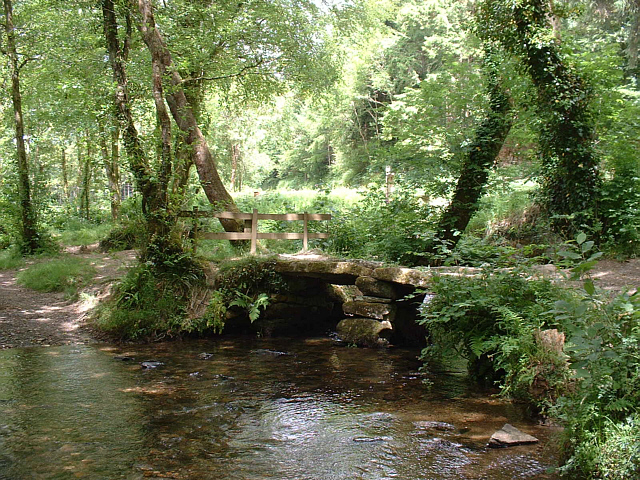
Lady Vale Bridge, Cardinham Woods, Cornwall. This ancient "clapper bridge", a simple form of stone bridge, crosses over Cardinham Water, a stream that runs through Cardinham Woods near Bodmin, Cornwall. The bridge, fenced-off for its own protection, stands near the former site of the Chapel of Our Lady.

Cardinham Grange was a monastic grange in Cardinham, Cornwall, UK. Lady Vale Chapel was given soon after the Norman Conquest by Richard Fitz Turold to the Abbey of St Mary de Valle near Bayeux intending that a cell of monks should be established. The abbey, finding the property burdensome, induced Richard to transfer it to the monastery of Tywardreath which he was then founding. It was served by monks from Tywardreath until the dissolution of the monasteries when the property was granted to the Duchy of Cornwall.
