= Diocese of Plymouth =

Roman Catholic diocese in England

Diocese of Plymouth Dioecesis Plymuthensis

Catholic
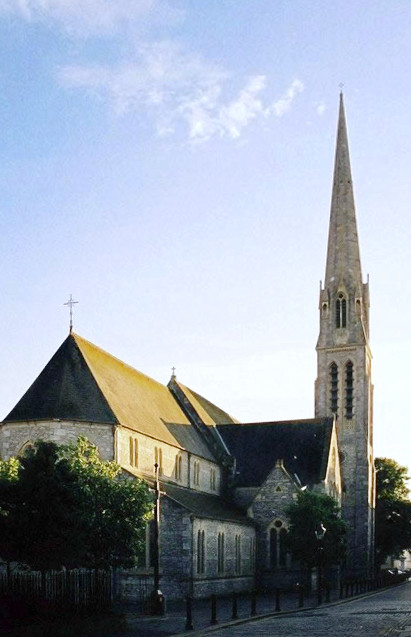
- The Cathedral Church of St Mary and St Boniface, Plymouth.

- Coat of arms

Location
- Country: England
- Territory: Cornwall; Devon; Dorset
- Ecclesiastical province: Southwark
- Metropolitan: Archdiocese of Southwark
- Deaneries: 5
- Coordinates: 50.591°N 3.987°W

Statistics
- Area: 12,831 km^{2} (4,954 sq mi)
- Population: Total; Catholics: (as of 2019); 3,847,700; 69,100 (1.8%)
- Parishes: 60

Information
- Denomination: Roman Catholic
- Sui iuris church: Latin Church
- Rite: Roman Rite
- Established: 29 September 1850
- Cathedral: Plymouth Cathedral
- Secular priests: 102

Current leadership
- Pope: Leo XIV
- Bishop: Nicholas Hudson
- Metropolitan Archbishop: John Wilson
- Vicar General: Canon Paul Cummins

Map
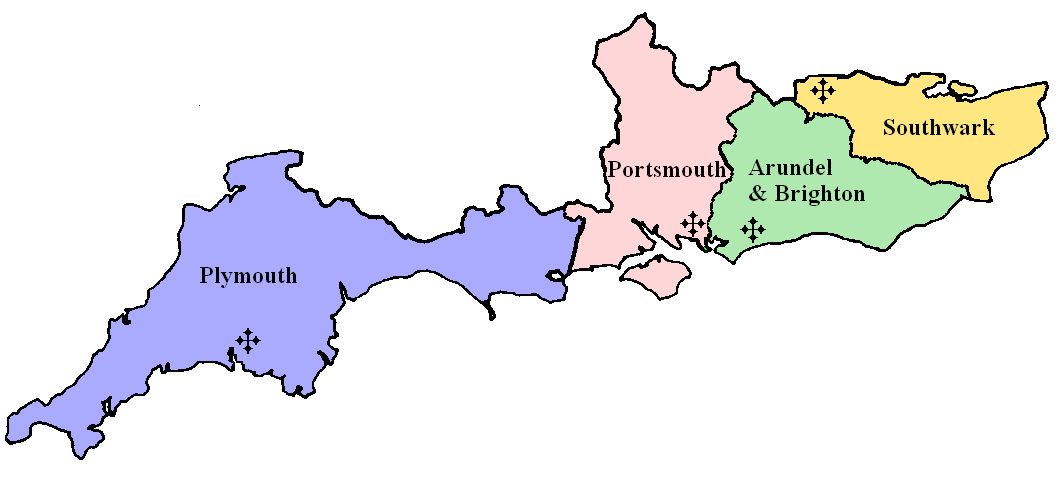
- Diocese of Plymouth within the Province of Southwark

Website
- plymouth-diocese.org.uk

The Diocese of Plymouth (Latin: Dioecesis Plymuthensis) is a Latin Church diocese of the Catholic Church in England. The episcopal see is in the city of Plymouth, Devon, where the bishop's seat (cathedra) is located at the Cathedral Church of St Mary and St Boniface.

== History ==
Erected as the Diocese of Plymouth in 1850 by Pope Pius IX, from the Apostolic Vicariate of the Western District, the diocese has remained jurisdictionally constant since. Since 1965, the diocese has been a suffragan see of the Ecclesiastical Province of Southwark; before then, from 1850 to 1911 it was in the Province of Westminster, then from 1911 to 1965 in the Province of Birmingham.

In December 2023, Christopher Whitehead from the Diocese of Clifton was appointed bishop-elect of the diocese, replacing Bishop Mark O’Toole, who had been appointed as Archbishop of Cardiff a year prior. His episcopal ordination was due to take place on 22 February. On 1 February, the Catholic Bishops' Conference of England and Wales released a statement that Whitehead was under canonical investigation, and that the ordination would not take place, no reason was given.

On 13 September 2024 it was announced that Pope Francis had appointed Philip Moger as bishop of the Diocese of Plymouth. He was due to be installed as bishop on Saturday 9 November at the Cathedral Church of St Mary and St Boniface, Plymouth. On 6 November, however, Moger issued an apology stating he intended to postpone his installation until termination of the investigation of personal issued raised. Mentions of due process in his statement raised the question of if Moger was subject to a canonical inquiry.

In February 2025, Pope Francis accepted Moger's request to step down from his appointment as Bishop of the Diocese of Plymouth. The diocese remained under the leadership of diocesan administrator Canon Paul Cumminns, until the appointment of Bishop Nicholas Hudson. Bishop Hudson was installed on 29th November 2025.

== Details ==
The diocese covers the counties of Cornwall, Devon and Dorset, stretching from Penzance and the Isles of Scilly in the west, to parts of Bournemouth in the east. It is divided into five deaneries: Cornwall, Dorset, Exeter, Plymouth, and Torbay. There are chaplaincies at the universities of Bournemouth, Exeter and Plymouth.

== Armorial ==
Although Catholic dioceses in England and Wales will not be granted official coat of arms by the College of Arms, many do impale heraldic designs on the coat of arms of the bishops. From 1855 and the second Bishop of Plymouth, William Vaughan to 1985 and the seventh bishop, Cyril Restieaux, the bishops placed the diocesan coat of arms next to their own. Bishop William Vaughan's tomb in Plymouth Cathedral features the diocese's coat of arms. From 1985, those coat of arms no longer were used and in 2013 Bishop Mark O'Toole impaled a different design next to his own, a ship on the sea and a star. However, in 2026, Bishop Nicholas Hudson impaled his coat of arms with the original diocesan one.

== Bishops ==
=== Ordinaries ===
- George Errington (Appointed on 27 June 1851 – Translated to Westminster as coadjutor archbishop on 30 March 1855)
- William Vaughan (Appointed on 10 July 1855 – Died on 24 October 1902)
- Charles Maurice Graham (Succeeded on 25 October 1902 – Retired on 16 March 1911)
- John Joseph Keily (Appointed on 21 April 1911 – Died on 23 September 1928)
- John Patrick Barrett (Appointed on 7 June 1929 – Died on 2 November 1946)
- Francis Joseph Grimshaw (Appointed on 2 June 1947 – Translated to Birmingham as metropolitan archbishop on 11 May 1954)
- Cyril Edward Restieaux (Appointed on 9 April 1955 – Retired on 19 November 1985)
- Hugh Christopher Budd (Appointed on 19 November 1985 – Retired on 9 November 2013)
- Mark O'Toole (Appointed on 9 November 2013 – Translated to Cardiff as metropolitan archbishop and Menevia on 27 April 2022)
- Nicholas Hudson (Appointed on 29 November 2025)

=== Coadjutor Bishops ===
- Charles Maurice Graham (1891-1902)
- James Moor (1890), did not take effect

=== Other priests of this diocese who became bishops ===
- Robert Brindle, appointed auxiliary bishop of Westminster in 1899, and then Bishop of Nottingham in 1901.
- Robert Bernard Brownlow, appointed Bishop of Clifton in 1894

== Churches ==
Cornwall: Bodmin (SS Mary & St Petroc), Tintagel (St Paul the Apostle), Falmouth (St Mary's)

Devon: Exeter Sacred Heart, Plymouth Cathedral of St Mary and St Boniface, Torquay (Assumption of Our Lady) and Torquay (Our Lady Help of Christians and St Denis)

Dorset: Dorchester (Holy Trinity), Weymouth (St Joseph)

Monasteries, abbeys and priories: Buckfast Abbey, Ivybridge St Austin's Priory, Lanherne Carmelite Community, Sclerder Abbey

== See also ==
- Catholic Church in England and Wales
- List of Catholic churches in the United Kingdom
