= Tregonan Grange =

Cistercian grange in Cornwall, England

Coordinates: 50.052183°N 5.090141°W

Tregonan Grange was a Cistercian grange of Beaulieu Abbey at Tregonan in the parish of St Keverne, Cornwall, England, UK. It was founded before 1263 and expropriated before 1527; "considerable remains" existing 1755 have since disappeared.

St Keverne was the site of a small Celtic monastery which survived the Norman Conquest but was seized soon after by lay hands. The lands of Tregonan came into the possession of the Cistercian Abbey of Beaulieu. The abbey maintained a small cell of monks at Tregonan to supervise their property. The ruins were said in 1925 to have been removed not long ago.
