= David Rogers (librarian) =

British librarian and bibliographer (1917–1995)

David McGregor Rogers (1917–1995) was a British librarian and bibliographer who was Head of Special Collections at the Bodleian Library from 1978 until his retirement in 1984.

== Life ==
Rogers was born in India on 29 May 1917, the son of an officer in the Indian Army, and spent his early childhood there. He was educated at Downside School and at New College, Oxford. After serving in India and Burma during the Second World War, he returned to Oxford University and completed a doctorate with a thesis on clandestine Catholic printing in England during the late 16th and early 17th centuries. This was the first doctorate awarded at Oxford University for a thesis in the field of bibliography.

Rogers began working at the Bodleian while still a graduate student, and remained there throughout his professional life, retiring in 1984. He was instrumental in reviving the Catholic Record Society after the Second World War, together with Antony Allison of the British Library and Thomas Birrell of Nijmegen University. He died at Blewbury, Oxfordshire, on 31 May 1995.

== Publications ==
- with Antony Alison, Catalogue of Catholic Books Printed Abroad or Secretly in England, 1558–1640 (1956)
- with P.E. Russell, A Catalogue of Hispanic Manuscripts and Books before 1700 from the Bodleian Library and Oxford College Libraries Exhibited at the Taylor Institution 6–11 September 1962 (1962)
- with Antony Alison and W. Lottes, The Contemporary Printed Literature of the English Counter-Reformation between 1558 and 1640 (2 vols, 1989–1994)
- The Bodleian Library and its Treasures, 1320 to 1700 (1991)
