= Plymouth Cathedral =

Church in Devon, England

Coordinates: 50.3737°N 4.1516°W

- Cathedral Church of Saint Mary and Saint Boniface
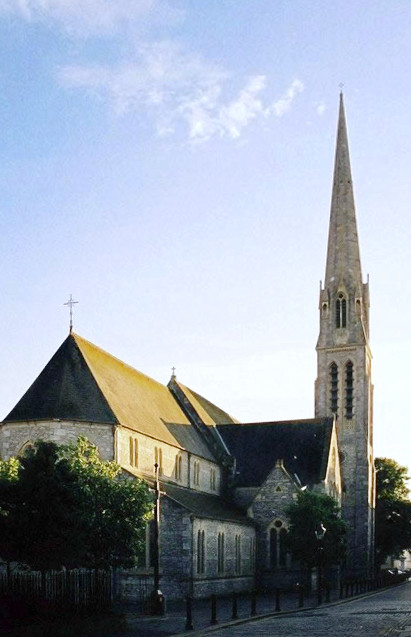
- View of the cathedral from the north east

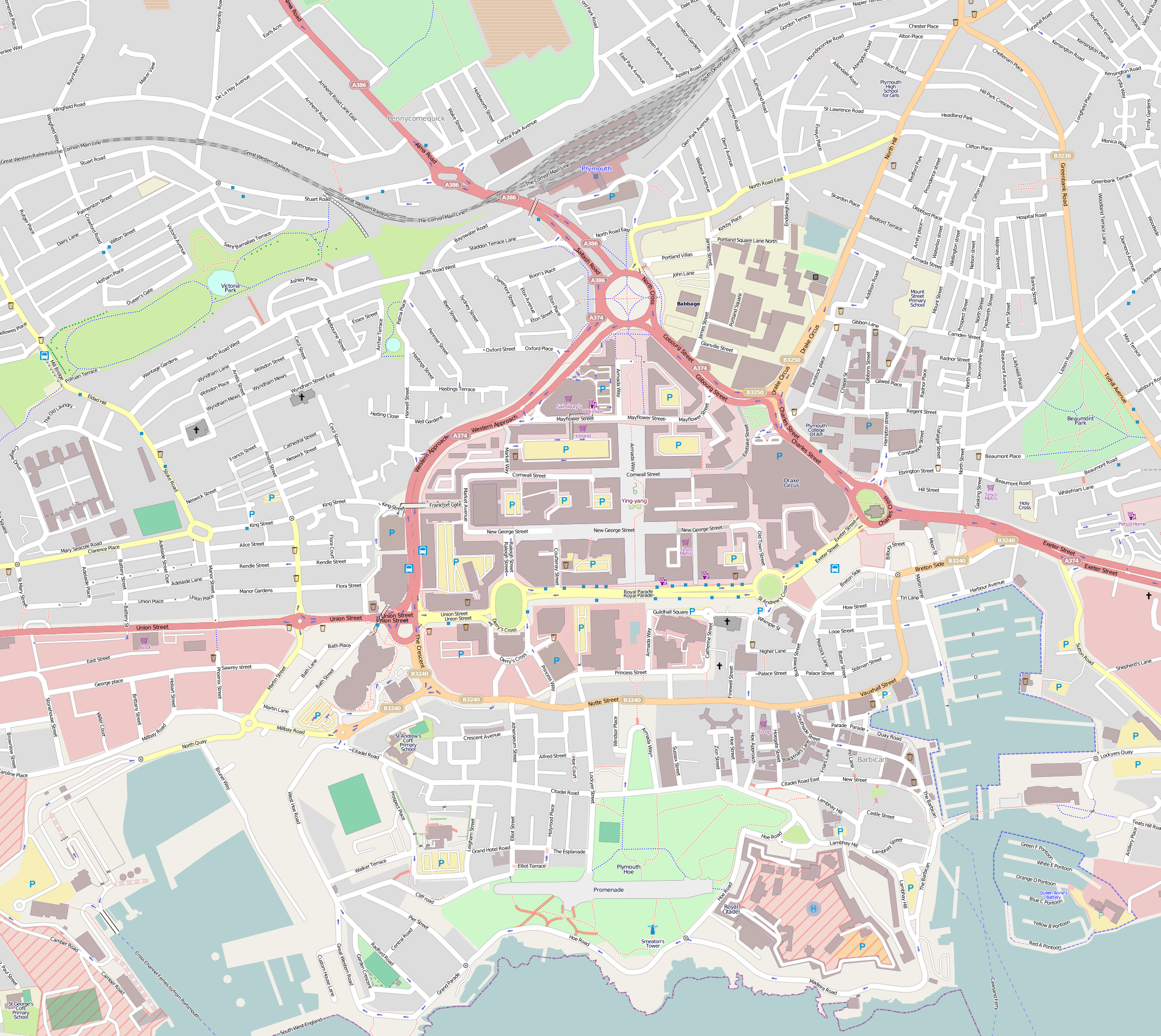
- Shown within Plymouth
- OS grid reference: SX4710054859
- Location: Plymouth, Devon
- Country: England
- Denomination: Roman Catholic
- Website: plymouthcathedral.co.uk

History
- Status: Active
- Consecrated: 1880

Architecture
- Heritage designation: Grade II
- Designated: 1 May 1975
- Architect: J. A. Hansom
- Style: Early English Gothic
- Years built: 1856—1858

Administration
- Province: Province of Southwark (since 1965)
- Diocese: Plymouth
- Deanery: Plymouth

Clergy
- Bishop: Nicholas_Hudson_(bishop)
- Dean: Canon Mark O'Keeffe

The Cathedral Church of Saint Mary and Saint Boniface in Plymouth, England, is the seat of the Bishop of Plymouth and mother church of the Roman Catholic Diocese of Plymouth, which covers the counties of Cornwall, Devon and Dorset. The Diocese of Plymouth was created in 1850 after the issuing of the papal bull Universalis Ecclesiae. In 1858 the new condign cathedral was opened and put under the patronage of the Virgin Mary and Saint Boniface, the latter thought to have been born in Crediton in the area of the diocese.

The cathedral is also used by Royal Navy personnel stationed at HMNB Devonport for the annual naval mass celebrated in July.

== History ==
=== Founding ===
Prior to the Reformation Exeter Cathedral was the seat of the bishops whose diocese included all of Devon and Cornwall. In 1850, under Catholic emancipation, Plymouth became the centre for Cornwall, Devon and Dorset in the reconstructed Catholic diocesan structure. The first bishop was consecrated on 25 July 1851: George Errington, a Yorkshireman who was notable for visiting Dartmoor Prison weekly. Four years later Errington was appointed coadjutor Archbishop of Westminster, and on 19 July 1855, William Vaughan from Bristol was consecrated the new Bishop of Plymouth.

=== Construction ===
Since the diocese's foundation, the small church of Saint Mary, erected in 1807 at Saint Mary Street, had served as Pro-cathedral. Vaughan decided to build a cathedral replacing the pro-cathedral. On 20 February 1856, he bought a portion of land on the town's outskirts. It cost £3,904: £1,000 from Mr Bastard and the remaining money was raised throughout the diocese and elsewhere in England. Joseph Hansom and Charles Hansom were the architects and local men from Stonehouse built it. Work commenced on 22 June, during which a Royal Navy officer fired new Turkish Man-of-war guns in Plymouth Sound, which caused subsidence. The cathedral was opened with Mass on 25 March 1858 (the Feast of the Annunciation), and consecrated by Vaughan on 22 September 1880.

=== Convent School ===
On 26 July 1860 the Sisters of Notre Dame de Namur, who looked after poor schools, settled in the presbytery of St Mary's Church. On 19 October 1858, they purchased land near the cathedral and opened a convent and girls' boarding and day school. It was closed after being bombed during the Plymouth Blitz of 1941. It has now been redeveloped as a residential complex. The Notre Dame Catholic School is now located in the Plymouth suburb of Derriford.

== See also ==
- Roman Catholic Bishop of Plymouth
- St Boniface's Catholic College
