= Nicholas Hudson (bishop) =

English prelate (born 1959)

The Right Reverend Nicholas Hudson
- Bishop of Plymouth
- Church: Roman Catholic Church
- Archdiocese: Southwark
- Province: Southwark
- See: Plymouth
- Appointed: 21 October 2025
- Installed: 29 November 2025
- Predecessor: Philip Moger
- Previous posts: Titular Bishop of St Germans (2014-2025); Auxiliary Bishop in Westminster (2014-2025)

Orders
- Ordination: 19 July 1986 by Michael Bowen
- Consecration: 4 June 2014 by Vincent Nichols

Personal details
- Born: 14 February 1959 (age 67) Wimbledon, England
- Denomination: Roman Catholic
- Motto: In Te Domine Speramus

Nicholas Gilbert Erskine Hudson (born 14 February 1959) is an English prelate of the Catholic Church and current Bishop of Plymouth. He served as an auxiliary bishop of the Roman Catholic Archdiocese of Westminster from 2014 to 2025.

== Early life and ordained ministry ==
Nicholas Hudson was born on 14 February 1959 in Wimbledon, London. He completed his high school studies at the Jesuits' Wimbledon College and then studied at Jesus College, Cambridge, earning a master's degree in history. From 1981 to 1987 he was trained for the priesthood at the Venerable English College in Rome, studying at the Pontifical Gregorian University where he obtained a bachelor's degree and a licentiate in dogmatic theology. He was ordained a priest for the Archdiocese of Southwark on 19 July 1986.

He was first assistant priest in the parish of Canterbury from 1987 to 1991 and then spent a year at the Catholic University of Louvain for catechetical studies. From 1993 to 2000 he was director of the Christian Education Centre of the Archdiocese of Southwark. In July 1993 he was named a member of the council of consultors of the archdiocese. In September 2000 he became vice rector of the Venerable English College and was then rector from January 2004 to September 2013, when he became the parish priest of Sacred Heart Church in Wimbledon, the parish where he was baptised and ordained.

== Episcopal ministry ==
Pope Francis named him an auxiliary bishop of Westminster and titular bishop of Sanctus Germanus on 31 March 2014.

He received his episcopal consecration on 4 June 2014 from Cardinal Vincent Nichols, Archbishop of Westminster, on 4 June 2014. In that role he had responsibility for the pastoral care of Central and East London, consisting of the Deaneries of Camden, Hackney, Islington, Marylebone, Tower Hamlets and Westminster. He also had oversight of the Diocese of Westminster's Agency for Evangelisation, Youth Ministry, and Justice and Peace.

On 7 July 2023, the Vatican announced that Pope Francis had named him to participate in the Synod of Bishops on Synodality.

On 21 October 2025, Pope Leo XIV named him as bishop for the Diocese of Plymouth. He took possession of the see on 29 November 2025.
