= Roman Catholic Bishop of Plymouth =

Catholic ecclesial title in England

Bishop of Plymouth
- Bishopric

catholic
- Incumbent: Nicholas Hudson

Location
- Ecclesiastical province: Southwark

Information
- Established: 1850
- Diocese: Plymouth
- Cathedral: Plymouth Cathedral

The Bishop of Plymouth is the Ordinary of the Roman Catholic Diocese of Plymouth in the Province of Southwark, England.

The diocese covers an area of 12,831 km^{2} (4,954 sq mi) and consists of the counties of Cornwall, Devon and Dorset. The see is in the City of Plymouth where the bishop's seat is located at the Cathedral Church of Saint Mary and Saint Boniface.

The diocese of Plymouth was one of the dioceses erected on 29 September 1850 from the Vicariate Apostolic of the Western District. The Right Reverend Mark O'Toole, the 9th Bishop of Plymouth, was appointed on 9 November 2013 by Pope Francis. In June 2022, he was translated to both the Archbishopric of Cardiff and the Bishopric of Menevia; the see becoming vacant.

In December 2023, Pope Francis appointed Canon Christopher Whitehead of the Diocese of Clifton to become the 10th Bishop of Plymouth. Bishop-Elect Christopher was to be installed on 22 February 2024. On 1 February, the Bishops of England and Wales announced that his ordination was cancelled, pending a canonical process investigating Canon Whitehead, who stepped down from active ministry during the investigation. Whitehead was subsequently cleared of all charges, and returned to ministry in Clifton. In September 2024, Pope Francis appointed Bishop Philip Moger, auxiliary bishop of the Archdiocese of Southwark, to become the 10th Bishop of Plymouth, to be installed on 9 November 2024. On November 6, however, Moger issued an apology stating he intended to postpone his installation until termination of the investigation of personal issued raised. Finally, on 24 February 2025, Bishop Moger announced via the Catholic Bishops Conference of England and Wales that the pope had accepted his resignation from the appointment to the see of Plymouth, as the resolution of ‘concerns of a personal nature’ had ‘taken longer than anticipated’. The Right Reverend Nicholas Hudson was installed as the Bishop of Plymouth at the Cathedral Church of St Mary and St Boniface, Plymouth, on the Patronal Feast Day of St Cuthbert Mayne, Saturday 29 November 2025.

== List of bishops ==
Roman Catholic Bishops of Plymouth
From	Until	Incumbent	Notes
1851	1855	George Errington	Appointed bishop on 27 June 1851, consecrated on 25 July 1851, and installed on 7 August 1851. Translated to Westminster as Coadjutor Archbishop on 30 March 1855.
1855	1902	William Vaughan	Appointed bishop on 10 July 1855 and consecrated on 16 September 1855. Died in office on 24 October 1902.
1902	1911	Charles Maurice Graham	Appointed Coadjutor Bishop of Plymouth on 25 September 1891 and consecrated on 28 October 1891. Succeeded Bishop of Plymouth on 25 October 1902. Retired on 16 March 1911 and appointed Titular Bishop of Tiberias. Died on 2 September 1912.
1911	1928	John Joseph Keily	Appointed bishop on 21 April 1911 and consecrated on 13 June 1911. Died in office on 23 September 1928.
1929	1946	John Patrick Barrett	Formerly an auxiliary bishop of Birmingham (1926–1929). Appointed Bishop of Plymouth on 7 June 1929. Died in office on 2 November 1946.
1947	1954	Francis Joseph Grimshaw	Appointed bishop on 2 June 1947 and consecrated on 25 July 1947. Translated to the archbishopric of Birmingham on 11 May 1954.
1955	1985	Cyril Edward Restieaux	Appointed bishop on 9 April 1955 and consecrated on 14 June 1955. Retired on 19 November 1985 and died on 27 February 1996.
1986	2013	Hugh Christopher Budd	Appointed bishop on 19 November 1985 and consecrated on 15 January 1986. Retired on 9 November 2013 and died on 1 April 2023.
2014	2022	Mark O'Toole	Appointed bishop on 9 November 2013 and consecrated on 28 January 2014 Translated to both the Archbishopric of Cardiff and Bishopric of Menevia on 20 and 22 June 2022 respectively.
2024	2025	Philip Moger	On 13 September 2024 it was announced that Pope Francis had appointed Moger as bishop of the Diocese of Plymouth. He was due to be installed as bishop on Saturday 9 November at the Cathedral Church of St Mary and St Boniface, Plymouth. On 6 November, however, Moger issued an apology stating he intended to postpone his installation until termination of the investigation of personal issued raised. Mentions of due process in his statement raised the question of if Moger was subject to a canonical inquiry. In February 2025, Pope Francis accepted Moger's request to step down from his appointment as Bishop of the Diocese of Plymouth. He is listed by the Vatican as Bishop Emeritus of Plymouth, in spite of never having taken possession of the See.
2025	present	Nicholas Hudson	Previously Auxiliary in Westminster. Appointed October 2025.

== See also ==
- St Boniface's Catholic College - school houses are named for the bishops of Plymouth
