= William Vaughan (bishop) =

British clergyman

The Right Reverend William Vaughan
- Bishop of Plymouth
- Province: Southwark
- Diocese: Plymouth
- Installed: 10 July 1855
- Term ended: 25 October 1902
- Predecessor: George Errington
- Successor: Charles Maurice Graham

Personal details
- Born: 14 February 1814
- Died: 25 October 1902 (aged 88) Abbotskerswell Priory, Devon
- Denomination: Roman Catholic

William Joseph Vaughan (14 February 1814 – 25 October 1902) was a British clergyman who held high office in the Roman Catholic Church as the second bishop of Plymouth.

== Life ==
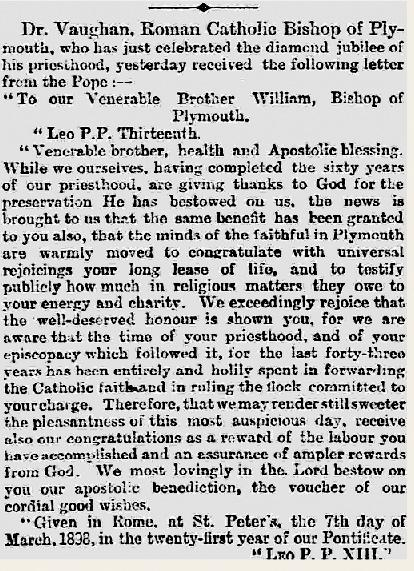
Congratulatory letter of pope Leo XIII to bishop Vaughan in occasion of his diamond jubilee of priesthood 1898

He was born on 14 February 1814 in London, England, the second son of William Vaughan, of an old recusant (Roman Catholic) family, the Vaughans of Courtfield, Herefordshire. Educated at Stonyhurst, Oscott, and St. Acheul, in France, he was ordained a priest on 10 March 1838 at Prior Park. In 1845 he was appointed president of Prior Park College, but was moved to Clifton Cathedral three years later.

He was elevated to the episcopate as Bishop of Plymouth on 10 July 1855, a post he held until his death. It is to him that the diocese of Plymouth owes its first organisation and consolidation. In 1862 he was named assistant at the Pontifical throne.

The 60th Anniversary of his priesthood was celebrated in March 1898, when he received a congratulatory letter from Pope Leo XIII.

His health failing, he moved in 1891 to St. Augustine's priory, Abbotskerswell, near Devon, and appointed a coadjutor bishop to perform the actual work of the position. He died at Abbotskerswell on 25 October 1902, and was buried at St Augustine's Priory. His remains were reinterred in the Lady Chapel vault at the Cathedral Church of Saint Mary and Saint Boniface in Plymouth on 13 December 1998.

== Legacy ==
St Boniface's Catholic College in Plymouth has a House named after him.

Cardinal Herbert Vaughan and Bishops Roger Vaughan and John Stephen Vaughan were his nephews, and Bishop Francis John Vaughan was a great-nephew.

== See also ==
- St Boniface's Catholic College, Plymouth
