= Bodmin (disambiguation) =

Bodmin is a town in Cornwall, England, UK.

Bodmin may also refer to:

== Places ==
- Bodmin, Saskatchewan, a hamlet in Canada
- Bodmin Moor, in Cornwall

== Politics ==
- Bodmin (UK Parliament constituency), a historic UK parliamentary constituency
  - 1906 Bodmin by-election
  - 1922 Bodmin by-election

== People ==
- Robert Robartes, Viscount Bodmin (1634–1682), an English diplomat and politician

== Other ==
- Bodmin manumissions, a 9th-century manuscript
- Bodmin Riding, a custom in Bodmin
