= Bodmin Guildhall =

Municipal building in Bodmin, Cornwall, England

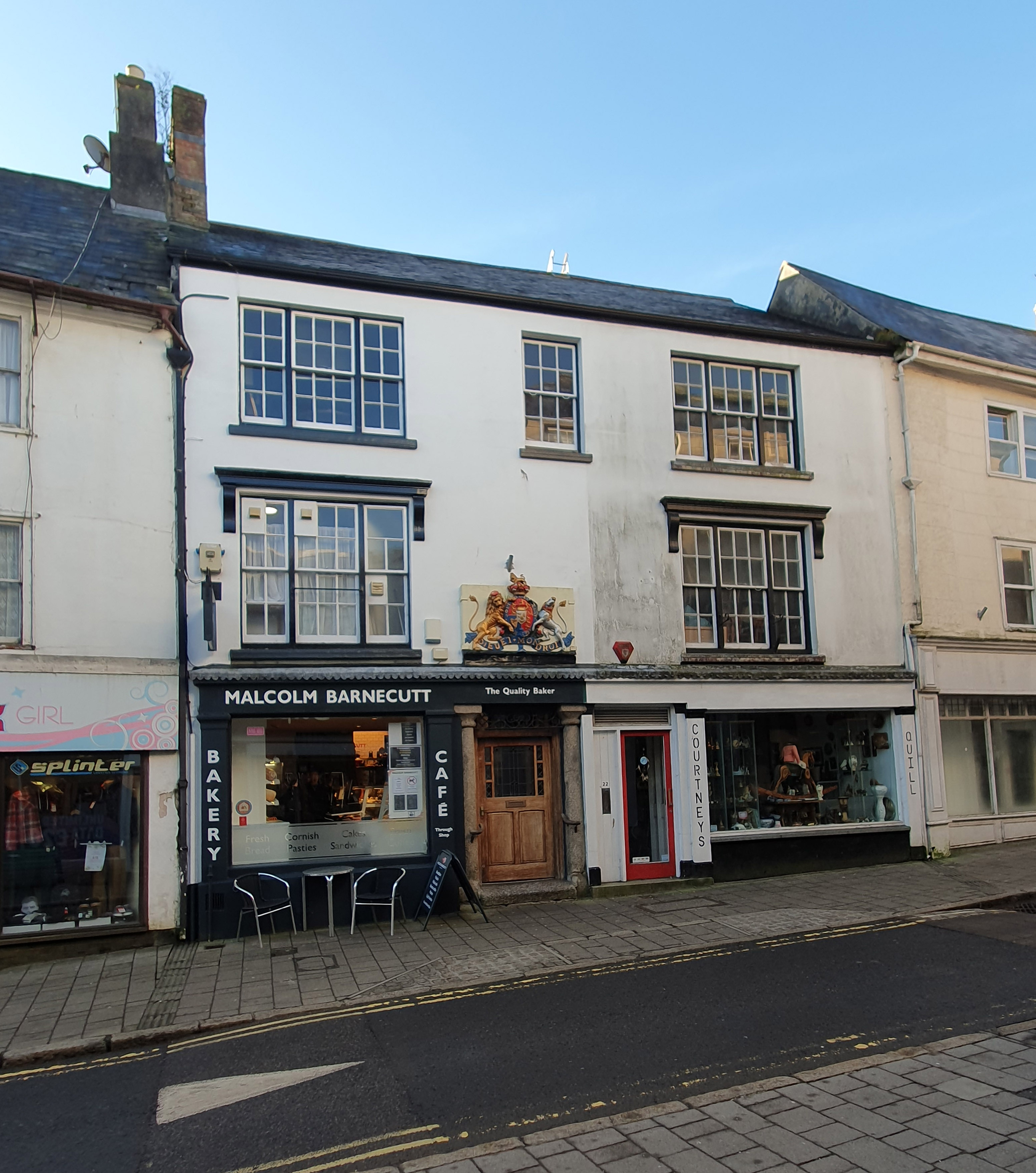
- The building in 2023

- Shown in Cornwall
- 50.4710°N 4.7199°W
- Location: Fore Street, Bodmin, Cornwall, England

History
- Built: c.1536

Site notes
- Architectural style: Medieval style

Listed Building – Grade II
- Official name: No. 22 and Guildhall
- Designated: 26 March 1949
- Reference no.: 1206466

Bodmin Guildhall is a historic building in Fore Street in Bodmin, a town in Cornwall, in England. The structure, which was used for municipal purposes before being converted for use as a baker's shop and restaurant, is a Grade II listed building.

== History ==
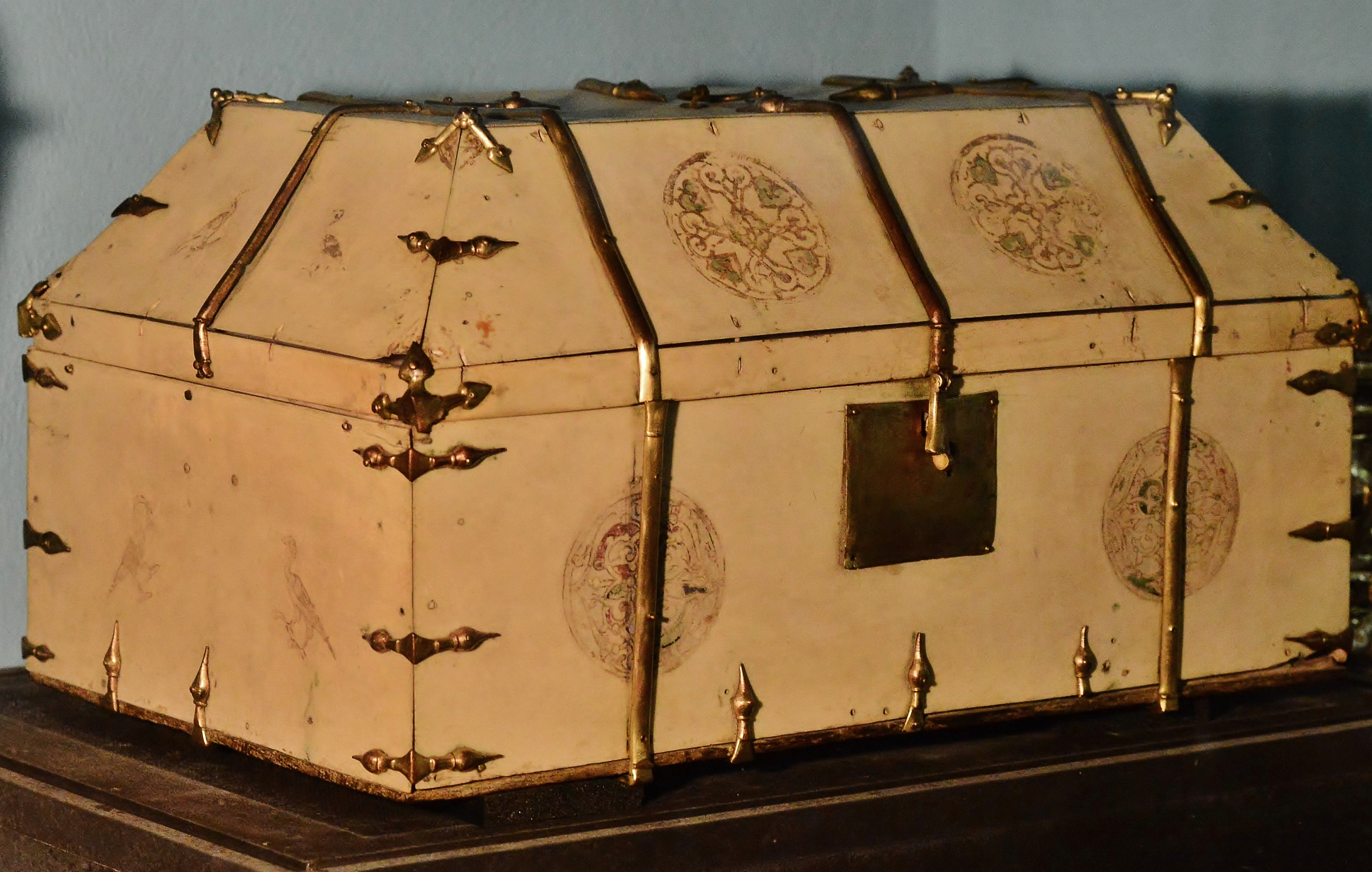
The ivory casket that was held in the guildhall from the mid-16th century to the early 20th century

The building was commissioned as a meeting place for the ancient borough of Bodmin. The site the borough leaders selected had been occupied by St Petroc's Guild of Skinners and Glovers. The building was designed in the medieval style, built in rubble masonry with granite dressings and dates back to around the time that the royal charter was granted in 1563. The design involved an asymmetrical main frontage of three bays facing onto Fore Street. A cross-wing was added behind the main structure in the 17th century. The cross-wing was fenestrated at the east end by a stained glass window which depicted, in each of the four quadrants, the arms of four nations of the United Kingdom.

The Methodist cleric, John Wesley, preached at the guildhall in August 1779, and the lord of the manor, Francis Basset, 1st Baron de Dunstanville, presented a royal coat of arms which was installed above the doorway in 1807. Following the implementation of the Municipal Corporations Act 1835, the feudal borough officials were replaced by an elected council, which continued to hold its meetings in the building.

In 1906, the council reconstructed the front portion of the building, and renovated the remainder, to provide a dedicated council chamber. The cross-wing was further fenestrated on the south side by a stained glass window which depicted, in each of the four quadrants, the royal arms, the county arms, the borough arms, and the arms of the local priory. Following the renovations, the ground floor comprised an entrance hall and waiting room, the first floor had the council chamber and town clerk's office, the second floor was the surveyor's office, and there was a storeroom on the third floor. An ivory casket, which had contained the bones of Saint Petroc at Bodmin Priory until they were destroyed during the dissolution of the monasteries, was retained in the guildhall until at least the early 20th century, when it was removed to St Petroc's Church.

By the mid-1940s, the borough council needed extra space and, in 1948, it relocated to Priory House, the former home of William Pennington, in Priory Road, which itself dated from 1790. Shop fronts were then inserted into the guildhall at ground floor level, and in 1949, the building was grade II listed. Following local government organisation in 1974, the guildhall was used by Bodmin Town Council as a meeting place and this continued until May 1983, when the building was sold to the local baker, Malcolm Barnecutt, for use as a baker's shop and restaurant. Town council meetings were subsequently held at the Shire Hall.

== Architecture ==
The building is constructed of rubble with granite dressings, with rendered studwork at the front. Its roof is largely covered with slates, but partly with bitumen. The central doorway, which is flanked by a pair of Ionic order columns supporting an entablature may be original, and above it is a royal coat of arms affixed in the central bay on the first floor which is otherwise blind. The outer bays on the first floor are fenestrated by large tri-partite sash windows flanked by brackets supporting cornices, while the second floor is fenestrated by two more tri-partite sash windows with a single sash window installed between them. The cross-wing at the rear is fenestrated by four original mullioned windows.
