= NCB Radio =

Radio station in Cornwall, England

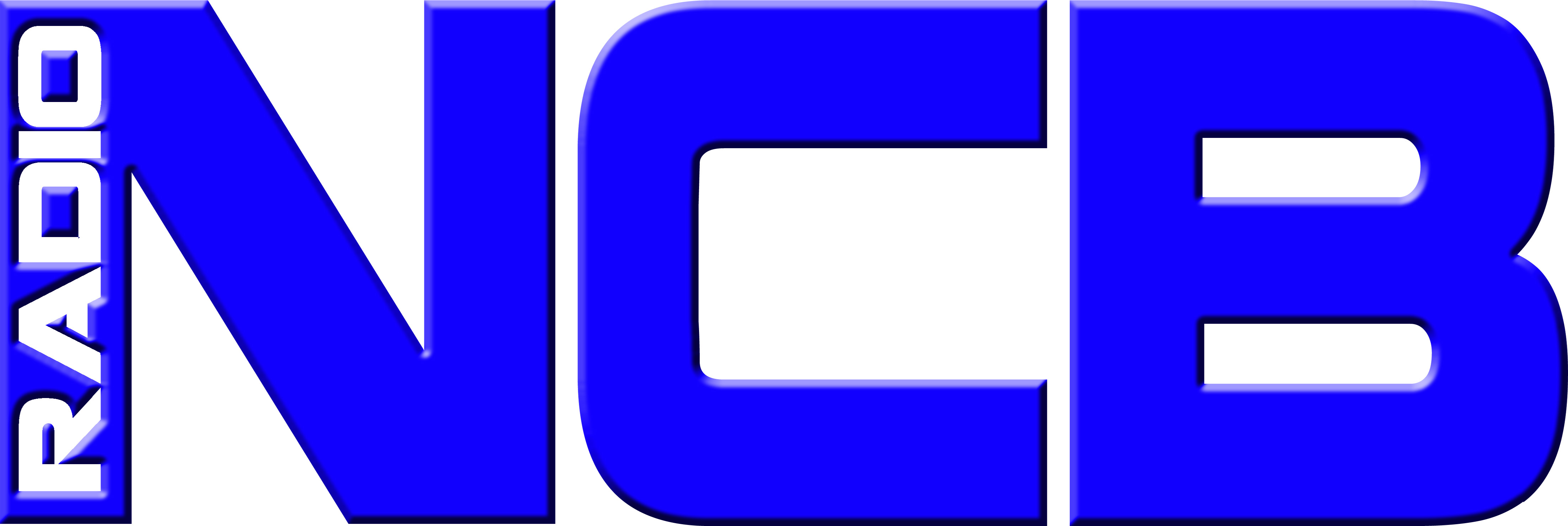

England
- Broadcast area: North Cornwall

Programming
- Format: Community Radio/Internet Radio

Ownership
- Owner: North Cornwall Broadcasting CIC

History
- First air date: 7 January 2011

Links
- Website: NCB Radio

NCB Radio is an internet community radio station serving the community of North Cornwall in England, UK.

== Origins ==
NCB Radio was originally formed in November 2009 by former Bodmin College radio station manager Aaron James as Bodmin Community Radio, to be a community radio station focusing on Bodmin, Cornwall. Bringing on board the team he worked with at Bodmin College Radio when it became defunct upon his departure in July 2009 alongside then Radio Pembrokeshire presenter Dave Gould, it morphed into “North Cornwall’s BC Radio” (BC Radio being a deference to the project’s origins) in March 2010 when it became evident that a radio project solely for Bodmin would not be financially sustainable, combined with the realisation that North Cornwall was underserved as an area in terms of media output. A trial broadcast also took place during June 2010, encompassing live broadcasting at the year’s Royal Cornwall Show. This in turn became NCB Radio in November 2010 through a rebranding to reflect the project’s new name: North Cornwall Broadcasting. It launched on 7 January 2011 at 6 pm.

April 2015 saw the departure of its founder Aaron James along with approximately half the team, going onto form a new venture – Jollify. Since 2020 Jonathan Parry's Spriggs Radio Show is also simulcast every Tuesday 8pm on Liskeard Radio.

== Output ==
Unlike the majority of similar community radio stations, NCB Radio operates a commercial radio style playlist combined with a community style presentation. All shows are produced and presented locally by a team of volunteers with automation taking place during times where there is no presenter. Central to the plans of NCB Radio is an emphasis on attendance and promotion of local events as well as organising events of their own. Current programmes include What the Butler Heard with Justice H. Keystone (a comedy show), The Thursday Night Sessions with Dan and Phil (comedy/music programme) and The NCB Evening Show (the flagship show on NCB Radio, predominantly featuring news of both local and national relevance).

The Move to the Ark Community Hub has seen the team expand their schedule, and will shortly see them expand to a full-time schedule.

== Sponsorship and support ==
Evolve Bodmin (a bodmin based computer company) sponsored NCB Radio during 2011. Recent times have seen Wadebridge based companies Open Telecom International and Alive Music Studios also join the group of supporters. The station is primarily funded by the team behind NCB Radio. Supporters of the scheme have included TV Presenter Richard Madeley and North Cornwall MP Dan Rogerson. NCB Radio has also teamed up with The Ark, Cornwall, A social enterprise that works with children, young people and families, and now have a purpose built studio in their building. 2012 saw local solicitors Sproulls come on board as primary sponsors, complementing the existing sponsor roster. NCB Radio is currently offering free advertising for local businesses in return for posters/flyers being displayed at their business.
