= Castleton Garland Day =

Festival in Castleton, England

Garland Day
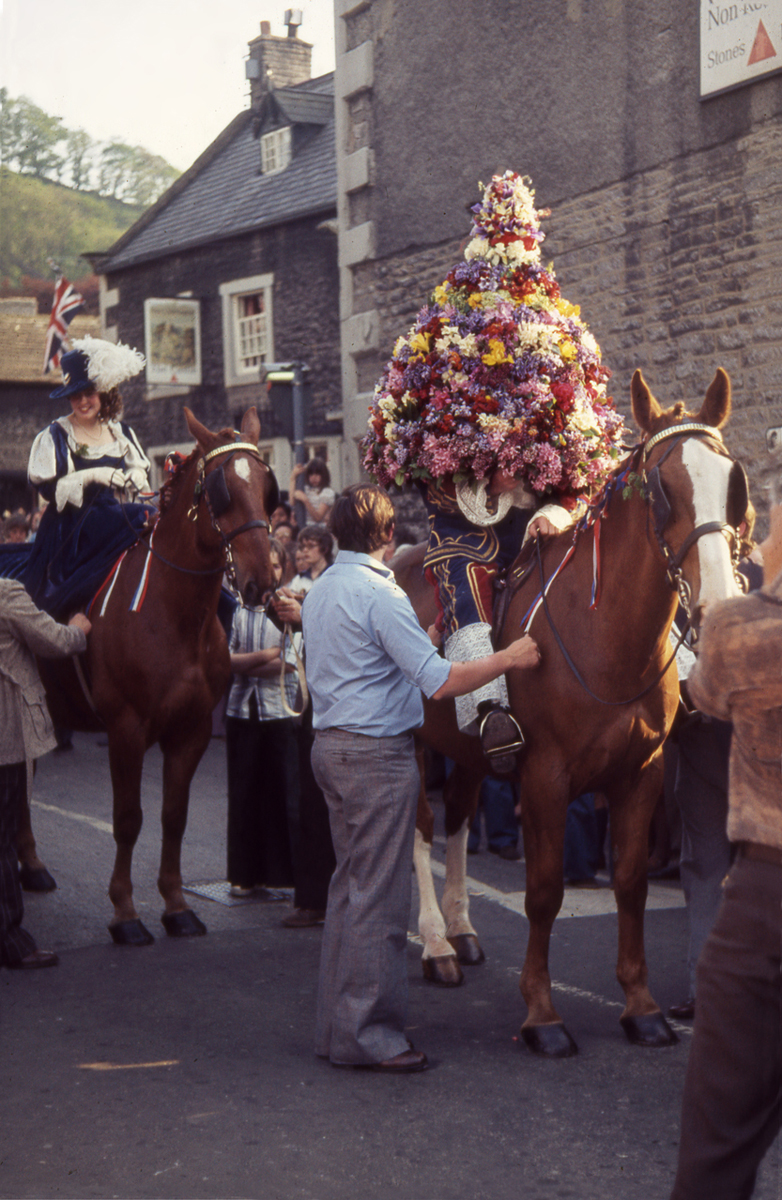
- The Garland King and his consort (c.1976)
- Type: Local
- Date: 29 May
- Next time: 29 May 2027
- Frequency: annual
- Related to: May Day; Rushbearing; Beating the bounds; Oak Apple Day

Castleton Garland Day or Garland King Day is held annually on 29 May (unless that date falls on a Sunday, when the custom is transferred to the Saturday) in the town of Castleton in the Derbyshire Peak District. The Garland King, on horseback, and covered to the waist in a heavy, bell-shaped floral garland, leads a procession through the town.

== Origins ==
The date of the custom coincides with Oak Apple Day and it is said to commemorate the restoration of King Charles II in 1660. By the 1960s, it had become received wisdom that the celebration was a remnant of a more ancient form of nature worship, and in 1977 one folklorist—whom Georgina Boyes describes as "a Celticist with a vivid line in descriptive prose..."—declared it to be based on a much older rite of human sacrifice. When this was reported in the national media, it attracted the attention of sceptical academics.

Boyes' subsequent extensive research of local records demonstrated that the "ancient" custom was no older than the late 18th—early 19th century, and had grown out of the village's ecclesiastical rushbearing festival. The bellringers of the festival had first been replaced in 1897 by morris men, and then—as the day increasingly became a tourist attraction—by "schoolgirls in white" and participants "in historical costumes" to "prettify" the event. The Maypole was first used in the festival in 1916. This "acceptable piece of 'folk' pageantry" became the new custom, and remained so throughout the 20th and 21st century, with the only change being the use of a female to play the Lady, instead of a male in "drag", from the late 1950s onwards.

== The custom ==
Starting from midday, most of the afternoon is taken up with the construction of the Garland, a roughly bell- or beehive-shaped wooden framework to which are tied bunches of garden flowers. Once it is finished, a small posy named "The Queen", made of particularly fine flowers tied around a short stick, is inserted as a topknot into the top of the garland.

In the late afternoon the Garland King and his female consort (confusingly, sometimes mistakenly referred to as "The Queen", but formerly simply "The Lady"), dressed in Stuart costume, mount their horses. The Garland, which is said to weigh between 56 and 60 lb (25 and 27 kg) is placed over the King's head and shoulders; only his legs are visible beneath it. The dance starts at one of the village's pubs (the starting point is chosen on rotation). The riders and Castleton Silver Band then lead an evening procession around the town, stopping at various points, including all the pubs. Young schoolgirls dressed in white, with flowers, carrying small "maypoles" (known as "Garland sticks") twined with ribbons, follow behind; they dance a form of morris dance at each stopping-place.

When the circuit of the village is complete, the King rides up to the churchyard gates, where the Queen (posy) is removed from the top of the Garland. It is kept on one side to be placed on the village's war memorial. The King rides to the foot of the tower of St Edmund's church where all the pinnacles but one have been decorated with oak leaf branches. A long rope is hung down and tied to the Garland, which is hoisted up the side of the tower and then impaled on the central pinnacle. It remains there for several days until the flowers have wilted. Formerly it was left to fall apart completely.

The day concludes with maypole dancing in the Market Place and the ceremonial placing of the Queen posy on the war memorial. Then the residents of the village follow the band back through the village dancing the "Criss-Cross."

== Gallery (c.1976) ==
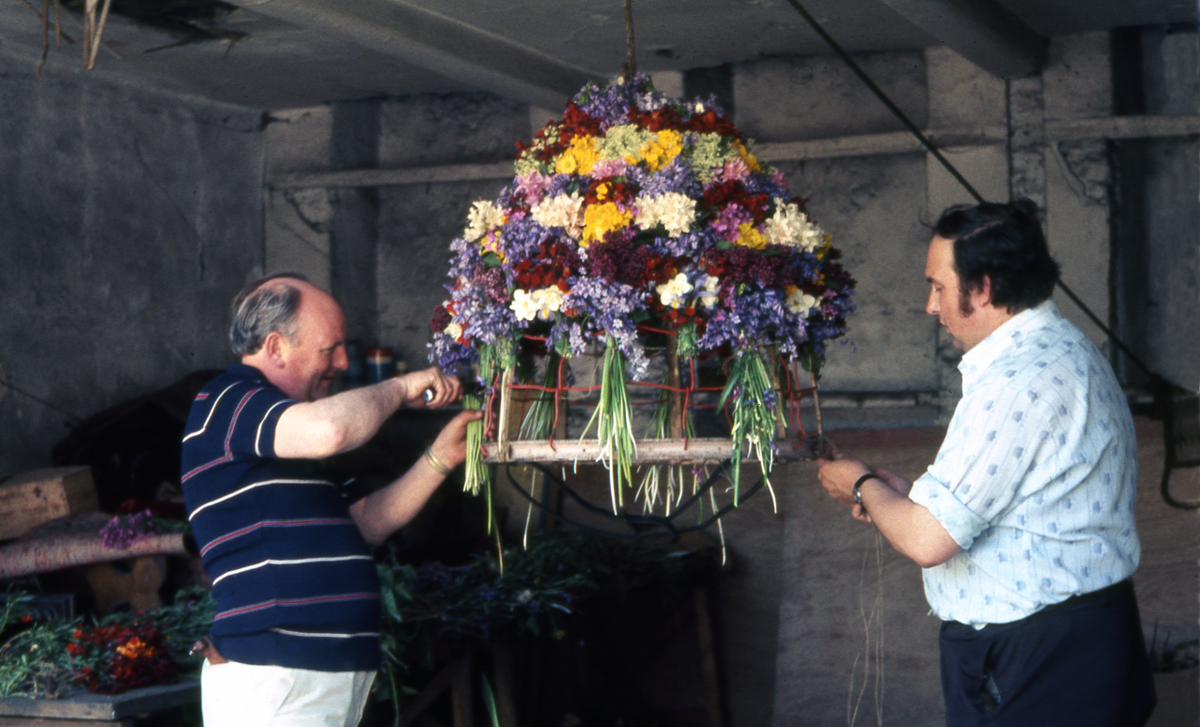
Constructing the garland

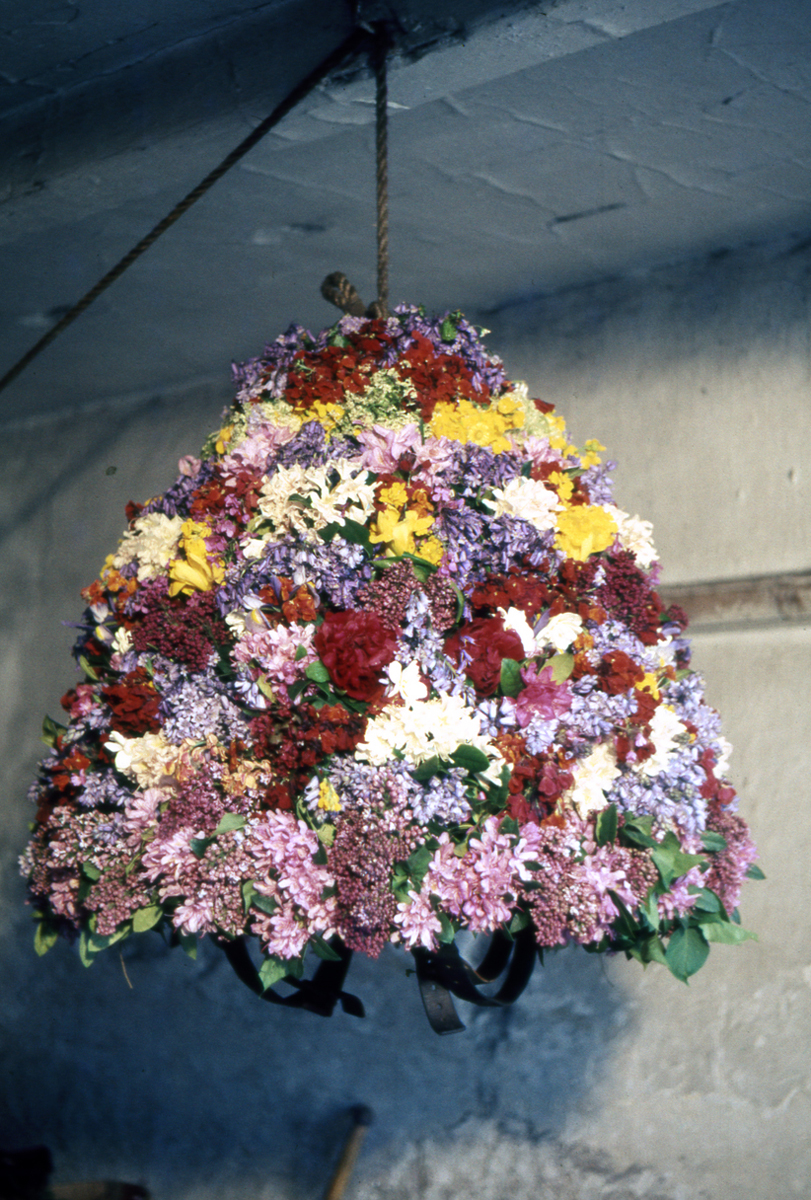
The finished garland

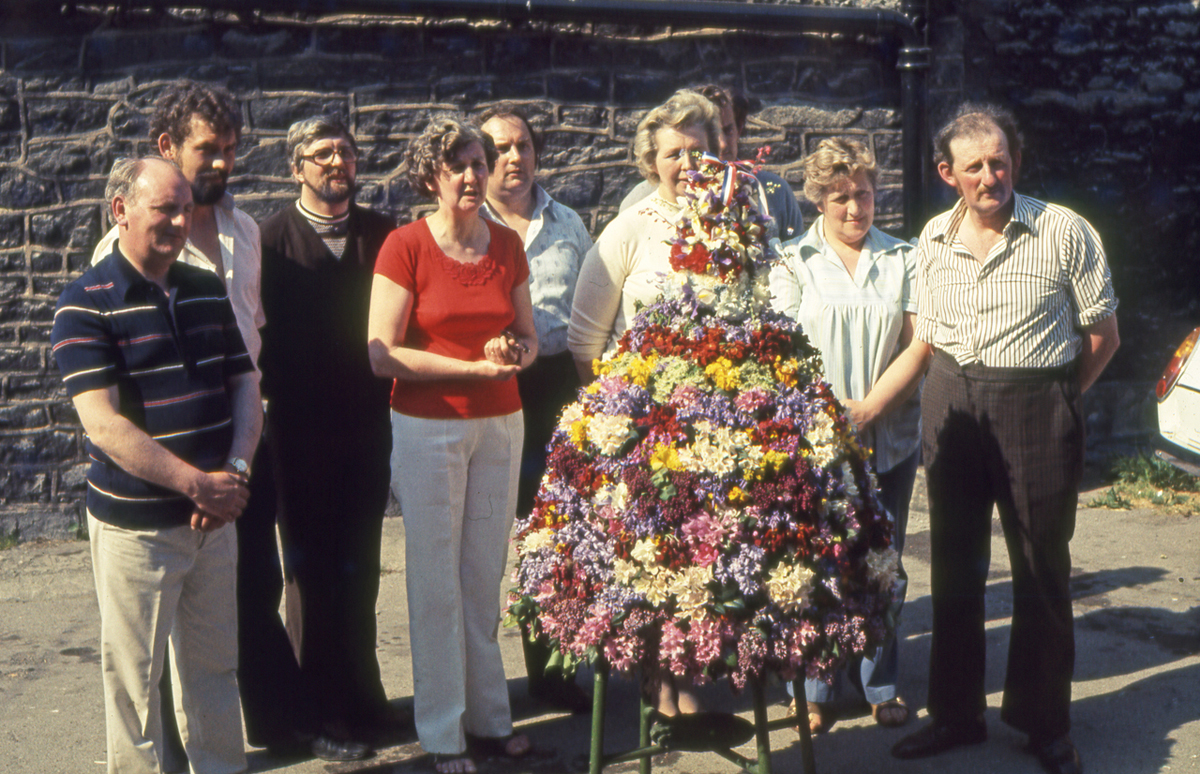
Garland with "Queen" posy

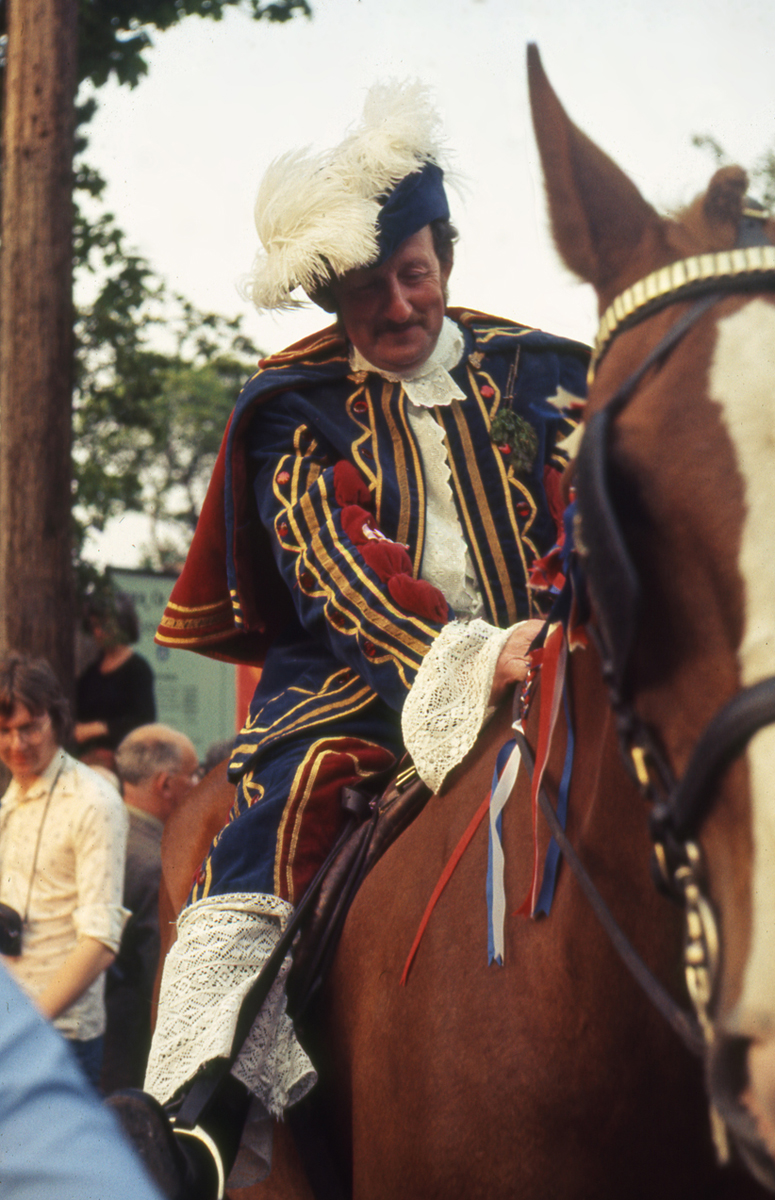
The King in costume

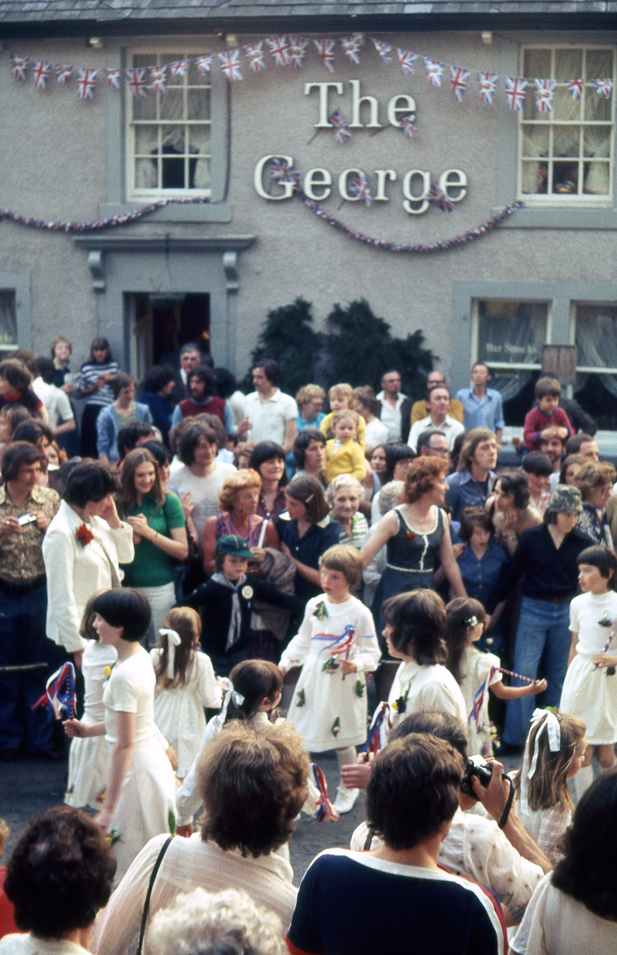
Dancing outside a pub

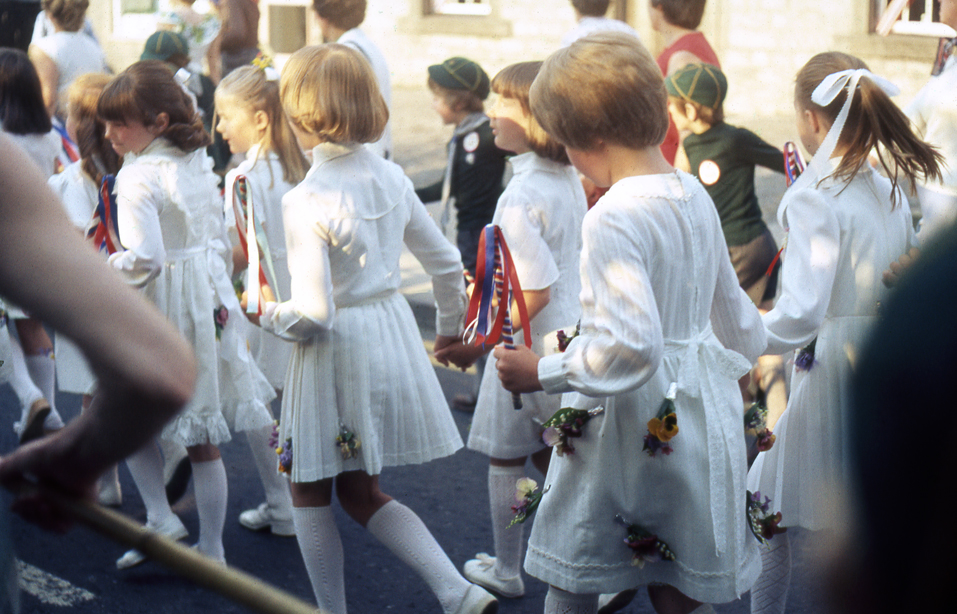
Dancers in procession

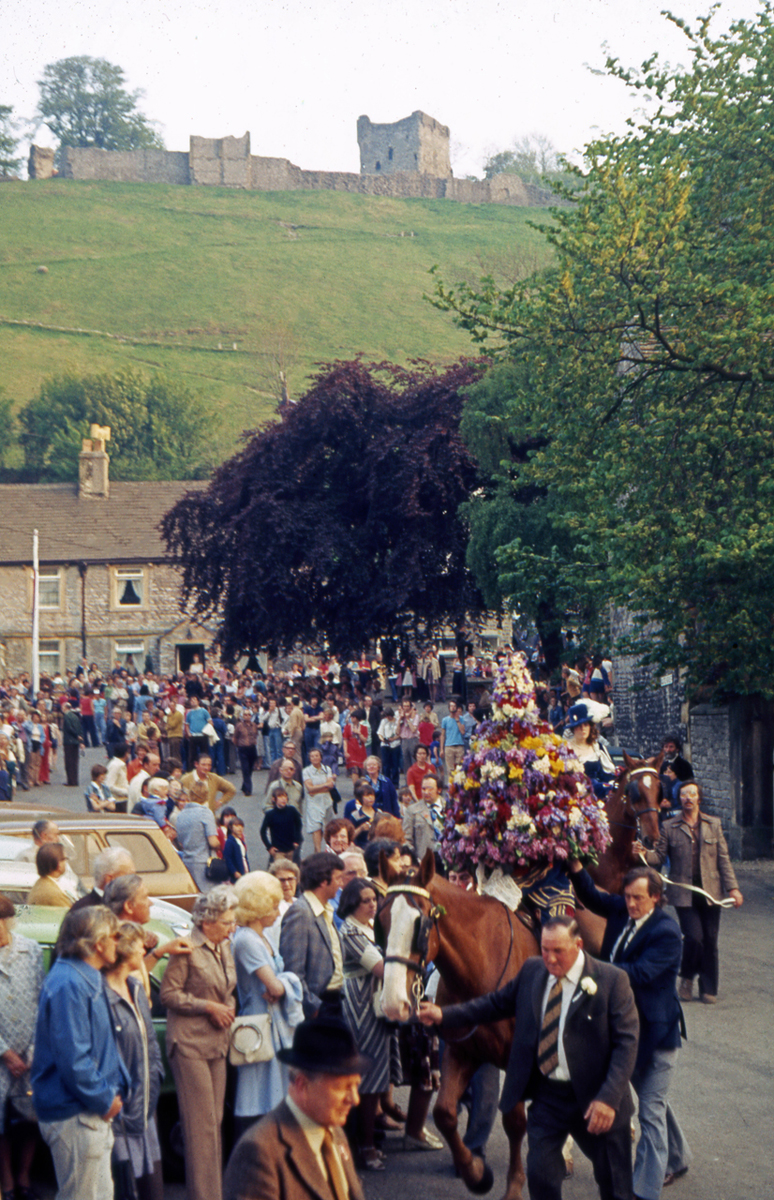
Procession approaching churchyard gates

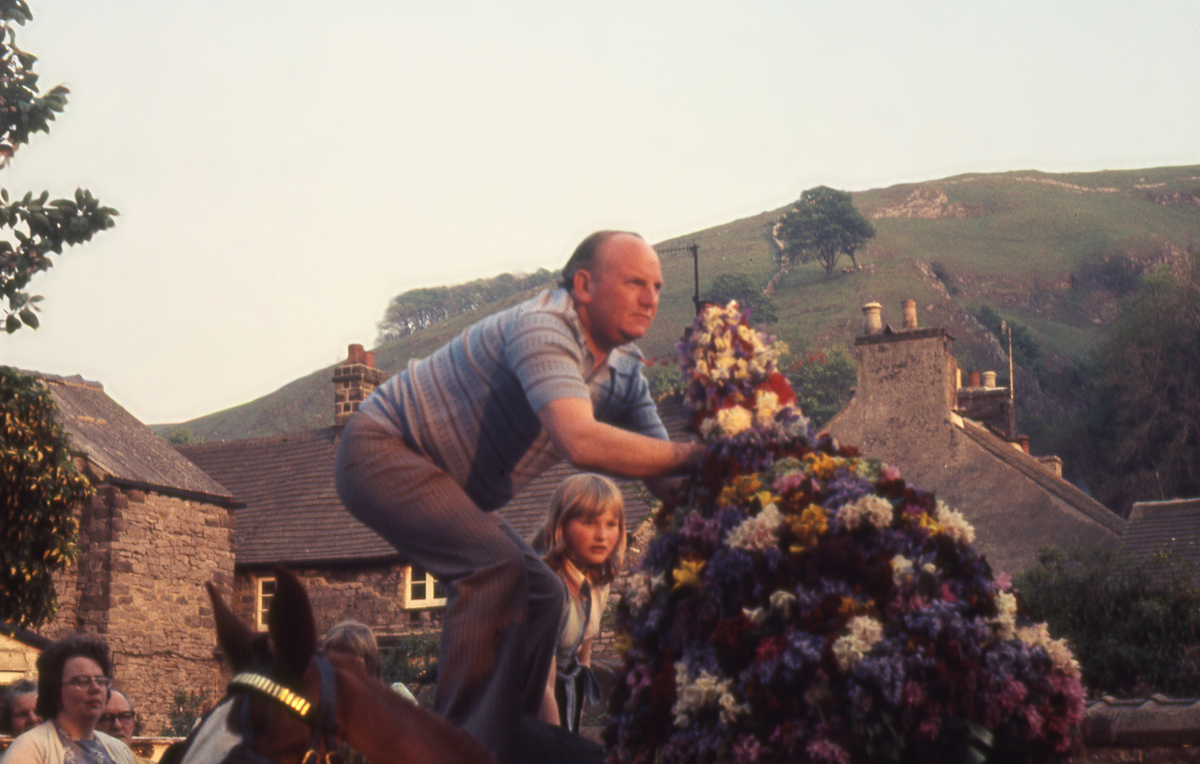
Removing the "Queen"

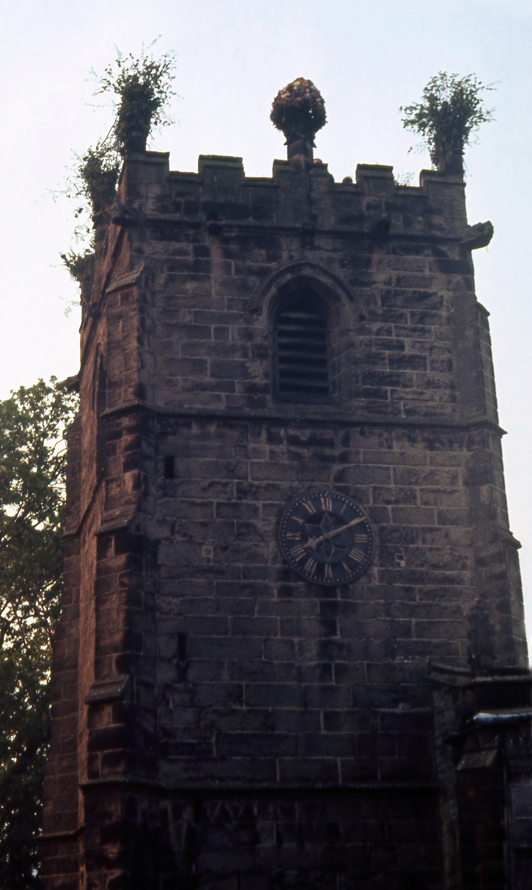
Garland on St Edmund's church tower

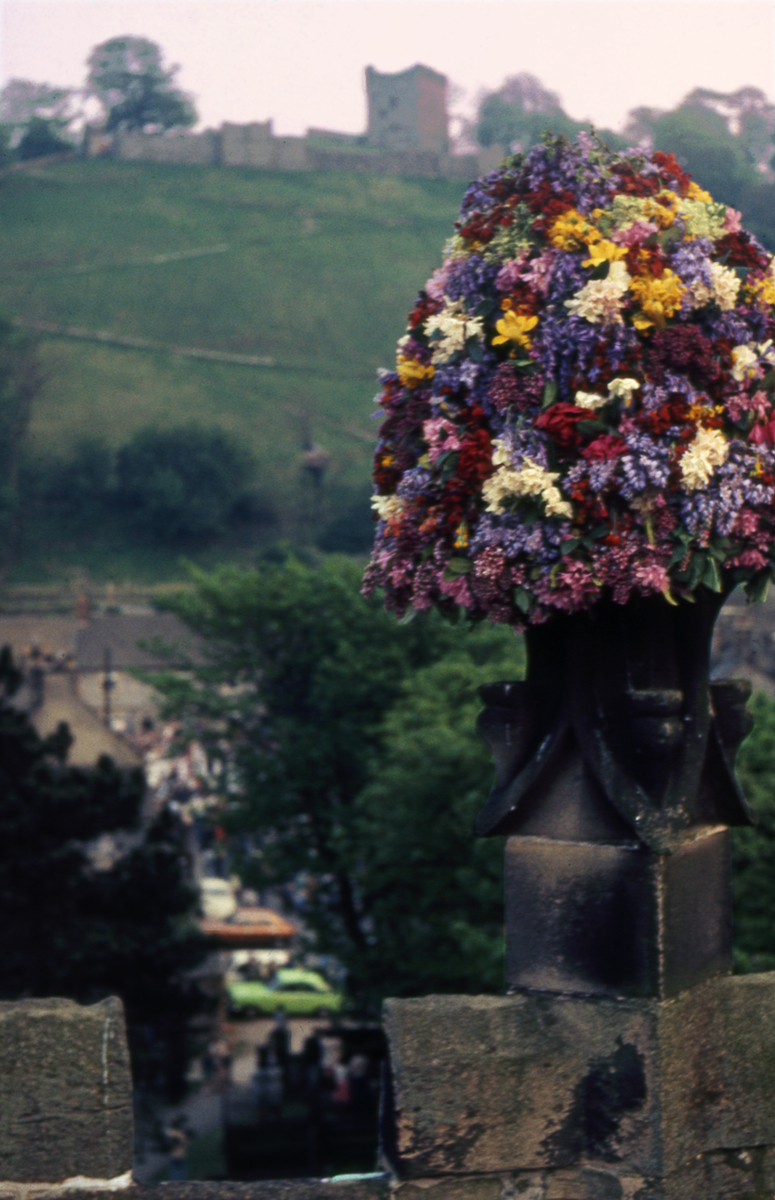
Garland on pinnacle (castle in distance)

== See also ==
- Jack in the green
- Bodmin Riding
- Beating the bounds
- May Day
- Abbotsbury Garland Day
