= Murder of Charlotte Dymond =

1844 murder in Cornwall

Charlotte Dymond
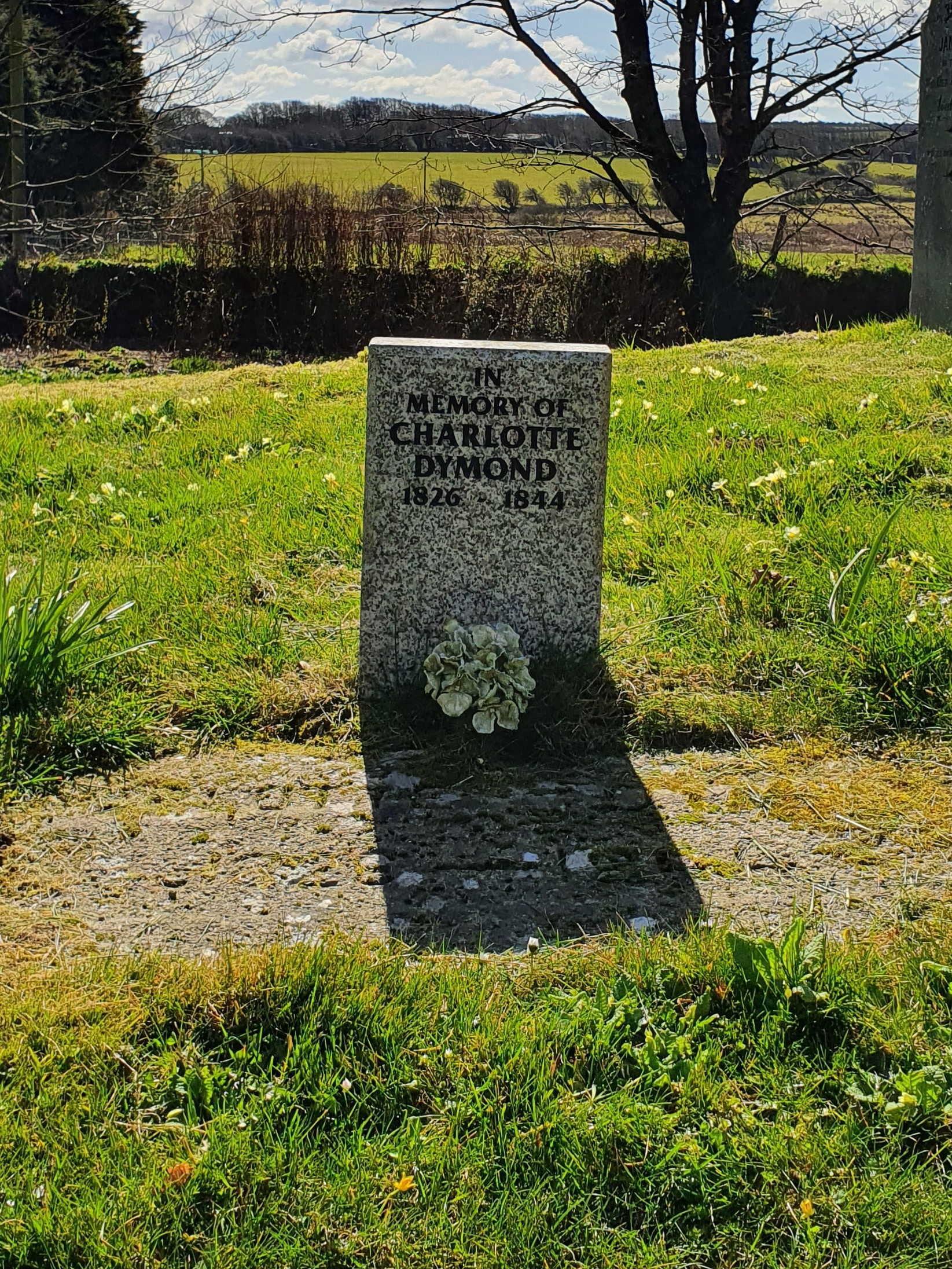
- Charlotte Dymond's grave, at St David's Church, Davidstow, Cornwall
- Born: 1826; England
- Died: 14 April 1844 (aged 18); Bodmin Moor
- Cause of death: Stabbing by Matthew Weeks
- Burial place: Davidstow
- Monuments: Charlotte Dymond Memorial
- Parent: Unknown

Charlotte Dymond (1826 – 14 April 1844) was an 18-year-old servant who was the victim of a notorious murder which influenced the folklore of Bodmin Moor. In 1844, she was found dead on the moor in grisly circumstances. A fellow farm worker, Matthew Weeks, was convicted of the crime and sentenced to death. The notorious crime inspired poetry, songs, and ghost stories in Cornish folklore. It is considered to be one of the most infamous murders in Cornwall.

== Crime ==
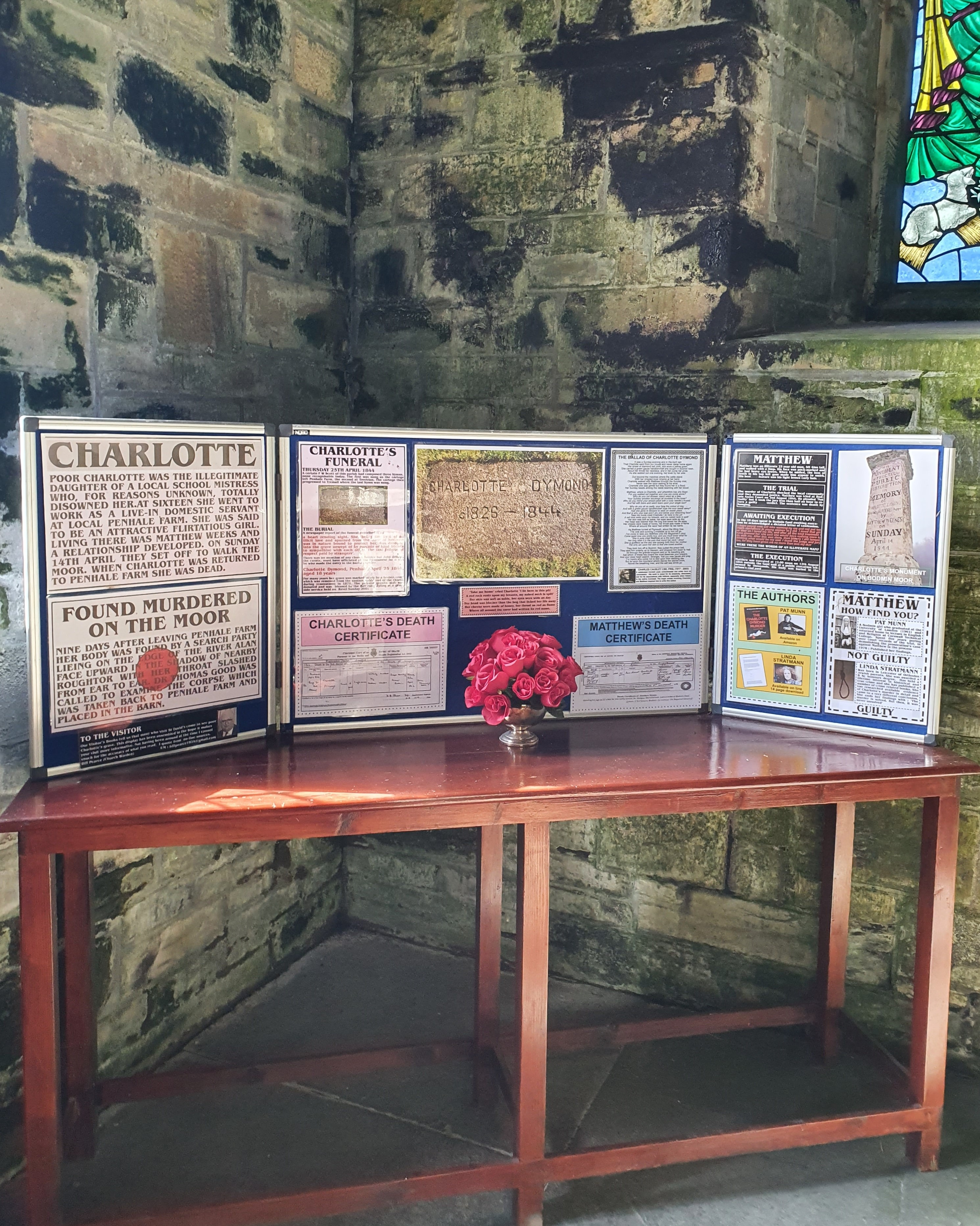
Exhibition on the murder at St David's Church, Davidstow

Charlotte Dymond was born in Cornwall into poverty and illegitimacy. She was a servant at Penhale Farm, which was situated between Camelford and Davidstow, on the outskirts of Bodmin Moor. The farm where she worked was owned by Phillipa Peter, an elderly widow and her son John. Dymond resided with two other live-in servants, John Stevens and Matthew Weeks (also spelled Weekes), who also worked for the farm. Although Dymond and Weeks were believed to be courting, she was also thought to have romantic feelings for her employer's nephew, Thomas Prout. It was thought that Prout and Dymond intended to elope.

On 14 April 1844, Dymond and Weeks were seen leaving the property and making their way to the moor. She was wearing a distinctive green striped dress and Weeks was recognised by an old farmer by his characteristic limp. When he returned alone later that night suspicion was aroused by his muddy trousers and a torn shirt. He told the household that Charlotte Dymond had been offered a new job in Blisland.

Charlotte Dymond was missing for a week before the discovery of her body. Her body was found at a high-point at Roughtor Ford. A post-mortem found her throat had been sliced from ear to ear. The coroner was Joseph Hawley and his deputy was Gilbert Hamley. Weeks fled to Plymouth and planned to flee to the Channel Islands when an arrest warrant was issued. When he was captured he pleaded his innocence.

Circumstantial evidence implicated Weeks as he was the last person to see her alive, as well as his erratic behaviour after she went missing. It was believed that Charlotte was planning to leave him and she was killed in a fit of jealous rage. Due to subsequent research, considerable doubt was raised surrounding his guilt. An alternative hypothesis suggested she was killed by a secret admirer.

== Trial ==
Weeks stood trial in August 1844 at Shire Hall in Bodmin. He was found guilty of the murder. At noon on 12 August 1844, Weeks was hanged in front of Bodmin Gaol. He was buried in the coal yard adjoining the gaol.

== Legacy ==
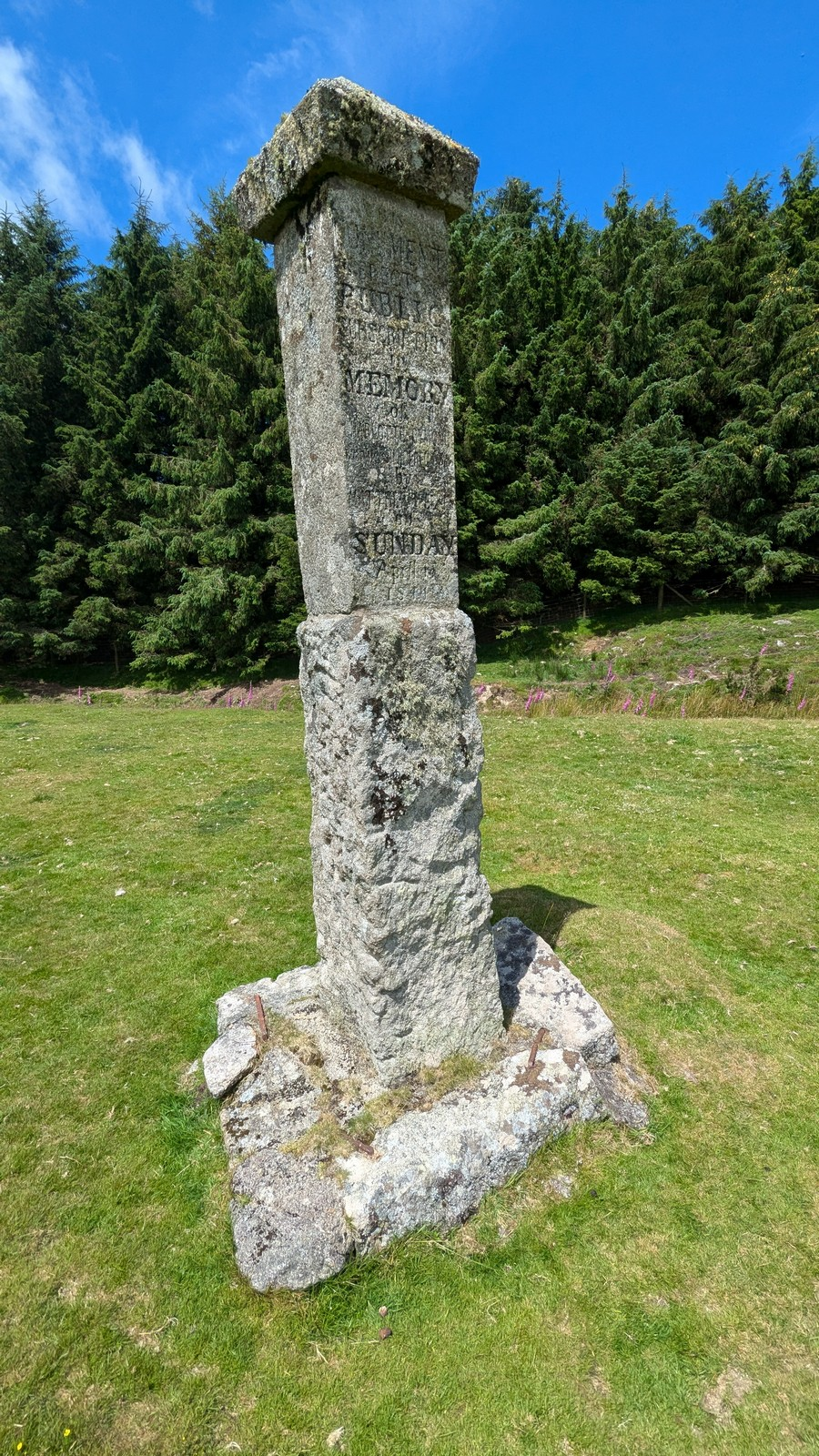
The Charlotte Dymond Memorial in 2024

The crime influenced local folklore inspiring poems, songs and ghost stories, including The Ballad of Charlotte Dymond by Charles Causley. The Charlotte Dymond Memorial, which commemorates her life, stands on Bodmin Moor and is a Grade II listed building. The monument is listed due to its rarity as a mid-19th-century memorial to a domestic servant paid for by public subscription which was unusual at the time.

In 1978 a local historian, Pat Munn, wrote a book on the murder. In the same year the case was adapted for a televised reconstruction. In 2001 the case was part of a historical exhibition at Shire Hall. The exhibition involved an immersive reenactment of the trial. Author Jill Batters presented a talk "The Life of Charlotte Dymond" at Liskeard Old Cornwall Society in 2019.

The British-Australian author Brand King sets much of his second novel, A Cornish Spring on Bodmin Moor. The novel evokes the ghost of Charlotte Dymond to drive its narrative. Her monument features on the book's cover. An episode of Rick Stein's Cornwall features a visit to the memorial on Bodmin Moor.

== See also ==
- List of solved missing person cases (pre-1950)
