= Turfdown =

Hamlet in Cornwall, England

Coordinates: 50°27′45″N 4°41′05″W

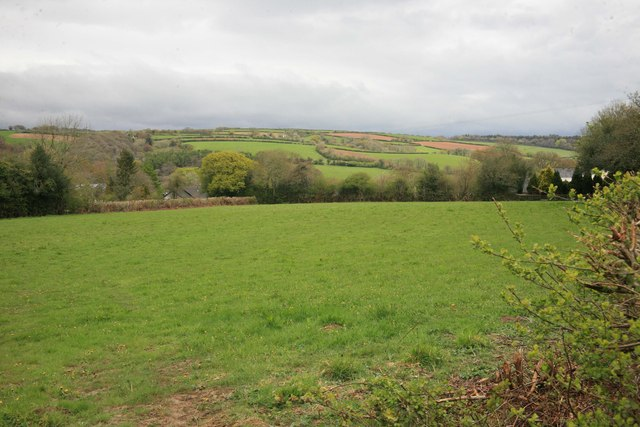
Turfdown fields

Turfdown is a hamlet east of Bodmin in Cornwall, England, United Kingdom.
