= Bodmin Friary =

Cornwall, UK Franciscan friary, 1230s-1530s

Coordinates: 50.479742°N 4.719631°W

Bodmin Friary was a Franciscan friary in Bodmin, Cornwall, England, UK. There are very few remains from the substantial Franciscan Friary established c. 1240: a gateway in Fore Street and two pillars elsewhere in the town.

The Franciscans arrived in Bodmin in the 1220s or 1230s and under the patronage of the Earl of Cornwall and other lords acting as trustees erected a fine, lofty church. By the time of the Dissolution of the Monasteries this church was full of tombs of distinguished Cornish people. It was 150 feet long and 60 feet high. In the reign of Henry VIII the friary was dispossessed and the church desecrated. It was converted into a market hall and assize hall and later fell into ruin. The last remains were removed in 1891.
