= William Robert Hicks =

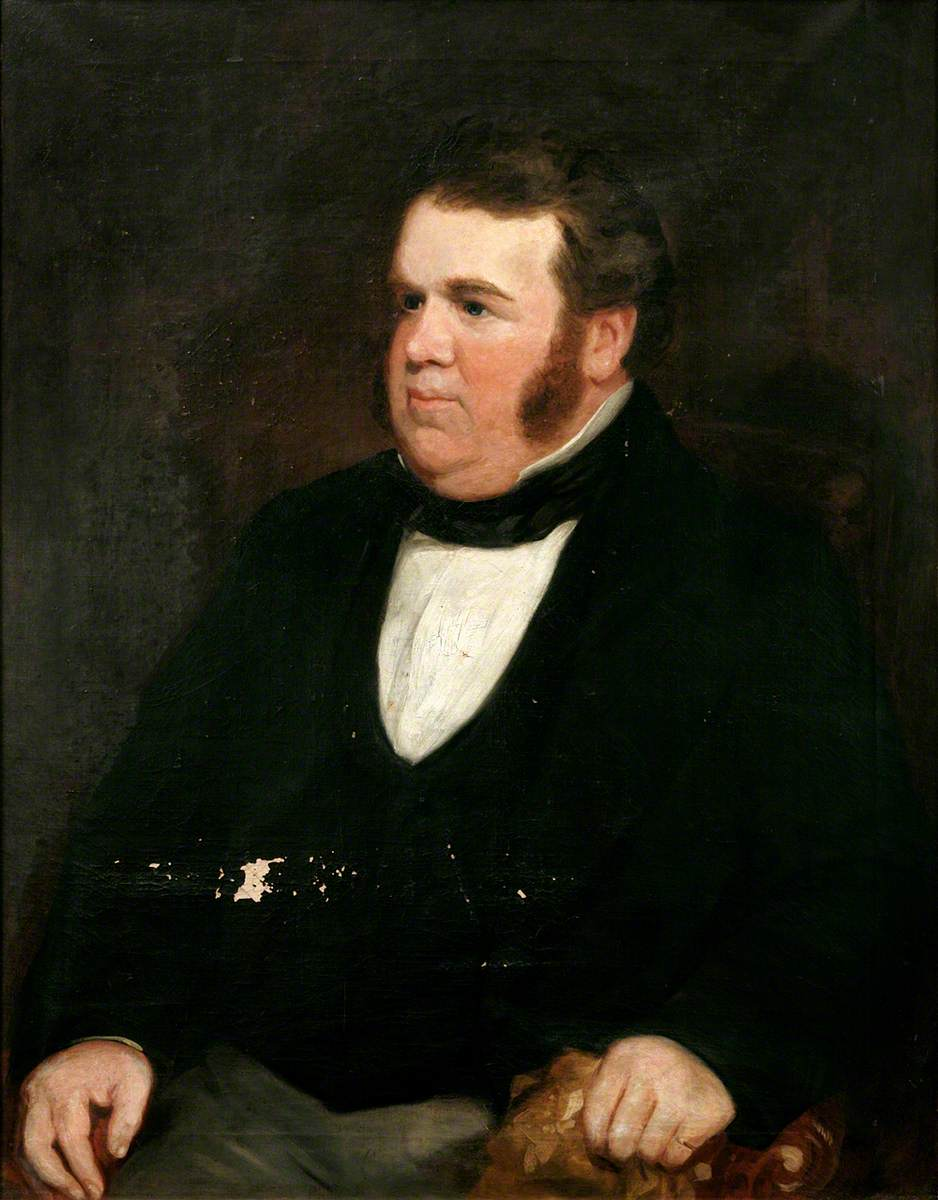
- Portrait of William Robert Hicks from 1865
- Born: 1808
- Died: 1868
- Occupation: asylum warden

William Robert Hicks (1808–1868) was a British asylum superintendent and well known humorist of the 19th century.

== Biography ==
Hicks, son of William Hicks, a schoolmaster, of Bodmin, Cornwall, who died 16 March 1833, by Sarah, daughter of William and Margaret Hicks, was born at Bodmin on 1 April 1808, and educated under his father until 1824, and then under a Mr. Harvey at Plymouth. From 1832 to 1840 he kept a boys' boarding-school in Honey Street and on the Castle Hill, Bodmin, and was noted for his extensive knowledge of mathematics. In 1834 he became clerk of the Bodmin board of guardians and superintendent-registrar.

=== Asylum superintendent ===
In 1840 Hicks was appointed domestic superintendent of the Cornwall County Lunatic Asylum, clerk of the asylum, and clerk to the committee of visitors at Bodmin, and soon after was also named clerk to the highway board. The Earl of Devon afterwards procured for him the additional situation of auditor of the metropolitan district asylums. When Hicks became connected with the Bodmin asylum he found the old system of management prevailing, and in conjunction with the medical superintendent introduced more humane modern methods. One patient who was chained in a dark cell as a dangerous lunatic turned out to be a wit and a philosopher. He was found to be harmless, and employed to take care of the pigs and do other useful work. In 1865–66 Hicks was mayor of Bodmin, when he revived the custom of beating the bounds of the town. He was—according to the Dictionary of National Biography—a good man of business. He printed Statistics respecting the Food supplied to Paupers in the Western Unions of Cornwall.

=== Humorist ===
Hicks was a witty speaker, and especially famous for telling a story. He was popular in the two western counties (Cornwall and Devon), and had an established reputation in London, being known as the "Yorick of the West". His memory was excellent, and he was an admirable mimic. Hicks's wit, musical talent, and good taste in art made him a favourite in society, especially in company with his old friend George Wightwick, architect. They were frequent visitors of Sir William Molesworth at Pencarrow, near Bodmin. Many of his narratives were in the Cornish dialect, but he was equally good in the Devonshire, as well as in the peculiar talk of the miners. Among his best-known stories were the "Coach Wheel", the "Rheumatic Old Woman", "William Rabley", the "Two Deacons", the "Bed of Saltram", the "Blind Man, his Wife, and his dog Lion", the "Gallant Volunteer", and the "Dead March in Saul". His most famous story, the "Jury", referred to the trial at Launceston in 1817 of Robert Sawle Donnall for poisoning his mother-in-law, when the prisoner was acquitted. Each of the jurors gave a different and ludicrous reason for his verdict.

=== Retirement and death ===
On 31 December 1860 Hicks resigned his connection with the lunatic asylum, retiring on a full pension. He died at Westheath (a residence which he himself had built), Bodmin, on 5 September 1868 and was buried at Bodmin cemetery on 9 September. His wife, whom he married in 1834, was Elizabeth, daughter of George Squire of Stoke Damerel, Devonshire; she remarried in 1876 J. Massey.
