= Shire Hall, Bodmin =

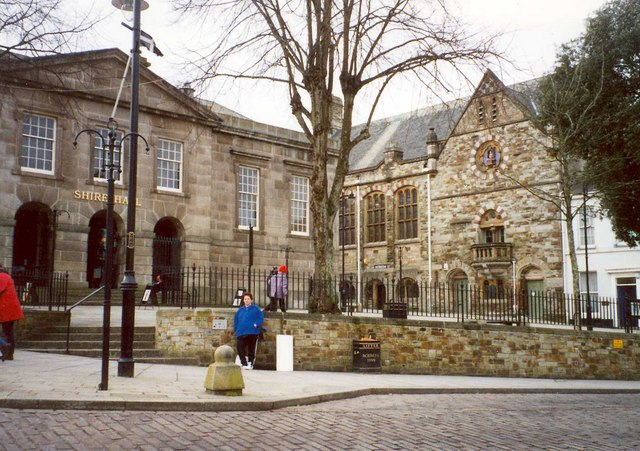
- Shire Hall, Bodmin

- Location within Cornwall
- 50.4704°N 4.7189°W
- Location: Bodmin, Cornwall

History
- Built: 1838

Site notes
- Architect: Henry Burt
- Architectural style: Neoclassical style

Listed Building – Grade II*
- Official name: Shire Hall
- Designated: 26 March 1949
- Reference no.: 1025049

Shire Hall is a former judicial facility at Mount Folly Square in Bodmin, Cornwall. It was the main courthouse in Cornwall from 1838 to 1988. It is a Grade II* listed building.

== History ==
The county assizes had been held in Launceston since 1201, latterly in the old guildhall in the town centre which had been built in 1647. However, with the completion of Bodmin Jail in 1779, St Lawrence's Hospital in Bodmin in 1818 and Bodmin railway station in 1834, Bodmin was well on the way to establishing itself as the county town of Cornwall. In this context, the justices chose to confirm this arrangement by procuring a new shire hall, in which the assizes would be held, in Bodmin: the site selected had previously been occupied by the medieval Franciscan Friary of St Nicholas.

The new shire hall was designed by Henry Burt of Launceston in a neoclassical style and completed in 1838. The design involved a symmetrical main frontage with seven bays facing onto Mount Folly Square; the central section of three bays, which slightly projected forward, featured three round-headed archways on the ground floor and three sash windows on the first floor; a flagpole projected above the central window and there was a pediment above. Internally, there were two principal courtrooms (the nisi prius court and the crown court).

The shire hall was the venue for the trial and conviction of the servant, Matthew Weeks, for the murder of his former girlfriend, Charlotte Dymond, on Rough Tor in April 1844. Dymond's story was subsequently immortalised in a poem by the Cornish writer, Charles Causley as well as by a granite pillar which was paid for by public subscription and erected on the Tor in the mid-19th century. It was also the venue for the trial and conviction of Dennis Whitty and Russell Pascoe, two of the last people to be executed in the UK, for the murder of a Cornish farmer, William Garfield Rowe, in August 1963.

After the courts moved to a modern court complex in Edward Street in Truro, the shire hall closed as a courthouse in September 1988. It was refurbished with financial support from North Cornwall District Council, the Heritage Lottery Fund and English Heritage in the late 1990s and was re-opened by Queen Elizabeth II as a visitor attraction on 8 June 2000. One of the courts was restored to its original condition and the other court was converted to serve as a Visitor Information Centre.
