= St Lawrence's Hospital, Bodmin =

St Lawrence's Hospital
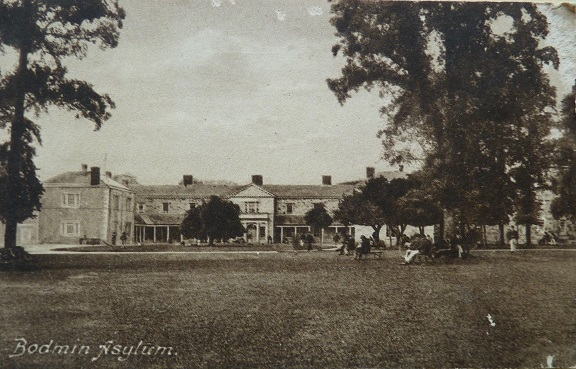
- Bodmin Asylum in the early 20th century

- Shown in Cornwall

Geography
- Location: Bodmin, Cornwall, England
- Coordinates: 50.4693°N 4.7382°W

Organisation
- Care system: NHS
- Type: Mental health

History
- Founded: 1818
- Closed: 2002

Links
- Lists: Hospitals in England

Listed Building – Grade II*
- Official name: Former St Lawrence's Hospital
- Designated: 8 June 1972
- Reference no.: 1195283

St Lawrence's Hospital was a mental hospital in Bodmin, Cornwall, England, UK. Part of the hospital has been converted to residential accommodation and the remainder has been demolished. It is a Grade II* listed building.

== History ==
=== Origins ===
St Lawrence's Hospital was originally built as the Cornwall County Asylum in 1818 to the design of architect John Foulston in the form of a star-shaped building with a central block and radiating wings. It was designed to deal with the problem of housing the insane poor and inmate conditions were notoriously bad. The humorist, William Robert Hicks, became domestic superintendent in the 1840s.

Cornwall County Lunatic Asylum (Supply of Water) Act 1866
- Act of Parliament
- Parliament of the United Kingdom
- Long title: An Act to authorize the Construction of Waterworks for the Supply of Water to the Lunatic Asylum for the County of Cornwall situate at Bodmin in the said County; and for other Purposes connected therewith.
- Citation: 29 & 30 Vict. c. viii

Dates
- Royal assent: 18 May 1866

It was extended in 1844 by the construction of the three-storey "High Building", demolished in 1964, and again in 1849 by the construction of Williams House, which was converted into apartments in 2004. A third extension, built in 1860, was known as the Carew building after Reginald Pole Carew, a local politician. A fourth extension, built in 1870, was known as the Long Building (later the Kendall Building) and was also demolished after it burned down in 1905. The foundation stone for a new building, constructed at a cost of £12,000, was laid by Sir William Wallace Rhoderic Onslow, Bt on 28 August 1882. The architect was a Mr Hine.

In 1840 William Robert Hicks was appointed domestic superintendent of the Cornwall County Lunatic Asylum, clerk of the asylum, and clerk to the committee of visitors at Bodmin, and soon after was also named clerk to the highway board. The Earl of Devon afterwards procured for him the additional situation of auditor of the metropolitan district asylums. When Hicks became connected with the Bodmin asylum he found the old system of management prevailing, and in conjunction with the medical superintendent introduced more humane modern methods. One patient who was chained in a dark cell as a dangerous lunatic turned out to be a wit and a philosopher; he was found to be harmless and employed to take care of the pigs and do other useful work. Hicks was—according to the Dictionary of National Biography—a very good man of business. He printed Statistics respecting the Food supplied to Paupers in the Western Unions of Cornwall.

=== Expansion ===
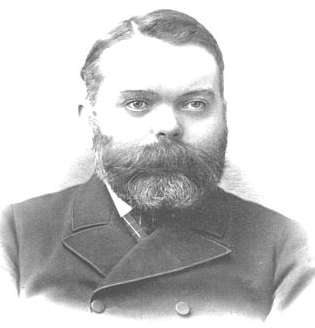
Silvanus Trevail, architect (1851–1903)

A completely new building to stand to the west of the first was designed in 1901 by Silvanus Trevail (1851–1903), one of Cornwall's best-known architects. The building was not completed until 1906, three years after the architect's death. Described by Trevail's biographer as "one of his finest achievements", it was built in the Edwardian Baroque style.

The National Asylum Workers' Union organised a strike of female employees at the hospital in 1918. The whole complex was renamed the St Lawrence's Hospital when it joined the National Health Service in 1948.

=== Post war ===
This was one of the hospitals investigated in 1967 as a result of the publication of Barbara Robb's book Sans Everything. Evidence was given by a nursing assistant: "When I was new on my ward, and not been issued with a uniform, one old lady said to me ‘You aren’t a nurse, dear; you can’t be. You don’t hit us or shout at us’. Another said ‘No-one smiles here. We are no good in here; useless, bloody wets’".

After the introduction of Care in the Community in the early 1980s the hospital went into a period of decline and finally closed in 2002. The former hospital's owners, Community First Cornwall, wished to demolish the Foster building to clear the site. Despite local support for its preservation, English Heritage declined a request to list the building on the grounds of insufficient reason. In May 2013 Cornwall Council decided that the demolition of the building did not require an environmental impact assessment, removing one of the last remaining obstacles to its removal. Although the Foster Hall Revival Trust began a campaign aimed at preserving the building and proposing alternatives to demolition, demolition started in September 2013.
