= Bodmin manumissions =

The Bodmin manumissions are records included in a manuscript Gospel book, the Bodmin Gospels or St Petroc Gospels, British Library, Add MS 9381. The manuscript is mostly in Latin, but with elements in Old English and the earliest written examples of the Cornish language, which is thus of particular interest to language scholars and early Cornish historians. The manuscript was discovered by Thomas Rodd (1796–1849), a London bookseller, and sold by him to the British Museum in May 1833 being now part of the British Library's collection. It is thought to have been made in Brittany - now part of France - and dates from the last quarter of the 9th century to 1st quarter of the 11th century.

== Cornish Glosses ==
Recorded in the Old Cornish language, in the margins of a Gospel book, are the names and details of slaves freed in Bodmin (the then principal town of Cornwall, an important religious centre) during the 9th or 10th centuries. There is also an Old Cornish Vocabulary, an English – Latin vocabulary from around AD 1000 to which was added about a century later a Cornish translation. Some 961 Cornish words are recorded, ranging from celestial bodies, through church and craft occupations, to plants and animals.

This, it is believed, is the only original record relating to Cornwall, or its Bishopric, which predates the Norman Conquest. The volume is in quarto, of rather an oblong form, and is very neatly written, though evidently by a scribe not well informed, or of great learning, even for those times. The entries seem to be contemporaneous with the manumissions which they record. The practice of manumitting slaves in the church, as recorded in the entries, appears to have existed from the early 4th century.
