= Bodmin College =

Academy school in Bodmin, England

Coordinates: 50.459°N 4.711°W

- Kolji Bosvena (Cornish)

Location
- Lostwithiel Road; Bodmin, Cornwall, PL31 1DD; England

Information
- Type: Comprehensive; Academy
- Established: 1870 as a college; 1 January 2011 as an academy
- Department for Education URN: 136383 Tables
- Ofsted: Reports
- Chair of Governors: Jason Coad
- Principal: Claire White
- Gender: Coeducational
- Age: 11 to 18
- Enrolment: 1,464 (333 Sixth Form)
- Colours: Black and White
- Website: www.bodmincollege.co.uk

Bodmin College (Cornish: Kolji Bosvena) is a English-language coeducational secondary academy school that serves the community of Bodmin, Cornwall, England. The college converted to an academy on 1 January 2011. In 2023 Bodmin College became part of the multi-academy trust CELT; the Cornwall Education Learning Trust. The predecessor school was Bodmin Community School (later Bodmin Community College) The latter was the result of a merger in 1973 between Bodmin Grammar School and Bodmin Secondary Modern. The grammar school was also known as the Harleigh School, being located in Harleigh Road. It was named Bodmin County School prior to 1945.

== Curriculum ==
In 2007, the college decided to change the GCSE curriculum by introducing a three-year course rather than the conventional two years. Students now choose their GCSE options in Year 8, and take end of year exams in the summer term of year 11. The first year of students to do this finished their GCSE course in the summer term of 2010. As of 2023, the school is currently in the process of reverting to a two-year course.

Bodmin College is also notable for having only three lessons per day, with each lasting 100 minutes, compared to the typical 4-6 lessons of most British schools. In 2023 it was announced that a 4-lesson schedule will replace the existing system in September 2023.

== Sixth form ==
The college has a sixth form college, catering for approximately 300 sixth form students.

The Sixth Form offers 26 A-Level courses, 17 BTEC/vocational courses, as well as Arts Awards, and Sports Academies in football, rugby, and netball. Some of the vocational courses, including beauty therapy, ICT practitioner, and construction, are based on a campus about 200m away.

== Higher education ==
Bodmin College recently began offering, at a separate site for vocational and higher studies, three degree-level courses in partnership with Falmouth University and Bodmin Town Council. These courses are Digital Media, Creative & Professional Writing, and Business Management.

A 2-year Digital Media foundation degree has been operational for a number of years, now with the option of an additional 1-year course to complete a BA (Hons).

== Robot Wars ==
In 1997 the college entered the BBC TV programme Robot Wars, with the robots Roadblock and Beast of Bodmin, winning Series 1 with Roadblock.

== School musical productions ==
In recent years the College has produced a musical production most years. They are collaborations between the Drama, Dance, Art, Textiles, and Music departments of the school. Productions include Avenue Q in 2015, The Lion King in 2016, Aladdin in 2017, Chicago in 2019, Mary Poppins in 2020, Ghost the Musical in 2022, Sister Act in 2023, and Frozen in 2024.

== Notable former pupils ==
- Lorna Dunkley, ABC News presenter
- Ross Green, actor
- Andy Reed, former rugby player for British Lions and Scotland
- Dan Rogerson, MP for North Cornwall from 2005 to 2015 and Cornwall councillor 2025 to present
