= Bodmin Riding =

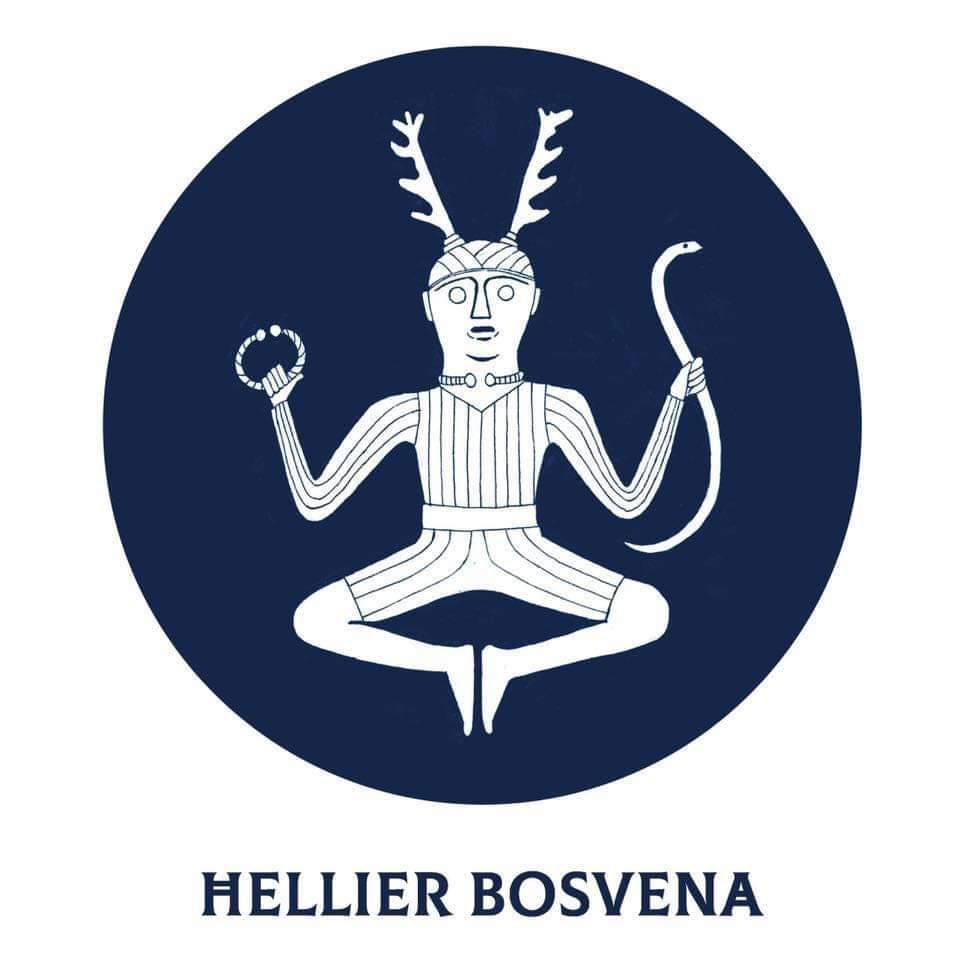
Hellier emblem created by Merran Coleman

The annual Bodmin Riding custom was held at Bodmin in Cornwall, England, UK, on the Sunday and Monday after 7 July (St Thomas Becket's Day). Accounts over its long history vary, but it involved a horseback procession around the town, carrying two large garlands, and probably originated as a Guild Riding custom. The earliest documentary evidence of the custom is in the Bodmin Parish Church rebuilding accounts of 1469–72, and it ceased in the early 19th century, but was revived in 1974 and now forms part of Bodmin Riding and Heritage Day Festival.

Cornish wrestling tournaments have always been an intrinsic part of Bodmin Riding. Historically, there were significant prizes.

Bodmin Riding may also refer to the folk song (also known as St Ives Well Procession) still played at the Riding.

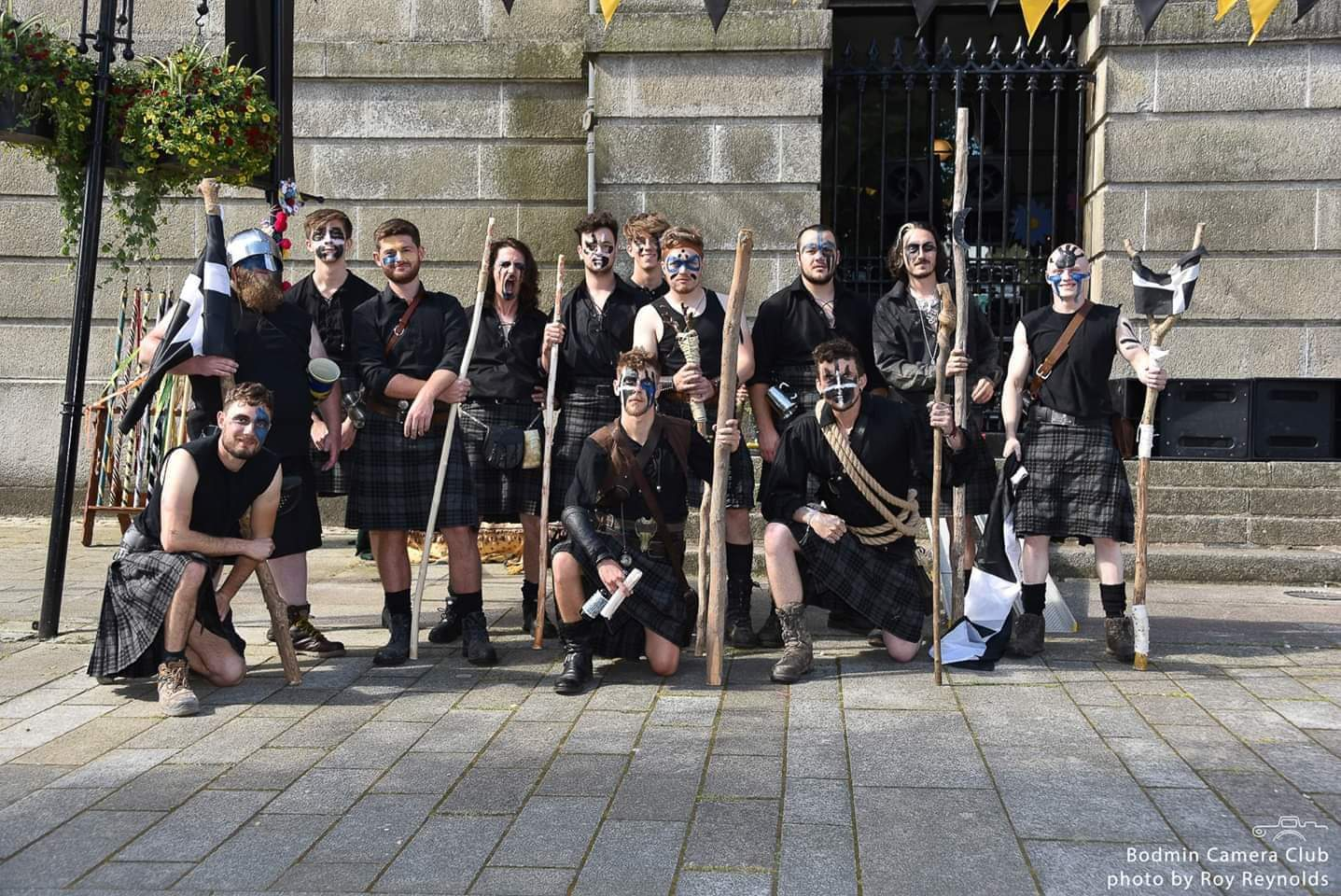
Helliers 2019

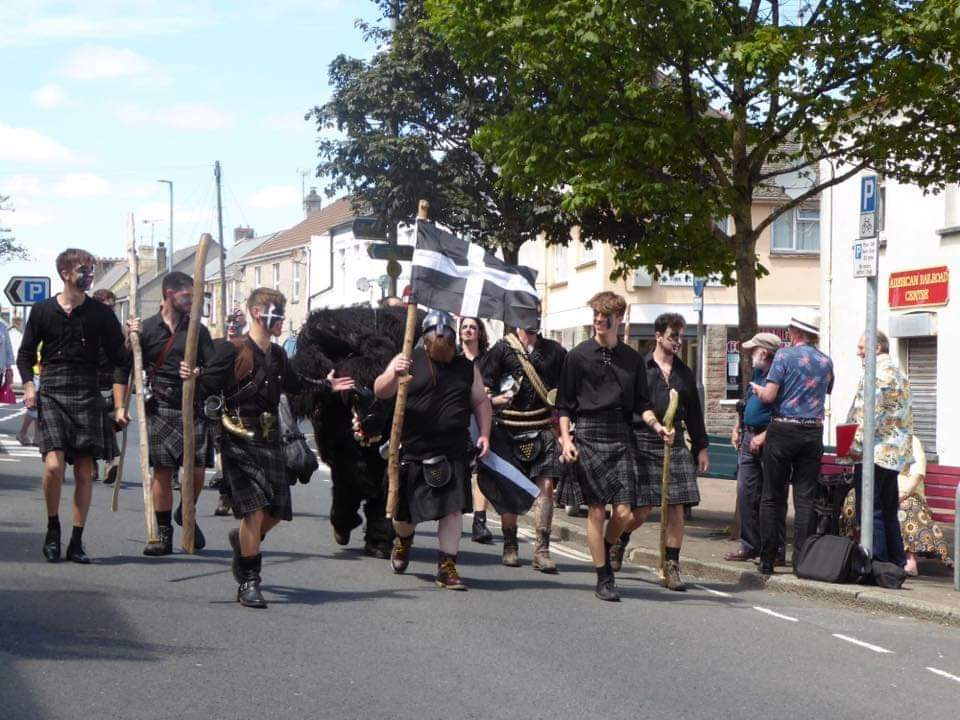
Helliers 2019

== Charles II ==
In July 1646, during the Wars of the Three Kingdoms, the Duke of Cornwall, the future Charles II, visited Bodmin on his way to the Isles of Scilly from whence he would go into exile. Whilst in Bodmin he joined in with the celebrations, described as sports and pastimes, and became a Brother of the Society.

== Helliers ==
=== 2019 Helliers ===
- David Anthony
- Dan Coad
- Tom Coleman
- Merran Coleman
- Jordan Collins
- George Featherston
- Harry Featherston
- Tom Kenyon
- Jacob Price
- Tom Price
- Rikky Sweet
- Kyle Sykes
- Benjamin Watts
