= Bodmin =

Town in east-central Cornwall, England

Coordinates: 50.466°N 4.718°W

Bodmin: Cornish: Bosvena
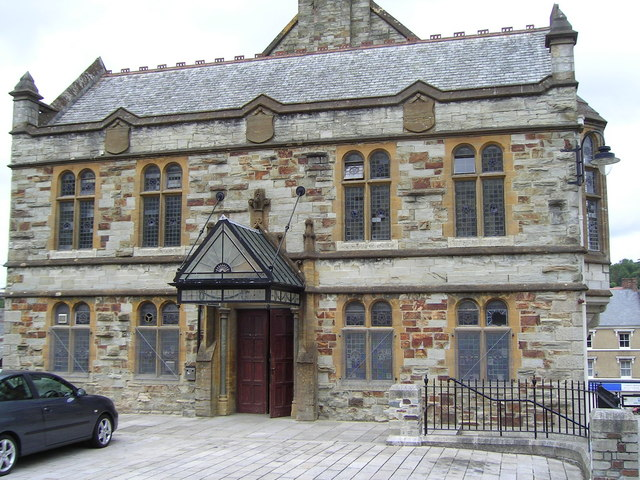
- Bodmin Public Rooms (Capitol Cinema)

- Location within Cornwall
- Population: 16,909 (Parish, 2021)
- Demonym: Bodminite
- OS grid reference: SX071665
- Civil parish: Bodmin
- Unitary authority: Cornwall
- Ceremonial county: Cornwall
- Region: South West
- Country: England
- Sovereign state: United Kingdom
- Post town: BODMIN
- Postcode district: PL31
- Dialling code: 01208
- Police: Devon and Cornwall
- Fire: Cornwall
- Ambulance: South Western
- UK Parliament: North Cornwall

Bodmin (Cornish: Bosvena [bɔzˈvɛnə]) is a town and civil parish in Cornwall, England, United Kingdom. It is situated south-west of Bodmin Moor.

The extent of the civil parish corresponds fairly closely to that of the town so is mostly urban in character. It is bordered to the east by Cardinham parish, to the southeast by Lanhydrock parish, to the southwest and west by Lanivet parish, and to the north by Helland parish. At the 2021 census the population of the parish was 16,909.

Bodmin became the county town of Cornwall in 1838 when the main courts for the county moved there from Launceston. Bodmin gradually lost county town functions to Truro; in 1889 the new Cornwall County Council chose to base itself in Truro, and the county's main courthouse moved to Truro in 1988.

== Situation and origin of the name ==
The name of the town probably derives from the Cornish "Bod-meneghy", meaning "dwelling of or by the sanctuary of monks". Variant spellings recorded include Botmenei in 1100, Bodmen in 1253, Bodman in 1377 and Bodmyn in 1522. The Bodman spelling also appears in sources and maps from the 16th and 17th centuries, most notably in the celebrated map of Cornwall produced by John Speed but actually engraved by the Dutch cartographer Jodocus Hondius the Elder (1563–1612) in Amsterdam in 1610 (published in London by Sudbury and Humble in 1626).

The hamlets of Cooksland, Little Kirland, Dunmere and Turfdown are in the parish.

== History ==
St. Petroc founded a monastery in Bodmin in the 6th century and gave the town its alternative name of Petrockstow. The monastery was deprived of some of its lands at the Norman Conquest but at the time of Domesday still held eighteen manors, including Bodmin, Padstow and Rialton. Bodmin is one of the oldest towns in Cornwall, and the only large Cornish settlement recorded in the Domesday Book in 1086. In the 15th century the Norman church of St Petroc was largely rebuilt and stands as one of the largest churches in Cornwall (the largest after the cathedral at Truro). Also built at that time was an abbey of canons regular, now mostly ruined. For most of Bodmin's history, the tin industry was a mainstay of the economy.

An inscription on a stone built into the wall of a summer house in Lancarffe furnishes proof of a settlement in Bodmin in the early Middle Ages. It is a memorial to one "Duno[.]atus son of Me[.]cagnus" and has been dated from the 6th to 8th centuries.

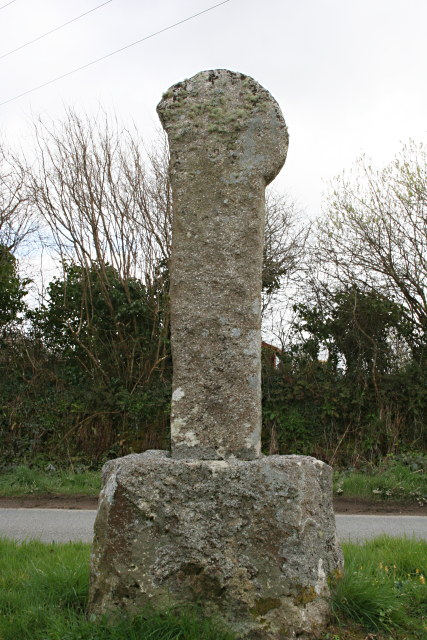
A Cornish cross on Old Callywith Road

Arthur Langdon (1896) records three Cornish crosses at Bodmin; one was near the Berry Tower, one was outside Bodmin Gaol and another was in a field near Castle Street Hill. There is also Carminow Cross at a road junction southeast of the town.

The Black Death killed half of Bodmin's population in the mid 14th century (1,500 people).

=== Rebellions ===
Bodmin was the centre of three Cornish uprisings. The first was the Cornish Rebellion of 1497 when a Cornish army, led by Michael An Gof, a blacksmith from St. Keverne and Thomas Flamank, a lawyer from Bodmin, marched to Blackheath in London where they were eventually defeated by 10,000 men of the King's army under Baron Daubeny. Then, in the autumn of 1497, Perkin Warbeck tried to usurp the throne from Henry VII. Warbeck was proclaimed King Richard IV in Bodmin but Henry had little difficulty crushing the uprising. In 1549, Cornishmen, allied with other rebels in neighbouring Devon, rose once again in rebellion when the staunchly Protestant Edward VI tried to impose a new Prayer Book. The lower classes of Cornwall and Devon were still strongly attached to the Roman Catholic religion and again a Cornish army was formed in Bodmin which marched across the border into Devon to lay siege to Exeter. This became known as the Prayer Book Rebellion. Proposals to translate the Prayer Book into Cornish were suppressed and in total 4,000 people were killed in the rebellion.

=== "Bodmin Town" ===
The song "Bodmin Town" was collected from the Cornishman William Nichols at Whitchurch, Devon, in 1891 by Sabine Baring-Gould who published a version in his A Garland of Country Song (1924).

== Governance ==
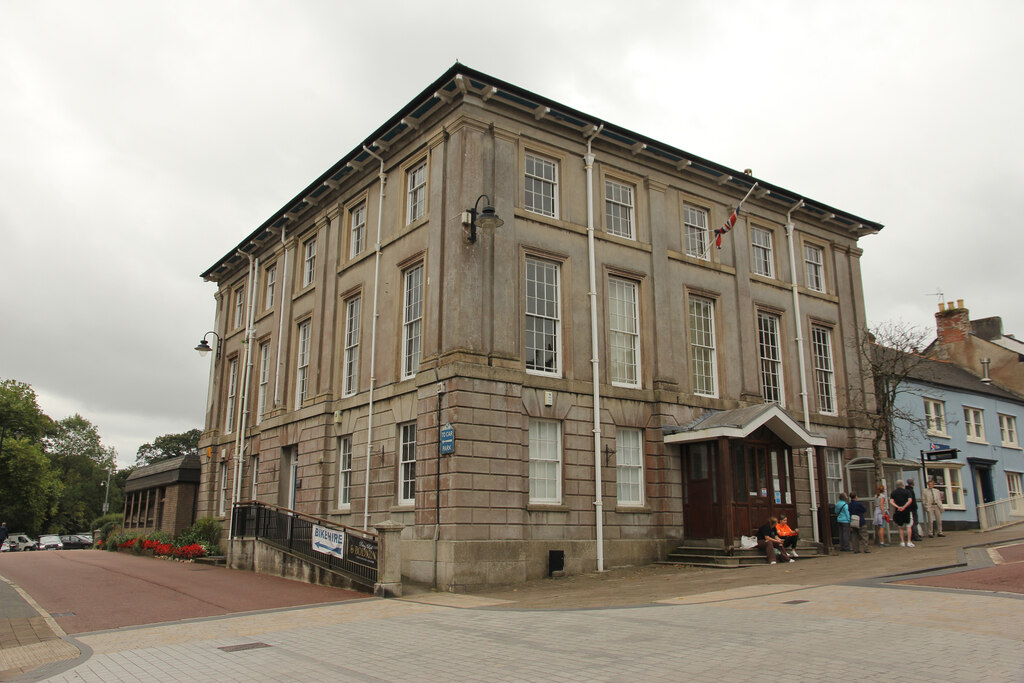
Shire House, Mount Folly: Town Council's offices

There are two tiers of local government covering Bodmin, at parish (town) and unitary authority level: Bodmin Town Council and Cornwall Council. The town council is based at the Shire House on Mount Folly, which had been built around 1840 as lodgings for visiting judges hearing cases at the Shire Hall on the opposite side of the road.

Bodmin Town Council is made up of sixteen councillors who are elected to serve a term of four years. Each year, the council elects one of its number as mayor to serve as the town's civic leader and to chair council meetings.

The town is part of the North Cornwall parliamentary constituency, which is represented by Ben Maguire MP.

=== Administrative history ===
Bodmin was an ancient parish. As well as the town itself, the parish also covered surrounding rural areas, particularly to the west and north of the town. Bodmin was also an ancient borough, being described as a borough from at least the 12th century. It was a seigneurial borough controlled by St Petroc's Priory until the priory was dissolved in 1539. A new municipal charter was issued by Elizabeth I in 1563 incorporating the borough, granting it certain rights of self-government.

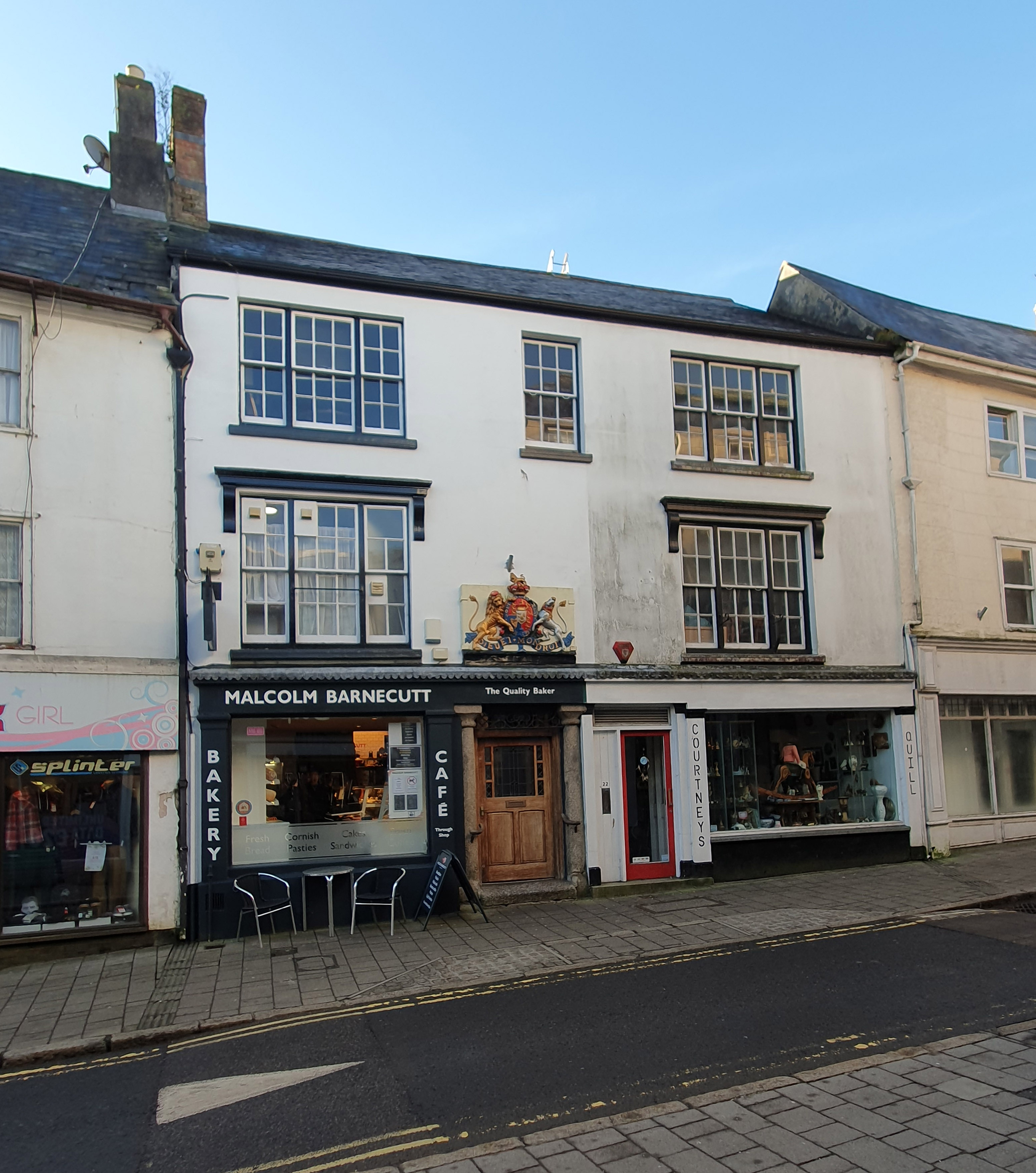
Bodmin Guildhall

The borough only covered the central part of the parish around the town itself. From the 17th century onwards, parishes were gradually given various civil functions under the poor laws, in addition to their original ecclesiastical functions. In some cases, including Bodmin, the civil functions were exercised by subdivisions of the parish rather than the parish as a whole. In Bodmin, poor law functions were administered separately for the areas inside and outside the borough boundary. In 1866, the legal definition of 'parish' was changed to be the areas used for administering the poor laws, and so the old parish was split into two civil parishes: 'Bodmin Borough' matching the borough, and 'Bodmin' covering the rural parts of the old parish outside the borough. The Bodmin parish was renamed 'Bodmin Rural' in 1934, and was abolished in 1939, when it was split between the neighbouring parishes of Helland to the north and Lanivet to the west.

In 1836, the borough was reformed to become a municipal borough under the Municipal Corporations Act 1835, which standardised how most boroughs operated across the country. The borough council met at Bodmin Guildhall on Fore Street, parts of which date back to the 17th century.

The borough was abolished in 1974 under the Local Government Act 1972, with district-level functions passing to the new North Cornwall District Council. A successor parish called Bodmin was created at the same time covering the area of the abolished borough, with its parish council taking the name Bodmin Town Council. North Cornwall was in turn abolished in 2009. Cornwall County Council then took on district-level functions, making it a unitary authority, and was renamed Cornwall Council.

=== Bodmin Borough Police ===
As part of being made a municipal borough in 1836, Bodmin was given its own police force, replacing the old system of parish constables. Bodmin Borough Police existed from 1836 to 1866. The creation of the Cornwall Constabulary in 1857 put pressure on smaller municipal police forces to merge with the county force. The two-man force of Bodmin came under threat almost immediately, but it would take until 1866 for terms of amalgamation to be agreed. After a public enquiry, the borough force was disbanded in January 1866 and policing of the borough was transferred to the county force.

=== County town ===
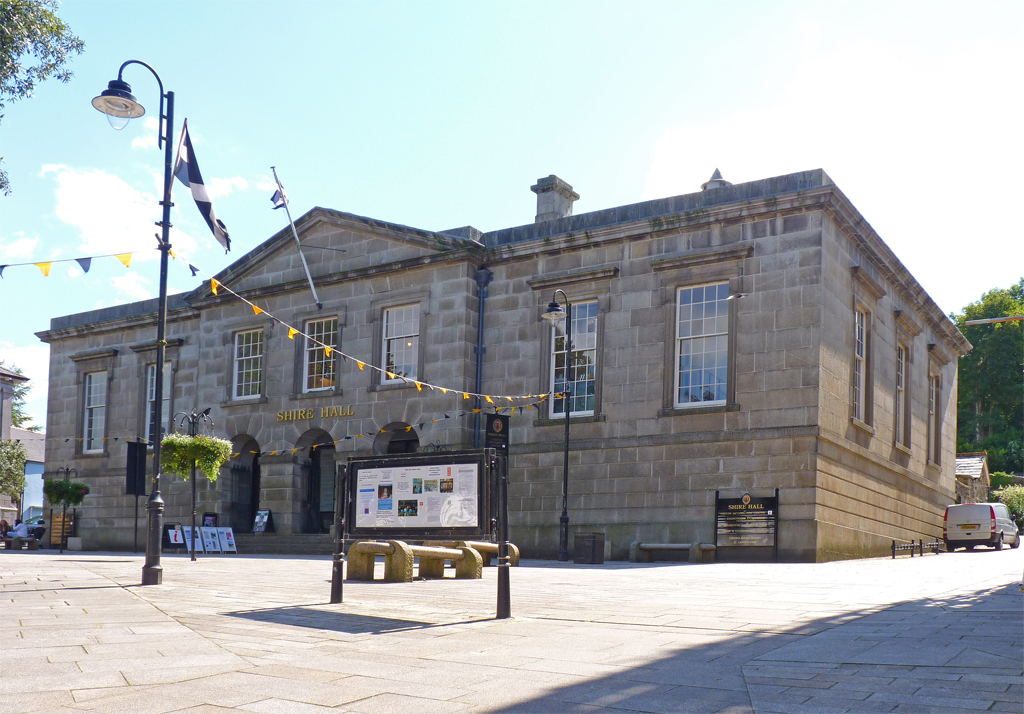
Shire Hall

The primary function of counties until the 19th century was the administration of justice. Cornwall's senior courts, the assizes, were generally held at Launceston until 1838. A new courthouse, Shire Hall, opened in Bodmin in 1838 for hosting the assizes and other courts. Bodmin was thereafter described as the county town rather than Launceston.

When county councils were established in 1889, Cornwall County Council chose to base itself in Truro rather than Bodmin. Truro therefore became the seat of local government for the county, but the county's assizes continued to be held at Shire Hall in Bodmin until assizes were abolished in 1972. Shire Hall continued to serve as a courthouse until 1988, when a new courthouse opened in Truro. Shire Hall was subsequently bought by the town council in 1994 and now serves as a visitor centre.

== Churches ==
=== Parish church of St Petroc ===
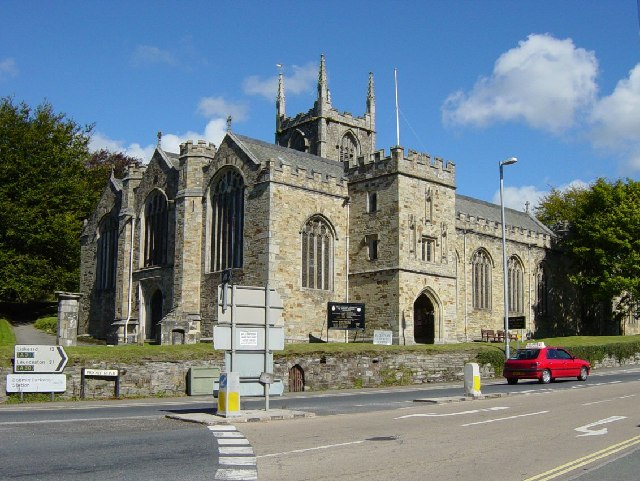
St Petroc's Church

Much of the existing church building dates from a reconstruction in 1469–72. The tower is older, being the main surviving part of the earlier Norman church; it stands on the north side of the church (the upper part is 15th-century). The tower formerly had a 150 feet (45 metres) high spire, but this was removed in 1699. St Petroc's was the largest church in Cornwall until Truro Cathedral was built in the late 19th century. The building underwent two Victorian restorations and another in 1930. It is now listed Grade I. There are a number of interesting monuments, most notably the black Delabole slate memorial to Richard Durant, his wives and twenty children, carved in low relief, and that of Prior Vivian which was formerly in the Priory Church (Thomas Vivian's effigy lying on a chest, all in black Catacleuse stone). There is also a twelfth-century ivory casket which is thought to have once contained relics of St Petroc. The font of a type common in Cornwall is of the 12th century: large and finely carved in elvan.

=== Other churches ===
The Chapel of St Thomas Becket is a ruin of a 14th-century building in Bodmin churchyard. The holy well of St Guron is a small stone building at the churchyard gate. The Berry Tower is all that remains of the former church of the Holy Rood and there are even fewer remains from the substantial Franciscan Friary established ca. 1240: a gateway in Fore Street and two pillars elsewhere in the town. The Roman Catholic Abbey of St Mary and St Petroc, formerly belonging to the Canons Regular of the Lateran was built in 1965 next to the already existing seminary. The Roman Catholic parish of Bodmin includes a large area of North Cornwall and there are churches also at Wadebridge, Padstow and Tintagel (St Paul's Church, Tintagel). In 1881 the Roman Catholic mass was celebrated in Bodmin for the first time since 1539. A church was planned in the 1930s but delayed by the Second World War: the Church of St Mary and St Petroc was eventually consecrated in 1965: it was built next to the already existing seminary. There are also five other churches in Bodmin, including a Methodist church.

=== Archdeaconry of Bodmin ===
The archdeaconry of Bodmin is one of the two principal divisions of the Anglican Diocese of Truro and covers its eastern parts.

== Sites of interest ==
=== Bodmin Jail ===
Bodmin Jail, operational for over 150 years but now a semi-ruin, was built in the late 18th century, and was the first British prison to hold prisoners in separate cells (though often up to ten at a time) rather than communally. Over fifty prisoners condemned at the Bodmin Assize Court were hanged at the prison. It was also used for temporarily holding prisoners sentenced to transportation, awaiting transfer to the prison hulks lying in the highest navigable reaches of the River Fowey. Also, during 1918–19 in the First World War the prison held some material from Britain's Public Record Office, including the Domesday Book, but not the Crown Jewels as is commonly claimed: in World War II these were stored in Windsor Castle.

=== Institutions ===
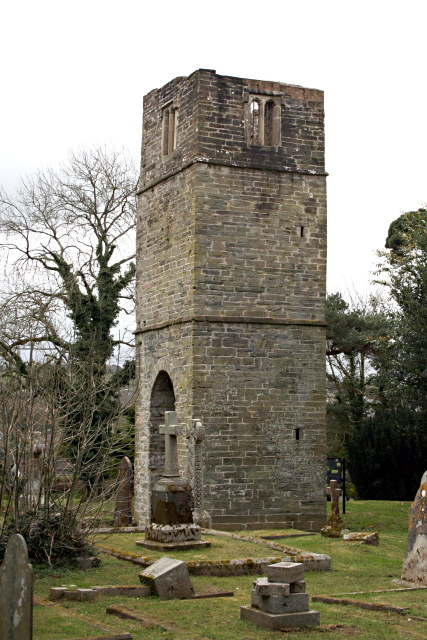
Berry Tower, all that remains of the Chapel of the Holy Rood

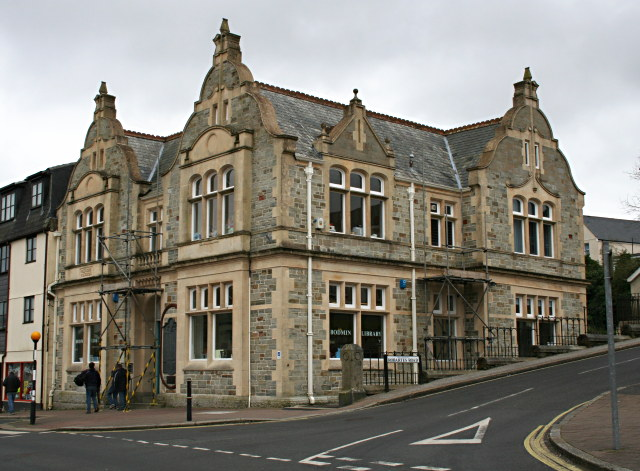
The former Bodmin Library, now an arts and community centre called intoBodmin

Victoria Barracks was formerly a depot of the now defunct Duke of Cornwall's Light Infantry and is now the site of the regimental museum. It includes the history of the regiment from 1702, plus a military library. The original barracks house the regimental museum which was founded in 1925. There is a fine collection of small arms and machine guns, plus maps, uniforms and paintings on display. The Honey Street drill hall was the mobilisation point for reservists being deployed to serve on the Western Front.

Bodmin County Lunatic Asylum, later known as St Lawrence's Hospital, was designed by John Foulston. The humorist, William Robert Hicks, was domestic superintendent in the mid-19th century.

Walker Lines, named after Lieutenant-General Harold Walker, was a Second World War camp built as an extension to the DCLI Barracks. It was used to harbour men evacuated from Dunkirk and later to house troops for the D-Day landings. In the 1950s it was the site of the JSSL. The site is now an industrial estate but still known as 'Walker Lines'.

Bosvenna House, an Edwardian manor house, was formerly Bosvenna Hotel, and the home of the Royal British Legion Club, but has since become a private residence.

There is a sizable single storey Masonic Hall in St Nicholas Street, which is home to no less than eight Masonic bodies.

== Other sites ==
Bodmin Beacon Local Nature Reserve is the hill overlooking the town. The reserve has 83 acres (33.6 ha) of public land and at its highest point it reaches 162 metres (531 ft) with the distinctive landmark at the summit. The 44 metres (144 ft) tall granite monument to Sir Walter Raleigh Gilbert was built in 1857 by the townspeople of Bodmin to honour the soldier's life and work in India.

In 1966, the "Finn VC Estate" was named in honour of Victoria Cross winner James Henry Finn who once lived in the town. An ornate granite drinking bowl which serves the needs of thirsty dogs at the entrance to Bodmin's Priory car park was donated by Prince Chula Chakrabongse of Thailand who lived at Tredethy.

== Education ==
There are no independent schools in the area.

=== Primary schools ===
Beacon ACE Academy opened as a primary school for pupils aged between 3–11 in September 2017, following the merger of Beacon Infant and Nursery School and Robartes Junior School. Beacon ACE Academy is part of Kernow Learning Multi Academy Trust and is rated Good by Ofsted. The school offers places for 420 pupils as well as 30 places within its Nursery and 10 places within its Area Resource Base for pupils with Special Educational Needs.

St Petroc's voluntary aided Church of England Primary School, Athelstan Park, Bodmin, was given this title in September 1990 after the amalgamation of St. Petroc's Infant School and St. Petroc's Junior School. St. Petroc's is a large school with some 440 pupils between the ages of four and 11. Eight of its fourteen governors are nominated by the Diocese of Truro or the Parochial Church Council of St. Petroc's, Bodmin. It is currently rated as "Requires Improvement" by Ofsted.

There are a further two primary schools within Bodmin; Berrycoombe School in the northwest corner of the town, and St. Mary's Catholic Primary School.

=== Bodmin College ===
Bodmin College is a large state comprehensive school for ages 11–18 on the outskirts of the town. The college is home to Bodmin College Jazz Orchestra. In 1997, Systems & Control students at Bodmin College constructed Roadblock, a robot which entered and won the first series of Robot Wars and was succeeded by "The Beast of Bodmin." The school also has one of the largest sixth forms in the county.

=== Callywith College ===
Callywith College is a further education college in Bodmin that opened in September 2017. A new-build college on a site close to the Asda supermarket, it will eventually cater for 1,280 students, with 197 staff employed. A total of 660 places were available in its first year. It is being created with the assistance of Truro and Penwith College to serve students aged 16–19 from Bodmin, North Cornwall and East Cornwall. It received the go-ahead in February 2016, funded as a Free School.

=== Army School of Education ===
Aspiring National Service Sergeant Instructors of the Royal Army Education Corps underwent training at the Army School of Education, situated at the end of the Second World War at Buchanan Castle, Drymen in Scotland, and later, from 1948, at the Walker Lines, Bodmin, until it moved to Wilton Park, Beaconsfield.

== Transport ==
Bodmin Parkway railway station – once known as Bodmin Road – is a principal calling point on the Cornish Main Line about 3.5 miles (5.6 km) south-east of the town centre. Buses to central Bodmin, Wadebridge, Padstow, Rock, Polzeath, Port Isaac and Camelford depart from outside the station entrance. It is connected to Bodmin town by a branch line that is home to the local steam railway, Bodmin and Wenford Railway.

Bodmin is just off the A30 providing a connection to the M5 motorway at Exeter, 62 miles (100 km) northeast.

Bus and coach services connect Bodmin with some other districts of Cornwall and Devon.

== Sport and leisure ==
Bodmin has a non-league football club Bodmin Town playing in the South West Peninsula League; a level 10 league in the English football league system. Their home ground is at Priory Park. Bodmin Rugby Club play rugby union at Clifden Parc and compete in the Tribute Cornwall/Devon league; a level 8 league in the English rugby union system.

The Royal Cornwall Golf Club (now defunct) was located on Bodmin Moor. It was founded in 1889 and became "Royal" in 1891. The club disbanded in the 1950s.

There is an active running club, Bodmin RoadRunners.

Bodmin was a stage finish in 2021 cycling Tour of Britain (Stage 1, 5 September).

=== Cornish wrestling ===
Bodmin has been a great centre for Cornish wrestling over the centuries. The Bodmin Wrestling Association was instrumental in the setting up of the Cornish Wrestling Association in 1923. At the base of the monument on The Beacon are the remains of the wrestling ring which many believe was a Plen-an-gwary. More recently Cornish wrestling tournaments are held as part of the revival of Bodmin Riding.

Other places in Bodmin where Cornish wrestling tournaments and matches were held include:

- Coldharbour near the Barracks
- Field at Barn Lane, opposite the Asylum Reservoir
- Field which adjoins St Nicholas opposite the Great Western Railway Station
- The Gymnasium at the DCLI Barracks
- Bodmin town's ground at Westheath
- The Football Ground, Priory Park
- Bodmin priory grounds, including the 1951 inter-Celtic tournament

William George Fish, known as "Billy the Fish", from Bodmin, was the featherweight champion in 1927 and 1928 and the lightweight champion in 1933 and 1934.

== Deprivation and crime ==
Some areas of the town have high levels of deprivation, and the proportion of children in poverty is higher than the average for Cornwall. The town is in the most deprived 20% on the Index of Multiple Deprivation, and a higher than average proportion of people living in the area have no qualifications.

Bodmin has problems with drug-dealing. It is part of the county lines drug trafficking network. Cuckooing is an issue locally.

== Media ==
Newspapers

Cornish Guardian is a weekly newspaper published every Wednesday in seven separate editions, including the Bodmin edition.

In October 2020, the Bodmin Voice, sister paper to the Newquay Voice, was launched.

Radio

Bodmin is the home of NCB Radio, an internet radio station which aims to bring a dedicated station to North Cornwall. The town is also served by county-wide radio stations, BBC Radio Cornwall, Heart West and Greatest Hits Radio South West.

Television

Local TV coverage is provided by BBC South West and ITV West Country. Television signals are received from the Caradon Hill and the local relay transmitters.

== Town twinning ==
Bodmin is twinned with Bederkesa in Germany; Grass Valley, in California, United States; and Le Relecq-Kerhuon (Ar Releg-Kerhuon in Brittany), France.

== Official heraldry ==
W. H. Pascoe's 1979 A Cornish Armory gives the arms of the priory and the monastery and the seal of the borough.

- Seal – a king enthroned; legend: Sigill comune burgensium bodmine
- Priory – Azure three salmon naiant in pale Argent
- Monastery – Or on a chevron Azure between three lion's heads Purpure three annulets Or

== Official events ==
On Halgavor Moor (Goats' Moor) near Bodmin there was once an annual carnival in July which was on one occasion attended by King Charles II. Halgavor extends into the parish of Lanhydrock.

The Cornish Games were once held on Halgavor Moor; the chief feature of these games was Cornish wrestling and Carew in his Survey (1602) gave an account of it. Bodmin Riding, a horseback procession through the town, is a traditional annual ceremony.

=== 'Beating the bounds' and 'hurling' ===
In 1865–66 William Robert Hicks was mayor of Bodmin, when he revived the custom of beating the bounds of the town. He was – according to the Dictionary of National Biography – a very good man of business. This still takes place more or less every five years and concludes with a game of Cornish hurling. Hurling survives as a traditional part of beating the bounds at Bodmin, commencing at the close of the 'Beat'. The game is organised by the Rotary club of Bodmin and was last played in 2015. The game is started by the Mayor of Bodmin by throwing a silver ball into a body of water known as the "Salting Pool". There are no teams and the hurl follows a set route. The aim is to carry the ball from the "Salting Pool" via the old A30, along Callywith Road, then through Castle Street, Church Square and Honey Street to finish at the Turret Clock in Fore Street. The participant carrying the ball when it reaches the turret clock will receive a £10 reward from the mayor.

In 2015, beating of the bounds and Cornish hurling took place at Bodmin 8 April organised by the Rotary club of Bodmin.

== Notable people ==
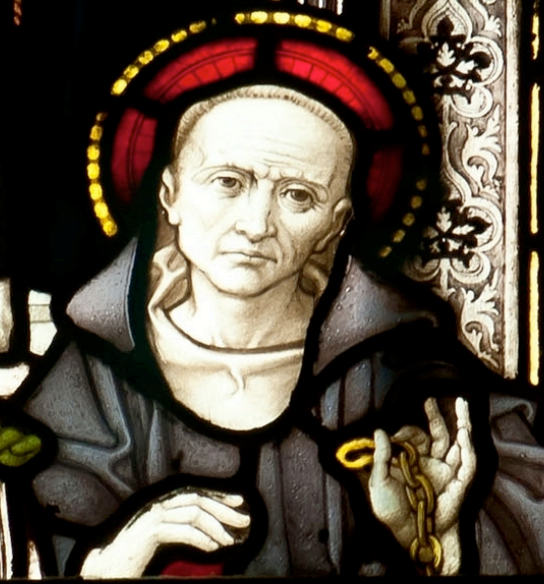
Saint Petroc stained glass window portrait

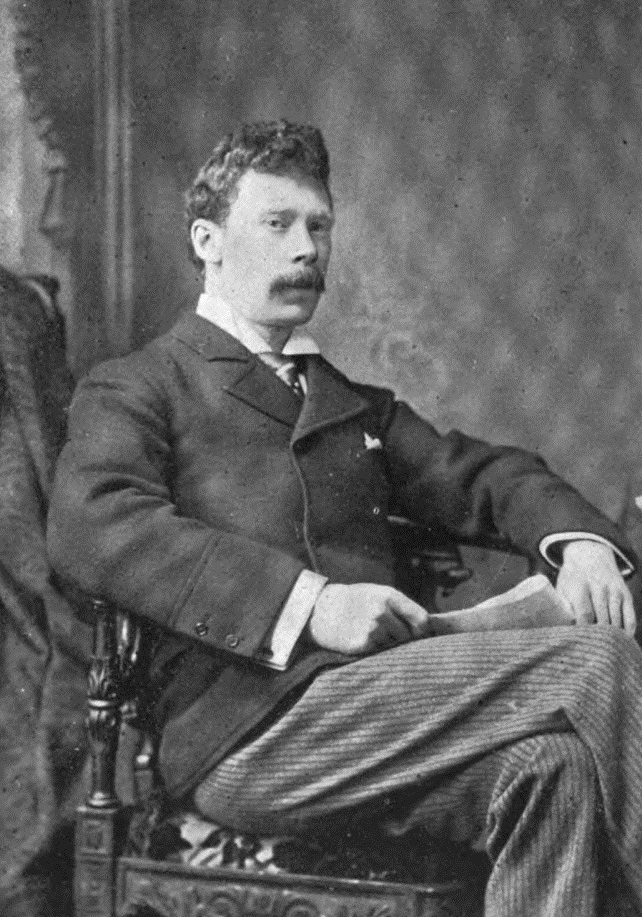
Arthur Quiller-Couch, before 1896

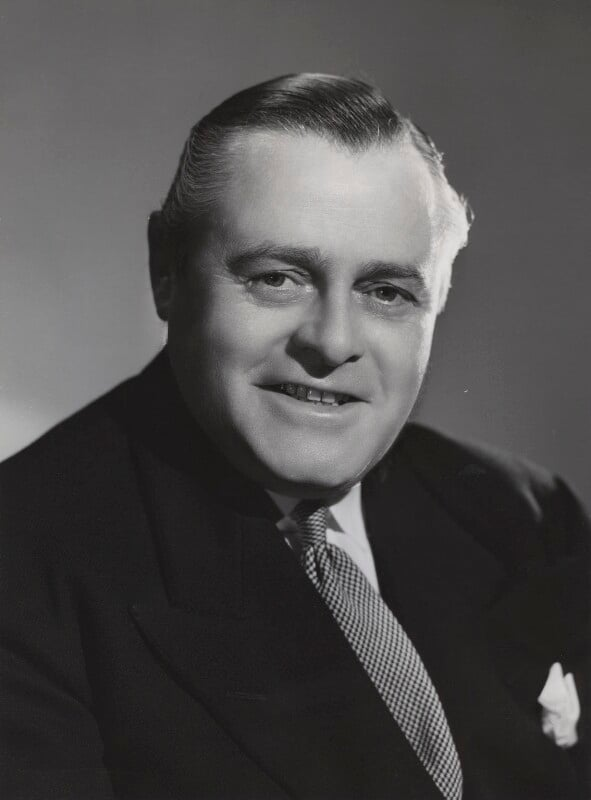
Sir Douglas Marshall, 1950

See also Category:People from Bodmin

- Saint Petroc (c. 468 – c. 564), a British prince and Christian saint
- Thomas Flamank (died 1497), a lawyer and former MP from Cornwall, who co-led the Cornish rebellion of 1497
- Thomas Vivian (c. 1500) or Vyvyan, Prior of Bodmin, titular Bishop of Megara
- John Cornelius (1557–1594), an Irish Catholic priest and Jesuit born in Cornwall, Catholic martyr, beatified in 1929
- John Arnold (1736–1799), an English watchmaker and inventor
- John Eyre (1754–1803), an English evangelical clergyman
- William Clift (1775–1849), a British illustrator and conservator
- Sir Walter Gilbert, 1st Baronet (1785–1853), an English army officer in the British East India Company
- William Robert Hicks, (1808–1868), asylum superintendent and public humorist
- John Dunn-Gardner (1811–1903), politician and landowner, local MP from 1841 to 1847
- Major-General Francis Hamley (1815–1876), British Army officer who administered the South Australian government from 1868 to 1869
- Sir John Coode (1816–1892), an English civil engineer, known for harbour works
- Major General Joseph Hamley (1820–1911), British Army officer who administered the New Zealand station of the British Army Military Store Department during the New Zealand Wars
- Lieutenant-General Sir Edward Hamley (1824–1893). a British general, military writer and politician.
- John Gale (1831–1929), an Australian newspaper proprietor, lay preacher and politician
- Leonard Courtney, 1st Baron Courtney of Penwith (1832–1918), politician, local MP from 1876 to 1885
- John Thomas Blight (1835–1911), a Cornish archaeological artist
- Sir E. A. Wallis Budge (1857–1934), an English Egyptologist, Orientalist, and philologist
- Henry Southwell (1860–1937), vicar of Bodmin, afterwards Bishop of Lewes, 1920 until 1926
- Sir Arthur Quiller-Couch (1863–1944), poet, novelist and critic
- Alice Hext (1865–1939), Cornish philanthropist, garden developer and magistrate
- Elizabeth Hurdon (1868–1941), British gynecologist and pathologist, the first gynecological pathologist
- George Herbert Pethybridge (1871–1948), British mycologist and phytopathologist (studied fungi and plant diseases)
- H. Stanley Allen (1873–1954), physicist from Cornwall noted as a pioneer in early X-ray research
- Sir Arthur Olver (1875–1961), British army officer and expert on animal husbandry
- Cyril McNeile (1888–1937), soldier and author, published as "Sapper"
- James Fynn (1893–1917), soldier, awarded the Victoria Cross for gallantry in Mesopotamia
- Commander Sir Douglas Marshall (1906–1976), businessman, politician, MP for Bodmin, 1945 to 1964.
- Chula Chakrabongse (1908–1963), Prince of Siam, lived and died locally, philanthropist
- Peter D. Mitchell (1920–1992), biochemist, 1978 Nobel Prize in Chemistry, spent the latter part of his career in Bodmin
- Peter Bessell (1921–1985), politician, and local MP from 1964 to 1970
- Al Hodge (1950–2006), former guitarist with the Cornish band The Onyx
- Dan Rogerson (born 1975), Cornish politician, MP for North Cornwall from 2005 to 2015

=== Sport ===
- Reggie Ingle (1903–1992), a cricketer who played 325 first-class cricket matches for Somerset
- Francis Gregory (1904–1983), Cornish wrestler of the 1920s and 1930s and a Cornish wrestling referee (stickler) of the 1960s
- Andy Reed (born 1969), rugby union player, played 108 games for Wasps RFC and 18 for Scotland
- Ben Oliver (born 1995), Cornwall County record holder for 100m and 400m Wheelchair racing, top ranked at 800 metres, European record holder.
- Rubin Wilson (born 2001), footballer who has played over 170 games, including 85 with Falmouth Town A.F.C.

== See also ==
- List of topics related to Cornwall
- List of Bodmin MPs
- Bodmin Friary
- Bodmin Hospital
- Bodmin manumissions
- Beast of Bodmin
- 2023 Bodmin mass stabbing
