= List of direct grant grammar schools =

This article lists the 179 direct grant grammar schools that existed in England and Wales between 1945 and 1976.

== Early departures from the scheme ==
A total of 164 schools were accepted onto the scheme when it opened in 1945. Of these, three schools were no longer on the list in 1965:

- Kensington High School closed its senior school in 1948, becoming Kensington Preparatory School.
- King Edward VI School, Southampton remained an LEA-maintained grammar school until it became independent in 1979.
- Magdalen College School, Brackley remained an LEA-maintained grammar school until it merged with Brackley High School and Brackley Secondary Modern School to form a comprehensive in 1973.

Five schools left the scheme between 1968 and 1974:

- Trinity School of John Whitgift (Church of England, Boys), Croydon became independent in 1968, but continued to take LEA-funded pupils.
- Oakham School (CE, Boys), Rutland became independent in 1970 and co-educational in the following year.
- Queen Victoria High School (Girls), Stockton-on-Tees merged with The Cleveland School in 1970, forming Teesside High School.
- St Joseph's Convent School (Roman Catholic, Girls), West Hartlepool merged into the new English Martyrs' Comprehensive School in 1973.
- Convent of Notre Dame High School for Girls (RC), Standishgate, Wigan closed in 1974.

== Schools remaining at the time of abolition ==
When the scheme was abolished in 1976, the remaining 174 schools either opted for independence or applied to join the state system, though some applications were refused. The following table gives the outcome for these schools since 1976. Starred names indicate the 18 schools that were added when the list was re-opened between 1958 and 1961.

| Prior to abolition in 1976 | | | | Abolition | Current | |
| LEA | School name | Faith | Gender | Outcome | Gender | Status |
|---|---|---|---|---|---|---|
| Avon | Bath High School for Girls | – | girls | ind. | girls | merged, GDST |
| Avon | Bristol Cathedral School | CE | boys | ind. | mixed | academy |
| Avon | Bristol Grammar School | – | boys | ind. | mixed | ind., HMC |
| Avon | King Edward's School, Bath | – | boys | ind. | mixed | ind., HMC |
| Avon | La Retraite High School, Bristol | RC | girls | refused | – | closed 1982 |
| Avon | Queen Elizabeth's Hospital School, Bristol | – | boys | ind. | boys | ind., HMC |
| Avon | Red Maids' School, Bristol | – | girls | ind. | girls | merged, ind., HMC, GDST |
| Avon | Redland High School for Girls, Bristol* | – | girls | ind. | girls | merged, ind., HMC, GDST |
| Avon | St Brendan's College, Bristol | RC | boys | state | mixed | sixth form |
| Bedfordshire | Bedford Modern School for Boys | – | boys | ind. | mixed | ind., HMC |
| Bedfordshire | Dame Alice Harpur School, Bedford | – | girls | ind. | girls | merged, ind. |
| Berkshire | The Abbey School, Reading | – | girls | ind. | girls | ind. |
| Bexley | St Joseph's Convent Grammar School* | RC | girls | refused | – | closed 1979 |
| Birmingham | King Edward VI High School for Girls | – | girls | ind. | girls | ind. |
| Birmingham | King Edward's School | – | boys | ind. | boys | ind., HMC |
| Bolton | Bolton School Boys Division | – | boys | ind. | boys | ind., HMC |
| Bolton | Bolton School Girls Division | – | girls | ind. | girls | ind. |
| Bolton | The Canon Slade Grammar School | CE | mixed | state | mixed | comp. |
| Bolton | Mount St Joseph School | RC | girls | state | mixed | comp. |
| Bolton | Thornleigh Salesian College | RC | boys | state | mixed | comp. |
| Bradford | Bradford Girls' Grammar School | – | girls | ind. | girls | academy |
| Bradford | Bradford Grammar School | – | boys | ind. | mixed | ind., HMC |
| Bradford | St Joseph's College | RC | girls | state | girls | comp. |
| Bromley | Bromley High School for Girls | – | girls | ind. | girls | ind., GDST |
| Bromley | Eltham College | – | boys | ind. | boys | ind., HMC |
| Bury | Bury Convent Grammar School | RC | girls | state | mixed | sixth form |
| Bury | Bury Grammar School for Boys | – | boys | ind. | boys | ind., HMC |
| Bury | Bury Grammar School for Girls | – | girls | ind. | girls | ind. |
| Cambridgeshire | Kimbolton School | – | boys | ind. | mixed | ind., HMC |
| Cambridgeshire | Perse School for Boys, Cambridge | – | boys | ind. | mixed | ind., HMC |
| Cambridgeshire | Perse School for Girls, Cambridge | – | girls | ind. | mixed | ind. |
| Cheshire | King's School, Chester | CE | boys | ind. | mixed | ind., HMC |
| Cheshire | Queen's School, Chester | CE | girls | ind. | girls | ind. |
| Cheshire | Ursuline Convent School, Chester | RC | girls | closed | – | – |
| Cornwall | Truro High School for Girls | – | girls | ind. | girls | ind. |
| Cornwall | Truro School | Meth | boys | ind. | mixed | ind., HMC |
| Coventry | Bablake School* | – | boys | ind. | mixed | ind., HMC |
| Coventry | King Henry VIII School* | – | boys | ind. | mixed | ind., HMC |
| Croydon | Croydon High School for Girls | – | girls | ind. | girls | ind., GDST |
| Croydon | Old Palace Girls' School, Croydon | – | girls | ind. | – | closed 2025 |
| Croydon | St Anne's College, Sanderstead | RC | girls | refused | – | closed 1979 |
| Devon | Edgehill Girls' College, Bideford | Meth | girls | ind. | mixed | merged, ind. |
| Devon | Exeter School | – | boys | ind. | mixed | ind., HMC |
| Devon | Maynard's Girls' School, Exeter | – | girls | ind. | girls | ind. |
| Devon | Notre Dame High School, Plymouth | RC | girls | state | girls | comp. |
| Devon | Plymouth College | – | boys | ind. | mixed | ind., HMC |
| Devon | St Boniface's College, Plymouth | RC | boys | state | boys | comp. |
| Devon | Shebbear College, Bearworthy | Meth | boys | ind. | mixed | ind. |
| Devon | West Buckland School, Barnstaple | CE | boys | ind. | mixed | ind., HMC |
| Dorset | Talbot Heath School, Bournemouth | – | girls | ind. | girls | ind. |
| Durham | Barnard Castle School | – | boys | ind. | mixed | ind., HMC |
| Ealing | Notting Hill and Ealing High School for Girls | – | girls | ind. | girls | ind., GDST |
| East Sussex | Brighton and Hove High School for Girls | – | girls | ind. | girls | ind., GDST |
| Essex | Brentwood School | CE | boys | ind. | mixed | ind., HMC |
| Essex | Ursuline Convent High School, Brentwood | RC | girls | state | girls | comp. |
| Gwent | Monmouth School for Boys | – | boys | ind. | mixed | ind., HMC |
| Gwent | Monmouth School for Girls | – | girls | ind. | mixed | ind., HMC |
| Gwynedd | Dr Williams School, Dolgellau | – | girls | closed | – | – |
| Hampshire | Portsmouth Grammar School | – | boys | ind. | mixed | ind., HMC |
| Hampshire | Portsmouth High School for Girls | – | girls | ind. | girls | ind., GDST |
| Hampshire | St Anne's Convent School, Southampton | RC | girls | state | girls | comp. |
| Hampshire | St John's College, Southsea* | RC | boys | refused | – | closed 2022 |
| Harrow | North London Collegiate School | – | girls | ind. | girls | ind. |
| Hereford and Worcester | Hereford Cathedral Grammar School | CE | boys | ind. | mixed | ind., HMC |
| Hereford and Worcester | King's School, Worcester | CE | boys | ind. | mixed | ind., HMC |
| Hertfordshire | Haberdashers' Aske's Girls' School, Elstree | – | girls | ind. | girls | ind. |
| Hertfordshire | Haberdashers' Aske's School, Elstree | – | boys | ind. | boys | ind., HMC |
| Hertfordshire | St Albans School | CE | boys | ind. | boys | ind., HMC |
| Humberside | Hymers College, Kingston-upon-Hull | – | boys | ind. | mixed | ind., HMC |
| Humberside | Pocklington School | – | boys | ind. | mixed | ind., HMC |
| Inner London | Alleyn's School* | – | boys | ind. | mixed | ind., HMC |
| Inner London | Blackheath High School for Girls | – | girls | ind. | girls | ind., GDST |
| Inner London | Latymer Upper School, Hammersmith | – | boys | ind. | mixed | ind., HMC |
| Inner London | Putney High School for Girls | – | girls | ind. | girls | ind., GDST |
| Inner London | South Hampstead High School for Girls | – | girls | ind. | girls | ind., GDST |
| Inner London | Streatham Hill and Clapham High School for Girls | – | girls | ind. | girls | ind., GDST |
| Inner London | Sydenham High School for Girls | – | girls | ind. | girls | ind., GDST |
| Kent | Kent College, Canterbury | Meth | boys | ind. | mixed | ind., HMC |
| Kent | Walthamstow Hall School, Sevenoaks | – | girls | ind. | girls | ind. |
| Kingston upon Thames | Kingston Grammar School | – | boys | ind. | mixed | ind., HMC |
| Lancashire | Arnold School, Blackpool | – | boys | ind. | mixed | ind., HMC |
| Lancashire | King Edward VII School, Lytham St Annes | – | boys | ind. | mixed | ind., HMC |
| Lancashire | Queen Mary School, Lytham St Annes | – | girls | ind. | mixed | ind., HMC |
| Lancashire | Lark Hill House School* | RC | girls | state | mixed | sixth form |
| Lancashire | Preston Catholic College* | RC | boys | state | mixed | sixth form |
| Lancashire | Winckley Square Convent School, Preston* | RC | girls | state | mixed | sixth form |
| Lancashire | Layton Hill Convent Grammar School, Blackpool | RC | girls | state | mixed | comp. |
| Lancashire | St Joseph's College, Blackpool | RC | boys | state | mixed | comp. |
| Lancashire | Notre Dame High School, Blackburn | RC | girls | state | mixed | merged |
| Lancashire | Paddock House Convent Grammar School, Accrington | RC | girls | state | mixed | merged |
| Lancashire | Queen Elizabeth's Grammar School, Blackburn* | – | boys | ind. | mixed | free school |
| Lancashire | St Mary's College, Blackburn | RC | boys | state | mixed | sixth form |
| Leeds | Leeds Girls High School* | – | girls | ind. | mixed | ind., HMC |
| Leeds | Leeds Grammar School* | – | boys | ind. | mixed | ind., HMC |
| Leeds | Notre Dame Grammar School | RC | girls | state | mixed | sixth form |
| Leeds | St Mary's College | RC | girls | state | mixed | comp. |
| Leeds | St Michael's College | RC | boys | state | mixed | comp. |
| Leeds | Woodhouse Grove School, Aireborough | Meth | boys | ind. | mixed | ind., HMC |
| Leicestershire | Loughborough Grammar School | – | boys | ind. | boys | ind., HMC |
| Leicestershire | Loughborough High School for Girls | – | girls | ind. | girls | ind. |
| Lincolnshire | Stamford High School* | – | girls | ind. | mixed | ind., HMC |
| Lincolnshire | Stamford School* | – | boys | ind. | mixed | ind., HMC |
| Liverpool | Bellerive Convent Grammar School | RC | girls | state | girls | comp. |
| Liverpool | Belvedere School for Girls | – | girls | ind. | girls | academy, GDST |
| Liverpool | Notre Dame Collegiate School | RC | girls | state | girls | comp. |
| Liverpool | St Edmund's College | CE | girls | state | girls | merged |
| Liverpool | St Edward's College | RC | boys | state | mixed | comp. |
| Liverpool | St Francis Xavier College | RC | boys | state | boys | comp. |
| Manchester | The Hollies Grammar School | RC | girls | state | – | closed 1985 |
| Manchester | Loreto High School | RC | girls | state | mixed | sixth form |
| Manchester | Manchester Grammar School | – | boys | ind. | boys | ind., HMC |
| Manchester | Manchester High School for Girls | – | girls | ind. | girls | ind. |
| Manchester | Notre Dame High School, Cheetham | RC | girls | state | – | closed 1997 |
| Manchester | St Bede's College | RC | boys | ind. | mixed | ind., HMC |
| Manchester | William Hulme Grammar School | – | boys | ind. | mixed | academy |
| Manchester | Withington Girls' School | – | girls | ind. | girls | ind. |
| Manchester | Xaverian College | RC | boys | state | mixed | sixth form |
| Merton | Wimbledon High School for Girls | – | girls | ind. | girls | ind., GDST |
| Newcastle upon Tyne | Central High School for Girls | – | girls | ind. | girls | ind., GDST |
| Newcastle upon Tyne | Convent of the Sacred Heart Grammar School | RC | girls | state | girls | comp. |
| Newcastle upon Tyne | Dame Allan's Boys School | – | boys | ind. | boys | ind., HMC |
| Newcastle upon Tyne | Dame Allan's Girls School | – | girls | ind. | girls | ind. |
| Newcastle upon Tyne | Royal Grammar School | – | boys | ind. | mixed | ind., HMC |
| Newcastle upon Tyne | St Cuthbert's Grammar School | RC | boys | state | boys | comp. |
| Norfolk | King Edward VI Grammar School, Norwich | – | boys | ind. | mixed | ind., HMC |
| Norfolk | Norwich High School for Girls | – | girls | ind. | mixed | ind., GDST |
| Norfolk | Notre Dame High School, Norwich | RC | girls | state | mixed | comp. |
| Northamptonshire | Northampton High School for Girls | – | girls | ind. | girls | ind., GDST |
| Northamptonshire | Notre Dame High School, Northampton | RC | girls | closed | – | – |
| North Yorkshire | Ashville College, Harrogate | – | boys | ind. | mixed | ind., HMC |
| North Yorkshire | The Bar Convent Grammar School, York | RC | girls | state | mixed | merged |
| North Yorkshire | Ladies of Mary, Scarborough | RC | girls | closed | – | – |
| Nottinghamshire | Nottingham High School for Girls | – | girls | ind. | girls | ind., GDST |
| Oldham | Hulme Grammar School for Boys* | – | boys | ind. | mixed | ind., HMC |
| Oldham | Hulme Grammar School for Girls* | – | girls | ind. | mixed | ind., HMC |
| Oxfordshire | Abingdon School | CE | boys | ind. | boys | ind., HMC |
| Oxfordshire | Magdalen College School, Oxford | – | boys | ind. | boys | ind., HMC |
| Oxfordshire | Oxford High School for Girls | – | girls | ind. | girls | ind., GDST |
| Oxfordshire | School of St Helen and St Katharine, Abingdon* | CE | girls | ind. | girls | ind. |
| Redbridge | Bancroft's School, Woodford | – | boys | ind. | mixed | ind., HMC |
| Redbridge | Ursuline High School, Ilford | RC | girls | state | girls | comp. |
| Salford | Adelphi House Grammar School | RC | girls | state | – | closed 1977 |
| Salford | De La Salle College | RC | boys | state | mixed | merged |
| Sefton | The Merchant Taylors' Boys' School, Crosby | – | boys | ind. | boys | ind., HMC |
| Sefton | The Merchant Taylors' School for Girls, Crosby | – | girls | ind. | girls | ind. |
| Sefton | St Mary's College, Crosby | RC | boys | ind. | mixed | ind., HMC |
| Sefton | Seafield Convent Grammar School, Sefton | RC | girls | state | mixed | merged |
| Sheffield | De La Salle College | RC | boys | state | mixed | merged |
| Sheffield | Notre Dame High School | RC | girls | state | mixed | comp. |
| Sheffield | Sheffield High School for Girls | – | girls | ind. | girls | ind., GDST |
| Shropshire | Shrewsbury High School for Girls | – | girls | ind. | girls | ind., GDST |
| Somerset | Wellington School | – | boys | refused | mixed | ind., HMC |
| South Glamorgan | Howell's School, Cardiff | – | girls | ind. | girls | ind., GDST |
| Staffordshire | St Dominic's High School, Stoke-on-Trent | RC | girls | state | – | closed |
| Staffordshire | St Joseph's College, Stoke-on-Trent | RC | boys | ind. | mixed | grammar |
| St Helens | Notre Dame High School | RC | girls | state | mixed | comp. |
| St Helens | West Park Grammar School | RC | boys | state | mixed | comp. |
| Stockport | Cheadle Hulme School | – | mixed | ind. | mixed | ind., HMC |
| Stockport | Stockport Grammar School | – | boys | ind. | mixed | ind., HMC |
| Suffolk | Culford School, Bury St Edmunds | Meth | boys | ind. | mixed | ind., HMC |
| Suffolk | Framlingham College | – | boys | ind. | mixed | ind., HMC |
| Suffolk | Ipswich High School for Girls | – | girls | ind. | girls | ind., GDST |
| Suffolk | Woodbridge School | – | boys | ind. | mixed | ind., HMC |
| Sunderland | St Anthony's School | RC | girls | state | girls | comp. |
| Surrey | Caterham School | – | boys | ind. | mixed | ind., HMC |
| Sutton | Sutton High School for Girls | – | girls | ind. | girls | ind., GDST |
| Wakefield | Queen Elizabeth Grammar School | – | boys | ind. | boys | ind., HMC |
| Wakefield | Wakefield Girls' High School | – | girls | ind. | girls | ind. |
| Warwickshire | The King's High School for Girls, Warwick* | – | girls | ind. | girls | ind. |
| Wiltshire | Dauntsey's School, West Lavington | – | boys | ind. | mixed | ind., HMC |
| Wirral | Birkenhead High School for Girls | – | girls | ind. | girls | academy, GDST |
| Wirral | Birkenhead School | – | boys | ind. | mixed | ind., HMC |
| Wirral | Holt Hill Convent School, Birkenhead | RC | girls | state | – | closed |
| Wirral | St Anselm's College, Birkenhead | RC | boys | ind. | boys | grammar |

Key:

GDST=Girls' Day School Trust

HMC=Headmasters' and Headmistresses' Conference
