= Benedict Southworth =

Benedict Southworth (born August 1965) is a social justice organiser / campaigner and strategist. He is known for his work as a campaign strategist for Greenpeace, Amnesty International and Friends of the Earth and reshaping not for profit operations. He is the former Chief Executive of the Ramblers and the World Development Movement (renamed Global Justice Now). Southworth was a founding board member of 38 Degrees and currently sits on the Board of its sister organisation 38 Degrees Trust.

The Ramblers is Britain's largest walking organisation. Under Southworth's leadership Ramblers took over the Walking for Health scheme from the Government, forming a partnership with Macmillan Cancer Support. They successfully defended the English coastal path and ran the Big Pathwatch the largest ever survey of rights of way in England and Wales.

Southworth became Chief Executive of the World Development Movement at the height of Make Poverty History. He was on the coordination team of Make Poverty History and was chair of the Trade Justice Movement. He played a critical role in explaining the decision to wind down the campaign to local activists.

Southworth was the Director of Greenpeace International's climate campaign launching the Stop Esso campaign and Amnesty International's global campaign program launching the Stop Violence Against Women campaign.

== Early life and education ==
Born in Preston Southworth was educated at Preston Catholic College and Cardinal Newman College. He graduated in Political Theory from University of Liverpool in 1987. Southworth has a MSc in the environmental and energy studies from the University of East London.

== Early career ==
On moving to London Southworth volunteered at Friends of the Earth before becoming a campaigner in its Industry and Pollution campaign. He was the link person between Friends of the Earth and direct action groups at the Newbury Bypass campaign in 1995/96.

== Australia ==
Southworth emigrated to Australia working for community legal centres in NSW before leading Greenpeace's campaign operations in Australia and the Pacific. He took part in the initial Mittagong Forum discussions and ran successful campaigns to get Coca-Cola to drop the use of HFC in their operations worldwide and Canadian energy company Suncor, to withdraw from their plans to extract oil from shale near the Great Barrier Reef.

== Personal life ==
His partner is Michaela O’Brien, who is a senior lecturer at the University of Westminster. She is the co-leader of the masters in Campaigning Media and Social Change.
