= Beth Hesmondhalgh =

British suffragette and hunger striker

- Other name: Elizabeth Ellen Hesmondhalgh
- Occupations: cotton spinner and suffragette
- Years active: 1907–1914
- Organization: Women's Social and Political Union
- Known for: militant suffrage activism
- Political party: Independent Labour Party
- Awards: Hunger Strike Medal

Elizabeth Ellen Hesmondhalgh (active 1907–1914) was a cotton spinner in Preston, and a British suffragette. She was imprisoned twice for militant protesting on behalf of women's franchise and was awarded the Women's Social and Political Union's (WSPU) Hunger Strike Medal for valour.

== Life and militant activism ==
Little is known about her early life. She became a cotton spinner around 1885 in Lancashire and married a railway signalman.

Hesmondhalgh was recruited as a member of the Preston branch of the Independent Labour Party, but was later banned for protesting when the MP Philip Snowden was speaking in the town, along with five other militant members of the Women's Social and Political Union.

She had joined the women's suffrage movement in 1907, with the encouragement of Edith Rigby, whom she met at the Independent Labour Party, and who was recruiting working women to the cause of women's suffrage from the local mills. Rigby had called her 'promising material', but persuading Hesmondhalgh had involved 'trying to get round her husband' who supported women's suffrage, despite the risks of arrest and loss of income and then 'sending Annie Kenney' a working class suffrage leader to persuade her to join the militant group.

Hesmondhalfh was reported as saying about her recruitment to WSPU:

"I joined half against my will and the next thing I knew I was asked to face imprisonment."

She also said that Rigby had a manner when she looked for volunteers for 'unpleasant or dangerous actions' ...of making you feel that she doing you a favour'. Meetings were held initially in Rigby's home at 28, Winkley Square, Avenham and chaired by Grace Alderman.

=== Activism and arrests ===
On 13 February 1907, Hesmondhalgh joined Rigby, Alderman, Rose Towler and the Pankhursts with a large WSPU contingent at the first 'Women's Parliament' in Caxton Hall, which marched and attempted to enter the House of Commons. Fifty-seven women were arrested and sent to Holloway Prison for a month. And another mass attempt to enter the Commons was made, with similar outcomes in 1908.

In 1909, she put up posters in Preston which called Asquith, the Prime Minister 'Mr Double-Face' but the homemade glue was ineffective, so she and others wrapped the posters around potatoes, aiming to throw them and again she was arrested and sent to Preston prison.

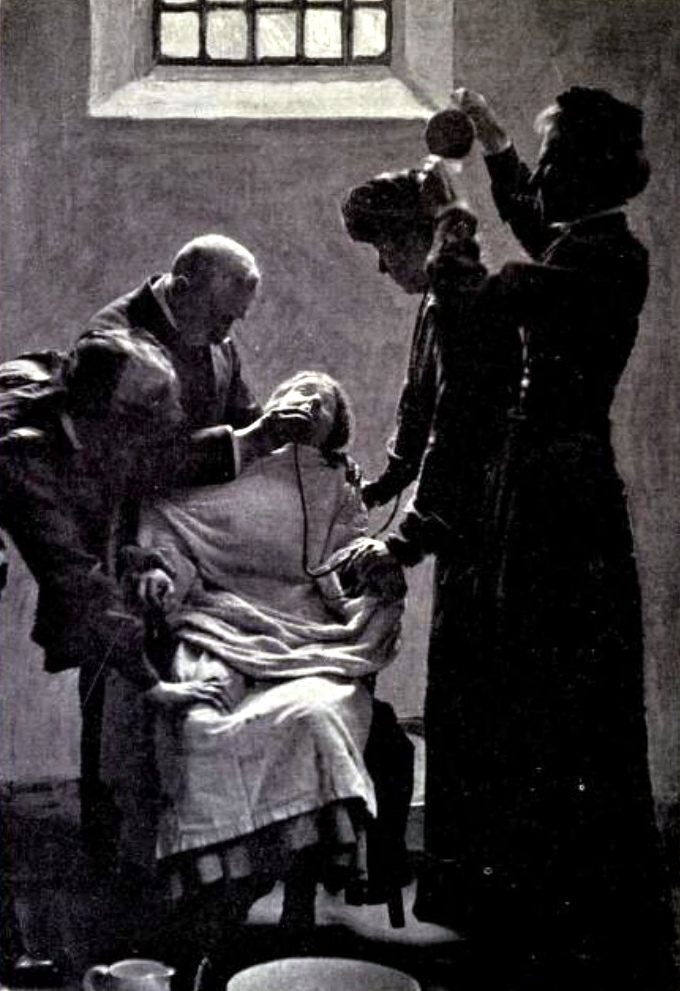
Force feeding of suffragettes

Due to the militancy spreading, women were being denied access to political events, and the streets around venues cleared ahead of time, but a large crowd, estimated at 6,000, aimed to enter an event on 3 December 1909, held by Winston Churchill MP, who was president of the Board of Trade. Hesmondhalgh was in the front shouting outside the venue, with a large group, at the barriers in Fox Street, refusing to leave after being denied access. She was roughly grabbed from her position by the police (150 were on duty that night including some from London) and protesting women had been pelted by manure. She was arrested for 'obstruction' and sentenced to seven days in prison along with Rigby, Grace Alderman and Margaret Hewitt, or to be obliged to pay a fine. In her court appearance, she chose prison, and said that as a working woman she knew the value of the vote. She and the others went on hunger strike and were force-fed.

=== Prisoners Banner ===
Her signature (E. E. Hesmondhalgh) was embroidered on WSPU Holloway Prisoners Banner, one of 80 women who had been imprisoned on hunger strike in 1910; it was created by a fellow hunger striker, and needlework artist at Glasgow School of Art, Ann Macbeth. The banner was first displayed at the WSPU Scottish Exhibition and Bazaar at St Andrew's Hall, Glasgow. It was bought by Frederick Pethick-Lawrence and used in processions and events, including a memorial event in 1950, and is now in the Museum of London archives.

=== Further militancy and branch leadership ===
In 1913, on Easter Monday, she went with Edith Rigby to Manchester's Free Trade Hall to listen to (and disrupt) a meeting of the Labour MP James Thomas. Rigby threw black puddings at the speaker; Hesmondhalgh was said to have laughed at the 'freshness' of the meat. Further risks were taken to assist Rigby place a pipe-bomb under the Liverpool Cotton Exchange on 5 July 1913, by earlier collecting it from the bomb-maker but she met a male friend, who was a detective, and questioned the weight of the 'material' in the suitcase that she was carrying when he offered to assist. When Rigby was later in hiding, the Preston branch had Hesmondhalgh as its honorary secretary, a post she held until April 1914, and she was successful at fundraising. She was sent to the Albert Hall national WSPU meeting with a 'creditable sum' raised from a 'Self-Denial Week', from their base now at 22 Adelphi Street, Preston. Her role was taken over by Eleanor Higginson. Later in 1914, Hesmondhalgh was reported as lending six books to the branch library.

=== Hunger strike medal ===
Around this time she was presented with an illuminated address from Emmeline Pankhurst, the WSPU leader, for her services to the cause and was awarded the 'for valour' Hunger Strike Medal, along with others at a Manchester ceremony.

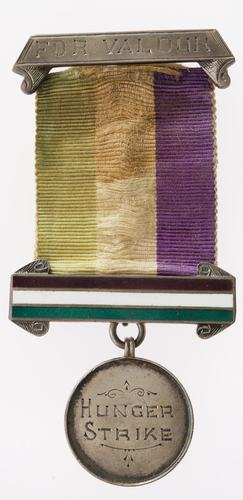
Hunger Strike Medal

During the First World War, the militant suffragettes withdrew their activism, as instructed by Emmeline Pankhurst, and were, including Hesmondhalgh, in turn pardoned by the Home Office for their offences. After the war she lived with Eleanor Higginson in Bognor, Sussex.

== See also ==
- Edith Rigby
- Eleanor Higginson
- History of feminism
- Lists of suffragists and suffragettes
- Women's suffrage in the United Kingdom
