= George Robinson (cricketer, born 1949) =

English cricketer

Personal information
- Full name: George Adrian Robinson
- Born: 3 November 1949 (age 77); Preston, Lancashire, England
- Batting: Left-handed
- Role: Wicketkeeper-batsman

Domestic team information
- Years: Team
- 1970–1971: Oxford University

Career statistics
Competition	First-class
Matches	14
Runs scored	573
Batting average	22.92
100s/50s	0/4
Top score	62
Balls bowled	0
Wickets	–
Bowling average	–
5 wickets in innings	–
10 wickets in match	–
Best bowling	–
Catches/stumpings	19/1
- Source: Cricinfo, 17 December 2018

George Adrian Robinson (born 3 November 1949) is a former first-class cricketer who played for Oxford University in 1970 and 1971.

George Robinson was educated at Preston Catholic College in Lancashire before going up to Pembroke College, Oxford. A wicketkeeper-batsman, he played several useful innings for Oxford in the 1971 season, at first in the middle order and then later as an opener, partnering Keith Jones. He was Oxford's highest scorer in 1971 with 546 runs at an average of 26.00, "the only player who could put his head down and graft when things were going wrong".
