= Manadon =

Suburb of Plymouth, Devon

Coordinates: 50.41389°N 4.136667°W

- Location within Devon
- Unitary authority: Plymouth
- Ceremonial county: Devon
- Region: South West
- Country: England
- Sovereign state: United Kingdom
- Post town: PLYMOUTH
- Postcode district: PL5 3xx
- Dialling code: 01752
- Police: Devon and Cornwall
- Fire: Devon and Somerset
- Ambulance: South Western

Manadon is a predominantly post-war suburb of Plymouth in the English county of Devon.

Roughly geographically situated in the centre of the city, it has a primary school, St Boniface's Catholic College (secondary comprehensive), a sports and community hub, two neighbourhood grocers (one with a post office) and is home to the Manadon interchange, on the A38 road Parkway. It is also home to Plymouth Parkway F.C., a Southern Football League football club based at Bolitho Park, and The Church of the Ascension situated in The Lawns.

Most of the housing stock in the area was built during the post-war period as part of Plymouth's expansion after the Second World War, with the estate bordered between Honicknowle Lane to the west and St Peter's Road to the east. A second estate, Brake Farm, was built in the early 1970s and comprises several flat-roof houses and bungalow units.

The Chaucer Way Primary School closed in 2009 due to dwindling numbers, leaving Manadon Vale as the sole primary school in the area. The demolition of the school and subsequent clearance of the site brought about the construction of affordable housing, named Poets Corner in recognition of the names of the neighbouring streets such as Chaucer Way, Byron Avenue and Sheridan Road.

Manadon Park, a development of varying housing types is built on the former site of the RNEC Manadon (HMS Thunderer), the Royal Navy's former Engineering College. The area retains Manadon House, the old Manor House and former chapel from its naval service.

An enclosed nature reserve has been developed towards the eastern quarter of Manadon Park estate but is not open to the public. Other green spaces include Sheridan Park, Manadon Woods and Bladder Meadow (partially situated in neighbouring Crownhill), all accessible to the public.

There is no notable shopping district, although Honicknowle offers up a large retail park (Transit Way), situated at the northern edge of Brake Farm and bordered by the Ham Brook tributary and including a Tesco, Argos (retailer), Lidl and Matalan among others. It can be accessed on foot via Shakespeare Road in Brake Farm or by road via Crownhill Road.

Public transport is provided by Plymouth Citybus in the form of services 60 and 61 and serves the western half of Manadon.
