= Martin Westlake =

British-Belgian author, academic and civil servant

Martin Westlake (born 1957) is a British and Belgian author (historical, science fiction and short stories in various genres), playwright, biographer, academic and a former high-ranking EU civil servant. He is married to Belgian artist Godelieve Vandamme.

== Fiction ==
Westlake's forthcoming full-length historical novel, Other Than an Aspen Be, set in the 1914-1918 period, portrays the scourge of war and the plight of refugees and the existential dilemmas these cause. Westlake is represented by Bill Goodall.

Westlake has had more than twenty short stories published in various genres. His SF short stories have been published in Aphelion and Metaphorosis. His 2021 story, "Going Home", was selected for inclusion in New Con Press' Best of British Science Fiction 2021 list.

A young adult SF novel, The Hunt, was published in 2016 under the pseudonym, Paul Bird. In an interview about the book, which features a young gamer in a futuristic world, Westlake cites various inspirations including art, literature, and the Bible.

== Playwright ==
Westlake's plays have been performed in Brussels and elsewhere. His farce, The Impotence of Being Frank, was first performed at the Warehouse Theatre (Brussels) by the English Comedy Club (ECC) in May 2017. The comedy was reprised by the ECC at the Warehouse Theatre in May 2019, and taken to the Festival of European Anglophone Theatre Societies (FEATS) in Ottobrun (Munich), where it was performed at the Entity Theatre in June 2019. His Sons and Mothers, six monologues about "three mothers who have lost their sons and three sons who have lost their mothers", was performed by the Little Seal Company at the Warehouse Theatre in October 2019. Westlake was also an original cast member. In 2025 his The Experiment was performed by students at the International School of Brussels. It was performed again the next year at The Nine Club (Brussels).

== Collaborations ==
Westlake has partnered Brussels-based composer Nigel Clarke in music/verse compositions. These have included Heritage Suite/What Hope Saw (2009); Earthrise (2010); Storm Surge (2013); The City in the Sea (2013); Where a Scarlet Flower Will Blossom (2014); and Mysteries of the Horizon (2015).

== Biographer ==
In 2001 Westlake published a full-length biography of British Labour politician Neil Kinnock. Mail on Sunday described the biography as "frank". The Independent on Sunday called it one of the most sublimely constructed and factually complete literary gems of the year".

Westlake has since contributed chapters about various aspects of Kinnock's career to a number of edited publications. In 2017 he collaborated with the London Almeida Theatre's Figures of Speech series with an essay about Neil Kinnock's 1987 "A Thousand Generations" speech. He has contributed biographical essays to The Oxford Dictionary of National Biography, notably about former European Parliament Secretary-General Julian Priestley.

== Academic career ==
Since 2013 Westlake has been a visiting professor at the College of Europe in Bruges, where he also sits on the Academic Council. From 2013 until 2025 he ran a research seminar on the constitutional, institutional and political reform of the European Union and its institutions. Between 2000 and 2005 he taught a course at the College about the European Parliament. Since 2025 he has co-taught (together with Dermot Hodson) an optional course entitled 'Politics People and Power: Personalities and European Integration.' From 2018 until 2025 he ran an annual workshop on 'How to find work in the European Union and its institutions.' His former students include Roberta Metsola (née Tedesco), President of the European Parliament since 2022. Westlake is also a visiting professor at the European Institute at the London School of Economics and Political Science, where since 2013 he co-organises and co-chairs, with Anthony Teasdale, a weekly seminar on The EU in Practice; Politics and Power in the Brussels System.

== Civil service career ==
Starting in 1985, Westlake had a lengthy career in European organisations and the EU institutions, rising to become Secretary-General of the European Economic and Social Committee, 2008-2013 before taking early retirement. He began his career in the Council of Europe, working for the Parliamentary Assembly. Joining the European Union, he worked for the Council of the European Union, the European Commission (Secretariat General, DG X, DG Education and Culture) and the European Economic and Social Committee, where he worked first as Head of Communications and then as Director of Consultative Works before becoming Secretary-General. During his time in DG Education and Culture he played a key role in developing the Erasmus Mundus programme (now absorbed into Erasmus Plus) the EU's answer to the U.S. Fulbright Program.

== Selected publications ==
Westlake has published widely on the European institutions and British politics. His books as author or editor include:

- Britain's Emerging Euro-Elite? The British in the Directly-Elected European Parliament, 1979–1992, Dartmouth Press, London, 1994
- The European Commission and the European Parliament: Partners and Rivals in the European Policy-Making Process, Butterworth, 1994
- A Modern Guide to the European Parliament, Pinter, London, 1994
- British Politics and European Elections 1994, (with David Butler), Macmillan, London, 1995
- The Council of the European Union, Cartermill International, London, 1995
- The European Union Beyond Amsterdam: New Concepts of European Integration (ed), Routledge, London, 1998
- The Council of the European Union (second edition), John Harper Press, London, 1999
- Leaders of Transition (ed), Macmillan, London, 2000
- British Politics and European Elections 1999, (with David Butler), Macmillan, London, 2000
- Kinnock The Biography, Little Brown, London, October 2001
- The Council of the European Union (third edition, with David Galloway), John Harper Press, London, 2004
- British Politics and European Elections 2004 (with David Butler), Palgrave, London, 2005
- The European Economic and Social Committee, John Harper Press, London, 2016
- Slipping Loose: The UK's Long Drift Away From the European Union, Agenda Press, Newcastle, 2020
- The European Union's New Foreign Policy (ed), Palgrave, London, 2020
- Outside the EU: Options for Britain (ed), Agenda Press, Newcastle, 2020
- People Building Europe: New Developments in EU Personnel and Professionals Studies (ed with Didier Georgakakis), Routledge, London, 2026

Westlake has also published a large number of refereed articles, research and occasional papers, chapters in edited volumes, blog pieces and book reviews.

In 2018, writing under the pseudonym Johannes de Berlaymont, Westlake published Working for the EU: How to get in (2018), and has since run an eight-hour career workshop based on the book each autumn at the College of Europe. A second, completely revised, edition was published in August 2024.

Westlake's occasional journalism has been published inter alia in The Times, the Guardian, the I, the Financial Times, the European Voice, the Bulletin, The Brussels Times and Travel Tomorrow.

== See also ==
European Economic and Social Committee
