= Grace Alderman =

British suffragette

- Born: 1885
- Died: 1968 (aged 82–83); Essex, England
- Occupation: suffragette
- Organization: Women's Social and Political Union
- Known for: Suffragette activism including attempt for women to enter British Parliament property hidden in a furniture van

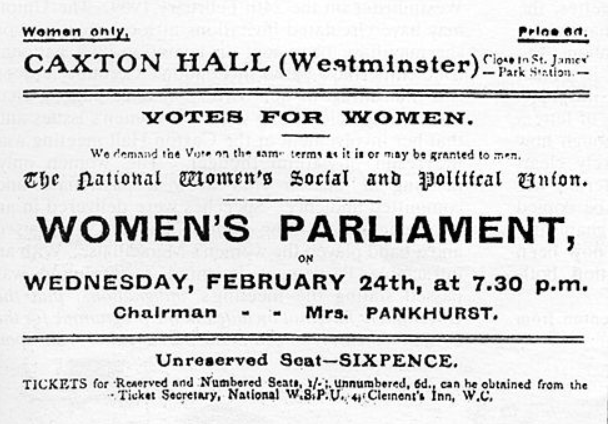
Women's Parliament poster

Grace Alderman (1885 – 1968) was a British suffragette, chairwoman of the Preston Women's Social and Political Union (WSPU) and involved in militant events in London and Preston, and was imprisoned for protesting for women's suffrage.

== Background ==
Grace Muriel Alderman was born in 1885. Alderman's working life began as a machinist, but later she married a solicitor but retained her own name.

== Role in suffrage movement ==
Alderman became the chairwoman of Preston WSPU, which initially met at 28, Winckley Square, Avenham, the home of Edith Rigby. Alderman recognised the challenge for women in her era to take up activism, when responsible for homes and families. She was with a delegation which attended the "Women's Parliament" in Caxton Hall. Alderman was one of the crowd, including three other Preston women, Edith Rigby, Beth Hesmondhalgh, and Rose Towler, who hid in a furniture van as the women's movement charged at the St Stephen's Entrance to Westminster, and she was sentenced to a month in Holloway Prison.

In 1909, Alderman and Edith Rigby, Beth Hesmondhalgh, Rosamund Massy and Margaret Hewitt held meetings across the city of Preston prior to Winston Churchill's event on 3 December. They spoke up against Churchill's stance on women's rights.

On the evening of the event, police activity was intense including special branch from London, trying to ensure that women were going to be excluded, when Alderman and Edith Rigby, Beth Hesmondhalgh, and Catherine Worthington arrived at the door and were refused entry, but would not leave so were again taken away by the police. They were taken to court and went to prison for seven days except for Rigby, as her father, annoyingly, paid the fine claiming that she was just in bad company of "hired women". Edith's brother Arthur was reported to have pointed at another suffragette, Margaret Hewitt, saying that it was all due to "that painted jezebel".

== Later life ==
Alderman wrote about the experiences of Preston suffragettes to Mr R. Fowler of Fulwood in 1964, shortly before she died in 1968 in Essex.
