= Notre Dame Catholic School =

Notre Dame RC School

Location
- Looseleigh Lane; Plymouth, Devon, PL6 5HN; England
- Coordinates: 50°25′17″N 4°07′38″W

Information
- Type: Academy
- Religious affiliation: Roman Catholic
- Established: 1865
- Founders: Sisters of Notre Dame de Namur
- Local authority: Plymouth
- Department for Education URN: 140737 Tables
- Ofsted: Reports
- Head teacher: Michael Antram
- Gender: Females (males in sixth form)
- Age: 11 to 18
- Enrolment: 728
- Houses: Parks, Stang, Nightingale, Curie and Hepburn
- Former name: Notre Dame High School
- Diocese: Plymouth
- Website: https://www.ndonline.org

Notre Dame RC School is a Roman Catholic school for girls in Derriford, Plymouth, England. Its sister school is St Boniface's Catholic College.

The former headteacher, Fiona Hutchings, was headteacher from 2001 until July 2012. Kate White, the current headteacher, assumed Hutchings' position in September 2012. It has 879 students attending. In the sixth form, boys may attend.

It is situated north of the A386, west of the now-closed Plymouth City Airport.

== History ==
It was originally next to Plymouth Cathedral but the site was bombed in 1941. In 1965 a new school building was completed on the grounds of the convent at Looseleigh Lane in Derriford. Sister Mary Xavier was the headmistress.

=== Direct grant grammar school ===
The school was a Catholic girls' direct grant grammar school from 1946, the Notre Dame High School.

In 1976 it was one of 51 direct grant schools, out of 170, that became comprehensive.

=== Comprehensive ===
In 1981 it amalgamated with the Bishop Vaughan Secondary School to become Notre Dame Comprehensive School for Girls. St Boniface's became a comprehensive at the same time.

In 1993 boys were accepted in the sixth form and the school became Notre Dame Roman Catholic School.

Notre Dame had much building work done in the academic year 2007/8: among this was a large professional sports hall, a library and a five-classroom block for history and geography named Stang Block after Dorothy Stang.

=== Academy ===
The school converted to academy status on 1 April 2014.

== Academic performance ==
In 2019, at GCSE, the school's Progress 8 score was average. The proportion of pupils entering the English Baccalaureate was below average, as was the percentage of pupils attaining Grade 5 or above in English & maths GCSEs and the school's Attainment 8 score.

The average result at the school for A level in 2019 was C−, just below the Plymouth and England figures.

== Notable former pupils ==
=== Notre Dame High School ===
- Christine Crawley, Baroness Crawley, Labour MEP from 1984 to 1999 for Birmingham East
- Moira Whyte, Professor of Respiratory Medicine since 1996 at the Sheffield Medical School
- Lagi Tuima, rugby union player for Bristol, Harlequins and England since 2017.

== See also ==
- St Boniface's Catholic College
- List of direct grant grammar schools
