= Margaret Hewitt (suffragette) =

British suffragette

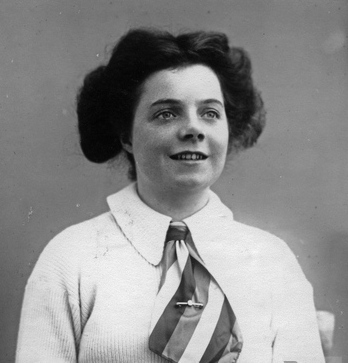
- in 1909 at the "Suffragette's Rest"
- Born: Margaret Just Hewitt; 28 June 1889; Godley
- Died: 23 September 1972 (aged 83); Worthing Sussex
- Education: Victoria University of Manchester
- Occupation: activist
- Employer: WSPU
- Known for: organising suffragette protests fl. 1909

Margaret Just Hewitt (1889–1972), name after marriage Margaret Fyffe, was a British suffragette employed by the Women's Social and Political Union (WSPU). She was prominent in protests in 1909. She was chosen to visit the Eagle House aka "Suffragette's Rest" where a plaque commemorated her planting a holly bush, in the arboretum.

== Early life ==
Hewitt was born in Godley, the youngest of four daughters of the engineer James Mitchell Hewitt (1855–1918). He was born in Glasgow, and from 1889 to c.1899 worked for Mather & Platt at Salford. He held motor-vehicle patents, and became managing director of Saver Clutch Co. Her mother was Isabella Paxton (probate award was to Isabel Paxton Hewitt), daughter of John Paxton of Manchester; her parents were married in 1881 at the Brunswick Street chapel in Manchester, by the Scottish Presbyterian minister William Rigby Murray.

The family moved to Hale, Cheshire, having previously lived at Chorlton on Medlock. The eldest daughter Mary Elizabeth Hewitt went to Newnham College, Cambridge on a scholarship, and was placed 27th in the Mathematical Tripos in 1904. A newspaper reported at the time that she was "of Scottish descent", "her father being an Ayrshire man, and her mother hailing from Haddingtonshire", and that she had been coached by G. H. Hardy. Margaret's elder sister Annie Paxton Hewitt graduated with a B.A. in Modern Languages from the Victoria University of Manchester in 1905.

== Suffragette ==
Christabel Pankhurst graduated in 1906 from Victoria University of Manchester with a law degree. Margaret Hewitt in Hale was on good terms with her around 1907, working on local by-election campaigning for suffrage. It resulted in a recommendation of Hewitt from Pankhurst to Jennie Baines and Mary Gawthorpe of the WSPU. Hewitt began work as a WSPU organiser, in Newhaven and Preston.

In 1908 Hewitt came to notice when she interrupted Lord Carrington as he arrived in Manchester to give him a copy of the newspaper Votes for Women. Carrington told her to send it to him by post. She was also campaigning that month in Greater Manchester at Altringham and organising the collecting stewards for a suffragist meeting in Heaton Park.

=== Bermondsey by-election 1909 ===
In 1909, Hewitt was WSPU's leader for Dorset, based at 9, Gloucester Terrace, Weymouth.

During the campaigning for the 1909 Bermondsey by-election, a suffragist manifesto was issued, signed by H. N. Brailsford, W. Hugh Fenton MD and seven others; Fenton, originally William Hugh Fenton-Jones, was also the second signatory after Victor Horsley of Flora Murray's memorial to Prime Minister Henry Asquith on the force-feeding of suffragette prisoners on hunger strike. Hewitt spoke on the streets of Bermondsey, a picture of her by the Daily Mirror appearing in the press.

On 29 October Hewitt attended, uninvited, a reception given by Laura McLaren, Baroness Aberconway, with Laura Ainsworth and two male friends, intending to raise the issue of the force-feeding of suffragettes. She and Ainsworth spoke separately to Asquith about it, showing him a protest poster. Hewitt commented on the by-election, lost the previous day by the Liberal candidate, and said she had campaigned there against the Liberals. After she had left, Ainsworth showed Asquith the poster again, and was led away by detectives. One of the male friends engaged in conversation with Winston Churchill, who was "studiously rude".

=== Preston protest 1909 ===
On 30 November, Hewitt spoke at a public meeting in Preston, chaired by Alice Bamber-Bowtell (née Bamber, recently married to Thomas Henry Bowtell). Hewitt announced in general terms a protest against Winston Churchill, a member of the Asquith cabinet. She went over her earlier encounter with Asquith, and said that suffragists had supported the Liberals in the 1906 general election. She stated that their militancy reflected the feeling that the Liberals were "false friends".

On 3 December 1909 suffragettes were arrested for obstruction during the visit by Churchill to Preston. Those taken to court were Edith Rigby, Grace Alderman, Catherine Worthington and Beth Hesmondhalgh. They chose prison for seven days, in preference to a fine. However the next day Rigby's father, the surgeon Alexander Clement Rayner, paid the fine. Rayner claimed that his daughter was in the bad company of "hired women". Rigby's brother Arthur Ernest Rayner, in the X-department of the Preston Royal Infirmary, had reportedly pointed at Hewitt, saying that it was all due to "that painted jezebel". Hewitt was wearing a hat at an eye-catching angle and lipstick. Arthur Rayner's biographer Phoebe Hesketh wrote that Rigby "fell in with Christabel Pankhurst's idea of pestering ministers who by now were barring women from their meetings". She had founded the WSPU group in Preston early in 1907; often in prison, Rigby had as recognised stand-in Alice Bamber.

At the end of the day in court, Hewitt entered the witness box, wearing "a long violet motoring veil". She gave her address as 4 Clement's Inn, London, and occupation as London WSPU organiser. She applied for the return of the bucket and mop "seized" from Rosamund Massy, receiving a dusty answer; Massy had been arrested the previous day for breaking a Post Office window. Her sentence for wilful damage was a fine or a month's imprisonment. "Stylishly dressed and of a ladylike appearance", she had commented that remand and delayed punishment might mean she would miss taking her child on holiday to Switzerland. She refused to pay the fine, and in prison went on hunger strike; her mother Lady Knyvett paid the fine after a week.

On 11 December, at a meeting in Preston Public Hall, Hewitt presided on a platform with Mary Gawthorpe and Jane Brailsford. In a speech she said that militant protests would continue.

== In prison? ==
Margaret Hewitt appears in a network diagram for the activism of Mary Blaythwayt in the period 1909–1913, as an imprisoned suffage militant. A ground rule for WSPU protests said to have been made by Emmeline Pankhurst was that those under 21, the age of majority, should not engage in acts that could lead to a prison sentence: Hewitt turned 21 in 1910.

A Nest of Suffragettes in Somerset: Eagle House, Batheaston says only that Margaret Hewitt "may have been the Miss Hewitt who was later imprisoned". A "Miss Hewitt" was in Holloway Prison in June 1912, a suffragette who was force-fed. This was not the WSPU member Annie Gertrude Hewitt (born 1880 in Hull), a teacher, who was not imprisoned. Mary Hewitt, who was defended by G. R. Blanco White, was a suffragette sentenced to prison for four months in April 1912. She was Mary Graily Hewitt, a signatory that year of the Suffragette Handkerchief.

== Later life ==
At the beginning of World War I, Hewitt worked for the Secret Service Bureau. Subsequently she was employed by an ordnance factory in Cheshire, as a welfare superintendent.

As Margaret Just Fyffe, she graduated M.A. (Arts) from Victoria University Manchester in 1916; she had read economics.

== Awards and honours ==
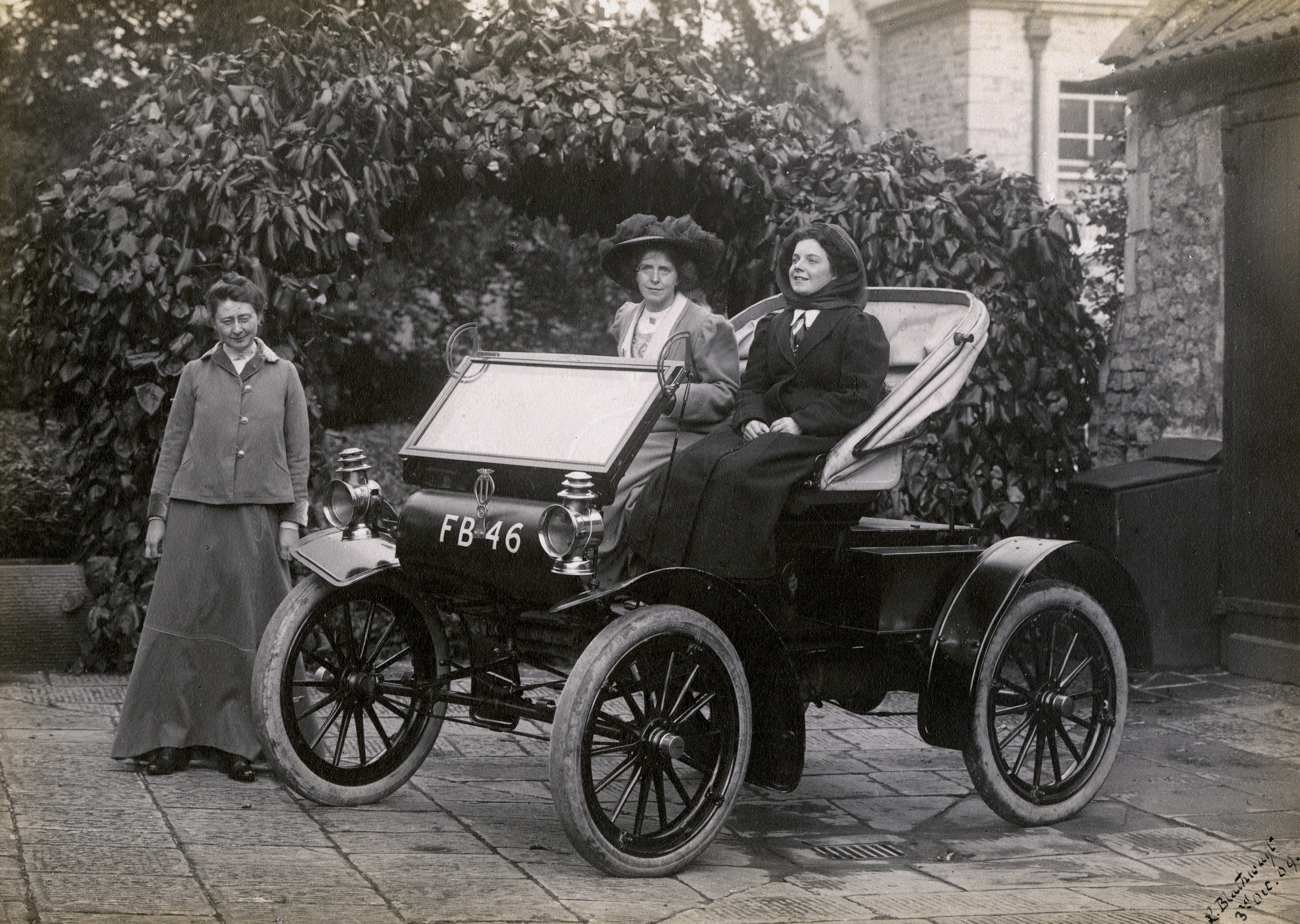
Mary Blathwayt, Annie Kenney, Margaret Hewitt and Bodo (the car)

Hewitt was invited to Eagle House aka "Suffragette's Rest" near Bath. Activists from the suffragette movement were invited to stay at the Blathwayt's house and to plant a tree. The trees were known as "Annie's Arboretum" after Annie Kenney. Hewitt planted an Ilex aquifolium albo marginata Holly on 3 October 1909 in Annie's Arboretum. She had her photo taken by Linley Blathwayt, a lead plaque was mounted and she was photographed with Annie, Mary Blathwayt and Bodo (Linley Blathwayt's Oldsmobile car).

== Family ==
Margaret Hewitt married in 1915 William Fyffe (1887–1976), a civil engineer. They lived in Ceylon and India from 1921 to 1933. They were survived by two children.
