= St Boniface's Catholic College =

Location
- 21 Boniface Lane; Plymouth, Devon, PL5 3AG; England; 50.40583°N 4.13639°W

Information
- Type: Academy
- Motto: Bona Facite (Do Good)
- Religious affiliation: Roman Catholic
- Established: 1856; 1863
- Founder: George Errington
- Local authority: Plymouth
- Department for Education URN: 140693 Tables
- Ofsted: Reports
- Chairman: Judith Johnson
- Head Teacher: Michael Antram
- Chaplain: Fiona Hutchings
- Staff: 41 teaching, 41 support
- Gender: Boys
- Age: 11 to 16
- Enrolment: 528
- Houses: Barrett; Errington; Grimshaw; Keily; Vaughan
- Colours: Navy, Maroon
- Publication: The Beacon
- Former pupils: Old Bonifacians
- Patron Saint: St Boniface
- Website: http://www.stbonifaces.com

St Boniface's Catholic College is a secondary school for boys, under the direction and trustees of the Roman Catholic Community in the Plymouth area in the South West of England. Founded in 1856 as an independent boarding and day school for "young Catholic gentlemen" in the West Country, it is now a comprehensive school. The college is named for St Boniface who was born in Crediton, Devon and is the patron saint of Germany. The school has a list of distinguished former pupils including Air Chief Marshal Sir John Gingell , the writer and intelligence agent Alexander Wilson, and Sir Julian Priestley, secretary general of the European Parliament from 1997 to 2007.

The college is a five-form entry college of 528 students between the ages of 11 and 18, taught by a full-time staff of 24. Its main campus is at Manadon Park with sports facilities at Marsh Mills. Its sister school is Notre Dame Catholic School. It is colloquially known as "Bonnies" or abbreviated as SBCC. The school is situated on the west side of the A386, north of the A38 interchange – between the A38 and the B3413.

== History ==
=== Foundation ===
St Boniface's College was founded in 1856 as a school for "young Catholic gentlemen" by the great, if austere, first Roman Catholic Bishop of Plymouth, George Errington (1804–1886). As a result of Bishop Errington's appointment as Coadjutor Archbishop of Westminster in 1855, the college was almost immediately placed under the patronage of his successor as Bishop of Plymouth, William Vaughan (1814–1902). The college's first school building was in Wyndham Square, Plymouth.

=== Early history ===
In 1863, the school was renamed "St Boniface Boys' Catholic School" and relocated to a larger building to Melbourne Street, and later to North Road with a Mr Clarke, an old boy of the Christian Brothers' School in Gibraltar, as Head Master. From the beginning both boarders and day boys were catered for.

St Boniface's College at Buckfast Abbey (1941)

Clarke resigned his post in 1883, but in September of the same year the Basilian Fathers, exiled from France, bought over the property at Beaconfield, Plymouth. This was at the time a considerable distance from the city's residential area and the efficient transport system of today did not exist. Hence, whilst the boarders were accommodated at the residence at Beaconfield a small school for day boys was opened at Grosvenor Street near the centre of Plymouth. It was known as the Catholic Institute and was staffed by teachers from Beaconfield. Clarke who apparently could not suppress his vocation to teach, again took over the school at Grosvenor Street and a little later transferred the pupils to his own residence at Wyndham Square where he carried on his valuable work until 1891. The boarding school at Beaconfield continued under the management of the Basilian Fathers until July 1899, when, under the stress of financial difficulties, they resolved to close the school.

The following year the diocesan authorities purchased premised at Wyndham Square, and the school was placed under the patronage of St Boniface. It was staffed by the diocesan clergy under the headmastership of Provost Burns.

The De La Salle Brothers were invited to take over the management of the school in 1911, but on the outbreak of World War I were recalled to France. Their places were taken by the Presentation Brothers who found the premises at Wyndham Square inadequate, and gave up in 1931.

In September of that year the Christian Brothers accepted the invitation of Barrett to re-open the school at Beaconfield. The buildings had been erected in 1910 as a convent boarding school, provided excellent accommodation for the 127 day boys and fifteen boarders who opened a new era in the schools chequered career.

With the outbreak of World War II the college was evacuated to Buckfast Abbey between 1941 and 1945. The Abbey was instrumental in assuring the school continued during those difficult war years. During this period, the school buildings in Plymouth were used as strategic operation bases for the Admiralty and continued to be used even after the students returned to Beacon Park.

=== Direct Grant Grammar School ===
In 1946 the college was encouraged to become one of the 179 direct grant schools where fees for selected day pupils from lower income families were partly or fully paid by the local authority. The college retained autonomy from the local authority and remained members of the Headmasters' Conference. Situated in Beacon Park, it had 450 boys in the 1970s.

=== Comprehensive ===
When the Labour Government withdrew funding from direct grant schools in 1976, the college, like Manchester Grammar School and others, was forced to decide between reverting to a fully independent school or becoming a voluntary-aided school. After a period as an independent school, in 1981 St Boniface's Catholic College and Bishop Vaughan Catholic School were amalgamated into a Voluntary-Aided boys' Comprehensive school at Crownhill, which then became the Grant Maintained St Boniface's Catholic College. Notre Dame High School became a state school at the same time. In 1999, the college reverted to Voluntary Aided status.

On 13 October 2002 an arson attack created £100,000 of damage. Fortunately, only a temporary classroom block was destroyed.

In 2007 Teachers' TV produced a programme about the use of video feedback to teachers by pupils. "Action! Pupil Video: Look What You've Started" is available for download on the Teachers' TV website. Also in 2007, St Boniface's won the Schools Herald Team of the Year award and on Thursday 13 March 2008 pupils of the college produced the news for the BBC's School Report project. Long standing Headteacher David Kavanagh, having served at the college for over 20 years, retired in July 2007. The board of governors were unable to find an immediate replacement so then deputy head, Jim Murphy, had taken on the role until the end of the academic year 2009. Peter Fairweather is the chair of the governing Body. The current acting head teacher is Mr Andrew Davies.

On 1 January 2008, the college was renamed and readdressed as "St Boniface's Catholic College" at 21 Boniface Lane, Manadon Park, Plymouth.

In 2010, the college participated in BBC News School Report, with some students reading the news on the local BBC Spotlight news programme. Head Boy Luke Garside was chosen as one of 100 Prime Minister's Global Fellows. The programme saw Luke representing the UK as an ambassador in China through the summer of 2010.

The school marked its sesquicentennial in September 2013.

=== Academy ===
Previously a voluntary aided school administered by Plymouth City Council and the Roman Catholic Diocese of Plymouth, St Boniface's Catholic College converted to academy status on 1 April 2014. The school is now sponsored by the Catholic and Anglican Schools Trust; however, the school continues to coordinate with Plymouth City Council and the Diocese of Plymouth for admissions.

== Academic performance ==
At GCSE, the college performs above the England average and about average for Plymouth Local Authority, but at A level it is below the England average.

== Motto and Badge ==
The college motto is Bona Facite, usually translated as Do Good, and, while being a linguistic play on the name of St Boniface, is possibly taken from Chapter 35, Verse 15 of Jeremiah, "Misique ad vos omnes servos meos prophetas, consurgens diluculo mittensque, et dicens: Convertimini unusquisque a via sua pessima, et bona facite studia vestra: et nolite sequi deos alienos, neque colatis eos, et habitabitis in terra quam dedi vobis et patribus vestris: et non inclinastis aurem vestram, neque audistis me" (And I have sent to you all my servants the prophets, rising early, and sending and saying: Return ye every man from his wicked way, and make your ways good: and follow not strange gods, nor worship them, and you shall dwell in the land, which I gave you and your fathers: and you have not inclined your ear, nor hearkened to me).

The college badge proclaims the school's origins. The cross of St Andrew represents the Old Cathedral Church of Plymouth, the Bishop's staff represents the patronage of St Boniface; and the cross keys of St Peter represent the Catholic Church, towards which the college owes its allegiance. The badge's blue background echoes the college's connections with the sea.

The school tie is mainly purple to represent the Bishop. The diagonal silver band flanked with gold on either side denotes loyalty to the Holy See, whilst the thin red lines between purple and gold commemorates the martyrdom of St Boniface.

== Uniform ==
The college uniform has changed very little in almost a century. Though shorts and caps are no longer required, the following remain:

- Black blazer with the school badge on the pocket
- White shirt
- Black/charcoal grey trousers
- Black socks
- Black leather lace-up shoes with a heel
- Blue school tie

Until the 1980s, the college blazer and cap were purple for students in First Form (Year 7) - Fifth Form (Year 11), with Sixth Form wearing a black version of the blazer. This was eventually adopted as the main school uniform.

In 2006 an optional black waterproof Gore-Tex jacket was introduced to modernise the uniform.

In 2009 house coloured silicon bands were introduced to identify which house each student belonged to, whilst Diploma students were issued a grey version of the school jacket.

In 2014, a new sports kit was launched.

== House system ==
The college has a long-standing House System. Originally it hosted three Houses - named for local areas: Devon, Edgcumbe and Peverell. In 1951 the college felt it was time to increase the number of houses to four to "facilitate the organisation of inter-house competitions." The new Houses were named to bear "some relation to the history and progress of Catholic secondary education in the city." The houses were: Abbey (Buckfast Abbey), Grosvenor (Grosvenor Street), Melbourne (Melbourne Street) and Wyndham (Wyndham Square).A fifth house, named Beacon was subsequently added. Boarders were all members of School House. Then in 1981 the Houses were renamed for Plymouth Bishops, being Barrett, Grimshaw, Keily and Vaughan. To accommodate increasing intake numbers, a fifth house was added in September 1995, also named for a Bishop; Errington House. These five houses remain until 2015 going back to just the first four houses.. In July 2009 the House System was relaunched with the current Heads of Year becoming Heads of House. During the mid-1950s School House was established. Its membership was confined to the Boarders.

== Sport ==
The college has a long tradition of playing rugby, cricket and athletics to a very high standard, consistently challenging the strongest school opponents in the west country and further afield. In more recent years hockey has also been played to a very high standard.

Since 1904 St Boniface's has seen a good number of its First XV selected to play for the England Schools Rugby Union (ESRU).

in 2009 the Year 7 Rugby Team reached the final of the Cunningham Cup against Kelly College and drew the game, though came second in the competition because of points difference. The Year 9 Rugby team, who themselves had been Cunningham Cup winners when in Year 7, went on to win the West Devon 7's and reached the final of the Devon 7's. The Year 7 rugby teams of 2015/16 & 2016/17 also claimed the Cunningham Cup later.

In 2009, the college's junior hockey team were placed in the "elite" league playing against much more experienced sides because of their exceptional performance in the previous season.

Although traditionally a rugby orientated school, St Boniface have a produced a number of talented footballers such as former Plymouth Argyle striker Mickey Evans and former Cardiff City striker Joe Mason.

The school have collected a number of football honours over years and dominated the Plymouth Schools competitions in the late 1980s and have done so again more recently. In March 2012 the Year 11 team, coached by Head of PE Chris Mather, won the Plymouth Schools Cup for the third year in succession, defeating Devonport High School for Boys 3-1 after extra time with goals from Merveille Ramazani, Lewis Sutton and Oliver Price. In the same year the side reached the last 16 of the National Schools FA Cup, losing on penalties and also reached the final of the Devon Schools FA Cup.

=== St Boniface Arena ===
The college owns St Boniface Arena, home to the Plymouth Devils speedway team. The land was used as playing fields for 25 years, until in 2006, the Local Authority approved temporary planning permission to Mike Bowden to build a stadium for the Plymouth Devils. In 2007, the planning permission was made permanent.

There is still one playing field for the school to use. The field is also used by Plymouth Victoria Rugby Club for fixtures in the Devon 1 SW league.

== The Corps (OTC/ACF/CCF) ==
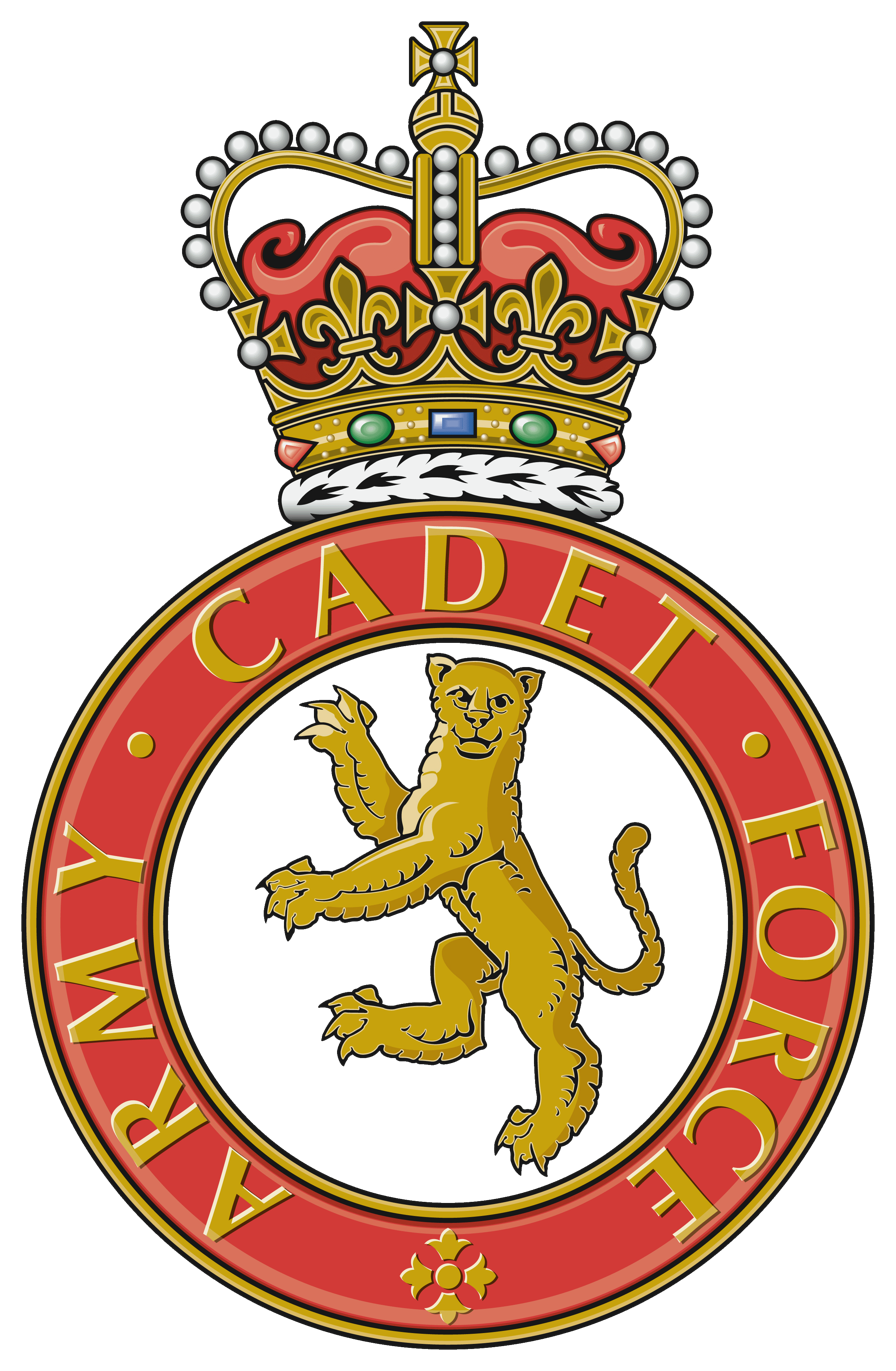
Army Cadet Force Crest

The college operated an Army Cadet unit, or The Corps as it was more familiarly known, from an early date until becoming a voluntary-aided school in 1981. In 1908, when the Territorial Army was formed, the college unit became part of the Officer Training Corps, and in 1914, when all independent Cadet units were taken under control by the War Office, it became part of the Army Cadet Force.

In 1923, all Governmental and Military support for the ACF was withdrawn as a result of Defence cutbacks (the Geddes Axe), and this led to the forming of the British National Cadet Association (BNCA) by notable figures such as Lord Allenby who were keen to maintain the ACF and lobby for Government funding.

In 1942 the ACF was re-formed as a support to the Home Guard and in 1948, the college Corps, along with other independent school units, became part of the newly formed Combined Cadet Force (CCF). The corps, which had its own building including a rifle range, had a long association with The Devonshire Regiment, which became The Devonshire and Dorset Regiment in 1958, and wore its regimental cap badge as part of the cadet uniform. the college provided a steady stream of officers to both regiments from the late 19th century to the mid-20th century.

== Online Archive ==
The college has an extensive photographic and digital document archive, hosted with flickr to allow students, parents, Old Bonifacians and the press access to photographs of the school and its events. Images date back as far as 1911.

== School song ==
Rise, rise and sing aloud proclaim
The School's renown and cherished name
Long years to come her beacon bright
Shine still undimmed, our guiding light
Enduring be the Faith we own, with zeal, as Boniface, to cast
The seed abroad of truth unknown and evil to things to crush at last

Then, Bonifacians, sing her praise:
In strength and grace through all her days
In strength and grace through all her days

And when to manhood we attain
We shall recall with pride again
Green fields where we her fame assured
Her sterner classroom tasks endured
Mid other scenes and joys newfound
Recall, while heart with pleasure fills
The View to South of Plymouth Sound
To North the rolling Devon Hills

Then, Bonifacians, sing her praise:
In strength and grace through all her days
In strength and grace through all her days

Long Live! Long live! The School!
Long Live! Long live! The School!

== Head Teachers ==
Provost Burns (Head Teacher 1900-1911)

- Mr Clarke (1863–1883) Melbourne Street
- Basilian Fathers (1883–1899) Beaconfield
- Mr Clarke (1883–1899) Grosvenor Street/Wyndham Square
- Provost Michael John Burns (1900–1911) Wyndham Square
- Presentation Brothers (1911–1931) Wyndham Square
- Br J H Dudley McDonald (1931–1944) Beaconfield
- Abbot Bruno Fehrenbacher (1941–1945) Buckfast Abbey
- Br B P Dolan (1944–1950) Beaconfield
- Br P C Curran (1950–1954) Beaconfield
- Br Harry A Grice (1954–1960) Beaconfield/Beacon Park
- Br B D McHugh (1960–1966) Beacon Park
- Br Tom Coleman (1966–1971) Beacon Park
- Br Darcy (1971–1972) Beacon Park
- Br Cornelius John Sreenan (1972–1987) Beacon Park/Crownhill
- Br David Kavanagh (1987–1995) Crownhill
- David Kavanagh (1995–2007) Crownhill
- James Lawrence Murphy (2007–2009) Crownhill/Manadon Park
- Peter Eccles (2009–2013) Manadon Park
- Andrew Davies (2013–2014) Manadon Park
- Frank Ashcroft (2014–2016 ) Manadon Park
- Neil Maslen (2016–2018) Manadon Park
- Mary Cox (2018–2020) Manadon Park
- Katherine White (2020–2023) Manadon Park
- Michael Antram (2023–) Manadon Park

== Notable former pupils ==
=== Voluntary aided school ===
- Mickey Evans (1983–1989) - former footballer, Plymouth Argyle
- Liam Mooney (1983-1990) - former rugby player, London Irish, Exeter Chiefs, Ireland Wolfhounds (formerly Ireland A) and Barbarian F.C.
- Alex Meechan (1991–1996) - former footballer, Swindon Town
- Luke Arscott (1995–2000) - rugby player, Exeter Chiefs
- Tom Arscott (1998–2003) - rugby player, Worcester Warriors
- Jack Gilding (1999–2004) - rugby player, Edinburgh
- Joe Mason (2003–2008) - footballer, Cardiff City
- Rus Tuima (2011–2014), rugby player, Exeter Chiefs
- Angel Waruih (2015–2020), footballer, Plymouth Argyle, Brentford

=== Direct Grant Grammar school ===
- Malcolm S W Ashworth (1939–1944), Chairman of Crawford's Advertising Agency
- Air Chief Marshal Sir John Gingell - Senior Royal Air Force commander. Retired in 1984, then served as Black Rod in the Houses of Parliament until 1992
- Dr Bernard MacManus, Vice-Chancellor from 1992 to 1994 of Bournemouth University, and Director from 1983 to 1991 of the Dorset Institute for Higher Education and from 1991 to 1992 of Bournemouth Polytechnic
- Stefan Nahorski, Professor of Pharmacology from 1984 to 2006 at the University of Leicester
- Peter Nolan, Sinyi Professor of Chinese Management since 1997 at the Judge Business School, University of Cambridge
- Sir Julian Priestley (b. 1950), Secretary General of the European Parliament from 1997 to 2007 and author.

== Controversy ==
In 2013, the headmaster, Peter Eccles, was suspended following allegations, which did not relate to pupils, concerning his private life. At the same time a former bursar was facing charges of fraud but later those charges were dropped to lack of evidence and it was revealed that 33 members of staff had left since Mr Eccles became head in 2009.

In August 2016 a former teacher, Paul Kelly, was sentenced to ten years imprisonment by the High Court in Glasgow upon conviction of the physical and sexual abuse of boys between the years 1979 and 1983 at St Ninian's Orphanage, Falkland, Fife. Kelly was at the time a member of the Irish Christian Brothers.

== See also ==
- Buckfast Abbey
- Roman Catholic Diocese of Plymouth
- Notre Dame Catholic School
- Bishop Errington
- Saint Boniface
- Plymouth Devils Speedway Team
- St Boniface Arena
- List of direct grant grammar schools
