= George Errington (bishop) =

British Roman Catholic churchman

The Most Reverend George Errington
- Coadjutor Archbishop Emeritus of Westminster and Titular Archbishop of Trebizond
- Province: Westminster
- Diocese: Westminster
- Installed: 30 March 1855
- Term ended: 22 July 1860
- Other post: Bishop of Plymouth (27 June 1851–30 March 1855)

Orders
- Ordination: 22 December 1827 (Priest)
- Consecration: 25 July 1851 (Bishop)

Personal details
- Born: 14 September 1804 Clints Hall, Marske, England
- Died: 19 January 1886 (aged 81) Prior Park, Somerset, England
- Denomination: Roman Catholic Church

George Errington (14 September 1804 – 19 January 1886) was an English Roman Catholic prelate who served as Coadjutor Archbishop of Westminster from 1855 to 1860.

== Life ==
He was a boyhood friend of Nicholas Wiseman, the future Cardinal Archbishop of Westminster in 1850. Although two years behind Wiseman, they were both students at Ushaw and then at the English College, Rome. He was ordained priest in Rome on 22 December 1827.

In 1828 he was appointed Vice-Rector of the English College, where Wiseman had been appointed Rector. Wiseman became a bishop in England in 1840, in 1843 he got Errington appointed as Director of Studies at St Mary's College, Oscott, of which Wiseman was President, and which both left in 1847. He was consecrated first Bishop of Plymouth on 25 July 1851, having previously been rector of the church of St. John the Evangelist in Salford. In February 1854 he held a synod at Ugbrooke Park, and among his synodal acts, established a clerical conference with its dean for each county.

In 1855 when Wiseman applied for a coadjutor, Errington was appointed, with the title of Archbishop of Trebizond in partibus. He accepted the appointment with some reservations, having reminded Wiseman of their previous differences. Errington was a methodical and strict canonist; while Wiseman tended to follow a more sympathetic approach. "In private life Archbishop Errington was gentle and affectionate, and his friends were warmly attached to him; but in his official relations he was stern and inflexible." In October 1855, Errington was sent as temporary administrator to the Diocese of Clifton, where Prior Park Seminary was in financial default. He was not able to do anything to preserve the college. A Court Order was enforced against the college for non-payment of rent, and the contents of the college were sold by auction, and the premises vacated.

Two years later, Henry Edward Manning was appointed Provost of Westminster and he established in Bayswater his community of the Oblates of St Charles. Errington was dubious of what he regarded as Manning's plan to create a clergy independent of the ordinary. His reservations were shared by the Cathedral Chapter and the Vicar General Canon Maguire. Wiseman did not appreciate such opposition. The estrangement was largely a matter of temperament. However it was grave enough for Errington to be deprived by Pope Pius IX of his coadjutorship with right of succession in July 1860.

In 1860, and again in 1863, the Vatican offered him the archbishopric of Port of Spain, Trinidad, which he declined. When Wiseman died in 1865, the Chapter of Westminster proposed him as the first on the list of three candidates they sent to Rome, but Manning was appointed. Meanwhile he had been helping both Bishop Goss of Liverpool and Archbishop Cullen of Dublin with various administrative matters and ordinations. Goss asked him to take charge of the mission to the Isle of Man, and from 1865 to 1868 he was Parish Priest in Douglas. Manning recommended that the Vatican ask Errington to take on the task of preparing for the restoration of the hierarchy in Scotland, but after considerable hesitation he declined. He took part in the First Vatican Council, where he opposed the Neo-ultramontanism of Manning. After that he was asked by Bishop Clifford of Clifton to teach at Prior Park, near Bath, where he died of severe bronchitis, still teaching on his deathbed, on 19 January 1886.

In August 1856, Dr Errington founded St Boniface's Catholic College, Plymouth. In 1995, the school named one of their houses after him.

== Sources ==
- Paul Mould, ‘Errington, George (1804–1886)’, Oxford Dictionary of National Biography, Oxford University Press, 2004, accessed 3 Jan 2008
