= Preston Catholic College =

Location
- Winckley Square; Preston, Lancashire; England; 53.7562°N 2.7030°W

Information
- Type: Direct grant grammar school
- Motto: Latin: Fides (Faith)
- Religious affiliation: Roman Catholic
- Established: 1865
- Closed: 1978
- Local authority: Lancashire County Council
- Oversight: Society of Jesus
- Gender: Boys
- Age range: 11-19
- Enrolment: 915

Preston Catholic College was a Jesuit grammar school for boys in Winckley Square, Preston, Lancashire, England. It opened in 1865 and closed in 1978, when its sixth form merged with two other schools to form Cardinal Newman College.

== History ==
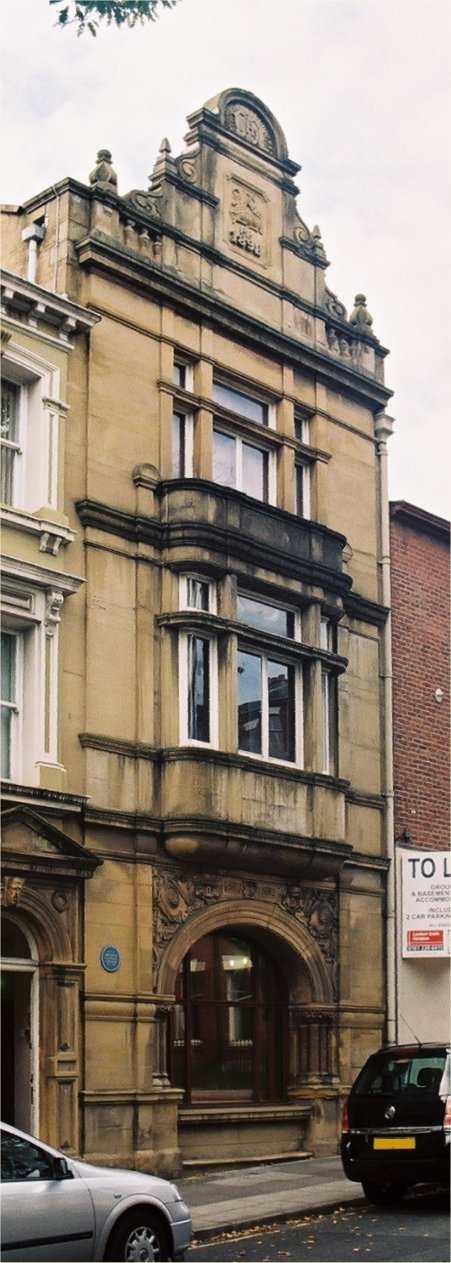
Entrance to the former college, pictured in 2007.

The college began in 1865 in a house in Mount Pleasant (a narrow passage between Winckley Square and Mount Street). In 1879 it moved to 29 Winckley Square and expanded over the next century until, at its peak of 915 pupils in 1970, it occupied the whole of the west side of the square from the northwest corner (number 34) as far south as Garden Street (number 25), with the exception of number 25a and numbers 29 to 32. Classrooms, science laboratories and a swimming pool were built along neighbouring Mount Street in the 1930s. A gymnasium in Garden Street opened in 1970. The college also possessed extensive playing fields one mile (1½ km) south of the college, to which boys walked via the Old Tram Road, a disused tramway.

The introduction of comprehensive schools in Lancashire forced the school, which had become a direct grant grammar school, to stop admitting under-16 pupils from 1978. In that year, its sixth form merged with the sixth forms of the other two Catholic direct grant grammar schools in Preston, namely Winckley Square Convent School and Larkhill Convent Grammar School, to form Newman College. Initially both Winckley Square sites continued to be used, but by 1986 the new college was concentrated at the Larkhill site.

Some of the Mount Street buildings have been demolished, most recently the gymnasium in 2021 after a decade of disuse. The buildings on Winckley Square are used as offices. However the playing fields are still used by Newman College. A blue plaque commemorates the college at its original entrance, number 34. Another blue plaque outside number 28 records its former use as the home of the suffragette Edith Rigby.

In 2010, the school was sued by a former pupil over allegations of abuse. The Jesuits were held liable for the abuse by Fr Michael Spencer and the claimant was awarded £55,000 damages. Other contemporaries have also brought sex abuse claims against the Jesuits.

== Notable alumni ==
- Mark Lawrenson, television football pundit;
- Gregory Doran, Artistic Director of the Royal Shakespeare Company 2012–2022;
- Joseph Delaney, author of the Spook's series;
- Leo Baxendale, cartoonist, creator of The Bash Street Kids and Minnie the Minx;
- Patrick Kelly, archbishop of Liverpool 1996–2013;
- Michael Carr, Liberal Democrat MP for Ribble Valley 1991–92.
- George Robinson, a former first-class cricketer who played for Oxford University in 1970 and 1971.

== Notable staff ==
- 1950s footballer Eddy Brown, after his retirement from the game
- Jesuit hymnwriter James Quinn, Classics Master, 1944–1948
- Mersey poet Adrian Henri, who taught art 1956–57
- Fred Dewhurst, footballer who played for Preston North End (1882–1890) and England (1886–1889)
