= Julian Priestley =

Sir Julian Priestley KCMG

Secretary General of the European Parliament
- In office 1 March 1997 – 1 March 2007
- President: José María Gil-Robles; Nicole Fontaine; Pat Cox; Josep Borrell; Hans-Gert Pöttering
- Preceded by: Enrico Vinci
- Succeeded by: Harald Rømer

Personal details
- Born: Julian Gordon Priestley; 26 May 1950 Croydon, Surrey, England
- Died: 22 April 2017 (aged 66)
- Party: Labour
- Education: St Boniface's Catholic College
- Alma mater: Balliol College, Oxford

Sir Julian Gordon Priestley KCMG (26 May 1950 – 22 April 2017) was an English civil-servant who served as Secretary-General of the European Parliament 1997–2007. He was the second President of the Young European Federalists 1974–1976.

== Biography ==
Born in Croydon, Priestley was educated at St Boniface's Catholic College, Plymouth, and Balliol College, Oxford, graduating in 1972 with an honours degree in philosophy, politics and economics (PPE). He was president of the Oxford Union, chairman of the Oxford University Labour Club and chairman of the Oxford Committee for Europe. In 1971, he was elected national chairman of Students for a United Europe, sharing the chairmanship with Carl Wright as they had been tied for first place in the election. From 1974 to 1976 he was president at European level of the Young European Federalists (Jeunesse Européeene Fédéraliste, JEF).

Priestley stood three times in UK general elections for Labour in Plymouth (twice in Plymouth Sutton in the two 1974 elections and once in Plymouth Devonport in 1983 against David Owen).

Priestley was an Official of the European Parliament from 1973, first as Administrator, then Principal Administrator with the secretariat of the Committee on Budgets 1973–1983, chairman, Staff Committee of the European Parliament (1981–1983), Head of Division of the Committee on Energy, Research and Technology 1984–1987, Co-chairman of the Staff Regulations Committee of the EC (1985–1987), Director in the Directorate General of Committees and Interparliamentary Delegations, responsible for budgetary affairs and the single market 1987–1989, Secretary General, Socialist Group, European Parliament 1989–1994, Director, Private Office of the President of the European Parliament 1994–1997, and Secretary General, European Parliament from March 1997 until March 2007

The Secretariat of the European Parliament is the administration of the European Parliament headed by a Secretary-General. It is based in the Kirchberg district of Luxembourg and around the Brussels-Luxembourg Station in Brussels and employs 4000 officials. As Secretary General, Priestley was the most senior EU civil servant, and the most senior British one ever. Priestley was appointed Knight Commander of the Order of St Michael and St George in the 2007 Birthday Honours. He was asked to participate in the second Irish referendum campaign on the Lisbon Treaty. Priestley is the author of Six Battles That Shaped Europe's Parliament (2008). He died of cancer on 22 April 2017, aged 66.

Priestley's impact on the European Union in general and the European Parliament in particular was subject to academic attention, notably an article by Martin Westlake describing him as a "consequential" civil servant.

== Memorial Lecture ==
In his memory, an annual Julian Priestley lecture was established by former colleagues of his and is hosted by the UK European Movement. The first lecture was given at Europe House in London in 2018 by the Labour Leader in the European Parliament, Richard Corbett MEP, the second in Newcastle in 2019 by the TUC General Secretary Frances O'Grady and the third in 2021 (postponed from 2020 due to Covid) by former Irish diplomat Bobby McDonagh, the fourth in 2022 by the former Green MEP Molly Scott Cato at Somerville college Oxford), the fifth was by Alastair Campbell on 11 May 2023 at Europe House in London, the sixth by Anette Dittert on 7 May 2024 at University College London, the seventh at Somerville College in 2025 by the journalist Jonathan Freedland and the eighth at Europe House in 2026 by the former Labour leader in the House of Lords, Baroness Jan Royall.

Political offices
Preceded by Enrico Vinci	Secretary General of the European Parliament; 1997–2007	Succeeded by Harald Rømer
