= Eleanor Higginson =

British suffragette (1881–1969)

- 1914 picture of her resisting arrest
- Born: Eleanor Beatrice Ellis; 19 April 1881; Plaistow
- Died: 8 June 1969 (aged 88); Chichester
- Occupation: shopkeeper
- Known for: photographed resisting arrest
- Political party: Labour Party
- Spouse: Arnold Higginson
- Children: five

Eleanor Beatrice Higginson (19 April 1881 – 8 June 1969) was a British suffragette.

== Life ==
Higginson was born in Plaistow in London in 1881 to Alfred Leopold and Elizabeth (born Vernon) Ellis. Her father was a seaman who reputedly liked to drink too much. The family moved to Manchester and then on to Preston where she was a teacher. Higginson married in 1905 and had five children. She opened a health food shop in 1910 which she ran for ten years.

Higginson was a well known Labour Party member so like a lot of female members she was approached by Edith Rigby to become a suffragette. Edith lead the Preston branch of the Women's Social and Political Union. Higginson attended meetings but did not initially want to get involved. However, by 1913 Edith Rigby was in hiding and the Preston branch was run by Higginson and Elizabeth Ellen (Beth) Hesmondhalgh. Higginson took over from Hesmondhalgh as honorary secretary in April 1914. The following month on the 21 May Higginson was in London trying with others to present their case to the King. The King refused to see them and the suffragettes were manhandled by the police. A notable photograph was taken of Higginson resisting arrest.

She was not arrested at this point but she ended up being armed with stones to protest at the King's refusal to see them. The stones had been delivered in two suitcases that had been filled in Southend-on-Sea. Many chose notable buildings but Higginson chose a pub because she remembered how drink had dominated her father's life. 67 people were arrested which included two men. Higginson was erroneously charged with breaking windows in Parliament Street and sentenced to four months in prison.

Higginson refused food in protest at not being treated as a political prisoner. She was temporarily released under the Cat and Mouse Act and then rearrested. The idea was to prevent suffragettes from having to be force-fed. She served a few more days in jail before she was again temporarily released. Her re arrest was prevented by a general amnesty declared by the government at the start of the war. The WSPU had agreed to a truce and in return all prisoners were released.

During the war Edith Rigby and Higginson made jam. Higginson's husband died in 1938 and Higginson spent the end of her life in Bognor Regis living with her former WSPU colleague Elizabeth Hesmondhalgh.

Higginson was interviewed about her experience in 1968 on BBC Radio 4's Woman's Hour. She died in Chichester in 1969.
