= Edith Rigby =

English suffragette (1872–1950)

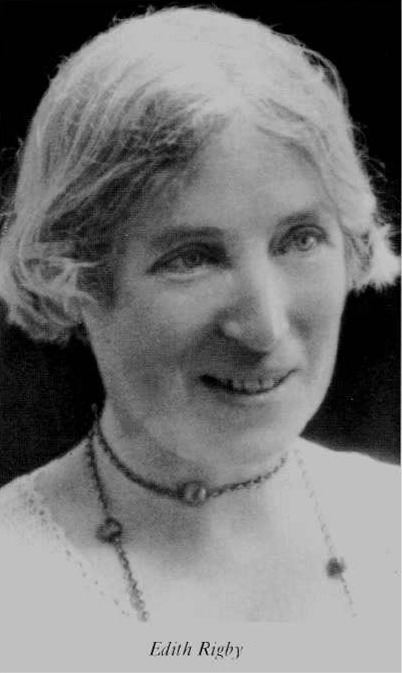
- Rigby in 1900
- Born: Edith Rayner; 18 October 1872; Preston, Lancashire, England
- Died: 23 July 1950 (aged 77); Llanrhos, Wales
- Education: Penrhos College
- Political party: Labour Party
- Spouse: Charles Rigby
- Children: 1

Edith Rigby (née Rayner) (18 October 1872 – 23 July 1950) was an English suffragette who used arson as a way to further the cause of women's suffrage. She founded a night school in Preston called St Peter's School, aimed at educating women and girls. Later she became a prominent activist, and was incarcerated seven times and committed several acts of arson. She was a contemporary of Christabel and Sylvia Pankhurst.

== Biography ==
Born Edith Rayner on St Luke's Day (18 October) in 1872 in Preston, Lancashire, she was one of seven children of Dr Alexander Clement Rayner and was educated at Penrhos College in North Wales.

She married Dr Charles Rigby and lived with him in Winckley Square in Preston. From an early age she questioned the differences between working-class and middle-class women and after she was married she worked hard to improve the lives of women and girls working in local mills. In 1899, she founded St Peter's School, which allowed these women to meet and continue their education which otherwise would have stopped at the age of 11. At home, she was critical of her neighbours' treatment of their servants. The Rigbys had servants themselves, but allowed them certain unconventional freedoms such as being able to eat in the dining-room and not having to wear uniforms.

=== Activism ===
In 1907 she formed the Preston branch of the Women's Social and Political Union (WSPU). Rigby was a suffragette recruiter, gathering new members from among the local Independent Labour Party. A fellow member, Eleanor Higginson, became a lifelong friend. Rigby took part in a march to the Houses of Parliament in London with Christabel and Sylvia Pankhurst in 1908. Fifty-seven women, including Rigby, were arrested and sentenced to a month in prison. In 1909 she was arrested again for obstruction during a visit by Winston Churchill. She was taken to court with Grace Alderman, Catherine Worthington and Beth Hesmondhalgh. They went to prison for seven days except for Rigby as her father paid the fine claiming that she was just in bad company of "hired women". Edith's brother Arther was reported to have pointed at another suffragette, Margaret Hewitt, saying that it was all due to "that painted jezebel".

When the 1911 census was enumerated, Rigby evaded by joining others at a house party in Manchester, possibly at the Dennison House party organised by Jessie Stephenson.

During later arrests and sentences, (seven in total) Rigby took part in hunger strikes and was subjected to force-feeding. Her activism included planting a bomb in the Liverpool Cotton Exchange on 5 July 1913, and although it was later stated in court that ‘no great damage had been done by the explosion’, Mrs Rigby was found guilty and sentenced to nine months' imprisonment with hard labour. Rigby was awarded a Hunger Strike Medal 'for Valour' by WSPU.

She also claimed to have set fire to the bungalow of Sir William Lever, Bt (later Lord Leverhulme), on 7 July 1913. The property, near Rivington Pike on the West Pennine Moors, contained a number of valuable paintings and the attack resulted in damage costing £20,000. Afterwards she said:

I want to ask Sir William Lever whether he thinks his property on Rivington Pike is more valuable as one of his superfluous houses occasionally opened to people, or as a beacon lighted to King and Country to see here are some intolerable grievances for women.

Rigby disagreed with the WSPU's decision not to campaign on suffrage issues during World War I. She joined the Independent Women's Social and Political Union split, forming a branch in Preston.

=== Later life ===
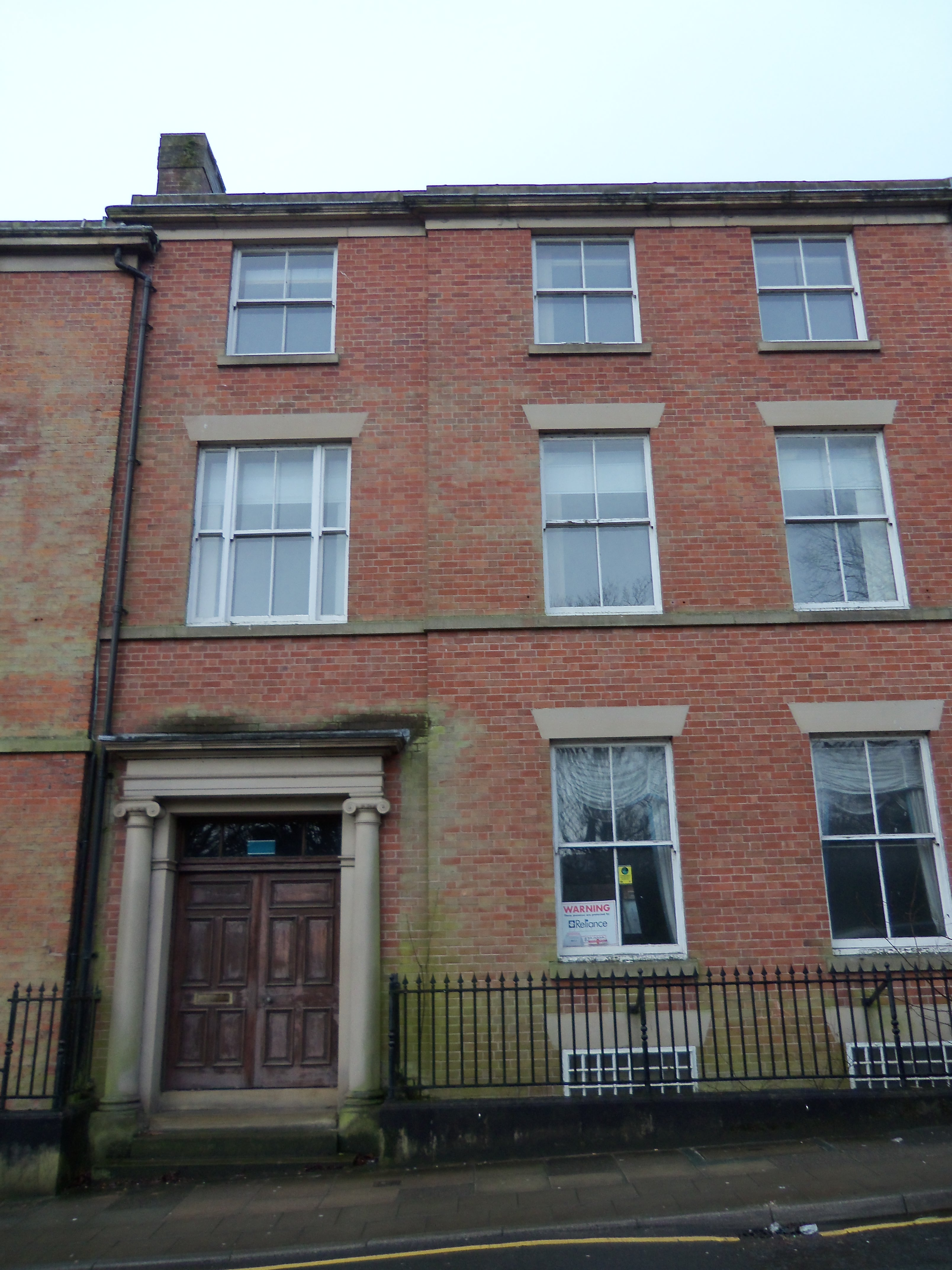
Edith Rigby's house, 28 Winckley Square, Preston

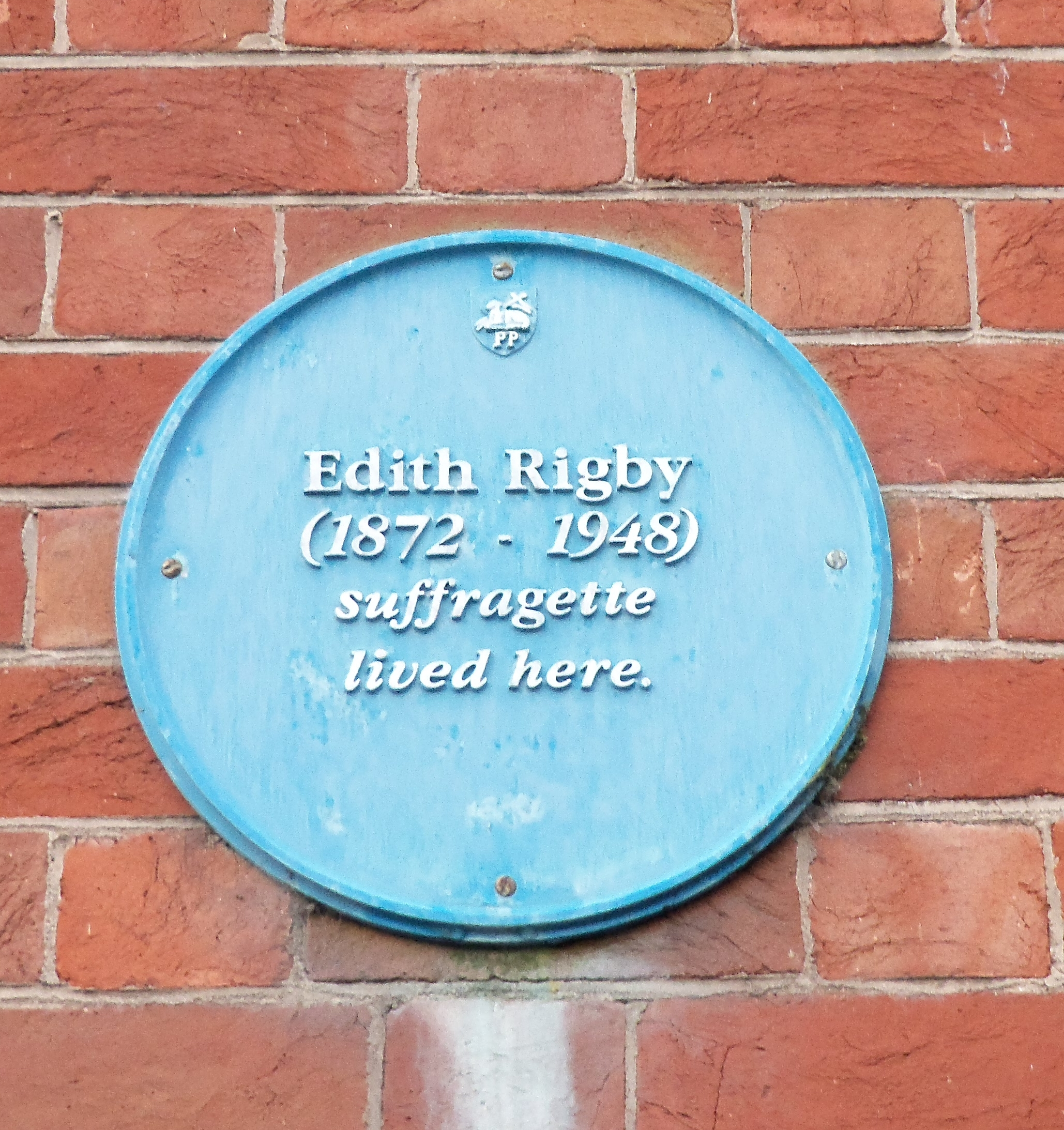
Rigby plaque in Winckley Square, Preston, featuring incorrect year of death

According to Elizabeth Ashworth in Champion Lancastrians, in 1888, Rigby was the first woman in Preston to own a bicycle. During World War I, she bought a cottage near Preston named Marigold Cottage and used it to produce food for the war effort. With short hair and wearing men's clothes, she grew fruit and vegetables and kept animals and bees, following the teachings of Rudolf Steiner. She had a happy marriage with her husband, who lived with her at her cottage. They adopted a son called Sandy. In the 1920s, Rigby was a founding member and the president of the Hutton and Howick Women's Institute. Rigby became a vegetarian.

In 1926, Charles Rigby retired and the couple built a new house, called Erdmuth, outside Llanrhos, North Wales. Charles died before it was finished, however, and Edith moved there alone at the end of 1926. She continued to follow Steiner's work, forming an "Anthroposophical Circle" of her own, and visiting one of his schools in New York. Into old age she enjoyed a healthy lifestyle, bathing in the sea, fell walking and meditating in the early hours of every morning. She eventually suffered from Parkinson's disease and died in 1950 at Erdmuth.

== See also ==
- History of feminism
- List of suffragists and suffragettes
- Women's suffrage in the United Kingdom
