= Notre Dame High School, Northampton =

School in Northampton, England

The Notre Dame High School in Northampton was a former all-female Roman Catholic (RC) direct grant grammar school.

== History ==
Notre Dame High School for Girls was an all female Roman Catholic direct grant school in Northampton, also known as a convent school. It was built in 1880 on Abington Street, and was run by the Sisters of Notre Dame de Namur in the Roman Catholic Diocese of Northampton, for girls aged 11–18. The building contained the school and the nuns' convent. A Chapel was attached and a small cemetery for the sisters was contained in the gardens. The associated junior school of St Mary's was at the rear of the main building and opened onto Lady's Lane.

A modern science block was opened in 1950.

There were around 500 girls at the school in the 1960s. Each year was divided into three forms or approximately 30 girls each. In the Second Year, the Forms were re-assigned according to ability and performance in Year One.

The students were divided into 6 Houses, each with a different coloured tie.

Silver - Trinity - The Holy Trinity

Red - Campion - Blessed Edmund Campion

Blue - Marion - The Virgin Mary

Green - Aquinas - St Thomas Aquinas

Yellow - Billart - Blessed Julie Billart

Purple - Lescher - Frances Lescher (Sr Mary of St Philip)

=== Closure ===
The school was closed in 1975, and the students transferred to St Thomas Becket Catholic School.

The site was bulldozed in 1979 and replaced with a row of shops. After the schools was demolished, the cemetery was cared for by the residents of the housing built on the Lady's Lane gardens.

=== Building ===
The building was across the road from the Andrew Carnegie public library.

Until 2020, nearby was the headquarters of the Motor Neurone Disease Association, situated close to the north. The building further down the road is now BBC Radio Northampton.

== Notable former pupils ==
- Paula Claire
