= Cardinal Newman College =

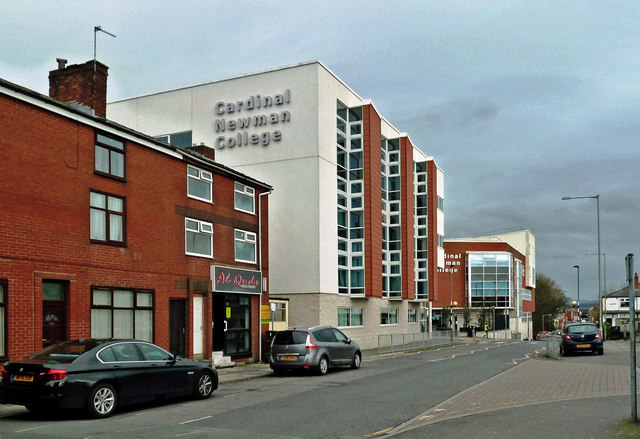
- View of the college (2019)

Location
- Lark Hill Road; Preston, Lancashire, PR1 4HD; England; 53.7566°N 2.6878°W

Information
- Type: Voluntary aided sixth form college
- Religious affiliation: Roman Catholic
- Established: 1978
- Local authority: Lancashire County Council
- Department for Education URN: 130745 Tables
- Principal: Nick Burnham
- Staff: 400
- Gender: mixed
- Age: 16+
- Enrolment: 3,500
- Website: www.cardinalnewman.ac.uk

Cardinal Newman College is a Catholic sixth form college close to the centre of Preston, Lancashire, England. The college was graded "outstanding" by Ofsted in February 2023.

== History ==
The college contains Lark Hill House, built in 1797 as private house for Samuel Horrocks, a cotton manufacturer and later Mayor and Member of Parliament for Preston. The house was unoccupied after the deaths of both Horrocks in 1842 and his son four years later, until 1860 when it was sold to the Faithful Companions of Jesus Sisters, to become Lark Hill House School for girls.

The house was modified in 1870, with more classrooms added in 1893, 1907, and 1932. The school was a direct grant grammar school for girls from 1919, known as Larkhill Convent Grammar School. From 1967, the school took in sixth form female students from other Catholic secondary schools around Preston. The introduction of comprehensive schools in Lancashire forced the school to stop admitting under-16 pupils from 1978.

In that year, the Lark Hill sixth form merged with the sixth forms of the other two Catholic grammar schools in Preston, namely Winckley Square Convent School and Preston Catholic College, to form Cardinal Newman College, named after John Henry Newman. Initially, the sites of all three former schools were used, but within a few years, the college was concentrated at the Lark Hill site.

However, the former Catholic College's playing fields, one mile (1½ km) south of the college, are still used by Newman College.

== Notable former students ==
- Guy Flanagan, actor
- Julie Atherton, actress
- Rae Morris, pop singer songwriter
- Hannah Britland, actress
- Dominic Lyne, author
- Clifford V. Johnson, physicist

=== Larkhill Convent ===
- Helen Southworth, former Labour MP for Warrington South
