= Winckley Square =

Garden square in Preston, Lancashire, England

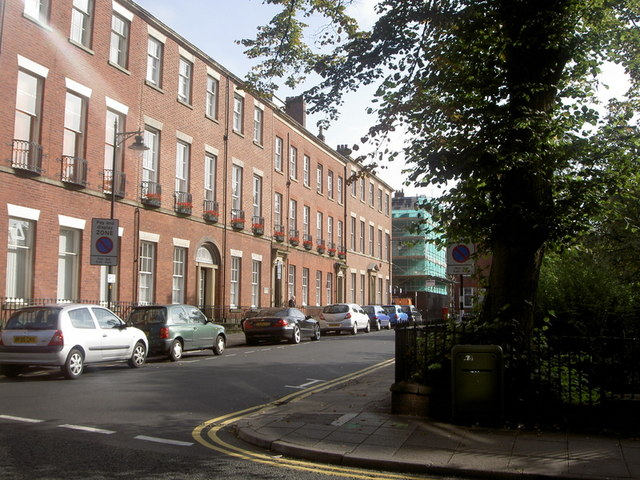
- Georgian buildings on the east side of Winckley Square

- Location within Preston city centre
- Location: Preston, Lancashire, England
- Coordinates: 53.756°N 2.702°W
- Operator: Preston City Council
- Website: www.winckleysquare.org.uk

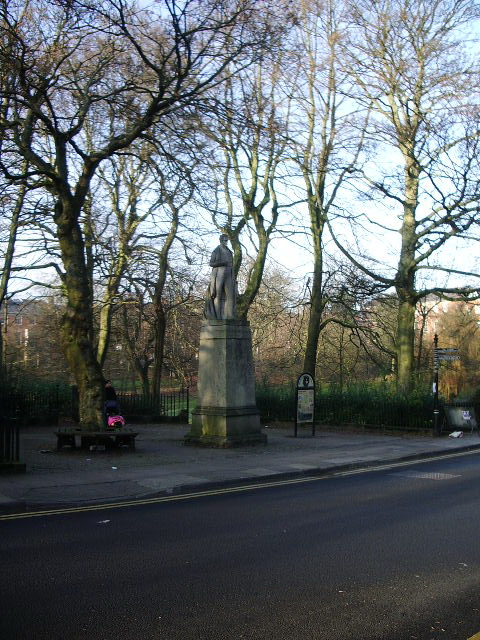
The statue of Robert Peel, at the east entrance to the square

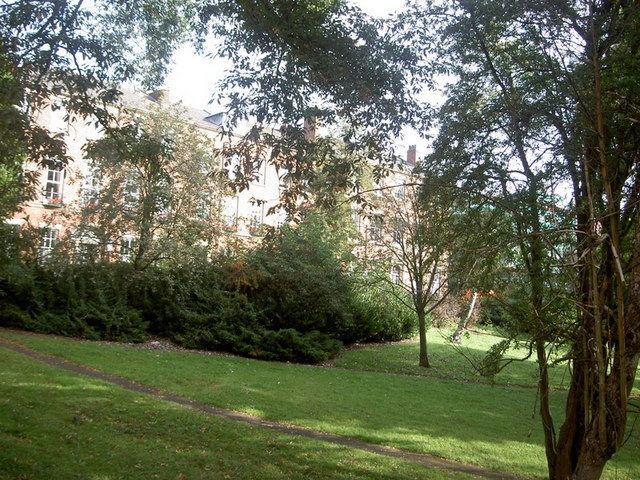
Winckley Square gardens

Winckley Square is situated near the centre of Preston, Lancashire, England, at the west end of Avenham.

The history of Winckley Square has been documented by Marian Roberts.

The square was first established in 1801, around Town End Field owned by Thomas Winckley, as an exclusive residential area for the town's gentry. It is now occupied mostly by insurance, legal and other business offices, although some residential developments have recently been made. The square's gardens, now an open public park, originally consisted of private plots, each owned by a resident. A statue of Sir Robert Peel by Preston-based sculptor Thomas Duckett Senior stands on one side of the central gardens opposite Cross Street, erected by public subscription in 1852.

An Italian-style villa was built in 1850 on the south corner of Cross Street (number 11), which was later used as a County Court office from the 1940s. It was demolished in 1969. On the opposite corner (number 10) was the Winckley Club, a gentlemen's club, and next to it, in Cross Street, the Literary and Philosophical Institution (later called Dr Shepherd's Library and Museum), both built in 1846 and both now demolished. The suffragette Edith Rigby lived at number 28.

Winckley Street lies between Winckley Square and Preston's main street of Fishergate. Today it is home to mainly professional and religious service providers, including solicitors practices, a translation company, a Jesuit presbytery (taking up the majority of the northern buildings adjacent to St Wilfrids Church) as well as restaurants.

== Schools ==
Winckley Square has been the home of several schools.

=== Preston Grammar School ===
Preston Grammar School dated back to the 15th century. In 1841 it moved to new premises in Cross Street next to the Philosophical Institution. In 1913 it relocated to Moor Park, and closed in 1967. It is not to be confused with the former Preston Grammar School in the market town of Stokesley, in North Yorkshire, nor with Preston Manor County Grammar School, in the residential area of Preston, in the London Borough of Brent.

==== Notable alumni ====
- Mahdi Al Tajir (born 1931), billionaire, Scotland's richest man
- Frederick Banister (1823–1897), civil engineer, Chief Engineer of the London, Brighton and South Coast Railway 1860–96
- Lawrence "Lawrie" Bond (1907–1974), designer of the Bond Minicar
- James Edgar Dandy, Keeper of Botany at Natural History Museum, London
- Sir John Eldon Gorst, Conservative MP for Chatham from 1875 to 1892 and Cambridge University from 1892 to 1906
- Sir John Holmes GCVO CMG, Ambassador to France from 2001 to 2007 and to Portugal from 1999 to 2001
- Sir John Lockwood, Master of Birkbeck College, 1951–65; Vice-Chancellor of the University of London, 1955–58
- Herbert Ponting, photographer, best known for his photographs of Captain Robert Scott's Terra Nova expedition and of Japan.
- John Preston, Chaplain-in-Ordinary and Master of Emmanuel College, Cambridge
- Sir George Toulmin, Liberal MP for Bury from 1902 to 1918
- Charles Wilfred Valentine, Professor of Education at the University of Birmingham from 1919 to 1946 and President of the British Psychological Society from 1947 to 1949

=== Preston High School and Park School ===
Preston High School for Girls once occupied 5 Winckley Square. It was superseded in 1907 by the Park School for Girls, which educated younger girls in Winckley Square and older girls in Moor Park Avenue. It closed in 1967.

=== Preston Catholic College ===
Preston Catholic College was a Jesuit school for boys, which opened in 1865 and closed in 1978, when its sixth form merged with Winckley Square Convent School and Larkhill Convent Grammar School to form Cardinal Newman College. At its peak in 1970, it occupied most of the west side of Winckley Square. Alumni include television football pundit Mark Lawrenson and head of the Royal Shakespeare Company, Gregory Doran.

=== Winckley Square Convent School ===
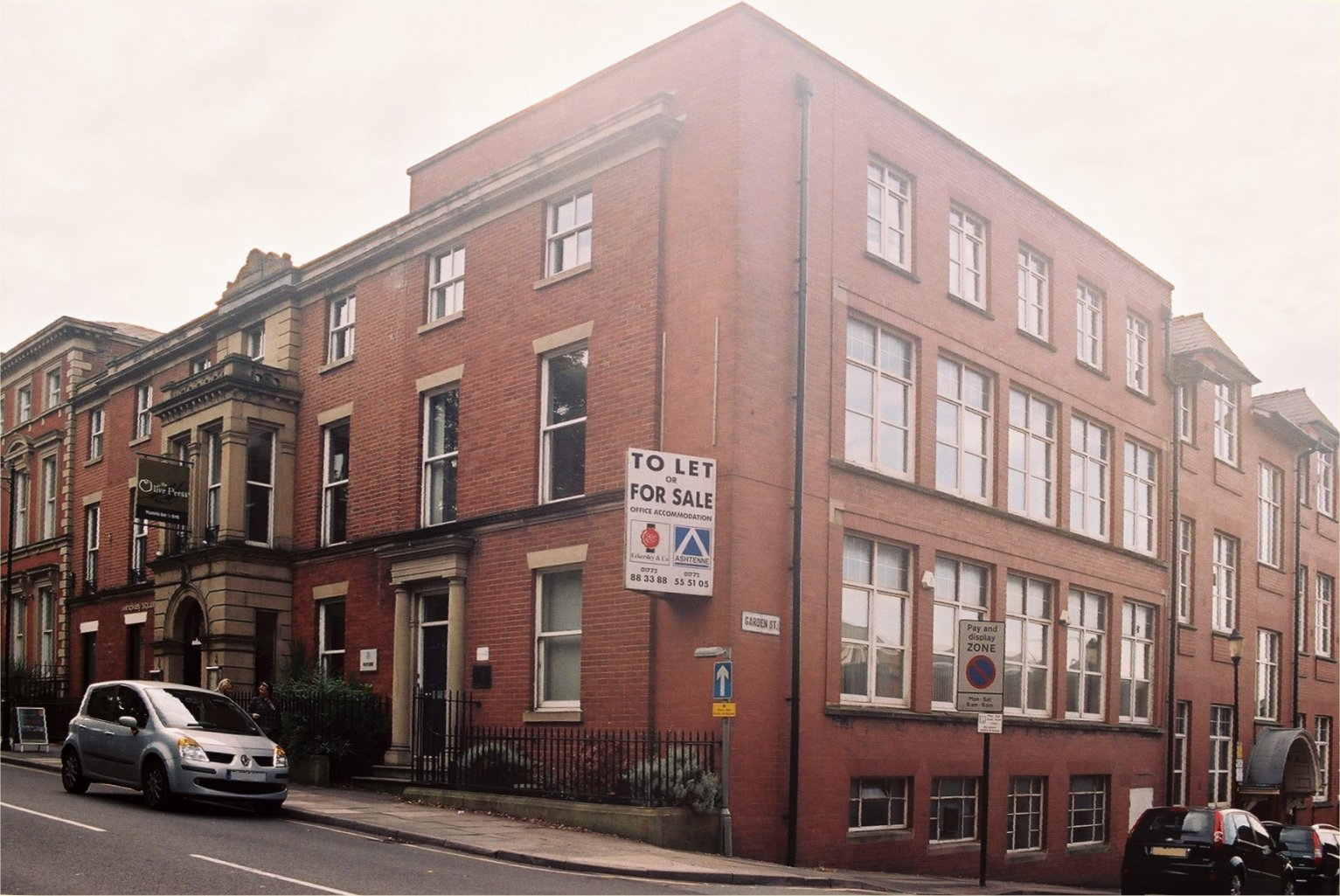
Former convent school, on the corner of Garden Street, 2007

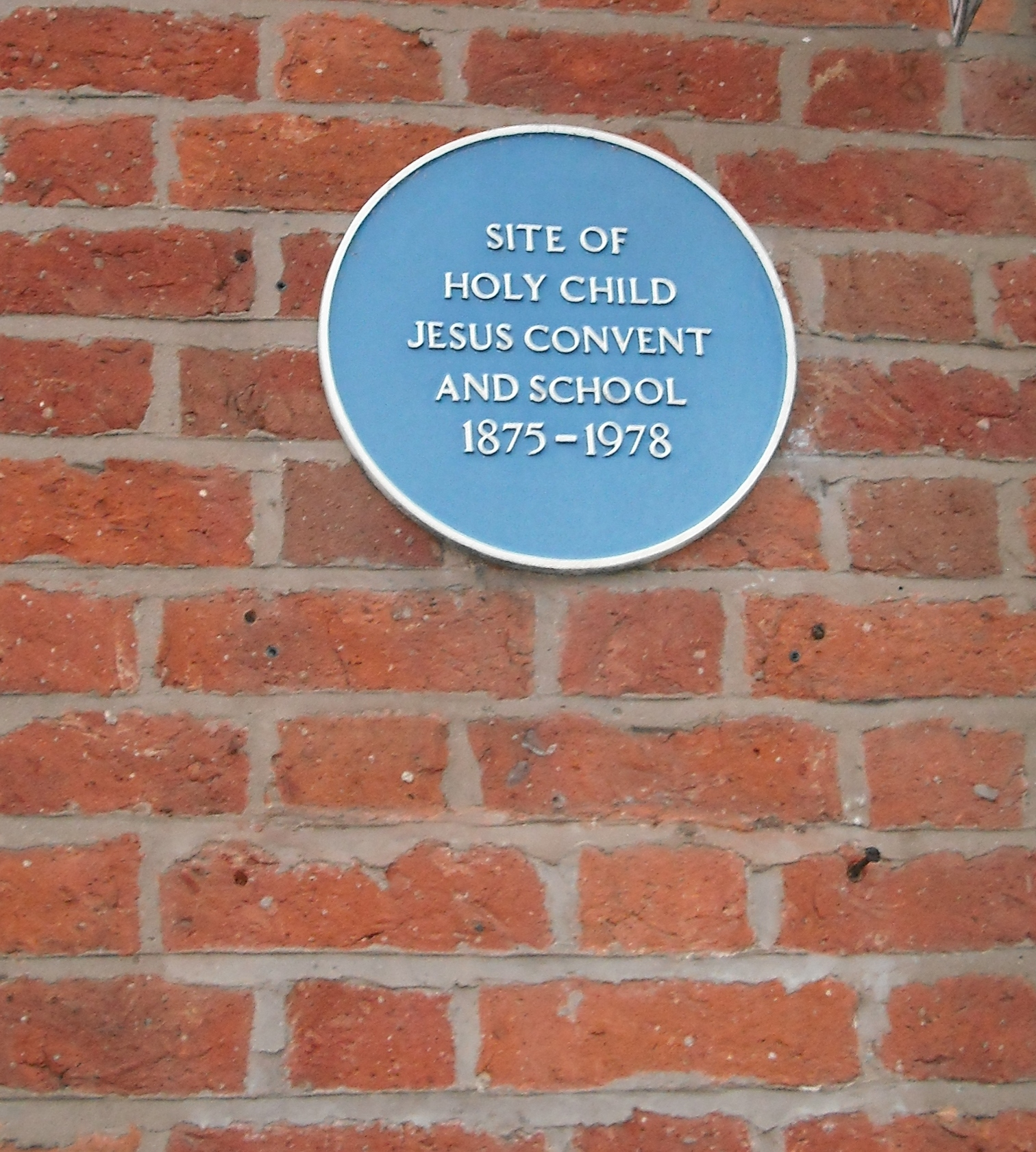
Plaque on the site of the Holy Child Jesus Convent

In 1875, the Society of the Holy Child Jesus formed a girls' convent school from the merger of its three convent schools, St. Walburge's of 1853, St Mary's of 1871 and English Martyr's of 1871. The new school was at 23 Winckley Square, the former home of Thomas Batty Addison, once the Recorder of Preston. As the school grew, it came to fill the whole block between the streets of East Cliff and Garden Street, reaching a peak of 850 pupils in 1962. In 1978 it suffered the same fate as the neighbouring Catholic College, the site closing in 1981. The buildings are now used as offices and a Paul Heathcote restaurant.
