= Charles Berington =

English Roman Catholic bishop

- Vicar Apostolic of Midland District
- Church: Catholic Church
- See: Apostolic Vicariate of the Midland District
- In office: 24 February 1795 – 8 June 1798
- Predecessor: Thomas Talbot
- Successor: Gregory Stapleton
- Other post: Titular Bishop of Hierocaesarea (1786-1798)
- Previous post: Coadjutor Vicar Apostolic of the Midland District (1786-1795)

Orders
- Ordination: 1775
- Consecration: 1 August 1786 by Thomas Talbot

Personal details
- Born: 1748 Stock, Essex, Kingdom of Great Britain
- Died: 8 June 1798 (aged 49–50) near Wolverhampton, Staffordshire, Kingdom of Great Britain

Styles of Charles Berington
- Reference style: The Right Reverend
- Spoken style: My Lord or Bishop

Charles Berington (b. at Stock, Essex, England, 1748; d. 8 June 1798) was an English Roman Catholic bishop who served as the Vicar Apostolic of the Midland District from 1795 to 1798.

== Life ==
At thirteen Berington was sent to the English College at Douai. Four years later he was removed and sent to St. Gregory's Seminary, Paris. According to his cousin, Joseph Berington, he did little better at Paris than at Douai, though he succeeded in taking his doctorate at the Sorbonne in 1776. On his return to England, he became chaplain at Ingatestone Hall, a few miles from his birthplace. After travelling for two years with young Giffard of Chillington, on his return, Berington was appointed coadjutor to Bishop Thomas Talbot, Vicar Apostolic of the Midland District, becoming at the same time Titular Bishop of Hiero-Caesarea.

The Midland District, one of the four into which for ecclesiastical purposes England was then divided, was at that time the stronghold of Cisalpinist opinions. With these Charles Berington was in full sympathy, in consequence of which, in 1788, he was elected a member of the Catholic Committee, who were then agitating for the repeal of the Penal Laws, for which end they were unfortunately willing to minimize some of their Catholic principles. Two other ecclesiastics were elected at the same time, Joseph Wilkes and Bishop James Talbot, Vicar Apostolic of the London District, though the latter's appointment was merely nominal, for he never attended the meetings. Berington took a leading part in the disputes which followed between the Committee and the bishops, and though his sympathies were chiefly with the former, he exerted a restraining influence on them, and was ever trying to bring about an understanding between the two contending parties.

He signed his name to the documents which appeared in the official publications of the Committee known as the "Blue Books", and he defended the oath intended to be imposed by Parliament on the Catholics, which was afterwards condemned by the Holy See. In the midst of these disputes Bishop James Talbot died, and endeavours were made by the Committee to secure the appointment of Berington in his place, so that he might reside in London and exert the influence attached to the position. These endeavours failed, and John Douglass was appointed Vicar Apostolic. Some of the more extreme laymen, however, maintained that they had a right to choose their own bishop, and called upon the Catholic body to disavow the prelate appointed by Rome, and to rally round Berington; but he published a letter in which he refused to have anything to do with these machinations.

Talbot died in 1795, and Charles Berington succeeded as Vicar Apostolic of the Midland District. Again he appeared to have a career before him. Before giving him his special faculties, however, Rome called upon him to withdraw his signature from the Blue Books. For several years he demurred, being still under Cisalpine influence. At length, through the intervention of Charles Erskine, who was living in England as an informal papal envoy, Berington was induced to sign the necessary retraction, on 11 October 1797. After some delay due to the disturbed state of Rome, his faculties were sent, but they never reached him, for he died suddenly of apoplexy while riding home from Sedgley Park School.

== Sources ==
- Charles Butler, Hist. Memoirs of English Catholics;
- John Milner, Supplem. Memoirs;
- Joseph Gillow, Bibl. Dict. Eng. Cath.;
- Amherst, History of Catholic Emancipation;
- Husenbeth, Life of Milner;
- Brady, Episcopal Succession in England and Ireland, etc.

Catholic Church titles
Preceded by Thomas Joseph Talbot	Vicar Apostolic of the Midland District; 1795–1798	Succeeded by Gregory Stapleton
