= James Waterworth =

James Waterworth (1806 in St Helens, Lancashire – 1876) was an English Catholic missionary priest.

== Life ==
James Waterworth was educated at Stonyhurst College and went subsequently to Montrouge to enter the novitiate of the Society of Jesus, in which he did not long continue. He was sent by John Milner, the Vicar Apostolic of the Midland District to study for the priesthood at the English College, Rome. There Waterworth devoted himself to theology, and especially patrology, often working sixteen hours a day. At the end of his course he was recalled to Oscott, where he was ordained, and where he taught theology from 1830 to 1833.

Waterworth then went to assist J. Yver at Newark, where he spent over forty years as a missionary priest, still continuing his studies of the Church Fathers. Within a year or two he was placed in sole charge of the mission. He was made canon of Nottingham in 1852, doctor of divinity in 1860, and provost of that diocese in 1861.

== Works ==
In 1834, Waterworth published a pamphlet defending Joseph Berington and John Kirk's work, The Faith of Catholics, against criticisms from the Anglican clergyman Richard Thomas Pembroke Pope; and twelve years later he published an enlarged edition in three volumes.

He also published a translation of the canons and decrees of the Council of Trent (1848) and of François Véron's Rule of Faith (1833). His Digest of the Penal Laws affecting Roman Catholics is another work.

Waterworth's last book, England and Rome (1854), was on the relations of the popes to England.

- «The canons and decrees of the sacred and oecumenical Council of Trent, celebrated under the sovereign pontiffs Paul III, Julius III and Pius IV» London : C. Dolman, 1848

== Death ==
Waterworth died in Old Hall, Newark-on-Trent on 28 March 1876.

Attribution
