= John Hornyold =

British bishop

- Vicar Apostolic of Midland District
- Church: Catholic Church
- See: Apostolic Vicariate of the Midland District
- In office: 29 March 1756 – 26 December 1778
- Predecessor: John Stonor
- Successor: Thomas Talbot
- Other post: Titular Bishop of Philomelium (1751-1778)
- Previous post: Coadjutor Vicar Apostolic of the Midland District (1751-1756)

Orders
- Ordination: 22 December 1736 by François de Baglion de La Salle
- Consecration: 20 February 1752 by John Stonor

Personal details
- Born: 19 February 1706
- Died: 26 December 1778 (aged 72) Longbirch (Wolverhampton), Staffordshire, Kingdom of Great Britain

John Joseph Hornyold (19 February 1706 – 26 December 1778) was an English Catholic bishop, titular Bishop of Phiomelia, and Vicar Apostolic of the Midland District, England for twenty-two years.

== Life ==
Hornyold was descended from two ancient Catholic families, his father being John Hornyold, of Blackmore Park and Hanley Castle, Worcestershire; his mother, Mary, daughter of Pyers Mostyn, 2nd Baronet, of Talacre, Flintshire. At the age of 22, on 7 August 1758, he entered the English College at Douai to study for the priesthood. After his ordination he returned to England and served the mission at Grantham for some time, meeting with persecution and more than once narrowly escaping arrest as a priest.

In 1739, Hornyold went as chaplain to Longbirch near Wolverhampton, the seat of "the good Madam Giffard", a widow. When the priest-hunters would search for him, he would conceal himself at one of the Longbirch farms. While there he published his first work, The Decalogue Explained, published in London in 1744, and afterwards running through many editions. Bishop John Milner, in a Memoir of him in the Laity's Directory (1818), says: "This was so generally approved of, that he received something like official thanks from Oxford for the publication. It was not to be expected, however, that he should be thanked from that quarter for his other works, which appeared in succession, on the Sacraments and on the Creed."

In the former of these, The Sacraments Explained (London, 1747), Hornyold included several discourses written by his predecessor at Longbirch, John Johnson. The book on the Creed was called The Real Principles of Catholicks or a Catechism for the Adult (London, 1749), One of the later editions appeared as Grounds of the Christian Belief or the (Apostles') Creed Explained (Birmingham, 1771). In this book, according to Charles Butler, he made large use of Maurus Corker's Roman Catholic Principles in Reference to God and the King, but this was denied by Milner.

In 1751 John Talbot Stonor, the Vicar Apostolic of the Midland District, applied for a coadjutor and Hornyold was selected. He was consecrated 10 February 1752, but continued to act as Giffard's chaplain until her death, 13 February, 1753. Her house was then rented for the use of the vicar Apostolic and Hornyold resided there for the rest of his life.

On Stonor's death, 29 March 1756, Hornyold succeeded as Vicar Apostolic of the Midland District, which comprised sixteen counties. In 1766, as his health was failing, he obtained Thomas Talbot as his coadjutor, and consecrated him in 1767 (not in 1776 as has been erroneously asserted, in consequence of a misprint in Milner's "Memoir"). In 1768 he undertook the responsibility of carrying on Sedgley Park School, which had been founded, on the initiative of his intimate friend Bishop Challoner, six years previously, and thus preserved it for the Church. He lived just long enough to see the Papists Act 1778, died at Longbirch, Staffordshire, and was buried in Brewood churchyard, Staffordshire. There is an oil painting of the bishop at the family seat, Blackmore Park, Worcestershire.

== Sources ==
- John Milner, Memoir of Bishop Hornyold in Laity's Directory (London, 1818), with portrait; Orthodox Journal (1834), III, with rough woodcut;
- Joseph Gillow, Bibl. Dict. Eng. Cath., s. v.;
- John Kirk, Biographies of English Catholics, s. v., contains reprint of Memoir by Milner (London, 1909);
- Edwin Burton, Life and Times of Bishop Challoner, with the Blackmore Park portrait (London, 1909).

Catholic Church titles
Preceded by John Talbot Stonor	Vicar Apostolic of the Midland District; 1756–1778	Succeeded by Thomas Joseph Talbot
