= Maurus Corker =

English Benedictine

Maurus Corker (baptised James; 1636 – 22 December 1715) was an English Benedictine who was falsely accused and imprisoned as a result of the fabricated Popish Plot, but was acquitted of treason and eventually released.

== Life ==
He was born in Yorkshire. His baptismal name was James: he took the name Maurus when he entered the Benedictine order. On 23 April 1656, he took vows at the English Benedictine house Lamspringe Abbey near Hildesheim, in Germany, and returned to England as a missionary in 1665.

== Popish Plot ==
Being accused by Titus Oates of collusion in the Popish Plot, (which was in fact Oates's own invention), he was imprisoned in Newgate Prison, but was acquitted of treason by a London jury, 18 July 1679. His acquittal was due in part to his own eloquent defence (he has been described as one of the ablest priests of his generation), and in part due to his good fortune in being tried with Sir George Wakeman, personal physician to Queen Catherine of Braganza. The Crown was determined to save Wakeman, and Lord Chief Justice William Scroggs, formerly a firm believer in the Plot, now turned on Oates and the other informers, denouncing them as liars. Despite his notorious antipathy to Catholic priests, Scroggs made no effort to distinguish between Wakeman and the three priests who were tried with him, warning the jury that no accused person, priest or layman, should suffer death for treason if there was any doubt as to their guilt.

Corker was returned to prison, and was then arraigned for acting as a priest within England, an offence which carried the death penalty under the Jesuits, etc. Act 1584, although after the death of Elizabeth I the law had fallen into disuse until the advent of the Popish Plot. He was tried with six others, including the leading Dominican Lionel Anderson, and the colourful, one-legged Civil War veteran Colonel Henry Starkey. One of the seven, David Kemiss (or Kemish), was found unfit to plead on the grounds of his great age and ill health, while another, Alexander Lumsden, was acquitted, on the ground that he was a Scot, not an Englishman, and therefore could not be said to have "acted as a priest in England" within the meaning of the Jesuits, etc. Act 1584.

The other accused, including Corker, were found guilty and sentenced to death under the Jesuits, etc. Act 1584 on 17 January 1680. Through influential friends Corker was granted a reprieve (in fact it does not seem that any of the convicted priests were executed, and the aged David Kemiss was allowed to die in prison) and he was detained in Newgate. While thus confined he is said in some reports to have converted more than a thousand Protestants to Catholicism.

== After the Plot ==
One of his fellow prisoners at Newgate was Oliver Plunkett, Archbishop of Armagh, with whom he formed a close friendship, and whom he prepared for his execution, which took place on 11 July 1681. Some correspondence which was carried on in prison between these two was later published. On the accession of James II of England in 1685, Father Corker was released and kept at the court as resident ambassador of Prince-Bishop Ferdinand of Bavaria, the Elector of Cologne. In 1687 he erected the little convent of St. John at Clerkenwell, where religious services were held for the public, but which was destroyed by a mob, on 11 November 1688, during the Glorious Revolution. Father Corker himself was obliged to seek refuge on the continent. In 1691 he was made Abbot of Cismar Abbey near Lübeck and, two years later, of Lamspringe, where he had made his religious profession. In 1696 he resigned as abbot and returned to England to continue his missionary work. He died in Paddington.

== Works ==
He was the author of various pamphlets on the innocence of those condemned for implication in the Popish Plot.

A treatise Roman Catholick Principles in reference to God and the King ran to dozens of editions and caused controversy among English Catholics in the nineteenth century, over the issue of the accuracy with which it represented Catholic doctrine. It first appeared as a small pamphlet in 1680, and at least two other editions of it were published in that year. It is reprinted in Stafford's Memoires. Six editions of the Principles were published before 1684, and six were published by Goter in 1684–6 at the end of his Papist misrepresented and represented. William Coppinger gave at least twelve editions of the 'Principles, first in his Exposition, and afterwards in his True Piety. Eleven or twelve more editions were published between 1748 and 1813, and a reprint appeared in the Pamphleteer in 1819, and again with the title of The Catholic Eirenicon, in friendly response to Dr. Pusey, London 1865. On reading it Dr. Leland, the historian, is said to have declared that if such were the principles of Catholics no government had any right to quarrel with them. Charles Butler, who reprinted it, declared it to be a clear and accurate exposition of the Catholic creed on some of its most important principles. John Milner, however, asserted in an official charge to his clergy in 1813 that it "is not an accurate exposition of Roman catholic principles, and still less the faith of catholics". Butler claimed that John Joseph Hornyold had used Corker's work in his The Real Principles of Catholicks (1749), but Milner denied this. In consequence of some exceptions taken against the accuracy of the 'Propositions' which form the heading of The Faith of Catholics by Joseph Berington and John Kirk, Kirk reprinted Corker's treatise in 1815.
