= Frederick Charles Husenbeth =

English Catholic priest and writer

Frederick Charles Husenbeth (born at Bristol, 30 May 1796; died at Costessey, Norfolk, 31 October 1872) was an English Catholic priest and writer.

== Life ==
The son of a Bristol wine-merchant, who had emigrated from Mannheim, Germany, and his wife, Elizabeth James, of a lady of Cornish family. A convert to Catholicism, he was sent at the age of seven to Sedgley Park School in Staffordshire, and at fourteen entered his father's counting-house. Having formed the resolution, three years later, to study for the priesthood, he returned to Sedgley, going afterwards to Oscott College, where he was ordained by John Milner in 1820.

After serving the Stourbridge mission, near Oscott, for a time, he was sent to Cossey Hall, Norfolk, as chaplain to Sir George Stafford Jerningham, who became 8th Baron Stafford in 1824. Husenbeth took up his residence in a cottage in the village, and continued his ministrations there to the Catholics of the mission until within a few months of his death.

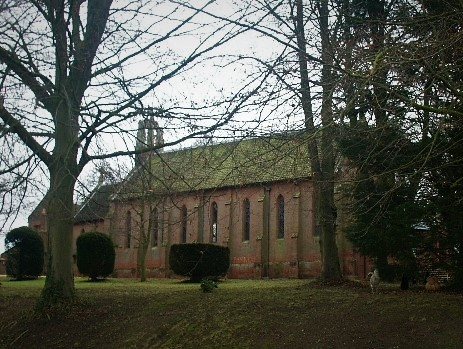
Catholic church of St Walstan, Costessey

During this long period, extending over more than half a century, he is said to have been absent from his mission only on three Sundays. Seven years after his appointment to Cossey he became grand vicar under Bishop Walsh, successor of Bishop Milner as Vicar Apostolic of the Midland District. In 1841 he opened St. Walstan's Chapel, for which he had collected funds, and in 1850 he received the degree of Doctor of Divinity from Rome.

Shortly after the restoration of the English hierarchy by Pope Pius IX, Husenbeth was elected provost of the Chapter of Northampton, and Vicar-General of the diocese. In the spring of 1872 he resigned his mission, and he died at St. Walstan's Presbytery on the last day of October in the same year.

Husenbeth is described as having a singularly kind heart, agreeable manners, conversational powers of a high order, and a sense of humour which made him a very pleasant companion. He had no particular liking for religious institutes, and was quite opposed to the new forms of devotion which had grown up since his student days at Oscott.

== Works ==
Between 1823 and 1849, forty-nine works written or edited by him appeared in London, Dublin, and Norwich. Many of these were controversial publications, written in refutation of George Stanley Faber and Joseph Blanco White, while others treated of historical, liturgical, or doctrinal matters. In 1852, he brought out, assisted by John Polding, a new edition, with abridged notes, of George Leo Haydock's illustrated Bible and he published also editions, for the use of the laity, of the Missal and the vesper book. He translated a number of hymns from Latin to English.

The "Emblems of Saints" (1850) was one of his best original works, and the style of his pulpit eloquence is well shown by the various sermons which he printed from time to time. He contributed a large number of uncollected verses to the periodicals of his time. He also published articles on a great variety of subjects in different Catholic journals, and was a lifelong writer in the columns of Notes and Queries, in which more than thirteen hundred contributions appeared over his initials. He was a voluminous letter-writer, and maintained a correspondence with various literary celebrities, and with many distinguished converts of his time.

Husenbeth's valuable library collection of crucifixes, reliquaries and similar objects and of letters chiefly on religious subjects, were sold at Norwich a few months after his death. Most of the letters passed into the possession of the Bishop of Northampton.

== Sources ==
- John Dalton, Funeral Sermon (with memoir prefixed) (London, 1872);
- George Oliver, Collection illustrating the History of the Catholic Religion (London, 1857), 331;
- Joseph Gillow, Bibl. Dict. Eng Cath. (London), III, 493 sqq.:
- The Oscotian, new series, IV, 253; V, 30; Vl, 59;
- The Tablet, XL, 593, 628;
- Notes and Queries, 4th series, X, 365, 388, 441.
