= John Douglass (bishop) =

English bishop (1743–1812)

The Right Reverend John Douglass
- Vicar Apostolic of the London District
- Church: Roman Catholic Church
- Appointed: 10 September 1790
- Term ended: 8 May 1812
- Predecessor: James Robert Talbot
- Successor: William Poynter
- Other post: Titular Bishop of Centuria

Orders
- Consecration: 19 December 1790 by William Gibson

Personal details
- Born: December 1743 Yarm, Yorkshire
- Died: 8 May 1812 (aged 68)
- Denomination: Roman Catholic

John Douglass (December 1743–8 May 1812) was an English Catholic prelate who served as Vicar Apostolic of the London District from 1790 until his death in 1812.

== Life ==
The son of John Douglass and Brigit Senson or Semson, he was born at Yarm, Yorkshire, in December 1743, and at the age of thirteen he was sent to the English College, Douai. There he took the college oath in 1764. He went to the English College in Valladolid, as professor of humanities, arriving there 27 June 1768. At a later period he taught philosophy. Suffering from poor health, he left Valladolid on 30 July 1773, and was priest of the mission of Linton and afterwards at York.

=== Vicar apostolic ===
While he was a missioner at York he was selected by the Holy See for the London vicariate, in opposition to efforts made by the "catholic committee" to have Charles Berington translated from the Midland to the London district. The appointment caused controversy, and Berington addressed a printed letter to the London clergy, resigning every pretension to the London vicariate. Opposition to Douglass was withdrawn, and he succeeded James Talbot as vicar-apostolic of the London district. His briefs to the titular see of Centurio were dated 25 September 1790, and he was consecrated 19 December the same year, in St. Mary's Church, Lulworth Castle, Dorset, by William Gibson, titular bishop of Acanthus, and Vicar Apostolic of the Northern District. The London District included the home counties, the West Indies with the exception of Trinidad, and the Channel Islands of Jersey and Guernsey.

The Catholic Relief Act, passed in June 1791, repealed the statutes of recusancy in favour of persons taking the Irish oath of allegiance of 1778. It was Douglass who suggested that this oath should replace the oath which was proposed during the debates on the measure and warmly discussed by the contending parties. The act likewise repealed the oath of supremacy imposed in the reign of William and Mary, as well as various declarations and disabilities, and it tolerated the schools and religious worship of Roman Catholics. He was a determined opponent of the royal veto of the appointment of bishops.

St. Edmund's College, Old Hall Green, owed its existence to Douglass, with its president Gregory Stapleton settling there with his students at his invitation from 15 August 1795, after their imprisonment during the French Revolution. Douglass also had to deal with the influx of French Catholics fleeing the Reign of Terror. By 1794, there were 1,500 French priests in London, for whom Douglass established eight French chapels. Most of the French clergy returned to France by 1805. He censured the Blanchardists who refused to accept the Concordat.

Douglass was one of the first members of the "Roman Catholic Meeting", organised in May 1794 in opposition to the Cisalpine Club. John Milner submitted his Letters to a Prebendary to Douglass for revision. Douglass erased nearly one-half of the original contents before sending it back to the author, who printed the work in its curtailed form.

Douglass died at his residence in Castle Street, Holborn, on 8 May 1812. William Poynter, who had been appointed his coadjutor in 1803, succeeded him in the vicariate-apostolic of the London district.

== Works ==
An account by Douglass of the state of the catholic religion in his vicariate in 1796 is printed in Brady's Episcopal Succession, iii. 180 seq. He published some charges and several pastorals, two of which were translated into Spanish. He also for many years published "A New Year's Gift" in the Laity's Directory.

Catholic Church titles
Preceded by James Robert Talbot	Vicar Apostolic of the London District; 1790–1812	Succeeded by William Poynter
