= John Stonor =

John Stonor may refer to:

- Sir John Stonor (judge) (1281–1354), English Chief Justice of the Common Pleas
- John Stonor (bishop) (1678–1756), English Roman Catholic Vicar Apostolic
