= John Milner (bishop) =

English Roman Catholic bishop

The Right Reverend John Milner
- Vicar Apostolic of the Midland District
- Church: Roman Catholic Church
- Appointed: 6 March 1803
- Term ended: 19 April 1826
- Predecessor: Gregory Stapleton
- Successor: Thomas Walsh
- Other post: Titular Bishop of Castabala

Orders
- Ordination: 21 December 1776
- Consecration: 22 May 1803 by John Douglass

Personal details
- Born: 14 October 1752 Holborn, London, England
- Died: 19 April 1826 (aged 73) Wolverhampton, West Midlands, England
- Buried: St Peter and St Paul's Church, Wolverhampton
- Denomination: Roman Catholic
- Parents: Joseph and Helen Milner (or Millner)

John Milner (14 October 1752 – 19 April 1826) was an English Roman Catholic bishop and controversialist who served as the Vicar Apostolic of the Midland District from 1803 to 1826.

== Early life ==
Milner was born and baptized on 14 October 1752 in London, son of Joseph and Helen Miller, of Lancashire. Milner attended school first at Edgebaston, and then at age twelve at Sedgley Park School, but the following year, on the recommendation of Bishop Richard Challoner, he was sent to the English College at Douai, France, to study for the priesthood. He remained there for twelve years. Upon his ordination to the priesthood in 1777 he returned to England and, at first, lived in London, in Gray's Inn, having no permanent appointment, but being what was familiarly called among the Catholic clergy of that time "a jobber", serving as a supply priest when and where required.

Two years later he was sent to Winchester to replace the Catholic missioner, Nolan, who had died of a malignant fever while ministering to the hundreds of French Catholic prisoners of war then confined in the city gaol.

== Winchester ==
Winchester was then one of the few towns in the south of England where a Catholic chapel had been openly supported since the latter part of the 17th century. The saying of Mass there was technically illegal, for the penal laws prohibiting the saying of Mass were not repealed until the Roman Catholic Relief Act 1791 (31 Geo. 3. c. 32); but practically there was not much prospect of Catholics being interfered with. The facilities at Winchester, however, were quite inconvenient and insecure, Masses being celebrated either in the priest's house (called "St Peter's House") or in a kind of shed at the end of the garden behind it. Under Milner's guidance, the decision was taken to build a Catholic chapel in the "light gothic style" at a time when most ecclesiastical architecture in England was neo-classical, and when Catholic chapels rarely aspired to any style at all. In Milner's own words:

This measure being resolved upon, instead of the following the modern style of building churches and chapels, which are in general square chambers, with small sash windows and fashionable decorations, hardly to be distinguished, when the altars and benches are removed, from common assembly rooms; it was concluded upon to imitate the models in this kind, which have been left us by our religious ancestors, who applied themselves with such ardor and unrivalled success to the cultivation and perfection of ecclesiastical architecture. [History of Winchester, P. II. ch. xii]

The chapel, erected behind St Peter's House, out of sight from the road, was dedicated to the Virgin Mary to the saints Peter, Birinus and Swithun. It was consecrated by Bishop Douglass, Vicar Apostolic of the London District, on 6 December 1792. It is now beside St Peter's Catholic Church.

Milner remained in Winchester for 23 years, during which time, apart from building the chapel, he devoted himself to missionary work and established a school. The English convents in France and the Low Countries were breaking up, and the nuns fled for refuge to their own country. Milner established in his mission the Benedictine nuns, formerly of Brussels. The Franciscans from Bruges likewise settled at Winchester.

During succeeding years, Milner began to make his name as a writer and controversialist. The Cisalpine movement among the Catholic laity was beginning, the moving spirit being a nephew of Alban Butler, Charles Butler, a lawyer of eminence and reputation, and the lifelong opponent of Milner. The movement also affected some of the clergy, Joseph Berington being the most notable example. Milner directed all his endeavours to combating this movement.

== Towards Catholic emancipation ==
William Pitt, as Prime Minister, promised to introduce a bill of Catholic relief; but when it was drafted, it contained an oath which all Catholics were to be called upon to take, based on the "protestation", but in stronger language, and containing doctrine to which no good Catholic could set his name; while the Catholics throughout were called "Protesting Catholic Dissenters". The four vicars apostolic met at Hammersmith, in October 1789, Milner attending as theological adviser. They unanimously condemned the oath and the new appellation.

The committee now suggested some modification of the oath; but it was not sufficient to free it from objection, and three out of the four vicars Apostolic joined in condemning it a second time. When the Relief Bill was brought forward in February 1791, the bishops called Milner to their assistance. By means of his action an impression was made on the Government and the oath was further modified; but the situation was really changed after his return to Winchester, when the House of Lords, at the instigation of the Protestant Anglican Bishop of St. David's, substituted a totally different oath for the one objected to; and in this form the Bill was passed. It abolished the penal laws properly so-called and legalised the celebration of Mass; but Catholics continued liable to numerous disabilities for many years afterwards.

After this the Catholic Committee dissolved; but the chief members re-formed themselves into an association to which they gave the name of the Cisalpine Club and which lasted for many years. Milner continued to write and speak in opposition to them.

== Appointment as vicar apostolic and first controversies ==
The clergy who were supporters of the Cisalpine spirit were chiefly in the Midland District, one group who had acted together being known as the Staffordshire Clergy. It was this very district over which Milner was called to rule in 1803, when he was consecrated titular Bishop of Castabala, and appointed Vicar Apostolic of the Midland District. His coat of arms was blazoned "Argent a chevron Gules between in chief an Alpha Chi-Rho Omega and in base a fish naiant Sable".

The resulting state of tension between clergy was of short duration. Milner, however, was not satisfied with his position in the Midlands. He had formed an alliance with the Irish bishops, and with their co-operation, a determined attempt was made to have him transferred to London as coadjutor with right of succession. This scheme was opposed by Bishop John Douglass, and ultimately defeated, though the pope consented that Milner should become parliamentary agent to the Irish bishops in their struggle to procure Catholic emancipation, and that for this purpose he should be permitted to go to London as often as necessary. This disagreement with his colleagues led to further results. Milner found fault with the manner in which the London District was governed, and was not afraid to say so publicly, in numerous pamphlets and other publications, and even in his pastorals. The subjects of contention were several; but two especially may be mentioned. One was the " question of the Royal veto of the appointment of bishops, which first came into prominence in the year 1808. By this it was intended to concede to the Crown a negative voice in the election of Catholic bishops, by conferring a right to veto any candidate whose loyalty was open to question. The chief Irish bishops had agreed to the measure in 1799; but since then, owing to the postponement of emancipation, the scheme had dropped. Milner revived it, and was for a time the warm advocate of the veto. He found himself in opposition to most of the Irish bishops.

He visited Ireland, and afterwards wrote his Letter to a Parish Priest (who was really an Irish bishop) in defence of his position. The Irish bishops, however, condemned the Veto in 1808. A year later Milner was converted to their way of thinking, and became as vigorous in opposition to it as he had been before in its favour.

About this time the English Catholics, in presenting a petition to Parliament, embodied what was known as their "Fifth Resolution", offering a "grateful concurrence" to a Bill which would give them emancipation, accompanied by any "arrangements" for the safe-guarding of the Established Church which should not be inconsistent with their religion. Milner declared – contrary to the assertions of the framers of the Resolution – that the "arrangements" intended, included the Veto, and he denounced those who signed the petition, including all the other vicars apostolic of England. In this he received the support of the Irish bishops. Another source of criticism was the want of vigour which he alleged against the Vicar of the London District in combatting the Blanchardist schism among the French emigrant clergy, especially the restoration of one of them, Abbé de Trevaux, to spiritual faculties without a public retraction. In this matter also he was supported by the Irish bishops.

== Quarantotti Rescript ==
A crisis occurred in 1813, William Poynter being then Vicar Apostolic of the London District. A Bill for the full emancipation of Catholics was introduced into the House of Commons by Henry Grattan; but Lord Castlereagh and George Canning introduced amending clauses giving the Crown a veto on the appointment of bishops, to be exercised only on the recommendation of a committee consisting chiefly of Catholic Peers. Milner and the Irish bishops maintained that no Catholic could assent to this without incurring schism. The other vicars apostolic did not go so far as this, though they opposed the clauses. The leading members of the Catholic Board, consisting chiefly of laymen, were in favour of accepting them as the necessary price to pay for emancipation. Milner, however, used all his influence to procure the rejection of the Bill. He printed a Brief Memorial in this sense, and distributed it among members of Parliament. The Bill passed its second reading, but in committee the clause admitting Catholics to Parliament was defeated by a small majority of four votes, and the Bill was abandoned. Milner took to himself the credit of having been the cause of its defeat, and the laymen were so angry with him that, to their permanent disgrace, they publicly expelled him from the committee of the Catholic Board. In the meantime Dr. Poynter appealed to Rome for guidance in the expected event of the re-introduction of the Bill. The pope was at that time a prisoner of Bonaparte, and the Cardinals were dispersed. In their absence Cardinal Giovanni Battista Quarantotti, Secretary of Propaganda Fide, using the powers with which he had been provisionally invested, issued a Rescript, dated February 1814, approving of the Bill as it stood. Milner did not fail to see the serious results which would follow from this and decided immediately to appeal to the pope, who having been liberated from captivity, was on his way back to Rome. His journey was so far successful that the Quarantotti Rescript was recalled, and the pope ordered the whole matter to be examined afresh. In the end a decision was promulgated in the shape of a letter from Cardinal Litta, Prefect of Propaganda, to Dr. Poynter, who had also come to Rome. The provisions of the late Bill were condemned; but on the general question of the veto, apart from the Lay Committees, the decision was against Milner; subject to certain safeguards, Catholics were empowered to concede a veto to the Crown, provided this negative power was so limited as not to be allowed to grow into a positive nomination. This led to further agitation in Ireland, and another deputation was sent to Rome; but the English Catholics, including Milner himself, accepted the decision without question. The English vicars apostolic were, however, naturally opposed to the veto, and in the event it never became necessary to use the permission granted.

== Last years ==
On his return from Rome, Milner continued to write controversially, the new Orthodox Journal being a frequent medium for his communications. His language was as harsh as ever, and unbecoming in a bishop, until at length an appeal was made to Rome, and Cardinal Fontana, who was then Prefect of Propaganda, forbade him to write in it any more. During the last years of his life Milner withdrew to a great extent from public politics. He ceased to act on behalf of the Irish bishops, and though he did not hold any intercourse with the other vicars Apostolic, he ceased to write against them. He devoted himself to literary work. In 1818 his End of Controversy, perhaps the best known of all his books, at length appeared, and it was followed by a war of pamphlets and replies which went on for several years. Feeling his health failing, he applied for a coadjutor, and Thomas Walsh, President of Oscott College, was appointed. He was consecrated in 1825 when all the bishops of England met, and a reconciliation was effected. Milner survived less than a year, his death taking place at his house at Wolverhampton on 19 April 1826.

== Works ==
His History of Winchester appeared in 1798. It led to a controversy with a Dr Sturges, a prebendary of the cathedral, which brought forth two of Milner's best-known works, Letters to a Prebendary and The End of Religious Controversy. In deference to the wishes of his bishop, however, the last-named work was withheld for the sake of peace, and it did not see the light until nearly 20 years later.

His controversial writings were numerous and powerful, but they had the defect of unceasing asperity of language, so that he continued to embitter the strife.

His chief works are:

- "Funeral Discourse on Bishop Challoner" (1781);
- "The Clergyman's Answer to the Layman's Letter" (1790);
- "Pastoral of the Bishop of Leon" (translated 1791);
- "Discourse at Consecration of Bishop Gibson" (1791);
- "Divine Rights of Episcopacy" (1791);
- "Audi Alteram Partem" (1792);
- "Ecclesiastical Democracy detected" (1793);
- "Reply to Cisalpine Club" (1795);
- "Serious Expostulation with Rev. Joseph Berington" (1797);
- "History of Winchester" (1798);
- "Brief Life of Challoner" (1798);
- "Letters to a Prebendary" (1800);
- "Case of Conscience solved" (1801);
- "Elucidation of the Conduct of Pius VII" (1802);
- "Arguments against Catholic Petition " (1805);
- "Cure of Winefride White" (1805);
- "Letter to a Parish Priest" (1808);
- "Letters from Ireland" (1808);
- "Pastoral Letter on Blanchardists", "Sequel", "Supplement", and "Appendix" (1808–09);
- "Appeal to the Catholics of Ireland" (1809);
- "Discourse at Funeral of Sir William Jerningham " (1809);
- "Treatise on the Ecclesiastical Architecture of England" (1811);
- "Instructions for Catholics of Midland Counties" (1811);
- "Letter to Prelate of Ireland" (1811);
- "Explanation with Bishop Poynter" (1812);
- "Pastoral on Jurisdiction of Church", I, II, and III (1812–13);
- "Brief Memorial on Catholic Bill" (1813);
- "Multum in Parvo" (1813);
- "Encyclical Letter" (1813);
- "Inquisition. A letter to Sir John Cox Hippisley" (1816);
- "Humble Remonstrance to House of Commons" (1816);
- "Memoir of Bishop Hornyold" (Directory, 1818);
- "End of Religious Controversy" (1818);
- "Supplementary Memoirs of English Catholics" (1820, and "Additional Notes to" in 1821);
- "Devotion to the Sacred Heart" (1821);
- "Vindication of the End of Controversy" (1822);
- "Exposer exposed" (1824);
- "Parting Word to Dr. Grier" (1825).

For a complete list, see Husenbeth, infra, 572.

== Portraits ==
There are many portraits of Milner:

1. sketch, age about 25
2. miniature, as a bishop about 1803
3. miniature by Kernan (1808 — considered the best likeness)
4. painting by Barber, drawing master at Oscott, 1817
5. painting by Herbert, R.A. — said to be the most like, but it is in Gothic vestments and mitre, having been painted long after Milner's death
6. Painting of Milner as a priest, age about 45, at the convent, East Bergholt
7. Painting at the presbytery, Norwich, very similar to (5)
8. Engraving in "Laity's Directory", 1827, from a painting by Radcliffe (Orth. Jour., I, 173)
9. Bust, by Clark, sen. of Birmingham: many copies to be met with.

(1), (2), and (6) reproduced in the "Dawn of the Catholic Revival"; (8) in Harting's "Catholic London Mission"; (4) in "Catholic London a Century ago"; (5) in the penny "Life of Milner," by E. Burton (Catholic Truth Society).

== See also ==
- Bishop Milner Catholic School

== Sources ==
- Amherst, William Joseph, History of Catholic Emancipation (London, 1886)
- Brady, W. Maziere (1876). The Episcopal Succession in England, Scotland and Ireland, A.D. 1400 to 1875. Vol. 3. Rome: Tipografia Della Pace. pp. 221–241.
- Butler, Alban, Historical Memoirs of English Catholics (1819)
- Flanagan, Thomas, History of the Church in England (London, 1857)
- Husenbeth, Frederick Charles, The Life of the Right Rev. John Milner, D.D., James Duffy (Dublin, 1862)
- Kirk, John, Biographies of English Catholics (London, 1909)
- Laity's Directory (1827)
- MacCaffrey, James, History of the Catholic Church in the Nineteenth Century (Dublin, 1909)
- John Milner, Supplementary Memoirs of English Catholics (1820)
- Patten, Bridget, "Catholicism and the Gothic Revival: John Milner and St Peter's Chapel, Winchester", coll=Hampshire Papers, 21, Hampshire County Council (2001)
- Ward, Bernard Nicolas, Catholic London a Century Ago (London, 1905)

— Dawn of the Catholic Revival (London, 1909)

- Various articles in the Orthodox Journal, Gentleman's Magazine, Catholic Miscellany, Catholicon, Oscotian, etc.

Catholic Church titles
Preceded by Gregory Stapleton	Vicar Apostolic of the Midland District; 1803–1826	Succeeded by Thomas Walsh
