= Cisalpine Club =

The Cisalpine Club was an association of Roman Catholic laymen formed in England in the 1790s to promote Cisalpinism, and played a role in the public debate surrounding the progress of Catholic Emancipation.

== Overview ==
The principles of Cisalpinism represented a reaction against the attitude hitherto traditional among Roman Catholics, which seems to have begun about the time of the death of James Francis Edward Stuart, the "Old Pretender", in January 1766. Up to then they had been staunch Jacobites, and had looked to the restoration of the Stuarts as the only chance for a revival of their faith. About this time, however, by what Joseph Berington called "one of those singular revolutions for which no cause can be assigned", they gave up their former political aspirations, and accepted the reigning House of Hanover.

One likely cause was that from January 1766 the Papacy did not recognise James's heir Charles as a sovereign, which disconnected Catholicism from the Jacobite movement. Part of this reaction was a suspicion of the wisdom of their ecclesiastical rulers, who, they became convinced, had adopted in the past a needlessly strict attitude, opposed to English national aspirations and which (they contended) had been dictated by the Court of Rome. Bishop John Talbot Stonor, Vicar Apostolic of the Midland District, did much to persuade Catholics to accept the Hanoverian monarchy.

== Catholic Committee ==
They reverted to the Oath of Allegiance of the reign of King James I, which they declared themselves willing to take, while some even maintained that the Oath of Supremacy could be interpreted in a sense not inconsistent with the Roman Catholic faith. These were the principles which animated the Catholic Committee (1782–92) in its struggle for Catholic emancipation. The two chief leaders were Lord Petre and Sir John Throckmorton, both members of old recusant families, who had suffered much in times past under the Penal Laws. They had the active assistance of Charles Butler, a lawyer, who acted as secretary to the committee. The greater number (though by no means all) of the Catholic aristocracy, who in those days were the practical supporters of religion, sympathized with them and, in a modified degree, some of the clergy, especially in London. One bishop, Charles Berington, was on their side, and Father Joseph Wilkes, O.S.B., who was a member of the committee, went to great lengths in supporting them. Dr James Talbot, Vicar Apostolic of the London District from 1781 to 1790, also allowed his name to be added and showed a weakness in opposing them which he regretted on his death-bed, and which made the task of his successor, Dr Douglass (1790–1812), a difficult one.

Towards the end of the year 1788, Lord Stanhope, an Anglican, desiring to help the committee, and believing that their supposed Ultramontane principles, and in particular their accredited belief in the deposing power of the pope, were the chief obstacles in their way, drew out a "Protestation" disclaiming these in unmeasured language. The committee adopted the Protestation and early in the following year called upon all Catholics to sign it. Butler admits that it was only with some difficulty that the bishops were induced to sign; but they did. Two of the bishops afterwards revoked their signatures and Milner, who was one of those who had signed, took an active part in opposing the committee.

== Relief ==
The result of their labours was the Roman Catholic Relief Act 1791. In the first draft there had been an "Oath of Declaration, Protestation and Allegiance", based on the Protestation of 1789, but going to even greater lengths. This oath was definitely condemned by the bishops, led by Charles Walmesley, in 1789 and 1791. After a sharp conflict it was removed from the bill during its passage through Parliament, and the Irish Oath of 1774 substituted. As the act in its final state failed to embody the principles of the Protestation, a new society was formed to perpetuate these, under the title of The Cisalpine Club. Others besides the members of the Catholic Committee were invited to join the club. The declared object of the club was "...to resist any ecclesiastical interference, which may militate against the freedom of English Catholics." Dissatisfied with the club's failure to come to an amicable relationship with the apostolic vicars, a few prominent members split off to form the Roman Catholic Club.

The membership usually numbered between forty and fifty. They met four or five times a year, during the London season, each meeting being preceded by a dinner. At a meeting in the latter part of 1795, no business was entered in the minutes other than to authorize the secretary to lay in a hogshead of claret.

At first they took an active part in Catholic affairs, though consistently disclaiming any representative character. In several ways they succeeded in guarding Catholic interests, and by their influence a school was established at Oscott, directed by a governing body of laymen though the headmaster was a priest, appointed by the bishop. After a few years, however, the Cisalpine Club ceased to perform any active work, and developed into a mere dining club. As the membership increased, it seems their Cisalpine principles diminished. It soon ceased to act at all as a body having any influence in Catholic affairs.

At the beginning the bishops had naturally viewed it askance, although its members were often the chief supporters of Catholic charities. A meeting held in March 1796 took up a collection for destitute French emigres in London. A motion was passed in May 1801: "It was ordered that whenever the usual day of meeting of the club shall be a fast day, the secretary shall appoint the following Tuesday for the meeting of the club." As there was no provision in the club's rules to expel a member, in 1808, in order to exclude a particular individual the members all agreed to withdraw their names from membership and reconvene later as a newly constituted group. However, the person they would oust laid claim, as the sole member left of the soon to be defunct organization, to the club's assets, which consisted of whatever wine still remained in the cellar.

As time went on, their Cisalpine tendencies became less and less marked, and they got on good terms with Bishop William Poynter (1803–1826), who only regretted the name of the club. Daniel O'Connell had been proposed for membership, but at the May 1829 meeting was blackballed, because of an apparent slight to the English Catholic Association. Soon after the passing of the Roman Catholic Relief Act 1829 the members re-formed themselves into a new club in 1830, which they called the "Emancipation Club", and which continued for seventeen more years before finally dissolving.

== See also ==
- Thomas Weld (of Lulworth)
- John Milner
