= Sedgley Park (disambiguation) =

Sedgley Park is a suburban area of Prestwich in Greater Manchester, England. It may also refer to:

- Sedgley Park R.U.F.C., a rugby union club based at Whitefield near Prestwich.
- Sedgley Park Primary School, Prestwich, a primary school in Prestwich.
- Sedgley Park School, Wolverhampton, a former Roman Catholic school.
