= Thomas Walsh (vicar apostolic) =

English Roman Catholic bishop and vicar apostolic

The Right Reverend Thomas Walsh
- Vicar Apostolic of the London District
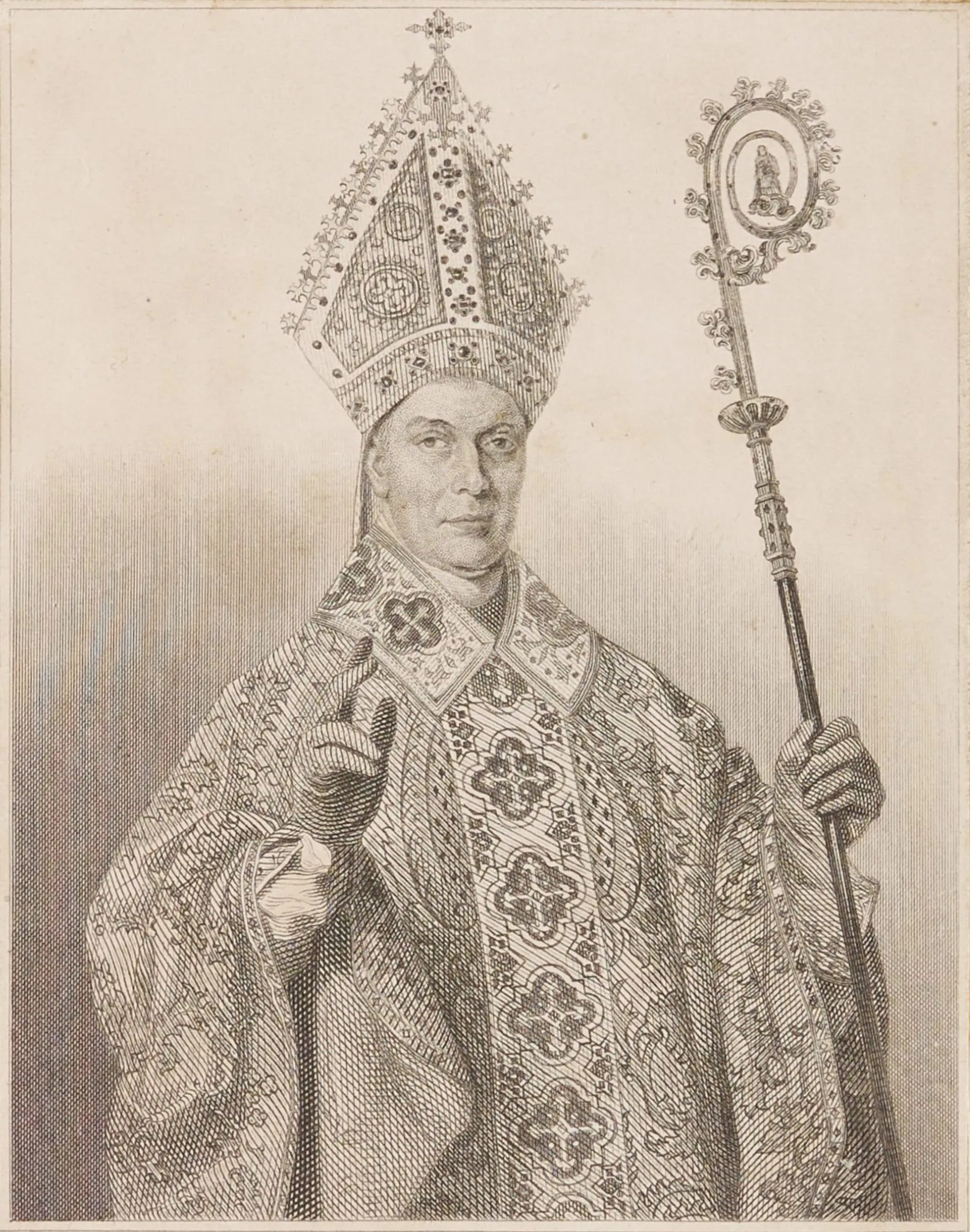
- Appointed: 17 July 1848
- Term ended: 18 February 1849
- Predecessor: Thomas Griffiths
- Successor: Nicholas Wiseman (As the Archbishop of Westminster)
- Other post: Titular Bishop of Cambysopolis
- Previous posts: Coadjutor Vicar Apostolic of Midland District (1825-1826); Vicar Apostolic of Midland District (1826-1840); Vicar Apostolic of the Central District (1840-1848)

Orders
- Ordination: 19 September 1801
- Consecration: 1 May 1825 by John Milner

Personal details
- Born: 3 October 1777 London, England
- Died: 18 February 1849 (aged 71)
- Denomination: Roman Catholic

Thomas Walsh (3 October 1777 –18 February 1849) was an English Catholic prelate who served as Vicar Apostolic of the London District from 1848 until his death.

== Life ==
Thomas Walsh was born in London on 3 October 1777, the son of Charles and Mary Brittle Walsh. He attended St Albans Grammar School in Hertfordshire. Through his uncle, a priest of the London District, he obtained admission to the College of St. Omer. In 1793, the French Revolution and the United Kingdom's declaration of war on France ended the Saint Omer college. The English faculty and students were imprisoned at Dourlens. In 1795, Gregory Stapleton, President of the college, obtained from the directory an order for the release of the sixty-four students. They were conveyed to England in an American vessel, and landed at Dover on 2 March 1795. Walsh continued his studies at Old Hall Green.

Stapleton was appointed vicar apostolic of the Midland district on 29 May 1800, and took up residence at Longbirch, near Wolverhampton. He brought Walsh, then a deacon, to serve as secretary. Walsh was ordained priest on 19 September 1801, and continued under Stapleton's successor, Bishop John Milner, as chaplain and missioner at Longbirch until October, 1804, when he was sent to Sedgley Park School as chaplain. In 1808 he went to St Mary's College, Oscott as vice-president and later he served as president from 1818 to 1826.

At the age of 46, he was made Coadjutor Vicar Apostolic of the Midland District (of England) by Pope Leo XII, with the title of bishop of Cambysopylis, assisting Bishop John Milner. He succeeded to the Vicariate on the death of Bishop Milner in 1826. Walsh is most remembered for his commissioning of two cathedrals, the Cathedral of Saint Chad, Birmingham and Nottingham Cathedral, and his association with the distinguished architect Augustus Welby Pugin. The Midland District was renamed the Central District on 3 July 1840, but lost jurisdiction of the counties of Cambridgeshire (with the Isle of Ely), Huntingdonshire, Lincolnshire, Norfolk, Northamptonshire, and Rutland to the newly formed the Apostolic Vicariate of the Eastern District.

In 1848, he was named, despite his reluctance, Vicar Apostolic of the London District, with the intention of him being the first Archbishop of Westminster when the hierarchy was to be restored in 1850 but he was too old and infirm at 71 to take any active part in its affairs, and so left its administration in the hands of his coadjutor, Bishop Nicholas Wiseman.

Walsh died in Golden Square, Soho, London on 18 February 1849. He is buried in the crypt chapel of St Peter, in the Metropolitan Cathedral of St Chad. A large Gothic-revival memorial to him with a recumbent effigy, designed by Pugin and carved by George Myers, was erected in the North aisle of the Cathedral in 1851, after being exhibited in the Mediaeval Court of the Great Exhibition in The Crystal Palace, Hyde Park, London.

Bishop Walsh Catholic School in Sutton Coldfield, Birmingham is named after him.

Catholic Church titles
Preceded by John Milner	Vicar Apostolic of the Midland District; 1826–1840	District divided
New title	Vicar Apostolic of the Central District; 1840–1848	Succeeded by William Bernard Ullathorne
Preceded by Thomas Griffiths	Vicar Apostolic of the London District; 1848–1849	Succeeded by Nicholas Wiseman
