= Gregory Stapleton =

English Roman Catholic bishop

- Vicar Apostolic of Midland District
- Church: Catholic Church
- See: Apostolic Vicariate of the Midland District
- In office: 7 November 1800 – 23 May 1802
- Predecessor: Charles Berington
- Successor: John Milner
- Other post: Titular Bishop of Hierocaesarea (1800-1802)

Orders
- Ordination: 1772
- Consecration: 8 March 1801 by John Douglass

Personal details
- Born: 1748 Carlton, Yorkshire, Kingdom of Great Britain
- Died: 23 May 1802 (aged 53–54) Saint-Omer, Pas-de-Calais, French Republic

Gregory Stapleton D.D. (1748–23 May 1802) was an English Roman Catholic bishop. While president of St. Omer's English College, he and his students were imprisoned during the French Revolution.

== Life ==
Born at Carlton, Yorkshire, he was seventh son of Nicholas Stapleton, by his third wife, Winifred, daughter of John White of Dover Street, London. He went to the English College, Douai, in 1762. Ten years later, then a deacon, he was appointed professor of music. On his ordination, a year later, he became procurator of the college, and he retained that post for more than twelve years.

In 1787, he was appointed president of the English College at St. Omer, in succession to Alban Butler. About three years after the outbreak of the French Revolution he and the students of the English colleges at St. Omer and Douai were imprisoned in the citadel of Doullens. In 1795 he obtained leave to go to Paris, and after difficulties he procured from the directory an order for the release of all the students, sixty-four in number. They were conveyed to England in an American vessel, and landed at Dover on 2 March 1795.

Soon afterwards Stapleton, with Bishop John Douglass, went to the Duke of Portland and William Pitt, to solicit their approval of a plan for converting the school at Old Hall Green, near Ware, Hertfordshire, into a Catholic college. The duke had previously known Stapleton, and he and Pitt gave them encouragement. Stapleton took his students to Old Hall Green, and on 19 August 1795 the first stone was laid of St. Edmund's College, Ware. Stapleton presided over it till the autumn of 1800, when, having accompanied the Rev. John Nassau to Rome on a secret mission, he was raised to the episcopate.

Stapleton's appointment to be titular bishop of Hierocæsarea and vicar apostolic of the Midland district, in succession to Charles Berington, was approved by the pope on 29 May 1800, and he was consecrated on 8 March 1801. He took up his residence at Longbirch near Wolverhampton, and employed one of his former students, Thomas Walsh, as secretary. (Walsh would later become Vicar Apostolic of the London District.)

Stapleton died at St. Omer on 23 May 1802, and was succeeded as vicar apostolic by John Milner.

Catholic Church titles
Preceded by Charles Berington	Vicar Apostolic of the Midland District; 1800–1802	Succeeded by John Milner
