= William Poynter =

English Catholic bishop

The Right Reverend William Poynter
- Vicar Apostolic of the London District
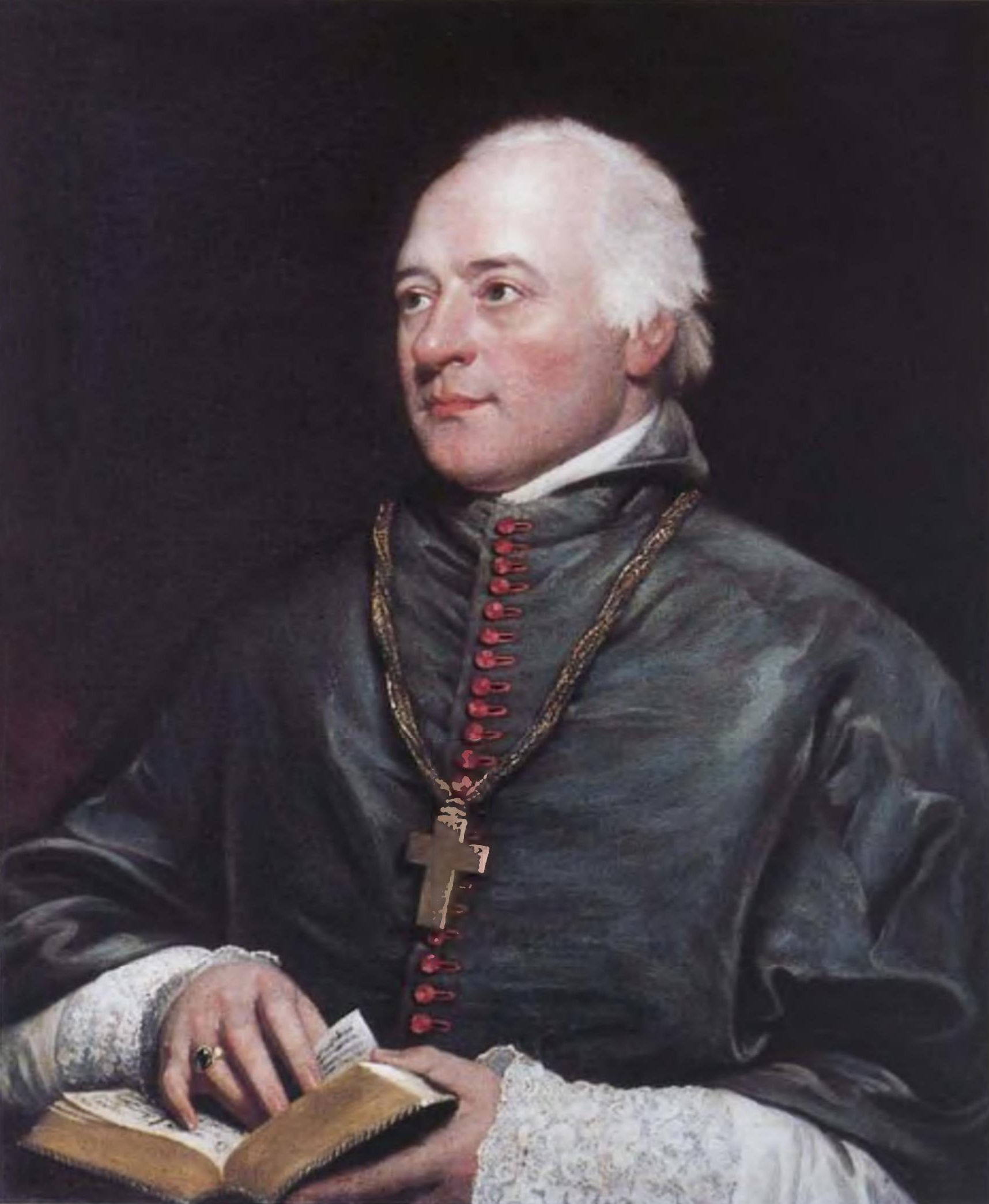
- Portrait (1803) by Ramsey, in St Edmund's College, Ware
- Appointed: 6 March 1803 (Coadjutor)
- Installed: 8 May 1812
- Term ended: 26 November 1827
- Predecessor: John Douglass
- Successor: James Yorke Bramston
- Other post: Titular Bishop of Alia

Orders
- Ordination: 1786
- Consecration: 29 May 1803 by John Douglass

Personal details
- Born: 20 May 1762 Petersfield, Hampshire, England
- Died: 26 November 1827 (aged 65) London, United Kingdom
- Denomination: Roman Catholic

William Poynter (20 May 1762 – 26 November 1827) was an English Catholic priest who served as Vicar Apostolic of London.

== Life ==
=== Early life ===
Poynter was educated at the English College at Douai, where he was ordained in 1786. He remained as professor, and afterwards prefect of studies till the college was suppressed during the French Revolution.

After undergoing eighteen months imprisonment, the collegians were set free, and returned to England in March, 1795. Poynter with the students from the South of England went to Old Hall at Ware, Hertfordshire, where he took a leading part in the foundation of St. Edmund's College, being first vice-president, then (1801–13) president.

=== Apostolic vicar ===
In 1803, in light of the declining health of Bishop John Douglass, vicar apostolic of the London district, Poynter was appointed titular bishop of Halia and coadjutor vicar apostolic, remaining at the same time president of the college. He was consecrated bishop by Bishop Douglass on 29 May 1803. On the death of Bishop Douglass in 1812, Bishop Poynter succeeded as vicar apostolic.

His position was rendered difficult by the persistent attacks of Bishop John Milner, vicar apostolic of the Midlands District, in pamphlets and in his pastorals, covering a range of disputes but mostly centred on the question of Catholic Emancipation and the demands of the British government to control the appointment of Catholic bishops in Great Britain. An unrelated dispute arose when Poynter put restrictions on the writings of Peter Gandolphy which Milner then allowed in his vicariate. Poynter endured Milner's accusations in silence, having the support of all the other English and Scotch bishops; but when in May 1814, on the issue of the Quarantotti Rescript, Milner went to Rome to obtain its reversal, Poynter followed him there and wrote his Apologetical Epistle defending himself to the Sacred Congregation of Propaganda Fide.

Quarantotti's Rescript was withdrawn, and in its place was substituted a Letter to Dr. Poynter, dated from Genoa, where the pope had taken refuge during the Hundred Days that ensued upon Napoleon Bonaparte's escape from exile on Elba. A limited veto for the British Crown upon the appointment of bishops was sanctioned, but the exequatur was refused. Milner was directed to abstain from publishing pastorals or pamphlets against Poynter. He obeyed this injunction, but continued his attacks in letters to the Orthodox Journal until he was peremptorily prohibited by order of the pope, under pain of being deposed.

During his episcopate Poynter paid four visits to Paris of several months each (1814, 15, 17, and 22), with the object of reclaiming the property of the colleges at Douai and elsewhere, which had been confiscated during the Revolution. He received the support of the Duke of Wellington and Lord Castlereagh, and of the British commissioners appointed to deal with the claims.

He succeeded eventually in recovering the colleges themselves and about £30,000 which had been kept in the names of the bishops, but the main claim amounting to £120,000 was lost. The French paid it to the British commissioners, but these refused to hand it over, on the plea that it would be applied to purposes considered by English law as "superstitious". The final decision was given in November, 1825.

== Works ==
His principal works are:

- Theological Examinations of Columbanus (London, 1811);
- Epistola Apologetica, tr. by Butler (London, 1820), also appeared in Butler, "Hist. Mem.", 3rd edition;
- Prayerbook for Catholic Sailors and Soldiers (London, 1858);
- Evidences of Christianity (London, 1827);
- New Year's Gift in Directories (1813–28); numerous pamphlets, pastorals etc.

== Portraits ==
A portrait of Bishop Poynter by Ramsay (1803) hangs at St Edmund's College, Ware; another in the Catholic Directory for 1829; also a bust by Turnerelli, and another at Moorfields.

== Sources ==
- Thompson Cooper in the Dictionary of National Biography
- Joseph Gillow, Dict. Eng. Cath.;
- John Kirk, Biographies (London, 1909):
- Brady, Episcopal Succession (London, 1877)
- Amherst, Cath. Emancipation (London, 1886);
- Bernard Nicholas Ward, History of St. Edmund's College (London, 1893);
- ____, Catholic London a Century Ago (London, 1905);
- ____, Dawn of Catholic Revival (London, 1909);
- Husenbeth, Life of Milner (Dublin, 1862);
- Butler, Hist. Mem. (3rd ed., London, 1822);
- Laity's Directory (1829);
- Catholic Miscellany;
- Orthodox Journal.

Attribution

Catholic Church titles
Preceded by John Douglass	Vicar Apostolic of the London District; 1812–1827	Succeeded by James Yorke Bramston
