= John Bede Polding =

Australian archbishop (1794–1877)

The Most Reverend John Bede Polding
- Archbishop of Sydney
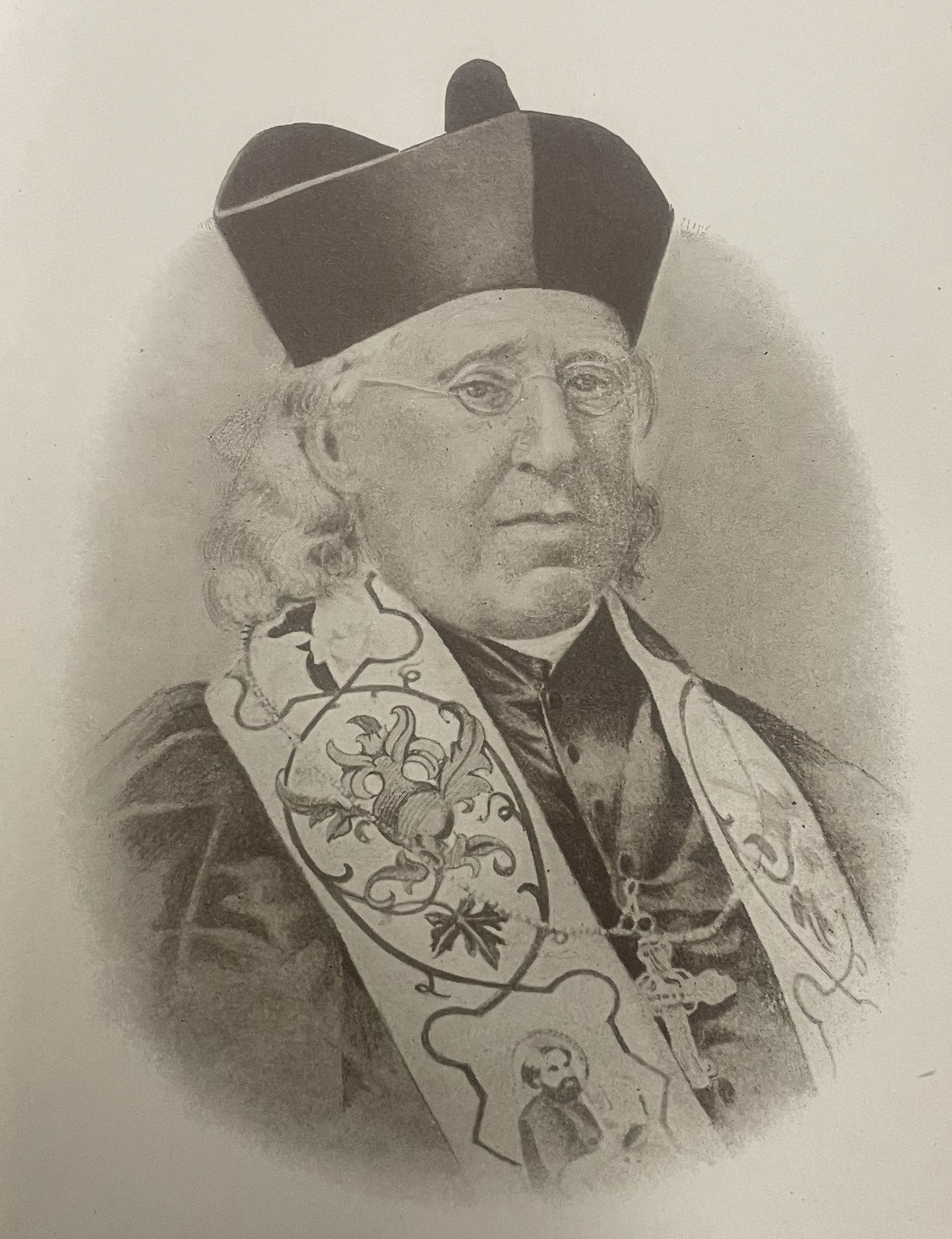
- John Bede Polding

Personal details
- Born: 18 November 1794
- Died: 16 March 1877 (aged 82)
- Buried: St Mary's Cathedral

Ordination history
History
Priestly ordination
- Date: 4 March 1819
Episcopal consecration
- Date: 29 June 1834
Cardinalate
- Date: 22 April 1842

John Bede Polding OSB (18 November 1794 – 16 March 1877) was an English Benedictine monk and the first Roman Catholic Archbishop of Sydney, Australia.

== Early life ==
Polding was born in Liverpool, England, on 18 November 1794. His father was of Dutch descent and his mother came from the Brewer family of recusants since the sixteenth century. His family name was also spelled "Poulden" or "Polten". His parents died and at age 8 he was placed in the care of his uncle, Father Bede Brewer, president-general of the English Benedictine Congregation.

Polding was first taught by the Benedictine nuns of the Convent of Our Lady of Consolation of Cambray, who as refugees from revolutionary France were located at Much Woolton, near Liverpool. At 11, he was sent to St Gregory's Benedictine College at Acton Burnell near Shrewsbury, Shropshire. On 15 July 1810, Polding was admitted to the religious community, taking the name "Bede" in honour both of the saint and his uncle. He received minor orders in 1813 from Bishop John Milner in Wolverhampton and was ordained priest by Bishop William Poynter at Old Hall College on 4 March 1819. In turn he held the offices of parish priest, prefect, novice-master and sub-prior in his monastery. In 1819 Polding's cousin, Bishop Edward Bede Slater, was appointed vicar apostolic with jurisdiction over Mauritius, Madagascar, the Cape, New Holland and Van Diemen's Land.

From 1826 to 1834 he was secretary to the president-general of the Benedictine Congregation. In 1832, Pope Gregory XVI invited him to become Bishop of Hierocaesarea in partibus infidelium.

== Experiences in Australia ==
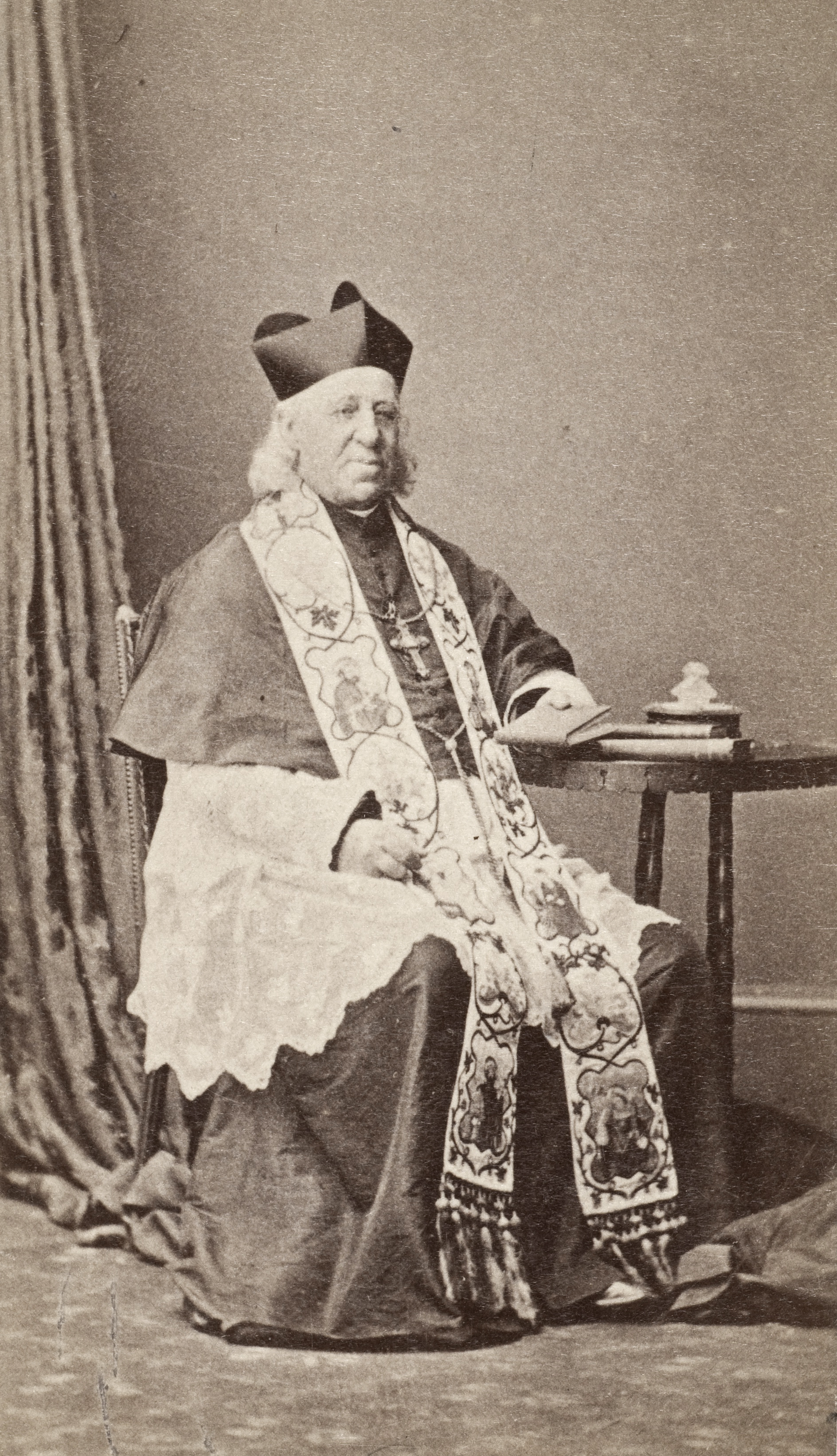
Rev. John Bede Polding, Archbishop of Sydney, c. 1875

In 1834 Polding was appointed Bishop of Hierocaesarea in partibus infidelium and Vicar Apostolic of New Holland, Van Diemen's Land and the adjoining islands. Polding and party arrived first in Hobart on 6 August 1835. Leaving a priest and a student there, he travelled on and arrived in Sydney on 13 September 1835. The authorities soon realised the good effect his influence was having, and arranged that, on the arrival of every ship-load of convicts, all the Catholics should be placed at his disposal for some days, during which the bishop and his assistants saw each prisoner personally and did all they could for them before they were drafted off to their various destinations. Polding travelled widely throughout Australia and was regarded as hard-working. He travelled to Europe in November 1840, appointing Francis Murphy to serve as vicar general of the diocese during his absence.

On 5 April 1842, Polding was appointed the first Bishop of Sydney and subsequently Archbishop on 22 April 1842. Some sources report that as a result of a successful diplomatic mission to Malta, Archbishop Polding was made a Count of the Holy Roman Empire. This cannot be true, since the Holy Roman Empire was dissolved de facto in 1806. It is possible, on the other hand, that he was made a papal Count. Reports are probably accurate which say that he was appointed an Assistant at the Pontifical Throne, an honorific title formerly granted by the Popes to some bishops.

Despite his many successes as a founding bishop, Polding experienced a degree of resistance from his largely Irish Catholic church in Australia. Even after the English Catholic Emancipation Act 1829, the Irish were resistant to non-Irish bishops. The British anti-clerical laws of the Reformation Parliament and the Act of Supremacy had bred deep resentment among the Irish against the English, and the consequences of the dissolution of monasteries during the English Reformation had left Polding deeply committed to the primary vision of restoring monasticism in English-speaking lands such as Australia.

In 1843 Polding established a mission for Aboriginal people at Moongalba on Stradbroke Island, staffed by Passionist priests. However, the attempt failed and the Passionists left the island not long afterwards.

He helped establish St John's College, University of Sydney and Mary's College, Lyndhurst. Polding travelled again to Rome in 1846 hoping to obtain a coadjutor bishop and Benedictine nuns to help in his diocese. He was successful in these quests and also gained approval for the establishment of Melbourne as a separate see. With his support, the Religious Sisters of Charity began the House of the Good Shepherd. In 1857 Polding established the Sisters of the Good Samaritan, an Australian congregation of Religious women.

In January 1874, he retired to Sacred Heart Presbytery, Darlinghurst.

Polding died on 16 March 1877 in Sydney, aged 82, and was initially buried at Petersham Cemetery. He was later reinterred in St Mary's Cathedral.

== Legacy ==
Apart from the many churches he founded, Polding began the construction of the second St Mary's Cathedral, Sydney in 1868, where he was later re-buried. Polding also founded the Sisters of the Good Samaritan in Sydney.

Bede Polding College, South Windsor, in the state of New South Wales, Australia is named after him.

== Sources ==
- Bede Nairn, 'Polding, John Bede (1794–1877)', Australian Dictionary of Biography, Volume 2, MUP, 1967, pp 340–347.
- Serle, Percival (1949). "Polding, John Bede". Dictionary of Australian Biography. Sydney: Angus & Robertson.

Catholic Church titles
Preceded by New title	1st Catholic Archbishop of Sydney; 1842–1877	Succeeded by Roger Bede Vaughan OSB
