= Catholic Committee =

Catholic Committee may refer to:

- Catholic Committee (Ireland)
- Cisalpine Club in England and its associated Catholic Committee
