= Royal veto of the appointment of bishops =

Proposed law of the United Kingdom

A royal veto of the appointment of bishops (also known as the Veto controversy in Irish history) was proposed in the United Kingdom of Great Britain and Ireland from 1808 to 1829 during the move towards Catholic Emancipation.

According to the proposal, any restoration of the full episcopal hierarchy of the Catholic Church, in United Kingdom, should be subject to a veto of the Crown over the appointment of any bishop who was suspected to the involved in political activities hostile to the state. This was in reference to the Catholic Church in England and Wales, the Catholic Church in Ireland and the Catholic Church in Scotland.

Although similar vetos, as a survival from the Medieval Investiture Controversy, existed elsewhere in countries (then in France, after the concordat of 1801, the government nominated directly all the Catholic bishops) and there was some acceptance among the clerical hierarchy, there was a strong backlash to the proposal from the growing Irish Catholic middle-class laity, who did not want anything resembling Caesaropapism, such as a State veto on Irish bishops (and thus preferred them to be directly approved from Rome). The matter was eventually resolved by the passage of Catholic Emancipation in 1829 without such a condition.

== Background ==
Although the penal laws enacted against the Catholics of Ireland and of Britain were still on the statute book towards the close of the eighteenth century, they were less strictly administered than before. Several causes helped to bring this about. The Catholics formed the vast majority of the population of Ireland. Their sympathies were thought to be with the French whom Britain had at that time cause to fear.

The authority of the bishops and the priests, the influence of both on the people, was great; and the government thought if it could direct or control the influence of the bishops it would secure the allegiance of the people. When the College of Maynooth was about to be founded, the Irish bishops were asked if they would agree that the president or professors of the proposed college be appointed by government; if they would consent that the bishops be appointed by the king; and how they would advise the pope if such a proposal about the appointment of bishops were laid before him.

The bishops on 17 February 1795, rejected the first and second proposals. To the third they answered that they would advise the people "not to agree to his Majesty's nomination if it could be avoided; if unavoidable, the king to nominate one of three to be recommended by the Provincial bishops".

In connection with the Union, William Pitt intended to bring in a Catholic Relief Bill. He commissioned Lord Castlereagh to make such arrangements as would satisfy the king George III of Great Britain that no priest whose loyalty the king should have reason to suspect would be appointed to an Irish bishopric. Ten bishops, trustees of Maynooth College, met on 17 January 1799, to transact college business. Castlereagh submitted his views to them, reminding them of the suspicion of disloyalty under which the Catholics of Ireland lay since the insurrection of the year before. The ten bishops embodied their reply in certain resolutions, of which this was one:

That in the appointment of the Prelates of the Roman Catholic Religion to vacant sees within the kingdom, such interference of government as may enable it to be satisfied of the loyalty of the person appointed, is just, and ought to be agreed to.

And as a way towards that security, they expressed the opinion that the name of the priest chosen to be submitted to the pope might be transmitted to the government, but that the government should declare within a month whether there was any cause to suspect his loyalty. They did not leave to the government to decide the reasonableness of such suspicion, for they said "if government have any proper objection against such candidate". Moreover, they laid it down that no security given must in the working out "infringe the discipline of the Roman Catholic Church, or diminish the religious influence which the Prelates of the Church ought justly to possess over their respective flocks", and that any agreement made "can have no effect without the sanction of the Holy See".

== Intervention from Rome ==
Those were not resolutions of the Irish episcopate, but simply the opinion of ten bishops who had met to transact business of another kind; they were driven against their wish to give an opinion. On 15 June 1799, Cardinal Stefano Borgia, prefect of Propaganda, having heard a report that John Troy, Archbishop of Dublin, was leader of a party which was disposed to compromise the jurisdiction of the Holy See by assenting to some plan about church discipline, wrote to him asking him for the facts. On 17 August 1799, Troy replied to the cardinal declaring it was quite false that any plan had been arranged, and having given an account of the meeting and resolutions of the Maynooth trustees he added: "As to the proposal itself, the Prelates were anxious to set aside or elude it; but being unable to do so, they determined to have the rights of the Church secured."

In the spring of 1800, Troy, writing on the same topic to his agent at Rome, R. Luke Concanen, says:

We all wish to remain as we are; and we would so, were it not that too many of the clergy were active in the wicked rebellion, or did not oppose it. If the Prelates had refused to consider the proposal, they would be accused of a design to exercise an influence over the people, independent of government, for seditious purposes. Nothing but the well grounded apprehension of such a charge, though groundless in itself, would have induced the Prelates to consider the proposal in any manner. . .If we had rejected the proposal in toto we would be considered as rebels. This is a fact. If we agreed to it without reference to Rome we would be branded as schismatics. We were between Scylla and Charybdis.

The opinion thus expressed by those ten bishops in January 1799, was never published by them. It was not meant for publication; the bishops never took official cognisance of it except to discard it. Every pronouncement of the Irish bishops from that time forward rejected absolutely any proposal which would allow the British government to meddle in appointments to Irish bishoprics.

== 1805 Bill onwards ==
In 1805 Charles James Fox and Lord Grenville presented to Parliament a petition to relieve the Irish Catholics from their civil disabilities. In the debate which followed, Sir John Hippisley spoke in a general way of securities for Catholic loyalty. That was the first time any such proposal was made in public; but nothing definite was proposed. On 25 May 1808, Henry Grattan, in moving for a parliamentary committee to consider the claims of the Catholics, said he was authorised by them to propose

that no Catholic bishop be appointed without the entire approbation of His Majesty.

On 27 May May, Lord Grenville presented a petition for the Catholics in the Lords, and, in moving for a committee, proposed an effective veto for the king on the appointment of bishops.

What was known as the "veto" thus assumed a definite form as a public question in Ireland and in England.

== Reaction ==
How did the Irish bishops meet it? John Milner wrote in his "Supplementary Memoirs of the English Catholics" that

both in conversation and in correspondence they universally disavowed

what had been said by the promoters of the bill on the subject of the veto; and on 14 September they met and officially protested against the veto.

In 1810 Grattan gave notice that he would again bring the Catholic claims before Parliament. On 1 February the English Catholic Board held a meeting in London at which a series of resolutions were carried, including one which involved the veto. It is known as the 5th resolution. Charles Butler, the leader of the English Catholic vetoists, says of that resolution that it

was with the single exception of the Vicar Apostolic of the Midland District, agent of the Irish bishops, unanimously adopted.

He was Dr. Milner, whom the Irish bishops had commissioned in 1807 to represent them. The Irish bishops at once condemned the 5th resolution. In May, Grattan's motion for a committee to consider the Catholic petition was defeated. Early in June Lord Donoughmore made a like motion in the House of Lords, which was also defeated. But here was the parting of the ways between the great body of the Irish Catholics led by the bishops, and the English Catholics, with whom were the vicars Apostolic except Milner.

== 1813 Bill ==
In 1813 Grattan, George Canning, and Castlereagh brought in what purported to be a Catholic Relief Bill, with a condition which would practically place the appointment of bishops in the hands of a board of commissioners to be named by the king; it also provided that anyone exercising special functions or receiving documents from the Holy See without the knowledge and approbation of that Board, was to be considered guilty of a misdemeanour. Those conditions notwithstanding, an amendment to the Bill was proposed and carried, which would still disable Catholics "to sit and vote in Parliament".

The Bill was lost; the Irish bishops had declared that they could not accept the Bill "without incurring the guilt of schism". A few days after, at a meeting of the Irish Catholic Board in Dublin, Daniel O'Connell proposed that their thanks be sent to the bishops. Some of the laity, who were in agreement with the English Catholics, opposed the vote; but it was carried by a very large majority.

== Quarantotti Rescript ==
The vetoists were disappointed at the defeat of the bill of 1813. It then occurred to them that if they could get the Holy See in any way to countenance it, the mark of schism attached to it by the Irish bishops would no longer stain it. They therefore represented to Propaganda the great benefit which the Catholic religion would derive from Emancipation, and the harmlessness of the veto conditions on which the Government had offered it. Milner was represented to the secretary of Propaganda, Giovanni Battista Quarantotti, as having an uncompromising attitude.

In the light of these representations, Quarantotti, in his rescript of February 1814, whilst rejecting certain conditions of the Relief Bill as not lawful, declared that securities for the loyalty of bishops which the Government claimed might be allowed. It did not contain an order, but rather a permission, its words being Haec cum ita sint, indulgemus etc, thus leaving the Catholics free to accept or refuse Emancipation on the condition offered.

It raised a storm, however, in Ireland. The Irish bishops deputed Murray and Milner to represent to the pope, who had been a prisoner when it was issued, that there was danger in the rescript such as it was. Pope Pius VII declared that Quarantotti "ought not to have written that letter without authority from the Holy See". He appointed a commission to examine the question.

== Counter-proposal ==
In the meantime, Murat marched on Rome, and the pope fled to Genoa. On 26 April 1815, Cardinal Litta, prefect of Propaganda, in a letter set forth conditions under which the Catholics could safely accept Emancipation. It rejected all arrangements hitherto proposed. The claim of the Government to examine communications between the Catholics and the Holy See "cannot even be taken into consideration". As to the appointment of bishops, it said that quite enough provision had been made for their loyalty in the Catholic oath; but for their greater satisfaction it permits "those to whom it appertains" to present to the king's ministers a list of the candidates they select for bishoprics; it insisted, however, that if those names were presented, the Government must, if it should think any of them "obnoxious or suspected" name him "at once"; moreover, that a sufficient number, from amongst whom the pope would appoint the bishop, must always remain even after the government objection.

The Catholics of Ireland sent deputies to Rome to make known their feelings to the pope. Two replies were sent, one to the bishops and the other to the laity. The pope insisted on the terms of Cardinal Litta's letter, pointing out its reasonableness under the circumstances. According to the terms of the letter it would, in fact, be the fault of the ecclesiastics who had the selection of candidates if any undesirable person were left for papal appointment. Cardinal Litta's letter was the last papal document issued on the veto question. The controversy between vetoists and anti-vetoists was, however, kept alive by the passions which it had raised.

== Resolution ==
The Catholic cause grew so hopeless that in December, 1821, O'Connell submitted to Dr. Blake, the Vicar-General of Dublin, a sort of veto plan, to get his opinion on it. Soon after the prospect grew brighter; O'Connell founded the Catholic Association in 1823, through which he successfully campaigned for Catholic Emancipation. The Bill was passed during the premiership of The Duke of Wellington six years later for the Catholics of Ireland and Britain — without a veto.

== See also ==
- Charles O'Conor (priest)
