= John Kirk (antiquarian) =

English Roman Catholic priest and antiquary

John Kirk D.D. (1760–1851) was an English Roman Catholic priest and antiquary.

== Life ==
He was son of William Kirk and his wife, Mary Fielding. He was born at Ruckley, near Acton Burnell, Shropshire, on 13 April 1760. At ten years of age he was sent to Sedgley Park School, Staffordshire. He was admitted into the English College, Rome on 5 June 1773, a few months before the suppression of the Society of Jesus by Pope Clement XIV. He was the last student received at the college by the Jesuits.

Kirk was ordained priest on 18 December 1784. Returning to England in August 1785, his first mission was at Aldenham Hall, Shropshire, in the family of Sir Richard Acton. In 1786, he became chaplain at Sedgley Park School, and as vice-president assisted the Rev Thomas Southworth, whom he succeeded as president in 1793. He had previously removed to the small mission at Pipe-hall, near Lichfield, and he had charge of the congregation at Tamworth.

In July 1797, he left Sedgley to become chaplain and private secretary to Charles Berington, Vicar Apostolic of the Midland District. Following the bishop's sudden death on 8 June 1798, Kirk stayed at the episcopal residence at Longbirch until the appointment of Dr Gregory Stapleton to the vicariate in 1801. He then moved to Lichfield, where a chapel built by him was opened on 11 November 1803; afterwards enlarged, it was converted in 1834 into the little Norman-style church of St Cross. He also erected chapels at Hopwas, near Tamworth, and in Tamworth itself. By diploma dated 9 November 1841, Pope Gregory XVI conferred on Kirk the degree of Doctor of Divinity (D.D.) He died at Lichfield 21 December 1851, aged 91.

There is a portrait of him, engraved by Deere, in the ‘Catholic Directory’ for 1853.

== Works ==
Kirk collected materials for a continuation of Charles Dodd's Church History of England: letters, tracts, annals, records, diaries, and papers. There were over fifty volumes, and account of all these materials, was published by him in a Letter to the Rev. Joseph Berington, respecting the Continuation of Dodd's Church History of England, Lichfield, September 1826. He handed over the work to Mark Aloysius Tierney of Arundel, who brought out a new edition of Dodd's History, 5 vols. London, 1839–43. This edition is incomplete, ending with the year 1625. On Tierney's death in 1862 the manuscript materials were bequeathed to Thomas Grant, the Archbishop of Southwark. Biographical collections by Kirk, mostly of a later date than Dodd, came into the possession of Henry Manning. In 1909 was published Biographies of English Catholics in the Eighteenth Century, edited from Kirk by John Hungerford Pollen and Edwin Hubert Burton.

About 1794 Kirk undertook the task of preparing for publication the State Papers and Letters of Sir Ralph Sadler, ambassador to Scotland in the time of Elizabeth I. These were published in 3 vols. 1809, by Arthur Clifford, with a biographical sketch by Sir Walter Scott. The original papers were then in the possession of the Cliffords of Tixall, Staffordshire; they went to the British Museum.

Kirk wrote, in collaboration with the Rev. Joseph Berington, The Faith of Catholics confirmed by Scripture and attested by the Fathers of the first five centuries of the Church, London, 1813 and 1830; 3rd edit. revised and greatly enlarged by the Rev. James Waterworth, 3 vols. London, 1846. There is a Latin translation in Joseph Braun's Bibliotheca Regularum Fidei, Bonn, 1844, vol. i. The work was attacked by the Rev. John Graham, in a review printed at the end of his Annals of Ireland, London, 1819; and the Rev. Richard Thomas Pembroke Pope published Roman Misquotation; or, Certain Passages from the Fathers adduced in Kirk's work brought to the test of their originals, London, 1840. Kirk published an edition of the 1680 Roman Catholic Principles in 1815. He argued from circumstantial evidence that the Principles were drawn up by the Benedictine father James Corker.

=== Books ===
- The Faith of Catholics on Certain Points of Controversy, Confirmed by Scripture and Attested by the Fathers of the First Five Centuries of the Church, New York: F. Pustet, 1885.
  - Volume I
  - Volume II
  - Volume III
