= Lionel Anderson =

English Dominican priest

Lionel Albert Anderson, alias Munson (died 1710) was an English Dominican priest, who was falsely accused of treason during the Popish Plot, which was the fabrication of the notorious anti-Catholic informer Titus Oates. He was convicted of treason on the technical ground that he had acted as a Catholic priest within England, contrary to an Elizabethan statute, but was reprieved from the customary death sentence. He was eventually released and sent into exile, after a biased trial, and after serving a term of imprisonment.

== Trial ==
Anderson had taken an oath of allegiance to King Charles II, and had accordingly been allowed to live quietly in England, with unofficial Government permission, since 1671; he was left in peace for a short time even after the outbreak of the Popish Plot. Eventually, however, the mounting anti-Catholic hysteria made prosecution of any known Catholic priest, even if he had sworn an oath of loyalty to the Crown, inevitable. He was arrested in 1679 and tried with six other priests for high treason under the Jesuits, etc. Act 1584, which banished from the realm all subjects of her Majesty born within her dominions who had received orders from the Papacy, on pain of death if they remained. This statute, which under Elizabeth I had been very vigorously administered, became after her death practically a dead letter, and so remained until the panic into which the nation was thrown by the fabrications of Oates and his fellow informer William Bedloe led to its resuscitation.

Anderson's trial was held at the Old Bailey on 17 January 1680 before Lord Chief Justice Sir William Scroggs, Lord Chief Baron William Montagu, justices Edward Atkyns, William Dolben, William Ellis, Thomas Jones, Francis Pemberton, the Recorder of London, Sir George Jeffreys and a jury. Six other priests stood trial with him. The prisoners (like all those accused of treason until 1695) were not allowed the benefit of legal counsel, and indeed the most skilful advocate would have been of little avail before judges who were determined to presume everything against rather than for the accused. Sir John Kelynge and Mr. Serjeant Stroke prosecuted. The principal prosecution witnesses were Oates, Bedloe, Thomas Dangerfield, and Miles Prance.

Dangerfield, who was a notorious thief and confidence trickster, and well known to be such by Scroggs and his fellow judges, thus proved Anderson to be a priest: ‘My lord, about the latter end of May of beginning of June, when I was a prisoner for debt in the King's Bench Prison, this person took occasion to speak privately to me, and desired me to go into his room. He told me that he had received a letter from my lady Powis, and that letter was burnt. But the next letter that came from my Lady Powis he would show it me. And he did so; and the contents of the letter was, as near as I can remember, just this: “Sir, you must desire Willoughby (i.e. Dangerfield) to scour his kettle,” which was to confess and receive the sacrament to be true to the cause.’

Anderson in return heaped on Dangerfield every insult he could think of, without interference from the Bench; the judges, despite their obvious anti-Catholic bias, regarded Dangerfield with contempt, and Scroggs would within a few months start to instruct juries to disregard his evidence, he being "so notorious a villain".

Anderson pleaded that in staying in the realm he was acting under an order from the Privy Council, and demanded that the three points necessary to bring him within the statute— (1) that he was born in England, (2) that he had received orders from the see of Rome, (3) that in remaining within the realm he was acting contrary to the statute—should be expressly proved. No evidence was forthcoming to prove any one of them, but the judges presumed them all against him, holding that the mere fact of his having celebrated the Catholic mass (which he admitted) was sufficient to make him guilty; and so they held of all the prisoners. In fairness to the judges, J.P. Kenyon points out that all seven of the accused were in fact priests, and some of them like Anderson himself, Maurus Corker and the colourful, one-legged Civil War veteran Colonel Henry Starkey, were well known to be such by the Government. To that extent, he argues, the trial was something of a formality.

== Verdict and reprieve ==
One of the accused, Alexander Lumsden by name, proving to be Scots by birth, was acquitted (after the initial hysteria engendered by the Plot began to diminish, the judges accepted that the Jesuits, etc. Act did not apply to Scots or Irish priests who happened to be in England). Another of the accused, David Kemish or Kemiss, who was a very old man and too frail to defend himself properly, was remanded in custody, so, Scroggs remarked, "that the world may not say we are grown barbarous and inhumane", and he died in prison ten days later. All the others were sentenced to be hanged, drawn, and quartered, but J.P. Kenyon, in his definitive account of the Popish Plot, concludes that they were all reprieved (Maurus Corker was certainly spared since he survived until 1715, while Colonel Starkey had been set at liberty by November 1680, although we hear of him in prison again in 1683).

Scroggs did promise to remind the King that Anderson had sworn an oath of allegiance to him. and evidently kept that promise. This may have been crucial in his obtaining a reprieve, although the Government does not seem to have been seeking blood on this occasion, to judge by the clemency shown to Kemiss, Corker and Starkey, as well as Anderson.

Anderson was banished from England with strict orders never to return: he had greatly embarrassed the Government by giving evidence that he had express permission from the Privy Council to remain in England. Since the Crown was aware that he intended to plead this in his defence, Kenyon remarks that it would surely have been wiser for the Government to spare themselves this embarrassment by simply leaving him in prison without a trial.

== Family ==
In an account of the trial published shortly after its occurrence Anderson is described as ‘an ancient man and seeming to be sick,’ and in the report of the trial itself there occurs a passage which suggests that he was suffering from physical weakness; but his bearing on that trying occasion indicates firmness and courage, and his manner of conducting his defence exhibits no trace of mental decay. Probably the report confused Anderson with his co-accused David Kemiss, who was so old and frail that the Court found him unfit to stand trial, and allowed him to die in prison a few days later.

In the course of the trial Oates having alleged that Anderson was an Oxfordshire man, he denied it, asserting that he was the son of a gentleman of quality in Lincolnshire, well known to the Lord Chief Baron Montagu, a statement which that judge did not hesitate to corroborate; and this is also borne out by his alias Munson, which is obviously identical with Mounson or Monson, the name of an ancient Lincolnshire family with which the Andersons of that county had often intermarried. Collier, in his ‘Historical Dictionary’ (2nd edition, 1688), notices one Lionel Anderson as lineally descended from the ancient family of the Andersons of Northumberland (afterwards settled in Lincolnshire), assigning Broughton as the chief seat of the family, and mentioning amongst others of their marriage connections the family of the Mounsons.

== Notes ==
Attribution

This article incorporates text from a publication now in the public domain: "Anderson, Lionel". Dictionary of National Biography. London: Smith, Elder & Co. 1885–1900.
