= St Edmund's College, Ware =

Coordinates: 51°52′49″N 0°00′31″W

St Edmund's College

Location
- Old Hall Green; Ware, Hertfordshire, SG11 1DS; England

Information
- Type: Private day and boarding school
- Motto: Avita pro fide (Latin: For the faith of our fathers)
- Religious affiliation: Roman Catholic
- Established: 1568; 458 years ago
- President: Vincent Nichols, Archbishop of Westminster
- Chair of the Board of Governors: Reverend Paul J E Raynes
- Headmaster: Matthew Mostyn
- Gender: Coeducational
- Age: 3 to 18
- Former pupils: Old Edmundians
- Diocese: Westminster
- Website: https://www.stedmundscollege.org/

St Edmund's College is a coeducational private day and boarding school in the British public school tradition, set in 440 acres (1.8 km^{2}) in Ware, Hertfordshire. Founded in 1568 as a seminary, then a boys' school, it is the oldest continuously operating (Note: a claim disputed by several works including but not exclusive to America : A Catholic Review of the Week 1931-01-24: Vol 44 Iss 16) and oldest post-Reformation Catholic school in the country. Today it caters for boys and girls aged 3 to 18.

== History ==
=== Douai: 1568–1793 ===
St Edmund's College is a continuation on English soil of the English College that was founded by William Cardinal Allen at Douai in Flanders, France, in 1568. Originally intended as a seminary to prepare priests to work in England to keep Catholicism alive, it soon also became a boys' school for Catholics, who were debarred from running such institutions in England. Many of its students, both priests and laymen, returned to England to be put to death under the anti-Catholic laws. The college includes amongst its former alumni 20 canonised and 138 beatified martyrs.

=== Silkstead, Twyford, Standon and Old Hall Green: 1662–1793 ===
A small Catholic school was started in Hampshire in the second half of the 17th century. It was opened by a priest at Silkstead some time before 1662, and transferred to Twyford, near Winchester. It was conducted in great secrecy, and was for boys of preparatory-school age who intended to proceed to the English College to complete more advanced studies. The poet Alexander Pope was a student at the school, although he did not proceed to Douay. Twyford was closed in 1745 on account of anti-Catholic feeling caused by the Jacobite rising, but Bishop Richard Challoner re-established the school in Hertfordshire at Standon Lordship in 1753, in a property owned by the Aston family. In 1769, Bishop James Talbot moved the school to its current site at Old Hall Green, near Puckeridge, and it became known as Old Hall Green Academy.

=== Old Hall Green: 1793–present ===
The work of the English College in Douay was brought to an end by the French Revolution, and in October 1793 the college property was confiscated. Professors and students came back to England, where Relief Acts had considerably relaxed the penal laws against Catholics. John Douglass, Vicar Apostolic of the London District, realised that the time had come to replace the English College, and the earliest refugees joined the students at Old Hall Green Academy. On 16 November 1793 – the feast of St Edmund of Canterbury – a new college was instituted. This was the beginning of a restoration of Catholic colleges and seminaries throughout England. Students from the North had established a separate foundation, which is now Ushaw College, near Durham by the time that the remaining staff and students arrived from Douay by 1795 to join St Edmund's College.

A gift of £10,000 from John Sone, a Hampshire Catholic, enabled St Edmund's to be established in new buildings, designed by James Taylor of Islington, who had himself been a student at the Old Hall Green Academy. A chapel and refectory were added in 1805 by Bishop Poynter, who succeeded Dr. Stapleton as president in 1801. Thomas Griffiths, Vicar Apostolic of the London District, was the college's president from 1818 until 1834, and did much to give the college a sound financial basis, culminating in a project for a large Gothic chapel designed by Pugin, completed in 1853. Nevertheless, the fortunes of the college varied throughout the 19th century and at times it seemed as if it might have to close. It was the seminary for the "London district" until 1850, when it became the joint property of the Sees of Westminster.

The era of Vicars Apostolic ended in 1850 with the restoration of the Hierarchy. Strachey, in his Eminent Victorians, portrays the college as the scene of a dispute between Henry Edward Manning and Dr Errington over whether a recusant or an ultramontane style should prevail there, and ultimately over who was to succeed Wiseman as second Cardinal Archbishop of Westminster.

In 1869, Manning, now Archbishop, set up a seminary in Hammersmith, and for the first time St Edmund's ceased to be a theological college. In 1874, the junior boys were separated from the rest of the college into St Hugh's Preparatory School, in a house originally built by Pugin for the Oxford convert William George Ward. The prep school has since been renamed St Edmund's Preparatory School.

In 1893, Bernard Ward, was appointed president and started a scheme of rebuilding and improvements. Numbers in the school increased significantly, and in 1904 Archbishop Francis Bourne decided to return the seminarians to the college. A new wing was built to house them, and this part of the college eventually became known as Allen Hall, after Cardinal Allen, founder of the English College at Douay.

The college became considerably run down during the First World War. On the walls leading up to the Chapel there are memorials to eighty-two former students who fell during World War I. A legacy became available to Cardinal Bourne, which was used to carry out badly needed repairs and additions.

The college celebrated the 400th anniversary of its foundation in 1968. In 1975 the seminarians departed for the second time, moving to Chelsea but retaining the name of Allen Hall. The school expanded considerably in the 1970s. In 1974, girls from the nearby Poles Convent and elsewhere were admitted into the sixth form as the first step towards complete coeducation, which was accomplished with the closure of Poles Convent in 1986. In 1996, an infants' department was added to the junior school, meaning that St Edmund's would now educate pupils aged 3–18. St Edmund's College celebrated its 450th anniversary in 2018.

== Houses ==
Heads of house, assisted by a team of tutors, provide continuity of care throughout students' time at the college and are the normal means of contact between the college and parents. House spirit is encouraged through various inter-house competitions, sporting and cultural, and through house celebrations, ranging from formal dinners to summer barbecues.

There are five houses (years of foundation in brackets):

- Challoner (1922)
- Douglass (1922)
- Pole (1990)
- Poynter (1970)
- Talbot (1922)

There are five former houses (years of existence in brackets):

- Allen Hall (1922–1975)
- Griffiths (1972–1984)
- Junior House (1945–1953 and 1961–1993)
- Margaret Pole (1975–1990)
- Stapleton (1975–1996)

== Boarding ==
Pupils may choose to board full time or on certain days of the week. There are two main boarding houses: Allen Hall (boys) and Garvey's (girls). The accommodation areas are supervised by residential staff.

== The Edmundian Association ==
The Edmundian Association was founded in 1853 and has members throughout the world. Its aim is to maintain a bond between the college and its alumni, and among members. Membership is available to past pupils of the college and their parents, parents of current pupils, and current and past members of staff.

=== Notable former pupils ===
==== Lay persons ====
- Chizzy Akudolu (born 1973) – actress on BBC drama Holby City
- Jimmy Alcock (born 1932) – British-Venezuelan architect
- Francis Barraud (1856–1924) – painter of the His Master's Voice trademark
- Alan Burns (1887–1980) – diplomat
- Michel Jean Cazabon (1813–1888) – artist
- Siobhan Daly (living) – producer and artistic director
- Sikhanyiso Dlamini (born 1987) – Princess of Swaziland
- Simon Geoghegan (born 1968) – Irish international rugby player
- Everard Green (1844–1926) – Rouge Dragon Pursuivant and Somerset Herald, College of Arms
- Edward Henry (1850–1931) – pioneer of fingerprint usage in crime investigations
- Tommie Hoban (born 1994) – professional footballer
- Javier Iturriaga (born 1983) – professional footballer
- James Lynam Molloy (1837–1909) – poet
- Laurence Meynell (1899–1989) – novelist and children's writer
- Nick Nieland (born 1972) – Commonwealth Games javelin gold medallist
- Mervyn O'Gorman (1871–1958) – aeronautical engineer
- Joseph O'Sullivan (1897–1922) – Irish nationalist
- Henry Oxenham (1829–1888) – controversialist and poet
- Everard Phillipps VC (1835–1857) – hero of the Indian Mutiny
- William Scholl (1882–1968) – footwear designer and businessman
- Neville Stack (1896–1949) – test pilot, air racer and aviation pioneer
- Aiden Turner (born 1977) – actor
- Paul Alexander Zino (1916–2004) – ornithologist, after whom Zino's petrel is named

==== Clergy ====
- Francis Bourne (1861–1935) – Archbishop of Westminster, also buried here
- Adrian Fortescue (1874–1923) – priest, scholar and adventurer
- Reginald C. Fuller (1908–2011) – scripture scholar
- Daniel Gilbert – Canon and Vicar General of the Diocese of Westminster 1868–95; founder of Providence Row Night Refuge
- Bruce Kent (born 1929) – deconsecrated Roman Catholic priest and anti-war campaigner
- David Konstant (1930–2016) – 8th Bishop of Leeds
- Ronald Knox (1888–1957) – satirist, essayist, novelist and translator
- Declan Lang (born 1950) – Bishop of Clifton (2001 to 2024)
- George Michael Lenihan (1858–1910) – Fifth Catholic Bishop of Auckland, New Zealand (1896–1910)
- Edward Myers (1875–1956) – president of St Edmund's College 1918–32, Coadjutor Archbishop of Westminster 1951–6, Titular Archbishop of Beroea, editor, Clergy Review; namesake of Archbishop Myers Secondary School, now St Mark's Catholic School, Hounslow
- Frederick Oakeley (1802–1880) – translator of the carol "Adeste Fideles" into English
- Clement Henry Parsons – founder and first headmaster of Finchley Catholic High School
- James Scanlan (1899–1976) – Archbishop of Glasgow
- George Stack (born 1946) – Archbishop of Cardiff
- Herbert Vaughan (1832–1903) – Archbishop of Westminster
- Derek Worlock (1920–1996) – Archbishop of Liverpool
