= James Talbot (bishop) =

English Roman Catholic bishop (1726–1790)

The Right Reverend James Robert Talbot
- Vicar Apostolic of the London District
- Appointed: 10 March 1759 (co-adjutor)
- Installed: 12 January 1781
- Term ended: 26 January 1790
- Predecessor: Richard Challoner
- Successor: John Douglass
- Other post: Titular Bishop of Birtha

Orders
- Ordination: 19 December 1750
- Consecration: 24 August 1759 by Richard Challoner

Personal details
- Born: James Robert Talbot; 28 June 1726 Isleworth, Middlesex
- Died: 26 January 1790 (aged 63) Hammersmith, Middlesex
- Denomination: Roman Catholic
- Parents: George Talbot and Mary FitzWilliam
- Education: English College, Douai

James Robert Talbot (28 June 1726 – 26 January 1790) was an English Catholic prelate who served as Vicar Apostolic of the London District from 1781 until his death. He was the last Catholic priest to be indicted in the country's public courts for saying Mass.

== Life ==
=== Early life ===
He was born at Shrewsbury House in Isleworth, Middlesex on 28 June 1726, the fourth son of the Honourable George Talbot and Mary FitzWilliam. James' eldest brother George succeeded his uncle as the 14th Earl of Shrewsbury in 1743, and his younger brother Thomas became Vicar Apostolic of the Midland District in 1778. After his baptism, he was confirmed by Bishop Bonaventure Giffard according to the custom of the time.

James was educated at Twyford School, then the English College, Douai. After his course in Philosophy, he and his brother Thomas Talbot made the grand tour under the tutelage of Alban Butler. They returned to Douai after over a year in 1748, and took up the course in Theology. James Talbot was ordained to the priesthood on 19 December 1750. He was then made a professor Philosophy, and two years later, Theology. in 1753, the presented the school with a country house at Equerchin, which became a school for younger students.

Talbot returned to England in 1755. At the age of thirty-three, he was appointed the Coadjutor bishop to Dr Richard Challoner, on 10 March 1759. On the same day, Talbot was appointed Titular Bishop of Birtha, and consecrated to the Episcopate by Bishop Challoner in Hammersmith on 24 August 1759. During his episcopate he was twice brought to trial, on the information lodged by the well-known informer William Payne, in 1769 and 1771 respectively. In each case he was acquitted for lack of evidence, but the judge, Lord Mansfield, was seen as being on Talbot's side, in consequence of which, although he was no friend to Roman Catholics in general, his London house was sacked during the Gordon Riots of 1780.

=== Apostolic Vicar ===
On the death of Bishop Challoner in 1781, Talbot became Vicar Apostolic of the London District, which he ruled for nine years. There were seven chapels in London, and being illegal, four were located in foreign embassies: Portuguese, Neapolitan, Bavarian, and Sardinian. A fifth chapel in Moorfields was designated a "warehouse". Moorfields was the site of some of the most violent rioting during the Gordon Riots. Bishop Talbot rebuilt the damaged and destroyed chapels with charitable contributions from Spain.

The London district included ten counties, besides the Channel Islands and the British possessions in America—chiefly Maryland and Pennsylvania and some West Indian islands. The closest bishop was in Quebec. In 1783, Talbot refused to grant faculties to preach and hear confessions to two priests returning to America, claiming he no longer had jurisdiction. On 9 June 1784, John Carroll was appointed and confirmed by Pope Pius VI as provisional "Superior of the Missions in the thirteen United States of North America", with faculties to celebrate the sacrament of Confirmation.

He lived a retired life in Hammersmith, his charitable nature gaining for him the title of "the Good Bishop Talbot". His chief work during these years was the completion of the purchase of the property at Old Hall, Hertfordshire, where he had a preparatory academy which afterwards developed into St Edmund's College. The penal laws against Roman Catholic schools still existed, and Talbot was again threatened with imprisonment; but he contrived to evade punishment.

During the last years of his life the Catholic Committee was already threatening trouble. In order to control it, Bishop Talbot allowed himself to be elected a member; but it was soon evident that the laymen were beyond the control of the hierarchy. The crisis however had not yet arrived when in 1790 Talbot died at his house at Hammersmith.

Bishop Talbot was buried in the cemetery of the parish church in Hammersmith. In 1901 his body was moved to Mortuary Lane at Old Hall, which leads to the St. Edmund's College Chapel.

== Legacy ==
One of the houses at St. Edmund's College is named in honor of James Talbot.

== Sources ==
- "Bishop James Robert Talbot". Catholic-Hierarchy.org. David M. Cheney.
- "James Talbot, Royal Offences > religious offences, 20th February 1771". The proceedings of the Old Bailey.
- Brady, W. Maziere (1876). The Episcopal Succession in England, Scotland and Ireland, A.D. 1400 to 1875. Vol. 3. Rome: Tipografia Della Pace. pp. 176–178.
- Schofield, Nicholas; Skinner, Gerard (2009). The English Vicars Apostolic. Oxford: Family Publications. pp. 44–49. ISBN 978-1-907380-01-3.

Catholic Church titles
Preceded by Richard Challoner	Vicar Apostolic of the London District; 1781–1790	Succeeded by John Douglass
