= Henri-Pons de Thiard de Bissy =

Roman Catholic priest, bishop and cardinal

His Eminence Henri-Pons de Thiard de Bissy
- Cardinal, Bishop of Meaux
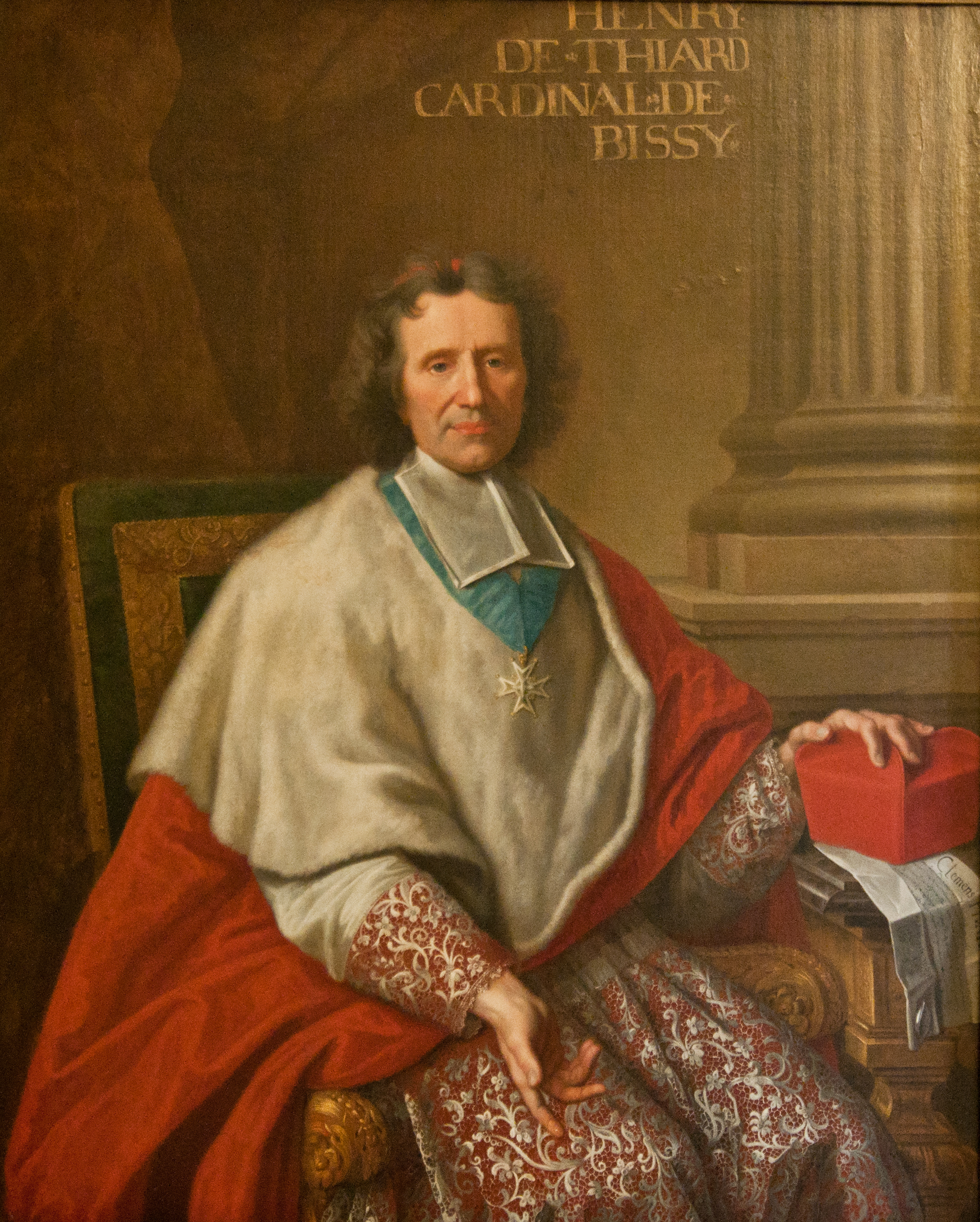
- Church: Roman Catholic Church
- Diocese: Meaux
- See: Meaux Cathedral
- Appointed: 10 May 1704
- Term ended: 26 July 1737
- Other post: Cardinal-Priest of San Bernardo alle Terme
- Previous posts: Cardinal-Priest of Santi Quirico e Giulitta (1721-1730); Bishop of Toul (1687-1704)

Orders
- Consecration: 24 August 1692 by Hardouin Fortin de la Hoguette
- Created cardinal: 29 May 1715 by Pope Clement XI
- Rank: Cardinal-Priest

Personal details
- Born: 25 May 1657 Paris, France
- Died: 26 July 1737 (aged 80) Paris, Kingdom of France

Henri-Pons de Thiard de Bissy (25 May 1657 – 26 July 1737) was a French priest who was Bishop of Toul from 1687 to 1704, Bishop of Meaux from 1704 to 1737, and Cardinal from 1715 to 1737.

== Biography ==
Henri Pons Thiard Bissy was born on 25 May 1657 in Pierre-de-Bresse. Destined for an ecclesiastical career, he was first licensed as a doctor at the Sorbonne in 1685. Appointed Bishop of Toul on 29 March 1687, disputes between Rome and King Louis XIV prevented the sending of papal bulls, and his appointment was not confirmed until 10 March 1692. He was ordained Bishop on 24 August 1692.

He took part in disputes arising in Lorraine against the edicts of Leopold I of Lorraine, which were considered to be contrary to the jurisdiction and authority of the Church. On 10 May 1704 he was appointed Bishop of Meaux, confirmed on 9 February 1705. He succeeded the famous Jacques-Bénigne Bossuet in this post.

He was elevated to cardinal on 29 May 1715 and became Commander of the Order of the Holy Spirit in 1724. He attended three conclaves in Rome in 1721, 1724 and 1730. He is best known for his defense of the Unigenitus Bull, which was aimed against the Jansenists in France. His book Traité Théologique sur la constitution Unigenitus in two volumes is one of the most comprehensive on the subject. He also wrote the Pastoral Instructions. He died on 26 July 1737.

== Consecrations ==
Cardinal Bissy was the principal consecrator of:

- John Talbot Stonor, Vicar Apostolic of Midland District (England), Titular Bishop of Thespians (it) (1716);
- Bartolomeo Massei, titular archbishop in Athens (it) (1721), afterwards cardinal;
- Gilbert Gaspard de Montmorin de Saint-Hérem de La Chassaigne, bishop of Aire (1723);
- Charles-Antoine de La Roche-Aymon, Auxiliary Bishop of Limoges, Titular Bishop of Zarephath (it) (1725), afterwards cardinal;
- Pierre-Guillaume de La Vieuxville, Bishop of Bayonne (1728);
- Georges-Lazare Berger de Charancy, bishop of Saint-Papoul (1735).
