= Thomas Flanagan (priest) =

English Catholic priest and historian

Thomas Flanagan (born in England in 1814; died at Kidderminster, 21 July 1865) was an English Catholic priest and historian.

== Life ==
Irish by descent, he was educated at Sedgley Park School. At the age of eighteen he proceeded to Oscott - that is "Old Oscott", now known as Maryvale - to study for the priesthood. The president at that time was Henry Weedall, under whose supervision the new college buildings were about to be erected. The students and professors migrated there in 1838, after the summer vacation, Flanagan being thus one of the original students at the new college. There he was ordained in 1842, Bishop Nicholas Wiseman being then president. Flanagan, who had worked hard as a student, was asked by Wiseman to remain as a professor.

In 1847 Flanagan brought out his first book, a small manual of British and Irish history, containing numerous statistical tables. The same year he became prefect of studies and acted successfully in that capacity until 1850, when he was appointed vice-president and then president of Sedgley Park School, and he became one of the first canons of the newly formed Birmingham Diocese in 1851. He resumed his former position at Oscott first in 1853 and again for an 18-month period beginning in 1858. The last years of his life were spent as assistant priest at St. Chad's Cathedral, Birmingham.

He died at Kidderminster.

== Works ==
His chief work was a History of the Church in England. In order to allow him more leisure for this, he was appointed chaplain to the Hornyold family at Blackmore Park in Worcestershire, and his history appeared in two volumes, during his residence there, in 1857. It was at that time the only complete work on the Roman Catholic Church in England, continued down to his times, and, though marred by some inaccuracies, it showed work and research on the part of the author. His style, however, was somewhat concise, and Bishop William Ullathorne remarked that Canon Flanagan was a compiler of history rather than a vivid historian.
