= Hierocaesarea =

Town and bishopric in the late Roman province of Lydia

Coordinates: 38°47′51″N 27°47′31″E

Hierocaesarea or Hierokaisareia, from the Greek for 'sacred' and the Latin for 'Caesar's', also known as Hieracome or Hierakome, was a town and bishopric in the late Roman province of Lydia, the metropolitan see of which was Sardis. It was inhabited during Hellenistic, Roman, and Byzantine times.

== History ==
This town is mentioned by Ptolemy. Judging from its coins, it worshipped the goddess Artemis Persica.

Its site is located between Sazoba and Kumkuyucak in Asiatic Turkey.

== Archaeology ==
Several funerary inscriptions from the Roman Imperial period have been discovered at the site of ancient Hierokaisareia. These inscriptions, carved on stone chests and stelae, are now preserved in the Manisa Museum. Among the finds is a limestone burial chest bearing the names Nikanor and Fulvia. A second chest, recovered alongside it, contains a fragmentary inscription that includes the name Apollonios, with the remainder of the text too incomplete to reconstruct fully; it may have originally recorded the deceased's profession.

== Bishopric ==
It is mentioned as an episcopal see in all the Notitiae Episcopatuum until the 12th or 13th century, but only three of its bishops are known:

- Cosinius, at the Council of Chalcedon, 451;
- Zacharias, at the Second Council of Nicaea, 787;
- Theodore, at the Council of Constantinople (879-880).

The see remains a (vacant) titular see in the Roman Catholic Church, with nominal bishops appointed.

- Bishop Ernesto de Paula (1960.01.09 – 1994.12.31)
- Bishop Timothy Phelim O'Shea, OFMCap (1950.05.24 – 1959.04.25)
- Bishop Franz Justus Rarkowski, SM (1938.01.07 – 1950.02.09)
- Bishop John Marie Laval (1911.09.11 – 1937.06.04)
- Bishop Giuseppe Astuni (1903.01.21 – 1911.02.21)
- Bishop Alessandro Beniamino Zanecchia-Ginnetti, OCD (1902.06.09 – 1902.06.18)
- Bishop Désiré-François-Xavier Van Camelbeke, MEP (1884.01.15 – 1901.11.09)
- Bishop Luigi Bienna (1845.04.24 – 1882.07.02)
- Bishop John Bede Polding, OSB (later Archbishop) (1832.07.03 – 1842.04.05)
- Bishop-elect José Seguí, OESA (later Archbishop) (1829.07.27 – 1830.07.05)
- Bishop Antonio Maria Trigona (later Archbishop) (1806.03.31 – 1817.07.28)
- Bishop Gregory Stapleton (1800.11.07 – 1802.05.23)
- Bishop Charles Berington (1786.06.02 – 1798.06.08)
- Bishop Santiago Hernández, OP (1757.08.13 – 1777.02.06)
- Bishop Louis-Joseph de Châteauneuf de Rochebonne (1720.03.04 – 1722.03.01)

== Sources ==
- Herbermann, Charles, ed. (1913). "Hierocæsarea". Catholic Encyclopedia. New York: Robert Appleton Company.
