= Thomas Talbot (bishop) =

English bishop

- Vicar Apostolic of Midland District
- Church: Catholic Church
- See: Apostolic Vicariate of the Midland District
- In office: 26 December 1778 – 24 February 1795
- Predecessor: John Hornyold
- Successor: Charles Berington
- Other post: Titular Bishop of Akka (1766-1795)
- Previous post: Coadjutor Vicar Apostolic of the Midland District (1766-1778)

Orders
- Ordination: 19 December 1752
- Consecration: March 1766 by John Hornyold

Personal details
- Born: 17 February 1727 Heythrop, Oxfordshire, Kingdom of Great Britain
- Died: 24 February 1795 (aged 68) Bristol, Somersetshire, Kingdom of Great Britain

Thomas Joseph Talbot (17 February 1727 – 24 February 1795) was an English Roman Catholic bishop who served as the Vicar Apostolic of the Midland District from 1778 until his death in 1795.

== Life ==
Thomas Talbot was born in Heythrop, Oxfordshire on 17 February 1727, the fifth son of the Honourable George Talbot and Mary FitzWilliam. Thomas' eldest brother, George, succeeded as the 14th Earl of Shrewsbury, and another brother, James, was the Vicar Apostolic of the London District.

He attended Twyford School, and then Douai in 1739. In 1745–46, together with his brother James, he made the grand tour under the tutelage of Alban Butler. He then returned to Douai to study theology.

On the expulsion of the Jesuits from France, Talbot was named President of the College of St. Omer's in August, 1762. In March 1776, he was consecrated to the titular See of Acon as coadjutor to Bishop Hornyold, whom he succeeded in the government of the Midland District in December, 1778.

Bishop Talbot died in Bristol on 24 February 1795, and was buried in St. Joseph's Church in Trenchard Street. One of the tombs bears a small metal tablet inscribed "Charles Thomas Talbot Esq^{re}", a burial from 1838, this may also be Thomas's tomb.

Catholic Church titles
Preceded by John Joseph Hornyold	Vicar Apostolic of the Midland District; 1778–1795	Succeeded by Charles Berington
