= Alban Butler =

English Catholic priest (1710–1773)

Alban Butler (13 October 1710 – 15 May 1773) was an English Roman Catholic priest and hagiographer. Born in Northamptonshire, he studied at the English College in Douay, France, where he later taught philosophy and theology. He served as a guide on the Grand Tour to the nephews of the Earl of Shrewsbury. Upon his return in 1749, Butler was made chaplain to the Duke of Norfolk. He was appointed president of the English seminary at Saint Omer in France. Butler is mainly known for his Lives of the Saints, the result of thirty years of work.

== Biography ==
Alban Butler was born in 1710, at Appletree, Aston le Walls, Northamptonshire, the second son of Simon Butler, Esq. His father died when he was young and he was sent to the Lancashire boarding school run by Dame Alice. He went on to a Catholic further education at the English College, Douai, in France. In 1735, Butler was ordained a priest. At Douai, he was appointed professor of philosophy, and later professor of theology. It was at Douai that he began his principal work The Lives of the Fathers, Martyrs and Other Principal Saints. He also prepared material for Richard Challoner's Memoirs of Missionary Priests, a work on the martyrs of the reign of Elizabeth.

In 1745, Butler came to the attention of the Duke of Cumberland, younger son of King George II, for his devotion to the wounded English soldiers during the defeat at the Battle of Fontenoy.

Around 1746, Butler served as tutor and guide on the Grand Tour to James and Thomas Talbot, nephews of Gilbert Talbot, 13th Earl of Shrewsbury. Their elder brother, George, succeeded their uncle as 14th Earl of Shrewsbury. Both James and Thomas Talbot later became Catholic bishops.

Butler returned to England in 1749 and was made chaplain to the Duke of Norfolk, whose nephew and heir, the Hon. Edward Howard, Butler accompanied to Paris as tutor. While he was in Paris, Butler completed his Lives.

He laboured for some time as a missionary priest in Staffordshire, and was finally appointed president of the English seminary at Saint Omer in France, where he remained until his death. During his term as President of the English seminary, Butler also served the bishops of Arras, Saint-Omer, Ypres, and Boulogne-sur-Mer as their Vicar-General. Butler died in Saint-Omer in 1773 and was buried in the parish church of Saint-Denis.

See An Account of the Life of A. B. by C. B., i.e. by his nephew Charles Butler (London, 1799); and Joseph Gillow's Bibliographical Dictionary of English Catholics, vol. i.

== The Lives of Saints ==
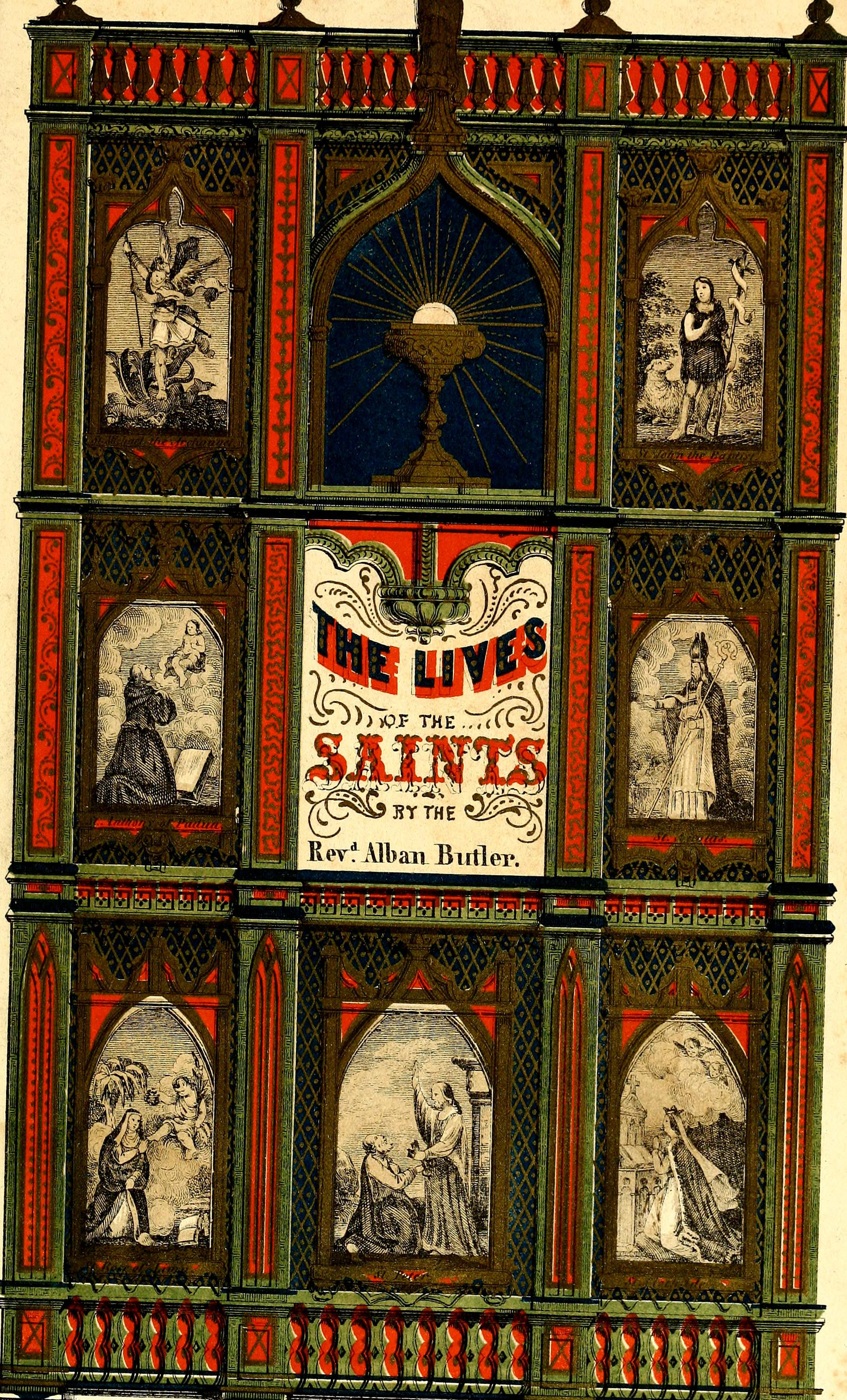
The Lives of the Saints

Butler's great work, The Lives of the Fathers, Martyrs, and Other Principal Saints ("Butler's Lives"), was written over thirty years. It was first published in four volumes in London, from 1756 to 1759.

More than just a translation of the Acta Sanctorum, "The Lives of the Saints" adds Butler's own unique voice and perspective, as well as his research and study. It has been called "the best compendium of Acta in English" and has had many editions, revisions, alterations, and translations over the centuries since it was first published.

=== The first edition (1756–1759) ===
This edition was printed initially in four octavo volumes, with no stated publisher or author's name. However, they were so thick that they were usually bound in more volumes. There were actually six title pages since Vol. 3 and Vol. 4 both have a "part 2" issued thus: vol. 1, vol. 2, vol. 3, vol. 3 part 2, vol. 4, and vol. 4 part 2. Each "volume" contained three months of the liturgical calendar's Saints' lives. Vol. 1 also had a copperplate engraving with figures of the Roman devices of torture used, and a two-page explanation of their use.

Charles Butler's assertion that "all the notes" were left out of the first edition at the suggestion of Bishop Challoner is exaggerated. There are many useful, and even extended, notes in the first edition, but not to the extent that they appear in the second and succeeding editions. According to Charles Knight, the 1847 edition published in twelve volumes is considered the best and most complete.

=== Modern editions ===
Since Fr. Butler published his original edition of his Lives, many successors have revised and updated the work. Father Herbert Thurston, SJ, edited and significantly rewrote the work; his 12-volume "Revised Edition" was published between 1926 and 1938.
