= John Stonor (bishop) =

English Catholic bishop (1678–1756)

- Vicar Apostolic of Midland District
- Church: Catholic Church
- See: Apostolic Vicariate of the Midland District
- In office: 18 September 1715 – 29 March 1756
- Predecessor: George Witham
- Successor: John Hornyold
- Other post: Titular Bishop of Thespiae (1715-1756)

Orders
- Ordination: February 1711
- Consecration: 9 August 1716 by Henri-Pons de Thiard de Bissy

Personal details
- Born: 1678 Stonor Park, Oxfordshire, Kingdom of England
- Died: 29 March 1756 (aged 77–78) Stonor Park, Oxfordshire, Kingdom of Great Britain

John Talbot Stonor (1678–1756) was an English Roman Catholic bishop who served as the Vicar Apostolic of the Midland District from 1715 to 1756.

Born in 1678, he was appointed the Vicar Apostolic of the Midland District and Titular Bishop of Thespiae by the Holy See on 18 September 1715. He was consecrated to the Episcopate on 9 August 1716, the principal consecrator was Cardinal Henri-Pons de Thiard de Bissy, Bishop of Meaux, France. Bishop Stonor did much to persuade Catholics to accept the Hanoverian monarchy, which resulted in greater tolerance towards Catholics.

He died in office on 29 March 1756, aged 78.

Catholic Church titles
Preceded by George Witham	Vicar Apostolic of the Midland District; 1715–1756	Succeeded by John Joseph Hornyold
