= Old Hall Green =

Hamlet in Hertfordshire, England

Coordinates: 51.88°N 00.01°W

- Location within Hertfordshire
- OS grid reference: TL3722
- Shire county: Hertfordshire
- Region: East
- Country: England
- Sovereign state: United Kingdom
- Post town: Ware
- Postcode district: SG11
- Police: Hertfordshire
- Fire: Hertfordshire
- Ambulance: East of England

Old Hall Green is a hamlet in Hertfordshire, England. At the 2011 Census the population was included in the civil parish of Standon.

In 1793, an academy, St Edmund's College, Ware, was established there which provided a school for Catholic boys and a seminary to train priests serving England's recusant community. St Edmund's College was one of two facilities which replaced the English College at Douai, which had to be evacuated because of the French Revolution. Whilst the school remains, the seminary was moved to Chelsea in 1975.

== See also ==
- Old Hall Manuscript
