= Charles Butler (lawyer) =

English lawyer and writer

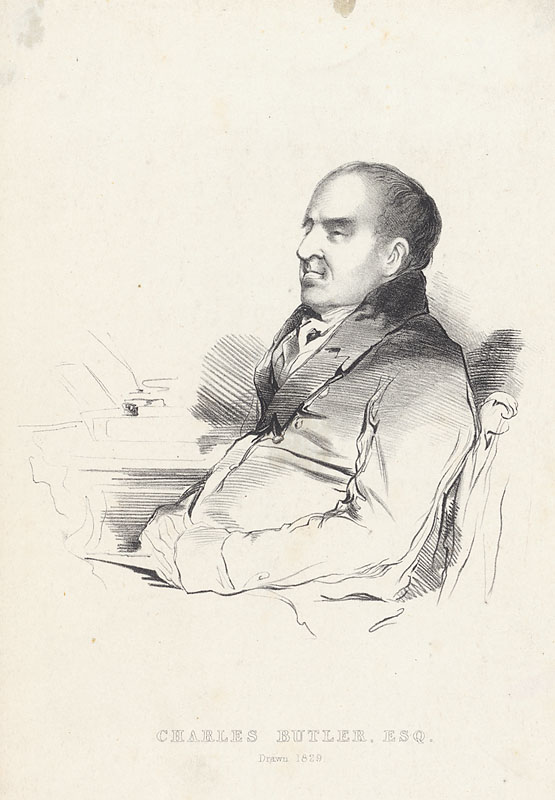
Charles Butler.

Charles Butler KC (14 August 1750 – 2 June 1832) was an English Roman Catholic lawyer and miscellaneous writer.

== Biography ==
Charles Butler was born in London, the son of James Butler, a nephew of Alban Butler. He was educated at Douai. In 1769 he became apprenticed to the conveyancer John Maire, and subsequently (on Maire's death in 1773) to Matthew Duane. In 1775 he set up his own conveyancing practice and entered Lincoln's Inn. He edited, with Francis Hargrave, Coke upon Lyttleton, published in 1775. Peter Bellinger Brodie was one of his students.

A 1777 pamphlet supporting naval impressments won him the patronage of John Montagu, 4th Earl of Sandwich, but Butler withdrew from general political activity to press for Catholic relief. Secretary of the Catholic Committee from 1782, he was appointed by them to draft a new relief bill in 1788: despite controversy within the English Catholic community over the extent to which the Catholic condition should be assimilated to that of Protestant dissenters, a bill passed on 24 June 1791. In 1792 Butler helped found the Cisalpine Club "to resist any ecclesiastical interference which may militate against the freedom of English Catholics". Relations between cisalpine Catholics, minimising the authority of the Pope over English Catholics, and vicars apostolic (especially Butler's long-time opponent John Milner) were strained; in 1807 a Catholic Board was formed after efforts to repair relations, but Milner would censure Butler in 1822 as 'a rebel to ecclesiastical authority and a public sinner'.

He had considerable practice as a conveyancer, and after the passing of the Roman Catholic Relief Act 1791 was the first Catholic to be called to the bar since 1688. His only appearance at the bar was in Cholmondeley v. Clinton at the House of Lords, which set a precedent for judgements on land removal. In 1832 he took silk, and was made a bencher of Lincoln's Inn.

== Marriage ==
Butler married Mary Eyston in 1776; they had one son (who died young) and two daughters.

== Works ==
His literary activity was enormous, and the number of his published works comprises about fifty volumes. The most important of them are:

- Reminiscences (1821–1827)
- Horae Biblicae (1797), which passed through several editions
- Horae Juridicae Subsecivae (1804)
- Book of the Roman Catholic Church (1825), which was directed against Southey and excited some controversy
- lives of Erasmus, Grotius, Bossuet, Fénelon

He also edited and completed the Lives of the Saints of his uncle, Alban Butler, Fearne's Essay on Contingent Remainders and Hargrave's edition of Coke upon Littleton's Laws of England (1775).

A complete list of Butler's works is contained in Joseph Gillow's Bibliographical Dictionary of English Catholics, vol. i. pp. 357–364.
