= Apostolic Vicariate of the Midland District =

Roman Catholic ecclesiastical jurisdiction in England (1688-1850)

Vicariate Apostolic of the Midland District (later of the Central District)

Location
- Country: England
- Territory: Derbyshire, Leicestershire, Nottinghamshire, Oxfordshire, Shropshire, Staffordshire, Warwickshire, and Worcestershire, and until 1840 also Cambridgeshire (with the Isle of Ely), Huntingdonshire, Lincolnshire, Norfolk, Northamptonshire, Rutland and Suffolk

Information
- Denomination: Catholic Church
- Rite: Latin Rite
- Established: as the Midland District on 30 January 1688 and renamed the Central District on 3 July 1840
- Dissolved: 29 September 1850

The Vicariate Apostolic of the Midland District (later of the Central District) was an ecclesiastical jurisdiction of the Roman Catholic Church in England and Wales. It was led by a vicar apostolic who was a titular bishop. The Vicariate Apostolic of the Midland District was created in 1688 and changed its name to the Central District in 1840. It was dissolved in 1850 and was replaced by two dioceses.

== Background ==
Soon after the accession of Protestant Queen Elizabeth I, the bishops of England were forced to choose between taking the Oath of Supremacy, thus denying the authority of the Pope, and losing their episcopal sees. The great majority chose to continue their allegiance to Rome were subsequently deposed and replaced in their sees by Protestants of the Church of England. Most of the deposed Bishops were imprisoned in various locations and died in captivity over a period of years though some left the country and continued their work overseas. The last of the deposed bishops was Thomas Goldwell, Bishop of St Asaph, who died in Rome on 3 April 1585.

== Restoration: Vicar Apostolic of England ==
In 1623 Pope Urban VIII decided once again to appoint a bishop with jurisdiction in England. So it was that Dr William Bishop was appointed with the title of Vicar Apostolic of England. He died shortly afterwards and was succeeded by Dr Richard Smith, who in August 1631 was forced to resign and fled to France. The office then remained vacant until its revival in 1685 with the appointment of Dr John Leyburn as Vicar Apostolic.

== Geographical organisation ==
In 1623 the first Vicar Apostolic, Dr Bishop, divided England into six areas and placed a superior at the head of each with the title of vicar general.

This structure remained in place until Dr Leyburn reduced the number from six to four. It was on the basis of these four areas that on 20 January 1688 Pope Innocent XI increased the number of bishops in England to four, with the result that the territory of the former single Vicariate Apostolic of England and Wales was reduced, becoming the Vicariate Apostolic of the London District. So it was that the Vicariate Apostolic of the Midland District was created, along with those of the Northern and the Western (including Wales) Districts.

The first Vicar Apostolic of the Midland District, appointed with effect from 30 January 1688, was Bishop Bonaventure Giffard, who in 1703 was translated to become the Vicar Apostolic of the Vicariate Apostolic of the London District.

The Midland District consisted of the historic counties of Cambridgeshire (with the Isle of Ely), Derbyshire, Huntingdonshire, Leicestershire, Lincolnshire, Norfolk, Northamptonshire, Nottinghamshire, Oxfordshire, Rutland, Shropshire, Staffordshire, Suffolk, Warwickshire, and Worcestershire.

Notwithstanding intermittent persecution, a Vicariate Apostolic of the Midland District continued in existence until in 1840 when the existing four Vicariates were further divided. The Midland District was renamed the Central District on 3 July 1840, but it lost jurisdiction of the counties of Cambridgeshire (with the Isle of Ely), Huntingdonshire, Lincolnshire, Norfolk, Northamptonshire, and Rutland to the newly formed the Vicariate Apostolic of the Eastern District.

The Central District was to last only ten years, until on 29 September 1850, Pope Pius IX issued the Bull Universalis Ecclesiae, by which thirteen new dioceses were created, an event commonly known as the restoration of the English hierarchy, among them the diocese of Birmingham, which replaced formally the previous Vicariate Apostolic.

The last Vicar Apostolic of the Midland District was Bishop Thomas Walsh, who from 1840 till 1847 had the new title Vicar Apostolic of the Central District.

== Bishop and Archbishop of Birmingham ==
Bishop Walsh was succeeded as Vicar Apostolic of the Central District by the Benedictine William Bernard Ullathorne, who on 29 September 1850 received the new title of Bishop of Birmingham. On 28 October 1911 a new ecclesiastical province was created dependent on Birmingham, and the title became that of the Metropolitan Archbishop of Birmingham.

== List of Vicars Apostolic ==
=== Vicars Apostolic of the Midland District ===
Apostolic Vicars of the Midland District
From	Until	Incumbent	Notes
1687	1703	Bonaventure Giffard; Titular Bishop of Madaurus	Appointed vicar apostolic on 25 November 1687 and confirmed on 28 January 1688; also appointed titular bishop on 28 February 1688 and consecrated on 22 April 1688; moved to the London District on 14 March 1703
1702	1716	George Witham; Titular Bishop of Marcopolis	Appointed Vicar Apostolic and titular bishop on 12 August 1702; consecrated on 15 April 1703; moved to the Northern District on 6 April 1716
1715	1756	John Talbot Stonor; Titular Bishop of Thespiae	Appointed Vicar Apostolic and titular bishop on 18 September 1715; on consecrated 9 August 1716; died in office on 29 March 1756
1756	1778	John Joseph Hornyold; Titular Bishop of Philomelium	Appointed coadjutor apostolic vicar and titular bishop on 20 December 1751; consecrated on 10 February 1752; succeeded on 29 March 1756; died in office on 26 December 1778
1778	1795	Thomas Joseph Talbot; Titular Bishop of Acone	Appointed coadjutor Vicar Apostolic and titular bishop on 26 February 1766; consecrated in March 1766; succeeded on 26 December 1778; died in office in April 1795
1795	1798	Charles Berington; Titular Bishop of Hierocaesarea	Appointed coadjutor Vicar Apostolic and titular bishop on 2 June 1786; consecrated on 1 August 1786; succeeded on 24 April 1795; died in office on 8 June 1798
1800	1802	Gregory Stapleton; Titular Bishop of Hierocaesarea	Appointed Vicar Apostolic and titular bishop on 7 November 1800; consecrated on 8 March 1801; died in office on 23 May 1802
1803	1826	John Milner; Titular Bishop of Castabala	Appointed Vicar Apostolic and titular bishop on 6 March 1803; consecrated on 22 May 1803; died in office on 19 April 1826
1826	1840	Thomas Walsh; Titular Bishop of Cambysopolis	Appointed coadjutor apostolic vicar and titular bishop on 28 January 1825; consecrated on 1 May 1825; succeeded on 19 April 1826; through district rename, he became the apostolic vicar of the Central District on 3 July 1840
May 1840	July 1840	Nicholas Wiseman, Titular Bishop of Milopotamus	Appointed coadjutor Vicar Apostolic of the Midland District and titular bishop on 22 May 1840; consecrated on 8 June 1840; through district rename, he became coadjutor Vicar Apostolic of the Central District on 3 July 1840.

=== Vicars Apostolic of the Central District ===
Vicars Apostolic of the Central District
From	Until	Incumbent	Notes
1840	1848	Thomas Walsh; Titular Bishop of Cambysopolis	Hitherto Vicar Apostolic of the Midland District; became Vicar Apostolic of the Central District on 3 July 1840; moved to the London District on 17 July 1848
1840	1847	Nicholas Wiseman, Titular Bishop of Milopotamus	Hitherto coadjutor Vicar Apostolic of the Midland District; became coadjutor Vicar Apostolic of Central District on 3 July 1840; before succeeding, he was appointed coadjutor Vicar Apostolic of the London District on 29 August 1847
1848	1850	William Bernard Ullathorne, O.S.B., Titular Bishop of Etalonia	Formerly Vicar Apostolic of the Western District (1846–1848); appointed Vicar Apostolic of the Central District on 28 July 1848; became the first Bishop of Birmingham on 29 September 1850
In 1850, the jurisdiction was replaced by the dioceses of Birmingham and Shrewsbury.

== See also ==
- Catholic Church by country
- Catholic Church hierarchy
- Catholic Church in England and Wales
- Lists of patriarchs, archbishops, and bishops
- Roman Catholic bishops
- Roman Catholicism in England and Wales

== Bibliography ==
- Brady, W. Maziere (1876). The Episcopal Succession in England, Scotland and Ireland, A.D. 1400 to 1875. Vol. 3. Rome: Tipografia Della Pace.
