= Joseph Berington =

British Catholic writer and priest

Joseph Berington (16 January 1743 – 1 December 1827) was a priest and one of the prominent British Catholic writers of his day.

== Life ==
Joseph Berington, born at Winsley, Herefordshire, was educated at the English College at Douai. After his ordination to the priesthood he was promoted to the chair of philosophy in the university there. In this position his inclination towards liberal opinions became apparent, and his theses, prepared for the exhibition of his pupils, created such a stir that he thought it prudent to resign.

On his return to England, he occupied several positions in turn, each intended to give him leisure to pursue his studies. From 1776 to 1782 he was chaplain to Thomas Stapleton, of Carlton, Yorkshire, acting at the same time as tutor to his son, with whom he afterwards travelled around Europe. In December 1777, while in Paris, he wrote to Benjamin Franklin expressing his disappointment at Franklin's absence from the city at that time, and the hope to meet with him at a later date. He served next at St Mary's College, Oscott, then a lonely country mission, where his cousin, Charles Berington, who had been appointed coadjutor bishop, joined him.

In 1782, Berington was one of the co-founders of the first Catholic Committee, formed to represent the Catholics in their struggle for emancipation; which gained for itself a reputation for its liberalizing principles, and the generally anti-episcopal tendency of its action. The Midland District was the chief centre of these opinions, and fifteen of the clergy of Staffordshire formed themselves into an association of which Joseph Berington was the leader, the primary object being to stand by their bishop, Thomas Talbot, who was partly on that side. Afterwards, however, they were led into other action, especially in taking up the case of Joseph Wilkes, OSB, who had been suspended by his bishop in consequence of his action on the committee, which laid them open to criticism.

Joseph Berington was by this time becoming well known as an author with an attractive style of writing, and advanced views. His State and Behaviour of English Catholics (1780) contained more than one passage of doubtful orthodoxy; his History of Abelard (1784) brought into prominence the same philosophical tendencies which had before manifested at Douai; and his Reflexions, addressed to J. Hawkins, an apostate priest (1785 and 1788), were much criticized; while perhaps more than all, the Memoirs of Panzani, which he edited with an Introduction and Supplement (1793), gave him the reputation of being a disloyal Catholic. Under these circumstances, when Sir John Courtney Throckmorton of Buckland (then in Berkshire nowadays in Oxfordshire) appointed Berington his chaplain, Dr. Douglass, Bishop of the London District (in which Buckland was situated), refused to give him faculties, till in 1797 he printed a letter explaining his views, which the bishop considered satisfactory. A year or two later, Dr. Douglass again suspended him, until he signed a further declaration in 1801.

Berington passed the remainder of his life at Buckland, where he wrote the most extensive of all his works, The Literary History of the Middle Ages (1811). He published many other books at different times; but some of his writings remained in manuscript, lest their publication should give offence. In private life Joseph Berington was a model priest, exact in the discharge of his duties, and noted for his charity to the poor. He was respected by all who knew him, Catholic and Protestant alike, and after his death a slab was erected in his memory in the Anglican church at Buckland with an inscription written by his friend, John Bew, formerly president of Oscott.

== Works ==
- Letters on Materialism and Hartley's Theory of the Human Mind, Addressed to Dr. Priestley, F.R.S., London: G. Robinson, 1776.
- The State and Behaviour of English Catholics, From the Reformation to the Year 1780; With a View of Their Present Number, Wealth, Character, etc., London: R. Faulder, 1780.
- Reflections Addressed to the Rev. John Hawkins: To Which is Added, an Exposition of Roman Catholic Principles, in Reference to God and the Country, Birmingham: M. Swinney, 1785.
- Present State of Caths., 1787.
- Rights of Dissenters, 1789.
- The History of the Reign of Henry the Second, and of Richard and John, His Sons: With the Events of the Period from 1154 to 1216; in Which the Character of Thomas a Becket is Vindicated from the Attacks of George Lord Lyttelton, Volume 2, Dublin: L. White, P. Byrne, J. Moore, Greuber and McAllister, W. Jones, G. Draper, and R. White, 1790.
- The History of the Lives of Abeillard and Heloisa: Comprising a Period of Eighty-Four Years from 1079 to 1163: With Their Genuine Letters From the Collection of Amboise, Basil: J.J. Tourneisen, 1793.
- Examination of Events termed Miraculous, 1796.
- Gother's Prayers, 1800.
- Decline and Fall of Catholic Religion in England, 1813.
- A Literary History of the Middle Ages: Comprehending an Account of the State of Learning From the Close of the Reign of Augustus, London: J. Mawman, 1814.
- The Faith of Catholics: On Certain Points of Controversy; Confirmed by Scripture and Attested by the Fathers of the First Five Centuries of the Church, London: J. Booker, 1830.
- A reprint of Memoirs of Panzani.

== Notes ==
Attribution
