= Joseph Gillow =

English Roman Catholic antiquary, historian and bio-bibliographer

Joseph Gillow (5 October 1850, Preston, Lancashire – 17 March 1921, Westholme, Hale, Cheshire) was an English Roman Catholic antiquary, historian and bio-bibliographer, "the Plutarch of the English Catholics".

== Biography ==
Born in Frenchwood House, Lancashire, to a recusant English Roman Catholic family able to trace an uninterrupted pedigree back to Conishead Priory in 1325, Gillow was the son of a magistrate, Joseph Gillow (1801–1872), and his wife, Jane Haydock (1805–1872), a descendant of Christopher Haydock, a Lancashire politician and a member of another prominent recusant English Roman Catholic family, the Haydocks of Cottam.

Joseph Gillow was educated at Sedgley Park School, Wolverhampton (1862–1863) and St Cuthbert's College, Ushaw (1864–1866), where his brothers and uncles had studied for the priesthood. At Ushaw, Gillow developed an abiding interest in Lancashire Catholicism, resulting in the publication of The Tyldesley Diary in 1873.

In 1878 Gillow married Eleanor McKenna, daughter of John McKenna, of Dunham Massey Hall, with whom he had seven children. In marrying into the McKennas, Gillow secured himself a private income which allowed him to pursue his antiquarian interests.

Cardinal Gasquet described the dictionary as a ‘veritable storehouse of information’, however, until 1986, no index was available.

Gillow was appointed honorary recorder of the Catholic Record Society at its foundation in 1904, and was a frequent contributor.

== Works ==
- A Literary and Biographical History, or Bibliographical Dictionary, of the English Catholics, from the Breach with Rome, in 1534, to the Present Time, New York: Catholic Publication Society, 1885.
  - Volume 1
  - Volume 2
  - Volume 3
  - Volume 4
  - Volume 5
- The Tyldseley Diary (editor)
- The Haydock Papers: A Glimpse Into English Catholic Life Under the Shade of Persecution and in the Dawn of Freedom, New York: Burns & Oates, 1888.
- St. Thomas's Priory, or, The story of St. Austin's Stafford, London: Burns & Oates, 1894.
- Lancashire Recusants
- 'Lord Burghley's Map of Lancashire', Miscellanea of the Catholic Record Society, 4 (London, 1907), pp. 162–216 and frontispiece
- A Catalogue of the Martyrs in Englande for Profession of the Catholique Faith since the yeare of Our Lord 1535

== See also ==
- Paulyn Gillow
- Cardinal William Allen
- Richard Gillow
- Robert Gillow
- Brian Gillow
- Leighton Hall, Lancashire
- Eulogio Gillow y Zavalza
- Gillows of Lancaster and London
