= Sedgley Park School, Wolverhampton =

Former Roman Catholic school in England

Coordinates: 52°33′39″N 2°07′47″W

Sedgley Park School was a Roman Catholic Academy located on the northern outskirts of Sedgley, then part of Staffordshire. The school was founded by William Errington, at the request of Bishop Richard Challoner, on 25 March 1763.

== History ==
Errington made three unsuccessful attempts, the first in Buckinghamshire, the second in Wales, and the third at Betley near Newcastle-under-Lyne, in Staffordshire, before he succeeded in founding a permanent school at Sedgley Park in the neighbourhood of Wolverhampton. The object of the establishment of Sedgley Park was the education of the sons of middle and poorer class Catholics. On Lady-Day, 1763, he opened this school with twelve boys brought in covered wagon from Betley. The mansion, known as the Park Hall, was until 1757 the residence of John, Lord Ward, afterwards Viscount Dudley and Ward.

Errington rented the house from Baron Ward. The foundation was at once attacked in Parliament, but Lord Dudley successfully defended himself.

The house, a tall, square, brick building had such a number of windows on all sides, that when lighted up, led to its being called about the country, The Lantern. Errington secured the appointment of the Rev. Hugh Kendall as head-master in May, 1763, and he returned to Bishop Challoner in London, where he served as archdeacon till his death in 1768. Rev. John Hurst, from Betley served as chaplain. Enrolment increased rapidly, but the boys being mostly from the mercantile and middle class did not remain long at the school. Few stayed longer than three or four years, and many only one or two. General education included elementary instruction in reading, grammar, geography, writing, and arithmetic. The curriculum also offered French, Latin, and Greek. Kendall died in 1781, and was succeeded as president by his nephew, Rev. Thomas Southworth. By 1810 enrolment had reached 212.

In 1873 the school was moved to Cotton College, near Oakamoor but closed in 1987. The former school building is now in the suburb of Goldthorn Park that was transferred to Wolverhampton in 1966 when Sedgley Urban District was abolished and was converted into a hotel in 1981.
