= Louis Casartelli =

Catholic bishop (1852–1925)

The Right Reverend Louis Charles Casartelli
- Bishop of Salford
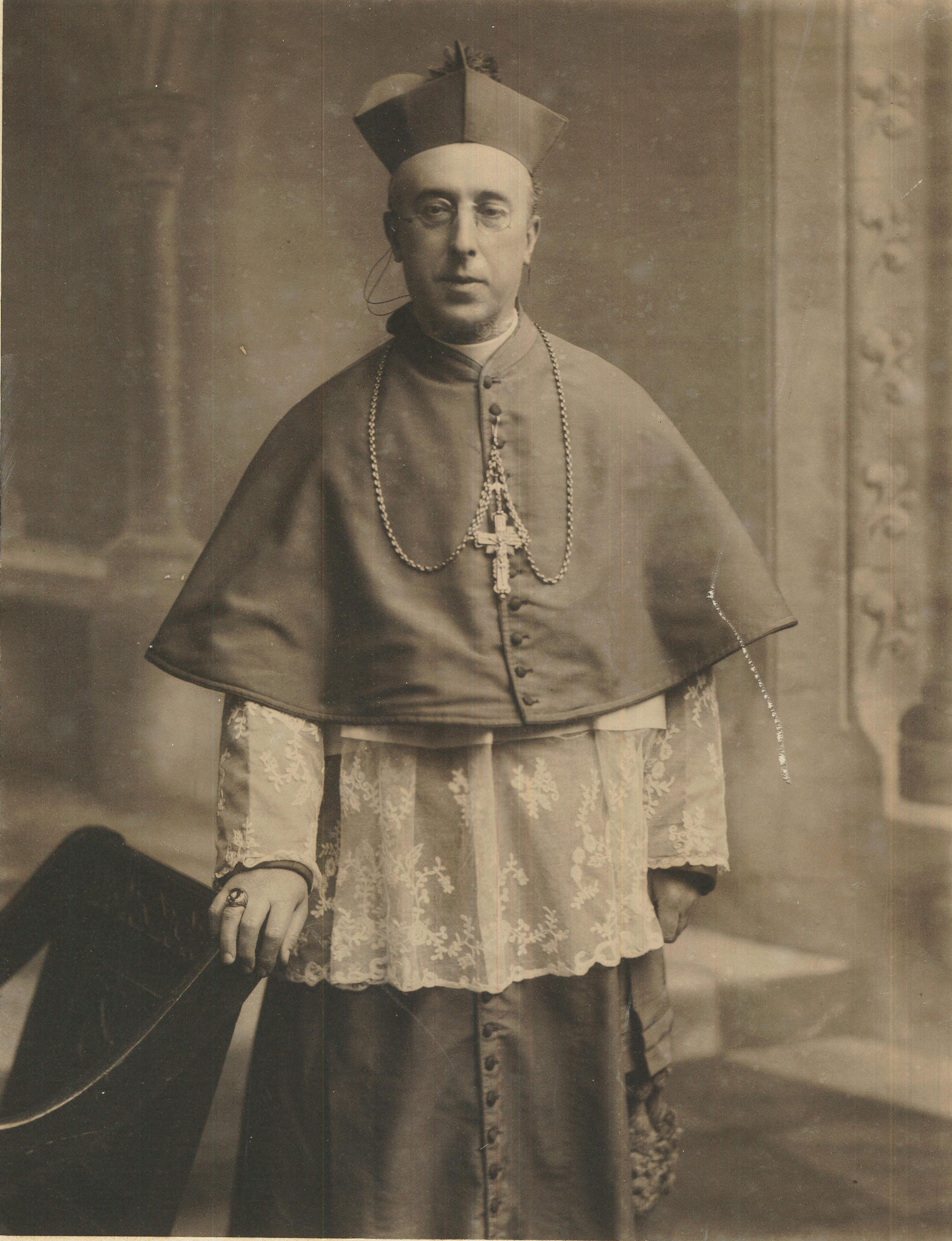
- Bishop of Salford 1903–1925
- Diocese: Salford
- Appointed: 28 August 1903
- Term ended: 18 January 1925
- Predecessor: John Bilsborrow
- Successor: Thomas Henshaw

Orders
- Ordination: 10 September 1876 by Herbert Vaughan
- Consecration: 21 September 1903 by Francis Bourne

Personal details
- Born: 14 November 1852 Cheetham Hill, Manchester, England
- Died: 18 January 1925 (aged 72) Salford, England
- Buried: St Joseph's Cemetery, Moston, Manchester, England
- Denomination: Roman Catholic
- Parents: Joseph Louis Casartelli and Jane Henrietta Casartelli (née Ronchetti)

Louis Charles Casartelli (14 November 1852 – 18 January 1925) was an English Catholic priest and was the fourth Bishop of Salford.

== Early life ==
Louis was born of Italian parents at 2 Clarence Street, Cheetham Hill, Manchester, 14 November 1852. His parents, Joseph Louis (an optician) and Jane Henrietta Casartelli (Ronchetti), had resided in the area for some time. He was believed to have been considered an intelligent boy, as well as displaying a pious attitude, something which was felt he learned from his mother.

== Education ==
From the age of nine he attended Salford Catholic Grammar School and became fluent in French, German, Italian and Spanish. Whilst there he came under the influence of two masters, Canon Augustus De Clerc and Bruno de Splenter. He subsequently went on to study at St Cuthbert's College, Ushaw where he won a gold medal for classics as well earning an MA degree externally from the University of London in 1873.

In 1874 he began specialist theological studies at the University of Louvain, in Belgium, where he also specialised in Eastern languages, an interest first acquired – so he said – through a chance encounter with a book in the Manchester Free Library. He was an avid diary keeper, often writing in several languages on the one page.

== Priesthood ==
Louis was ordained to the priesthood on 10 September 1876 by the then Bishop of Salford Herbert Vaughan. He was seconded to the teaching staff of St Bede's College, Manchester although in 1884 he returned once more to the University of Louvain and gained a doctorate in Oriental literature. Upon completion of his studies, he returned to St Bede's and in 1891 he was appointed rector. From 1898 he lectured five times each Lent term at Louvain, Sanskrit, Zend and Pahlavi becoming his specialities. He was lecturer in Iranian languages in the University of Manchester, and was invited to give the Katrak lecture in Iranian studies at Oxford University but although he accepted, in the event he was unable to give the lecture due to illness.

== Bishop ==
On 28 August 1903 Louis was appointed Bishop of Salford but wrote to Rome begging to decline. His appeal was rejected and he wrote to Abbot Francis Aidan Gasquet OSB "if the wish did not sound rather an impiety one could almost desire that Cardinal Gotti might have held me suspect of Liberalism and other dreadful things" (1 September 1903). He was consecrated in St John's Cathedral, on 21 September 1903 by Archbishop-elect Francis Bourne, with Bishops Thomas Whiteside and Samuel Webster Allen as co-consecrators.

The poor Catholics of Manchester and Salford took great pride in the appointment, and when challenged by the assertion that nobody with any intelligence could possibly be a Catholic, would reply "Well just look at our Bishop". Bishop Casartelli was one of the first bishops in England to attempt concerted Catholic Action. He produced a monthly journal The Federationist and never failed to make a contribution on contemporary issues. He became the founder and president of the Manchester Dante Society from 1906, The Catenian Association from 1908, Manchester Egyptian Association from 1908 to 1910, the president of the Manchester Statistical Society from 1898 to 1900 and a supporter of the Oriental, Geographical, Antiquarian and other societies. Casartelli contributed a number of articles to the Catholic Encyclopedia. On 18 December 1918 he was elected an honorary member of the Royal Asiatic Society which he declares in his diary of the day as "a most astonishing and unexpected honour." He was awarded the Order of Leopold.

== Works ==
- La philosophie religieuse du Mazdéisme sous les Sassanides (1884)

== Death ==
Bishop Casartelli died at his residence at St Bede's College, Manchester on 18 January 1925, and is buried in St Joseph's Cemetery, Moston, Manchester.

Catholic Church titles
| Preceded by John Bilsborrow | Bishop of Salford; 1903–1925 | Succeeded by Thomas Henshaw |
Professional and academic associations
| Preceded by George H. Pownall | President of the Manchester Statistical Society; 1898–1900 | Succeeded by Alfred William Flux |
