= Philip Hughes (historian) =

English priest and historian (1895–1967)

Philip Hughes (11 May 1895 – 6 October 1967) was a Roman Catholic priest and Catholic ecclesiastical historian. He taught post-graduate courses at the University of Notre Dame.

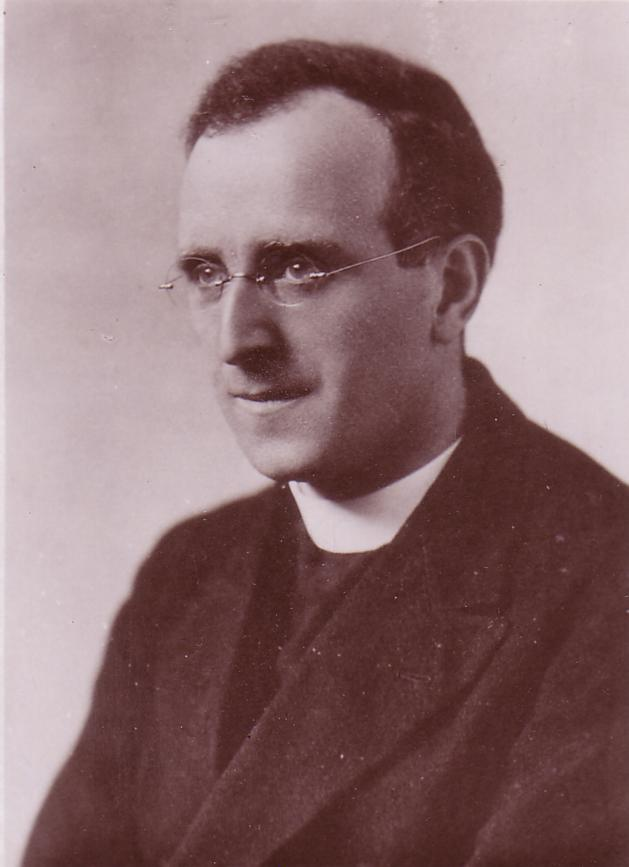
Monsignor Hughes

== Early life ==
Hughes was born in Gorton, Manchester, on 11 May 1895. He received his early education at St Augustine's RC School, Manchester prior to being admitted to St Bede's College, Manchester in September 1907, graduating at midsummer 1912. He then studied at St Cuthbert's College, Ushaw and Leeds Seminary, where he was ordained deacon on 16 June 1917, prior to continuing his studies at Louvain University where he received his degree in 1921. He was ordained as a priest in 1920.

== Career ==
After ordination Hughes spent three years in Rome, undertaking research. In 1923, he was appointed history professor at St Thomas College in Minnesota, United States. The following year he was recalled to the Diocese of Salford and began parish work as curate at Salford Cathedral, moving to St Chad's, Cheetham Hill in 1925, St Anne, Fairfield in 1929 and finally to St Thomas of Canterbury, Higher Broughton in 1930.

In 1931, Hughes moved to London, to lecture at the new Catholic Centre for Higher Studies, founded by Frank Sheed. In 1934 he was appointed archivist for the Archdiocese of Westminster. He remained in London until 1955 when he was offered a post as professor of reformation history at the University of Notre Dame. He was awarded the title of Monsignor in 1957.

Hughes died in America on 6 October 1967, at 72, and was buried in South Bend, Indiana, United States.

== Bibliography ==
- Hughes, Philip (1935–1947), A History of The Church: An Introductory Study, New York: Sheed and Ward (3 volumes)
  - Volume I: The Church And The World In Which The Church Was Founded
  - Volume II: The Church And The World The Church Created. Augustine To Aquinas
  - Volume III: The Revolt Against The Church. Aquinas To Luther.
  - Hughes did not complete a planned fourth volume before his death.
- Hughes, Philip (1949), A Popular History of the Catholic Church (20 printings), New York: Macmillan. [An abridgment of his three-volume series, but running up to the mid-twentieth century, and published concurrently.]
- Hughes, Philip (1929), The Catholic Question, 1688-1829: a Study in Political History, London: Sheed & Ward.
- Hughes, Philip (1961). The Church in Crisis: A History of the General Councils, 325-1870. Garden City, NY: Hanover House.
- Hughes, Philip (1976), A History of the Church to the Eve of the Reformation, London: Sheed & Ward.
- Hughes, Philip (3 volumes, 1950–1954), The Reformation in England, New York: Macmillan.
  - 1-vol. edition also available (1963), 8^{o}, bound in red cloth.
- Hughes, Philip (1935), "From St. Ignatius of Antioch to the Conversion of Constantine", in Cuthbert Lattey, ed., The Pre-Nicene Church: Papers Read at the Summer School of Catholic Studies, Held at Cambridge, July 28th to August 6th, 1934, London: Burns, Oates.
- Hall, Richard [supposed author] (1935), Philip Hughes, ed., Saint John Fisher: The Earliest English Life, London: Burns, Oates.
- Hughes, Philip (1937), Pope Pius the Eleventh, New York: Sheed & Ward.
- Hughes, Philip (1938), The Faith in Practice, New York: Longmans, Green.
- Hughes, Philip (1938), trans., Meditations for Lent from St. Thomas Aquinas, New York: Sheed & Ward.
- Hughes, Philip (1942), Rome and the Counter-Reformation in England, London: Burns, Oates.
- Hughes, Philip (1943), ed., The Popes' New Order: A Systematic Summary of the Social Encyclicals and Addresses, from Leo XIII to Pius XII, London: Burns, Oates.
- Hughes, Philip (1957), A Popular History of the Reformation, 1960 reprint, Garden City, NY: Image Books.
- Hughes, Philip (1965) The Catholic Faith in Practice, Wilkes-Barre, PA: Dimension Books.
- [A never-finished book in the series, "The Rise of Modern Europe", The Catholic Reformation, was replaced—O'Connell, Marvin (1974), The Counter Reformation, New York: Harper & Row.]
- Philip Hughes papers (Notre Dame)
