= Thomas Henshaw (bishop) =

English bishop

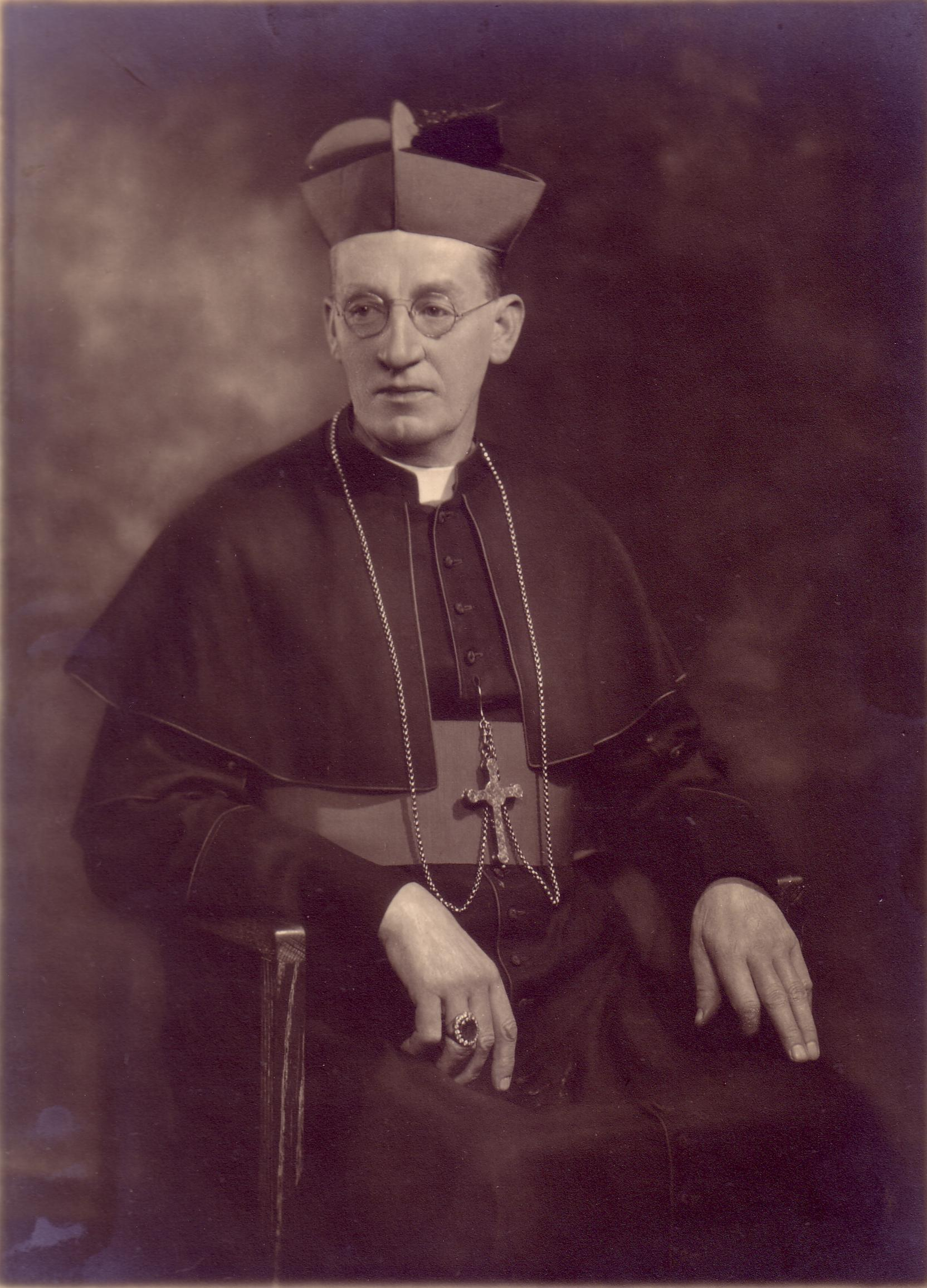
- Bishop of Salford 1925-1938
- Title: Bishop of Salford

Personal life
- Born: 2 February 1873 Manchester
- Died: 23 September 1938 (aged 65) Manchester

Religious life
- Religion: Roman Catholic
- Consecration: 21 December 1925

Senior posting
- Based in: Salford

Military service
- Rank: Bishop

Thomas Henshaw (1873–1938) was the fifth Bishop of Salford, a Roman Catholic diocese in the north-west of England.

== Early life and education ==
He was born on 2 February 1873 in Miles Platting in Manchester, the son of Thomas Henshaw, a Manchester coal merchant, and his wife Ann Billington. He was educated at the Salford Catholic Grammar School, the English College, Lisbon, and at St Cuthbert's College, Ushaw, where he taught French for three years as a Minor Professor.

== Early career ==
He was ordained as a priest on 18 October 1899. Following ordination, Henshaw was sent to the Institut Catholique in Paris, where he specialised for three years in Dogmatic Theology. He then spent a year at Bonn University in Germany, before taking the chair in Dogmatic Theology at Ushaw College in County Durham.

In 1905, Henshaw returned to his native Salford Diocese, serving for the next six years at St Bede's College as Professor and Vice-Rector. In 1912, he was appointed curate at St Alban, Blackburn until 1913, when he became Rector at the Holy Saviour, Nelson. In 1916, he moved to St Mary, Heaton Norris, and in 1920 took charge of St Gabriel, Castleton. In mid-1925 he was appointed parish priest at St Anne, Blackburn, where he completed the work building the new Byzantine church started by the previous priest, Fr William Shine, who had died suddenly earlier that year.

== As Bishop of Salford ==
Bishop Louis Charles Casartelli had died in January 1925, but it would be almost a year before a replacement was appointed. That replacement was Henshaw, consecrated Bishop on 21 December 1925 at Salford Cathedral by Archbishop Keating. He was taken as a "pastorally minded and pragmatic parish priest with financial acumen and quiet scholarship".

Education was Henshaw's forte, even if the vision of Catholic education in Westminster and in Salford occasionally clashed. Particular problems of physically defective "blacklisted" schools and of the beginning of slum clearance in inner urban areas, taxed the mind and pocket of the Catholic community. The 1936 Education Act separated schools into Junior and Senior Schools and ended, at least in theory, the all-age parish elementary school.

The lay organisations continued to develop, with newcomers such as the Legion of Mary and the Young Christian Workers. Henshaw's attitude to the continual shortage of priests was simple: pray and the Lord will provide.

In 1926 the diocese also hosted the National Catholic Congress in Manchester. In 1927 he acquired the Wardley Hall Estate in Worsley as the official residence of the Bishop of Salford.

He died on 23 September 1938, aged 65.

== Legacy ==
The first Catholic senior school to be built in Rochdale was founded in 1968 and named Bishop Henshaw School, It was a secondary High School with a Sixth Form. At the retirement of its only Headmaster Frank Kelly 1989 it was renamed St Cuthbert's RC High School following the Diocese of Salford's decision to scrap the three-tier system.

Catholic Church titles
Preceded by Louis Charles Casartelli	Bishop of Salford; 1925–1938	Succeeded by Henry Vincent Marshall
