= Geoffrey Burke =

English Roman Catholic bishop

The Right Reverend Geoffrey Ignatius Burke
- Auxiliary Bishop of Salford
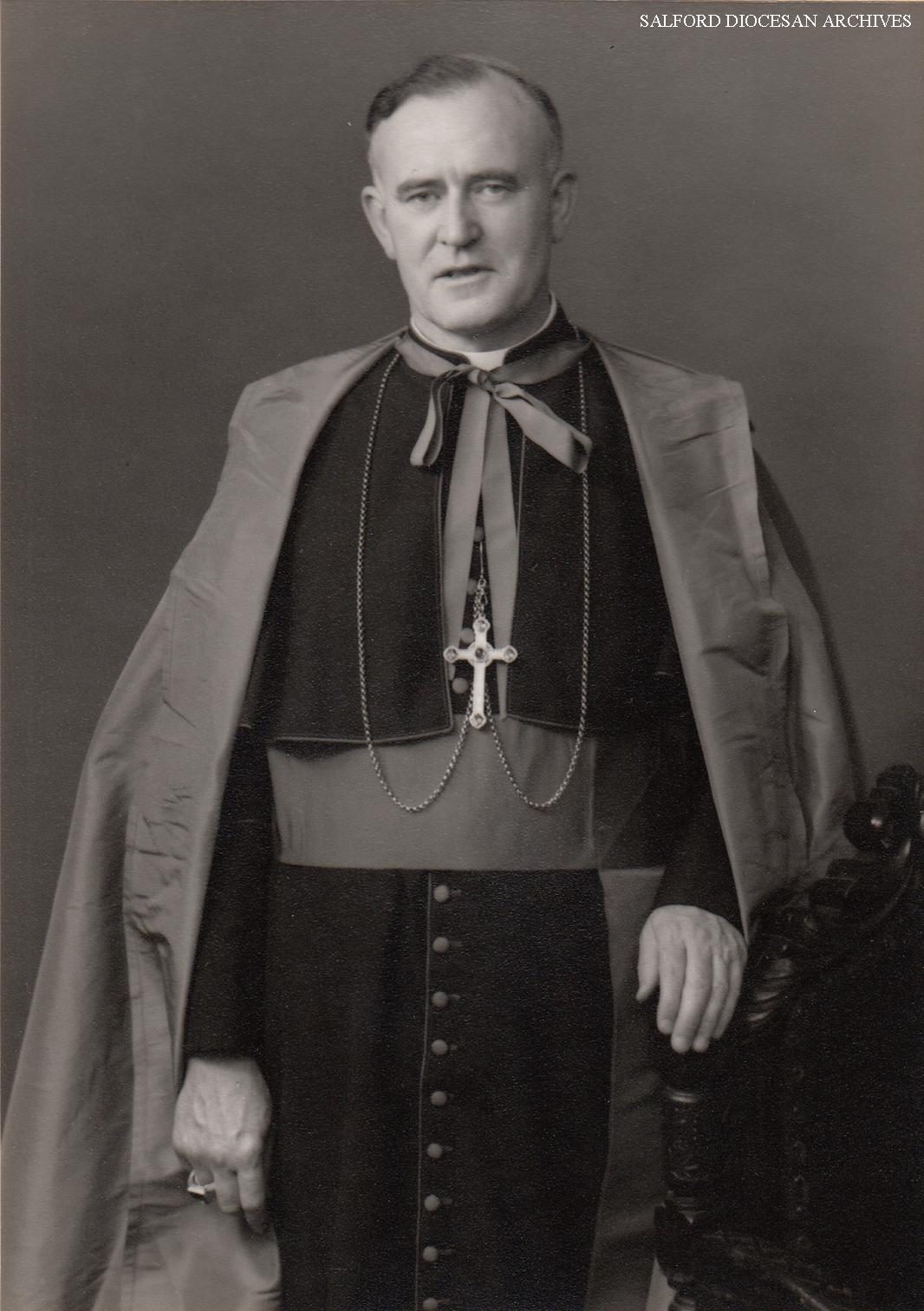
- Bishop Burke
- Diocese: Salford
- Appointed: 1967
- Term ended: 12 September 1988
- Other post: Titular Bishop of Vagrauta

Orders
- Ordination: 29 June 1937 by Thomas Leighton Williams
- Consecration: 29 June 1967 by Thomas Holland

Personal details
- Born: Geoffrey Ignatius Burke; 31 July 1913 Whalley Range, Lancashire, England
- Died: 13 October 1999 (aged 86) Longsight, Lancashire, England
- Denomination: Roman Catholic Church
- Parents: Peter and Margaret Mary Burke

Bishop Geoffrey Ignatius Burke MA (31 July 1913 – 13 October 1999) was an English Roman Catholic bishop.

== Early life ==
Geoffrey Burke was born in Whalley Range, Manchester, in 1913, the son of Doctor Peter Burke and his wife Margaret Mary. He was one of seven children and his elder brother Donatus also became a Priest of the Salford Diocese, he was educated at St Bede's College, Manchester, from 1924 and Stonyhurst College from 1928. He studied for the Priesthood at Oscott College where he was ordained on 29 June 1937 by Archbishop Thomas Leighton Williams. He then went to Downing College, Cambridge, where he gained his MA in 1940.

== Career ==
Returning to the Salford Diocese in 1940, Fr Burke was appointed as Professor at St Bede's College, becoming Prefect of Studies in 1950 and Vice-Rector in 1953. At St Bede's he taught Ian Kershaw who later said Burke was "a marvellous teacher and I owe him a lot". In 1966 following the retirement of Monsignor Thomas Duggan through ill health, Burke was appointed Rector of the college but only remained in the post for a year before being appointed Auxiliary Bishop of Salford by Pope Paul VI in 1967 to assist Bishop Thomas Holland. He took the title of Titular Bishop of Vagrauta, being consecrated in Salford Cathedral on 29 June 1967 by Bishop Holland. He then took up residence at Salford Cathedral House.

== Later life ==
Bishop Burke continued in his role of Auxiliary Bishop following Bishop Holland's retirement and during the early years of Bishop (later Archbishop) Patrick Kelly's time as Bishop of Salford. Pope John Paul II accepted Bishop Burke's retirement on 12 September 1988. Bishop Burke took up residence at Nazareth House, Prestwich, and then later at the Little Sisters of the Poor in Longsight, where he died on 13 October 1999, aged 86.
