= William Turner (bishop of Salford) =

English Roman Catholic prelate

The Right Reverend William Turner, D.D.
- Bishop of Salford
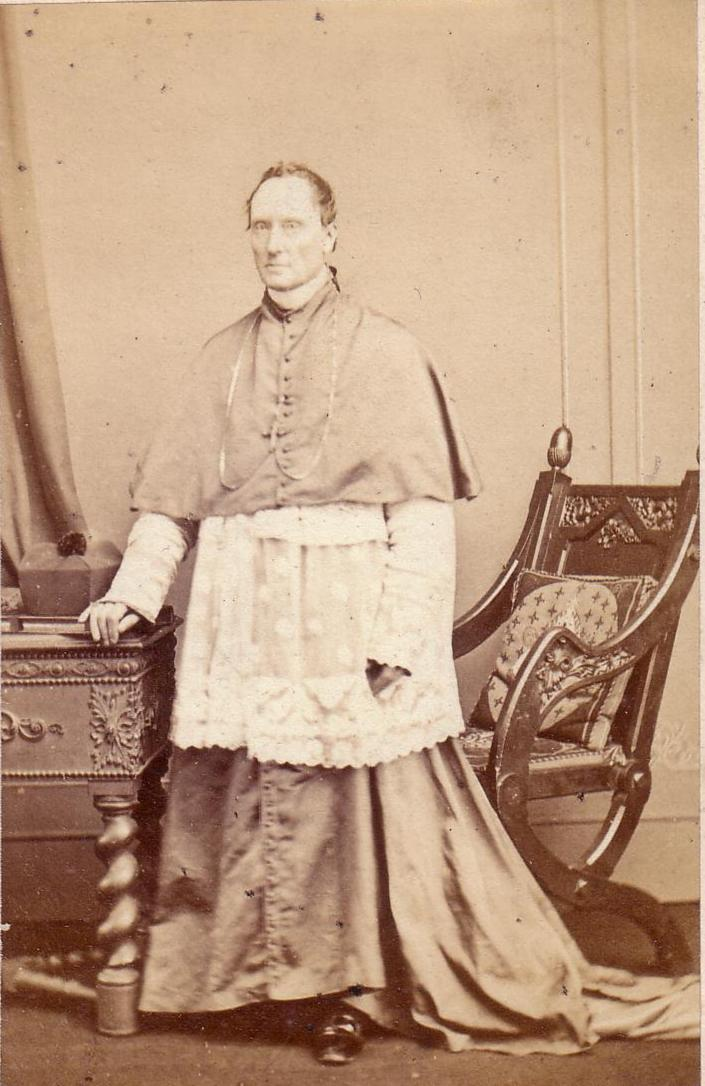
- Diocese: Salford
- Appointed: 27 June 1851
- Term ended: 13 July 1872
- Successor: Herbert Vaughan

Orders
- Ordination: 17 December 1825 (priest)
- Consecration: 25 July 1851 (bishop) by Nicholas Wiseman

Personal details
- Born: 25 September 1799 Whittingham, Lancashire, England
- Died: 13 July 1872 (aged 72) Salford, Lancashire, England
- Denomination: Roman Catholic
- Education: St Cuthbert's College, Ushaw; English College, Rome

William Turner (1799–1872) was an English Roman Catholic prelate who served as the first Bishop of Salford from 1851 to 1872. After his ordination to the priesthood, he served in the poorer parishes of central Manchester, and was appointed Vicar General for the Lancashire District.

== Early life and ministry ==
William Turner was born in Whittingham, near Preston, Lancashire on 25 September 1799. He began training for the priesthood at St Cuthbert's College, Ushaw in County Durham on 2 September 1815. After five years he left Ushaw and entered the English College, Rome on 3 November 1820 to continue his studies. While at Rome, he was ordained a subdeacon on 13 March 1824, a deacon on 18 December 1824, and a priest on 17 December 1825. He left Rome on 9 October 1826 to serve in the poor parishes in central Manchester. During that period, he became Vicar General to Dr George Brown, Vicar Apostolic of the Lancashire District. He served as Rector at St Chad's, Rook Street 1835-1842 and St Augustine's, Granby Row 1842-1853.

== Episcopal career ==
He was appointed the first Bishop of the Diocese of Salford by the Holy See on 27 June 1851. His episcopal ordination took place at Salford Cathedral on 25 July 1851, the principal consecrator was Cardinal Nicholas Wiseman, Archbishop of Westminster, and the principal co-consecrators were Bishop William Bernard Ullathorne of Birmingham and Bishop William Wareing of Northampton.

As the new bishop, Turner had to manage the influx of hundreds of Irish, who had fled the potato famines - increasing the Catholic population quite considerably. This problem was added to by the deaths of a tenth of the priests of the Diocese from fever contracted while tending to the sick. Many volunteer priests came from around the world to help, but the deaths of so many put a huge strain on the Bishop and his diocese. These problems were followed by the Cotton Famine, which caused even more strain.

Nevertheless, Turner was able to create the basis of the network of parishes and schools. Two religious congregations, the Sisters of the Cross and Passion and the Franciscan Missionaries of St Joseph (the Rescue Nuns) were also founded in the diocese during this time.

Bishop Turner attended the First Vatican Council as one of the 693 council fathers, held between 8 December 1869 to 20 October 1870.

He died in office at Salford on 13 July 1872, aged 72, and was succeeded by Herbert Vaughan. Bishop Turner's great-nephew, Fr Frederick Turner, SJ, was headmaster of Stonyhurst College.

== Bibliography ==
- Brady, W. Maziere (1876). The Episcopal Succession in England, Scotland and Ireland, A.D. 1400 to 1875. Vol. 3. Rome: Tipografia Della Pace.

Catholic Church titles
New title	Bishop of Salford; 1851–1872	Succeeded by Herbert Vaughan
