= Terence Brain =

English bishop

The Right Reverend Terence Brain
- Bishop Emeritus of Salford
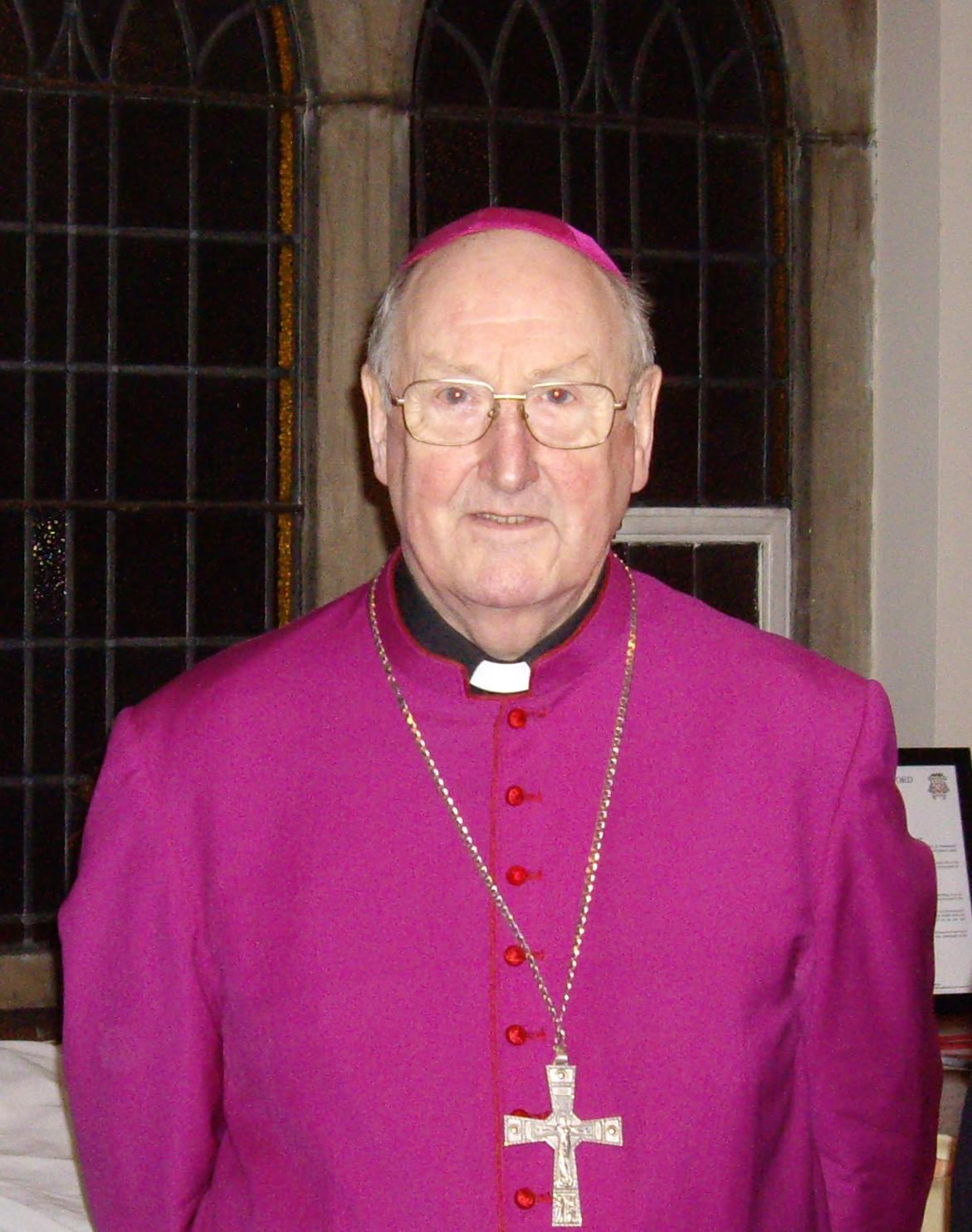
- Bishop Terence Brain
- Church: Roman Catholic Church
- Province: Liverpool
- Diocese: Salford
- Appointed: 2 September 1997
- Installed: 7 October 1997
- Term ended: 30 September 2014
- Predecessor: Patrick Altham Kelly
- Successor: John Arnold
- Previous posts: Auxiliary Bishop of Birmingham (1991-1997); Titular Bishop of Amudarsa (1991-1997)

Orders
- Ordination: 22 February 1964 by Francis Joseph Grimshaw
- Consecration: 25 April 1991 by Maurice Noël Léon Couve de Murville

Personal details
- Born: Terence John Brain; 19 December 1938 (age 87) Coventry, England
- Denomination: Roman Catholic

Terence Brain (born 19 December 1938 in Coventry, England) is the Bishop Emeritus of the Roman Catholic Diocese of Salford.

== Education ==
Bishop Brain attended King Henry VIII Grammar School and Cotton College before training for the priesthood at Oscott College, Sutton Coldfield. He was ordained as a priest by Archbishop Grimshaw in St Chad's Cathedral, Birmingham, on 22 February 1964.

== Priestly and episcopal career ==
In 1964 he was appointed as an assistant priest in Longton, Staffordshire, but after a year he returned to Cotton College and remained there for four years. After that he worked at Dudley Road Hospital in Birmingham as the hospital's chaplain for two years and later went on to serve as secretary to Archbishop George Dwyer (until he retired) and then to Archbishop Maurice Noël Léon Couve de Murville.

He became the priest to a series of parishes in the west Midlands area, including Bucknall, Stoke-on-Trent and Stafford. On 5 February 1991, he was consecrated as Auxiliary Bishop of Birmingham and appointed Titular Bishop of Amudarsa.

He was appointed as the Bishop of Salford and head of the Roman Catholic Diocese of Salford on 2 September 1997 and installed on 7 October of that year.

Bishop Brain resigned on Tuesday, 30 September 2014. That same day, the Pope appointed Bishop John Arnold as Bishop Brain's successor. Bishop Brain then retired to live in Alkrington.

== Other work ==
Terence Brain has been heavily involved with education and from 1986 to 1991 he was a member of Staffordshire Education Committee and Schools Commissioner for Staffordshire. He has been much involved with the Diocesan Lourdes Pilgrimage and has served as the director for a number of years. In 1995 he chaired a working party for the Bishop's Conference on child abuse which led to the pastoral document "Healing the Wound".

Catholic Church titles
Preceded by Patrick Kelly	Bishop of Salford; 1997-2014	Succeeded by John Arnold
