= Henry Marshall (bishop of Salford) =

UK Catholic Bishop (1884–1955)

The Right Reverend Henry Vincent Marshall
- Bishop of Salford
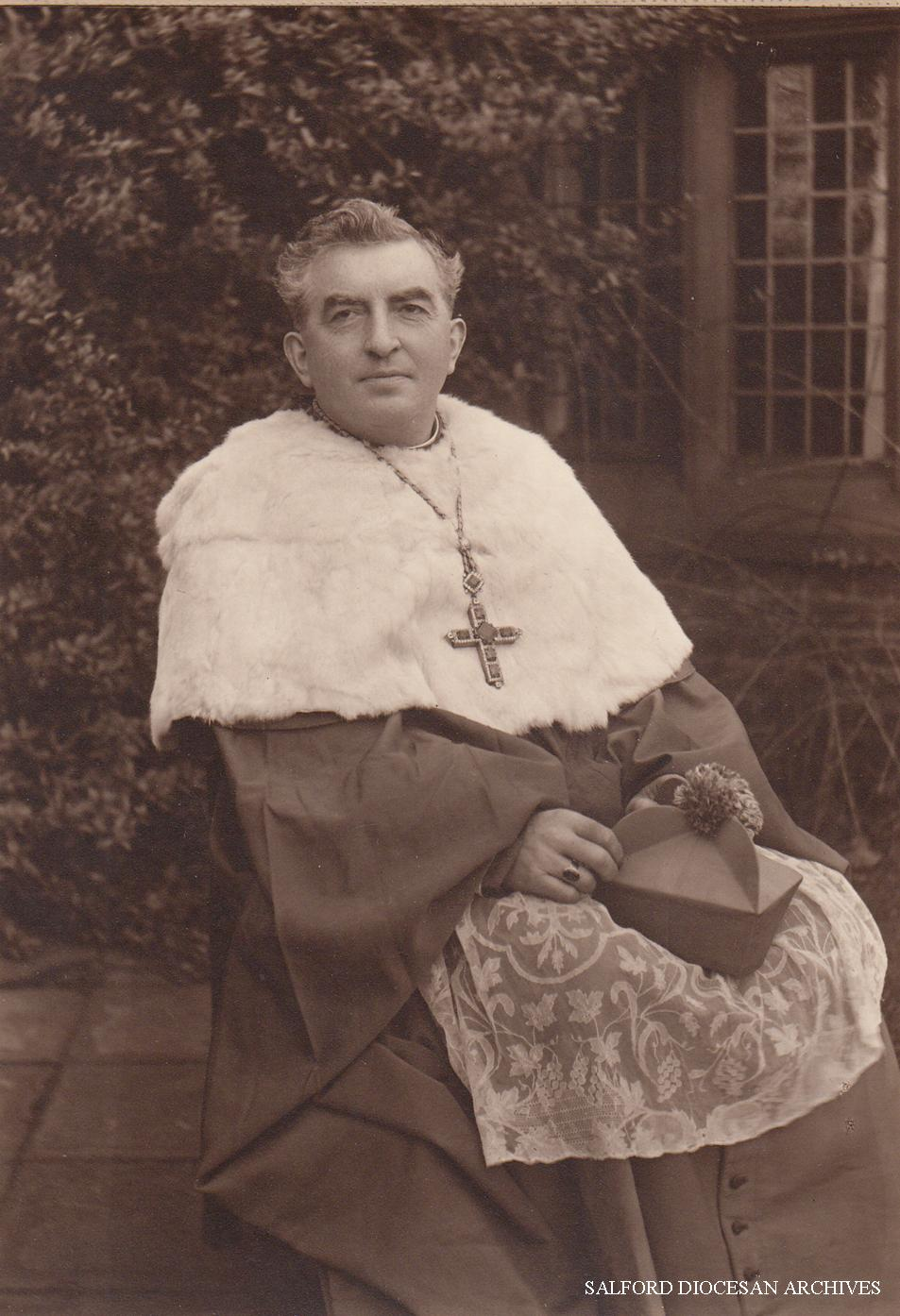
- Diocese: Salford
- Appointed: 5 August 1939
- Term ended: 14 April 1955
- Predecessor: Thomas Henshaw
- Successor: George Andrew Beck

Orders
- Ordination: 24 June 1908
- Consecration: 21 September 1939 by Archbishop Downey

Personal details
- Born: 19 July 1884 Listowel, County Kerry, Ireland
- Died: 14 April 1955 (aged 70) Salford, England
- Buried: St Joseph's Cemetery, Moston, Manchester, England
- Denomination: Roman Catholic
- Education: All Hallows College, Dublin

Henry Vincent Marshall (19 July 1884 – 14 April 1955) was the sixth Bishop of Salford, a Roman Catholic diocese in the north-west of England.

Born in 1884 in Listowel, County Kerry, Ireland he was educated there at St Michael's College and in Dublin at All Hallows College, where he was ordained a priest on 24 June 1908. of the Diocese of Salford.

Following ordination he served as curate at St Wilfrid, Hulme until 1910, when he was loaned to the Diocese of Newport. Returning to the Salford Diocese in 1911, he was appointed to St Thomas of Canterbury, Higher Broughton, where he remained until 1922, when he was appointed to Collyhurst, tasked with founding the new parish of St Malachy. In 1934 he was appointed Parish Priest at St Wilfrid, Longridge and then in 1935 at St Anne's Church, Ancoats.

In 1935, Marshall was made Vicar General of the Diocese and in 1937 was elevated to the Cathedral Chapter. Upon the death of Bishop Thomas Henshaw, he was appointed as Vicar Capitular and on 5 August 1939 was appointed as the new bishop, being consecrated on 21 September 1939 on the eve of the Second World War.

This was a difficult time for the Bishop and his diocese, with mobilisation, conscription, evacuation, war work, war-time shortages and the Blitz placing grave pressures on families and parishes. Several churches and schools were bombed. Marshall was privately opposed to further evacuations of Catholic children to areas where they would not be near the Catholic Church, arguing that he would "rather see children killed than that they should lose their precious gift of faith, purity, and piety", even though 347 children aged under five were killed in the bombing raids.

In 1944, the Education Act radically changed the school situation, and placed immense financial burdens on Catholics who wished to keep their schools. Marshall created a "School Emergency Fund" which still levies parishes today.

Post war slum clearance and the creation of overspill estates added to his burdens. However, new parishes and schools, primary and secondary, were opened.

In 1954 the diocese was legally registered as a charity. Such was the bishop's leadership and grasp of detail that the diocese was humorously described as being under "Martial Law".

Marshall died on 14 April 1955, age 70.

Preceded by Thomas Henshaw	Bishop of Salford; 1939–1955	Succeeded by George Andrew Beck
