= Bishop of Salford =

Catholic ecclesial title in England

- Bishopric

catholic
- Incumbent: John Arnold

Location
- Ecclesiastical province: Liverpool

Information
- First holder: William Turner
- Established: 1850
- Diocese: Salford
- Cathedral: St. John the Evangelist, Salford

The Bishop of Salford is the ordinary of the Catholic Diocese of Salford in the Province of Liverpool, England.

With the gradual abolition of the legal restrictions on the activities of Catholics in England and Wales in the early 19th century, Rome decided to proceed to bridge the gap of the centuries from Queen Elizabeth I by instituting Catholic dioceses on the regular historical pattern. On 29 September 1850, Pope Pius IX issued the Bull Universalis Ecclesiae which created thirteen new dioceses which did not formally claim any continuity with the pre-Elizabethan English dioceses of which one of these was the diocese of Salford and went on to take up the reins of part of the former Vicariate Apostolic of the Lancashire District.

In the early period from 1850 the diocese was a suffragan of the Metropolitan See of Westminster, but a further development was its assignment under Pope Pius X, on 28 October 1911, to a newly created province of Liverpool.

At the diocese's creation the territory assigned to it was the hundreds of Salford and Blackburn. The diocese currently covers an area of 1,600 km^{2} (600 sq mi) and consists of a large part of Greater Manchester and adjacent parts of Lancashire.

The see is in the Salford area of Greater Manchester, where the Bishop's cathedra or seat is located in the Salford Cathedral, which was dedicated on 14 June 1890.

The Bishop's residence is Wardley Hall, Worsley, Greater Manchester.

The current bishop is John Arnold, formerly an Auxiliary Bishop of the Archdiocese of Westminster. He was appointed by Pope Francis to succeed Terence Brain as the 11th Bishop of Salford on 30 September 2014 and was installed on 8 December 2014.

== List of bishops ==
=== Diocesan bishops of Salford ===
Diocesan Bishops of Salford
From	Until	Incumbent	Notes
1851	1872	William Turner	Appointed bishop on 27 June 1851 and consecrated on 25 July 1851. Died in office on 13 July 1872.
1872	1892	Herbert Vaughan	Appointed bishop on 27 September 1872 and consecrated on 28 October 1872. Translated to the archbishopric of Westminster on 8 April 1892.
1892	1903	John Bilsborrow	Appointed bishop on 15 July 1892 and consecrated on 24 August 1892. Died in office on 5 March 1903.
1903	1925	Louis Charles Casartelli	Appointed bishop on 28 August 1903 and consecrated on 21 September 1903. Died in office on 18 January 1925.
1925	1938	Thomas Henshaw	Appointed bishop on 14 December 1925 and consecrated on 21 December 1925. Died in office on 23 September 1938.
1939	1955	Henry Vincent Marshall	Appointed bishop on 5 August 1939 and consecrated on 21 September 1939. Died in office on 14 April 1955.
1955	1964	George Andrew Beck, A.A.	Previously Bishop of Brentwood (1951–1955). Appointed Bishop of Salford on 28 November 1955. Translated to the archbishopric of Liverpool on 29 January 1964.
1964	1983	Thomas Holland	Formerly coadjutor bishop of Portsmouth (1960–1964). Appointed Bishop of Salford on 28 August 1964. Retired on 22 June 1983 and died on 30 September 1999.
1984	1996	Patrick Altham Kelly	Appointed bishop on 9 March 1984 and consecrated on 3 April 1984. Translated to the archbishopric of Liverpool on 21 May 1996.
1997	2014	Terence John Brain	Formerly an auxiliary bishop of Birmingham (1991–1997). Appointed Bishop of Salford on 2 September 1997.
2014	present	John Stanley Kenneth Arnold	Auxiliary Bishop of the Archdiocese of Westminster since 2005. Appointed Bishop of Salford on 30 September 2014.

=== Auxiliary bishops of Salford ===
There have been two auxiliary bishops of the Diocese of Salford who assisted the diocesan bishop of Salford in overseeing the diocese:

- John Stephen Vaughan, appointed on 13 July 1909 and consecrated on 15 August 1909; died in office on 4 December 1925.
- Geoffrey Burke, appointed on 26 May 1967 and consecrated on 29 June 1967; retired on 12 September 1988 and died on 13 October 1999.

== See also ==
- Diocese of Salford churches
