= Brownedge St Mary's Catholic High School =

Location
- Station Road; Bamber Bridge; Lancashire, PR5 6PB; England
- Coordinates: 53.73269°N 2.66161°W

Information
- Type: Voluntary aided school
- Religious affiliation: Roman Catholic
- Local authority: Lancashire
- Department for Education URN: 119784 Tables
- Ofsted: Reports
- Headteacher: Nicola Oddie
- Gender: Coeducational
- Age: 11 to 16
- Enrolment: 758 as of December 2022
- Website: http://www.st-maryshigh.lancs.sch.uk/

Brownedge St Mary's Catholic High School is a coeducational secondary school located in Bamber Bridge in the English county of Lancashire. It is a voluntary aided school administered by Lancashire County Council and the Roman Catholic Diocese of Salford. The school offers GCSEs and vocational courses as programmes of study for pupils, with vocational courses offered in conjunction with local partner colleges.
