= St Cecilia's Roman Catholic High School =

St Cecilia's RC High School
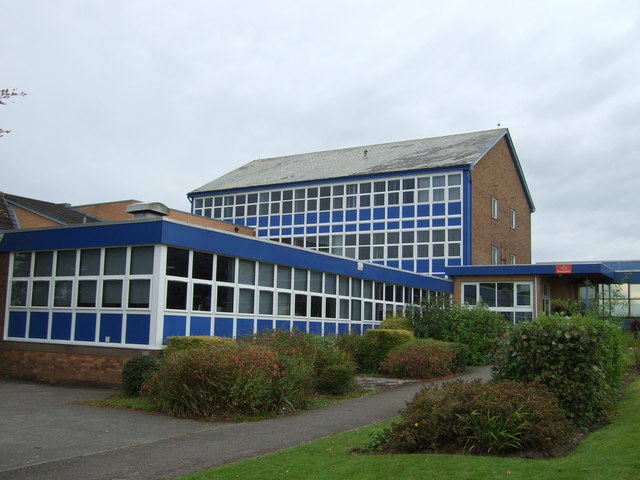

Location
- Chapel Hill; Longridge; Lancashire, PR3 2XA; England
- Coordinates: 53.82478°N 2.60531°W

Information
- Type: Voluntary aided school
- Religious affiliation: Roman Catholic
- Local authority: Lancashire
- Department for Education URN: 119800 Tables
- Ofsted: Reports
- Head teacher: Helen Hall
- Gender: Coeducational
- Age: 11 to 16
- Website: https://st-cecilias.co.uk/

St Cecilia's Roman Catholic High School is a coeducational secondary school in Longridge in the English county of Lancashire. The school is named after Saint Cecilia, the patroness of musicians. It is a voluntary aided school which is administered by Lancashire County Council and the Roman Catholic Diocese of Salford. St Cecilia's offers GCSEs and BTECs as programmes of study for pupils.

The current headteacher is Helen Hall, who was permanently appointed to the post in 2021 after serving as acting headteacher for four months.

The school was assessed as "good" by Ofsted in 2016 and again in 2019. The previous report, in 2013, said the school "required improvement" and the subsequent progression report in 2014 praised the school for taking effective action to take the school out of special measures.

The school gates were painted gold in 2017 in honour of Paralympian Stephanie Slater MBE, who had attended the school.
