= St Bede's College, Manchester =

School in Manchester, England

St Bede's College

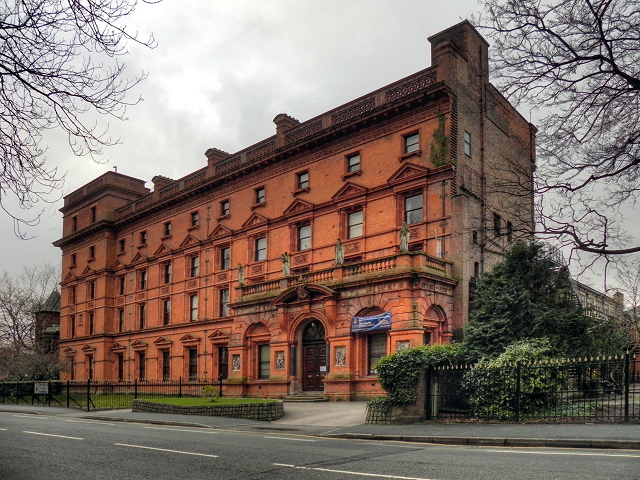

Location
- Alexandra Park; Manchester, M16 8HX; England
- 53.4515°N 2.2526°W

Information
- Type: Private day school Public School
- Motto: Latin: Nunquam Otio Torpebat ("He never relaxed in idleness")
- Religious affiliation: Roman Catholic
- Established: 1876
- Founder: Cardinal Herbert Vaughan
- Sister school: Blackrock College
- Chair of Trustees: Xavier Bosch
- Headteacher: María Kemp
- Gender: Co-educational
- Age: 3 to 18
- Enrollment: 700~
- Houses: Siena, Bosco, Campion and Magdalene (formerly St. Alban, St. Chad, St. Cuthbert, St. Wilfred)
- Colours: Blue and gold
- Publication: Baeda
- Former pupils: Old Bedians
- Website: Official website

St Bede's College is an Independent Roman Catholic co-educational day school for pupils between 3 and 18 years located on Alexandra Road South in Whalley Range, Manchester, England. It is a member of the Headmasters' and Headmistresses' Conference.

Originally founded in 1876 in All Saints, Manchester as a Commercial College by the Bishop of Salford, Herbert Vaughan, the College moved to its present site on Alexandra Park Road in 1877 and in 1891 became the Diocesan Junior Seminary. The College is no longer operated by the Diocese of Salford and is today an independent charitable trust run by a board of trustees.

== History ==
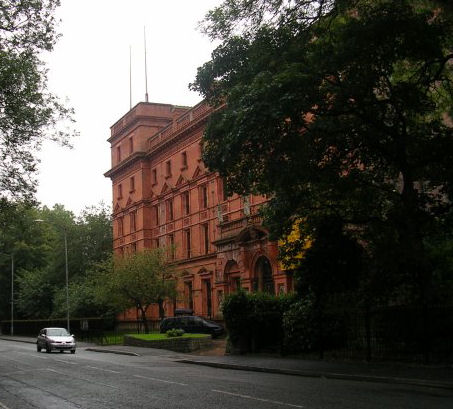
The Vaughan building from Alexandra Road South

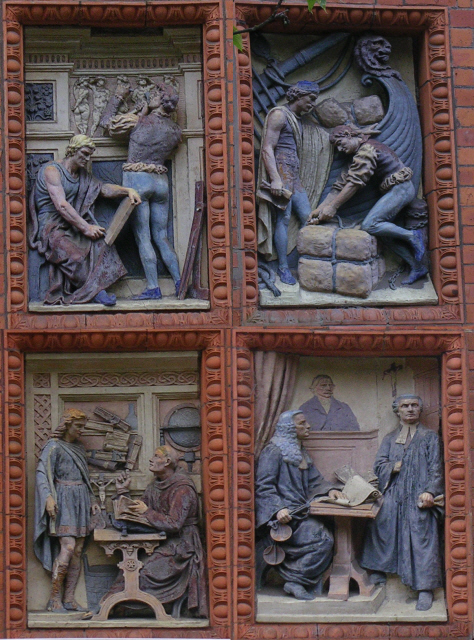
Details from four relief panels by Tinworth and Doulton near the main entrance, Vaughan building

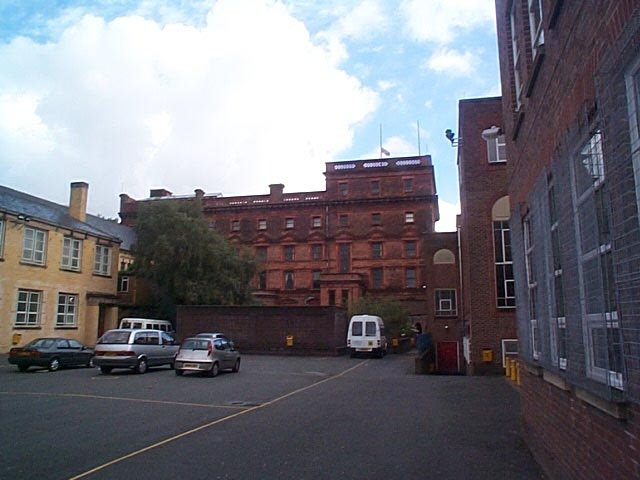
Part of the main playground. In the background is the Vaughan building, with the Beck building to the right.

The original school was at 16 Devonshire Street, Grosvenor Square, off Oxford Road (then called Oxford Street) and was set up in 1876 by the then Bishop of Salford, Herbert Vaughan, later Cardinal Archbishop of Westminster. Originally, the school was conceived as a "commercial school" to prepare the sons of Manchester Catholics for a life in business and the professions.

This was the first school under the patronage of Saint Bede. In August 1877, the Manchester Aquarium on Alexandra Road South and the plot of land around it was purchased by the then Bishop Vaughan for College purposes. On 10 September 1877, St Bede's College re-opened in the Manchester Aquarium with 45 pupils who were taught by 11 staff, 8 of them priests. The faculty lived in 'Rose Lawn', until the accommodation levels were completed in the Vaughan Building, for both clergy and a large number of boarders. The somewhat spartan conditions were alleviated by a team of long-serving nuns, who took care of the domestic and catering requirements, as well as a number of lay staff.

In the late 1870s and early 1880s, the Vaughan building was constructed (see pictures). The original plan was for a symmetrical building, with five-storey towers at each end. Only one half of this design was ever carried out, but the main ground floor corridor of the Vaughan building is an impressive centrepiece for the school all the same. An imposing entrance on Alexandra Road (decorated with ceramic mouldings by Tinworth) leads into a corridor adorned with mosaics and marble. The original aquarium building (now the school's Academic Hall) leads off the main corridor directly opposite the main entrance. Appropriately the decorative scheme includes plaster mouldings of fish and other marine animals.

In 1891, Salford Catholic Grammar School (the Diocesan Junior seminary) amalgamated with the College which duly became the place where over 500 priests, some of whom later became bishops or archbishops, were educated.

The College Chapel was built in 1898 and the Henshaw Building, named after the fifth Bishop of Salford, was opened around 1932. The Beck Building, named after the seventh Bishop of Salford George Andrew Beck, was opened in 1958 while the St Regis Building, built in the first decade of the 20th century as a retreat house for the Cenacle Convent, was bought by the College in 1970. It remained empty until 1984 when the Governors took the decision to make St Bede's co-educational. Over the next three years, the St Regis building was completely renovated and allowed the College roll to increase from 630 at the beginning of the 1980s to just under 1000 today.

Between 1886 and 1896, the College had an affiliate school [a 'realgymnasium'] at Bonn, Germany, then a small town on the Rhine. It was never successful. British victims of the war are commemorated in the College Chapel.

From the time of the school's move to Alexandra Road, the College supported the nearby St Bede's Mission, and priests on the school's staff worked to provide for the spiritual needs of the Catholic population in Whalley Range. In 1893 the Bishop of Salford, John Bilsborrow, appointed Father James Rowan, a former teacher at the college, as priest in charge of the district. The new English Martyrs Parish Church was consecrated on the Feast of the English Martyrs, 4 May 1922.

== Today ==
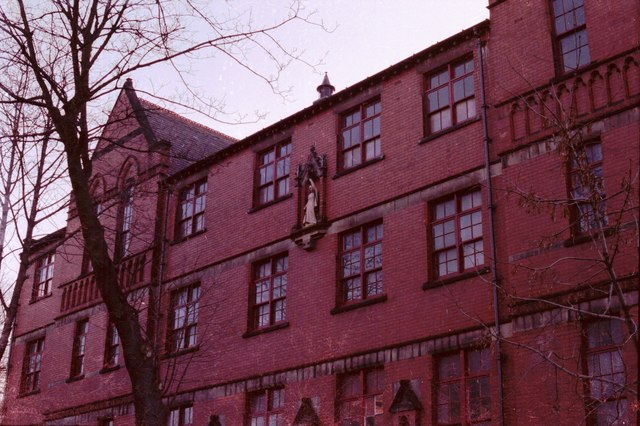
St Regis Building, Wellington Road

The school admits children from Roman Catholic and non-Catholic families. Pupils performed well at GCSE and A-level in 2006.

Members of the Manchester City Academy attend as part of the Premier League’s Full Time Training Model, funded by the club.

== School publications ==
Baeda is the school's annual publication and reviews the academic, sporting and other events within the school. It was first published at Michaelmas 1896. It chronicles the achievements of pupils and publishes works of arts, poetry and prose, as well as tales from ex-pupils. Although the editor is a member of staff, it is largely contributed to by pupils. Its name is the school's patron saint's name in Latin.

== Notable alumni ==
Alumni of the school, led by the games master and former Sale player Des Pastore MBE, founded the Old Bedians Rugby union Football Club in Chorltonville in 1954.

Musicians

- Clint Boon (b. 1959), musician, DJ and radio presenter
- Arthur Catterall (1883–1943), classical musician
- Rob Gretton (1953–1999), manager of Joy Division and New Order
- Mike Harding (b. 1944), folk singer and DJ
- Stephen Hough (b. 1961), concert pianist
- Nicholas Kenyon (b. 1951), BBC Proms controller
- John Maher (b. 1960), drummer, Buzzcocks
- Peter Noone (b. 1947), singer, Herman's Hermits

Actors, television personalities, writers and journalists

- Colin Baker (b. 1943), actor, the Sixth Doctor in Doctor Who
- Terry Christian (b. 1960), radio and TV presenter
- Ed Docx (b. 1972), writer and broadcaster
- Trevor Griffiths (1935–2024), dramatist
- Toby Harnden (b. 1966), journalist and writer
- Ceallach Spellman (b. 1995), actor, Waterloo Road
- Reece Douglas (b. 1994), actor, Waterloo Road
- Nina Warhurst (b. 1980), journalist and broadcaster, BBC Breakfast

Clergy

- Geoffrey Burke (1913–1999), Auxiliary Bishop of Salford (1967–1988)
- Robert Byrne (b. 1956), Auxiliary Bishop of Birmingham (2014–2019)
- George Patrick Dwyer (1908–1987), Archbishop of Birmingham
- Thomas McMahon (b. 1936), Bishop of Brentwood (1980–2014)
- John Francis McNulty (1879–1943), Bishop of Nottingham (1932–1943)
- Joseph Masterson (1899–1953), Archbishop of Birmingham (1947–1953)
- Philip Pargeter (b. 1933), Titular Bishop of Valentiniana and retired Auxiliary Bishop in the Archdiocese of Birmingham (1989–2009)
- Thomas Leo Parker (1887–1975), Bishop of Northampton (1940–1967)
- Joseph Edward Rudderham (1899–1979), Bishop of Clifton (1949–1974)
- Phillip Hughes (1895–1967), priest and Catholic ecclesiastical historian

Politics and Business

- Sir William Patrick Byrne (1859–1935), Senior Civil Servant
- Professor John Clancy, former Leader, Birmingham City Council
- John P. Connolly (b. 1950), businessman
- Paul Goggins (1953–2014), MP for Wythenshawe and Sale East
- José Gutiérrez Guerra (1869–1929), President of Bolivia (1917–1920)
- Sir Edward Hulton, 1st Baronet (1869–1925), newspaper magnate and racehorse breeder
- Derek Page, Baron Whaddon (1927–2005), MP for King's Lynn
- Steven Woolfe (b. 1967), barrister, writer, commentator and former politician

Sportspersons

- Phil Foden (b. 2000), Manchester City footballer
- Angus Gunn (b. 1996), Norwich City footballer
- Jimmy Hogan (1882–1974), footballer and coach
- Will Keane (b. 1993), Preston North End and Republic of Ireland footballer
- Michael Keane (b. 1993), Everton and England footballer
- Neil Mellor (b. 1982), broadcaster and retired footballer
- Mike Milligan (b. 1967), coach and former footballer
- Cole Palmer (b. 2002), Chelsea and England footballer
- Martin Samuelsen (b. 1997), West Ham United footballer
- Jadon Sancho (b. 2000), Manchester United footballer
- Georgia Stanway (b. 1999), Manchester City, Bayern Munich and England footballer
- Andrew Steele (b. 1984), athlete
- James Trafford (b. 2002), Manchester City, Bolton Wanderers and Burnley footballer
- Keira Walsh (b. 1997), Manchester City, Barcelona and England footballer
- Rob Woolley (b. 1990), former first-class cricketer

Miscellaneous

- Major General Joseph Baillon (1895–1951), senior British Army officer
- Lord John Carmont (1880–1965), senior Scottish High Court Judge
- Robert Churchhouse (1927–2018), mathematician
- Sir Ian Kershaw (b. 1943), historian
- Sir John Lyons (1932–2020), linguist and semanticist, Master of Trinity Hall Cambridge
- Steve McGarry (b. 1953), cartoonist, President of National Cartoonists Society
- Bernard O'Donoghue (b. 1945), contemporary Irish poet and academic

== Reports of abuse ==
The College found itself involved in two separate historic abuse investigations; in 2008, a former teacher Father William Green was charged with various counts of indecent assault and indecency with pupils at the school in the 1970s and 1980s. He admitted the offences and was jailed, but has since been released and has now died. The diocese said that it had co-operated with the police and that safeguards against this happening again had long been in place. Then in 2011 the Manchester Evening News published an article concerning Monsignor Thomas Duggan, who had been Rector at the college during the 1950s and 1960s. It alleged mental, physical and sexual abuse of pupils at the college at that time. An attempt was later made by 57 old boys to bring a private prosecution against the school, but the plaintiffs eventually withdrew the case.

== See also ==
- Listed buildings in Manchester-M16
- Catholic sex abuse cases
- For more information about St. Bede's buildings and other developments see Whalley Range.
