= Robert Churchhouse =

British mathematician

Robert Francis Churchhouse CBE KSG
- Churchhouse displaying an Enigma machine
- Born: 30 December 1927; Higher Blackley, Manchester, England
- Died: 27 August 2018 (aged 90)

Academic work
- Discipline: Mathematician
- Sub-discipline: Cryptography, Number theory
- Institutions: Government Communications Headquarters, Atlas Computer Laboratory, Institute of Mathematics and its Applications, Cardiff University
- Notable works: Codes and Ciphers: Julius Caesar, the Enigma and the Internet. (2002)

Robert Francis Churchhouse CBE KSG, also known as Bob Churchhouse (30 December 1927 – 27 August 2018) was Professor of Computing Mathematics at Cardiff University and President of the Institute of Mathematics and its Applications.

== Early life and education ==
Churchhouse was born on 30 December 1927 in Higher Blackley, Manchester. The son of Robert Francis, a laboratory assistant, and Agnes Churchhouse (née Howard), a cotton mill worker. Churchhouse grew up into a Roman Catholic family. He attended St Clare's RC Primary School, and then St Bede's College, Manchester from 1939 to 1946. He pursued an undergraduate education in mathematics at Manchester University, where he was taught by both Max Newman and Alan Turing, both now famous for their code breaking work at Bletchley Park in WW2. Churchhouse graduated with a first class honours degree and subsequently received an award to undertake a PhD in Number Theory at Trinity Hall, Cambridge under the supervision of Professor Louis J. Mordell. His time at Cambridge brought him into contact with other ex-Bletchley mathematicians.

== Career ==
In 1952, for his national service, Churchhouse joined the Royal Navy Scientific Service, and then the Government Communications Headquarters (GCHQ) where he worked for 11 years in London, Cheltenham, and at the UK's embassy in Washington. The GCHQ was interested in his work in number theory, and he was initially interviewed in May 1952. During his time at the GCHQ, he worked with Hugh Alexander and Jack Good both of whom had also worked at Bletchley Park on the breaking of the Enigma code. In 1962, he was appointed head of programming at the Atlas Computer Laboratory at Harwell where he worked on the Atlas I supercomputer until 1971.

Churchhouse left Atlas in 1971 and joined Cardiff University as an Inaugural Professor and head of the newly created Department of Computing Mathematics. He was also the Director of the Cardiff University Computer Centre for the early part of his tenure.

In 1965, Bob was asked to serve on the Flowers Committee responsible for the provision of computers to Universities and Research Councils and was subsequently asked to serve on the follow-up Computer Board. He chaired the Computer Board from 1979 to 1982 and was subsequently awarded a CBE for his services.

As a lifelong Catholic, he helped reorganise the Catholic Secondary Schools in Cardiff as well as serving on the Board of Governors of Saint David's Sixth Form College for 15 years. He was recognized for his service with a Papal Knighthood (KSG) in 1988.

== Bibliography ==
=== Books ===
- Churchhouse, Robert (2002). Codes and Ciphers: Julius Caesar, the Enigma and the Internet. Cambridge: Cambridge University Press. ISBN 978-0-521-00890-7.
- Churchhouse, Robert; Ledermann, Walter (1981). Handbook of Applicable Mathematics, Numerical Methods (Volume 3). Wiley. ISBN 978-0471279471.

=== Selected publications ===
- Churchhouse, Robert F. (1993). "Experience with some early computers". Computing & Control Engineering Journal. 4 (2): 63–67. doi:10.1049/cce:19930015 (inactive 12 July 2025).
- Churchhouse, R.F. Zanella, P. (Ed.). (1991). "Parallelism, fractal geometry and other aspects of computational mathematics". Singapore: World Scientific.
- Churchhouse, Robet F. (1969). "Congruence properties of the binary partition function". Mathematical Proceedings of the Cambridge Philosophical Society. 66 (2): 371–376. Bibcode:1969PCPS...66..371C. doi:10.1017/S0305004100045072.
- Churchhouse, Robert F.; Irving J., Good (1968). "The Riemann hypothesis and pseudorandom features of the Möbius sequence". Mathematics of Computation. 22 (104). American Mathematical Society: 857–861. doi:10.1090/S0025-5718-1968-0240062-8. ISSN 0025-5718.
- Churchhouse, Robert F. (1968). "Covering sets and systems of congruences". Computers in Mathematical Research: 20–36.
- Churchhouse, Robert F. (1954). "An Extension of the Minkowski-Hlawka Theorem". Mathematical Proceedings of the Cambridge Philosophical Society. 50 (2). Cambridge Philosophical Society: 220–224. Bibcode:1954PCPS...50..220C. doi:10.1017/S0305004100029261.
- Churchhouse, Robert F. (1953). "A Criterion for Irrationality". Canadian Journal of Mathematics. 5. Canadian Mathematical Society: 253–260. doi:10.4153/CJM-1953-028-8.

== Personal life ==
Churchhouse married Julia McCarthey. They had three sons. Churchhouse died of heart failure on 27 August 2018 at the age of 90.
