= All Hallows Roman Catholic High School =

All Hallows RC High School

Location
- 150 Eccles Old Road; Salford, Greater Manchester, M6 8AA; England
- Coordinates: 53.49145°N 2.31507°W

Information
- Type: Voluntary aided school
- Religious affiliation: Roman Catholic
- Local authority: Salford City Council
- Department for Education URN: 131512 Tables
- Ofsted: Reports
- Headteacher: Emma Walker
- Gender: Mixed
- Age: 11 to 16
- Website: http://www.allhallowssalford.com/

All Hallows RC High School is a mixed Roman Catholic secondary school in Salford, Greater Manchester, England.

It is a voluntary aided school administered by Salford City Council and the Roman Catholic Diocese of Salford. Pupils are mainly admitted from Catholic primary schools in Salford, including The Cathedral School of St Peter & St John RC in Salford, Holy Family RC Primary School in Salford, St Boniface RC Primary School in Higher Broughton, St Joseph's RC Primary School in Ordsall, St Sebastian's RC Primary School in Pendleton and St Thomas of Canterbury RC Primary School in Higher Broughton.

All Hallows RC High School offers GCSEs and Cambridge Nationals as programmes of study for pupils.
