= St Cuthbert's RC High School =

Location
- Shaw Road; Thornham; Rochdale, Greater Manchester, OL16 4RX; England
- Coordinates: 53.590206°N 2.139071°W

Information
- Type: Academy
- Religious affiliation: Roman Catholic
- Established: 1968
- Local authority: Rochdale Council
- Trust: St Teresa Of Calcutta Catholic Academy Trust
- Department for Education URN: 149873 Tables
- Ofsted: Reports
- Executive head: Emma Keenan
- Gender: Coeducational
- Age: 11 to 16
- Enrolment: 1,057 as of January 2026
- Capacity: 1,200
- Colours: Red, grey and black
- Website: stcuthberts.stoccat.org.uk

St Cuthbert's Roman Catholic High School is a coeducational secondary school in the Thornham area of Rochdale in Greater Manchester, England.

== History ==
St Cuthbert's was founded as Bishop Henshaw School in 1968 and was Rochdale's first Catholic secondary school. It became a middle school when Rochdale adopted the three-tier system. It was extended into a secondary school and renamed St Cuthbert's High School during the late 1980s following the Diocese of Salford's decision to scrap the three-tier system. The school moved into new buildings in January 2014.

Previously a voluntary aided school administered by Rochdale Metropolitan Borough Council, in November 2023 St Cuthbert's RC High School converted to academy status. The school is now sponsored by the St Teresa Of Calcutta Catholic Academy Trust, but continues to be under the jurisdiction of the Roman Catholic Diocese of Salford.

In February 2026, the school's staff went on strike due to pupil violence. The strikes plan to go on for 9 days, ending 12th March.

The letter informing parents and carers of the strike extension has been delayed by a few days. The strike will be suspended pending a meeting between the union and the academy. This is to allow the school to address its safety concerns for staff and students.

== Feeder schools ==
The school mainly accepts pupils from Alice Ingham RC Primary School, Holy Family RC Primary School, Sacred Heart RC Primary School, St Gabriel's RC Primary School, St John's RC Primary School, St Mary's RC Primary School, St Patrick's RC Primary School and St Vincent's RC Primary School.

== Academics ==
St Cuthbert's RC High School offers GCSEs and BTECs as programmes of study for pupils.

== Notable former pupils ==
Bishop Henshaw

- Tim O'Brien (physicist), from 1977 to 1982
- Paul Rowen, politician and former Member of Parliament (MP) for Rochdale

St Cuthbert's

- Johny Diba, former footballer who played as a goalkeeper for Rochdale
- Connor Ronan, footballer who plays as a midfielder for Colorado Rapids
- Axel Tuanzebe, footballer who plays for Burnley
