= John Arnold (bishop) =

British bishop

The Right Reverend John Arnold
- Bishop of Salford
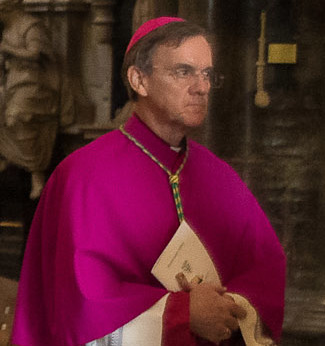
- Arnold in 2017
- Church: Roman Catholic Church
- Province: Liverpool
- Diocese: Salford
- Appointed: 30 September 2014
- Installed: 8 December 2014
- Predecessor: Terence Brain
- Previous posts: Auxiliary Bishop of Westminster (2006–2014); Titular Bishop of Lindisfarne (2006–2014)

Orders
- Ordination: 16 July 1983 by Cardinal Basil Hume OSB
- Consecration: 2 February 2006 by Cardinal Cormac Murphy-O'Connor

Personal details
- Born: John Stanley Kenneth Arnold; 12 June 1953 (age 73) Sheffield, England
- Denomination: Roman Catholic
- Education: Trinity College, Oxford
- Motto: quo fas vocat
- Coat of arms

John Stanley Kenneth Arnold (born 12 June 1953) is the eleventh Roman Catholic Bishop of Salford. He was formerly an auxiliary bishop of the Roman Catholic Archdiocese of Westminster and held the titular see of Lindisfarne.

== Early life ==
Arnold was born in Sheffield and attended Mylnhurst Convent School before attending Grace Dieu Manor School and Ratcliffe College, both schools run by the Institute of Charity (Rosminian Fathers). In 1975 he graduated with a law degree from Trinity College, Oxford and completed his legal qualification by being called to the Bar in the Middle Temple in 1976 after studies at the Council of Legal Education.

== Ordained ministry ==
Arnold never practised in the field of law and decided instead to pursue a vocation in the Catholic Church. He initially entered the novitiate of the Institute of Charity (Rosminians), taking simple vows in 1978, he then began his studies at the Pontifical Gregorian University, Rome. In 1981 he transferred to continue his training as a secular Priest for the Archdiocese of Westminster, continuing his studies at the Venerable English College, Rome and completing both a licence and a doctorate in canon law. He was ordained on 16 July 1983 by Cardinal Basil Hume OSB, the Archbishop of Westminster.

After his ordination he was a chaplain at Westminster Cathedral from 1985 to 1988 and from 1988 to 1993 vice-administrator of the cathedral. In 1993 he was appointed parish priest of Our Lady of Mount Carmel and St. George, in Enfield. From 2001 to 2005 he was vicar general and chancellor of the diocese.

In recognition of this work as a priest, he was named a Chaplain of His Holiness.

=== Auxiliary Bishop of Westminster ===
In December 2005, Arnold was appointed as an auxiliary bishop of Westminster, to which office he was consecrated a bishop by the Archbishop of Westminster, Cardinal Cormac Murphy-O'Connor, on 2 February 2006. He held responsibility for the pastoral care of the deaneries of Barnet, Brent, Enfield, Haringey and Harrow. He was also appointed as the chairman for the charity CAFOD, the Catholic Church's aid and development agency. Arnold was also appointed as patron of the Catholic Archives Society in 2008. although he was replaced in this role in 2021 by Bishop Robert Byrne of the Diocese of Hexham and Newcastle.

In September 2011, Arnold was selected by the Congregation for the Doctrine of the Faith to head up an apostolic visitation of Ealing Abbey to investigate extensive allegations of child abuse at the abbey. He later received criticism for his handling of the investigation, including letters to The Times claiming that he had failed to meet with complainants and review their evidence. and for his responses to an interview on the BBC Radio 4 Sunday Programme and would be called on in 2019 to give evidence on the matter to the IICSA enquiry board.

=== Bishop of Salford ===
On 30 September 2014, Arnold was appointed as the 11th Bishop of Salford to succeed Bishop Terence Brain who had retired upon reaching the age of 75. He was installed at Salford Cathedral on 8 December 2014.

In 2015, Arnold commenced a period of consultation to prepare the diocese for the future. A Proposal for Restructuring was published in July 2016, with feedback invited until October. The final plan was then published in January 2017. The plans involve a drastic reduction in the number of parishes and churches within the diocese. As of February 2021, 17 churches have been closed under this consultation, with one of these, the church of the Holy Rosary in Fitton Hill, named by conservationist Henrietta Billings as a heritage concern, calling it a threat to the Georg Mayer-Marton mosaic and fresco inside. Following a campaign the church was granted Grade II listed status in August 2022.

Arnold is the Lead Bishop of the Catholic Bishops Conference of England and Wales for the Environment, and has been working to convert the grounds of his official residence, Wardley Hall, into a Laudato Si' Centre, to be used for training and leading efforts in the Catholic Church on climate change.

In November 2021, a major renovation project was announced for Salford Cathedral requiring the closure of the building from March 2023 to December 2024.

In November 2022, Arnold retired as Chair of the Oxford and Cambridge Catholic Education Board, after serving for 16 years, being replaced by Bishop Nicholas Hudson.

=== Publications ===
- The Quality of Mercy (1993)

== Sources ==
- "The Right Reverend John Arnold". The Catholic Church in England and Wales.

Catholic Church titles
Preceded by Victor Guazzelli, auxiliary bishop of Westminster	Titular Bishop of Lindisfarne; 2005–2014	Succeeded by John Wilson
Preceded by Terence Brain	Bishop of Salford; 2014–present	Incumbent
