= John Bilsborrow =

Catholic bishop

The Right Reverend John Bilsborrow
- Bishop of Salford
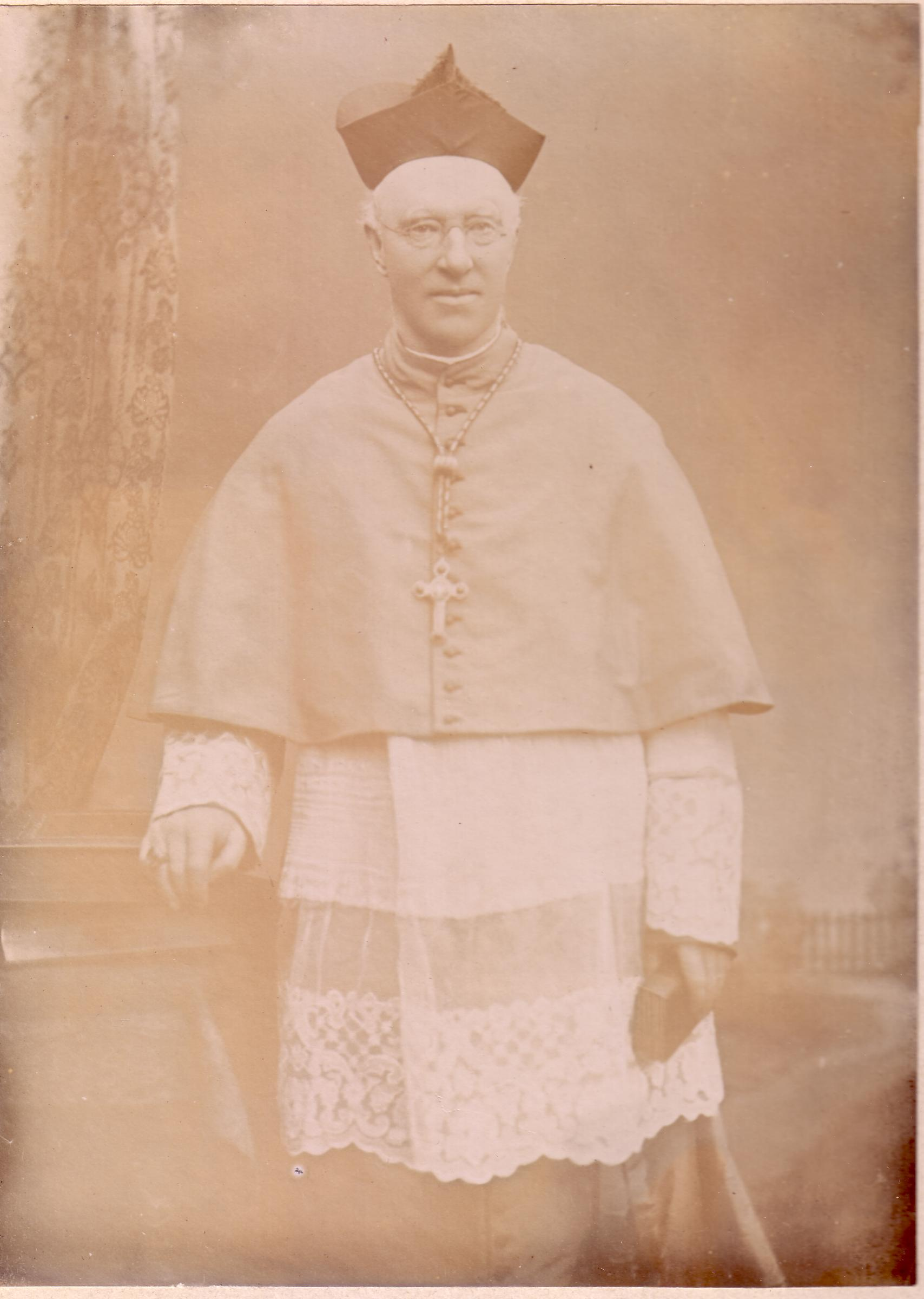
- Diocese: Salford
- Appointed: 11 June 1892
- Term ended: 5 March 1903
- Predecessor: Herbert Vaughan
- Successor: Louis Casartelli

Orders
- Consecration: 24 August 1892 by Herbert Vaughan

Personal details
- Born: 30 March 1836 Kirkham, Lancashire, England
- Died: 5 March 1903 (aged 66) Babbacombe, Torquay England
- Buried: St Joseph's Cemetery, Moston, Manchester, England
- Denomination: Roman Catholic

John Bilsborrow was bishop of the Roman Catholic Diocese of Salford from 1892 to 1903.

Bilsborrow was born in Singleton, Lancashire on 20 March 1836. He was ordained priest on 26 February 1865 at the age of 28. Following his ordination, he was posted to Barrow in Furness where he was tasked with establishing a new mission, he oversaw the building of the church of St Mary of Furness, which opened 28 August 1867. In 1872 he was transferred to St Mary's Church, Newsham, near Preston and from there established in 1883 the new mission of St Charles Borromeo, Grange over Sands.

In 1883, Bilsborrow was attached to the newly completed St Joseph's College in Upholland, West Lancashire as Vice-Rector, becoming Rector in 1885. While on the staff, he taught scripture, dogmatic, moral and ascetic theology.

On 15 July 1892, Bilsborrow was appointed third Bishop of Salford. He was ordained bishop on 24 August of the same year. He remained bishop of the Diocese until his death on 5 March 1903 at the age of 67.

Catholic Church titles
Preceded by Herbert Vaughan	Bishop of Salford; 1892–1903	Succeeded by Louis Casartelli
