= James Sharples (bishop) =

British Catholic bishop (1797–1850)

The Right Reverend James Sharples
- Coadjutor to the Vicar Apostolic of the Lancashire District
- Church: Roman Catholic Church
- Appointed: 7 August 1843
- Term ended: 11 August 1850
- Other post: Titular bishop of Samaria

Orders
- Ordination: 30 November 1823 (priest)
- Consecration: 15 August 1843 (bishop) by Giacomo Filippo Fransoni

Personal details
- Born: 19 October 1797 Liverpool, Lancashire
- Died: 11 August 1850 (aged 52) Eccleston, Lancashire
- Buried: St Mary's Churchyard, Great Eccleston, Lancashire
- Denomination: Roman Catholic
- Parents: Thomas and Elizabeth Sharples
- Education: Ushaw College; English College, Rome

James Sharples (1797–1850) was an English Roman Catholic bishop. He served as coadjutor to the Vicar Apostolic of the Lancashire District from 1843 until his death in 1850.

== Early life and ministry ==
James Sharples was born in Liverpool on 19 October 1797, the son of Thomas and Elizabeth Sharples. He began training for the priesthood at Ushaw College in County Durham on 27 January 1809. James left Ushaw on 21 September 1818, and continued with his studies at the English College, Rome, arriving there on 18 December 1818. He became a distinguished student, winning prizes in Theology and Hebrew. While at the English College, he was ordained a subdeacon on 21 December 1822, a deacon on 20 May 1823, and a priest on 30 November 1823. He left Rome in July 1824 to join the mission in the north of England.

At first he took temporary appointments at Lea and Kirkham before taking charge of the mission of St Alban's in Blackburn. He caused controversy when he placed a brass plaque with the word "Rectory" at the entrance of the clergy house in Blackburn, which offended Anglicans and lead to questions being asked in Parliament. However, the brass plaque remained for over a hundred years. After fourteen years at Blackburn, he was appointed to St Marie's Church, Sheffield in 1839, which later became the Cathedral Church of St Marie for the Roman Catholic Diocese of Hallam.

== Episcopal career ==
He was appointed coadjutor, with rights of succession, to Bishop George Hilary Brown, by the Propaganda Fide on 7 August 1843. The appointment was approved by Pope Gregory XVI on the same day, and dispatched on 8 August 1843. His brief to the titular see of Samaria was dated 11 August 1843, and he was consecrated titular bishop of Samaria at the Church of Sant'Agata dei Goti in Rome by Cardinal Giacomo Filippo Fransoni on 15 August 1843.

On his return to England, one of his first acts as a bishop was to bless the foundation stone of St. John's Church in Salford on 30 May 1844; which was opened in 1848, and subsequently became Salford Cathedral.

In July 1847, he returned to Rome as part of a deputation for talks on the restoration of the hierarchy in England and Wales, which included Nicholas Wiseman, the future Archbishop of Westminster. On the death of Bishop Thomas Griffiths, Wiseman had to return to London, leaving Sharples to remain in Rome until October 1847. Around that time his health took a turn for the worse. He brought back to England the proposal that the eight vicariates to be divided into twelve dioceses.

In 1850, he withdrew to Singleton, Lancashire for recuperation, but in June his doctors pronounced that any recovery of his condition was hopeless. He died in Eccleston, Lancashire on 11 August 1850, aged 52, just weeks before the hierarchy was restored. His remains are buried in St Mary's Churchyard in Great Eccleston.

== Bibliography ==
- Brady, W. Maziere (1876). The Episcopal Succession in England, Scotland and Ireland, A.D. 1400 to 1875. Vol. 3. Rome: Tipografia Della Pace.
- Schofield, Nicholas; Skinner, Gerard (2009). The English Vicars Apostolic. Oxford: Family Publications. ISBN 978-1-907380-01-3.
