= Diocese of Salford =

Catholic diocese in England

Coordinates: 53°29′N 2°16′W

Diocese of Salford Dioecesis Salfordensis

Catholic
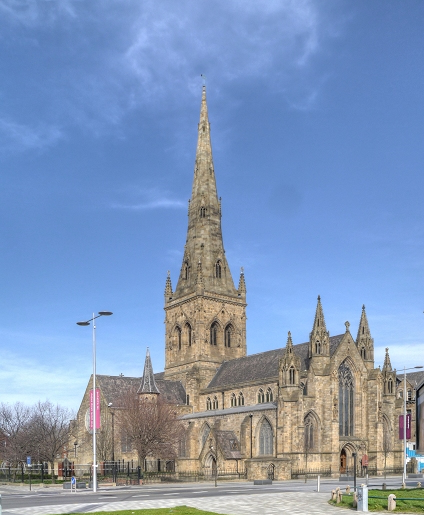
- Salford Cathedral

- Coat of arms

Location
- Country: England
- Territory: Most of Greater Manchester and neighbouring parts of Lancashire.
- Ecclesiastical province: Liverpool
- Metropolitan: Archdiocese of Liverpool

Statistics
- Area: 1,600 km^{2} (620 sq mi)
- Population: Total; Catholics: (as of 2017); 2,800,000; 294,000 (10.5%)
- Parishes: 145

Information
- Denomination: Roman Catholic
- Sui iuris church: Latin Church
- Rite: Roman Rite
- Established: 29 September 1850; 176 years ago
- Cathedral: Cathedral Church of St. John the Evangelist
- Secular priests: 251

Current leadership
- Pope: Leo XIV
- Bishop: John Arnold
- Metropolitan Archbishop: John Francis Sherrington
- Vicar General: Michael Cooke; John Daly; Peter Hopkinson
- Episcopal Vicars: Paul Daly; Gerald Murphy
- Judicial Vicar: Christopher Dawson
- Bishops emeritus: Terence Brain

Map
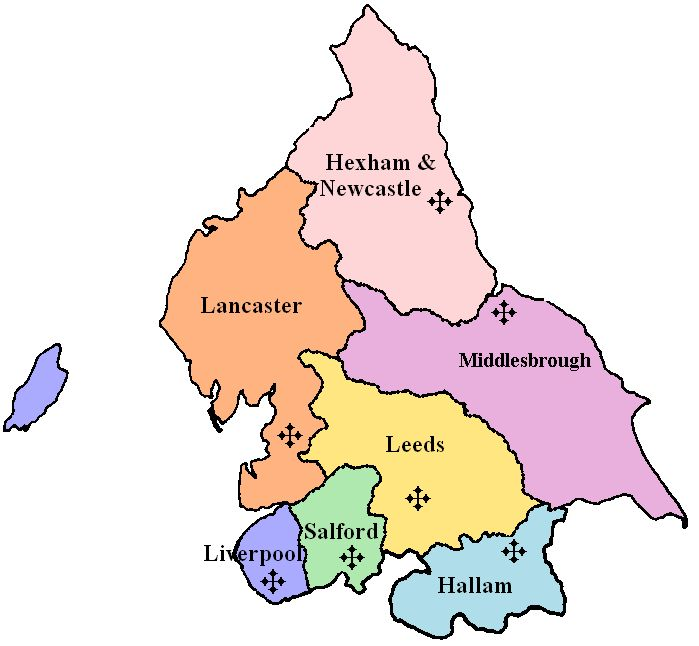
- The Diocese of Salford within the Province of Liverpool

Website
- dioceseofsalford.org.uk

The Diocese of Salford (Latin: Dioecesis Salfordensis) is a Latin diocese of the Catholic Church centred on the City of Salford in Greater Manchester, England. The diocese was founded in 1852 as one of the first post-Reformation Catholic dioceses in Great Britain. Since 1911 it has formed part of the Province of Liverpool.

Its current boundaries encompass Manchester as well as a large part of North West England between the River Mersey and the River Ribble, some parishes north of the Ribble, and Todmorden in West Yorkshire. In 2005, the diocese included 207 churches and chapels.

== History ==
The first post-Reformation Catholic chapel in Blackburn was opened in 1773, and that in Manchester in 1774 (in Rook Street, dedicated to St Chad). In 1843 James Sharples, rector of St. Alban's, Blackburn, was consecrated Titular Bishop of Samaria and appointed coadjutor to Bishop Brown, the first Vicar Apostolic of the Lancashire District. He built at Salford St. John's Church, which was opened in 1848 and which subsequently became the cathedral for the diocese.

Dr. Sharples died on 16 August 1850 and the first Bishop of Salford in the restored hierarchy was William Turner (1790–1872). He was succeeded in 1872 by Herbert Vaughan (1832–1903). On Vaughan's translation to Westminster in 1892, John Bilsborrow (1836–1903) was consecrated as the third bishop. Louis Charles Casartelli, the fourth bishop, was born in 1852, and ordained priest in 1876. He was closely associated with Cardinal Vaughan in the foundation of St. Bede's College, Manchester, in 1876, and was rector of it when he was nominated bishop in 1903. Bishop Casartelli was also a professor at the Catholic University of Leuven, and known as a writer on Oriental subjects.

== Bishops of Salford ==
=== Diocesan Bishops of Salford ===
- William Turner (appointed on 27 June 1851 – died on 13 July 1872)
- Herbert Vaughan (appointed on 27 September 1872 – translated to Westminster on 8 April 1892) (Cardinal in 1893)
- John Bilsborrow (appointed on 15 July 1892 – died on 5 March 1903)
- Louis Charles Casartelli (appointed on 28 August 1903 – died on 18 January 1925)
- Thomas Henshaw (appointed on 14 December 1925 – died on 23 September 1938)
- Henry Vincent Marshall (appointed on 5 August 1939 – died on 14 April 1955)
- George Andrew Beck (appointed on 28 November 1955 – translated to Liverpool on 29 January 1964)
- Thomas Holland (appointed on 28 August 1964 – retired on 22 June 1983)
- Patrick Altham Kelly (appointed on 9 March 1984 – translated to Liverpool on 21 May 1996)
- Terence Brain (appointed on 2 September 1997 – retired on 2 October 2014)
- John Arnold (appointed on 30 September 2014)

=== Auxiliary Bishops of Salford ===
- John Stephen Vaughan (appointed on 13 July 1909 – died on 4 December 1925).
- Geoffrey Burke (appointed on 26 May 1967 – retired on 12 September 1988).

=== Bishops of other dioceses who were priests of Salford diocese ===
- James Cunningham, appointed auxiliary bishop of Hexham and Newcastle in 1957
- George Patrick Dwyer, appointed Bishop of Leeds in 1957
- John Francis McNulty, appointed Bishop of Nottingham in 1932
- Thomas Leo Parker, appointed Bishop of Northampton in 1940
- Mark Davies, appointed Bishop of Shrewsbury in 2009, becoming Bishop in 2010

== Cathedral ==
The Cathedral Church of St. John the Evangelist, usually known as Salford Cathedral, is the seat of the Bishop of Salford and mother church of the Diocese of Salford. The cathedral is a Grade II listed building on Chapel Street, Salford. The foundation stone was laid in 1844 and the church opened in 1848. It was elevated to cathedral status in 1852 after the 1850 creation of the Diocese of Salford. The cathedral was consecrated in 1890 by the second Bishop of Salford, Herbert Vaughan, following the final repayment of debts from its construction.

== Schools ==
=== Primary ===
As of 2024, 165 voluntary aided state Roman Catholic primary schools (often denoted in their names by VA, RC or RCPS) are in the Diocese of Salford, located across the local authorities of Blackburn, Bolton, Bury, Calderdale, Lancashire, Manchester, Oldham, Rochdale, Salford, Stockport, Tameside, Trafford, and Wigan.

=== Secondary ===
There are 26 voluntary aided local authority maintained Roman Catholic high schools (RCHS) and sixth-form colleges:

- All Hallows RCHS, Salford
- Brownedge St Mary's RCHS, Bamber Bridge
- Cardinal Langley RCHS & Sixth Form College, Middleton
- Holy Cross Sixth Form College, Bury
- Holy Family RC & CE College, Heywood
  (with the Anglican Diocese of Manchester)
- Loreto RCHS, Chorlton-cum-Hardy
- Loreto Sixth Form College, Hulme
- Mount Carmel RCHS, Accrington
- Mount St Joseph RCHS, Bolton
- Our Lady & St John Catholic College, Blackburn
- Our Lady RCHS, Blackley
- St John Henry Newman RC College, Chadderton
- Ss John Fisher And Thomas More RCHS, Colne
- St Ambrose Barlow RCHS, Swinton, Salford
- St Bede's RCHS, Blackburn
- St Cecilia's RCHS, Longridge
- St Cuthbert's RCHS, Rochdale
- St Damian RC Science College, Ashton-under-Lyne
- St Joseph RC High School, Horwich
- St Matthew's RCHS, New Moston, Manchester
- St Patrick's RCHS, Eccles, Salford
- St Peter's RCHS, Manchester
- St Thomas More RC College, Denton
- The Barlow RCHS, Manchester
- Thornleigh Salesian College, Bolton
- Xaverian Sixth Form College, Manchester

A further seven secondary schools are run as academies:

- All Saints RCHS, Rawtenstall
- Blessed Trinity RCHS, Burnley
- St Anne's RCHS, Heaton Chapel
- St Antony's RCHS, Urmston
- St Augustine RCHS, Billington
- St Gabriel's RCHS, Bury
- St Monica's RCHS, Prestwich

=== Special education ===
St John Vianney Special School in Firswood, Manchester, teaches pupils aged 5 to 19.

=== Private ===
The following private Catholic schools also exist in the Diocese of Salford as of 2024:

- Oakhill School and Nursery, Clitheroe
- St Bede's College and Preparatory School, Manchester
- St Joseph's Park Hill School, Burnley
- Stella Maris School, Stockport
- Stonyhurst College and St Mary's Hall Preparatory School, Clitheroe

== See also ==
- List of Catholic churches in the United Kingdom
