= Salford Cathedral =

Catholic cathedral in Salford, Greater Manchester, England

- Cathedral Church of St. John the Evangelist
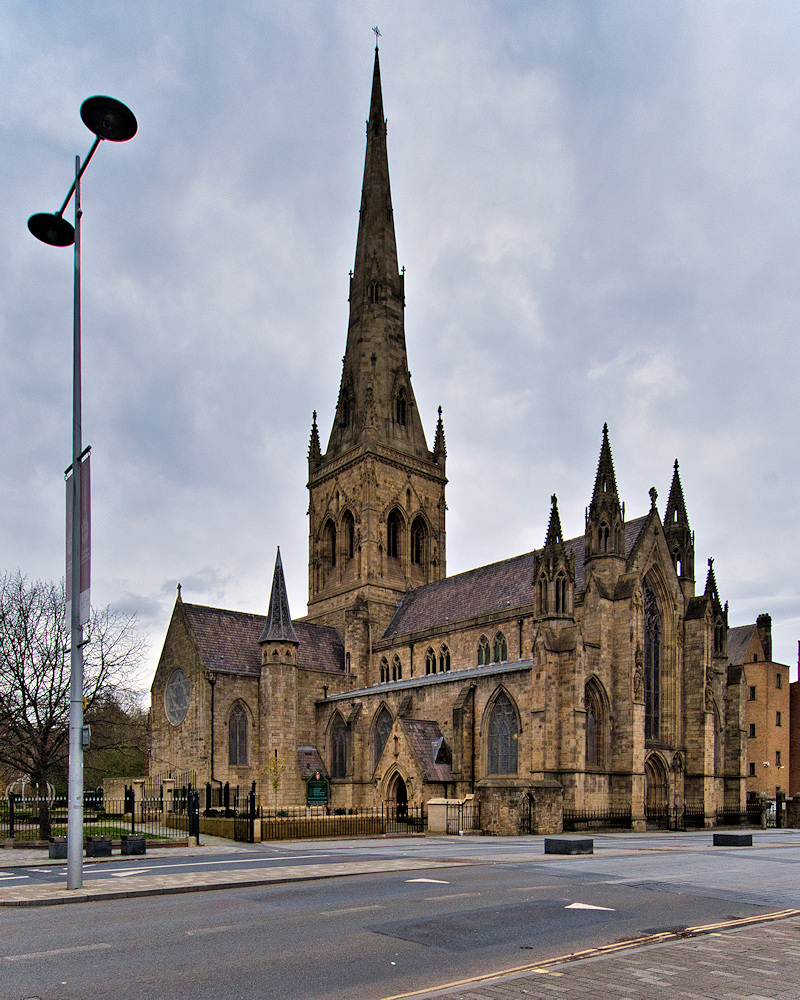
- Exterior of Salford Cathedral

- Location within Greater Manchester
- 53.4836°N 2.2610°W
- OS grid reference: SJ 82789 98598
- Location: Salford, Greater Manchester
- Country: England
- Denomination: Catholic
- Tradition: Catholic

History
- Status: Active
- Consecrated: 1890; 136 years ago

Architecture
- Functional status: Active
- Heritage designation: Grade II* listed
- Architect: Matthew Ellison Hadfield
- Style: Gothic Revival and neo-Gothic
- Years built: 1844–48

Administration
- Province: Liverpool (since 1911)
- Diocese: Salford
- Deanery: Salford

Clergy
- Bishop: Rt. Rev. John Arnold
- Dean: Rev. Fr. Michael Jones

The Cathedral Church of St. John the Evangelist, usually known as Salford Cathedral, is a Catholic cathedral on Chapel Street in Salford, Greater Manchester, England. It is the seat of the Bishop of Salford and mother church of the Diocese of Salford, and is a Grade II* listed building.

== History ==
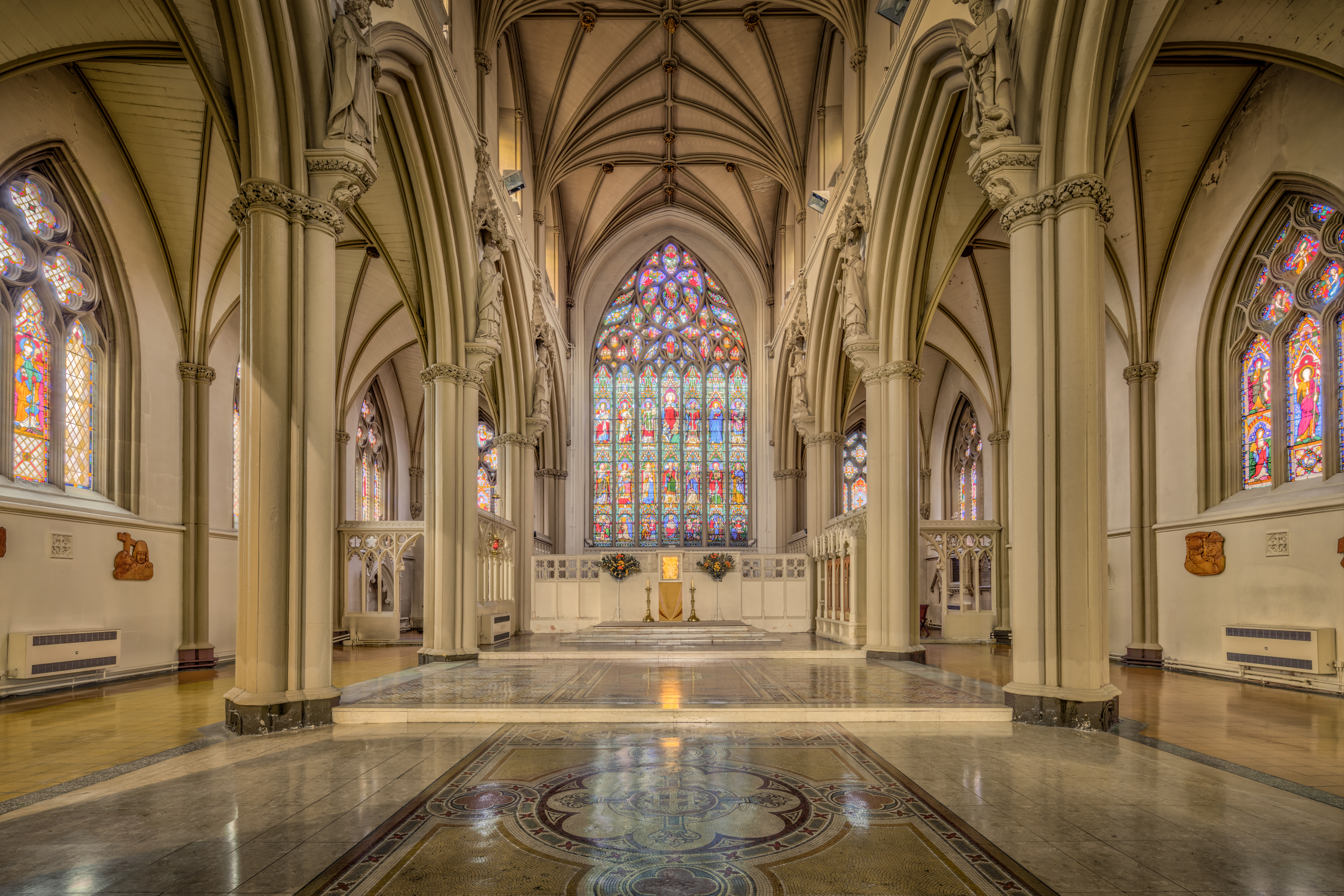
Interior of the Cathedral

St. John's Church, Salford, was built between 1844 and 1848 to designs of Matthew Ellison Hadfield (1812–1885) of Weightman and Hadfield of Sheffield, by Benjamin Hollins of Manchester. Hadfield's design for St. John's, the first cruciform Catholic church to be built in England since the Reformation, was closely modelled on a number of noted medieval churches. The "west" (actually south) front and nave are copied on a reduced scale from Howden Minster in the East Riding of Yorkshire; the choir and sanctuary are closely modelled on those of Selby Abbey in North Yorkshire; the decorations of the rib vault are copied from the church of St Jacques in Liège, Belgium; the tower and spire, the latter the tallest in Lancashire at the time of building, are derived from the church of St Mary Magdalene, Newark-on-Trent in Nottinghamshire.

Two local businessmen, Daniel Lee (d. 1858) and John Leeming (d. 1877), each donated £1,000 towards the cost of the church and furnishings; both benefactors are commemorated in chantries at the liturgical east end of the choir. The cathedral's "east" window of 1856, by William Wailes of Newcastle, depicts the history of Catholic Christianity in England, from the conversion of Ethelbert by St. Augustine in 597, to the restoration of the Catholic hierarchy in 1850. The total cost of building the cathedral was £18,000.

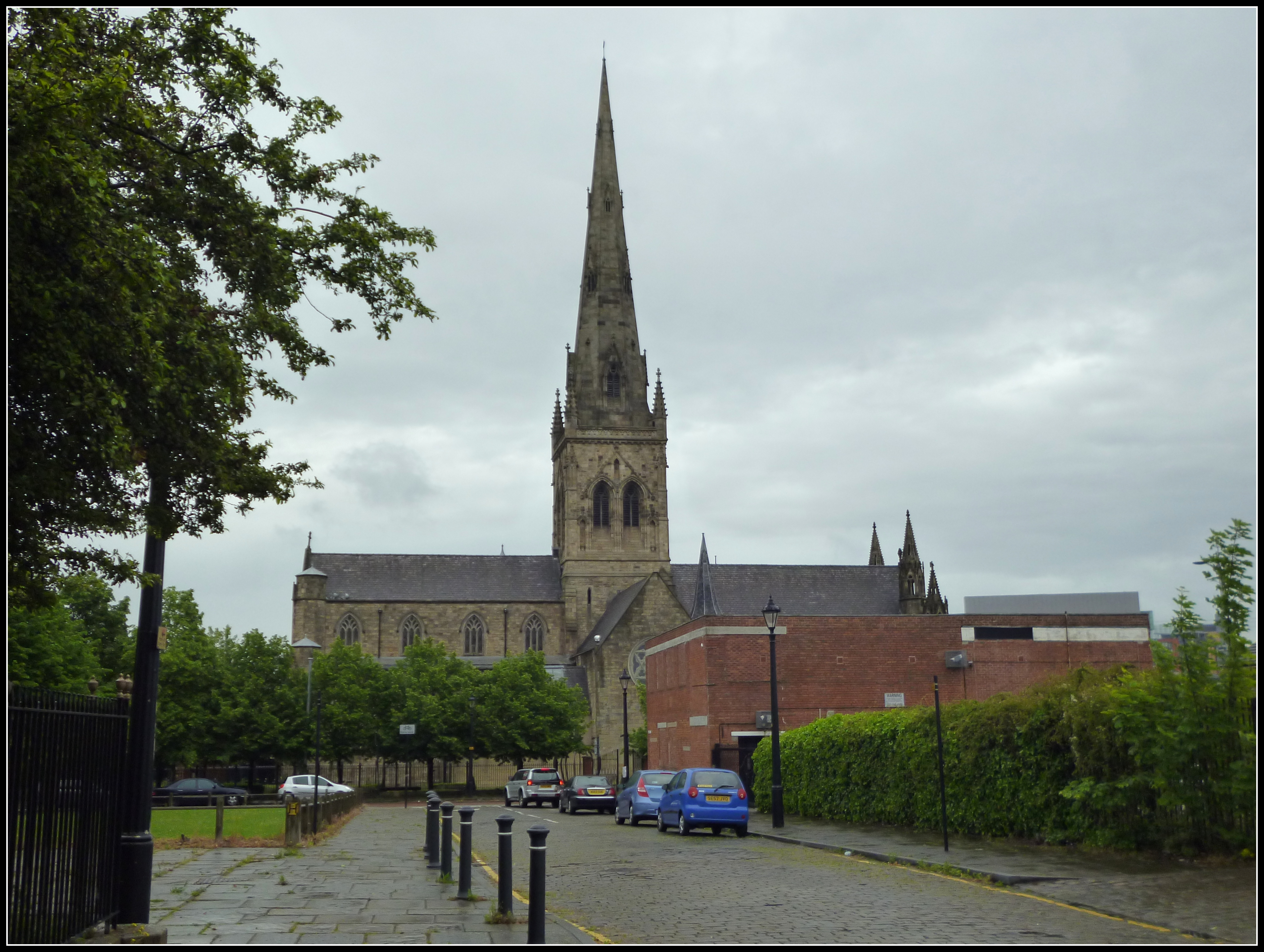
Outside the Cathedral

The foundation stone was laid in 1844 by Bishop James Sharples, coadjutor to Bishop George Brown, Vicar Apostolic of the Lancashire District. The church was opened on 9 August 1848: Bishop Brown celebrated a Solemn High Mass in the presence of the Bishops of the other Vicariates of England and Wales. St. John's was elevated to cathedral status in 1852 following the erection in September 1850 of the Diocese of Salford, becoming one of the first four Catholic cathedrals in England and Wales since the English Reformation. On 25 July 1851, William Turner was consecrated the first Bishop of Salford in St. John's. In the same ceremony the Rector of St. John's, George Errington was consecrated first Bishop of Plymouth.

Thirty years later in October 1881, a violent storm caused serious damage to the cathedral's 240-foot (73.2 m) spire. Canon Beesley, then the administrator, succeeded in raising funds for repairs to the spire and generally refurbishing the fabric of the building. He also oversaw the furnishing of the new chapel of the blessed sacrament in the "south" transept in 1884, to designs of Peter Paul Pugin, third son of A.W.N. Pugin.

By early 1890, the last £1,000 was paid to settle the original debt for the building of the cathedral, which led to the consecration of the cathedral in the same year by the second Bishop of Salford, Herbert Vaughan, later to become Cardinal Archbishop of Westminster.

In 1919–20, the turrets on the "west" front were found to be in danger of collapsing on to the street below. They were taken down and rebuilt by the Sheffield firm of O'Neill & Son under the direction of Charles M. Hadfield, grandson of the cathedral's original architect. In 1924, the War Memorial Chapel in the "north" transept was opened, commemorating the fallen in World War I. By 1934 the cathedral's spire was found to have strayed from the perpendicular and the civic authorities ordered that some 60 feet (18 m) be removed. Repairs were not completed until 1938. Restoration and repair of damage sustained in the Second World War was carried out in the immediate post-war years.

Further restoration and re-ordering were carried out in 1971–72 at a cost of £80,000. This included the erection of a new free-standing altar located under the crossing, following the Second Vatican Council. A further re-ordering of the choir (chancel) took place in 1988, including the removal of the original stone high altar and reredos, installed in 1853–55 to designs by George Goldie.

A new stained-glass west window was installed in 1994, to commemorate the 150th anniversary of the laying of the cathedral's foundation stone. Its title is When I am lifted up I shall draw all to myself, and it depicts, in somewhat abstract form, the crucified Christ flanked by the Virgin Mary and the cathedral's patron, St. John.

Restoration of the external stonework to the spire and "west" (i.e. south) front took place in the spring of 2007. Further major repairs to the roof and masonry to stop leaks within the church took place in 2018.

In November 2021, it was announced that Salford Cathedral would be closed for the year until 2024 due to a multi-million-pound restoration project. This is set to include reinstalling some of the cathedral's Victorian heritage which was stripped in the 1970s and a new roof being added to the building.

== Organ ==
A new four-manual digital organ was installed by Makin in 2002. While digital organs are still uncommon in cathedrals, the current instrument has a versatile stop list and is an improvement on its predecessor, with speakers located in the clerestory windows above the nave to help with choir and congregational singing. The current organ replaced a two-manual Jardine pipe organ which was installed in 1951; the console located in the south aisle near the crossing, with the pipe case in the west gallery. The Jardine instrument was a rebuild of a short-lived experimental design by Compton of 1938, involving remote pipework relayed into the cathedral by microphones and loudspeakers, with some of the Compton pipework re-used in the Jardine instrument. The earliest instrument in Cathedral records was a four-manual instrument by W.E. Richardson sited in the north transept, installed in 1887.

== Gallery ==
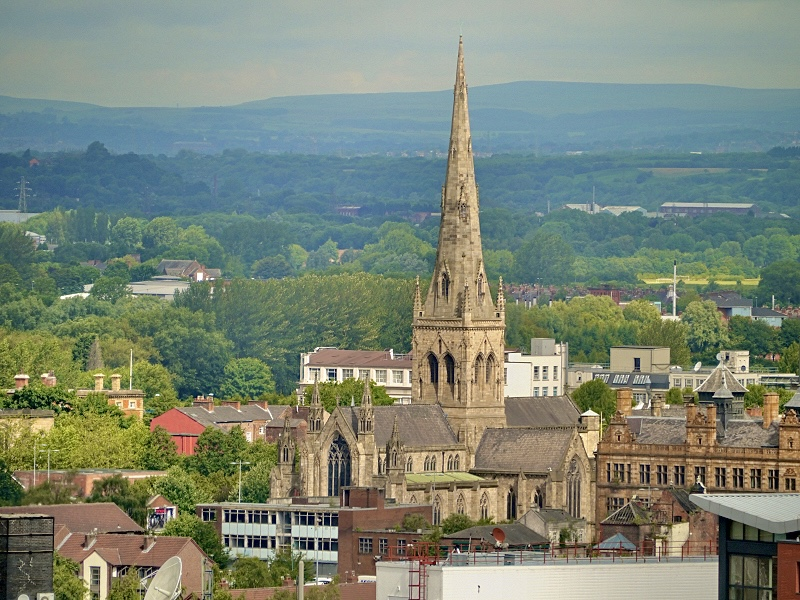
Aerial view: Salford Cathedral

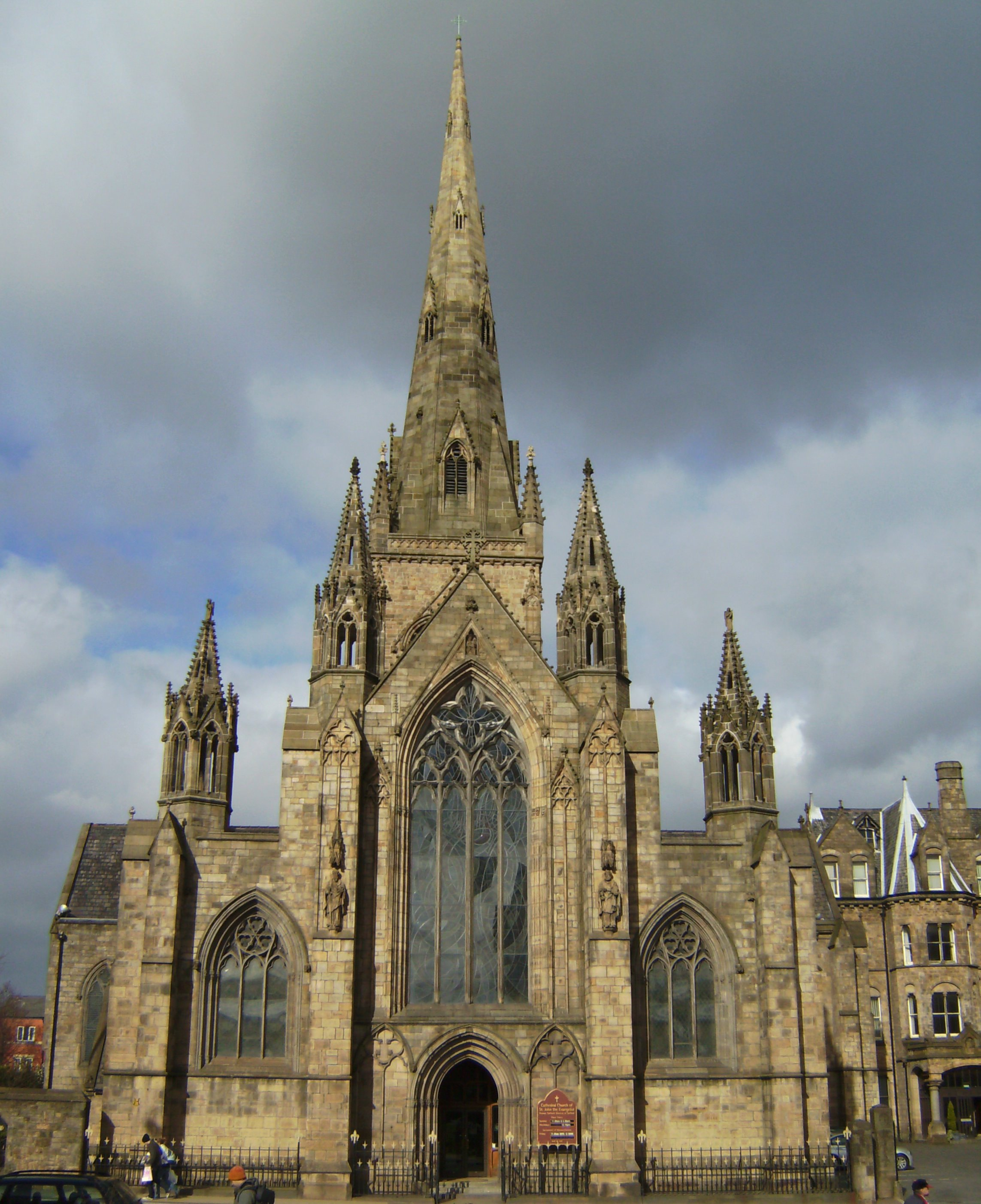
Exterior: Salford Cathedral

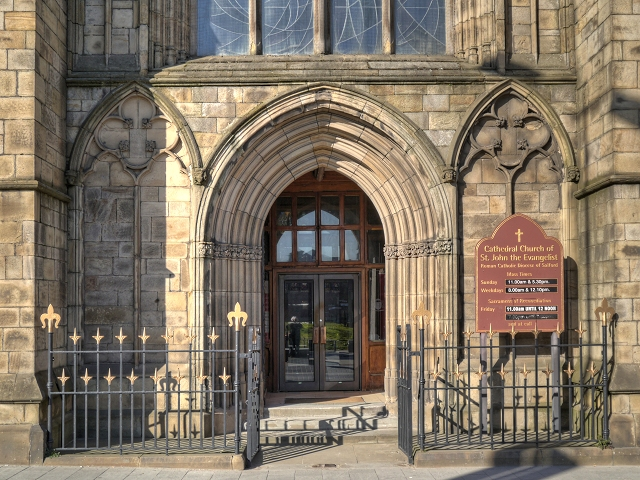
Exterior: Entrance to the Cathedral

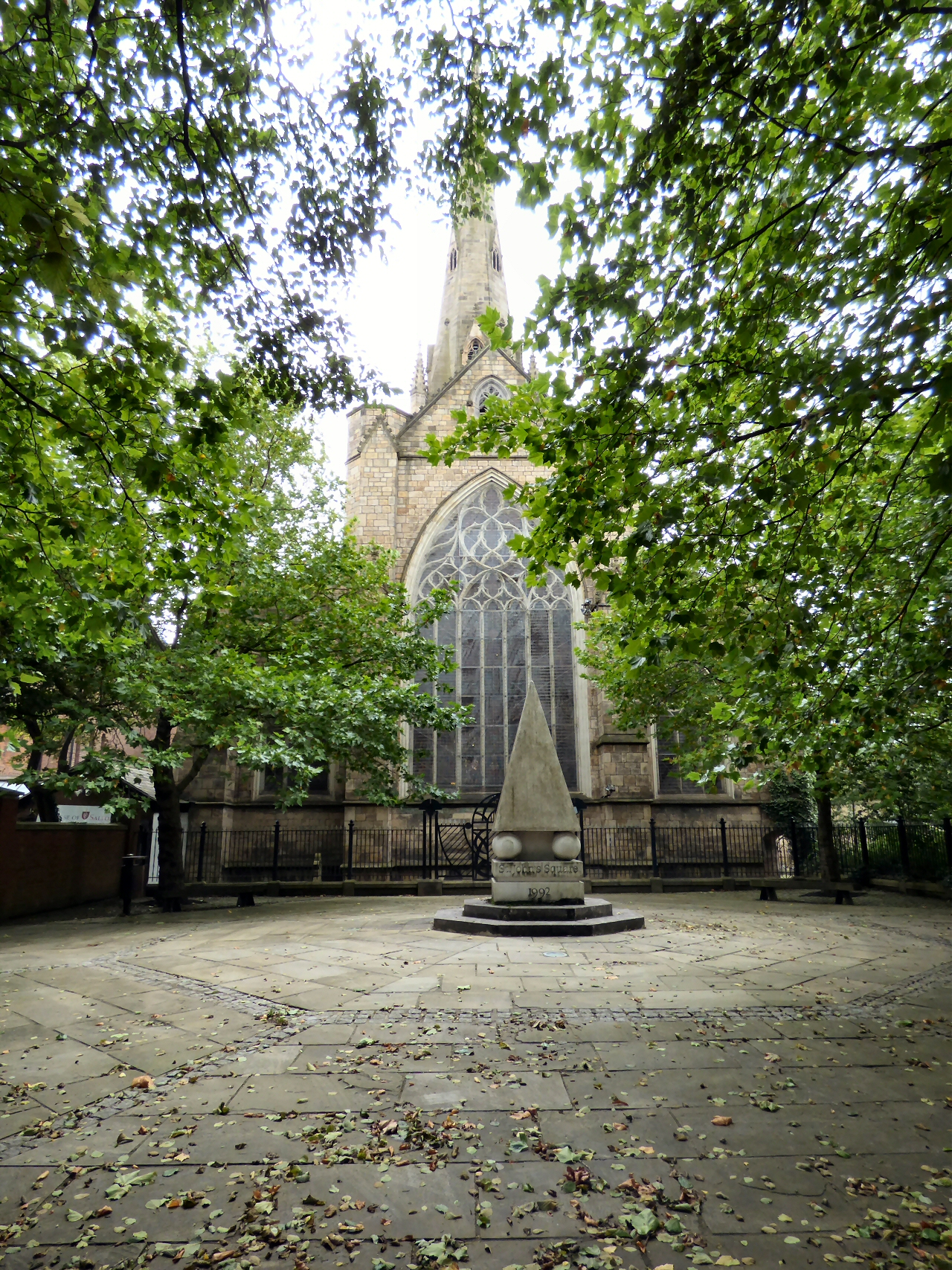
Exterior: Pyramid in St John's Square

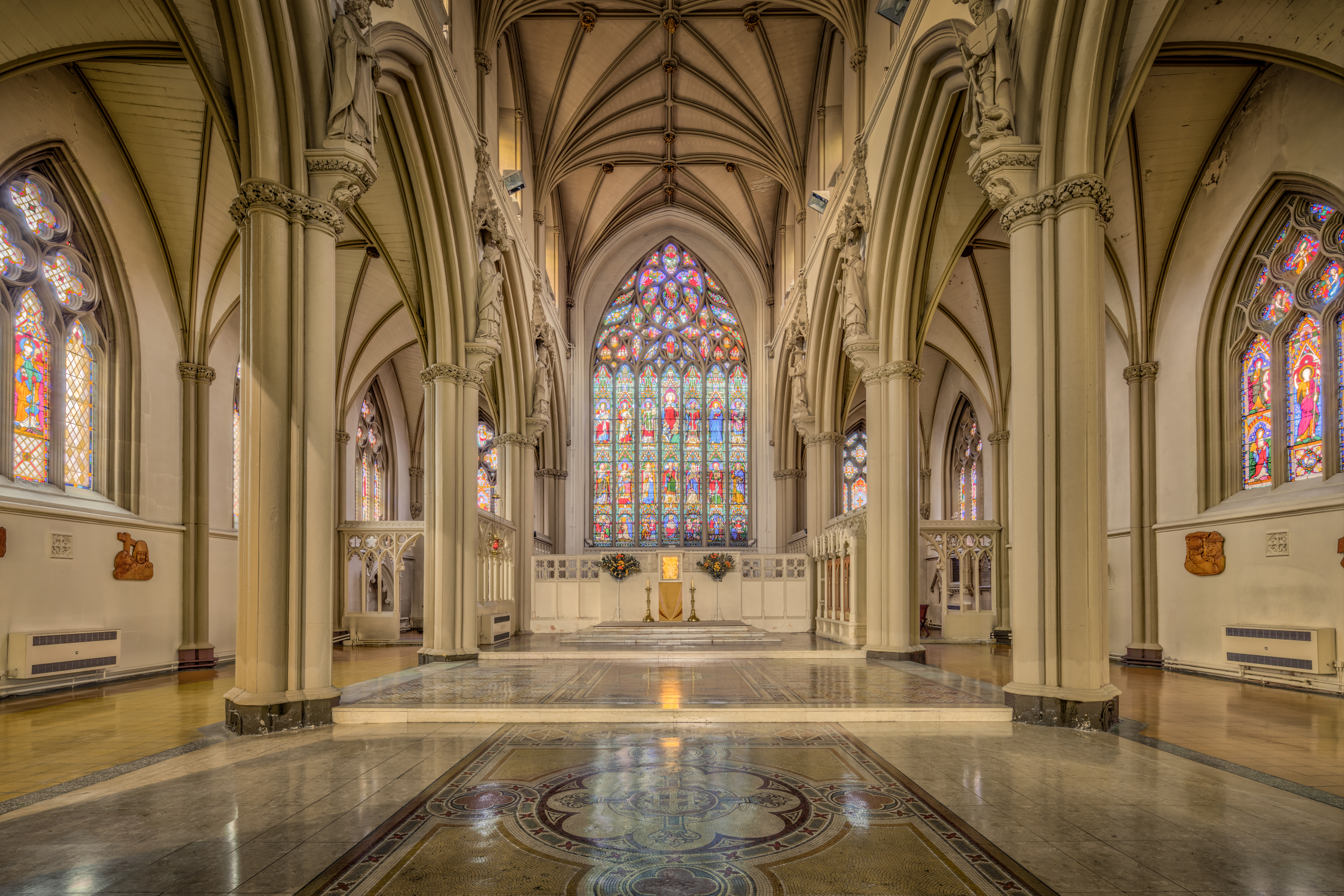
Interior: Nave of the Cathedral

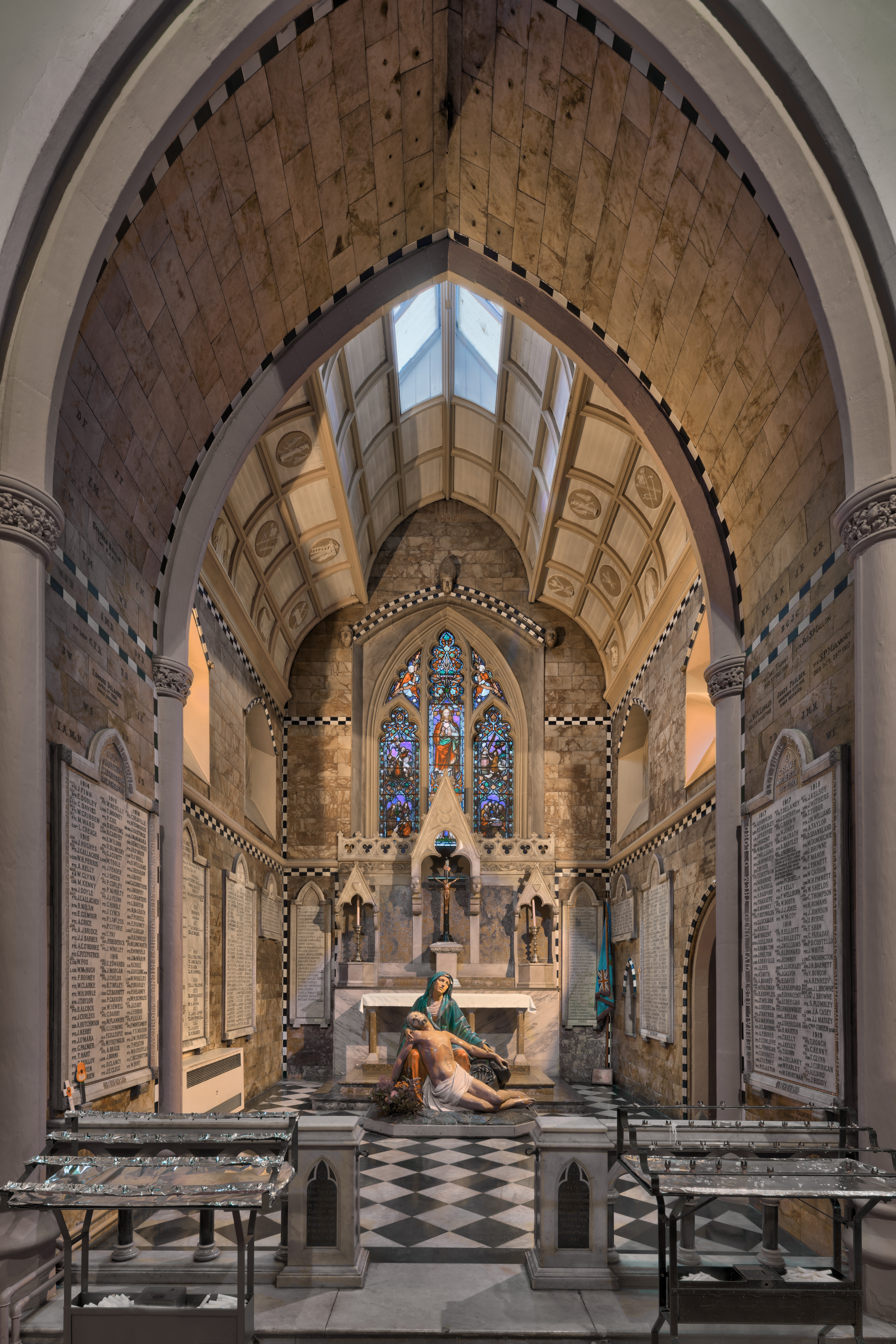
Interior: Memorial Chapel

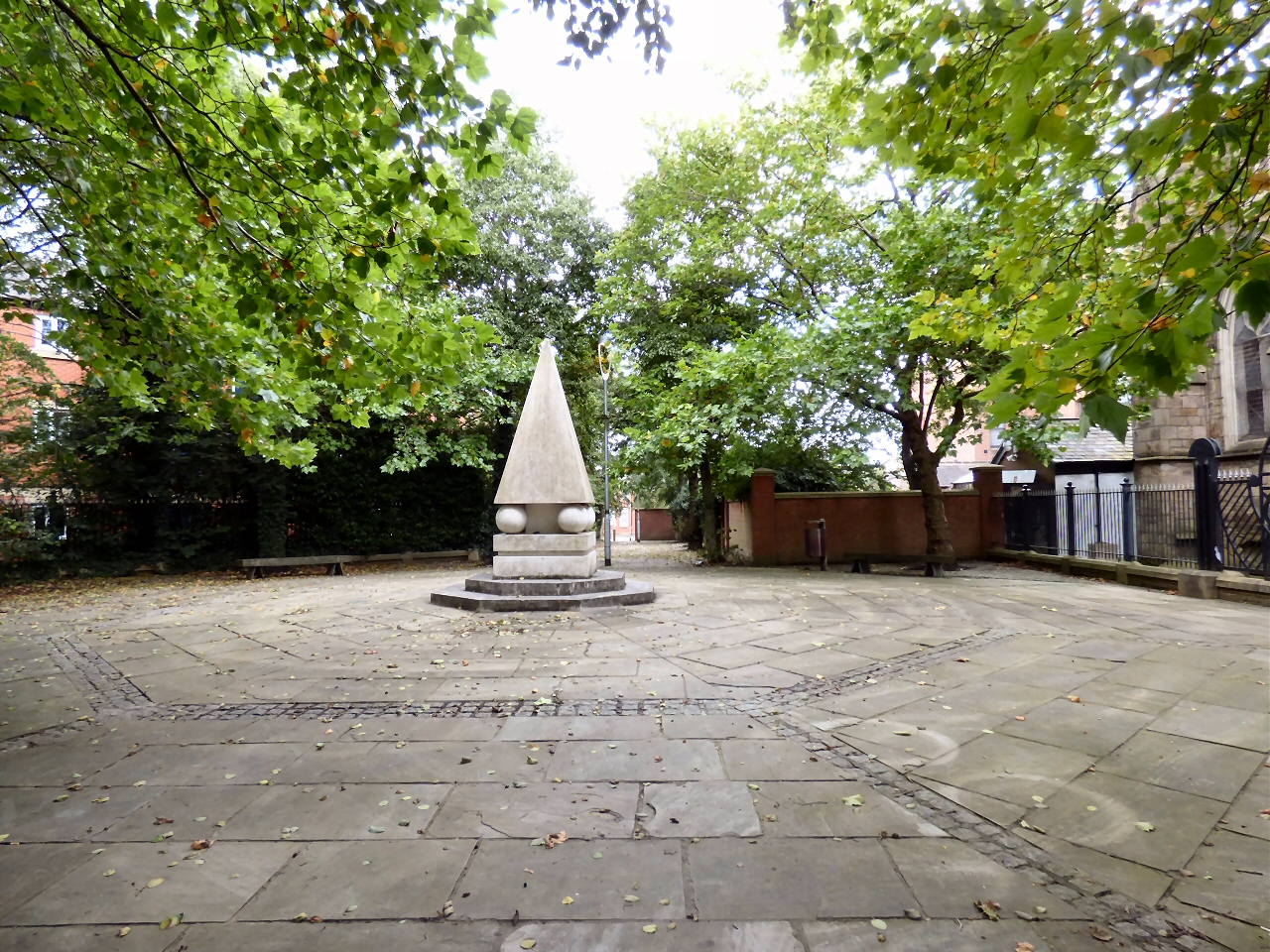
Exterior: Pyramid in St John's Square

== See also ==
- Grade II* listed buildings in Greater Manchester
- Listed buildings in Salford, Greater Manchester
- List of tallest buildings and structures in Salford
