= Apostolic Vicariate of the Lancashire District =

Former Latin Catholic jurisdiction in England

The Apostolic Vicariate of the Lancashire District

Location
- Country: England
- Territory: Lancashire, Cheshire, and the Isle of Man

Information
- Denomination: Catholic Church
- Sui iuris church: Latin Church
- Rite: Roman Rite
- Established: 1840
- Dissolved: 29 September 1850

Leadership
- Pope: Gregory XVI (1831–1846); Pius IX (1846–1878)
- Vicar Apostolic: George Hilary Brown
- Coadjutor: James Sharples

The Apostolic Vicariate of the Lancashire District was an ecclesiastical jurisdiction of the Catholic Church in England. It was led by a vicar apostolic who was a titular bishop. The apostolic vicariate was created in 1840 and was replaced by two dioceses in 1850.

== History ==
The Apostolic Vicariate of the Lancashire District was created out of the Northern District on 11 May 1840. The Lancashire District comprised the historic counties of Lancashire and Cheshire, plus the Isle of Man. The vicar apostolic of the district was Bishop George Hilary Brown, who was appointed on 5 June 1840. Three years later, Bishop James Sharples was appointed coadjutor vicar apostolic on 7 August 1843 to assist Bishop Brown in overseeing the district.

On the restoration of the hierarchy in England and Wales by Pope Pius IX on 29 September 1850, thirteen dioceses were established. Most of the Lancashire District was replaced by the dioceses of Liverpool and Salford. The Diocese of Liverpool comprised the hundreds of West Derby, Leyland, Lonsdale and Amounderness in Lancashire, plus the Isle of Man. The Liverpool diocese was later elevated to the status of archdiocese on 28 October 1911. The Diocese of Salford comprised the hundreds of Salford and Blackburn in Lancashire. The remainder of the district, the county of Cheshire, became part of the Diocese of Shrewsbury.

== Vicars Apostolic ==
Vicars Apostolic of the Lancashire District
From	Until	Incumbent	Notes
1840	1850	George Hilary Brown	Appointed Vicar Apostolic of the Lancashire District and Titular Bishop of Bugia on 5 June 1840 and consecrated on 24 August 1840. Exchanged the titular see of Bugia to the titular see of Tlos on 22 April 1842. Appointed the first Bishop of Liverpool on 29 September 1850 when the district divided.
1843	1850	(James Sharples)	Appointed Coadjutor Vicar Apostolic of the Lancashire District and Titular Bishop of Sebaste in Palaestina on 11 August 1843 and consecrated on 15 August 1843. Died in office on 11 August 1850.
In 1850, the title was replaced by the bishoprics of Liverpool and Salford.

== Bibliography ==
- Brady, W. Maziere (1876). The Episcopal Succession in England, Scotland and Ireland, A.D. 1400 to 1875. Vol. 3. Rome: Tipografia Della Pace.
