= Herbert Vaughan =

English Catholic prelate (1832–1903)

His Eminence Herbert Vaughan MHM
- Cardinal, Archbishop of Westminster
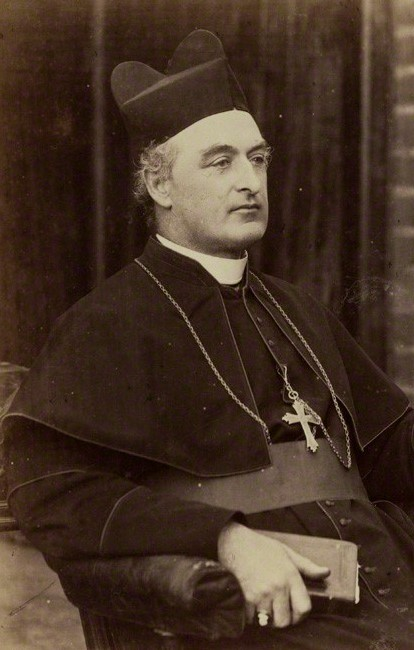
- Vaughan, 1890s
- Church: Catholic Church
- Province: Westminster
- Diocese: Westminster
- Appointed: 8 April 1892
- Term ended: 19 June 1903
- Predecessor: Henry Edward Manning
- Successor: Francis Bourne
- Other post: Cardinal-Priest of Santi Andrea e Gregorio al Monte Celio
- Previous post: Bishop of Salford (1872‍–‍1892)

Orders
- Ordination: 28 October 1854 by Giulio Arrigoni
- Consecration: 28 October 1872 by Henry Edward Manning
- Created cardinal: 16 January 1893 by Leo XIII
- Rank: Cardinal-priest

Personal details
- Born: Herbert Alfred Vaughan; 15 April 1832 Gloucester, United Kingdom
- Died: 19 June 1903 (aged 71) Mill Hill, United Kingdom
- Buried: Westminster Cathedral
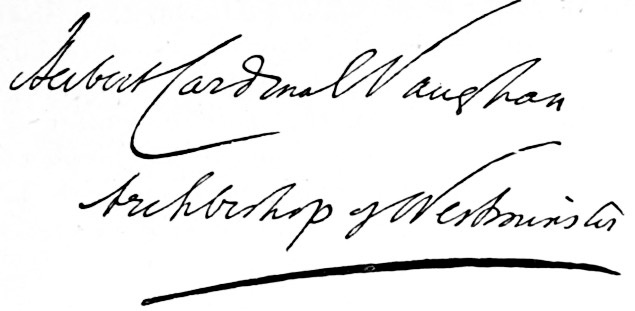
- Signature

- Coat of arms

Herbert Alfred Henry Joseph Thomas Vaughan MHM (15 April 1832 – 19 June 1903) was an English prelate of the Catholic Church. He served as Archbishop of Westminster from 1892 until his death in 1903, and was elevated to the cardinalate in 1893. He was the founder in 1866 of St Joseph's Foreign Missionary Society, known best as the Mill Hill Missionaries. He also founded the Catholic Truth Society and St. Bede's College, Manchester. As Archbishop of Westminster, he led the capital campaign and construction of Westminster Cathedral.

In 1871 Vaughan sent a group of Mill Hill priests to the United States to minister to freedmen. In 1893, the American branch of the society spun off, with Vaughan's permission, to form the Society of St Joseph of the Sacred Heart, whose members are known as Josephites.

== Early life and education ==
Herbert Vaughan was born at Gloucester, the eldest son of Lieutenant-Colonel John Francis Vaughan, of an old recusant (Catholic) family, the Vaughans of Courtfield, Herefordshire. His mother, Eliza Rolls from The Hendre, Monmouthshire, was a Catholic convert and intensely religious. All five of the Vaughan daughters became nuns, while six of the eight sons received Holy Orders and became priests. Two were later called as bishops in addition to Herbert: Roger became Archbishop of Sydney, Australia and John became titular bishop of Sebastopolis and auxiliary bishop in Salford, England. A nephew, Francis, became Bishop of Menevia, Wales.

In 1841 Herbert, the eldest, went to study for six years at Stonyhurst College, then to the Jesuit school of Brugelette, Belgium (1846–1848), and then with the Benedictines at Downside Abbey, near Bath, England.

In 1851 Vaughan went to Rome, and studied for two years at the Collegio Romano, where for a time he shared lodgings with the poet, Aubrey Thomas de Vere. He became a friend and disciple of Henry Edward Manning. Manning, a Catholic convert, became the second Cardinal Archbishop of Westminster following the restoration of the Catholic hierarchy in Great Britain in 1850.

== Career ==
Vaughan received Holy Orders at Lucca in 1854. On his return to England, he became Vice-President of St Edmund's College, at that time the chief seminary in the south of England for candidates for the priesthood. Since childhood, Vaughan had been filled with zeal for foreign missions. He convinced Cardinal Wiseman and the bishops to agree to a proposal to build a seminary in England that would train priests to serve on missions throughout the British Empire. With this goal, he made a fund-raising trip to America in 1863, from which he returned with £11,000.

In 1868, Vaughan became proprietor of The Tablet. He wrote James McMaster, owner of the New York Freeman's Journal and Catholic Register, "No one can appreciate more highly than I do the great mission of the Catholic press in these days of steam and universal education."

He succeeded in opening St Joseph's Foreign Missionary College, Mill Hill Park, London, in 1869. That same year, the Tenth Provincial Council of Baltimore passed a decree exhorting all bishops to establish missions and schools in their dioceses for African Americans. Subsequently, the Council Fathers wrote a letter requesting clergy for that purpose to Vaughan, superior general at Mill Hill. In 1871, Vaughan led a group of priests to the US to establish a mission society to minister to freedmen in the South.

In 1872 Vaughan was consecrated as the second Bishop of Salford, succeeding Bishop William Turner. Vaughan relinquished his position as superior at St. Joseph's College, but in 1876 established St Bede's College, conceived as a "commercial school" to prepare the sons of Manchester Catholics for a life in business and the professions. Vaughan chose to live at Hampton Grange, on the St. Bede's College campus, with his own Bishop's residence on Chapel Street in Salford being given over to a Seminary.

In 1879, as the most eminent local Catholic, Vaughan was chosen by the then Home Secretary, R.A. Cross, 1st Viscount Cross, to be one of the trustees of the £1,000 compensation paid to a Whalley Range farm labourer, William Habron, pardoned for the murder of PC Nicholas Cock. In 1892 Vaughan succeeded Manning as Archbishop of Westminster, receiving the cardinal's hat in 1893 as Cardinal-Priest of Santi Andrea e Gregorio al Monte Celio.

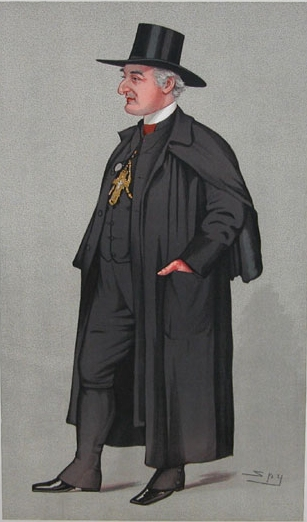
Caricature of Archbishop Vaughan by Leslie Ward on 7 January 1893 edition of Vanity Fair (British magazine)

Vaughan was a man of different type from his predecessor; he had none of the ultramontane Manning's intellectual finesse or his ardor for social reform. Vaughan did however have a more open attitude to women's enfranchisement, reported as saying, "I believe that the extension of the Parliamentary Franchise to women upon the same conditions as it is held by men would be a just and beneficial measure, tending to raise rather than to lower the course of national legislation." Vaughan was an ecclesiastic of remarkably fine presence and aristocratic leanings, intransigent in theological policy, and in personal character simply devout.

In 1893 the US Mill Hill mission, based in Baltimore, Maryland, reorganised with Vaughan's blessing as an independent institution, known as Society of St. Joseph of the Sacred Heart. Among its founders was the first African-American Catholic priest trained and ordained in the United States, Charles Uncles.

It was due to this theological "purity" that Vaughan assisted in scuttling an opportunity for rapprochement between Rome and the Church of England that was put into motion by a high-church Anglican, Charles Wood, 2nd Viscount Halifax and a French priest, Ferdinand Portal. Through the efforts of Vaughan and Archbishop of Canterbury Edward White Benson, this early form of ecumenism was put down. It culminated with the condemnation of Anglican Orders by Pope Leo XIII in his bull, Apostolicae curae.

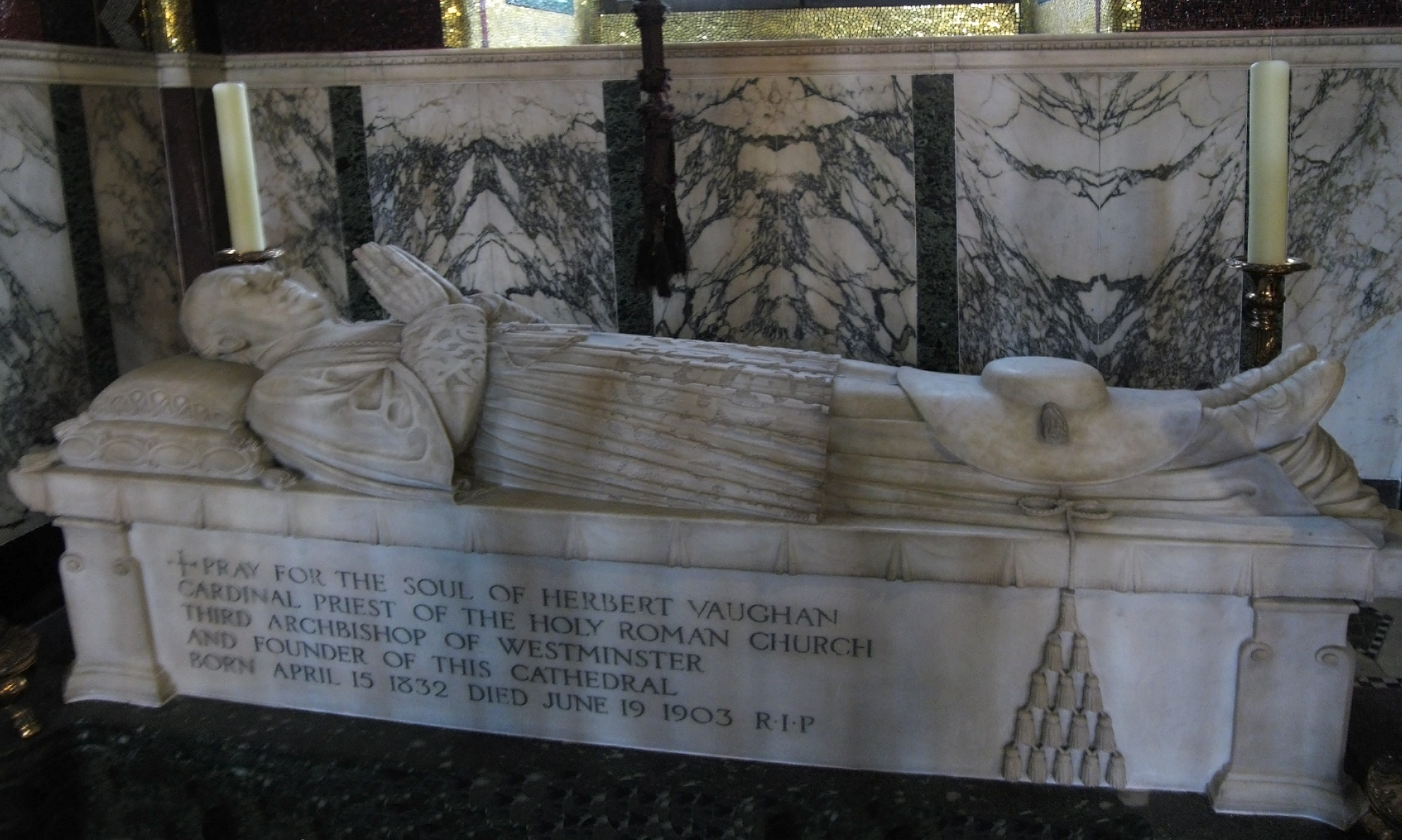
Cardinal Vaughan's tomb in the Chapel of St Thomas of Canterbury, Westminster Cathedral

It was Vaughan's most cherished ambition to see an adequate Westminster Cathedral. He worked untiringly to secure subscriptions for a capital campaign, with the result that the foundation stone for the cathedral was laid in 1895. When Vaughan died in 1903 at the age of 71, the building was so far complete that a Requiem Mass was said there. His body was interred at the cemetery of St. Joseph's College, the headquarters of the Mill Hill Missionaries in North London but it was moved back to the cathedral and reinterred in the Chapel of St Thomas of Canterbury (the "Vaughan Chantry") in 2005.

== Legacy ==
=== Founded ===
- St. Joseph Foreign Missionary College, London, United Kingdom
- St Bede's College
- St. Joseph Society of the Sacred Heart, Baltimore, MD
- Westminster Cathedral

=== Namesake ===
- In 1914, the Cardinal Vaughan Memorial School was founded in his memory in Holland Park, London.

== Published works ==
- Vaughan, Herbert Cardinal, Archbishop of Westminster (1902). The Holy Sacrifice of the Mass (Fourth ed.). St. Louis, Missouri: B. Herder.
- Vaughan, Herbert Cardinal, Archbishop of Westminster (1904). Vaughan, Msgr Canon John Stephen (ed.). The Young Priest: Conferences on the Apostolic Life. London: W: Burns and Oates Ltd.

== See also ==
- Catholic Church in Great Britain
- Bernard Vaughan, his brother – English Catholic Jesuit priest (1847–1922)

== Sources ==
- Life of Cardinal Vaughan, JG Snead Cox (2 vols., London: 1910).

Catholic Church titles
Preceded by William Turner	Bishop of Salford; 1872–1892	Succeeded by John Bilsborrow
Preceded by Henry Edward Manning	Archbishop of Westminster; 1892–1903	Succeeded by Francis Bourne
Preceded by Henry Edward Manning	Cardinal Priest of Ss. Andrea e Gregorio al Monte; 1893–1903	Succeeded by Alessandro Lualdi
