= Diocese of Hexham and Newcastle =

Latin Catholic diocese in England

Coordinates: 54.969°N 1.619°W

Diocese of Hexham and Newcastle Dioecesis Hagulstadensis et Novocastrensis

Catholic
- Coat of arms

Location
- Country: England
- Territory: Northumberland; County Durham
- Ecclesiastical province: Liverpool
- Deaneries: 18

Statistics
- Area: 8,438 km^{2} (3,258 sq mi)
- Population: Total; Catholics: (as of 2019); 2,323,200; 167,568 (7.2%)
- Parishes: 149

Information
- Denomination: Catholic Church
- Sui iuris church: Latin Church
- Rite: Roman Rite
- Established: 29 September 1850 (as Hexham); 23 May 1861 (as Hexham and Newcastle)
- Cathedral: St Mary's Cathedral
- Secular priests: 194

Current leadership
- Pope: Leo XIV
- Bishop: Stephen Wright
- Metropolitan Archbishop: John Francis Sherrington
- Vicar General: Rev. Jeff Dodds (North) Rev. Mark Millward (South)
- Episcopal Vicars: Jeff Dodds; Simon Lerche; Andrew Faley; Adrian Tuckwell; Colm Hayden
- Bishops emeritus: Robert Byrne; Séamus Cunningham

Map
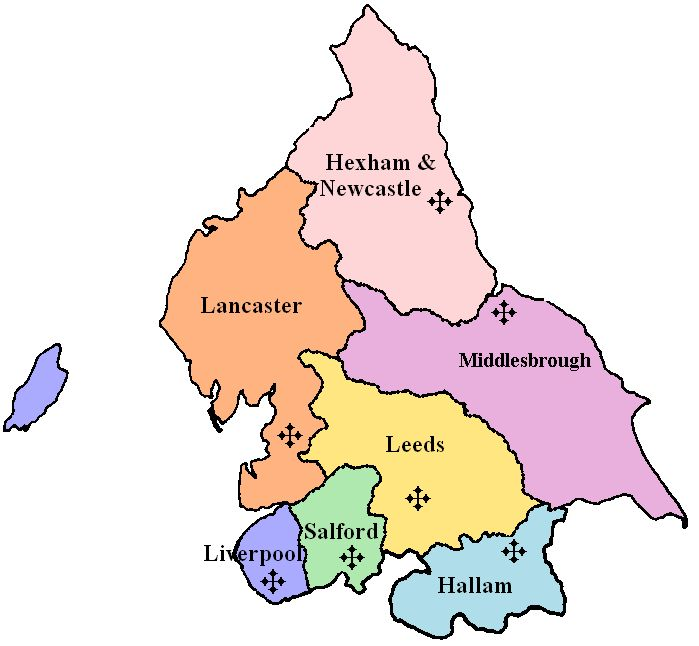
- The Diocese of Hexham and Newcastle within the Province of Liverpool

Website
- rcdhn.org.uk

The Diocese of Hexham and Newcastle (Latin: Dioecesis Hagulstadensis et Novocastrensis) is a Latin Catholic diocese of the Catholic Church, centred on St Mary's Cathedral, in the city of Newcastle upon Tyne, in England. The diocese is one of the six suffragan sees in the ecclesiastical province of Liverpool and covers the historic boundaries of County Durham and Northumberland.

== History ==
The Diocese of Hexham was revived in 1850 by decree of Pope Pius IX, restoring the Catholic hierarchy to England and Wales. Although the ancient See of Hexham was founded in 678 it had later lapsed. Together with the See of Lindisfarne, founded by Saint Aidan, Hexham formed the main part of the Northumbrian kingdom's ecclesiastical structure. Among the early bishops elected to the see in 684 was Saint Cuthbert, the present-day patron of the modern diocese and, later, Acca of Hexham.

The modern diocese was expanded to include the title of Newcastle in 1861. Originally under the metropolitan See of Westminster, the diocese became part of the new province of Liverpool (often referred to as the Northern Province) in 1911.

On the restoration of the diocese in 1850, Pius IX appointed Bishop William Hogarth, Vicar Apostolic of the Northern District, to be the first bishop of the diocese. The Parish Church of Saint Mary, Newcastle upon Tyne, designed by Augustus Welby Pugin, was selected as the seat for the new bishop, gaining cathedral status.

In 1924, Pope Pius XI withdrew the old counties of Cumberland and Westmorland to incorporate them into a newly created Diocese of Lancaster. For this reason, the Lancaster diocese still considers St Cuthbert as one of its principal patrons. Other territory was taken from the Archdiocese of Liverpool to form the new see.

== Present ==
The modern Diocese of Hexham and Newcastle comprises the counties of Northumberland, Tyne and Wear and County Durham. In this respect, it comprises three cities: Newcastle upon Tyne, Durham and Sunderland. In 2005, Bishop Dunn reorganised the structure of the diocese and curia. He introduced five episcopal areas. These areas are arranged geographically and are known as Northumberland, Newcastle and North Tyneside, Sunderland and East Durham, South Tyneside, Gateshead and North West Durham, and Cleveland and South Durham.

The diocesan curia and chancery are officially based at St Cuthbert's House, West Road, Newcastle upon Tyne, NE15 7PY.

The diocese was also home to the regional seminary for the north of England, Ushaw College, near Durham. The seminary had strong links with the University of Durham which validated the degree courses offered there. The seminary was governed by the bishops of the Northern Province under the chairmanship of the Archbishop of Liverpool. However, as the local ordinary, the Bishop of Hexham and Newcastle always held the position of vice-chairman of governors.

The diocesan patrons are Our Blessed Lady Immaculate (8 December) and Saint Cuthbert, Bishop and Confessor (20 March).

There are presently 214 diocesan priests (57 of whom are retired) and six permanent deacons serving 183 parishes. A number of religious orders are also present in the diocese, including the Passionists, the Jesuits, the Carmelites, Mill Hill Missionaries, the Poor Clares and the Sisters of Mercy.

== 21st century bishops ==
In 2004, Kevin Dunn was appointed the 12th Bishop of Hexham and Newcastle by Pope John Paul II, and was consecrated on 25 May 2004 at St Mary's Cathedral, Newcastle upon Tyne. He appointed the man who would ultimately be his successor, Canon Seamus Cunningham, as vicar general. He also appointed a new chancellor for the curia and a new episcopal vicar for religious.

Following the death of Bishop Dunn on 1 March 2008, the College of Consultors elected Canon Seamus Cunningham as the Diocesan Administrator. On 9 January 2009 it was announced that Pope Benedict XVI had appointed him to be the 13th Bishop of Hexham and Newcastle. He received his episcopal ordination on Friday, 20 March 2009 – the feast day of St. Cuthbert – the diocesan patron.

In February 2019, Robert Byrne was appointed as the 14th Bishop of Hexham and Newcastle. Three years later, in December 2022, he announced his resignation from the position and returned to the congregation at the Oxford Oratory.

The See of Hexham and Newcastle was sede vacante for a short period following Pope Francis' acceptance of the resignation of Robert Byrne in December 2022. On 14 June 2023, it was announced that Pope Francis had appointed Stephen Wright to be the 15th Bishop of Hexham and Newcastle on 14 June 2023. He was installed in St Mary's Cathedral on 19 July 2023.

== Bishops ==
=== Ordinaries ===
==== Vicars Apostolic of Northern District ====
See also Apostolic Vicariate of the Northern District (England).

- James Smith (1688–1711)
- George Witham (1716–1725)
- Thomas Dominic Williams, O.P. (1725–1740)
- Edward Dicconson (1740–1752)
- Francis Petre (1752–1775)
- William Walton (1775–1780)
- Matthew Gibson (1780–1790)
- William Gibson (1790–1821)
- Thomas Smith (1821–1831)
- Thomas Penswick (1831–1836)
- John Briggs (1836–1840), appointed Vicar Apostolic of Yorkshire District
- Henry Weedall (1840), did not take effect
- Francis George Mostyn (1840–1847)
- William Riddell (1847)
- William Hogarth (1848–1850); see below

==== Bishop of Hexham ====
See also Bishop of Hexham and Newcastle, which includes Bishop of Hexham.

- William Hogarth (1850–1861); see above & below

==== Bishops of Hexham and Newcastle ====
- William Hogarth (1861–1866); see above
- John Chadwick (1866–1882)
- John William Bewick (1882–1886)
- Henry O'Callaghan (1887–1889)
- Thomas William Wilkinson (1889–1909)
- Richard Collins (1909–1924)
- Joseph Thorman (1924–1936)
- Joseph McCormack (1936–1958)
- James Cunningham (1958–1974)
- Hugh Lindsay (1974–1992)
- Michael Ambrose Griffiths, O.S.B. (1992–2004)
- Kevin John Dunn (2004–2008)
- Séamus Cunningham (2009–2019)
- Robert John Byrne, C.O. (2019–2022)
- Stephen Wright (2023- )

=== Coadjutor Vicars Apostolic ===
- John Briggs (1833–1836)
- William Maire (1767–1769), died without succeeding to see
- Thomas Penswick (1824–1831)
- Francis Petre (1750–1752)
- William Riddell (1843–1847)
- Thomas Smith (1807–1821)
- William Walton (1770–1775)

=== Auxiliary Bishops ===
- Richard Collins (1905–1909), appointed Bishop here
- James Cunningham (1957–1958), appointed Bishop here
- Hugh Lindsay (1969–1974), appointed Bishop here
- Richard Preston (1900–1904)
- Owen Francis Swindlehurst (1977–1995), died in office
- Thomas William Wilkinson (1888–1889), appointed Bishop here

=== Other priests of this diocese who became bishops ===
- George Hilary Brown, appointed Vicar Apostolic of Lancashire District in 1840
- George Crompton Ambrose Burton, appointed Bishop of Clifton in 1902
- Robert Cornthwaite, appointed Bishop of Beverley in 1861
- John Douglass, appointed Vicar Apostolic of London District in 1790
- Charles Petre Eyre, appointed apostolic delegate and titular archbishop in 1868
- Robert Gradwell, appointed Coadjutor Vicar Apostolic of London District in 1828
- Bernard O'Reilly, appointed Bishop of Liverpool in 1873
- James Sharples, appointed Coadjutor Vicar Apostolic of Lancashire District in 1843
- Gregory Stapleton, appointed Vicar Apostolic of Midland District in 1800
- William Turner, appointed Bishop of Salford in 1851
- Nicholas Wiseman, appointed Vicar Apostolic of Midland District in 1840; future Cardinal
- George Witham, appointed Vicar Apostolic of Midland District in 1702; later returned here as Vicar Apostolic

== See also ==
- Basil Hume – Cardinal Hume was a native son of Newcastle
- Bishop of Lindisfarne
- List of Catholic churches in the United Kingdom
- Minsteracres
