= William Hogarth (bishop) =

Catholic bishop

The Right Reverend William Hogarth
- Bishop of Hexham and Newcastle
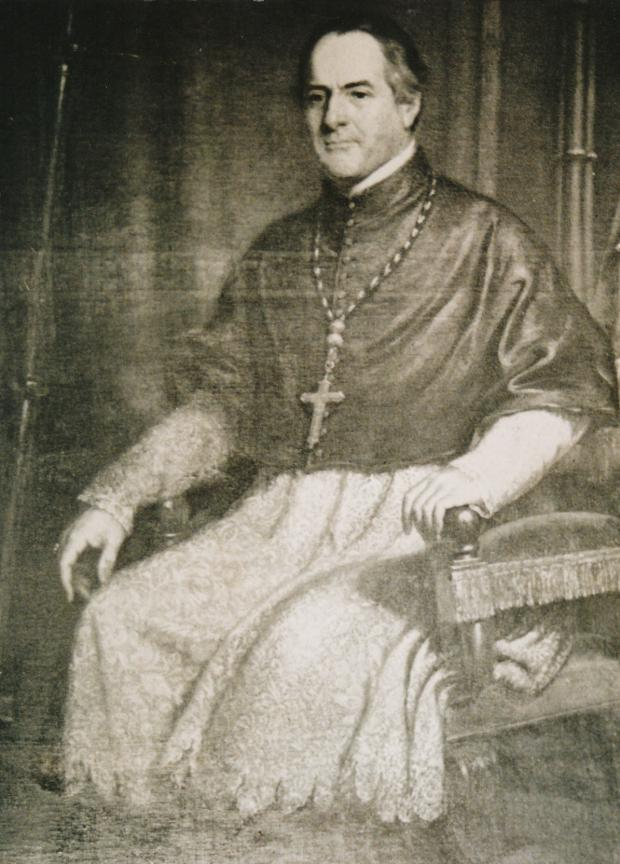
- Church: Roman Catholic Church
- Diocese: Hexham and Newcastle
- Appointed: 29 September 1850
- Term ended: 29 January 1866
- Successor: James Chadwick
- Previous posts: Vicar Apostolic of the Northern District; Titular Bishop of Samosata

Orders
- Ordination: 20 December 1809 by William Gibson
- Consecration: 24 August 1848 by John Briggs

Personal details
- Born: 25 March 1786 Dodding Green, Kendal, Westmorland
- Died: 29 January 1866 (aged 79) Darlington, County Durham
- Buried: Ushaw College cemetery
- Denomination: Roman Catholic
- Education: Ushaw College

William Hogarth (1786 – 1866) was an English prelate of the Roman Catholic Church. He was the first Bishop of Hexham and Newcastle.

== Early life and ministry ==
Born at Dodding Green, Kendal, Westmorland on 25 March 1786, he began his early education at Crook Hall, near Consett on 29 August 1796. Hogarth received the tonsure and the four minor orders from Bishop William Gibson on 19 March 1807. The hall became inadequate for its purpose and the establishment was moved to Ushaw College in 1808. He was ordained a sub-deacon on 2 April 1808, a deacon on 14 December 1808, and a priest on 20 December 1809 at Ushaw.

Following his ordination as a priest, it had been intended for Hogarth to serve the mission in Blackburn, but he was too useful to Ushaw and was made one of the professors, and became General Prefect. He left the college on 31 October 1816 to serve as the chaplain at Cliffe Hall, Cliffe in Yorkshire. After eight years, he was transferred to the mission in Darlington on 9 November 1824. He became Vicar General to bishops Briggs, Mostyn and Riddell successively.

== Episcopal career ==
He was appointed the Vicar Apostolic of the Northern District of England and Titular Bishop of Samosata on 28 July 1848. His consecration to the Episcopate took place at St Cuthbert's Chapel, Ushaw College on 24 August 1848, the principal consecrator was Bishop John Briggs, with bishops Brown and Wareing as co-consecrators.

On the restoration of the Catholic Hierarchy in England and Wales on 29 September 1850, the Northern District was elevated to the Diocese of Hexham, with William Hogarth as its first bishop. He was one of the first restored Hierarchy to sign a public document with the title "William, bishop of Hexham" in defiance of the threatened consequencies of the Ecclesiastical Titles Act 1851. His episcopal title was changed on 23 May 1861 to Bishop of Hexham and Newcastle when it was decreed that St Mary's Cathedral, Newcastle upon Tyne should be the bishop's seat, and the Episcopal see should be renamed the Diocese of Hexham and Newcastle.

He died in office at Darlington on 29 January 1866, aged 79. A Requiem Mass was held at St Augustine's Church, Darlington on 1 February 1866, followed by his burial at Ushaw College cemetery on 6 February 1866.

== Bibliography ==
- Brady, W. Maziere (1876). The Episcopal Succession in England, Scotland and Ireland, A.D. 1400 to 1875. Vol. 3. Rome: Tipografia Della Pace.

Catholic Church titles
Preceded by William Riddell	Vicar Apostolic of the Northern District; 1848–1850	Erection of Roman hierarchy
New title	Bishop of Hexham; 1850–1861	Succeeded by Himself as Bishop of Hexham and Newcastle
Preceded by Himself as Bishop of Hexham	Bishop of Hexham and Newcastle; 1861–1866	Succeeded by James Chadwick
