= St Mary's Church, Sunderland =

St Mary's Church
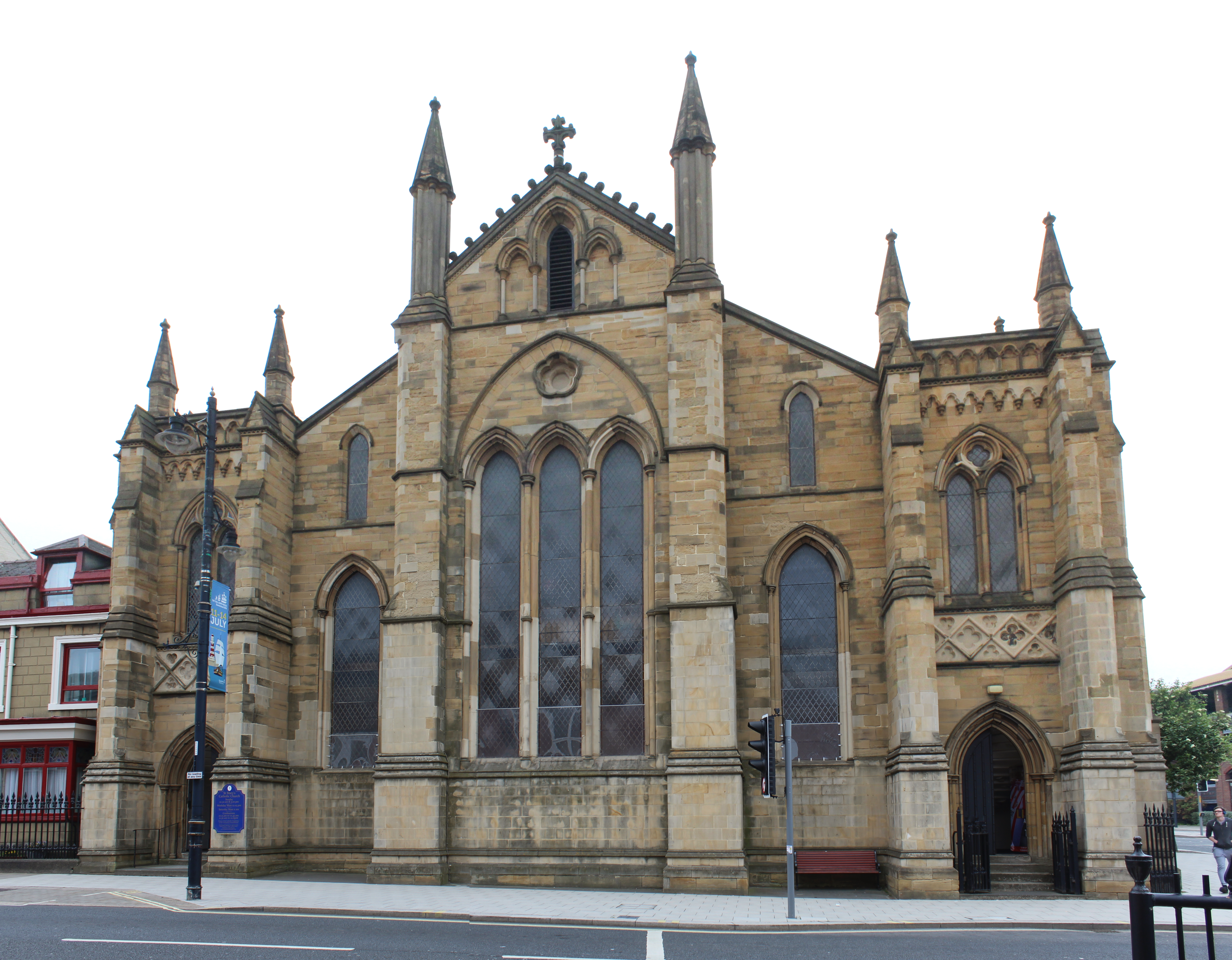
- Church entrance
- St Mary's Church
- 54.9082°N 1.3827°W
- OS grid reference: NZ 39678 57227
- Location: Sunderland
- Country: England
- Denomination: Roman Catholic
- Website: Parish website

History
- Status: Active
- Dedication: Blessed Virgin Mary

Architecture
- Functional status: Parish church
- Heritage designation: Grade II listed
- Designated: 8 May 1950
- Architect: Ignatius Bonomi
- Style: Gothic Revival
- Groundbreaking: 1830
- Completed: 15 September 1835

Administration
- Province: Liverpool
- Diocese: Hexham and Newcastle
- Deanery: St Bede, Sunderland

St Mary's Church is a Roman Catholic parish church in the city centre of Sunderland, Tyne and Wear, situated on the corner of Bridge Street and St Mary's Way. It is a Grade II listed building, designed by Ignatius Bonomi. Built from 1830 to 1835, and is the earliest Gothic revival church surviving in Sunderland.

== History ==
=== Construction ===
In 1830, Ignatius Bonomi submitted designs for the church to have a capacity of 1200 people. On 15 September 1835, the church was opened by the Apostolic Vicar of the Northern District, John Briggs.

By 1851, the population of Sunderland had grown and it was estimated that there were at least 4000 Catholics living in the city. In 1852, two side chapels were added to the church to accommodate the growing congregation. Bonomi had allowed for such an expansion in his initial designs.

In 1937, an organ was added to the church. It was acquired from the Rex Theatre in South Shields and refurbished in 1992.

=== World War II ===
In March and May 1943, the church was damaged by air raids. The main roof was damaged and had to be rebuilt. Also, the majority of the church's stained glass was destroyed. In 1946 and 1947, the stained glass was replaced. The new glass cost £1000 and was bought from a firm one called Jansen & Co. from the Netherlands. Jansens & Co. also redecorated the altars and the stations of the cross. On 24 September 1947, after the repairs were complete and the church was consecrated by the Bishop of Hexham and Newcastle, Joseph McCormack.

=== Reordering ===
In 1982 the church was reordered as part of the liturgical changes of the Second Vatican Council. The pulpit and altar rails were removed and a new altar was bought and brought forward. The altar in the Lady Chapel was removed, leaving the reredos of the Annunciation in place. The stations of the cross were temporarily moved to the back of the church and many statues removed. The church redecorated and a new heating system was installed. A narthex was also made. The total cost of these works came to roughly £130,000. On 16 April 1982, the new altar was consecrated by Bishop Owen Swindlehurst. From 2002 to 2003, the church was again repaired and redecorated.

== Parish ==
The church has two Masses every Sunday: 10:30am and 5:00pm.

== See also ==
- Roman Catholic Diocese of Hexham and Newcastle
