= St Bede's Church, South Shields =

Coordinates: 54.9936°N 1.4294°W

St Bede's Church
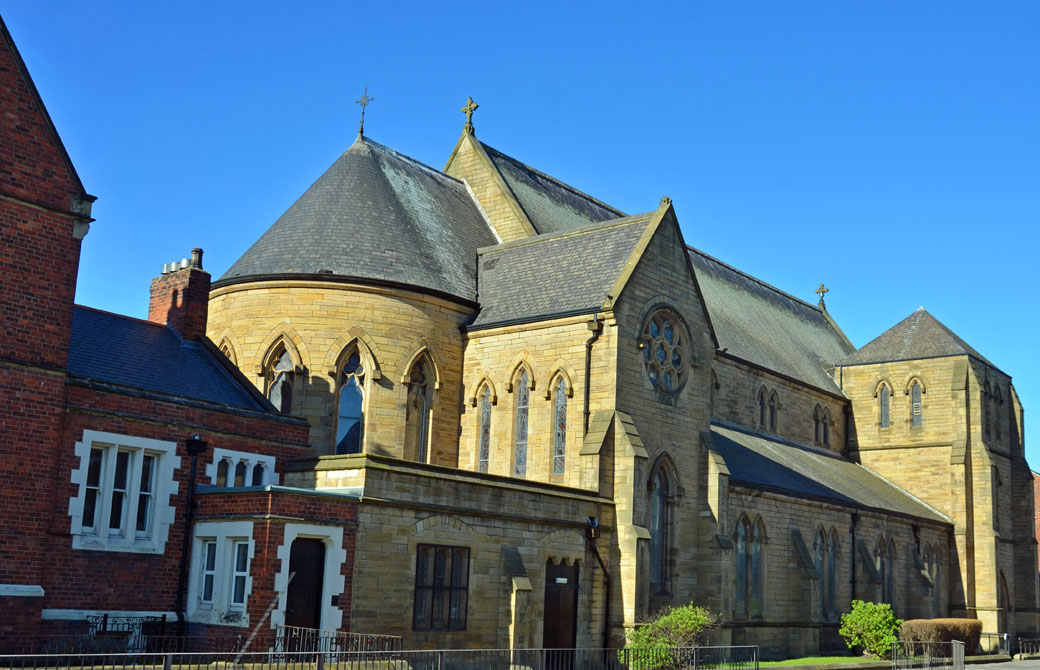
- St Bede's Church
- OS grid reference: NZ 36605 66707
- Location: South Shields
- Country: England
- Denomination: Roman Catholic
- Website: Official website

History
- Status: Active
- Founder: Canon Waterton
- Dedication: Bede

Architecture
- Functional status: Parish church
- Heritage designation: Grade II listed
- Designated: 31 August 2016
- Architect(s): Thomas Cooke Nicholson; Gibson Lidbetter
- Style: Gothic Revival
- Groundbreaking: 27 May 1874
- Completed: 22 August 1876
- Construction cost: 11,000

Administration
- Province: Liverpool
- Diocese: Hexham and Newcastle
- Deanery: Bede - South Tyneside
- Parish: St Bede and Ss Peter & Paul

St Bede's Church is a Catholic parish church in South Shields, South Tyneside, Tyne and Wear, England. It was built from 1874 to 1876 in the Gothic Revival style of architecture. It is located on Westoe Road, south of Crossgate near the town centre. In 2016 it was designated a Grade II listed building.

== History ==
=== Foundation ===
In the first half of the 19th century, the Catholics in South Shields had to travel to North Shields to go to Mass. St Cuthbert's Church there was the closest church to them at the time (it was demolished and rebuilt in the 1970s). In 1832, a Sunday school was started in the Mill Dam area of the town. On 4 December 1849, St Cuthbert's Church in South Shields was opened. It was on Western Approach and the building was a former protestant chapel. It was opened by Bishop William Hogarth, the Apostolic Vicar of the Northern District. He became the first Bishop of Hexham and Newcastle the following year. Later a school and a presbytery were added to the church.

=== Construction ===
By the early 1870s, St Cuthbert's Church had become too small to accommodate its congregation. The site of the current church on Westoe Street was purchased by the priest Canon Waterton. On 27 May 1874, the foundation stone of St Bede's Church was laid. The architect was recorded by Nikolaus Pevsner in The Buildings of England as being Gibson Lidbetter under the supervision of Thomas Cooke Nicholson. On 22 August 1876, the church was opened. Construction work was delayed because of problems with laying the foundations on quicksand. That foundation work also increased the cost of constructing the church. Initially, the cost of building the church was supposed to be around £8,000, but it increased to £11,000. On 14 September 1949, the costs of the church were finally paid off and the church was consecrated by Bishop Joseph McCormack of Hexham and Newcastle.

=== Developments ===
In 1913, a new parish school was built on Derby Street. In 1971, the school was replaced by the current primary school. Also in 1971, the parish hall opened. It was on the site of the former Marsden Miners’ Hall. Later, the parish hall was moved into the renovated and enlarged presbytery basement. In 1965, the church was refurbished, and again in 1972.

== Parish ==
St Bede’s Catholic Primary School is located in the parish, adjacent to west of the church. St Bede's Church is in the same parish as Ss Peter and Paul Church. St Bede's Church has two Sunday Masses at 5:00 pm on Saturday and at 9:30 am on Sunday. Ss Peter and Paul Church has its Sunday Mass at 11:00 am.

== See also ==
- Diocese of Hexham and Newcastle
