= St Mary's Church, Stockton-on-Tees =

St Mary's Church
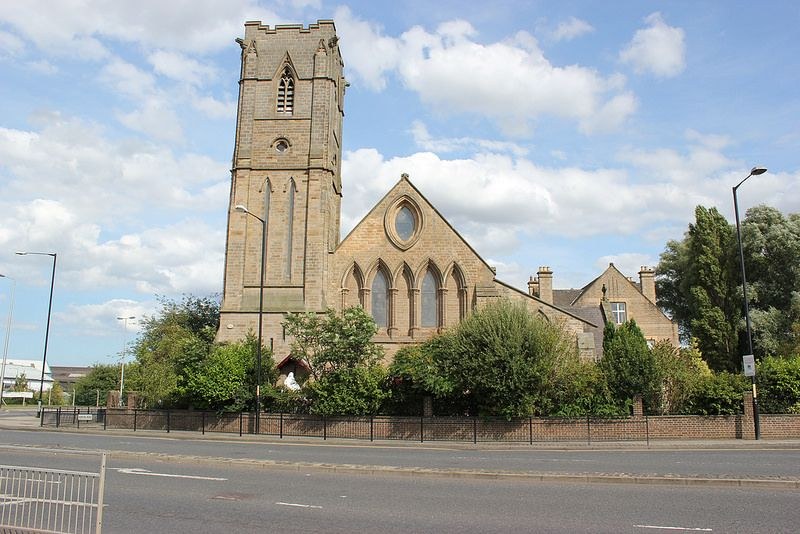
- St Mary's Church
- 54.5709°N 1.3117°W
- OS grid reference: NZ 44597 19736
- Location: Stockton-on-Tees
- Country: England
- Denomination: Roman Catholic
- Website: Official website

History
- Status: Parish church
- Founded: 1842
- Founder: Fr Joseph Dugdale
- Dedication: Saint Mary

Architecture
- Functional status: Active
- Heritage designation: Grade II listed
- Designated: 19 January 1951
- Architect(s): Augustus Pugin, George Goldie, Charles Hadfield
- Style: Gothic Revival
- Completed: 7 July 1842

Administration
- Province: Liverpool
- Diocese: Hexham and Newcastle
- Deanery: St Hilda
- Parish: St Mary

St Mary's Church is a Roman Catholic parish church in Stockton-on-Tees, County Durham, England. It was built in 1842 and designed by Augustus Pugin in the Gothic Revival style. According to Historic England, the current building was the first permanent Roman Catholic church to be built in Teesside since the Reformation. It is located in the town centre, on the corner of Norton Road and Major Street, with the A1305 road to the north of it. It is a Grade II listed building.

== History ==
=== Construction ===
In 1790, a Catholic chapel was built in Stockton-on-Tees. From the chapel the local Catholic population was served by a Catholic mission founded by a Fr Joseph Dugdale. With the increasing Catholic population, he decided that a new larger church was needed. He sought Augustus Pugin as architect to build the church. On 7 July 1842, the present church was opened by Bishop Francis Mostyn, the Apostolic Vicariate of the Northern District.

In 1866, the north aisle and the lower part of the tower was added. They cost £1,300. In 1870, the south aisle and sanctuary were added. They were designed by George Goldie and cost £4,000. In 1909, the upper part of the tower and the presbytery were added. They were designed by Charles Hadfield, son of Matthew Ellison Hadfield. In 1970, the sanctuary was reordered and the roof was replaced.

=== Developments ===
St Mary's Church was the only Catholic church in Stockton-on-Tees until the 20th century. With the town and local Catholic population increasing, missions were started from St Mary's Church to serve other parts of Stockton-on-Tees. In 1908, a mission was started in the south of Stockton-on-Tees, resulting in a wooden church being built on the corner of Yarm Road and Spring Street. A permanent church was built on the same site, and on 8 July 1958, St Cuthbert's Church was opened.

Before 1933, the Catholics in Norton went to St Mary's Church for Mass. In the 1920s, plans were made to construct a church there. In 1926, the Bishop of Hexham and Newcastle, Joseph Thorman bought Ragworth Hall and four acres of land from the Ropner family in Norton for the future construction of a church and a school. Mass was first said in Norton in 1933 in the library of Ragworth Hall by a Fr Thornton, the first parish priest. St Joseph’s Church was built on the site of its stables and coach house. In 1933, St Joseph’s Church was opened.

In the 1950s, the population and town continued to grow and St Mary's Church was not large enough to accommodate the expanding congregation. In 1951, St Bede's Church was built on Bishopton Road, and in 1956, Saints Peter and Paul Church was built to serve the area around Roseworth. On 19 September 1956, Saints Peter and Paul church was opened, it cost £24,000 and had a capacity of around 600 people. In 2010, English Martyrs Church was closed and the two parishes were combined to become English Martyrs and Saints Peter and Paul Parish. In 1967, the parish of St Patrick was created for Fairfield. In 1973, the church was built.

== Parish ==
The parish of St Mary's Church, along with the parishes of English Martyrs and Saints Peter and Paul Church, St Bede's Church, St Cuthbert's Church, St Joseph's Church, and St Patrick's Church, all in Stockton-on Tees are in the St Hilda Partnership. St Mary's Church has one Sunday Mass at 6:00pm, English Martyrs and Saints Peter and Paul Church has its Sunday Mass at 6:00pm on Saturday. St Bede's Church has its Sunday Mass at 4:30pm on Saturday. St Cuthbert's Church has its Sunday Mass at 11:00am. St Joseph's Church has its Sunday Mass at 10:30am. St Patrick's Church has its Sunday Mass at 9:00am.

== Exterior ==
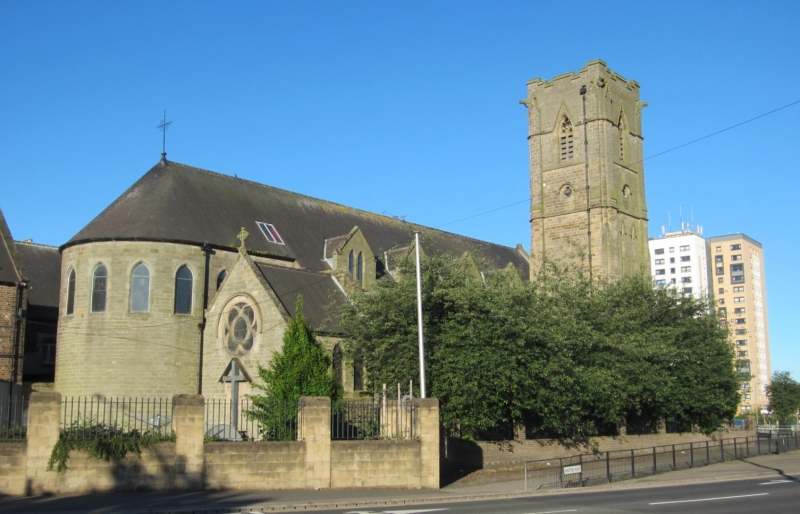
Side of church

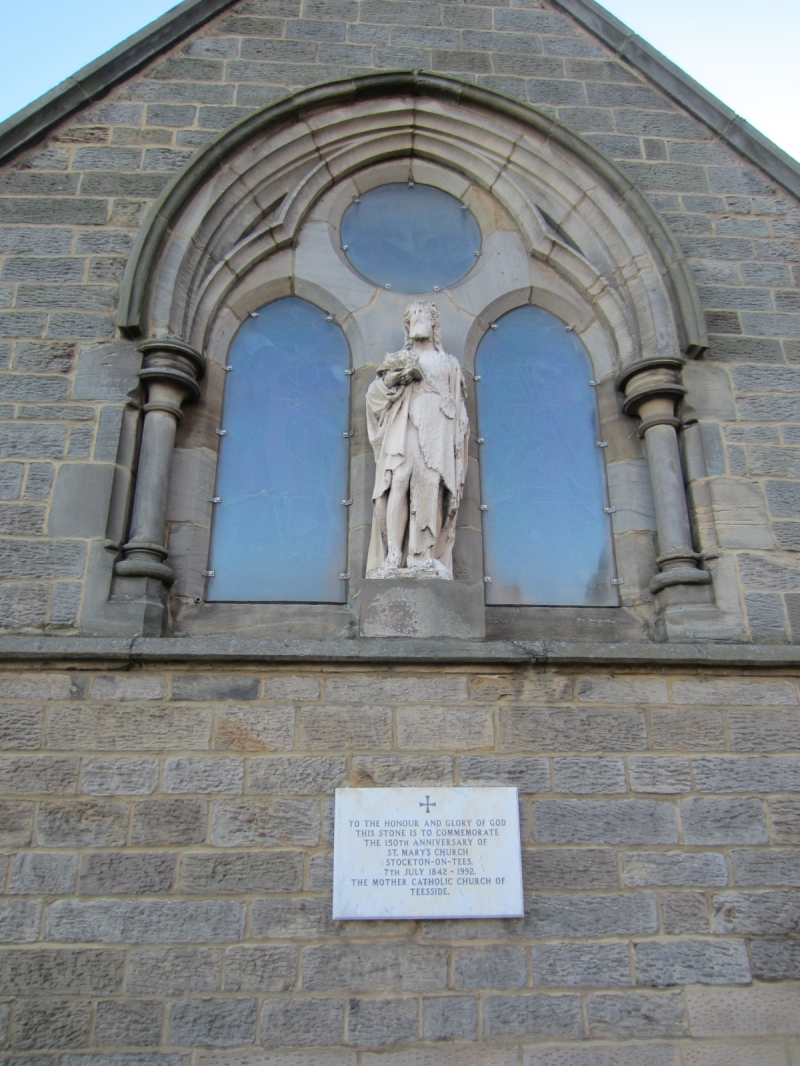
Statue and plaque

== See also ==
- Media related to St Mary's Church, Stockton-on-Tees at Wikimedia Commons
- Diocese of Hexham and Newcastle
