= St Cuthbert's High School =

St Cuthbert's Catholic High School

Location
- Gretna Road; Newcastle upon Tyne, NE15 7PX; England; 54°58′44″N 1°40′31″W

Information
- Type: academy
- Motto: Quies In Caelo
- Religious affiliation: Roman Catholic
- Established: 1881
- Founder: Bishop James Chadwick
- Local authority: Newcastle upon Tyne
- Department for Education URN: 137900 Tables
- Ofsted: Reports
- Principal: Daniel P. Murray
- Staff: c.75
- Gender: Boys
- Age: 11 to 18
- Enrolment: 1207
- Colours: Maroon, Gold and Pale Blue
- Diocese: Hexham and Newcastle
- Website: http://www.st-cuthbertshigh.newcastle.sch.uk

St Cuthbert's Catholic High School (formerly St Cuthbert's Catholic Grammar School) is a boys-only Roman Catholic secondary school with academy status located on Gretna Road in Newcastle upon Tyne, England.

== Admissions ==
St Cuthbert's is a seven-form entry school. The school admits students of all faiths, but Roman Catholic children take priority.

== History ==
St Cuthbert's Grammar School was opened at 62–64 Westmorland Road, Elswick, Newcastle upon Tyne, on 16 August 1881, largely due to the efforts of Bishop James Chadwick and his successor Bishop John Bewick building upon the foundations of the Catholic Collegiate School established in 1870 in Eldon Square. Shortly afterward the School moved to larger premises in Bath Lane in the centre of the city. The aim for the school was to act as a feeder for Ushaw College and to equip Catholic boys of the city with a standard of education previously only available to their non-Catholic counterparts.

In 1922 the School transferred to the present site on Gretna Road. Part of the school (1922 Block – now demolished) was built directly over the Vallum (rear ditch) of Hadrian's Wall. During WWII, boys were evacuated to Cockermouth in what is now Cumbria. In 2011 the School again became single site on the completion of the Building Schools for the Future work, the former Lower School buildings on Fox & Hounds Lane having been demolished.

It was a direct grant grammar school until September 1977, then began to take a comprehensive intake.

The school converted to academy status in March 2012.

=== Principals ===
Since 1881 there have been seven clergymen as head:

- Canon Wickwar
- Fr. Magill
- Monsignor Horace Kinder Mann
- Monsignor Jeffrey
- Monsignor Canon Cunningham
- Canon M. Cassidy,
- Fr. M. Walsh

and three lay headteachers:

- Mr E. Lovell
- Mr J. G Murphy
- Mrs C. Davison

The incumbent is Daniel P. Murray.

== Academic statistics ==
St Cuthbert's was ranked 662nd in the 2008 Financial Times "Top 1,000 Schools" report, placing 17th out of the 34 North East schools that made the list.

== Notable alumni ==
- Dominic Bruce, Second World War escapee, the 'medium-sized man' of Colditz Castle
- Declan Donnelly, television presenter
- Nigel Essenhigh, First Sea Lord from 2001 to 2002 of the Royal Navy
- Terry Farrell, architect
- James Garbutt, actor (When the Boat Comes In)
- Paul Kennedy, historian and writer
- Hugh Lindsay, bishop of Hexham and Newcastle
- Lawrie McMenemy, football coach
- Michael Ndiweni, footballer
- Gordon Sumner (Sting), bass player and singer in The Police and solo artist
- Neil Tennant, singer in the band Pet Shop Boys
- Tom Tuohy, put out the Windscale fire in 1957
