= Apostolic Vicariate of the Northern District =

The Vicariate Apostolic of the Northern District may refer to:

- Apostolic Vicariate of the Northern District (England), a precursor name for the Roman Catholic Diocese of Hexham and Newcastle.
- Apostolic Vicariate of the Northern District (Scotland), a precursor name for the restored Roman Catholic Diocese of Aberdeen.
