= George Brown (bishop of Liverpool) =

English prelate

The Right Reverend George Hilary Brown
- Bishop of Liverpool
- Church: Roman Catholic Church
- Diocese: Diocese of Liverpool
- Appointed: 29 September 1850
- Term ended: 25 January 1856
- Successor: Alexander Goss
- Previous post: Vicar Apostolic of the Lancashire District

Orders
- Ordination: 13 June 1810 (priest) by William Gibson
- Consecration: 24 August 1840 (bishop) by John Briggs

Personal details
- Born: 15 January 1784 Clifton, Lancashire, England
- Died: 25 September 1856 (aged 72) Liverpool, England
- Buried: St Oswald's Church, Old Swan, Liverpool
- Denomination: Roman Catholic
- Parents: William Brown and Helen Brown (née Gradwell)

George Hilary Brown (1784 – 1856) was an English prelate who served as the first Roman Catholic Bishop of Liverpool from 1850 to 1856.

== Early life ==
George Hilary Brown was born in Clifton, Lancashire on 15 January 1784, the son of William Brown and Helen Brown (née Gradwell). His first cousin was Robert Gradwell, Vicar Apostolic of the London District. George entered St Cuthbert's College, Ushaw on 25 September 1799, and received the Tonsure, the four Minor Orders, and the sub-diaconate, at Ushaw, on 2 April 1808, from Bishop William Gibson, Vicar Apostolic of the Northern District. By the same bishop, he was ordained, at Ushaw, a deacon on 14 December 1809 and a priest on 13 June 1810. He left Ushaw College on 8 April 1819, and took charge of the mission at Lancaster until he was nominated to the Lancashire Vicariate.

== Episcopal career ==
He was appointed Vicar Apostolic of the Lancashire District and Titular Bishop of Bugia on 5 June 1840, and consecrated to the Episcopate at Vauxhall, Liverpool on 24 August 1840. The principal consecrator was Bishop John Briggs, and the principal co-consecrators were Bishop Thomas Griffiths and Bishop Thomas Walsh. His titular see was translated from Bugia to Tlos on 22 April 1842.

On 29 September 1850, the hierarchy was restored in England and Wales by Pope Pius IX. On that same day, the Lancashire Vicariate was replaced by the dioceses of Liverpool and Salford. George Hilary Brown was appointed the first Bishop of Liverpool, and Apostolic Administrator of Salford.

He died at Litherland near Liverpool on 25 January 1856, aged 72, and was buried at St Oswald's Church, Old Swan, Liverpool.

== Bibliography ==
- Brady, W. Maziere (1876). The Episcopal Succession in England, Scotland and Ireland, A.D. 1400 to 1875. Vol. 3. Rome: Tipografia Della Pace.
- Cooper, Thompson (1886). "Brown, George Hilary" . In Stephen, Leslie (ed.). Dictionary of National Biography. Vol. 7. London: Smith, Elder & Co.

Catholic Church titles
New title	Vicar Apostolic of the Lancashire District; 1840–1850	Last appointment
New title	Bishop of Liverpool; 1850–1856	Succeeded by Alexander Goss
