= Maire (surname) =

Maire is a surname. Notable people with the surname include:

- Arnaud Maire (born 1979), French footballer
- Edmond Maire (1931–2017), French labor union leader
- Edouard-Ernest Maire (1848–1932), French missionary and plant collector
- John Maire (1703–1771), English Roman Catholic conveyancer
- Nathalie Maire (died 1987), French murder victim
- René Maire (1878—1949), French botanist and mycologist
- William Maire (1704–1769), English prelate of the Roman Catholic Church
