= Francis Mostyn =

Francis Mostyn may refer to:

- Francis Mostyn (archbishop of Cardiff) (1860–1939), Roman Catholic prelate
- Francis Mostyn (vicar apostolic of the Northern District) (1800–1847), Roman Catholic prelate
