= James Cunningham (bishop) =

English prelate

James Cunningham (15 August 1910 – 10 July 1974) was an English prelate of the Roman Catholic Church. He served as Bishop of Hexham and Newcastle from 1958 to 1974.

== Early life ==
Born in Rusholme, Manchester on 15 August 1910, the son of Patrick William Cunningham and Elizabeth Maye, his father was a native of Sligo. The family owned and operated a laundry business at Nelson Street, Rusholme. Cunningham was educated at St Edward's Catholic Elementary School, and St Joseph's College, Upholland where he was ordained to the priesthood on 22 May 1937.

== Early Ministry ==
Following ordination, Fr Cunningham was sent to the Beda College, Rome to study for a Licentiate of Canon Law, he then attended the Gregorian University before being recalled to the Diocese of Salford in 1940 when he was appointed curate at Salford Cathedral, from 1941 he also served as Secretary to Bishop Henry Marshall. In 1953 he was appointed as Dean of Salford Cathedral, Vicar General of the Diocese and Monsignor.

== Episcopate ==
Mgr Cunningham was appointed an auxiliary bishop of Hexham and Newcastle and Titular Bishop of Ios on 19 August 1957. His consecration to the Episcopate took place on 2 November 1957, the principal consecrator was Archbishop John Carmel Heenan of Liverpool (later Archbishop of Westminster), and the principal co-consecrators were Bishop George Andrew Beck of Salford (later Archbishop of Liverpool) and Bishop George Brunner of Middlesbrough. The following year, Cunningham was appointed the Bishop of the Diocese of Hexham and Newcastle on 1 July 1958.

He died in office in Newcastle upon Tyne on 10 July 1974, aged 63, and was buried at Ushaw College cemetery.

Catholic Church titles
Preceded by Joseph McCormack	Bishop of Hexham and Newcastle; 1958–1974	Succeeded by Hugh Lindsay
