= James Chadwick (bishop) =

Anglo-Irish Roman Catholic priest

James Chadwick (24 April 1813 at Drogheda, Ireland – 14 May 1882 at Newcastle-upon-Tyne, and buried at Ushaw) was an Anglo-Irish Roman Catholic priest, and second Bishop of Hexham and Newcastle. He is famous for writing the lyrics of the song Angels We Have Heard on High.

== Early life and Ireland ==
James Chadwick was the third son of a gentleman of an old Catholic Lancashire family, John Chadwick, who had settled in Ireland, and his wife, an Irish lady named Frances Dromgoole. His father was fined and imprisoned for siding with Prince Charles in 1745. His mother was from a Catholic family that suffered persecution. His great-uncle was John Chadwick, vicar-general to William Walton, Vicar Apostolic of the Northern District from 1775 to 1780.

The Chadwick's of Drogheda were a prosperous family, owning a substantial flax mill and linen manufacturing business and were one of the largest employers in the town. They owned several large linen mills in Drogheda and resided in large country homes in Mornington outside the town. The Chadwick's played an active role in the community as both major employers and as sponsors of the local catholic church. They funded the building of the new Augustinian Church, in Drogheda. Chadwick would retain close ties with his family throughout his life officiating at his niece's wedding in Mornington Church.

== Career ==
Chadwick was educated at Ushaw College from May, 1825, until his ordination as priest on 17 December 1836. He then was general prefect at the college for three years, after which he taught humanities until he was appointed professor of philosophy, a post he occupied for five years.

In 1849, he became vice-president of the college and professor of dogmatic theology. After a few months his health broke down, and he found the change he needed among a little body of secular priests who devoted themselves to preaching missions and retreats. In 1856 their house at Wooler was burnt, and Father Chadwick returned once more to Ushaw as professor of philosophy.

From 1859 to 1863 he was chaplain to Lord Stourton. The Catholic population at Stourton was small and scattered, and the work not overtaxing. Alexander Goss, Bishop of Liverpool wrote Chadwick urging him to put his talents to better use, even offering an appointment to the seaside resort of Southport, but Chadwick returned to Ushaw as professor of pastoral theology. He was fulfilling these duties when he was elected bishop of the diocese in 1866; he was consecrated 28 October in the college chapel by Archbishop Manning. For sixteen years he ruled the diocese and for one year during that time (1877) he also held the dignity of president of Ushaw, being the eighth in that office. On 7 June 1867, he was named an Assistant to the Papal throne.

Chadwick is remembered as a man of great personal dignity and charm, and for his gentleness of manner. He died in Newcastle on 14 May 1882, and was buried at Ushaw.

== Works ==
His works include:

- The lyrics of Angels We Have Heard on High were written to a slightly modified version of the music of French traditional song Les Anges dans nos campagnes (literally translating to 'The Angels in our Countryside'). Chadwick's lyrics are clearly inspired but are not a direct translation of the song, though there are similarities. It is considered a derivative work.
- an edition of Leuthner's "Coelum Christianum" (London, 1871);
- "St. Teresa's Own Words: Instructions on the Prayer of Recollection" (Newcastle, 1878);
- "Instructions How to Meditate" (published anonymously),

and many pastoral letters.

Catholic Church titles
Preceded by William Hogarth	Bishop of Hexham and Newcastle; 1866–1882	Succeeded by John William Bewick
