= Richard Collins (bishop) =

British prelate (1857–1924)

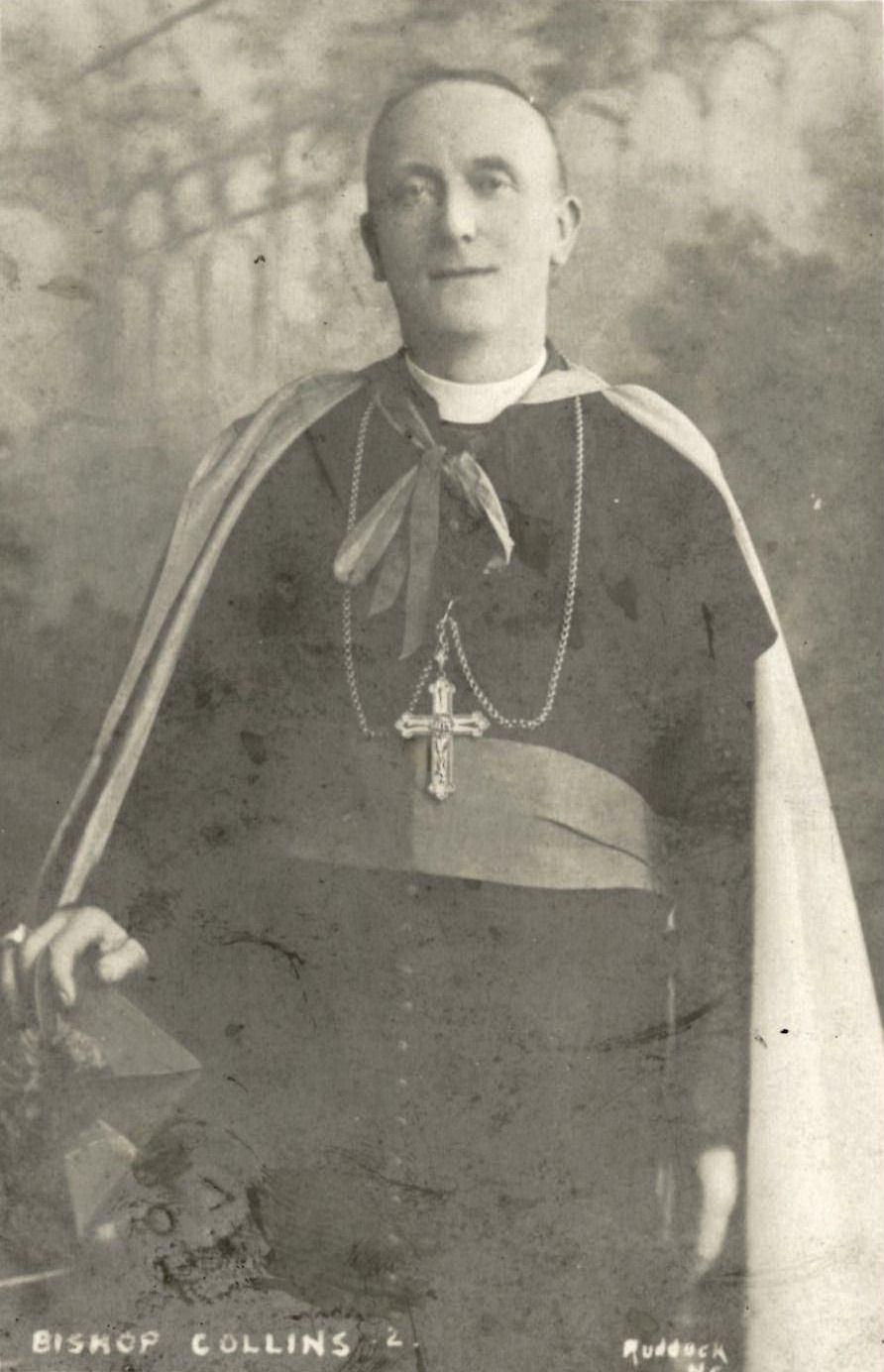
Richard Collins

Richard Collins (5 April 1857 – 9 February 1924) was a British prelate of the Roman Catholic Church. He served as Bishop of Hexham and Newcastle from 1909 to 1924.

== Life ==
Born in Newbury, Berkshire on 5 April 1857, he was ordained to the priesthood on 30 May 1885. He was appointed an auxiliary bishop of Hexham and Newcastle and Titular Bishop of Selinus on 31 March 1905. His consecration to the Episcopate took place on 29 June 1905, the principal consecrator was Cardinal Francis Bourne, Archbishop of Westminster, and the principal co-consecrators were Bishop Francis Mostyn of Menevia and Bishop George Burton of Clifton. Four years later, Collins was appointed Bishop of Hexham and Newcastle on 21 June 1909.

He died in office in Newcastle upon Tyne on 9 February 1924, aged 66, and buried at Ushaw College cemetery.

Catholic Church titles
Preceded by Thomas William Wilkinson	Bishop of Hexham and Newcastle; 1909–1924	Succeeded by Joseph Thorman
