= William Riddell =

The Right Reverend William Riddell
- Vicar Apostolic of the Northern District
- Church: Roman Catholic Church
- Appointed: 11 August 1847
- Term ended: 2 November 1847
- Predecessor: Francis George Mostyn
- Successor: William Hogarth
- Other post: Titular Bishop of Lagania
- Previous post: Coadjutor to the Vicar Apostolic of the Northern District

Orders
- Ordination: March 1830 (priest)
- Consecration: 17 March 1844 (bishop) by John Briggs

Personal details
- Born: 5 February 1807 Felton Park, near Morpeth, Northumberland
- Died: 2 November 1847 (aged 40) Charlotte Street, Newcastle upon Tyne
- Buried: St Mary's Cathedral, Newcastle upon Tyne
- Denomination: Roman Catholic
- Parents: Ralph Riddell and Elizabeth Blount
- Education: Stonyhurst College; English College, Rome

William Riddell (1807–1847) was a Roman Catholic bishop who briefly served as the Vicar Apostolic of the Northern District of England in 1847.

== Early life and ministry ==
He was born at Felton Park, near Morpeth, Northumberland, England on 5 February 1807, the son of Ralph Riddell and Elizabeth Blount. He began his education at Stonyhurst College in Lancashire on 21 September 1817, and then to the English College, Rome on 29 November 1823, where he completed his theological studies. He was ordained a sub-deacon on 22 March 1828, a deacon in August 1829, and a priest in March 1830. After leaving Rome for England on 1 August 1830, he had a brief period as secretary to Cardinal Weld. In June 1832, he began as an assistant in the mission in Newcastle upon Tyne, and subsequently taking charge of the mission.

== Vicar Apostolic ==
He was appointed coadjutor to the Vicar Apostolic of the Northern District, Bishop Francis George Mostyn, on 22 December 1843. On the same day, he was appointed Titular Bishop of Lagania, and was consecrated to the Episcopate by Bishop John Briggs on 17 March 1844. On the death of Bishop Mostyn on 11 August 1847, Riddell briefly succeeded as Vicar Apostolic of the Northern District.

He died in office at Charlotte Street, Newcastle upon Tyne on 2 November 1847, aged 40, of typhus contracted while ministering to the victims of an epidemic, and is buried in the vaults of St Mary's Cathedral, Newcastle upon Tyne.

== Bibliography ==
- Brady, W. Maziere (1876). The Episcopal Succession in England, Scotland and Ireland, A.D. 1400 to 1875. Vol. 3. Rome: Tipografia Della Pace.

Catholic Church titles
Preceded by Francis George Mostyn	Vicar Apostolic of the Northern District; August–November 1847	Succeeded by William Hogarth
