= Universalis Ecclesiae =

1850 papal bull by Pope Pius IX

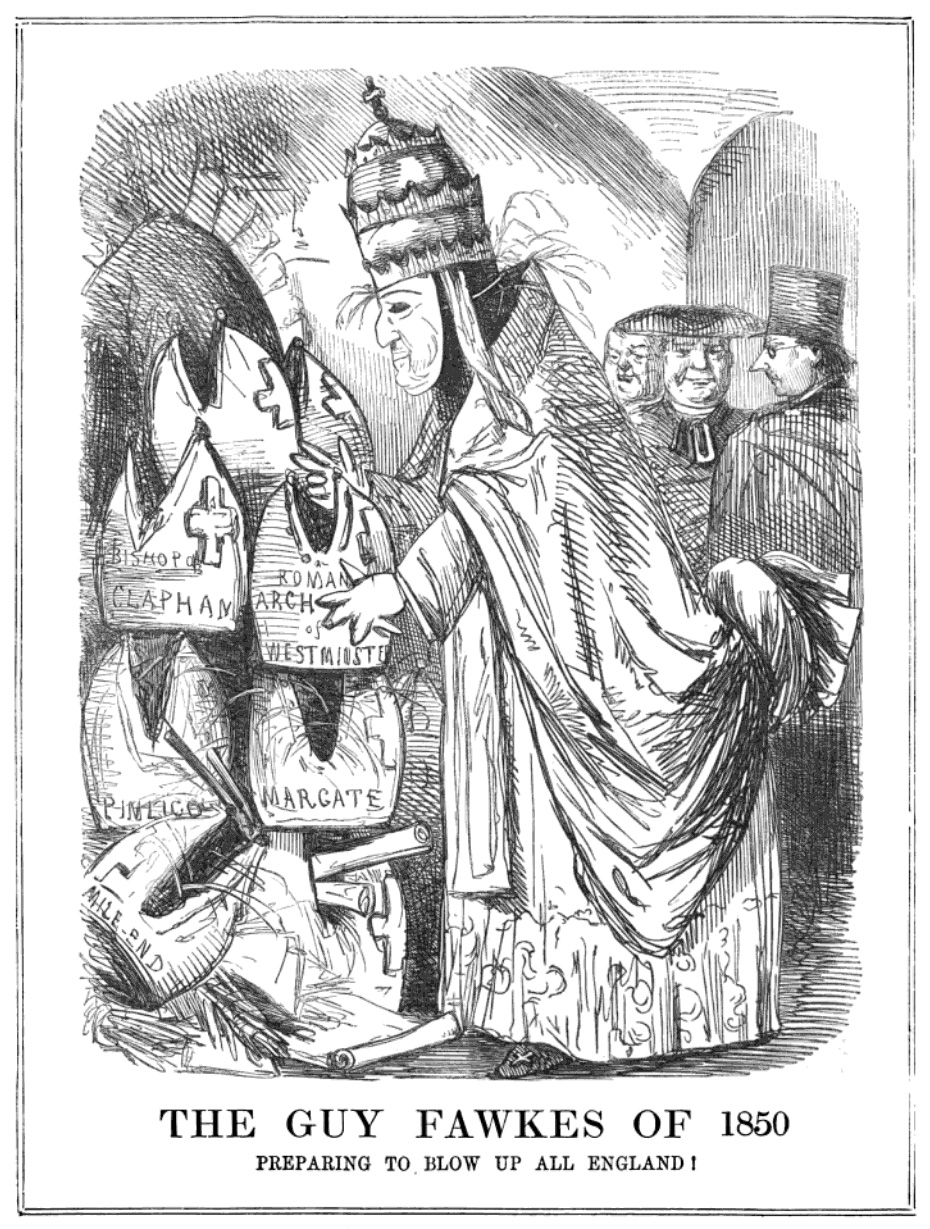
The restoration of the Catholic hierarchy in England in 1850 provoked strong reaction. This Punch cartoon, published in November of that year, depicts the Pope as "The Guy Fawkes of 1850 – preparing to blow up all England!"

Universalis Ecclesiae was a papal bull of 29 September 1850 by which Pope Pius IX recreated the Roman Catholic diocesan hierarchy in England, which had been extinguished with the death of the last Marian bishop in the reign of Elizabeth I. New names were given to the dioceses, as the old ones were in use by the Church of England. The bull aroused considerable anti-Catholic feeling among English Protestants.

== History ==
When Catholics in England were deprived of the normal episcopal hierarchy, their general pastoral care was entrusted at first to a priest with the title of archpriest (in effect an apostolic prefect), and then, from 1623 to 1688, to one or more apostolic vicars, bishops of titular sees governing not in their own names, as diocesan bishops do, but provisionally in the name of the Pope. At first there was a single vicar for the whole kingdom, later their number was increased to four, assigned respectively to the London District, the Midland District, the Northern District, and the Western District. The number of vicariates was doubled in 1840, becoming eight: the apostolic vicariates of the London district, the Western, Eastern, and Central districts, and the districts of Wales, Lancashire, Yorkshire, and the North.

The legal situation of Catholics in England and Wales was altered for the better by the Roman Catholic Relief Act 1829, and English Catholics, who before had been reduced to a few tens of thousands, received in the 19th century thousands of converts from Anglicanism and millions of Irish Catholic immigrants, so that Catholics came to form some 10% of the general population of England and a considerably higher proportion of church-goers.

In response to petitions presented by local clergy and laity, Pope Pius IX issued the bull Universalis Ecclesiae restoring the normal diocesan hierarchy. The reasons stated in the bull are: "Considering the actual condition of Catholicism in England, reflecting on the considerable number of the Catholics, a number every day augmenting, and remarking how from day to day the obstacles become removed which chiefly opposed the propagation of the Catholic religion, We perceived that the time had arrived for restoring in England the ordinary form of ecclesiastical government, as freely constituted in other nations, where no particular cause necessitates the ministry of Vicars Apostolic."

The London district became the metropolitan Diocese of Westminster and the diocese of Southwark; the Northern district became the diocese of Hexham; that of Yorkshire became the diocese of Beverley; the district of Lancashire became the dioceses of Liverpool and Salford; the Welsh district (which included neighbouring English territory) became the two dioceses of Menevia and Newport and Shrewsbury; the Western district became the dioceses of Clifton and Plymouth; the Central district became the dioceses of Nottingham and Birmingham; and the Eastern district became the diocese of Northampton. Thus the restored hierarchy consisted of one metropolitan archbishop and twelve suffragan bishops.

Diocese	Bishop
Westminster	Nicholas Patrick Stephen Wiseman
Birmingham	William Bernard Ullathorne O.S.B
Nottingham	Joseph William Hendren O.F.M.
Shrewsbury	James Brown
Newport and Menevia	Thomas Joseph Brown, O.S.B.
Liverpool	George Hilary Brown
Beverley	John Briggs
Salford	William Turner
Southwark	Thomas Grant
Plymouth	George Errington
Northampton	William Wareing
Hexham	William Hogarth
Clifton	Thomas Burgess ^{α}

== Ancient Catholic sees in England not restored ==
The sees thus assigned to the new Catholic diocesan bishops of England did not correspond to the pre-Reformation dioceses, and were instead newly erected ones. Thus there was not to be a Catholic archbishop of Canterbury. Instead, the Diocese of Westminster was created with its own archbishop. The archbishop of Westminster was likewise not declared Primate of All England. However, he and his successors see themselves as successors to the Catholic archbishops of Canterbury. Accordingly, the heraldic arms of Westminster, featuring the pallium, is similar to that of Canterbury, with Westminster claiming to have better right to display the pallium, which is no longer granted to the archbishop of Canterbury.

The bull Universalis Ecclesiae did not indicate the reason for choosing to erect new dioceses rather than to restore the old. The main factor is likely to have been the Roman Catholic Relief Act 1829 (10 Geo. 4. c. 10), which "forbade the use of the old titles, except by the clergy of the Protestant Church by law established".

John Henry Newman declared:

"A second temple rises on the ruins of the old. Canterbury has gone its way, and York is gone, and Durham is gone, and Winchester is gone. It was sore to part with them. We clung to the vision of past greatness, and would not believe it could come to nought; but the Church in England has died, and the Church lives again. Westminster and Nottingham, Beverley and Hexham, Northampton and Shrewsbury, if the world lasts, shall be names as musical to the ear, as stirring to the heart, as the glories we have lost; and Saints shall rise out of them if God so will, and Doctors once again shall give the law to Israel, and Preachers call to penance and to justice, as at the beginning."

In contrast with what was done in England and Wales, when in 1878 the normal Catholic hierarchy was reestablished in Scotland, where the established Reformed Church did not maintain an episcopate, the old dioceses were reestablished; until then, Catholics in Scotland were, as in England and Wales, under the pastoral care of vicars apostolic. The first apostolic vicar for Scotland was appointed in 1694, and the country was divided into two vicariates in 1727, the Lowlands District and the Highlands District, which became three vicariates in 1827, Eastern, Western and Northern.

In Ireland, the Catholic Church maintained without break the succession in the old sees, with a parallel succession claimed, with government support, by the Church of Ireland.

== Reaction ==
In his first pastoral letter as Archbishop of Westminster, Wiseman wrote a sentence often quoted later, "Catholic England has been restored to its orbit in the ecclesiastical firmament".

=== Anti-Catholic reaction ===
Publication of the bull was met with an outburst of hostility. The Reformation Journal published an article under the heading "The Blight of Popery". "No Popery" processions were held all over England, and windows of Catholic churches were broken. Guy Fawkes Night proved to be a focal point for anger as demonstrated by the burnings of effigies of the new archbishop Wiseman and the pope. At Farringdon Market 14 effigies were processed from the Strand and over Westminster Bridge to Southwark, while extensive demonstrations were held throughout the suburbs of London. Effigies of the twelve new English Catholic bishops were paraded through Exeter, already the scene of severe public disorder on each anniversary of the Fifth. Joseph Drew of Weymouth responded with strong criticism in his essay Popery against the Pope, an Appeal to Protestants and in his satirical verses The Vision of the Pope; or A Snooze in the Vatican, both published in 1851. Lord John Russell, the Prime Minister, published a letter protesting against the insolence of the "Papal Aggression".

Parliament passed the Ecclesiastical Titles Act 1851, making it a criminal offence for anyone outside the "united Church of England and Ireland" to use any episcopal title "of any city, town or place, or of any territory or district (under any designation or description whatsoever), in the United Kingdom". However, this law remained a dead letter and was repealed 20 years later.

== Subsequent adjustments ==
In 1861 the name of the Hexham diocese was changed to Hexham and Newcastle. In 1878 Beverley was divided into the two new dioceses, that of Leeds and that of Middlesbrough, the original diocese becoming extinct. The Diocese of Portsmouth was formed in 1882 by the division of the Diocese of Southwark into the Dioceses of Southwark and Portsmouth. In 1895 the Diocese of Newport and Menevia was divided into the Diocese of Newport (later becoming, in 1916, the Archdiocese of Cardiff) and that of Menevia.

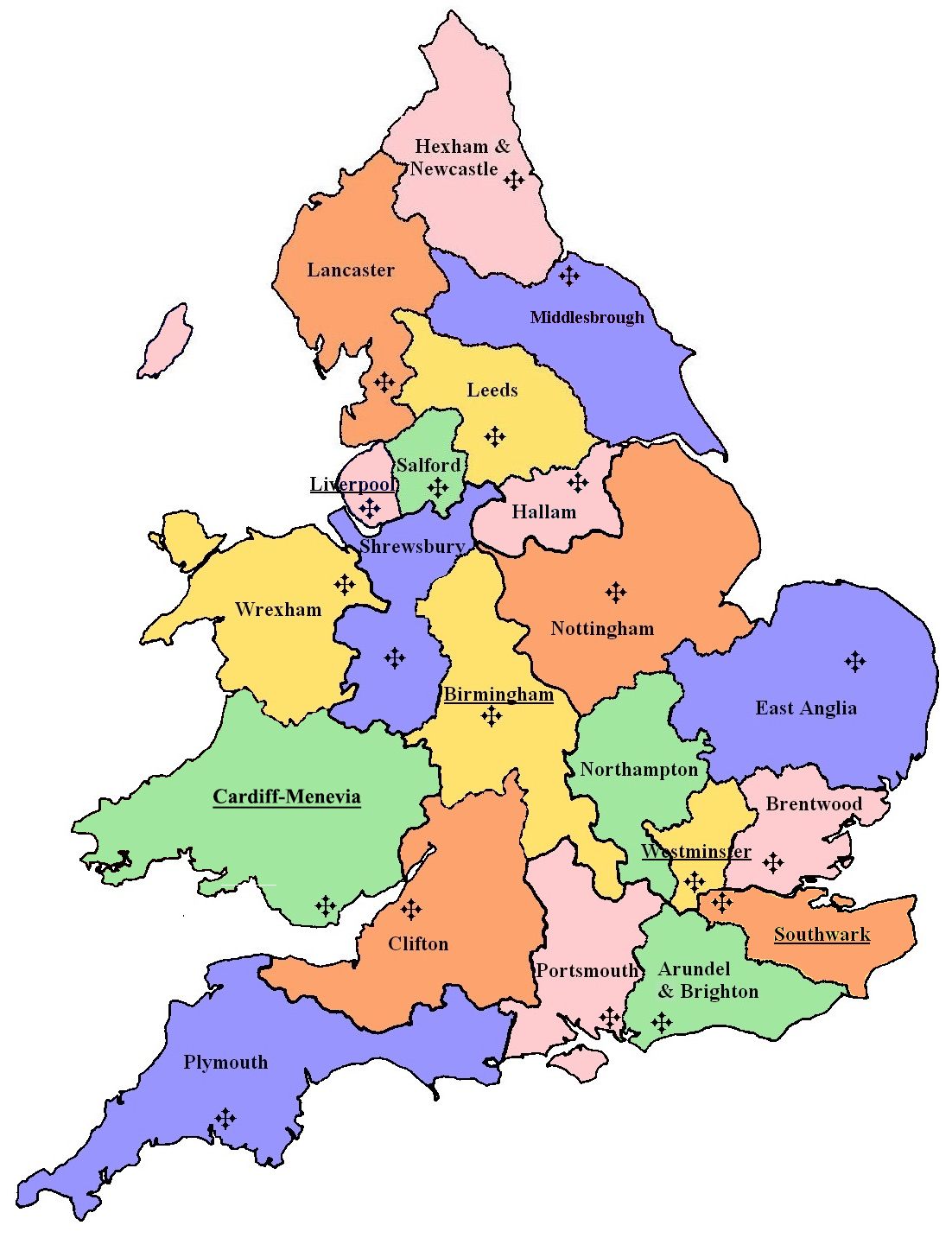
Current Catholic dioceses in England, Wales and the Isle of Man

=== Three ecclesiastical provinces ===
Thus, the metropolitan Diocese of Westminster came to have fifteen suffragan sees, the largest number in the world. Accordingly, by the Apostolic Letter Si qua est of 28 October 1911, Pope Pius X erected the new provinces of Birmingham and Liverpool, making these two dioceses metropolitan archdioceses. There remained under Westminster the suffragan sees of Northampton, Nottingham, Portsmouth, and Southwark; to Birmingham were assigned those of Clifton, Newport, Plymouth, Shrewsbury, and Menevia; and to Liverpool, Hexham and Newcastle, Leeds, Middlesbrough, and Salford.

It had for many years been felt that a division was necessary, but there had always been the fear of causing disunion thereby, especially if, as in pre-Reformation times, the division would be between north and south. This was obviated by ignoring the precedent of York and Canterbury, and arranging for three instead of two provinces. Under the new Apostolic Constitution, the Archbishop of Westminster was granted the right to "be permanent chairman of the meetings of the Bishops of all England and Wales, and for this reason it will be for him to summon these meetings and to preside over them, according to the rules in force in Italy and elsewhere." He ranks over the other two archbishops.

Instead of the natural geographical division into a northern, a midland, and a southern province, formed by drawing a line from the Humber to the River Mersey, and another from The Wash to the Bristol Channel, the Westminster or eastern province and the Birmingham or western province reach from the south-east and south-west to the Humber and Mersey respectively. In this way the northern province is contiguous to both the other two, bringing all three into closer intercommunication.

As the map shows, since 1965 Southwark is now a Metropolitan Archdiocese, with a new Diocese of Arundel and Brighton split from it, and additional suffragan sees of Portsmouth and Plymouth assigned to the province. This creates the curious situation of two adjacent Metropolitan Cathedral parishes, the boundary lying in the River Thames.

In pre-Reformation times, an attempt was made in 787 to have a third English province, roughly covering the Anglo-Saxon kingdom of Mercia^α Joseph William Hendren O.F.M. was actually the first bishop of Clifton but after less than a year he was made bishop of Nottingham.

== See also ==
- Roman Catholic Relief Act 1829
- Ecclesiastical Titles Act 1851
- Restoration of the Scottish hierarchy
