= Vicar Apostolic of the Northern District =

The Vicar Apostolic of the Northern District may refer to:

- Vicar Apostolic of the Northern District (England), a precursor title of the Bishop of Hexham and Newcastle.
- Vicar Apostolic of the Northern District (Scotland), a precursor title of the restored Bishop of Aberdeen.
