= George Witham =

English bishop

The Right Reverend George Witham
- Vicar Apostolic of the Northern District
- Church: Roman Catholic Church
- Appointed: 6 April 1716
- Term ended: 16 April 1725
- Predecessor: James Smith
- Successor: Thomas Dominic Williams
- Other post: Titular Bishop of Marcopolis
- Previous post: Vicar Apostolic of the Midland District

Orders
- Ordination: 1688
- Consecration: 15 April 1703 by Cardinal Marcantonio Barbarigo

Personal details
- Born: 16 May 1655 Cliffe Hall, Cliffe, near Darlington
- Died: 16 April 1725 (aged 69) Cliffe Hall, Cliffe, near Darlington
- Buried: All Saints' Church, Manfield, near Darlington
- Denomination: Roman Catholic
- Parents: George Witham and Grace (or Catherine) Witham (née Wyvill)

George Witham (16 May 1655 – 16 April 1725) was an English Roman Catholic bishop who served as the Vicar Apostolic of the Midland District, and, later, as the Vicar Apostolic of the Northern District.

== Early life ==
He was born at Cliffe Hall, Cliffe, near Darlington on 16 May 1655, the second of the six sons of George Witham of Cliffe and Grace (or Catherine) Wyvill, daughter of Sir Marmaduke Wyvill, 2nd Bt., of Constable Burton Hall, Yorkshire.

His elder brother, John, succeeded to Cliffe Hall, while three of his other brothers were also ordained to the priesthood: Thomas was Superior of the English Seminary in Paris, Robert was President of English College, Douai, and Anthony was a Douai priest, who fell into ill health and retired to serve the convent of the Poor Clares in Rouen.

George Witham was ordained priest a in 1688. From 1692 to 1694, he was safely harboured by his brother-in-law, George Palmes, of the Palmes family, at Naburn Hall along with several other Catholic priests. In 1694, Witham was sent to Rome by bishops Leyburn, Giffard, and Smith. In their letter to the Propaganda Fide, dated 20 October 1694, they commissioned Witham to serve as their agent for English matters with the authorities in Rome. He was also recommended to the Propaganda Fide by a letter from James II & VII, the exiled king of England and Scotland. Witham remained in his post in Rome until nominated to a Vicariate in 1702.

== Vicar Apostolic ==
It had been intended for Witham to succeed as the Vicar Apostolic of the London District, following the death of John Leyburn in 1702. He was consecrated the Titular Bishop of Marcopolis on 15 April 1703 by Cardinal Marcantonio Barbarigo, Bishop of Montefiascone. On his return to England, it had been determined instead for Bonaventure Giffard to transfer from the Midland District to the London District on 14 March 1703. Leaving Witham appointed in charge of the Midland District on 12 August 1702.

After fourteen years, he transferred to the Northern District on 6 April 1716. Due to his increasing age and various infirmities he wrote to Rome on 26 March 1723 to request for a coadjutor. He suggested Edward Dicconson for the post, however, the Holy See did not comply to the request.

He died in office at Cliffe Hall on 16 April 1725, aged 69, and was buried at All Saints' Church, Manfield, near Darlington.

== Bibliography ==
- Brady, W. Maziere (1876). The Episcopal Succession in England, Scotland and Ireland, A.D. 1400 to 1875. Vol. 3. Rome: Tipografia Della Pace.

Catholic Church titles
Preceded by Bonaventure Giffard	Vicar Apostolic of the Midland District; 1702–1716	Succeeded by John Talbot Stonor
Preceded by James Smith	Vicar Apostolic of the Northern District; 1716–1725	Succeeded by Thomas Dominic Williams
