= Thomas Smith (vicar apostolic of the Northern District) =

English Roman Catholic bishop (1763–1831)

Thomas Smith (21 March 1763 – 30 July 1831) was an English Catholic prelate who served as the Vicar Apostolic of the Northern District from 1821 to 1831.

== Biography ==
He was born on 21 March 1763, the son of James Smith of the Brooms, near Lanchester, County Durham. At the age of thirteen, he was sent to Sedgley Park School, Wolverhampton, where he became proficient in Latin and French. From there he went to the English College, Douai, where he was made procurator at the age of twenty-one. Smith was ordained to the priesthood in 1788 by Louis-François-Marc Hilaire de Conzié, Bishop of Arras.

At the time of the French Revolution, Smith was a professor of philosophy. He and his students were imprisoned for about sixteen months before being released. It was then Smith's responsibility to see that the students returned safely to their parents. In March 1795, the motley group arrived at the Blue Boar in Holburn wearing an assortment of cast-off clothes given them by the soldiers, Smith himself sporting sailor's jacket. The landlady was reluctant to receive them until she saw the nobility and gentry rise to congratulate them on their return.

Upon the death of the Rev. John Lodge in November of that year, Smith succeeded to the mission at Durham.

He was appointed coadjutor to William Gibson, Vicar Apostolic of the Northern District; the Briefs for the coadjutorship and titular see of Bolina were dated on 15 May 1807. However, the mandate for his consecration was lost in transmission to England, and a fresh mandate was applied for in July 1808. He was consecrated titular bishop of Bolina at St. Edmund's College, Ware by Bishop William Poynter on 10 March 1810, attended by bishops Gibson and Collingridge as co-consecrators. On the death of Bishop Gibson on 2 June 1821, Bishop Smith automatically succeeded as Vicar Apostolic of the Northern District.

After ten years and in poor health, he wrote on 5 July 1831 to Cardinal Lorenzo Litta, Prefect of the Congregation for the Propagation of the Faith, asking to resign his charge of the Northern District, but before it was granted Bishop Smith died at Ushaw College on 30 July 1831, aged 68. He was buried in the grounds of Ushaw College on 2 August 1831.

== Bibliography ==
- Brady, W. Maziere (1876). The Episcopal Succession in England, Scotland and Ireland, A.D. 1400 to 1875. Vol. 3. Rome: Tipografia Della Pace.

Catholic Church titles
Preceded by William Gibson	Vicar Apostolic of the Northern District; 1821–1831	Succeeded by Thomas Penswick
