= John Bewick =

English prelate (1824-1886)

John William Bewick (20 April 1824 – 29 October 1886) was an English prelate of the Roman Catholic Church. He served as Bishop of Hexham and Newcastle from 1882 to 1886.

Born in Ministeracres, Northumberland on 20 April 1824, he was ordained to the priesthood on 27 May 1850. He was appointed the Bishop of the Diocese of Hexham and Newcastle by the Holy See on 25 September 1882. His consecration to the Episcopate took place on 18 October 1882, the principal consecrator was Cardinal Henry Edward Manning, Archbishop of Westminster, and the principal co-consecrators were Archbishop Charles Petre Eyre of Glasgow and Bishop Robert Cornthwaite of Leeds.

He died in office in Tynemouth on 29 October 1886, aged 62, and was buried at Ushaw College cemetery.

Catholic Church titles
Preceded by James Chadwick	Bishop of Hexham and Newcastle; 1882–1886	Succeeded by Henry O'Callaghan
