= Henry O'Callaghan =

English prelate (1827-1904)

Henry O'Callaghan (29 March 1827 – 10 October 1904) was an English prelate of the Roman Catholic Church. He served as Bishop of Hexham and Newcastle from 1887 to 1889.

Born in London on 29 March 1827, he was appointed the Bishop of the Diocese of Hexham and Newcastle by the Holy See on 1 October 1887. His consecration to the Episcopate took place on 18 January 1888, the principal consecrator was Cardinal Lucido Maria Parocchi, and the principal co-consecrators were Bishop William Clifford of Clifton and Bishop John Vertue of Portsmouth.

He resigned on 19 September 1889 and appointed Titular Archbishop of Nicosia. He died in Florence, Italy on 10 October 1904, aged 77.

Catholic Church titles
| Preceded by John William Bewick | Bishop of Hexham and Newcastle; 1887–1889 | Succeeded by Thomas William Wilkinson |
