= Landsale =

Historical British rental system

The landsale or land-sale system was a rental or tenement system occurring in the 18th and 19th centuries in Great Britain, named after the practice of local selling of coal and operation of small-scale "land sale" collieries. This was in contrast to the larger scale, and highly mechanized "water-sale" collieries exporting coal by sea and later canal to southern England.

Land-sale coal was free of tax, and so coal users in coal producing areas could obtain coal free of duties for "water-sale coal" shipped by sea or canal, such as duties paid at the ports of London. The smaller local "land-sale" collieries were less productive, but also had lower costs as they paid lower wages to miners, or were rented by self-employed tenants. While winter weather affected all mines the smaller land sale collieries were more prone to lying idle. In the unusual case of the Wear Valley and South Durham land-sale miners were able to seasonally migrate to work on bigger water-sale collieries during part of the winter.

The landsale tenement system involved the renting out of coal rights on land to smallholders to operate mines for rent. In Decisions of the Court of King's Bench 1793 it was stated that a "land sale colliery" was a "term well known in the coal mining areas" and understood as including not only the rental or tenement on the land to be mined, but also the required stock of horses, gins, ropes, and other things necessary for working the mine. Though whether the rent on the horses and gins were included was disputed in at least one case.

Examples of landsale operations or rents under the landsale system include Brandon, County Durham where John Shaw was operating a landsale pit in 1836 using a whim-gin, usually employing horses or a bull, to raise the coal, Ushaw Moor Colliery where in 1858 a drift mine was established selling coal on this system, and Bedford Colliery at Guest Street where there was a landsale yard.
