= William Maire =

Styles of William Maire
- Reference style: The Right Reverend
- Spoken style: My Lord
- Religious style: Bishop

William Maire (1704–1769) was an English prelate of the Roman Catholic Church. He served as coadjutor to the Vicar Apostolic of the Northern District from 1768 to 1769.

He was born at Lartington Hall, Yorkshire on 14 January 1704, the son of Thomas Maire and Mary Maire (née Fermor) and brother of John Maire. He was ordained to the priesthood at Tournai by James Augustine O'Daly, Bishop of Kilfenora in December 1730. William Maire was appointed coadjutor to Francis Petre, Vicar Apostolic of the Northern District on 1 October 1767. He was consecrated the Titular Bishop of Cinna on 29 May 1768, the principal consecrator was Bishop Richard Challoner, and the principal co-consecrators were Bishop Francis Petre and Bishop James Robert Talbot.

Without succeeding the vicariate, he died at Lartington Hall on 25 July 1769, aged 65, and buried in the family vault at the Anglican Parish Church in Romaldkirk.

== Bibliography ==
- Brady, W. Maziere (1876). The Episcopal Succession in England, Scotland and Ireland, A.D. 1400 to 1875. Vol. 3. Rome: Tipografia Della Pace.
