= Edward Dicconson =

English bishop

Styles of Edward Dicconson
- Reference style: The Right Reverend
- Spoken style: My Lord or Bishop

Edward Dicconson (30 November 1670 – 5 May 1752) was an English Roman Catholic bishop who served as the Vicar Apostolic of the Northern District of England from 1740 to 1752.

== Life ==
He was the third son of Hugh Dicconson of Wrightington Hall, Lancashire and his wife, Agnes Kirkby. Wrightington was the seat of the recusant Dicconson family who had a chapel at Wrightington Hall. At the age of thirteen or fourteen he was sent to the English College at Douai where he completed his course of philosophy in 1691. He returned to Douai about 1698, having resolved to become a priest, and on being ordained in June, 1701, remained at the college many years as procurator and professor and became vice-president in 1713, while still continuing to teach theology.

At Ushaw College there is preserved a portion of a diary kept by him at this period, which gives a glimpse of the life he then led at Douai, besides mentioning some other events of interest. In it he has recorded a visit paid by him to Paris in June, 1704, when he and his brother "at St. Germain made the compliments of the College to King and Queen on the King's birthday." The king here referred to was James II of England's youthful son, later the Old Pretender, who was recognized as king, both by the exiled English Catholics and by Louis XIV of France, and to whom Dicconson's oldest brother William was tutor. The queen was the widowed Mary of Modena. In 1714 he accepted the Constitution Unigenitus [against Jansenism], and insisted on its acceptance by the students.

In April 1716, his brother Roger came to Douai to visit his only son, also named Edward, a student of much promise. In September 1717, Roger returned with another brother, Hugh, and remained for some time. The following April, Edward Dicconson and his brother Hugh went to England on business. After being employed for some time at Paris in connection with the college funds, in 1720, Dicconson left Douai, accompanied by his nephew, having been offered the position as chaplain to Bonaventure Giffard of Chillington in Staffordshire. At the same time, he served as vicar-general to Bishop John Talbot Stonor, Vicar Apostolic of the Midland District.

Dicconson had first been considered for a vicariate appointment in 1721, when Benjamin Petre was appointed coadjutor to the London District. Described as a "wise man of singular merit", he had, however, a speech impediment that made preaching difficult for him. In September 1722, he accompanied Peter Giffard to Douai, but did not stay long. At the time of his own nomination to the Northern Vicariate, Dicconson had gone to Rome as envoy-extraordinary of the secular clergy. He was consecrated on 19 March 1741 at Ghent as Titular Bishop of Malla (Mallus); passing from Ghent to Douai, he confirmed some of the students besides ordaining others.

On reaching his vicariate he fixed his residence at Finch Mill in Lancashire, a place belonging to his family. He was by then over seventy, and in 1750 petitioned for a coadjutor in the person of Francis Petrel. He died at Finch Mill and was buried in the private chapel attached to the Anglican St Wilfrid's Church, Standish, where there is a commemorative plaque in the chancel, likely commissioned by Lord of the Manor, Ralph Standish.

In the reports supplied to the Holy See on the several occasions when his name was brought forward for a bishopric, he is described as "a wise man of singular merit, of learning, application to business, and dexterity in managing affairs-though not very successful in the economy of Douai, and with an impediment of tongue, which made preaching difficult."

== Sources ==
- William Maziere Brady, Episcopal Succession (Rome, 1877), III;
- Douai Papers in Ushaw Magazine (December, 1903);
- Joseph Gillow, Bibl. Dict. Eng. Cath. (London, 1885), B.V.

Catholic Church titles
Preceded by Thomas Dominic Williams	Vicar Apostolic of the Northern District; 1740–1752	Succeeded by Francis Petre
