= Thomas Wilkinson (bishop of Hexham and Newcastle) =

English prelate (1825-1909)

Thomas William Wilkinson (5 April 1825 – 17 April 1909) was an English prelate of the Roman Catholic Church. He served as Bishop of Hexham and Newcastle from 1889 to 1909.

Born at Harperley Park, Harperley, County Durham on 5 April 1825, he was educated at Harrow and at Durham University. He graduated with a 6th class (ordinary) BA in April 1845 and with an LTh in June of the same year. He converted to Catholicism in 1846.

Wilkinson was ordained priest in December 1848 and assigned to found a mission in Tow Law, Weardale. He was appointed an auxiliary bishop of Hexham and Newcastle and Titular Bishop of Cisamus on 15 May 1888. His consecration to the Episcopate took place on 25 July 1888, the principal consecrator was Bishop William Clifford of Clifton, and the principal co-consecrators were Archbishop Charles Petre Eyre of Glasgow and Bishop Arthur Riddell of Northampton. The following year, he was appointed Bishop of Hexham and Newcastle on 28 December 1889. He also served as President of Ushaw College.

He died in office at Ushaw College on 17 April 1909, aged 84, and was buried at Ushaw College cemetery.

Catholic Church titles
Preceded by Henry O'Callaghan	Bishop of Hexham and Newcastle; 1889–1909	Succeeded by Richard Collins
