= Joseph Thorman =

English prelate

Joseph Thorman (6 August 1871 – 7 October 1936) was an English prelate of the Roman Catholic Church. He served as Bishop of Hexham and Newcastle from 1924 to 1936.

Born in Gateshead, County Durham on 6 August 1871, he was ordained to the priesthood on 27 September 1896. He was appointed the Bishop of the Diocese of Hexham and Newcastle by the Holy See on 18 December 1924. His consecration to the Episcopate took place on 27 January 1925, the principal consecrator was Archbishop Frederick William Keating of Liverpool, and the principal co-consecrators were Bishop Joseph Robert Cowgill of Leeds and Bishop Thomas Dunn of Nottingham.

He died in office in Newcastle upon Tyne on 7 October 1936, aged 65, and was buried at Ushaw College cemetery.

Catholic Church titles
Preceded by Richard Collins	Bishop of Hexham and Newcastle; 1924–1936	Succeeded by Joseph McCormack
