= Matthew Gibson (bishop) =

English bishop

Matthew Gibson (1734–1790) was an English Catholic prelate who served as the Vicar Apostolic of the Northern District from 1780 to 1790.

== Biography ==
Born in Stonecroft, near Hexham, Northumberland on 23 March 1734, the son of Jasper Gibson and Margaret Gibson (née Leadbitter). He was ordained to the priesthood in 1758. Matthew was appointed the Vicar Apostolic of the Northern District and Titular Bishop of Comana Armeniae on 17 June 1780. He was consecrated to the Episcopate by Bishop James Robert Talbot on 3 September 1780.

He died in office at Stella Hall, County Durham on 17 May 1790, aged 56.

He was succeeded by his younger brother William, who was appointed Vicar Apostolic of the Northern District on 10 September 1790.

== Bibliography ==
- Brady, W. Maziere (1876). The Episcopal Succession in England, Scotland and Ireland, A.D. 1400 to 1875. Vol. 3. Rome: Tipografia Della Pace.

Catholic Church titles
Preceded by William Walton	Vicar Apostolic of the Northern District; 1780–1790	Succeeded by William Gibson
