= Thomas Williams (vicar apostolic of the Northern District) =

Thomas Dominic Williams OP (c. 1661 – 3 April 1740) was a Roman Catholic bishop who served as the Vicar Apostolic of the Northern District in England from 1725 to 1740.

Born in Monmouthshire in 1660, he was appointed the Vicar Apostolic of the Northern District on 11 December 1725 and confirmed on 22 December 1725. He was consecrated the Titular Bishop of Tiberiopolis on 30 December 1725; the principal consecrator was Pope Benedict XIII, and the principal co-consecrators were Archbishop Vincenzo Maria d’Aragona of Cosenza and Bishop Giacinto Gaetano Chiurlia of Giovinazzo.

He died in office on 3 April 1740, aged 80.

Catholic Church titles
Preceded by George Witham	Vicar Apostolic of the Northern District; 1725–1740	Succeeded by Edward Dicconson
