= John Maire =

English conveyancer

John Maire (1703–1771) was a leading English Roman Catholic conveyancer.

Maire was the son of Thomas Maire of Lartington, Yorkshire, and an elder brother of the Roman Catholic priest William Maire. He was admitted to Gray's Inn in 1727; as a Catholic, Maire could not be called to the bar, and so he built up a conveyancing practice. He married Mary Lawson, who survived him, and had a seat at Lartington Hall.
