= Joseph McCormack =

English prelate

Joseph McCormack (1887–1958) was an English prelate who served as the Roman Catholic Bishop of Hexham and Newcastle from 1936 to 1958.

Born on 17 May 1887, he was ordained to the priesthood on 11 August 1912. He was appointed the Bishop of the Diocese of Hexham and Newcastle by the Holy See on 30 December 1936, and consecrated to the Episcopate on 4 February 1937. The principal consecrator was Archbishop Richard Downey of Liverpool, and the principal co-consecrators were Bishop Thomas Shine of Middlesbrough and Bishop Henry John Poskitt of Leeds.

He died in Newcastle-upon-Tyne on 2 March 1958, aged 70, and was buried at Ushaw College.

Catholic Church titles
Preceded by Joseph Thorman	Bishop of Hexham and Newcastle; 1936–1958	Succeeded by James Cunningham
