= Thomas Penswick =

Catholic bishop (1772–1836)

Thomas Penswick (1772–1836) was an English Roman Catholic bishop who served as the Vicar Apostolic of the Northern District from 1831 to 1836.

Born in Ashton-in-Makerfield, Lancashire on 7 March 1772, he was ordained to the priesthood on 1 April 1797. He was appointed coadjutor to the Vicar Apostolic of the Northern District, Bishop Thomas Smith, on 13 January 1824. On the same day, Penswick was appointed Titular Bishop of Europus, and consecrated to the Episcopate by Bishop William Poynter on 29 June 1824. On the death of Bishop Smith on 30 July 1831, Bishop Penswick automatically succeeded as Vicar Apostolic of the Northern District.

He died in office on 28 January 1836, aged 63.

Catholic Church titles
Preceded by Thomas Smith	Vicar Apostolic of the Northern District; 1831–1836	Succeeded by John Briggs
