= William Walton (bishop) =

English Roman Catholic bishop

William Walton (1716–1780) was an English Roman Catholic bishop who served as the Vicar Apostolic of the Northern District of England from 1775 to 1780.

Born in Manchester on 9 December 1716, he was the son of Michael and Mary Walton. He entered the English College, Douai in October 1731 and received the four minor orders on 20 April 1737. During the next few years he was ordained a sub-deacon on 29 May 1739, a deacon on 23 May 1739, and a priest on 3 April 1741. He left Douai on 4 June 1748 to serve on the English mission.

He was appointed coadjutor to Francis Petre, Vicar Apostolic of the Northern District on 18 July 1770. Later in the same year, he was consecrated Titular Bishop of Dragobitia by Francis Petre. On Bishop Petre's death on 24 December 1775, Bishop Walton automatically succeeded as Vicar Apostolic of the Northern District.

He died in office at York on 26 February 1780, aged 63, and buried at St Michael le Belfrey, York.

== Bibliography ==
- Brady, W. Maziere (1876). The Episcopal Succession in England, Scotland and Ireland, A.D. 1400 to 1875. Vol. 3. Rome: Tipografia Della Pace.

Catholic Church titles
Preceded by Francis Petre	Vicar Apostolic of the Northern District; 1775–1780	Succeeded by Matthew Gibson
