= Francis Mostyn (vicar apostolic of the Northern District) =

Catholic bishop

Francis George Mostyn (1800–1847) was an English Catholic prelate who served as Vicar Apostolic of the Northern District from 1840 to 1847.

== Biography ==
Mostyn was born in 1800, the son of Charles Browne Mostyn, of Kidlington, Oxfordshire, by his second wife, Miss Tucker. His grandfather was Sir Edward Mostyn, 5th Mostyn Baronet, of Talacre. Francis began his education at St Mary's College, Oscott in 1813, leaving three years later, only to return as an ecclesiastical student in December 1822. He was ordained to the priesthood in 1828, and for the next twelve years he served the mission in Wolverhampton.

He was appointed the Vicar Apostolic of the Northern District and Titular Bishop of Abydus on 22 September 1840. His consecration to the Episcopate took place on 21 December 1840, the principal consecrator was Bishop John Briggs, with bishops Walsh and Brown as co-consecrators.

He died in office at Durham on 11 August 1847, aged 47, and was buried in the cemetery at Ushaw College.

== Bibliography ==
- Brady, W. Maziere (1876). The Episcopal Succession in England, Scotland and Ireland, A.D. 1400 to 1875. Vol. 3. Rome: Tipografia Della Pace.

Catholic Church titles
Preceded by John Briggs	Vicar Apostolic of the Northern District; 1840–1847	Succeeded by William Riddell
