= Ushaw Moor =

Village in England

Coordinates: 54.778°N 1.64565867°W

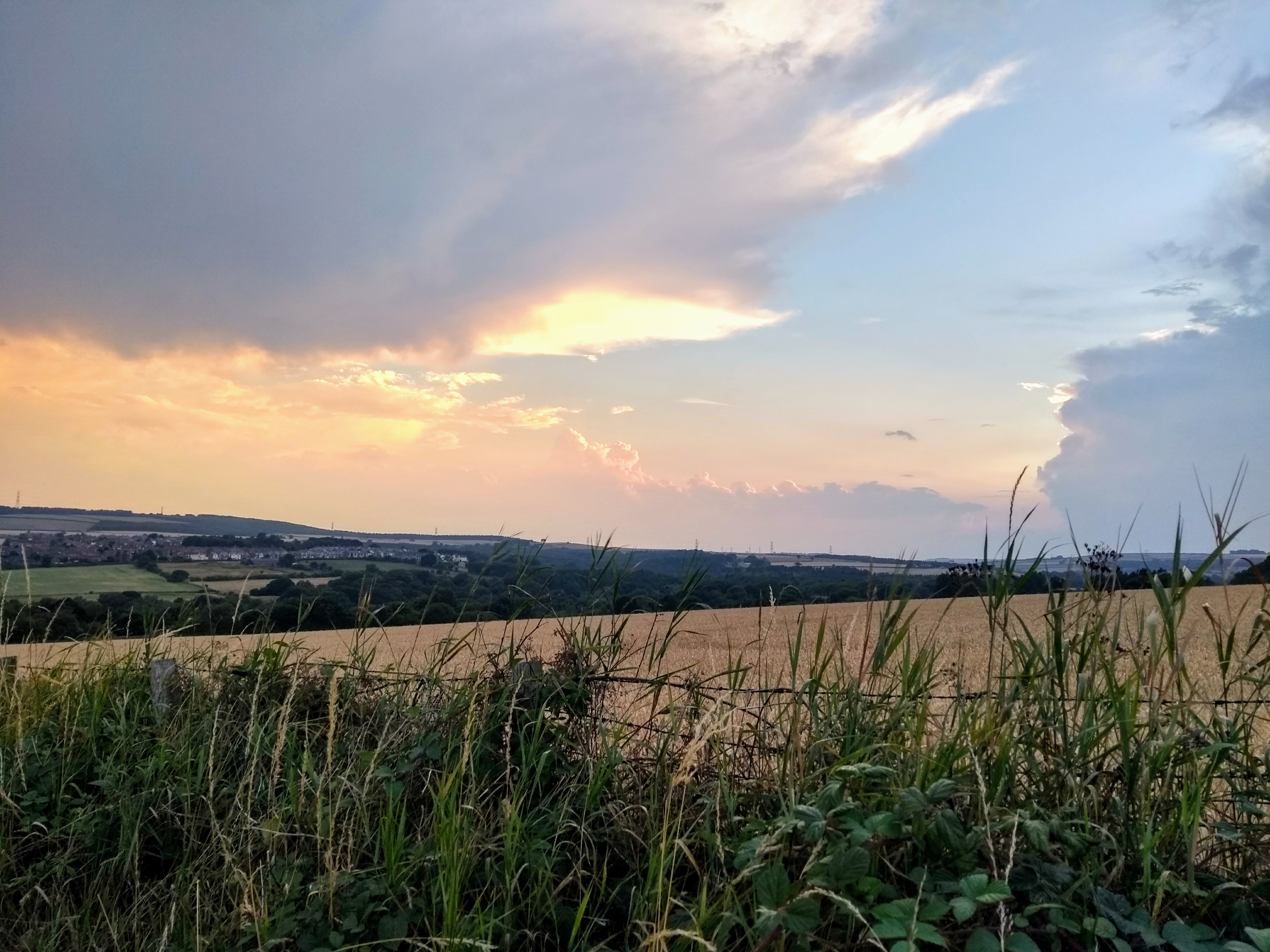

- Location within County Durham
- Population: 3,941 (2011 census)
- OS grid reference: NZ22894261
- Civil parish: Brandon and Byshottles
- Unitary authority: County Durham
- Ceremonial county: County Durham
- Region: North East
- Country: England
- Sovereign state: United Kingdom
- Post town: Durham
- Postcode district: DH7
- Dialling code: 0191
- Police: Durham
- Fire: County Durham and Darlington
- Ambulance: North East
- UK Parliament: City of Durham

Ushaw Moor is an old pit village in County Durham, in England, on the north side of the River Deerness. It is situated to the west of Durham, a short distance to the south of Bearpark. Ushaw Moor falls within the Deerness electoral ward in the City of Durham constituency, whose MP since 2019 has been Mary Foy.

== Etymology ==
It most likely seems that the name "Ushaw" comes from Scandinavian origin which, when translated, means "wolves' wood". With the addition of Moor we get "the moor near the wood of wolves".

== History ==
Parish registers suggests that the settlement dates to a least the sixteenth century. The village existed in a largely agricultural state, with a windmill being its one feature up till the nineteenth century.

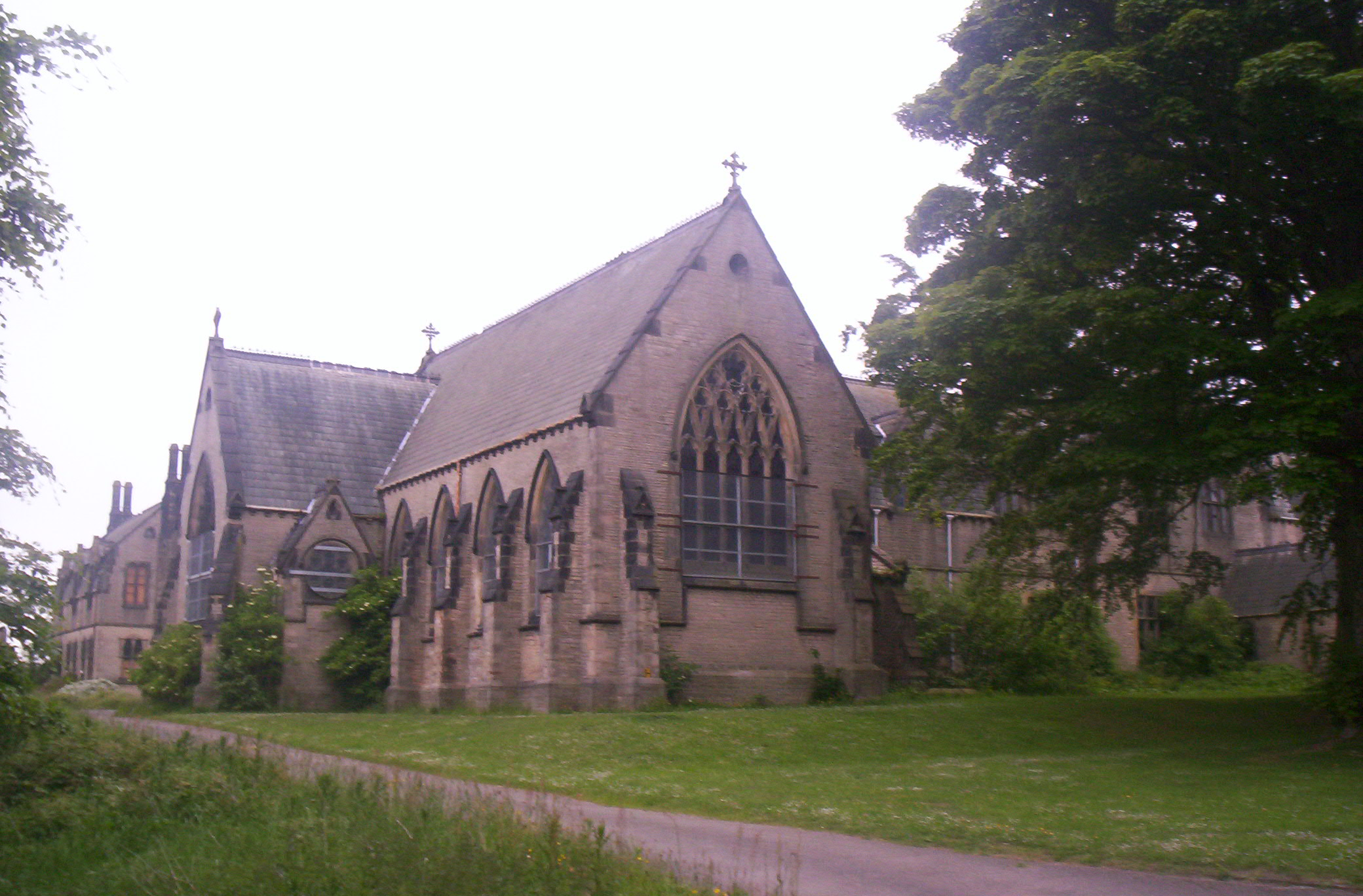
Ushaw college

In 1804 Bishop William Gibson ordered the building of St. Cuthbert's College, later named Ushaw College, which opened in 1808. A chapel was added in 1847, followed by a library and exhibition hall. This closed in 2011 as a seminary and opened in 2014 as a visitor attraction and is known as Ushaw Historic House, Chapels & Gardens.

In 1858 a drift mine was established at Ushaw Moor Colliery selling coal on the landsale system. This was purchased in 1879 by Henry Chaytor of Witton Castle. During his tenure there was a large strike, following the deliberate sacking of an elected union leader in 1881. The strike was ended when a number of policemen were brought into the village to evict the strikers and their families; such treatment was not uncommon in those times. Mr Chaytor, sick of the years of industrial unrest, sold Ushaw Moor colliery to Pease & Partners in 1883. From this time, the workmen and community had an easier life, the new owners helping rather than opposing them. However, Ushaw Moor colliery closed in 1960, as part of the collapse of the Durham coal fields.

In the last thirty years it has grown and become the centre of the Deerness Valley, becoming unusually prosperous where most pit villages have struggled. Good links with Durham and Newcastle and good local schools and amenities has meant it is very popular with first time buyers.

== Geography ==
Ushaw Moor is approximately 2 miles west of Durham and 20 miles south of Newcastle upon Tyne.

The Deerness Valley Railway Path, an eight-mile stretch of scenic woodland pathway converted from the former tracks of the Deerness Valley Railway, runs through Ushaw Moor.

== Education ==
Ushaw Moor is the location of Silver Tree Primary School and St. Joseph's Roman Catholic Primary School. Durham Academy is the main secondary school for the village.

Ushaw College, until its closure in 2011, was a Roman Catholic seminary and one of the constituent colleges of the University of Durham. The college is currently being used by Durham University Business School whilst its own site is redeveloped. Ushaw College also hosts the annual Ushaw Jazz Festival.

== Religion ==
Ushaw Moor is served by three churches:

- Ushaw Moor Baptist Church
- St. Luke's Church
- St. Joseph's Catholic Church

== Sports ==
Ushaw Moor Cricket Club was established in 1881 and has 2 senior teams and 4 junior teams.
