= Francis Petre (bishop) =

English Roman Catholic bishop, Vicar Apostolic of the Northern District (1692–1775)

Francis Petre (1691–1775) was an English Roman Catholic bishop who served as the Vicar Apostolic of the Northern District from 1752 to 1775.

Francis Petre was born at Fidlers, Essex on 2 October 1692, the second son of Joseph and Catherine Petre. His maternal grandfather was Sir Williams Andrews of Denton, Baronet. On his father's side, he was descended from John Petre, 1st Baron Petre. After the death of his paternal grandmother, his grandfather, John Petre, became Jesuit lay brother.

Francis was ordained to the priesthood on 31 March 1720. He was appointed coadjutor to Edward Dicconson, Vicar Apostolic of the Northern District on 27 July 1750. Exactly a year later, Petre was consecrated the Titular Bishop of Amorium by Bishop Dicconson on 27 July 1751. The following year, he succeeded as the Vicar Apostolic of the Northern District.

He died in office on 24 December 1775, aged 83. There is a grave stone memorial to Bishop Petre in the 11th Century Church of St Saviour at Stydd which is outside the village of Ribchester in the Ribble Valley in Lancashire.

Catholic Church titles
Preceded by Edward Dicconson	Vicar Apostolic of the Northern District; 1752–1775	Succeeded by William Walton
