= John Briggs (bishop) =

English prelate

The Right Reverend John Briggs
- Bishop of Beverley
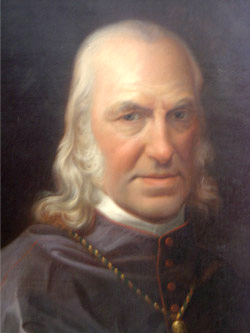
- Church: Roman Catholic
- Diocese: Diocese of Beverley
- Appointed: 29 September 1850
- Term ended: 17 September 1860
- Successor: Robert Cornthwaite

Orders
- Ordination: 19 July 1814 (priest) by William Gibson
- Consecration: 29 June 1833 (bishop) by Thomas Penswick

Personal details
- Born: 20 May 1789 Barton Moss, near Eccles, England
- Died: 4 January 1861 (aged 72) York, England
- Buried: St. Leonard's Chapel, Hazlewood, near Tadcaster, England
- Denomination: Roman Catholic

John Briggs (20 May 1788 – 4 January 1861) was an English prelate of the Roman Catholic Church. He served as the first Bishop of Beverley from 1850 to 1860.

== Early life ==
John Briggs was born in Barton Moss, near Eccles, Lancashire, England. He was educated at Sedgley Park School, Wolverhampton. On 13 October 1804 he entered St. Cuthbert's College in County Durham. He received the Tonsure and the four Minor Orders on 14 December 1804. Afterwards, he was ordained a subdeacon on 19 December 1812, a deacon on 3 April 1813, and a priest on 19 July 1814; all ordinations by William Gibson, Vicar Apostolic of the Northern District.

Briggs remained at the college as a professor. In 1818, he was sent on a mission to Chester, and remained there fourteen years. One of his students in Chester was Thomas Grant, (later rector of the English College, Rome and future bishop of the Diocese of Southwark). Grant's mother had died when he was ten, so when his father's military unit was deployed from Chester, the thirteen year old remained with Briggs's household to continue his education before entering St. Cuthbert's himself; financed largely by Briggs from Lancaster District funds. Grant spent over three years with Dr. Briggs and from the day he left him until the day Briggs died, Grant made a point of writing to him annually on the anniversary of his entrance to St. Cuthbert's to thank him for his kindness to him while under his roof. On 28 March 1828 Briggs was elected President of St. Cuthbert's and returned to Ushaw. He remained at the college until 11 August 1832.

== Episcopal career ==
On 22 January 1833, he was appointed Coadjutor Vicar Apostolic of the Northern District. He received his episcopal consecration at Ushaw College on 29 June 1833, the principal consecrator was Bishop Thomas Penswick, Vicar Apostolic of the Northern District, and the principal co-consecrators were Bishop Peter Augustine Baines, Vicar Apostolic of the Western District and Bishop Thomas Walsh, Vicar Apostolic of the Midland District.

On the death of Bishop Thomas Penswick on 28 January 1836, Briggs succeeded as Vicar Apostolic of the Northern District. In 1840, two vicariates apostolic were created out of the Northern District, with Bishop Briggs appointed Vicar Apostolic of the Yorkshire District on 3 July 1840.

On the restoration of the Catholic hierarchy in England and Wales by Pope Pius IX on 29 September 1850, he was appointed Bishop of the Diocese of Beverley. He resigned as Bishop of Beverley on 17 September 1860 and died at his house in York on 4 January 1861, aged 72. A solemn Requiem Mass was held at St George's Pro-Cathedral, York on 9 January, followed by the bishop's burial in St. Leonard's Chapel, Hazlewood, near Tadcaster on 10 January 1861.

== Bibliography ==
- Brady, W. Maziere (1876). The Episcopal Succession in England, Scotland and Ireland, A.D. 1400 to 1875. Vol. 3. Rome, Italy: Tipografia Della Pace. pp. 280, 341, 396–398.

Catholic Church titles
Preceded by Thomas Penswick	Vicar Apostolic of the Northern District; 1836–1840	Succeeded by Francis George Mostyn
New title	Vicar Apostolic of the Yorkshire District; 1840–1850	Title abolished
New title	Bishop of Beverley; 1850–1860	Succeeded by Robert Cornthwaite
