= William Gibson (bishop) =

English prelate

The Right Reverend William Gibson
- Vicar Apostolic of the Northern District
- Church: Roman Catholic Church
- In office: 1790–1821
- Predecessor: Matthew Gibson
- Successor: Thomas Smith
- Other post: Titular Bishop of Achantus

Orders
- Ordination: 1764 (priesthood)
- Consecration: 5 December 1790 by Charles Walmesley

Personal details
- Born: 2 February 1738 Hexham, Northumberland, England
- Died: 2 June 1821 (aged 83) Ushaw Moor, County Durham, England
- Denomination: Roman Catholicism

William Gibson (2 February 1738 – 2 June 1821) was an English Catholic prelate who served as Vicar Apostolic of the Northern District from 1790 to 1821. He was previously president of the English College, Douai from 1781 to 1790.

== Biography ==
Born in Stonecroft, near Hexham, Northumberland on 2 February 1738, the son of Jasper Gibson and Margaret Gibson (née Leadbitter). He was sent for his education to Douai and served as president of the college from 1781 to 1790.

Gibson was ordained to the priesthood in 1764. Following the death of his older brother Matthew on 17 May 1790, William was appointed the Vicar Apostolic of the Northern District and Titular Bishop of Achantus on 10 September 1790. He was consecrated to the Episcopate at Lulworth Castle by Bishop Charles Walmesley on 5 December 1790.

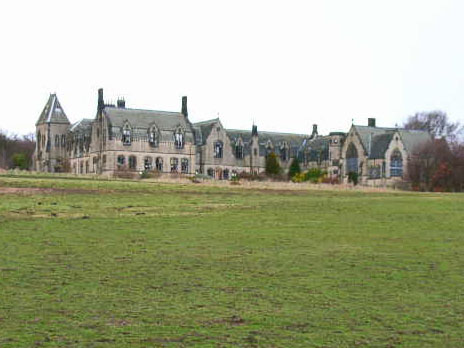
Ushaw College

When the English College at Douai was forced to close in 1795 following the French Revolution, some of the students were settled temporarily at Crook Hall northwest of Durham. In 1804 Bishop Gibson began to build at Ushaw Moor, four miles west of Durham. These buildings, designed by James Taylor, were opened as St Cuthbert's College in 1808.

Bishop Gibson resided principally at York, although sometimes with the resident priest at Durham, Thomas Smith, who, in 1810, he requested as his coadjutor. In 1819, becoming increasingly more frail in mind and body, his powers to transferred to Bishop Smith.

He died in office on 2 June 1821, aged 83, at Ushaw and was buried in the college cemetery at Ushaw College which he himself had founded in 1804.

Catholic Church titles
Preceded by Matthew Gibson	Vicar Apostolic of the Northern District; 1790–1821	Succeeded by Thomas Smith
