= Apostolic Vicariate of the Northern District (England) =

Latin Catholic ecclesiastical jurisdiction in England (1688-1850)

The Apostolic Vicariate of the Northern District

Location
- Country: England
- Territory: Counties of Cumberland, Durham, Northumberland, and Westmorland, and until 1840 also Cheshire, Lancashire, Yorkshire, and the Isle of Man

Information
- Denomination: Catholic Church
- Sui iuris church: Latin Church
- Rite: Roman Rite
- Established: 30 January 1688
- Dissolved: 29 September 1850

The Apostolic Vicariate of the Northern District was an ecclesiastical jurisdiction of the Catholic Church in England and Wales. It was led by a vicar apostolic who was a titular bishop. The Apostolic Vicariate of the Northern District was created in 1688 and dissolved in 1850 and was replaced by the Diocese of Hexham, which changed to the Diocese of Hexham and Newcastle in 1861.

== Background ==
Soon after the accession of Queen Elizabeth I, the bishops of England were forced to choose between taking the Oath of Supremacy, thus denying the authority of the Pope, and losing their episcopal sees. Those who chose to continue their allegiance to Rome were subsequently deposed and replaced in their sees by priests of the Church of England. Most of the deposed Bishops were imprisoned in various locations and died in captivity over a period of years, though some left the country and continued their work overseas. The last of the deposed bishops was Thomas Goldwell, Bishop of St Asaph, who died in Rome on 3 April 1585.

== The Vicar Apostolic of England ==
The Vicars Apostolic were established in 1622 by the Congregation for the Propagation of Faith to provide a Catholic bishop with jurisdiction in England. So it was that Dr William Bishop was appointed, with the title of Vicar Apostolic of England. He died shortly afterwards and was succeeded by Dr Richard Smith, who in August 1631 was forced to resign and fled to France. The office then remained vacant until its revival in 1685 with the appointment of Dr John Leyburn as Vicar Apostolic and bishop.

== Geographical Organisation ==
In 1623 the first Vicar Apostolic, Dr Bishop, divided England into six areas and placed a superior at the head of each with the title of vicar general. This structure remained in place until Dr Leyburn reduced the number from six to four. It was on the basis of these four areas that on 30 January 1688 Pope Innocent XI increased the number of bishops in England to a total of four. The territory of the former single Vicariate Apostolic was then reduced, becoming the Apostolic Vicariate of the London District. So it was that the Apostolic Vicariate of the Northern District was created, along with the Apostolic Vicariate of the Midland District and the Apostolic Vicariate of the Western District.

The Northern District consisted of the historic counties of Cheshire, Cumberland, Durham, Lancashire, Northumberland, Westmorland, and Yorkshire, plus the Isle of Man. The first Vicar Apostolic of the Northern District was Bishop James Smith, who died in 1711. He was succeeded in 1716, after an interregnum, by Bishop George Witham, hitherto Vicar Apostolic of the Midland District. In 1840, the Northern District lost roughly half of its territory on the creation of the Lancashire and Yorkshire districts. Despite intermittent persecution, an Apostolic Vicariate of the Northern District continued in existence until 1850.

== List of vicars apostolic ==
Vicars Apostolic of the Northern District
| From | Until | Incumbent | Notes |
|---|---|---|---|
| 1688 | 1711 | James Smith, Titular Bishop of Callipolis | Appointed vicar apostolic and titular bishop on 28 January 1688. Consecrated on 13 May 1688. Died in office on 13 May 1711. |
| 1711 | 1716 | Vacant | |
| 1716 | 1725 | George Witham, Titular Bishop of Marcopolis | Translated from the Midland District. Appointed Vicar Apostolic of the Northern District on 6 April 1716. Died in office on 16 April 1725. |
| 1725 | 1740 | Thomas Dominic Williams, O.P., Titular Bishop of Tiberiopolis | Appointed vicar apostolic and titular bishop on 11 December 1725. Consecrated on 30 December 1725. Died in office on 3 April 1740. |
| 1740 | 1752 | Edward Dicconson, Titular Bishop of Mallus | Appointed vicar apostolic and titular bishop on 6 October 1740. Consecrated on 19 March 1741. Died in office on 24 April 1752. |
| 1752 | 1775 | Francis Petre, Titular Bishop of Amorium | Appointed coadjutor vicar apostolic and titular bishop on 27 July 1750. Consecrated on 27 July 1751. Succeeded vicar apostolic on 5 May 1752. Died in office on 24 December 1775. |
| 1768 | 1769 | (William Maire, Titular Bishop of Cinna) | Appointed coadjutor vicar apostolic and titular bishop on 1 October 1768. Consecrated on 29 May 1768. Died without succeeding on 25 July 1769. |
| 1775 | 1780 | William Walton, Titular Bishop of Dragobitia (Drago) | Ordained to the priesthood in 1741. Appointed coadjutor vicar apostolic and titular bishop on 18 July 1770. Succeeded vicar apostolic on 24 December 1775. Died in office on 26 February 1780. |
| 1780 | 1790 | Matthew Gibson, Titular Bishop of Comana Armeniae | Appointed vicar apostolic and titular bishop on 17 June 1780. Consecrated on 3 September 1780. Died in office on 17 May 1790. |
| 1790 | 1821 | William Gibson, Titular Bishop of Achantus | Appointed vicar apostolic and titular bishop on 10 September 1790. Consecrated on 5 December 1790. Died in office on 2 June 1821. |
| 1821 | 1831 | Thomas Smith, Titular Bishop of Bolina | Appointed coadjutor vicar apostolic and titular bishop on 15 May 1807. Consecrated on 10 March 1810. Succeeded vicar apostolic on 2 June 1821. Died in office on 30 July 1831. |
| 1831 | 1836 | Thomas Penswick, Titular Bishop of Europus | Appointed vicar apostolic and titular bishop on 13 January 1824. Consecrated on 29 June 1824. Died in office on 28 January 1836. |
| 1836 | 1840 | John Briggs, Titular Bishop of Trachis | Appointed coadjutor vicar apostolic and titular bishop on 22 January 1833. Consecrated on 29 June 1833. Succeeded vicar apostolic on 28 January 1836. Translated to the Yorkshire District on 3 July 1840. |
| 1840 | 1847 | Francis George Mostyn, Titular Bishop of Abydus | Appointed vicar apostolic and titular bishop on 22 September 1840. Consecrated on 21 December 1840. Died in office on 11 August 1847. |
| Aug 1847 | Nov 1847 | William Riddell, Titular Bishop of Lagania | Appointed coadjutor vicar apostolic and titular bishop on 22 December 1843. Consecrated on 17 March 1844. Succeeded vicar apostolic on 11 August 1847. Died in office on 2 November 1847. |
| 1848 | 1850 | William Hogarth, Titular Bishop of Samosata | Appointed vicar apostolic and titular bishop on 28 July 1848. Consecrated on 24 August 1848. Appointed Bishop of Hexham on 29 September 1850 when the district elevated to a diocese. The episcopal title changed to Bishop of Hexham and Newcastle on 23 May 1861. |

== Bishop of Hexham ==
The last Vicar Apostolic of the Northern District was Bishop William Hogarth, who on 30 September 1850 was assigned the title of bishop of Hexham. On the previous day, 29 September, Pope Pius IX had issued the Bull Universalis Ecclesiae, by which thirteen new dioceses were created, commonly known as the restoration of the English hierarchy, among them the diocese of Hexham, a new jurisdiction to replace formally the old Vicariate. In 1861 the diocese of Hexham was renamed the diocese of Hexham and Newcastle and its head took the title Bishop of Hexham and Newcastle, which has remained until the present day.

== See also ==
- Catholic Church hierarchy
- Catholic Church in England and Wales
- Lists of patriarchs, archbishops, and bishops
- Catholic bishops

== Bibliography ==
- Brady, W. Maziere (1876). The Episcopal Succession in England, Scotland and Ireland, A.D. 1400 to 1875. Vol. 3. Rome: Tipografia Della Pace.
