= Ushaw College =

Ushaw: Historic House, Chapels & Gardens
- Formerly Ushaw College
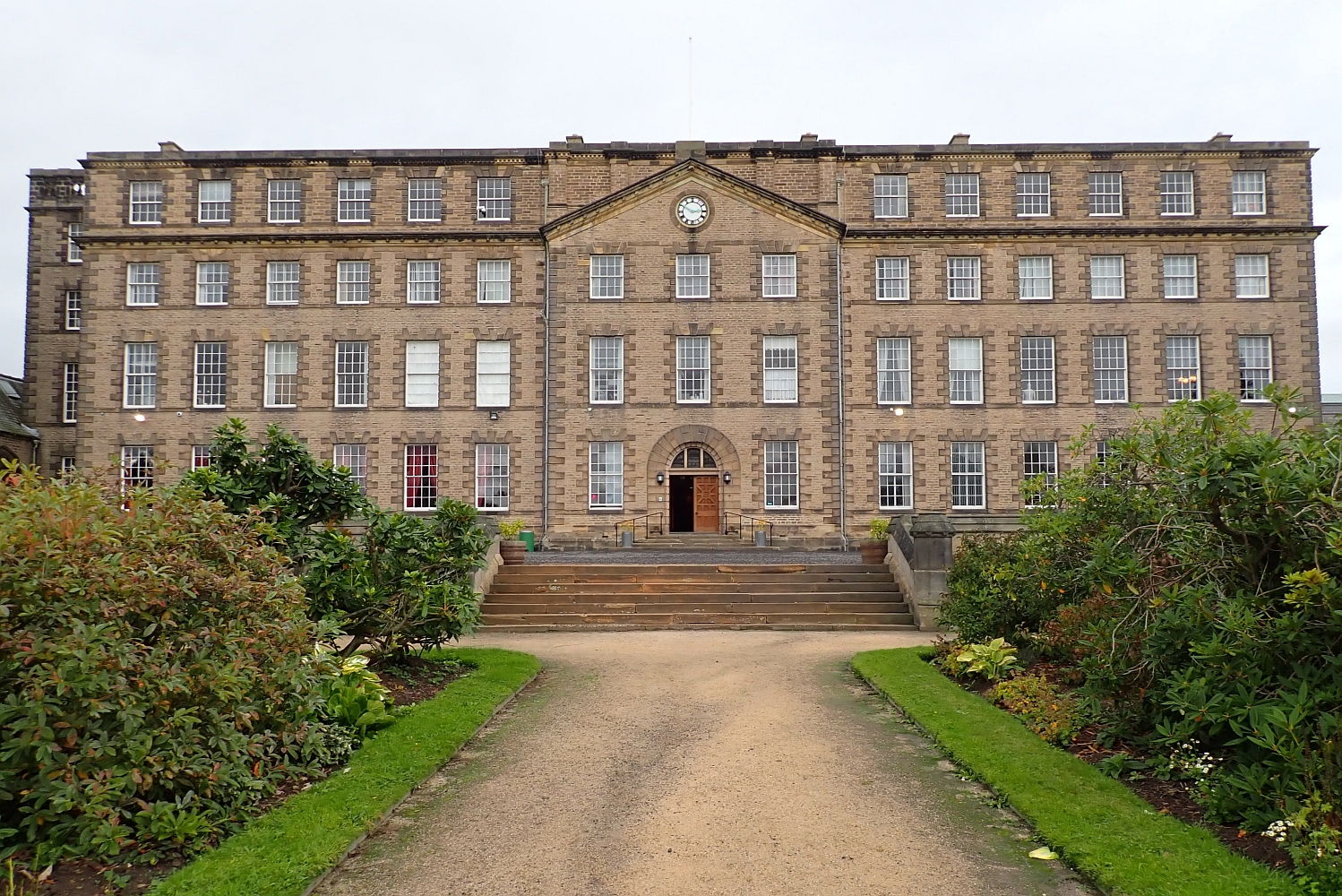
- Main Building

- Location within County Durham
- 54.78818°N 1.66116°W
- OS grid reference: NZ 21844 43702
- Location: Ushaw Moor, Durham
- Country: England
- Denomination: Roman Catholic
- Website: www.ushaw.org

History
- Former name(s): English College, Douai
- Status: Theological College
- Founded: September 29, 1568
- Founder: Bishop William Gibson
- Dedication: Saint Cuthbert
- Consecrated: September 1808

Architecture
- Functional status: Closed as college, open as visitor attraction
- Heritage designation: Grade II with parts Grade II* and St Michael's Chapel Grade I
- Designated: 17 January 1967 (main block and college chapel; other parts, including St Michael's Chapel, added 24 June 1987)
- Architect(s): James Taylor; Dunn and Hansom
- Style: Gothic Revival
- Groundbreaking: 23 April 1804
- Completed: 2 August 1808
- Closed: June 2011

Administration
- Province: Liverpool
- Diocese: Hexham and Newcastle
- Deanery: St Cuthbert
- Parish: St Joseph's, Ushaw Moor

Ushaw College (formally St Cuthbert's College, Ushaw) is a former Roman Catholic seminary near the village of Ushaw Moor, County Durham, in Northeast England. Until 2011 it was also a licensed hall of residence of Durham University. It is now a heritage and cultural tourist attraction. The campus is known for its Georgian and Victorian Gothic architecture and listed nineteenth-century chapels. It now hosts a programme of art exhibitions, music and theatre events, alongside tearooms and a café.

The college was founded in 1808 by scholars from the English College, Douai, who had fled France after the French Revolution. Ushaw College was affiliated with Durham University from 1968 and was the principal Roman Catholic seminary for the training of Catholic priests in the north of England.

In 2011, the seminary closed, due to the shortage of vocations. It reopened as a visitor attraction, marketed as Ushaw: Historic House, Chapels & Gardens in late 2014 and, as of 2023, receives over 100,000 visitors a year. The County Durham Music Service and Durham University Centre for Evaluation and Monitoring are based at the college and buildings at the college are also used by Durham University Business School.

== History ==
=== Founding ===
The English College, Douai was founded in 1568 but was forced to leave France in 1795 following the French Revolution. Part of the college settled temporarily at Crook Hall near Lanchester, northwest of Durham. In 1804 Bishop William Gibson began to build at Ushaw Moor, four miles west of Durham. These buildings, designed by James Taylor, were opened as St Cuthbert's College in 1808. There was a steady expansion during the nineteenth century with new buildings put up to cater for the expanding number of clerical and secular students. In 1847, the newly built chapel, designed by Augustus Welby Northmore Pugin was opened. This was followed by the Big Library and Exhibition Hall designed by Joseph Hansom, 1849–1851. The Junior House, designed by Peter Paul Pugin, was added in 1859. St Cuthbert's Chapel, designed by Dunn and Hansom, was opened in 1884, replacing AWN Pugin's 1847 chapel which the seminary had outgrown. The Refectory was designed and built by E. W. Pugin. The final development came in the early 1960s with the opening of a new East wing, providing additional classrooms and single bedrooms for 75 students. The main college buildings are Grade II listed, the College Chapel is Grade II* and the Chapel of St Michael is Grade I.

=== Durham University ===
Although independent, Ushaw College had a close working relationship with Durham University. The college became a Licensed Hall of Residence of Durham University in 1968. It was independent of the university but offered courses validated by the university, and both Church and lay students studied at the college. The Junior House closed in 1972, its younger students being transferred to St Joseph's College, Up Holland in Lancashire.

=== 21st century ===
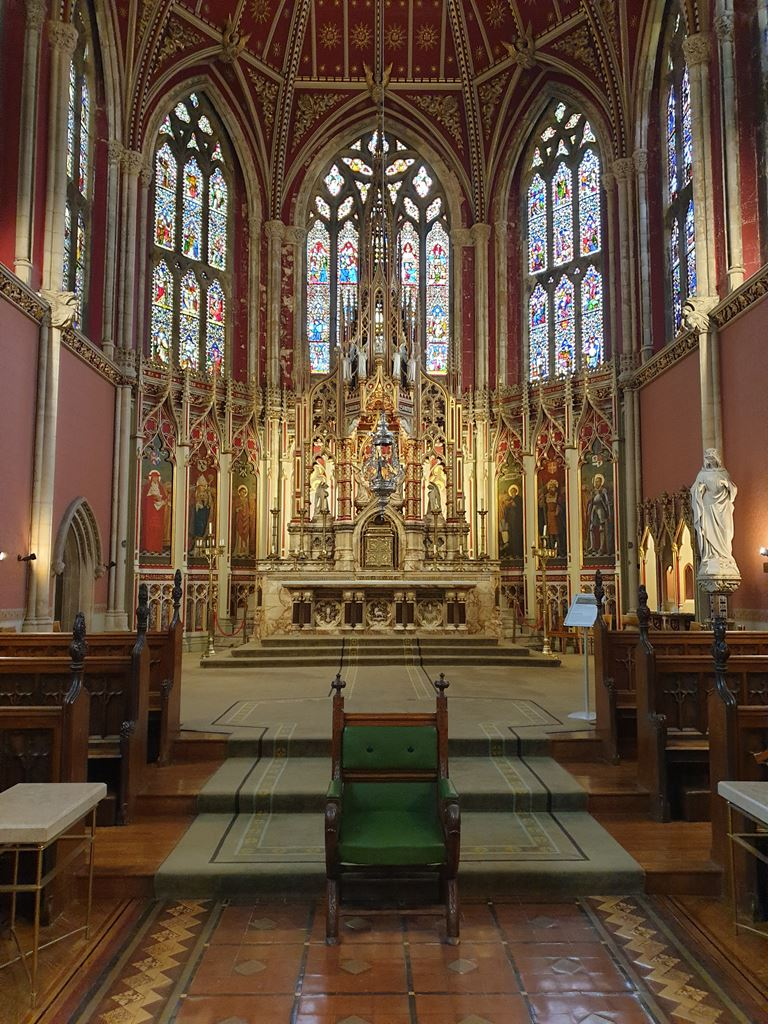
St Cuthbert's Chapel

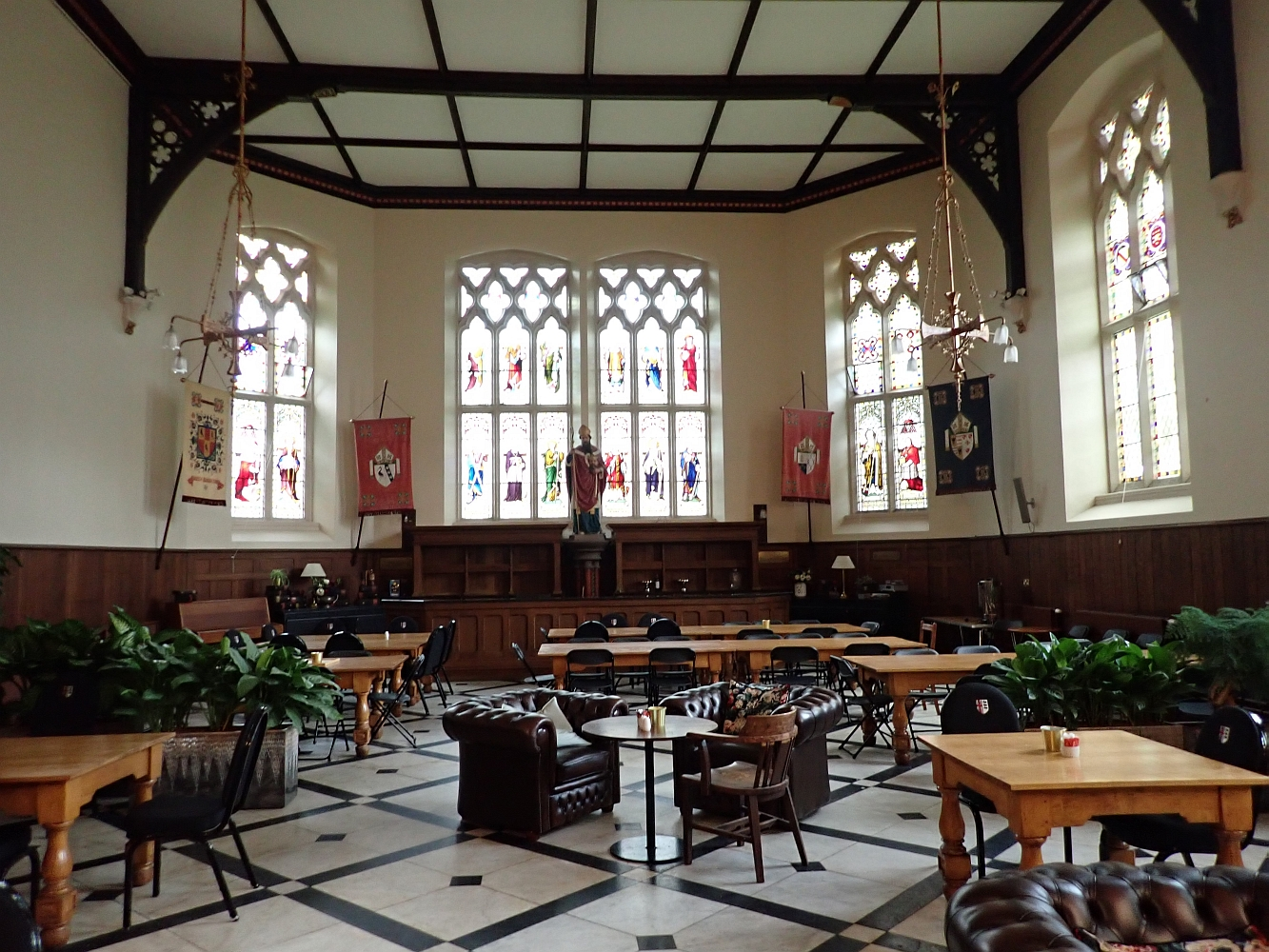
Refectory

In 2002, the college rejected a report from the Roman Catholic hierarchy that it should merge with St Mary's College, Oscott, near Birmingham. However, in October 2010 it was announced that the college would close in 2011 due to the shortage of vocations in the Roman Catholic Church, and that the site might be sold. Following a detailed feasibility study by the college's Trustees and Durham University, and with support from Durham County Council and English Heritage, it was announced in January 2012 that Durham Business School would temporarily relocate to the college during rebuilding of the school's buildings in Durham. This was seen as the first step in a long-term education-based vision for the site.

The university also agreed to catalogue and archive the Ushaw library and inventory the other collections to ensure their preservation and specialist conservation, with a view to creating a proposed Ushaw Centre for Catholic Scholarship and Heritage. In March 2019, an uncatalogued early charter of King John was found in the library manuscript collection.

In 2017, Durham University announced plans to develop an international residential research library at Ushaw College, with the aim of attracting scholars from around the world to work on the collections of Ushaw, Durham University and Durham Cathedral. The university has also confirmed that it has extended the agreement to lease the east wing of the college (used by the Business School) to 2027. The college is also used for numerous musical events and for the Ushaw Lecture Series, organised by the university's Centre for Catholic Studies.

In 2018, Durham University's Centre for Evaluation and Monitoring (CEM) moved into the east wing of the college, previously used by the Business School.

The Junior Seminary Chapel of St Aloysius and adjacent common room buildings were badly damaged in a suspected arson attack in July 2023.

In 2026, the Big Library was opened to the public for one day a month as part of the Ushaw 175th anniversary celebrations.

== Heraldry ==
The college armorial bearings are "Per pale dexter Argent a Cross Gules on a Canton Azure a Cross of St Cuthbert proper sinister impaling Allen Argent three Rabbits couchant in pale Sable."

Various emblems on shield represent the college's history and foundation, for example:-

- Three coneys are from the family coat of arms of William Allen, the founder of English College, Douai. See Three hares.
- The small cross of St Cuthbert represents the college's patron saint (it is modelled on St Cuthbert's own pectoral cross, which is kept in the Treasury at Durham Cathedral).
- The large cross of St George honours the English Roman Catholic Martyrs.

== Alumni ==
Early drawing of Ushaw designed (1804–1808) by James Taylor

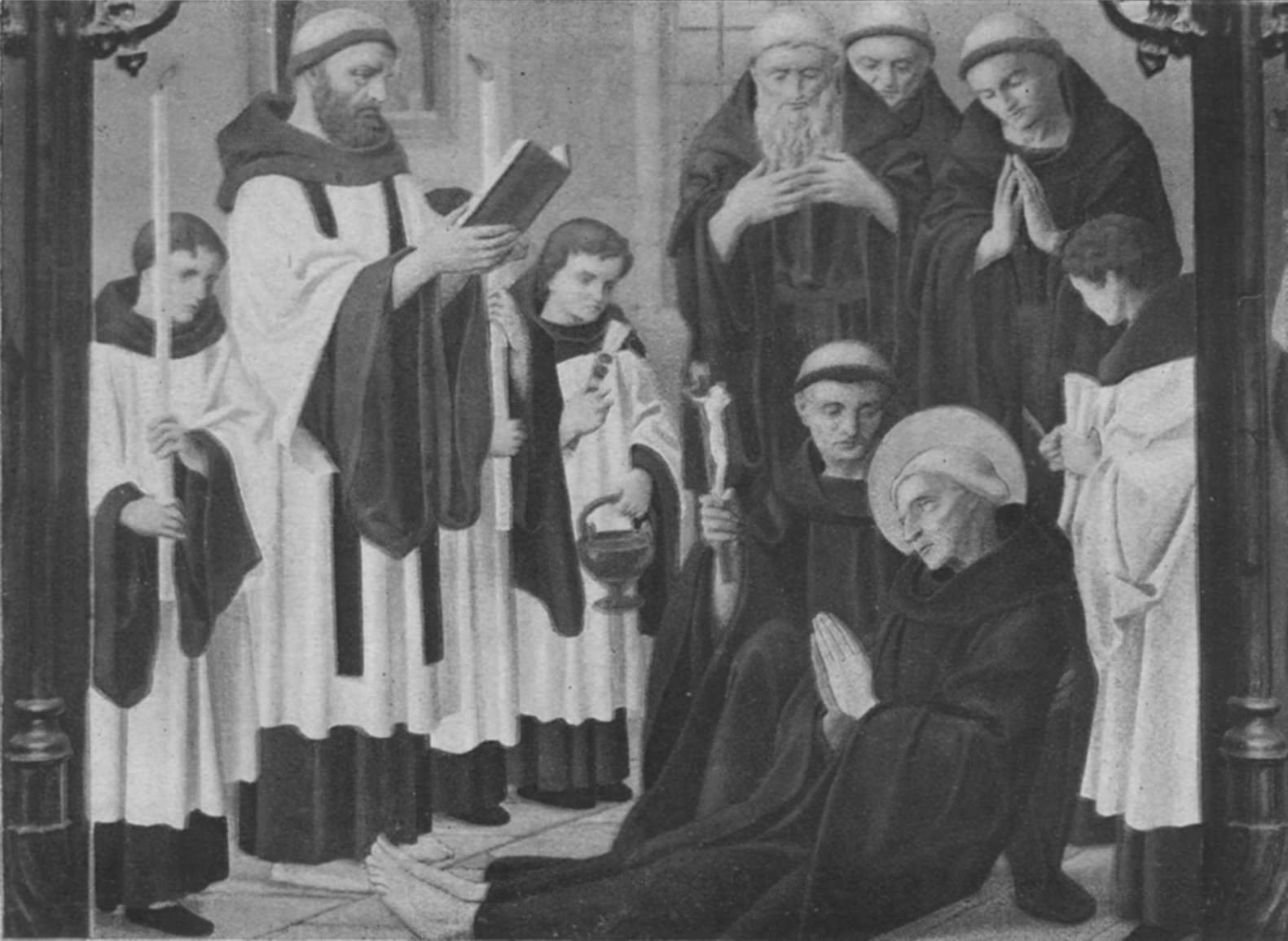
The Death of St Bede; the monastic clergy are wearing surplices over their cowls (original painting at St Cuthbert's College, Ushaw)

Clergy

- Nicholas Cardinal Wiseman – first Archbishop of Westminster
- Francis Cardinal Bourne – Archbishop of Westminster
- Arthur Cardinal Hinsley – Archbishop of Westminster
- William Cardinal Godfrey – Archbishop of Westminster
- John Carmel Cardinal Heenan – Archbishop of Westminster
- Rafael Cardinal Merry del Val y Zulueta – Cardinal Secretary of State
- Charles Petre Eyre – Archbishop of Glasgow.
- Louis Charles Casartelli – 4th Bishop of Salford
- Hugh Lindsay – 10th Bishop of Hexham and Newcastle
- James Chadwick – 2nd Bishop of Hexham and Newcastle
- Alexander Goss – Bishop of Liverpool
- Thomas Grant – Bishop of Southwark
- Mark Davies, Bishop of Shrewsbury
- John Lingard – author of The History Of England, From the First Invasion by the Romans to the Accession of Henry VIII
- Bernard Łubieński - Redemptorist missionary priest
- John Furniss – English Roman Catholic priest, known for his mission to children
- James Nugent – Roman Catholic priest of the Archdiocese of Liverpool
- Nicholas Rigby – English Roman Catholic priest and author of The Real Doctrine of the Church on Scripture
- Constantine Scollen – Irish Roman Catholic missionary priest and outstanding linguist in Canada in the mid- to late 19th century and author of Thirty Years among the Indians of the Northwest
- Paul Swarbrick - Bishop of Lancaster
- Philip Moger - Auxiliary Bishop of Southwark

Lay

- George Goldie – nineteenth-century ecclesiastical architect
- Edward Goldie – nineteenth- and twentieth-century ecclesiastical architect
- Alexander Martin Sullivan – Irish lawyer and defence counsel in the trial of Roger Casement
- Charles Napier Hemy – artist and Royal Academician
- Francis Thompson – English poet
- Joseph Gillow – author of Bibliographical Dictionary of the English Roman Catholics
- William Shee – first Roman Catholic to sit as a judge in England and Wales since the Reformation
- Francis Joseph Sloane (aka Francesco Giuseppe Sloane) - born 1794, died October 23, 1871, tutor at Ushaw and lifelong friend of Nicolas (later Cardinal) Wiseman, responsible for reviving the Montecatini Val di Cecina copper mine, which was the largest in Europe
- Paul Goggins – Labour Member of Parliament for Wythenshawe and Sale East and junior minister in the Northern Ireland Office.
- Joseph Scott – attorney in Los Angeles, founder of the Southwest Museum of the American Indian, vice-president of the Panama-Pacific International Exposition (1915)
- A.J. Hartley bestselling novelist and Shakespeare scholar
- Lafcadio Hearn (also known as Koizumi Yakumo) – author, best known for his books about Japan
- Francis Petre - prominent New Zealand-born architect designed the Cathedral of the Blessed Sacrament, Christchurch
- Peter Paul Pugin – English architect
- James Joseph Foy – Ontario Attorney General and political figure
- Myles William Patrick O'Reilly – Roman Catholic soldier and politician
- Archibald Matthias Dunn – Roman Catholic ecclesiastical architect
- Joe Tasker - Himalayan climber
- Charles Bruzon – Gibraltarian government minister and curate

== List of presidents ==
- 1794–1810 Thomas Eyre
- 1811–1828 John Gillow
- 1828–1833 Thomas Youens
- 1833–1836 John Briggs
- 1836–1837 Thomas Youens
- 1837–1863 Charles Newsham
- 1863–1876 Robert Tate
- 1876–1877 Francis Wilkinson
- 1877–1878 James Chadwick
- 1878–1885 William Wrennall
- 1885–1886 William Dunderdale
- 1886–1890 James Lennon
- 1890–1909 Thomas Wilkinson
- 1909–1910 Joseph Corbishley
- 1910–1934 William Brown
- 1934–1950 Charles Corbishley
- 1950–1967 Paul Grant
- 1967–1977 Philip Loftus
- 1977–1984 Peter Cookson
- 1984–1991 Peter Walton
- 1991–1997 Richard Atherton
- 1997–2003 James O’Keefe
- 2003–2008 Terence Drainey
- 2008–2011 John Marsland
