= William Maziere Brady =

Irish priest, ecclesiastical historian and journalist

William Maziere Brady (8 January 1825 – 19 March 1894) was an Irish priest, ecclesiastical historian and journalist who converted to Roman Catholicism from Anglicanism.

== Life ==
Born in Dublin, on 8 January 1825, he was a nephew of Sir Maziere Brady, 1st Baronet, Lord Chancellor of Ireland, and youngest son of Sir Nicholas W. Brady who, whilst Lord Mayor of Dublin, was knighted by King George IV during his visit to that city. His mother was Catherine Hodgson, daughter of Peter Hodgson, Comptroller of Customs for the Port of Dublin. William Maziere Brady entered Trinity College, Dublin, in 1842, received the degree of B.A. in 1848, B. D. in 1858, and D. D. in 1863.

In 1848, he was appointed Anglican curate of Maynooth and, in 1849, curate of Kilkeedy, County Limerick. In 1851, he became curate of St Dolough's, Dublin, and in the same year Rector of Farrahy, County Cork. In this year, also, he married Frances Walker, daughter of the late William Walker, attorney, of Mountjoy Place and High Park, Dublin, and Jane Marsh, who was descended from Jeremy Taylor. Brady acted as chaplain to several successive viceroys, and, in 1861, became Vicar of Clonfert, County Cork.

When the Irish Church Act 1869 was passed, Brady went to Rome, where he examined the Vatican archives for information touching the ecclesiastical affairs of England, Ireland, and Scotland. He shortly resigned his benefices as Vicar of Donoughpatrick, and Rector of Kilbery, County Meath, to which he had been promoted from Cork, and in May 1873, was received into the Catholic Church by Tobias Kirby, Rector of the Irish College at Rome. During his stay in Rome, he acted as correspondent of the London Tablet, and issued a pamphlet on The Pope's Anti-Parnellite Circular (London, 1883). He had a share in the political controversies of the day and corresponded with William Ewart Gladstone and other statesmen. He died of apoplexy in Rome, 19 March 1894, and was buried in the Campo Verano.

== Works ==
While at Clonfert he published in three volumes the "Clerical and Parochial Records of Cork, Cloyne and Ross" (Dublin, 1863), which he compiled from diocesan and parish registries and manuscripts in the principal libraries and public offices of Oxford, Dublin, and London, and from private and family papers. These "Records" are mainly those of the Protestant Diocese of Cork, Cloyne and Ross.

Brady published several works in favour of the disestablishment of the Irish Protestant Church, such as:

- "Remarks on the Irish Church Temporalities" (1865)
- "Facts or Fiction; The alleged Conversion of the Irish Bishops to the Reformed Religion at the Accession of Queen Elizabeth and the Assumed Descent of the Present Established Hierarchy from the Ancient Irish Church Disproved" (1866), which went through five editions
- "State Papers concerning the Irish Church in the time of Queen Elizabeth" (1868)
- "Some Remarks on the Irish Church Bill" (1869)
- "Essays on the English State Church in Ireland" (1869)

On the Irish Church question he also contributed numerous letters to the newspaper press, and articles to "Fraser's" and "The Contemporary", many of which were subsequently reprinted in pamphlet or book form. Some articles from his pen appeared in the "Catholic World":

- "Ireland's Mission" (May 1870)
- "The Ancient Irish Churches" (July 1870), written while yet a Protestant
- "Pius IX and Mr. Gladstone's Misrepresentations" (May 1875)

His Vatican researches led to the publication of two volumes on "Episcopal Succession in England, Scotland, and Ireland, A.D. 1400 to 1875, with Appointments to Monasteries, and Extracts from Manuscripts in Public and Private Libraries in Rome, Florence, Bologna, Vienna, and Paris" (Rome, 1876–77). He also brought out, "Annals of the Catholic Hierarchy in England and Scotland, A.D. 1585-1876, with a Dissertation on Anglican Orders" (Rome, 1877; London, 1883). The last of his works was the "Anglo-Roman Papers", published in 1890.

His only work of a purely secular character is "The McGillicuddy Papers; a Selection from the Family Archives of the McGillicuddy of the Reeks, with an Introductory Memoir" (1867).
