= Oscott =

Oscott may refer to:

- Oscott (ward), a local authority area in Birmingham, England
- Old Oscott, an area of Birmingham, England
- New Oscott, an area of Birmingham, England
- St Mary's College, Oscott, a Roman Catholic seminary
- Oscott Psalter, an illustrated psalter produced in the 13th century
