= English Martyrs School and Sixth Form College =

The English Martyrs Catholic School and Sixth Form College

Location
- Catcote Road, Hartlepool, TS25 4HA; 54°40′32″N 1°14′11″W

Information
- Type: Academy with faith designation
- Motto: Per Unitatem Virtus (Latin for Strength through unity )
- Religious affiliation: Catholic
- Established: 1973
- Local authority: Hartlepool Borough Council
- Department for Education URN: 140867 Tables
- Chair of Governors: Claire Harrison
- Executive Headteacher: Andrew Rodgers
- Gender: Coeducational
- Age: 11 to 18
- Enrolment: 1480
- Houses: 5 houses
- Colours: Red, black, gold & white
- Specialist School: Arts College; Young Enterprise centre of excellence 2011; British Council International School Award 2012-2015; Investor in People; Fair trade School; Healthy School
- Telephone Number: 01429 273790
- Website: https://ems.bhcet.org.uk/

The English Martyrs Catholic School and Sixth Form College is a secondary school and sixth form college located in Hartlepool with academy status. English Martyrs (referred to locally as "EMS" and "Martyrs") is the only Catholic secondary school in Hartlepool. The school and college are both located on the same site on Catcote Road, however, a newly built specialist sixth form block provides the majority of A-Level classes, as well as some 11–16 school lessons.

== History ==
St Joseph's Convent School was founded in 1885, and became a direct grant grammar school following the Education Act of 1944. St Francis RC Grammar School was opened in 1956, and two new secondary schools, St Bede's for boys and St Anne's for girls, were opened in 1963.

St Peter's secondary modern school opened in King Oswy Drive in 1960 replacing St Bega's school. The school had approximately 200 students and the headmasters were Timothy McCarthy, followed by Robert Garraghan.

In 1973, the national policy of Comprehensive education led to all the Catholic secondary schools in the town being merged as the English Martyrs' Comprehensive School. These were St Anne's, St Bede's, St Francis', St Joseph's and St Peter's schools, each of which is represented by a star on the school badge. The new site was the buildings of St Bede's and St Anne's and the St Francis site which was closed down in 1985.

=== List of previous headmasters ===
Previous headmasters include:

1. Canon John Bell (1973-1980). Bell was the first headmaster of English Martyrs, having previously been headmaster of the subsumed St Francis Grammar School.
2. David Relton (1980-1995)
3. Joseph Hughes (1995-2010
4. Michael Lee (2010–2015). Lee began his career at English Martyrs teaching history in 1977. Before being appointed head in September 2010, he had been head of sixth form and deputy headteacher.
5. Stephen Hammond (2015–2021)
6. Sara Crawshaw (2021–2024)
7. Colette Hogarth (2024–2025)
8. Andrew Rodgers (Executive Headteacher 2025–Present)
9. Glenn Thompson (Head of School 2025–Present)

== Statistics ==
The following statistics are summarised from the following Evening Gazette, Northern Echo and BBC News articles.
National averages are given in (italics) after the school's score.

Year	Number of children on the school roll	% eligible for free school meals	Value added score	Ratio of pupils to teachers	Total school spend per pupil / £	Budget spent on supply staff	% Gaining 5 A*-C GCSEs incl. English and Maths	% of pupils persistent / missing 15%+ of sessions	% of pupils staying on in any education	A/AS-Level performance (points)
2014-15	1,520	11.7% (13.9%)	1011.9 (1000)	14.1 (15)	(5,944)	-	-	4.2% (5.4%)	96.2% (90.2%)	-
2013-14	1,559	13.3% (15.7%)	993.7 (1000)	14 (15)	5,577 (5,856)	1%	62% (56.6%)	5% (5.3%)	-	-
2012-13	1,638	13.2% (16.3%)	1000.3 (1000)	14.9 (15.5)	5,677 (5,848)	1%	83% (59.2%)	5.53% (6.4%)	88.9% (88.3%)	-
2011-12	1,665	12.4% (16%)	995.5 (1000)	15 (15.6)	5,438 (6,058)	1%	68% (59.4%)	9.4% (6.8%)	90.6% (86%)	-
2010-11	1,700	-	997 (1000)	14.5 (16.3)	5,338 (5,051)	1%	72% (59%)	9.3% (9.5%)	91% (86%)	-
2009-10	-	-	-	-	4,945 (5,492)	1%	51% (53.5%)	3.7% (4.2%)	90.7% (84.7%)	-
2008-9	-	-	990.1 (1000)	-	-	-	66% (49.8%)	2.6% (5.9%)	-	793.2 (739.1)
2007-8	-	-	-	-	-	-	51% (47.6%)	-	-	820.3 (740)
2006-7	-	-	-	-	-	-	54% (46.3%)	-	-	789.7 (731.2)
2005-6	-	-	-	-	-	-	51% (45.6%)	-	-	773.7 (721.5)

=== Gazette ratings ===
Date	Overall score	Overall rating	Rank / out of x state schools	Local rank	Attainment	Teaching	Behaviour	Attendance	Outcomes
July 2016	61.10	4/5 stars	637 / 3,109	1	4/5 stars	3/5 stars	-	4/5 stars	5/5 stars
July 2015	48.18	3/5 stars	1,569 / 3,123	12	3/5 stars	2/5 stars	-	3/5 stars	3/5 stars
July 2014	58.72	4/5 stars	809	2	5/5 stars	3/5 stars	-	3/5 stars	4/5 stars
September 2013	55.37	3/5 stars	1,194 / 3,079	1	4/5 stars	3/5 stars	2/5 stars	-	4/5 stars

=== Ofsted ratings ===
Date	School part	Overall effectiveness	Outcomes, Achievement/ and standards	Behaviour and safety	Personal development and well being	Quality of provision/teaching	Leadership and management
17 May 2017	School Overall	Requires Improvement	Requires Improvement	Good		Requires Improvement	Requires Improvement
17 May 2017	Sixth Form	Good	-	-	-	-	-
25 January 2012	School Overall	Good	Good	Good	-	Good	Good
18 March 2009	School Overall	Good	Good	-	Outstanding	Good	Good
18 March 2009	Sixth Form	Outstanding	Outstanding	-	Outstanding	Outstanding	Outstanding
5 October 2000	School Overall	Good	Good	-	Outstanding	Good	Good
5 October 2000	Sixth Form	Good	Satisfactory	-	Outstanding	Good	Good

== Intake ==
=== Main school ===
The majority of secondary school students come from 6 feeder primary schools:

- Sacred Heart School
- St. Bega's School
- St. Cuthbert's school
- St. John Vianney's School
- St. Joseph's School
- St. Teresa's School

=== Sixth form ===
- Pupils who obtain 5 grade Cs or better at GCSE can choose any Level 3 course i.e. an A Level or an Applied A Level course
- Pupils who obtain 4 grade Cs or above at GCSE are advised to follow a double award Applied A Level course, plus additional AS subject/s
- Pupils who obtain fewer than 4 grade Cs at GCSE are advised to follow a Level 2 course – either the BTEC First Diploma in Business or in Health and Social Care

== Annual school events ==
=== Annual awards evening principal guests 1981-2012 ===
A tradition of the school since 1981 where awards are given to students of both the school and sixth form college. Recognition is given to achievement at GCSE, 'A' level and GNVQ levels."

=== Annual John Bell Lecture ===
This once-a-year lecture is usually given around March in the school's St Anne's hall. The lecture is in honour of Canon John Bell, the last headmaster of St Francis and the first headmaster of the new English Martyrs school.

=== Principal guests, school shows and John Bell Lecturers ===
Academic Year Start	Awards Evening Principal Guest	School Show	John Bell Lecturer	Headteacher
2017	TBA	Annie	TBA	Stephen Hammond
2016	Craig Hignett	Little Shop of Horrors	Tony Green, former Royal Marine and Police Officer	Stephen Hammond
2015	Gary Pallister	The Sound of Music	Michael Lee, former-headmaster of the school (2010–2015)	Stephen Hammond
2014	Jeff Stelling	The Wizard of Oz	Daniel Robinson, Alumnus and only non-American to have flown the F-22 Raptor fighter jet.	Michael Lee
2013	Graham Onions	Jesus Christ Superstar	David Eagle, Alumnus and member of the sea shanty band the Young Uns	Michael Lee
2012	Stuart Whincup, BBC Look North, with special guest Savannah Marshall.	Beauty and the Beast	Chris Joseph, Alumnus and autobiographer	Michael Lee
2011	Tony Mowbray	We Will Rock You	Jez Lowe, Alumnus and folk musician	Michael Lee
2010	Séamus Cunningham, Bishop of Hexham and Newcastle	Les Misérables	Anne, Tony and Declan Stokle	Michael Lee
2009	Philippa Gregory	Oliver!	Father Phil Marsh	Joe Hughes
2008	Wendy Gibson, BBC Look North	Grease	Joy Yates, Editor of the Hartlepool Mail	Joe Hughes
2007	Peter Beardsley MBE	Joseph and the Amazing Technicolor Dreamcoat		Joe Hughes
2006	Jonny Wilkinson OBE	Bugsy Malone	Chris Gorman OBE, Alumnus and entrepreneur	Joe Hughes
2005	Kevin Dunn, Bishop of Hexham and Newcastle	The Wiz		Joe Hughes
2004	Lord Puttnam CBE FRSA	Little Shop of Horrors		Joe Hughes
2003	Lord Alton of Liverpool			Joe Hughes
2002	Lady Tanni Grey-Thompson DBE			Joe Hughes
2001	Niall Quinn			Joe Hughes
2000	Simon Weston OBE			Joe Hughes
1999	Philip Madoc			Joe Hughes
1998	Kevin Whately		Ann Widdecombe DSG PC, Shadow Home Secretary	Joe Hughes
1997	Tessa Sanderson CBE			Joe Hughes
1996	Ronnie Corbett CBE			Joe Hughes
1995	Bob Holness	Journey to the Center of the Earth		Joe Hughes
1994	Sir Ron Norman OBE DL and Lady Norman			David Relton
1993	Susan Cunliffe-Lister, Countess of Swinton DSG DL Baroness Masham of Ilton			David Relton
1992	Ambrose Griffiths, Bishop of Hexham and Newcastle		Peter Mandelson PC, MP for Hartlepool	David Relton
1991	Jeremy Beadle MBE			David Relton
1990	Frank Carson KSG	The Boy Friend		David Relton
1989	Sir John Hall	Oklahoma!		David Relton
1988	Sir Cyril Smith MBE			David Relton
1987	Peter Egan			David Relton
1986	Cardinal Basil Hume			David Relton
1985	Major Sir Denis Thatcher MBE TD	My Fair Lady		David Relton
1984	David Bellamy OBE	Calamity Jane		David Relton
1983	Brian Clough OBE			David Relton
1982	Lord Longford KG PC			David Relton
1981	Miles Fitzalan-Howard, 17th Duke of Norfolk			David Relton
1980	New creation.			David Relton
1979	New creation.			John Bell
1978	New creation.			John Bell
1977	New creation.			John Bell
1976	New creation.			John Bell
1975	New creation.			John Bell
1974	New creation.			John Bell
1973	New creation.			John Bell
School founded.

== Notable alumni ==
- Paul Arnison, former professional footballer with over 350 professional appearances
- Lewis Cope, actor and dancer
- Pete Donaldson, radio presenter and podcast host
- Kieran Bew, TV, film and stage actor. Kieran attended alongside his brother Duncan who works as a doctor at King's College Hospital.
- Matthew Dolan, professional footballer whose former clubs include Middlesbrough, Hartlepool United and Bradford City
- Janick Gers, guitarist in Iron Maiden who opened the school's new music block in 2007
- Michael Gough, retired cricketer and cricket umpire (umpire of the year 2011, 2012, 2013, 2014 and 2015)
- Peter Hartley, retired professional footballer and former Hartlepool United captain
- Michael Hunter, British, European and Commonwealth Bantamweight Boxing Champion
- Andy Linighan, retired professional footballer and scorer of the winning goal in the 1993 FA Cup Final who attended along with his brothers who were also footballers, Brian Linighan and David Linighan.
- Jemma Lowe, Olympic swimmer
- Savannah Marshall, Olympic boxer and boxing world champion
- Philip Middlemiss, actor and businessman
- Professor Gerard Parkin FRSC, Professor of Chemistry, Columbia University
- Kevin Walsh, Paralympic swimming bronze medallist
