= Stephen Wright (bishop) =

British Catholic bishop

The Right Reverend Stephen Wright
- Bishop of Hexham and Newcastle
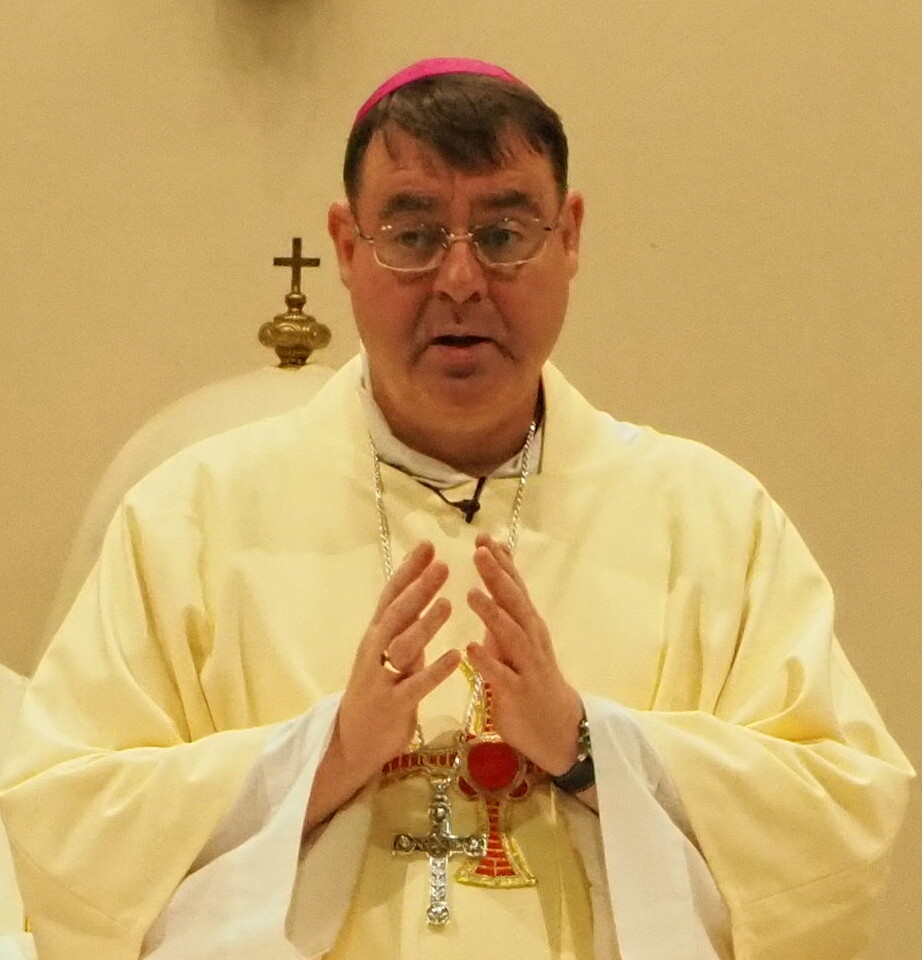
- Wright in 2023
- Church: Roman Catholic Church
- Province: Liverpool
- Diocese: Hexham and Newcastle
- See: Hexham and Newcastle
- Appointed: 14 June 2023
- Predecessor: Robert Byrne
- Previous posts: Auxiliary Bishop in Birmingham (2020-2023); Titular Bishop of Ramsbiria

Orders
- Ordination: 9 September 2000 by Vincent Gerard Nichols
- Consecration: 9 October 2020 by Bernard Longley

Personal details
- Born: Stephen James Lawrence Wright; 9 October 1970 (age 56) Stafford, United Kingdom
- Denomination: Roman Catholic
- Education: St Mary's College, Oscott; Venerable English College; Pontifical Gregorian University

Ordination history of Stephen Wright
History
Priestly ordination
- Ordained by: Vincent Gerard Nichols
Episcopal consecration
- Principal consecrator: Bernard Longley
- Co-consecrators: David Christopher McGough; William Kenney

Stephen James Lawrence Wright (born 9 October 1970) is a British Roman Catholic prelate. Since 2023, he has served as Bishop of Hexham and Newcastle.

== Biography ==
Wright was born on 9 October 1970 in Stafford in the Archdiocese of Birmingham. He was ordained a priest on 9 September 2000 for the same Archdiocese. After graduating in Law and qualifying to practice as a lawyer, he completed his ecclesiastical studies at seminary of St Mary's College, Oscott in Birmingham and at the Venerable English College in Rome. He obtained a licentiate in theology at the Pontifical Gregorian University.

He has held the following offices: parish vicar of Corpus Christi Parish in Stechford, Birmingham (2000–2003); pastor of Saint Joseph's in Banbury (2003–2007); parish priest of Saint Mary and Modwen in Burton-on-Trent, Staffordshire (2007–2019); episcopal vicar for religious (2012–2019); and from 2019, Vicar general.

On 18 March 2020 he was appointed titular bishop of "Ramsbiria" (the Latin name of Ramsbury) and auxiliary in Birmingham, receiving episcopal consecration on the following 9 October.

On 14 June 2023 he was appointed by Pope Francis as Bishop of Hexham and Newcastle, succeeding Robert Byrne. He was installed at St Mary's Cathedral in Newcastle on 19 July 2023.

Catholic Church titles
Preceded by Robert Byrne	Bishop of Hexham and Newcastle; 2023 to present	Incumbent
