= Owen Swindlehurst =

Catholic bishop (1928–1995)

The Right Reverend Owen Francis Swindlehurst (10 May 1928 – 28 August 1995) was Auxiliary Bishop of the Roman Catholic Diocese of Hexham and Newcastle and Titular Bishop of Cuncacestre under Bishops Hugh Lindsay and Ambrose Griffiths from 1977 until his death.

Born at Newburn, he studied in Rome and was ordained to the priesthood on 11 July 1954, aged 26. On 10 June 1977, aged 49, he was appointed Auxiliary Bishop of Hexham and Newcastle by Pope Paul VI, and nominated to the titular see of Cuncacestre (St Cuthbert's or Chester-le-Street). He was consecrated on 25 July 1977 at St Mary's Cathedral, Newcastle upon Tyne. Together with retiring Bishop Hugh Lindsay he acted as one of the principal co-consecrating bishops at the Episcopal Ordination of Abbot Ambrose Griffiths, who became the twelfth Bishop of Hexham and Newcastle.

Bishop Swindlehurst died on 28 August 1995, aged 67, and was buried at Our Blessed Lady Immaculate, Washington, Tyne and Wear. He had been a priest for 41 years and a bishop for 18 years.
