= David Evans (bishop) =

David Evans (bishop) may refer to:

- David Evans (Anglican bishop) (born 1938), British Anglican bishop in Peru
- David Evans (Catholic bishop) (born 1953), English Roman Catholic bishop
