= Maryvale Institute =

College in Birmingham, England

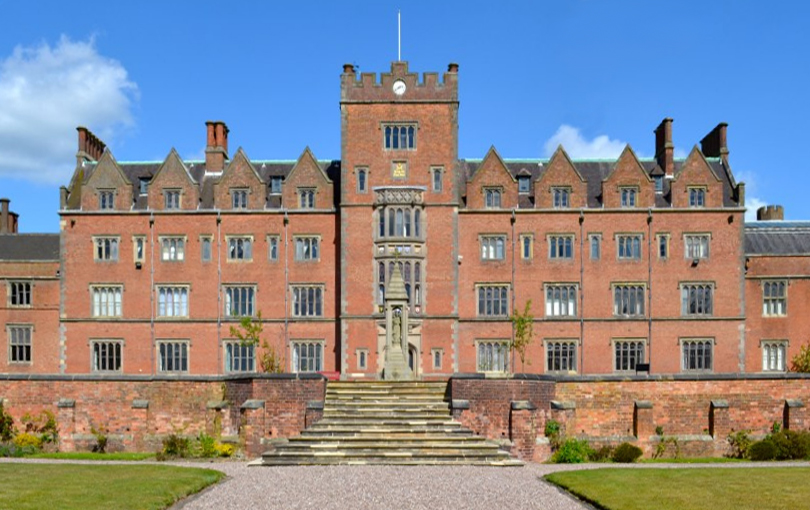
- Maryvale Institute's new home at St Mary's College, Oscott.
- Motto: Audite Insulae
- Type: Roman Catholic
- Established: 1980
- Affiliations: Faculté de Notre Dame, Paris; Liverpool Hope University; The Open University
- President: The Most Rev Bernard Longley
- Director: Dcn Dr Harry Schnitker MA, PhD, Obl.O.Ss.S.
- Location: St Mary's College, Oscott, Chester Road, Sutton Coldfield, B73 5AA, UK, Birmingham, England; 52°32′49″N 1°51′14″W
- Website: www.maryvale.ac.uk

Maryvale Institute is a college of further and higher education, an International Catholic Distance-Learning College for Catechesis, Theology, Philosophy and Religious Education, was formerly based at Maryvale House, Old Oscott, Great Barr, Birmingham, England, but has been delivering its programmes from St Mary's College Oscott since Autumn 2025. It specialises in the provision of part-time, distance learning courses to the lay faithful, consecrated religious and ministers of the Roman Catholic Church.

== History ==
The College has existed in its current state since 1980, when it was established by Archbishop George Patrick Dwyer, on the site of St Mary's College, founded in 1794 for both the training of priests and the education of lay pupils. It was also, at one stage, the home of Saint John Henry Newman.

In 2024, in a new venture with St Mary's University Twickenham, Maryvale@StMary's, the BA Philosophy and the Catholic Tradition, MA in Catholic Applied Theologyand PhD in Theology began to be delivered at St Mary's University.

From Autumn 2025, Maryvale Higher Institute of Religious Sciences (HIRS) began a closer alignment with St Mary's College Oscott. While Maryvale remains separate and autonomous from the seminary, it delivers its distance-learning HIRS programmes (Ecclesiastical Bachelor of Divinity and Licence in Catechetics) from the college and benefits from its resources when students visit.

== Courses offered ==
=== Higher Education – Undergraduate ===
- Bachelor of Arts in Philosophy and the Catholic Tradition (Maryvale@StMarys, St Mary's University Twickenham)
- Ecclesiastical Bachelor of Divinity (Maryvale Institute HIRS, validated by Faculté-Notre Dame, Paris)

=== Higher Education – Postgraduate ===
- MA in Catholic Applied Theology (Maryvale@StMarys, St Mary's University Twickenham)
- Licence in Divinity: Pathway in Catechetical Sciences (validated by Faculté-Notre Dame, Paris)

=== Research Degrees ===
- PhD in Theology (Maryvale@StMarys, St Mary's University Twickenham)

== Institute relationships ==
The Institute is located in the Archdiocese of Birmingham (UK), its president being the Most Reverend Bernard Longley, Archbishop of Birmingham. In 2011 Maryvale under new guidelines from the Vatican became the first Higher Institute of Religious Sciences in English-speaking world, and became associated with Notre Dame ecclesiastic faculty. Its Bachelor of Arts, MA and Doctoral (PhD) programmes are delivered through Maryvale@StMary's and are accredited by St Mary's University Twickenham (London). The validator of the Bachelor of Divinity and Licence in Catechetics programmes is the Faculté-Notre Dame, at the École Cathédrale de Paris.

== Notable people ==
=== Lecturers ===
- Robert Letellier, cultural historian and academic
- Andrew Pinsent, theologian and scientist
