= David Evans (Catholic bishop) =

English Catholic bishop (born 1953)

His Excellency, The Right Reverend David Ernest Charles Evans
- Auxiliary Bishop of Birmingham
- Church: Catholic Church
- Archdiocese: Birmingham
- Appointed: 18 March 2020
- Other posts: Episcopal Vicar for Birmingham and Worcester (since 2019); Titular Bishop of Cuncacestre (2020–present)

Orders
- Ordination: 29 July 1978 by Patrick Leo McCartie
- Consecration: 9 October 2020 by Bernard Longley

Personal details
- Born: 22 October 1953 (age 72) Henley-on-Thames, Oxfordshire, England
- Education: Venerable English College; Pontifical Gregorian University

David Ernest Charles Evans (born 22 October 1953) is an English Catholic prelate who has served as an auxiliary bishop of the Archdiocese of Birmingham and titular bishop of Cuncacestre since 2020.

== Early life and education ==
Evans was born on 22 October 1953 in Henley-on-Thames, Oxfordshire, England. He studied for the priesthood at the Venerable English College in Rome and obtained licentiates in philosophy and theology from the Pontifical Gregorian University.

== Priestly ministry ==
Evans was ordained to the priesthood for the Archdiocese of Birmingham on 29 July 1978 by Bishop Patrick Leo McCartie.

He served as assistant priest at St Mary's, Walsall (1979–1981), and St Aloysius, Oxford (1981–1983). He was subsequently formator and vice-rector of St Mary's College, Oscott, from 1983 to 2001. From 2001 to 2006 he served as parish priest of St Austin's, Stafford, before becoming episcopal vicar for Coventry, Warwickshire and Oxfordshire (2006–2007). Between 2007 and 2012 he was parish priest of St Theresa's, Chalbury, Oxfordshire. In 2014 he became parish priest of Our Lady of Perpetual Succour, Rednal, and in 2019 was appointed episcopal vicar for Birmingham and Worcester.

Evans has also served on the English Anglican–Catholic Committee and the Bishops' Conference Committee for Faith and Culture, and is a member of the Bishops' Conference Department for Dialogue and Unity.

== Episcopal ministry ==
On 18 March 2020, Pope Francis appointed Evans auxiliary bishop of Birmingham and titular bishop of Cuncacestre.

He received episcopal consecration on 9 October 2020 at St Chad's Cathedral, Birmingham, from Archbishop Bernard Longley, with Bishops David McGough and William Kenney serving as co-consecrators.
