= Cuncacestre =

Titular See of Cuncacestre Sancti Cuthberti Chester-le-Street

Location
- Country: England
- Ecclesiastical province: Birmingham
- Metropolitan: Birmingham

Information
- Denomination: Roman Catholic
- Rite: Latin Rite
- Established: 882 (moved to Durham 995)
- Patron saint: Saint Cuthbert

Current leadership
- Pope: Leo XIV
- Bishop: Stephen Wright
- Metropolitan Archbishop: Bernard Longley

Cuncacestre (Chester-le-Street) was a seat of the Anglo Saxon Bishop of Lindisfarne, and subsists as a Roman Catholic titular see.

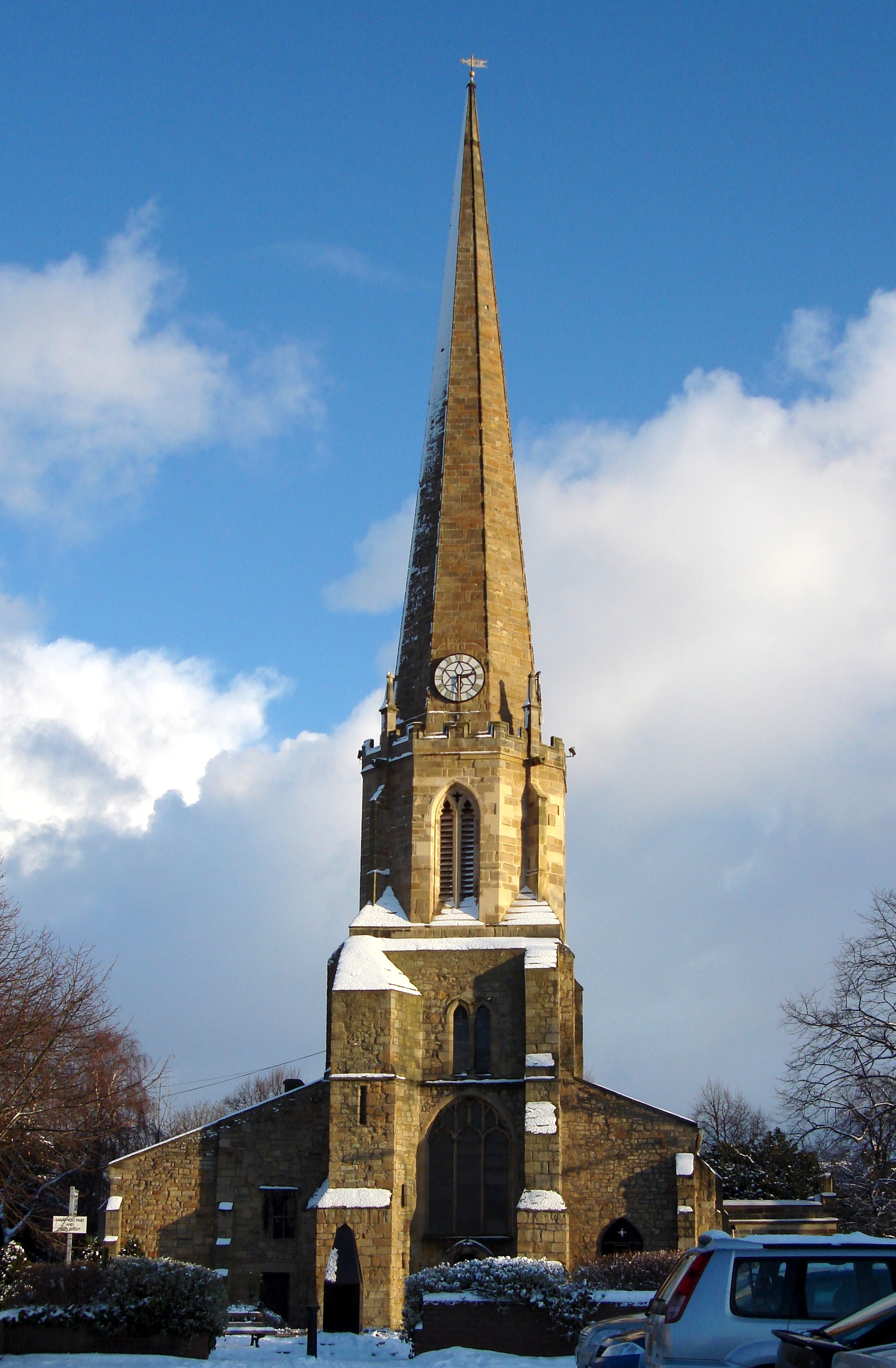
Church of St Mary and St Cuthbert, which is built on the site of the Cathedral of Cuncacestre

== Start of the Diocese ==
The church was established to house the body of Cuthbert of Lindisfarne, Bishop of Lindisfarne from 684 to 687. After his death he became one of the most venerated saints of the time, with a significant cultus and the Venerable Bede writing both a verse and prose biography of him. So when driven out of Lindisfarne by Viking raids in 875 the monks, led by Eardulf of Lindisfarne, took St Cuthbert's coffin along with other valuable items, including the Lindisfarne Gospels. They wandered for seven years.

They eventually settled at Chester-le-Street (then called Cunecaster or Conceastre), at the site of the old Roman fort of Concangis, in 883, on land granted to them by Guthred.

They built a wooden church and shrine for St Cuthbert's relics, dedicating it to St Mary and St Cuthbert. Though there was no shortage of stone in the ruins of Concangis they did not build a stone church; it has been suggested they did not intend to stay for as long as they eventually did. It was built within the Roman fort, which although abandoned over five hundred years before may have still offered some protection, as well as access north and south along Cade's Road and to the sea by the River Wear.

== Centre of Christianity ==
Cuncacestre was the centre of Christianity for much of the northeast, because it was the seat of the Bishop of Lindisfarne, making the church a cathedral. The diocese stretched between the boundaries of Danelaw at Teesside in the south, of Alba at Lothian in the north and the Irish Sea in the west. The bishop's authority was confirmed by Alfred the Great, and for the next 112 years the community was based here, visited by kings Athelstan and Edmund who both left gifts for the community, to add to the treasures brought from Lindisfarne.

Most notable among their treasures were the Lindisfarne Gospels, created in Lindisfarne around 715. They were bought with the monks after they left Lindisfarne. While here they were translated from Latin into English, sometime between 947 and 968, by bishop Aldred writing a gloss in Old English above the text, making them the oldest surviving English translation of the Gospels.

The Gospels and St Cuthbert's coffin were important relics for the diocese and the monks.

== Transfer to Durham ==
Viking raids renewed under the reign of Ethelred II. In 995 Bishop Aldhun again found himself vulnerable to Danish attack and fled with St. Cuthbert's body to Ripon.

Danegeld was paid again and peace was restored. Aldhun was on his way through Durham to reestablish the see at Chester-le-Street when he received a divine vision that the body of St Cuthbert should remain in Durham. A stone chapel was built to receive the remains of St. Cuthbert's body and Aldhun began a great church on the site of Durham Cathedral, which was finished and consecrated in 999. The see and diocese of Lindisfarne (and Cuncacestre) was moved to Durham and the bishop's title became Bishop of Durham, with Aldhun becoming the first Bishop of Durham.

The wooden church remained in place until replaced by a stone church in the mid 11th century, and is now the Church of St Mary and St Cuthbert.

== Titular see ==
Since 2020, the titular see of Cuncacestre has been held by David Evans, an auxiliary bishop in the Archdiocese of Birmingham.

The titular see, recreated in 1969, was previously held by Bishop Robert Byrne (2014-2019), later Bishop of Hexham and Newcastle, and Bishop Alan Hopes from 2003 until his appointment to the See of East Anglia in 2013, and before that had been held by Hugh Lindsay (1969-1974), later Bishop of Hexham and Newcastle, and Owen Swindlehurst (1977-1995).

== Citations ==
- Gerald Bonner; David Rollason; Clare Stancliffe, eds. (1989). St Cuthbert, His Cult and His Community to 1200. Woodbridge: Boydell Press. ISBN 0-85115-610-X.
- Low Low, John (1881). Durham. Society for Promoting Christian Knowledge. OCLC 384311.
- Selkirk, Raymond (2000). Chester-le-Street & Its Place in History. Birtley, County Durham: Casdec Print & Design Centre. ISBN 1-900456-05-2.
- Simeon of Durham; Stevenson, Joseph (1855). The Historical Works of Simeon of Durham.
