= Kevin Kenney =

American Catholic prelate (born 1959)

His Excellency, The Most Reverend Kevin Kenney
- Auxiliary Bishop of Saint Paul and Minneapolis
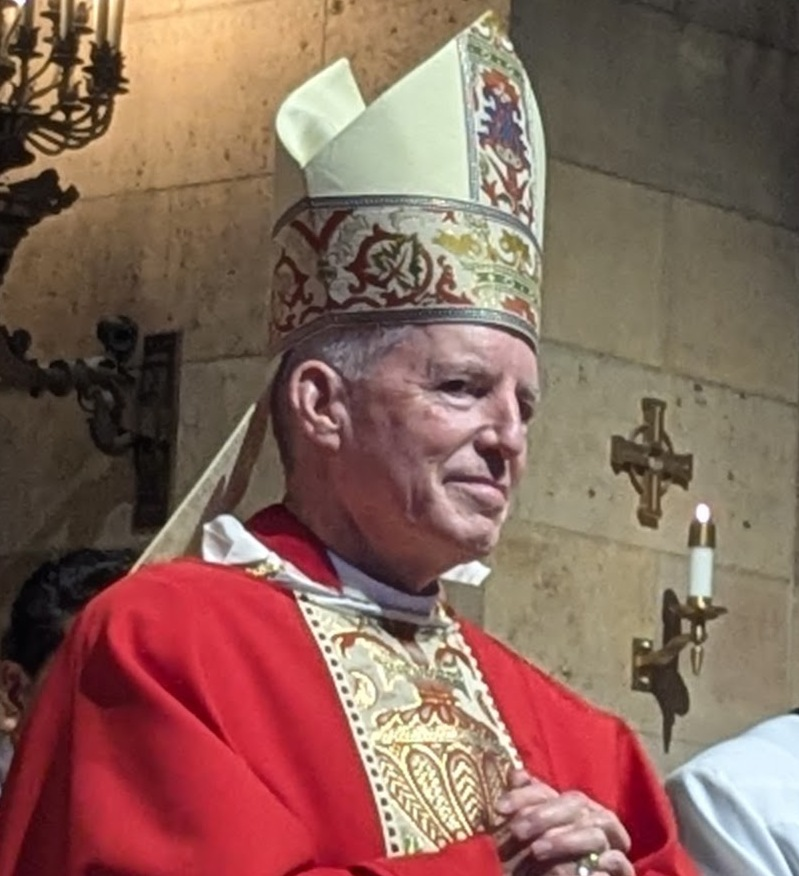
- Kenney in 2024 at his episcopal consecration
- Archdiocese: Saint Paul and Minneapolis
- Appointed: July 25, 2024
- Installed: October 28, 2024
- Other post: Titular Bishop of Cunavia

Orders
- Ordination: May 28, 1994 by John Roach
- Consecration: October 28, 2024 by Bernard Hebda, Peter F. Christensen, and James Golka

Personal details
- Born: December 29, 1959 (age 66) Minneapolis, Minnesota, US
- Education: DeLaSalle High School; College of Saint Thomas; Catholic Theological Union; Saint Paul Seminary
- Motto: The love of Christ impels us
- Styles
- Azure, three pallets wavy Argent, overall to dexter the Tower of Saint Kevin Or and to sinister a Greek Celtic cross Or, charged at the center with a dove overt Argent; on a chief Or flanked to dexter by a Rose Gules, barbed and seeded Proper, and to sinister by a sheaf of wheat Or and a bunch of grapes, Purpure, leaved Vert together, the Sacred Heart of Jesus Gules, crowned and wounded Proper, enflamed Or. The shield ensigned with an episcopal cross Or behind the shield and a bishop’s galero Vert cords and twelve tassels disposed in three rows of one, two and three all Vert. On a scroll below the shield the motto: "The Love of Christ Impels Us".
- Reference style: His Excellency; The Most Reverend
- Spoken style: Your Excellency
- Religious style: Bishop

Kevin Thomas Kenney (born December 29, 1959) is an American Catholic prelate serving as an auxiliary bishop for the Archdiocese of Saint Paul and Minneapolis since 2024. Kenney was born and raised in Minneapolis and attended DeLaSalle High School in Minneapolis and the College of Saint Thomas in St. Paul. After spending time as a Claretian, Kenney was ordained as a priest of Saint Paul and Minneapolis on May 28, 1994. He was named an auxiliary bishop on July 25, 2024, and consecrated on October 28, 2024.

== Biography ==
=== Early life ===
Kenney was born on December 29, 1959, to William and Dorothy Kenney and is the fifth of eight children. He attended DeLaSalle High School in Minneapolis, where he graduated in 1978. He received a Bachelor of Arts degree in business administration and Spanish from the College of Saint Thomas in St. Paul. Through his time in high school and college, Kenney worked numerous odd jobs, including paper carrier, janitor, dishwasher, and drink vendor at the Metrodome in Minneapolis.

After his college graduation, Kenney moved to Chicago to work with the Claretians as a lay volunteer. After two years, they hired him as their program director. After another two years, he entered formation with the Claretians and began to attend the Catholic Theological Union in Chicago, where he received a Master of Divinity degree. After five years of formation with the Claretians, he left the community and applied as a seminarian for the Archdiocese of Saint Paul and Minneapolis, where he attended Saint Paul Seminary.

=== Priesthood ===
Kenney was ordained a priest at the Cathedral of Saint Paul for the Archdiocese of Saint Paul and Minneapolis by Archbishop John Roach on May 28, 1994.

After his ordination, the archdiocese assigned Kenney as parochial vicar at Saint Olaf Parish in Minneapolis from 1994 to 1998, as pastor of Our Lady of Peace Parish in Minneapolis from 1998 to 2004, as pastor of Our Lady of Guadalupe Parish in Saint Paul from 2004 to 2015, and as pastor of both Saint Michael in Kenyon and Divine Mercy Parishes in Faribault from 2015 to 2019, before his assignment as pastor of Saint Olaf in 2019.

Fluent in Spanish, Kenney served as the archdiocese's vicar for Latino ministry from 2010 to 2018. He has also served as an adjunct professor of theology at the University of Saint Thomas. In 2021, former Minneapolis police officer Derek Chauvin was on trial for the 2020 murder of George Floyd. Throughout the trial, Kenney led a daily prayer service at St. Olaf Church calling for healing and peace in the community.

=== Auxiliary Bishop of Saint Paul and Minneapolis ===
On July 25, 2024, Pope Francis appointed Kenney as auxiliary bishop of Saint Paul and Minneapolis and titular bishop of Cunavia. On receiving the phone call from the apostolic nuncio, Christophe Pierre, announcing the appointment, Kenney was hesitant to accept it. This was because he was already 64 years old and thinking about retirement. However, after reflecting on the daily readings of the week, he told Pierre that he would take the position.

Kenney was consecrated a bishop at the Cathedral of Saint Paul on October 28, 2024, by Archbishop Bernard Hebda, with Bishops Peter F. Christensen and James R. Golka as principal co-consecrators. Golka and Christensen had attended seminary with Kenney.

== See also ==
- Catholic Church hierarchy
- Catholic Church in the United States
- Historical list of the Catholic bishops of the United States
- List of Catholic bishops of the United States
- Lists of patriarchs, archbishops, and bishops

== Episcopal succession ==
Catholic Church titles
| Preceded by - | Auxiliary Bishop of Saint Paul and Minneapolis; 2024-Present | Succeeded by - |
