= Chunavia =

Coastal region in central Albania

Chunavia is the name of coastal region in central Albania and former bishopric in the country, now a Latin Catholic titular see. It was one of the oldest medieval bishoprics in Albania, located at the coastal region between Durrës and the mouth of the Mat (near Fushë Kuqe).

== History ==
The city in the former Roman province of Epirus Nova was important enough to become a suffragan of its capital Durrës's Metropolitan see circa 1300 AD, known in Latin as Cunavia, only to be suppressed again circa 1470.

=== Titular see ===
The diocese was nominally restored in 1933 as a titular bishopric.

It has had the following incumbents, of the lowest (episcopal) rank :

- Joseph Brendan Houlihan, Saint Patrick's Society for the Foreign Missions (S.P.S.) (1970.10.19 – 1971.04.24)
- André Gustave Bossuyt (1971.08.03 – 1974.07.30)
- Szilárd Keresztes (1975.01.07 – 1988.06.30)
- Guy Marie Alexandre Thomazeau (1988.11.12 – 1994.09.14) as Auxiliary Bishop of Meaux (France) (1988.11.12 – 1994.09.14), later Coadjutor Bishop of Beauvais (France) (1994.09.14 – 1995.05.13) succeeding as Bishop of Beauvais (1995.05.13 – 2002.08.28), Bishop of Montpellier (France) (2002.08.28 – 2002.12.08), promoted Metropolitan Archbishop of Montpellier (2002.12.08 – 2011.06.03), Apostolic Administrator of Nice (France) (2013.08.08 – 2014.03.06)
- Murphy Nicholas Xavier Pakiam (1995.04.01 – 2003.05.24) as Auxiliary Bishop of Kuala Lumpur (1995.04.01 – 2003.05.24), later succeeding as Metropolitan Archbishop of Kuala Lumpur (Malaysia) (2003.05.24 – 2013.12.13), also President of Catholic Bishops’ Conference of Malaysia, Singapore and Brunei (2007.02 – 2011.01.01), vice-president of Catholic Bishops’ Conference of Malaysia, Singapore and Brunei (2012.08? – ...)
- Walter Allison Hurley (2003.07.07 – 2005.06.21)
- David Christopher McGough (2005.10.25 – 2023.03.26), Auxiliary Bishop of Birmingham (England)
- Kevin Kenney (2024.07.25 – ...), Auxiliary Bishop of Saint Paul and Minneapolis (U.S.A.)

== Bibliography ==
- GigaCatholic with titular incumbent biography links
  - Macrides, Ruth (2007). George Akropolites: The History: Introduction, Translation and Commentary. Oxford University Press. ISBN 978-0199210671.
