= St Francis Roman Catholic Grammar School =

St Francis RC Grammar School
- Hartlepool, County Durham; England

Information
- Motto: Cervus ad Fontes (Latin for The Hart to the Font)
- Religious affiliation: Roman Catholic
- Established: 1956
- Founder: Father Francis Dunne
- Closed: 1973
- Gender: Boys
- Houses: 4 houses
- Final Headmaster: Canon Bell
- Diocese: Hexham and Newcastle

St Francis RC Grammar School, also known as St Francis Xavier Grammar School, was a Catholic grammar school for boys, in Hartlepool, County Durham, England. It opened on 17 September 1956 and was subsumed into The English Martyrs School and Sixth Form College along with St Joseph's Convent School and four more local Catholic schools in 1973. It was run by the Xaverian Brothers.

== Head Teachers ==
Headteacher	Start year	End year
Brother Anselm BA	1956	undated
Canon John "Dickie" Bell.	undated	1973

== Teachers and Brothers ==
Teacher	Subject(s)	Additional notes
Father John Bell	Latin	Became a Canon and Headmaster of both St Francis and later The English Martyrs School and Sixth Form College.
Brother Aiden	RK	
Brother Ambrose	Latin	history
Brother Brendan	unknown	
Brother Chrysostum	unknown	
Brother Cuthbert	Maths and Football	
Brother Robert	French	
Brother Osmund	Geography	
Brother Oswald	unknown	
Brother Plunkett	history music '	
Mrs Shirley Corcoran	Biology	First full-time female teacher at the school.
Mr Wm. Lawford BSc	physics	
Mr Chris Lawton	Chemistry and Geography	
Mr Gilles Legal	French & Russian	
Mr Patrick (Paddy) Alley.	Maths and Rugby	
Mr Ian Bewick	Art	
Mr David Hudson	Chemistry	
Father Fred Martin	English	
Mr Jack McCabe	P.E.	
Father Frank McCabe	Latin	
Mr Derek Mylroi	Geography	
Mr Patrick Naughton	English	
Mr Vin Shanley	History	Later became Headmaster at St Michael's Roman Catholic School in Billingham as well as publishing several books containing "hilarious stories".
Mr David Turley	Maths	
Mrs Bell	Dinner Lady	

== Houses ==
There were four houses within the school: Percy, Swalwell, Errington, and Thirkeld. In the same way as the later English Martyrs School and Sixth Form College would name its houses after the English Martyrs, the houses of St Francis Grammar School were named after the following:

=== Percy ===
- Thomas Percy, the 7th Earl of Northumberland who was executed in York in 1572.

=== Swalwell ===
- John Swalwell, who can be found on the list of abbots of Monkwearmouth-Jarrow Abbey as Master of Wearmouth in 1526 and Master of Jarrow in 1531.

=== Errington ===
- Roman Catholic churchman, George Errington (martyr), executed at York in 1596.

=== Thirkeld ===
- Roman Catholic priest, Richard Thirkeld, also executed at York in 1583.

== Sites ==
=== Woodlands ===
- Wooler Road, the main site.

=== Normanhurst ===
- Grange Road. Now a pub known as 'The White House'.

== Notable alumni ==
- John Darwin.
- Jez Lowe.

== Reunion Groups ==
- Over 150 members plus photos: http://www.schoolfriends.com.au/School.page/St_Francis_Xavier/10822/Details
- Over 100 members: http://www.friendsreunited.com/School.page/St_Francis_Grammar_School/411118/Details
