= John Darwin disappearance case =

2002–2008 faked death of a British man

John Darwin
- Born: 1950 or 1951 (age 75–76); Prudhoe, Northumberland, England
- Occupations: Teacher; prison officer
- Spouse: Anne Stephenson (m. 1973; div. 2012)
- Status: Released
- Criminal charge: Fraud

The John Darwin disappearance case involved British former teacher and prison officer John Darwin who faked his death to collect life insurance.

Darwin turned up alive in December 2007, five and a half years after he was believed to have died in a canoeing accident. Darwin was arrested and charged with fraud. His wife, Anne, was also arrested and charged for helping Darwin to collect his life insurance of £250,000 (equivalent to about £460,000 in 2025). The fraudulent claim had allowed the couple to pay off their £130,000 (equivalent to about £240,000 in 2025) mortgage. In December 2007, after it was revealed the couple had been photographed together in Panama a year earlier, Anne confessed to knowing Darwin was alive and revealed that he had been secretly living in their house and the house next door, which allowed him to receive the insurance money for his own use. On 23 July 2008, John and Anne Darwin were each sentenced to more than six years in prison.

== Background ==
John Darwin was born in 1950 or 1951. He attended St Francis Xavier's Grammar School, Hartlepool and De La Salle College, Salford, where he studied biology and chemistry.

On 22 December 1973, Darwin married Anne Stephenson in Blackhall. Darwin then taught science and mathematics at Derwentside for 18 years before leaving to join Barclays Bank. He later became a prison officer at HM Prison Holme House.

Darwin and his wife, a doctor's receptionist, also ran a business renting bedsits in County Durham with 12 houses. They ran into debt after purchasing two houses in Seaton Carew in December 2000. The debts caused Darwin to talk about faking his own death to claim the insurance by early 2002.

== Disappearance ==
Darwin was seen paddling out to sea in his kayak on 21 March 2002, at Seaton Carew. Later the same day, he was reported as "missing" after failing to report to work. A large-scale sea search took place, during which 62 square miles (160 km^{2}) of coastline were searched. There was no sign of Darwin, though the following day a double-ended paddle and the wreckage of Darwin's kayak were found. The North Sea was unusually calm and rescuers were puzzled that Darwin could have got into trouble in such conditions.

== Missing years ==
During the years that Darwin was presumed dead, he lived for some time in a bedsit next door to the family home; he then secretly moved back in with his wife Anne in February 2003. Meanwhile, a death certificate was issued stating that Darwin had died on 21 March 2002. This allowed his wife to claim his life insurance; it is alleged that £250,000 was paid out from Unat Direct Insurance Management Limited (part of the AIG insurance group). Some time that year, a tenant of the Darwins' block of bedsit flats recognised Darwin and asked him, "Aren't you supposed to be dead?" to which Darwin replied, "Don't tell anyone about this." The tenant did not tell the police because he "did not want to get involved."

In 2004, the Darwins decided to move abroad, considering Cyprus. John Darwin applied for and obtained a passport using the false name "John Jones", but using his true home address. In November 2004, the couple visited Cyprus to investigate buying property there.

In May 2005, an angler claimed to have met Darwin, who was going under the name "John Williams", at a lake near Penzance, Cornwall. By November, Darwin was back in the UK and flew from Newcastle to Gibraltar, and then travelled to El Puerto de Santa María to view a £45,000, forty-two-foot (13 m) catamaran that he was considering buying from boat dealer Robert Hopkin.

On 9 March 2006, Darwin is reported to have signed a planning objection to a neighbour's building work using a false name. Darwin and his wife began to consider Panama as a possible destination. The couple flew to Panama on 14 July 2006, where they were photographed by a Panamanian property agent, and the resulting photograph was posted on the internet. Newspapers from February 2007 were later found in the boarded-up gap between the Darwins' house and the bedsit where John had hidden. In March 2007, the couple returned to Panama and formed a company called Jaguar Properties in order to buy a two-bedroom apartment in El Dorado for £50,000. The bedsit house next to the family home was sold under the name of the Darwins' son, Mark; the home had been transferred to Mark in 2006. The proceeds from the sale were then transferred to Panama.

The following month, Anne returned to the UK to sell her home while Darwin remained in Panama. In May 2007, the couple purchased a £200,000 tropical estate in the village of Escobal, Colón, Panama, near the Panama Canal, with the intention of building a hotel from where canoeing holidays could be run. In a later interview with Darwin, published in Elizabeth Greenwood's book Playing Dead, he states that the canoe-rental aspect of this purchase was a story entirely fabricated by the media playing on the romanticism of his faked death. He and Anne visited Panama again in July 2007, staying for six weeks.

A police investigation was started in September when a colleague of Anne's became suspicious upon overhearing a phone conversation between the couple. The Darwin family home was sold for £295,000 in October 2007 and Anne subsequently left for Panama. In the third week of November, the couple holidayed in Costa Rica before returning to Panama. On 30 November 2007, Anne bought an airline ticket for her husband to England because "he was missing his sons".

== Return and arrest ==
Following a change in Panama's visa laws, Darwin emailed Anne on 14 June 2007 to notify her that their identities would have to be verified by UK police in order for them to receive now-required Panamanian "investors' visas". Knowing that his "John Jones" alias would not pass this level of scrutiny, Darwin decided to return to the UK under his real name and fake amnesia.

On 1 December 2007, Darwin walked into the West End Central police station in London, claiming to have no memory of the past five years. Anne expressed surprise, joy and elation at the return of her missing husband. The UK police by that time had already suspected that Darwin might not have been dead since Anne, despite portraying herself as a broken-hearted widow, took foreign holidays, planned to sell the family home in Hartlepool to move to Panama and transferred large sums of money abroad. A police financial investigation had already begun three months prior to Darwin's reappearance, following a tip from one of Anne's colleagues connecting her claim on her husband's life insurance and her subsequent emigration to Panama.

The Darwins' cover story unravelled after the Daily Mirror published a photo of the Darwins, taken in Panama in 2006. The photograph had been discovered when a member of the public searched for the words "John", "Anne" and "Panama" in Google Images. The photo had been featured on the website "movetopanama.com" and was brought to the attention of the Daily Mirror and the Cleveland Police. Anne reportedly confirmed that the photograph was of John, saying, "Yes, that's him. My sons will never forgive me." The police then arrested Darwin at his son Anthony's house in Basingstoke.

A police investigation discovered that Darwin had been using a false passport by the name of "John Jones", an identity that had belonged to a baby from Sunderland who had died in 1950. Upon examining the false passport, police found that Darwin had made several trips to Panama in the previous five years.

Darwin's two sons initially expressed elation at the return of their father, but as the story unfolded, they issued a joint statement stating they felt they had been victims of a scam and implying that they wished to have no further contact with their parents.

== Trial ==
Darwin was charged with insurance fraud and making false statements to obtain a passport. Anne Darwin was arrested at Manchester Airport the following day upon returning to the UK, and detained in connection with the allegations of fraud. She appeared in court on 11 December 2007 in Hartlepool to face two charges of fraud: obtaining £25,000 and £137,000 by deception. She remained in custody until 14 December. Darwin appeared at Hartlepool Magistrates' Court on 10 December, where he was also remanded in custody until 14 December.

On 14 December 2007, Anne and John Darwin appeared separately before Hartlepool Magistrates' Court and they both were remanded in custody to appear again on 11 January 2008.

On 9 January 2008, John and Anne Darwin returned to Hartlepool Magistrates' Court to face further charges of deception. John faced an additional charge of obtaining £137,000 by deception (the same charge his wife was already facing) in addition to the existing life insurance charge against both of them for £25,000 and John's separate charge of obtaining a passport by deception. They were then both charged together for obtaining more money from a teachers' pension scheme (two separate amounts of £25,186 and £58,845), as well as for obtaining money from the Department for Work and Pensions (two separate amounts of £2,000 and £2,273). They were remanded in custody once more to appear in court again on 18 January 2008.

On 18 January 2008, they each appeared separately at Hartlepool Magistrates' Court by video-link and were remanded in custody until 15 February 2008, when they faced committal to Crown Court.

On 13 March 2008, John Darwin admitted seven charges of obtaining cash by deception and a passport offence at Leeds Crown Court. He denied nine charges of using criminal property; these charges were ordered to lie on file. Anne Darwin denied six charges of deception and nine of using criminal property.

=== Sentencing ===
On 23 July 2008, John and Anne Darwin were both convicted of fraud. John Darwin faced an additional charge relating to his fake passport and was sentenced to six years and three months in prison. Anne Darwin, who was described by the police as a compulsive liar, was sentenced to six years and six months. Both appealed against their sentences, and on 27 March 2009, both appeals were dismissed by the Court of Appeal. Anne was imprisoned at HM Prison Low Newton.

The Crown Prosecution Service said that all profits from the "callous and calculated" fraud committed by the couple would be confiscated. John Darwin was released on probation in January 2011, and Anne Darwin was released in March 2011.

On 14 February 2012, the CPS announced that the entire £501,641.39 in life insurance and pension payouts received by Anne Darwin had been recovered, partly from the sale of two properties in Panama. Kingsley Hyland, head of the North East CPS Complex Casework Unit, said: "It is important that fraudsters see that not only will we prosecute them wherever possible, but we will also make every effort to retrieve their ill-gotten gains to return them to those they have defrauded."

In April 2014, it was reported that John Darwin had repaid just £121 from the £679,073 that the judge had ordered him to repay. However, this was because all the assets were in Anne Darwin's name. By July 2015, the pair no longer had any assets, having repaid a total of £541,762.39.

== In popular culture ==
The story of John and Anne Darwin was dramatised in the BBC Four programme Canoe Man in 2010. The film starred Bernard Hill and Saskia Reeves as John and Anne Darwin, respectively.

In fiction, it inspired a 2009 novel by Adrian Gere called Return from the Dead, and a 2010 storyline in the ITV soap opera Coronation Street saw the character Joe McIntyre (Reece Dinsdale) attempt the same thing but ultimately drown for real.

It was also used as an inspiration for the return of the supposedly dead Kathy Beale in the BBC soap opera EastEnders.

In October 2021, Wondery released a podcast exploring the disappearance of John Darwin as part of their British Scandal series.

The Thief, His Wife and the Canoe, a dramatisation written by Chris Lang without any cooperation from the Darwin family, and with Eddie Marsan and Monica Dolan in the title roles, was shown on ITV in April 2022.

In September 2023, he was mentioned on the show Saving Lives at Sea that airs on BBC iPlayer as they talked with members of the Hartlepool lifeboat station.

The 2026 BBC sitcom Can You Keep a Secret? is loosely based on the case.

== See also ==
- List of solved missing person cases (2000s)
