= Henry Weedall =

British Roman Catholic preacher, educator and churchman

The Right Reverend Monsignor Henry Weedall
- Born: 6 September 1788
- Died: 7 November 1859 (aged 71)
- Education: St Mary's College, Oscott
- Religion: Roman Catholic
- Ordained: 6 April 1814
- Offices held: President of Oscott College (1824–1840, 1853–1859)

Henry Weedall (6 September 1788 - 7 November 1859) was a British nineteenth century Roman Catholic preacher, educator and churchman.

== Biography ==
He was born in London the son of a doctor. Both his parents died during his early childhood. He was educated at Sedgley Park (1794–1804), and at St. Mary's College, Oscott, a seminary near Birmingham, from 1804 to 1814. He was ordained a priest at Wolverhampton on 6 April 1814. He had been acting as a junior master at Oscott, and after his ordination he continued to teach classics, assisting also in the care of the Oscott mission.

In the beginning of 1816 he became prefect of studies; and when Thomas Walsh (afterwards bishop of the district) became president (August, 1818), Weedall undertook the vice-presidency, taught Divinity, and had the spiritual care of lay-students and the familia. From the summer of 1821 he had been in effect the president of Oscott, and when Walsh left Oscott, on succeeding to the vicariate (April, 1826), Weedall was made president in name also.

Walsh named him his vicar-general (14 June 1828), and obtained for him the degree of Doctor of Divinity (27 January 1829). He had been elected a member of the Old Chapter, 8 May 1827. Under his rule Oscott made noteworthy progress, and the present college edifice, two miles from the old, was erected (1826–38). On the division of the vicariates in 1840, Weedall was appointed Vicar Apostolic of the Northern District, with the titular See of Abydos; Wiseman being at the same time made coadjutor bishop to Walsh and president of Oscott.

Weedall went to Rome and obtained leave to decline the vicariate. He was then head of the preparatory school at Old Oscott, 1841–43, followed by becoming rector at Leamington, 1843–8, until William Bernard Ullathorne came to the Central District (August, 1848). Weedall was named as vicar-general, dean of the cathedral church, and temporal administrator of the district and the two colleges. In 1852, he became the first provost of the newly erected Birmingham Chapter. On 2 July 1853, he returned as president to Oscott in its hour of difficulty, sent "to renew that peculiar spirit of ecclesiastical piety and discipline within its walls with which his character imbued it from the first", and, in spite of almost continuous ill health, he was entirely successful.

He died at Oscott on 7 November 1859, aged 71, and was interred underneath the college's chapel. In 1854 he had been made a domestic prelate to Pius IX. Weedall had considerable reputation as a preacher, and was an occasional contributor to the reviews. The Weedall Chantry perpetuates his memory at Oscott.

A biography of him titled The life of the right Reverend Monsignor Weedall, D.D. and written by F. C Husenbeth was published in 1860.
