= Oscott (ward) =

Coordinates: 52.5474°N 1.8517°W

- Ward
- Location within the West Midlands
- Population: 24,615 (2011 Ward)
  - Density: 33.4 per ha
- OS grid reference: SP100944
- Metropolitan borough: Birmingham
- Metropolitan county: West Midlands
- Region: West Midlands
- Country: England
- Sovereign state: United Kingdom
- Post town: BIRMINGHAM
- Postcode district: B44
- Dialling code: 0121
- Police: West Midlands
- Fire: West Midlands
- Ambulance: West Midlands
- UK Parliament: Birmingham Perry Barr

Oscott is a ward in the northwest of Birmingham, England, within the formal district of Perry Barr.

The Ward is centred on the area known as Old Oscott, originally just "Oscott", and should not be confused with nearby New Oscott. It includes the former Booths Farm sand quarry, Aldridge Road Recreation Ground, and Kingstanding Circle. The ward borders the Metropolitan Borough of Walsall and areas such as Perry Beeches and Queslett. Parts fall within Great Barr.

The nearest library serving the ward is Kingstanding Library.

== History ==
The area is mainly a housing estate built in the 1930s and 1940s. Before that time, it was mainly rural farmland.

== Population ==
The 2001 Population Census recorded that there were 24,073 people living in the ward. 9.4% (2,273) of the ward's population consists of ethnic minorities which is low compared to the average percentage of 29.6% for Birmingham.

== Local politics ==
After the most recent local council elections in 2026, the ward of Oscott is represented on Birmingham City Council by Graham Green and Martin McAuley, both of Reform UK.

The ward has adopted a Ward Support Officer.

== Oscott Ward Local Action Plan ==
The Oscott Ward Local Action Plan was a locally organised plan to improve the quality of living within the ward during 2004 and 2005. Through funding from the Neighbourhood Renewal Fund, problems raised by local residents such as vandalism, anti-social behaviour and the cleanliness of the area were tackled.
