= Hugh Lindsay (bishop) =

English Roman Catholic bishop (1927–2009)

- Bishop of Hexham and Newcastle
- In office: 1974-1992

Orders
- Ordination: 11 December 1969

Personal details
- Born: 20 June 1927 Newcastle upon Tyne
- Died: 19 January 2009 (aged 81) Boarbank Hall
- Education: St Cuthbert's Grammar School
- Alma mater: Ushaw College

Hugh Lindsay (20 June 1927 – 19 January 2009) was a bishop of the Roman Catholic Church in England and Wales.

== Biography ==
Lindsay was born in Newcastle upon Tyne on 20 June 1927. He was one of five children. He was educated at St Cuthbert's Grammar School, Newcastle upon Tyne, and Ushaw College, Durham. He was evacuated to Cockermouth during World War II. He later carried out his military service with the RAF in India.

After priestly ordination in 1953, he worked in a variety of roles in the Diocese of Hexham and Newcastle, most notably as secretary at Bishop's House. In 1969 Pope Paul VI appointed him Auxiliary Bishop of Hexham and Newcastle and titular Bishop of Cuncacestre.

Lindsay was consecrated bishop at St. Mary's Cathedral, Newcastle upon Tyne, on 11 December 1969. He continued to assist the then Bishop of Hexham and Newcastle, Bishop James Cunningham, until the latter resigned the diocese in 1974. Lindsay was subsequently appointed to succeed Bishop Cunningham on 12 December 1974, when he took possession of the Diocese as Ordinary and bishop in his own right.

On 10 June 1977, Pope Paul VI appointed Owen Swindlehurst, another priest of the diocese, to assist Lindsay as Auxiliary Bishop and titular Bishop of Cuncacestre. Lindsay resigned the See on grounds of ill health in early 1992.

Lindsay assisted the Archbishop of Liverpool, Derek Worlock, at the consecration of his successor, Bishop Ambrose Griffiths, on 20 March 1992. Until his death, Lindsay took up residence in the Diocese of Lancaster and continued to be an active member of the Catholic Bishops' Conference of England and Wales.

== Death ==
Lindsay died suddenly on 19 January 2009, aged 81 at Boarbank Hall, his retirement home in Grange over Sands, Cumbria.

== See also ==
Catholic Church titles
Preceded by James Cunningham	Bishop of Hexham and Newcastle; 1974–1992	Succeeded by Ambrose Griffiths
