= Robert Byrne (bishop) =

English prelate of the Catholic Church (born 1956)

The Right Reverend Robert Byrne C.O.
- Bishop Emeritus of Hexham and Newcastle
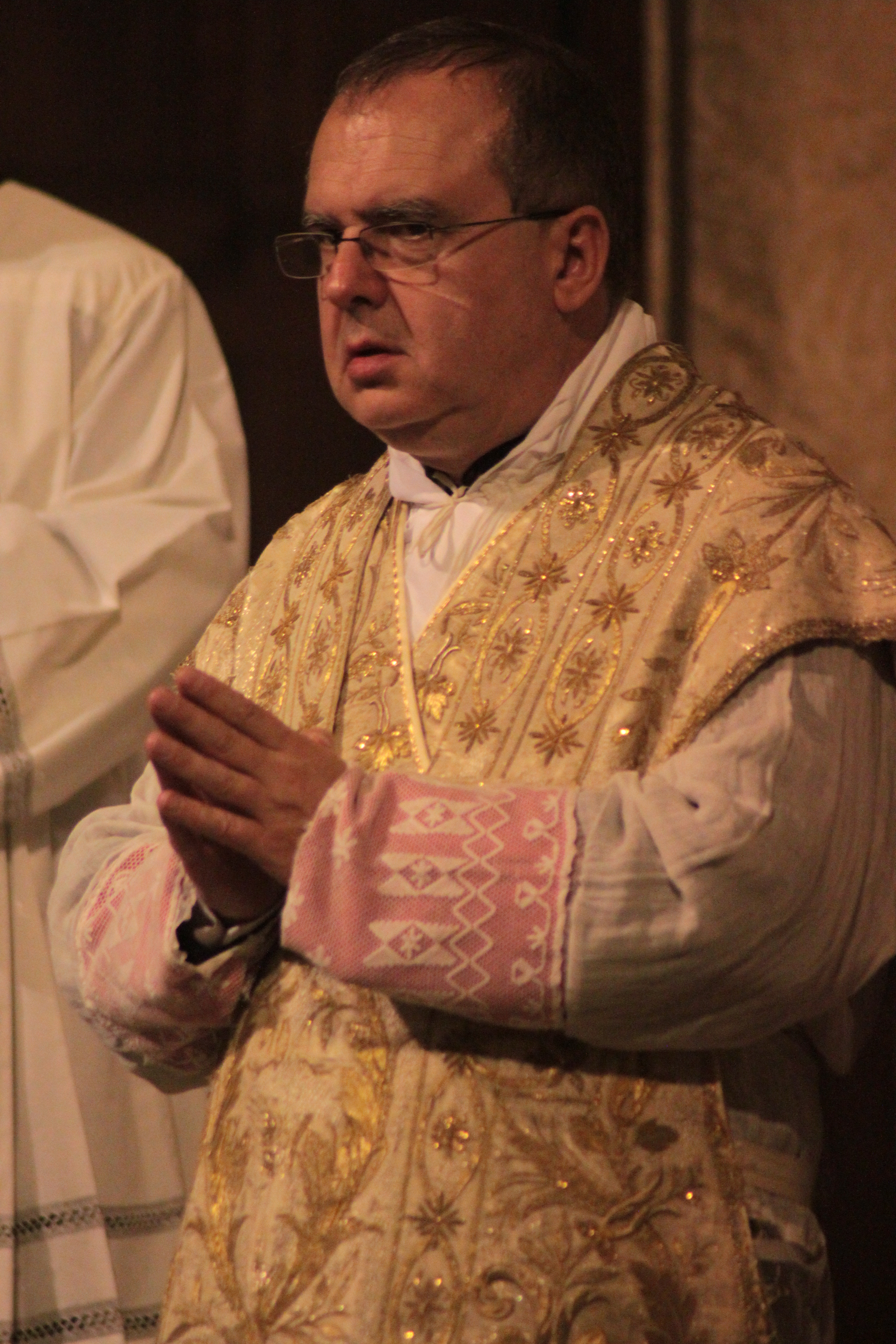
- Church: Catholic Church
- Province: Liverpool
- Diocese: Hexham and Newcastle
- Appointed: 4 February 2019
- Installed: 25 March 2019
- Term ended: 12 December 2022
- Predecessor: Séamus Cunningham
- Successor: Stephen Wright
- Previous posts: Titular bishop of Cuncacestre (2014–2019); Auxiliary bishop in Birmingham (2014–2019)

Orders
- Ordination: 5 January 1985 by Maurice Couve de Murville
- Consecration: 13 May 2014 by Bernard Longley

Personal details
- Born: 22 September 1956 (age 70) Manchester, England
- Education: King's College, London; Pontifical University of Saint Thomas Aquinas
- Motto: Soli Deo; (To God Alone)
- Coat of arms

Robert Byrne, C.O. (born 22 September 1956) is a prelate of the Catholic Church in England. He was the 14th Bishop of Hexham and Newcastle from 2019 to 2022. He previously served as titular bishop of Cuncacestre and as an auxiliary bishop of the Archdiocese of Birmingham. He is the first Oratorian to be appointed a bishop in England since 1874.

== Biography ==
=== Early life ===
Robert Byrne was born on 22 September 1956 in Manchester, England. He was educated at St Bede's College, Manchester, a private Catholic school. He studied at King's College, London and at the Pontifical University of Saint Thomas Aquinas in Rome.

=== Priesthood and Religious Life ===
Byrne entered the Birmingham Oratory in 1980. On 5 January 1985, he was ordained to the priesthood by Maurice Couve de Murville, the then Archbishop of Birmingham. In 1990, he moved to Oxford where he founded the Oxford Oratory. From 1990 to 1999, he was Parish Priest of the Parish of St Aloysius, Oxford. From 1993 to 2011, he served as the elected Provost of Oxford Oratory.

=== Auxiliary Bishop of Birmingham ===
In March 2014, Pope Francis appointed him an auxiliary bishop of Archdiocese of Birmingham. As such, he became the first Oratorian to be appointed a bishop in England since 1874 when Edward Bagshawe was appointed Bishop of Nottingham. On 13 May 2014, he was consecrated to the episcopate as the Titular Bishop of Cuncacestre. The principal consecrator was Bernard Longley, the Archbishop of Birmingham, and the co-consecrators were Michael C. Barber SJ, the Bishop of Oakland, and Philip Pargeter, his predecessor as Auxiliary Bishop of Birmingham. The pastoral area within the Archdiocese of Birmingham assigned to his particular care covered six deaneries: Birmingham Cathedral, Birmingham North, Birmingham South, Birmingham East, Kidderminster, and Worcester.

=== Bishop of Hexham and Newcastle ===
On 4 February 2019, Pope Francis appointed Byrne Bishop of Hexham and Newcastle, in succession to Séamus Cunningham. He was enthroned as the 14th bishop of the Diocese of Hexham and Newcastle during a Mass at St Mary's Cathedral, Newcastle on 25 March 2019.

=== Resignation and controversy ===
On 12 December 2022, Pope Francis accepted his resignation from his see, nine years before the retirement age of 75 mandated by Catholic canon law. In a statement, the bishop said that the duties of his office had "become too great a burden to bear". In the same month, Byrne had been reported to the police "after an allegation of abuse was made against him by a priest from another diocese to his bishop".

On 22 January 2023, it was reported that the Holy See was investigating rumours of a sex party at St Mary's Cathedral. As part of the investigation into Byrne's resignation, the Church was looking into claims one of his priests invited worshippers to a party in his quarters attached to the cathedral during lockdown. The priest, Michael McCoy, dean of the cathedral, killed himself four days after finding out he was being investigated by police for child sexual abuse. In a letter seen by The Sunday Times Malcolm McMahon, Archbishop of Liverpool, who was leading the investigation into the circumstances surrounding Byrne's resignation, said he has been asked by the pope's advisers to prepare "an in-depth report into the events leading up to Bishop Byrne's resignation".

In May 2023, a summary of the report was published which included a number of findings:

- "lewd parties" did not take place at St Mary's Cathedral but gatherings for volunteers with wine and takeaways did take place, in contravention of Covid regulations
- Bishop's House in West Denton was sold and a replacement was bought in Gosforth, a middle class area: this was deemed an "error of judgement" and that "Bishop Byrne could have relocated to a property that served his and diocesan needs in a less conspicuous area at a lower cost"
- Byrne had promoted Canon Michael McCoy to dean of Newcastle cathedral, despite multiple safeguarding issues against the priest: McCoy would go on to kill himself after police spoke with him in relation to historic sexual abuse allegations
- Byrne continued to associate with Timothy Gardner OP, a convicted paedophile: including their being seen together in public, inviting Gardner multiple times to the bishop's residence, and attempting to get him employment in the diocese's archives and with an overseas charity. In 2025, Gardner was further convicted of five new sex offences.

== See also ==
- Catholic Church in England

Catholic Church titles
| Preceded by Séamus Cunningham | Bishop of Hexham and Newcastle; 2019 – 2022 | Succeeded by Stephen Wright |
