= Ambrose Griffiths =

British abbot and bishop (1928–2011)

The Right Reverend Ambrose Griffiths OSB
- Bishop of Hexham and Newcastle
- Province: Liverpool
- Diocese: Hexham and Newcastle
- Installed: 1992
- Term ended: 2004
- Predecessor: Hugh Lindsay
- Successor: Kevin John Dunn
- Other posts: Bishop Emeritus of Hexham and Newcastle (2004–2011)
- Previous post: Abbot of Saint Lawrence's Abbey, Ampleforth 1976–1984

Orders
- Ordination: 21 July 1957 (priest)
- Consecration: 20 March 1992

Personal details
- Born: Michael Griffiths; 4 December 1928 Twickenham, England
- Died: 14 June 2011 (aged 82)
- Denomination: Roman Catholic

Dom Ambrose Griffiths OSB KC*HS (4 December 1928 – 14 June 2011) was a Benedictine abbot before becoming a Roman Catholic bishop in the Catholic Church in England and Wales.

== Biography ==
Born Michael Griffiths in Twickenham, Middlesex, and educated at Ampleforth College, near York, and at Balliol College, Oxford, he entered the monastery at Ampleforth, taking the religious name of Ambrose, and was ordained to the priesthood on 21 July 1957; he then taught science at Ampleforth until 1972.

In 1976, following the appointment of Abbot Basil Hume as Archbishop of Westminster, Dom Ambrose was elected Abbot of Ampleforth, a post he held until 1984 when he became Parish Priest of Leyland, Preston, Lancashire (Archdiocese of Liverpool). He then he received the title of Abbot of Westminster.

In 1991 Bishop Hugh Lindsay announced his intention to resign the See of Hexham and Newcastle on the grounds of ill health. His resignation was accepted by Pope John Paul II, who in turn appointed Abbot Ambrose Griffiths as eleventh Bishop of Hexham and Newcastle. He received episcopal consecration in St. Mary's Cathedral, Newcastle upon Tyne, on 20 March 1992, the feast of Saint Cuthbert, co-patron of the diocese. The principal consecrator was Archbishop Derek Worlock of Liverpool. Worlock Worlock was assisted by retiring Bishop, Bishop Hugh Lindsay and Bishop Owen Swindlehurst, Auxiliary Bishop of Hexham and Newcastle and titular Bishop of Cuncacestre.

Auxiliary Bishop Swindlehurst died on 28 August 1995 and was not replaced, leaving Bishop Griffiths to administer the diocese without the assistance of any auxiliary. He implemented a number of changes to the structure of the diocese in order to ease transition to a new model of administration, and these measures included appointing new vicars general to assist the bishop. Throughout his tenure, Bishop Griffiths worked closely with young people, establishing a Youth Mission Team in the diocese and representing young Catholics in the Catholic Bishops' Conference of England and Wales.

He served as leader of the Diocese of Hexham and Newcastle for twelve years. When he reached the age limit for bishops of 75 years, prescribed in the Code of Canon Law for the Latin Rite branch of the Catholic Church, he submitted his resignation to John Paul II. His resignation was accepted and he retired on 25 May 2004, the memorial of Saint Bede, the Venerable. On the same day, he presided at the consecration of Kevin Dunn, who succeeded him. After retiring, he moved to St Mary's parish in Leyland, Preston, Lancashire and continued in his work as a member of the Catholic Bishops' Conference of England and Wales.

Following a serious illness, due to acute leukaemia, he died, aged, 82, at Saint Mary's, during the afternoon of 14 June 2011. He is buried at Ampleforth Abbey.

Catholic Church titles
Preceded by Basil Hume	Abbot of Ampleforth; 1976–1984	Succeeded by Patrick Barry
Preceded by Hugh Lindsay	Bishop of Hexham and Newcastle; 1992–2004	Succeeded by Kevin Dunn
