= Kevin Dunn (bishop) =

Roman Catholic bishop

Kevin John Dunn
- Bishop of Hexham and Newcastle
- Church: Catholic Church
- Diocese: Diocese of Hexham and Newcastle
- In office: 26 March 2004 – 1 March 2008
- Predecessor: Ambrose Griffiths
- Successor: Séamus Cunningham

Orders
- Ordination: 17 January 1976
- Consecration: 25 May 2004 by Ambrose Griffiths

Personal details
- Born: 9 July 1950 Newcastle-under-Lyme, Staffordshire, United Kingdom
- Died: 1 March 2008 (aged 57) Newcastle upon Tyne, Tyne and Wear, United Kingdom

Kevin John Dunn (9 July 1950 – 1 March 2008) was the twelfth Roman Catholic Bishop of Hexham and Newcastle.

== Early life ==
Kevin John Dunn was born in Newcastle-under-Lyme, Staffordshire on 9 July 1950 and educated at St Mary's Primary School and St Patrick's Secondary School (both Newcastle-under-Lyme)./ He studied at Christleton Hall in Chester, and studied A Levels at Cotton College, North Staffordshire. He studied for the priesthood at Oscott College, Birmingham, and was ordained at Our Lady and St Werbergh's Church, Clayton, Newcastle-under-Lyme on 17 January 1976.

== Priest ==
After ordination Dunn served in St Patrick's, Walsall, and was chaplain to Stuart Bathurst Catholic High School. Living in Aston, Birmingham he was chaplain to the Anglo-Caribbean community in the Archdiocese of Birmingham from 1980 to 1987. For two years he was parish priest at Our Lady of the Angels and St Peter in Chains, Stoke-on-Trent and served as Chaplain to the Royal Infirmary and Chaplain to Staffordshire University.

He underwent further studies at the Pontifical University of St. Thomas Aquinas (Angelicum) in Rome and was awarded a Doctorate in Canon Law in 1991. Upon his return to England in 1991, he worked as a Parish Priest at St Austin's, Stafford and also lectured in Canon Law at Oscott College. During this time he became the Episcopal Vicar for Religious in the Archdiocese of Birmingham. In 2001 he was also appointed full-time Episcopal Vicar for the areas of Wolverhampton, Walsall, the Black Country and Worcestershire. In 2002 he became a Canon of the Metropolitan Chapter of Saint Chad, and a member of the Episcopal Council in the Archdiocese of Birmingham.

== Bishop ==
He was appointed Bishop of Hexham and Newcastle by Pope John Paul II, and was consecrated on 25 May 2004 at St Mary's Cathedral, Newcastle upon Tyne.

In 2006 he led a group on a visit to Rome and met Pope Benedict XVI.

Among his achievements, he opened the Alan Shearer Centre for people with disabilities, created a house in Penshaw for potential seminary candidates and helped to raise money to establish the Bede Chair of Catholic Theology at Durham University.

== Death ==
Dunn was admitted to the Freeman Hospital, Newcastle, in early February 2008, and died there on 1 March 2008, aged 57, from pneumonia. Canon Seamus Cunningham, who succeeded Dunn as Bishop of Hexham and Newcastle, administered the Prayers for the Dying and Prayers for the Dead.

Durham University holds an annual 'Bishop Dunn Memorial Lecture' in his memory.

== Sources ==
- The Telegraph, 26 March 2008

Catholic Church titles
Preceded by Ambrose Griffiths	Bishop of Hexham and Newcastle; 2004–2008	Succeeded by Séamus Cunningham
