= St Mary's Cathedral, Newcastle upon Tyne =

Coordinates: 54°58′08″N 1°37′12″W

St Mary's Cathedral
- Cathedral Church of St Mary, Newcastle upon Tyne
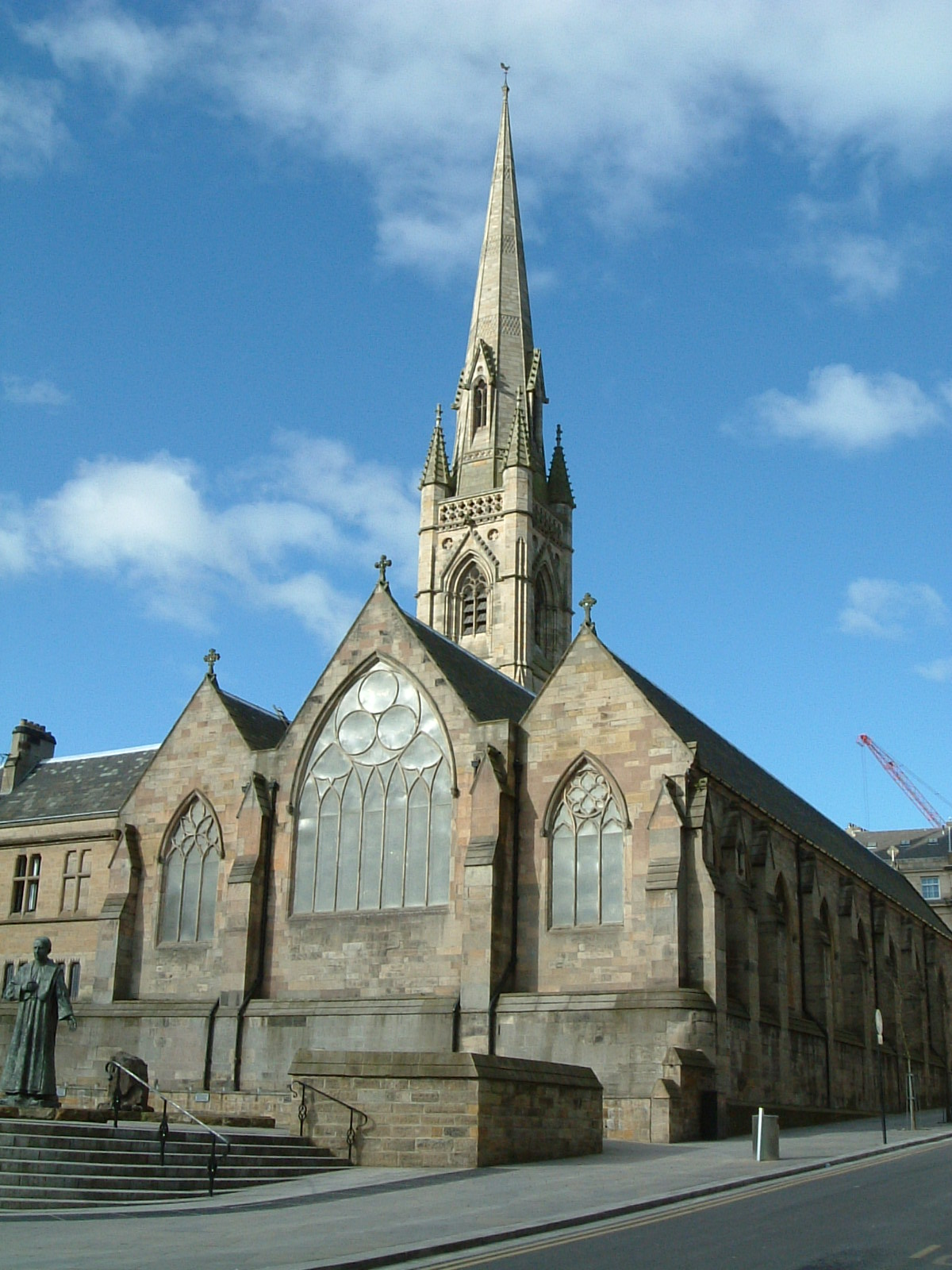
- The Cathedral with Cardinal Hume statue in foreground (March 2006)

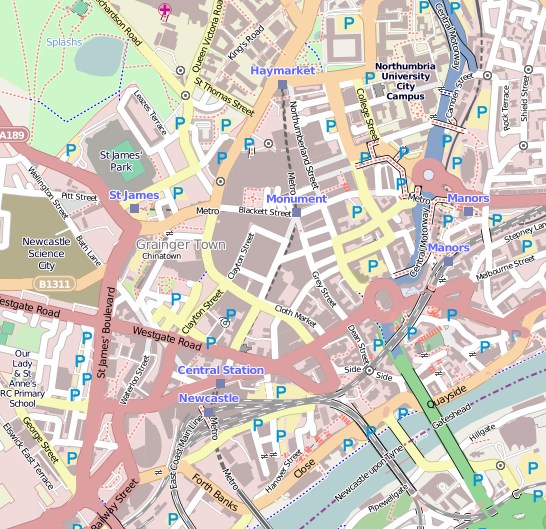
- Shown within Newcastle
- OS grid reference: NZ 24476 63908
- Location: Newcastle upon Tyne, Tyne and Wear
- Country: England
- Denomination: Roman Catholic
- Website: www.stmaryscathedral.org.uk

History
- Status: Cathedral
- Consecrated: 1844

Architecture
- Functional status: Active
- Architect: Augustus Welby Northmore Pugin
- Architectural type: Church
- Style: Gothic Revival
- Years built: 1842–1844
- Completed: 21 August 1844

Administration
- Province: Liverpool
- Diocese: Hexham and Newcastle

Clergy
- Bishop: Stephen Wright
- Dean: Canon Simon Lerche

The Cathedral Church of St Mary is a Catholic cathedral in Newcastle upon Tyne, Tyne and Wear, England. It is the mother church of the Diocese of Hexham and Newcastle and seat of the Bishop of Hexham and Newcastle. The cathedral, situated on Clayton Street, was designed by Augustus Welby Pugin and built between 1842 and 1844. The cathedral is a grade I listed building and a fine example of the Gothic Revival style of architecture championed by Pugin.

There is a monument dedicated to Cardinal Basil Hume in the Monument Garden outside of the cathedral, which was opened by Queen Elizabeth II in 2002. St Mary's Cathedral is the sixth tallest structure in the city.

== History ==
St. Mary's Church in Newcastle opened in August 1844, paid for largely through halfpenny subscriptions from the community of poor immigrants on Tyneside. The priest at the mission at Newcastle upon Tyne was William Riddell. The stained glass in the Great East Window, Lady Chapel and Blessed Sacrament Chapel, were done by William Wailes in 1843 to designs provided by Pugin.

By decree of Pope Pius IX on 29 September 1850, the Catholic hierarchy was restored on a regular pattern to England and Wales. Much of what had been known as the Vicariate Apostolic of the Northern District became the new See of Hexham. Bishop William Hogarth was appointed to be the first bishop of the new diocese, and as such, required a church in which to place his seat or cathedra. St Mary's was chosen for this purpose and thus it gained the status of a cathedral church in 1850, becoming the first cathedral in Newcastle, as the Anglican St. Nicholas' Cathedral didn't become a cathedral until 1882.

On 21 August 1860, the cathedral was dedicated to Our Lady of the Assumption. The name of the see was changed in 1861 to Diocese of Hexham and Newcastle. Since then, eleven further bishops have been installed in St Mary's as Bishop of Hexham and Newcastle.

With a bequest from the estate of Elizabeth Dunn, in 1872 a tower and steeple designed by Dunn & Hansom were added.

== Present ==
The seat of the Bishop of Hexham and Newcastle was vacant after the death of the Right Reverend Kevin John Dunn in March 2008. He served in the post for almost four years, having been consecrated a Bishop and installed on the feast of St Bede the Venerable, 25 May 2004. Seamus Cunningham received his episcopal consecration on 20 March 2009 (feast of St. Cuthbert, the diocese's patron), at St. Mary's Cathedral. He is the thirteenth bishop of the Diocese of Hexham and Newcastle.

On 21 April 2006 the incumbent Dean, the Reverend Michael Campion, officially left his appointment at the cathedral. He is succeeded by the Reverend Peter Leighton, formerly the Catholic Chaplain to the University of Durham. Under the careful guidance of the Reverend Peter Leighton, the cathedral has undergone a thorough period of renovation restoring much of the beauty of the original design. Phase one of the work was completed in September 2010 and phase two of the work, which included the installation of a new three-manual Kenneth Tickell organ of 46 stops, was completed in February 2013.

On 4 February, Pope Francis announced that Bishop Robert Byrne was to be the next Bishop of Hexham and Newcastle after the resignation of Bishop Seamus Cunningham. Robert Byrne previously served as an auxiliary bishop of the Archdiocese of Birmingham, he is also a member of the Oratory the St. Philip Neri at Birmingham Oratory.

=== Controversy ===
In 2019, Canon Michael McCoy was appointed dean by Bishop Robert Byrne in succession to Father Dermott Donnelly (brother of TV presenter Declan Donnelly). This was despite multiple issues on his record, including being "subject of safeguarding plans regarding boundaries relevant to working with older teenagers". On 10 April 2021, McCoy was found dead: following an inquest, it was found that he had killed himself after being informed of historical sexual abuse allegations against him.

On 22 January 2023, it was reported that the Vatican was investigating rumours of a sex party at St Mary's Cathedral. In May 2023, it was concluded that "Allegations that lewd parties took place at St Mary’s Cathedral during the pandemic are simply untrue." However, there were gatherings for volunteers with wine and takeaways, in contravention to Covid regulations in place at that time.

== Gallery ==
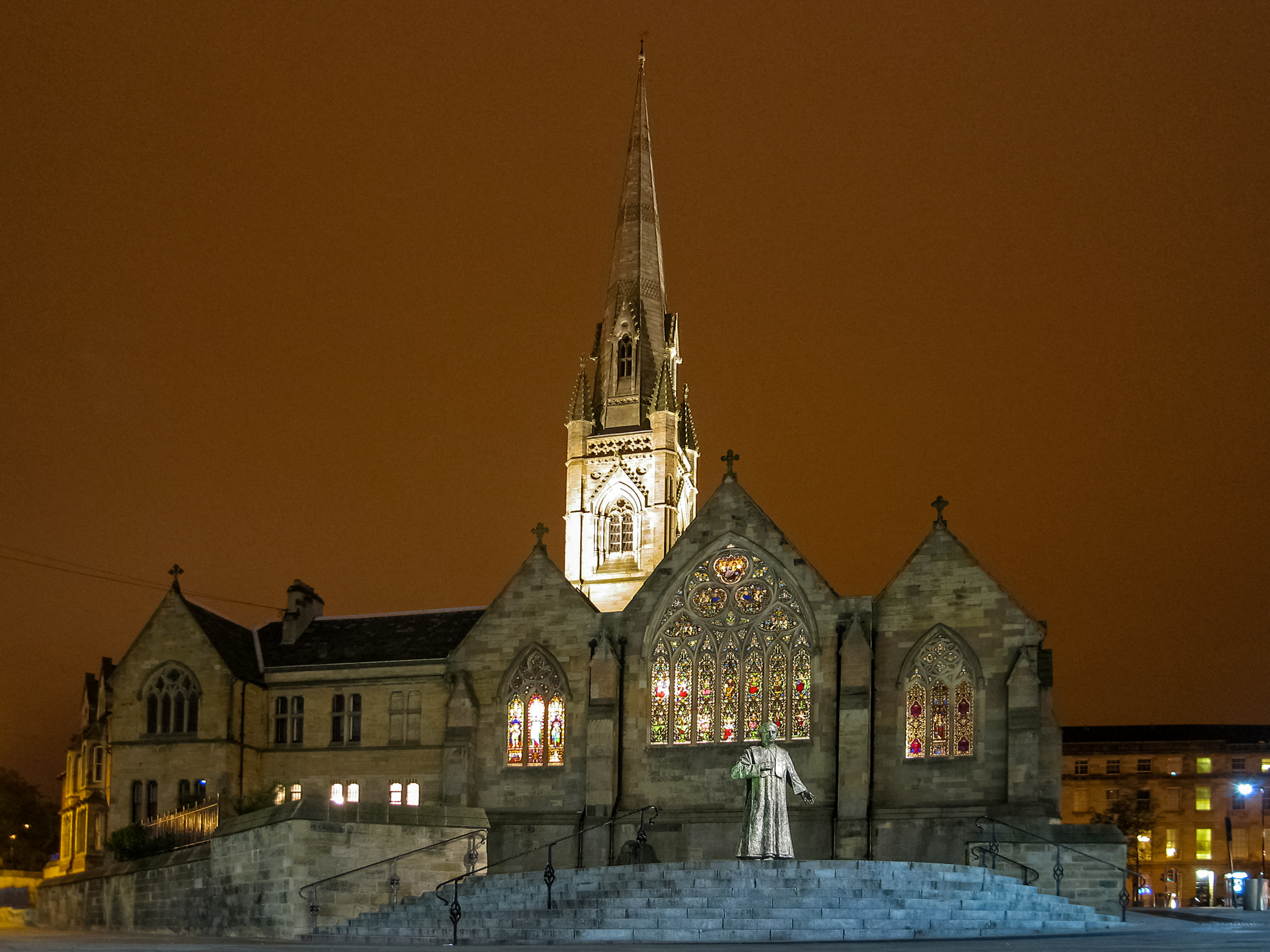
As seen from Neville Street

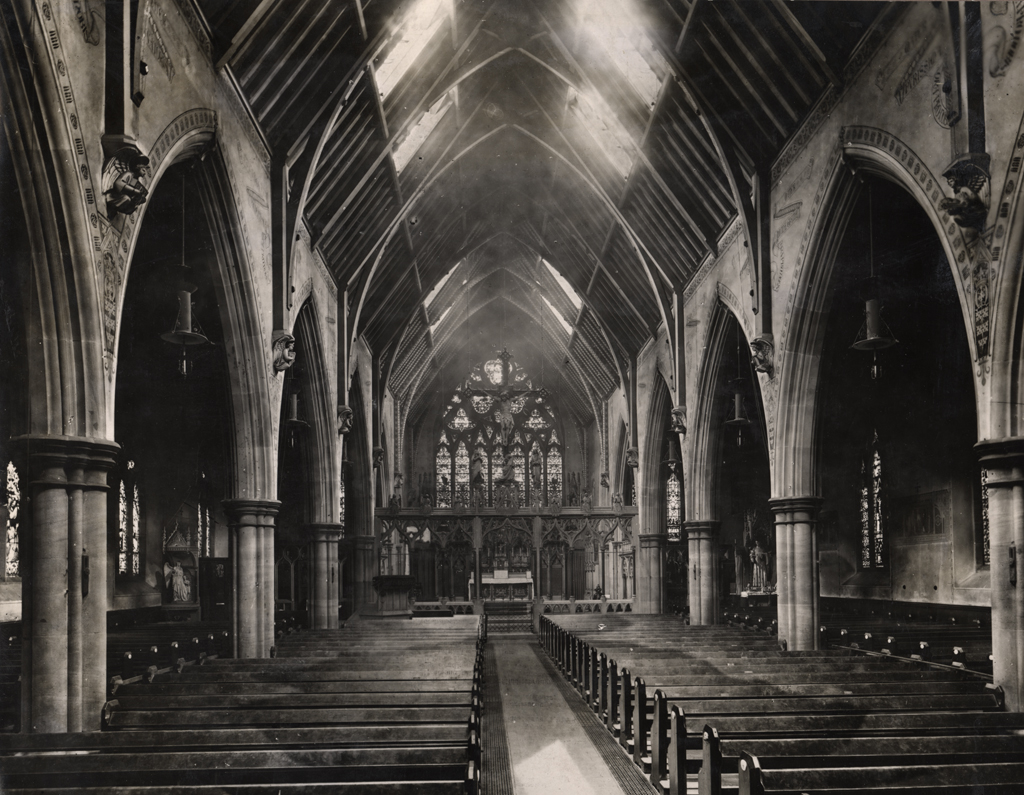
Nave circa 1900

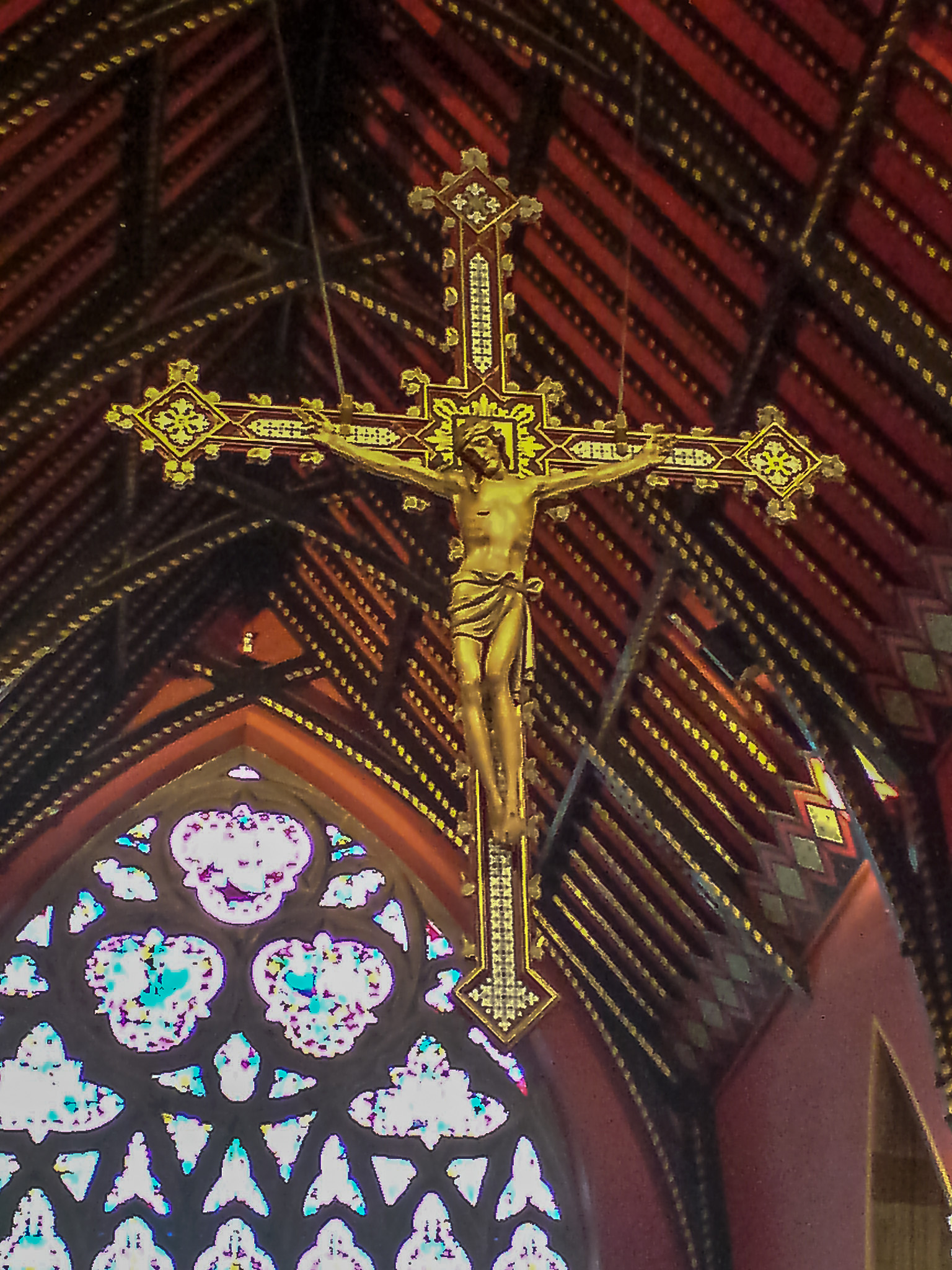
Crucifix

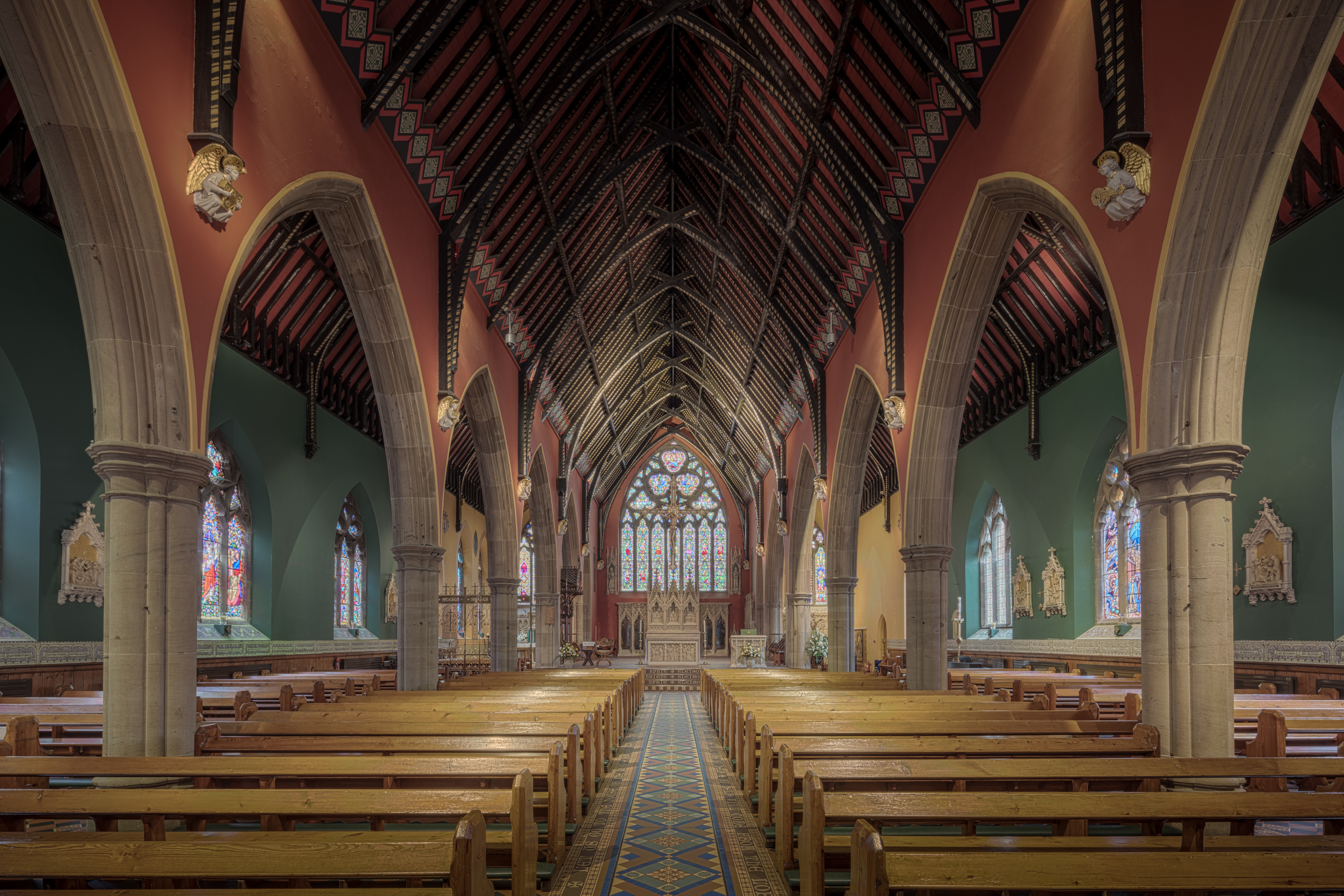
Nave in 2017

== See also ==
- Bishop Ambrose Griffiths – Eleventh Bishop of Hexham and Newcastle
- Bishop Hugh Lindsay – Tenth Bishop of Hexham and Newcastle
- Basil Cardinal Hume – Archbishop of Westminster 1976–1999
- Robert Byrne – current bishop of the Diocese of Hexham and Newcastle
