= Séamus Cunningham =

Irish-born prelate (born 1942)

The Right Reverend Séamus Cunningham
- Bishop Emeritus of Hexham and Newcastle
- Province: Liverpool
- Diocese: Hexham and Newcastle
- Appointed: 9 January 2009
- Installed: 20 March 2009
- Term ended: 4 February 2019
- Predecessor: Kevin John Dunn
- Successor: Robert Byrne

Orders
- Ordination: 12 June 1966
- Consecration: 20 March 2009 by Patrick Altham Kelly

Personal details
- Born: 7 July 1942 (age 83) Castlebar, County Mayo, Ireland
- Denomination: Roman Catholic

Séamus Cunningham (born 7 July 1942) is an Irish-born prelate of the Roman Catholic Church in England. He was the Bishop of Hexham and Newcastle in the north of England from 2009 to 2019. He retired to the city of Sunderland and helps out as an assistant priest across the Catholic parishes in the city.

== Biography ==
Séamus Cunningham was born in Castlebar, County Mayo. He attended St. Nathy's College in Ballaghaderreen and St. John's College in Waterford. He was ordained to the priesthood for the diocese of Hexham and Newcastle on 12 June 1966 and then undertook pastoral work in north west County Durham and Newcastle upon Tyne until 1972.

Cunningham was a diocesan adviser for Religious Education and Catechetics from 1972 to 1978, when he became director of Religious Education. From 1984 to 1987, he served as spiritual director at Ushaw College. In 1987 he was appointed administrator of St. Mary's Cathedral Church and a canon. Following a sabbatical in the United States Cunningham became a pastor in Tynemouth and Cullercoats in 1988. He was named vicar general of Hexham and Newcastle in 2004 and, following Bishop Kevin Dunn's death on 1 March 2008, elected Diocesan Administrator on 2 March.

On 9 January 2009, Cunningham was appointed the thirteenth Bishop of Hexham and Newcastle by Pope Benedict XVI. He received his episcopal consecration on 20 March 2009, the Feast of Saint Cuthbert, the patron of the diocese, at St. Mary's Cathedral. He retired from the position in February 2019.

Catholic Church titles
Preceded by Kevin John Dunn	Bishop of Hexham and Newcastle; 2009 – 2019	Succeeded by Robert Byrne
