= Oscott Psalter =

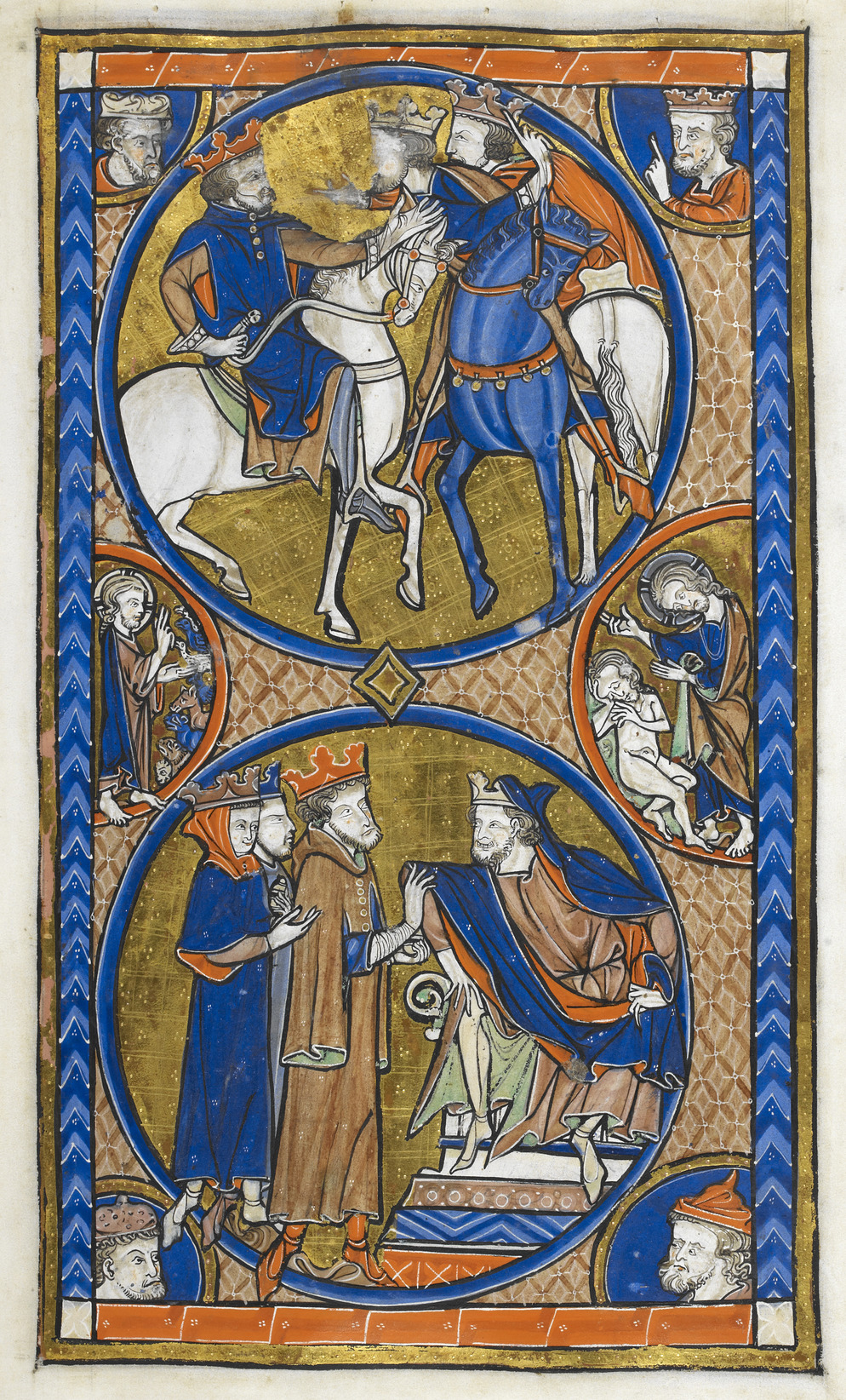
The Journey of the Magi, full-page miniature in the Oscott Psalter

The Oscott Psalter (British Library Add MS 50000) is an illustrated psalter made between 1265 and 1270, possibly in Oxford, and currently in the collections of the British Library in London. It is possible that it was commissioned for Ottobuono de' Fieschi, the future Pope Adrian V. It is named after St Mary's College, Oscott, where it was kept in the 19th century. Its decoration is considered of very high quality for its period.

== History ==
The origins of the Oscott Psalter are unknown. On stylistic grounds, it has been determined that it was made between 1265 and 1270. The colophon contains mention, in medieval French, of a scribe named William, but his role in the production of the manuscript is uncertain. The calendar mentions several saints which were venerated in the West Midlands of England (Saints Modwenna, Mildburh, Oswald of Northumbria and Edith of Polesworth), indicating the patron who ordered the book may have been from there or connected with the region. The manuscript show certain similarities with other manuscripts from roughly the same time and made in Oxford, leading to speculation that the Oscott Psalter may have been made there.

In 1964, a loose leaf belonging to the psalter was identified and also bought by the British Library; it depicts on one side an enthroned church official. It has been suggested by D. H. Turner that this is a portrait of Ottobuono de' Fieschi, who was sent as an envoy of Pope Clement IV to England in May 1265 and who later became Pope Adrian V. The psalter may thus have been commissioned for him.

The manuscript derives its current name from St Mary's College, Oscott. It may have been donated to the college by Charles Blundell of the Weld-Blundell family. Its earlier provenance is uncertain. It was sold by the college to art collector Charles William Dyson Perrins in 1908. In 1958 it was acquired by the British Museum.

== Description ==
The psalter is written on parchment, and bound in a later book binding. It contains 22 full-page miniatures as well as ten large (and over 150 small) historiated initials and other decorative elements. The full-scale miniatures depict scenes from the life of Christ (nine miniatures), ten are portraits of saints, and the remaining three depict the Last Judgment, Christ in Majesty and David.

Stylistically, the miniatures are in an Early Gothic style, part of the so-called "Court School" and considered of very high quality. Turner calls the psalter "the finest surviving illuminated manuscript of its period", and it has also been described as "one of the most perfect English manuscripts of its period".

== Sourced cited ==
- Turner, D. H. (1969). "Two Rediscovered Miniatures of the Oscott Psalter". The British Museum Quarterly. 34 (1/2): 10–19.
- Brown, T. J.; Meredith-Owens, G. M.; Turner, D. H. (1961). "Manuscripts from the Dyson Perrins Collection". The British Museum Quarterly. 23 (2): 27–38.
