= New Oscott =

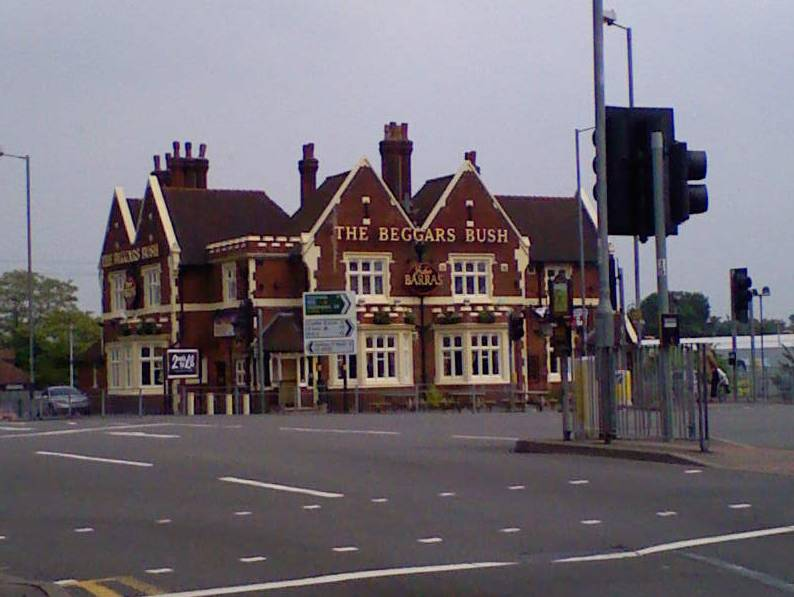
- The Beggars Bush pub in New Oscott
- Interactive map of New Oscott
- Coordinates: 52.544°N 1.857°W
- Country: England
- City: Birmingham

New Oscott is an area of Birmingham, England.

It was named after the Oscott area of Birmingham, when St. Mary's College, the Roman Catholic seminary, moved from that site to the new one. The original then became known as Old Oscott.

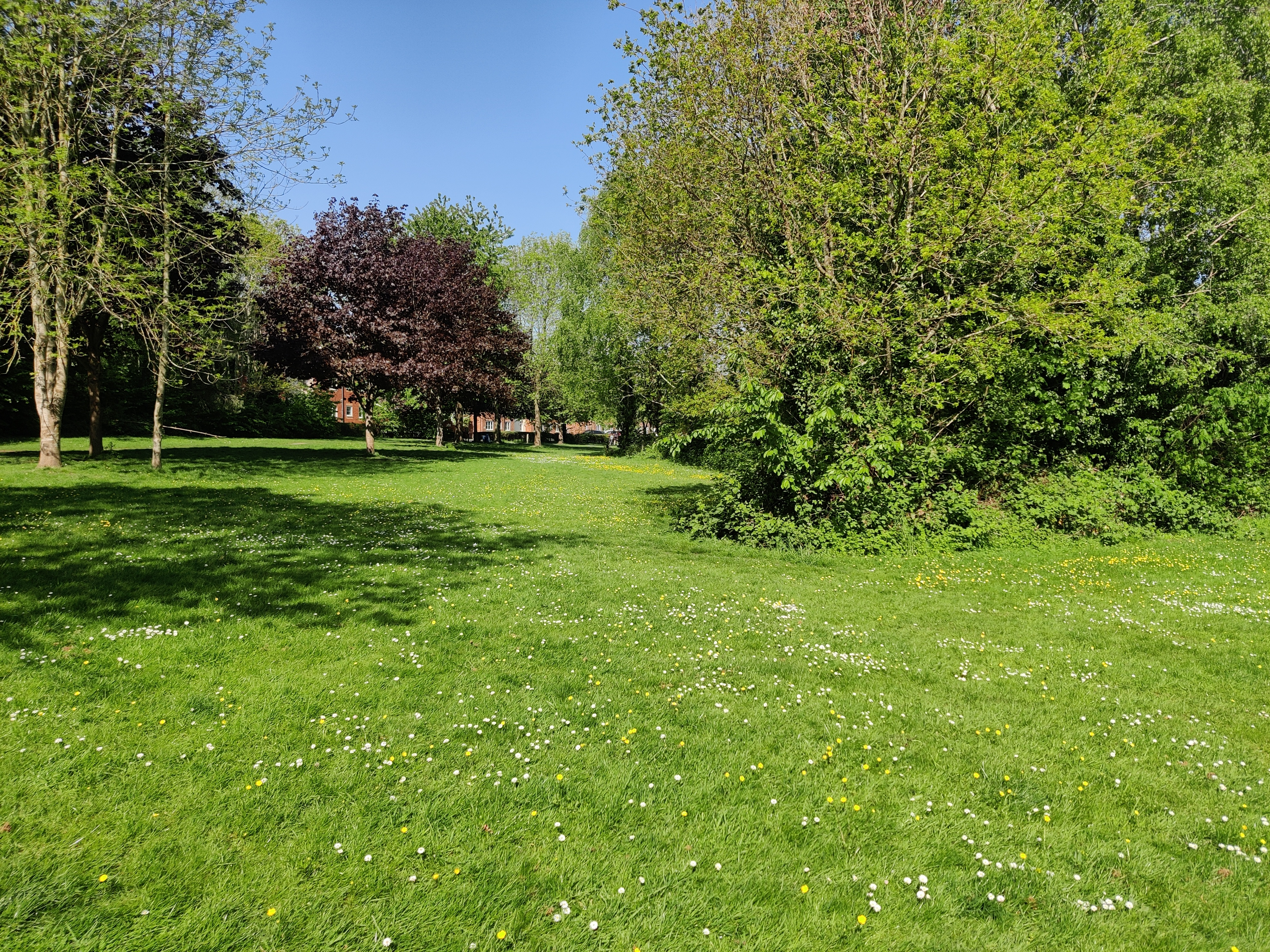
Princess Alice Park on 1 May 2026

The only pub in New Oscott is the Beggars Bush. The area also hosts the Princess Alice Retail Park, including a Tesco Extra superstore, and the adjacent Princess Alice Park green space.

The retail park was the site of a large and well known orphanage from the late 19th century, named after Princess Alice of the United Kingdom. When the site was sold for redevelopment in the 1980s the home was demolished leaving Brampton Hall which was a Community Centre serving the local area. Brampton Hall offered a range of classes and interest groups to the community and was a popular venue for parties and children's birthday parties. In recent years, this hall got knocked down and turned into a casual Italo-American chain restaurant, Frankie and Benny's, which has since been turned into a Burger King.

The area near The Beggars Bush used to be home to a traffic island which was removed and a new double traffic light system was put into place.

The name Beggar's Bush derives from a thorn bush that was located in the middle of a crossroads on the main thoroughfare, the Chester Road, and which was encircled by iron railings. At an unknown date, it is said that a beggar died after sheltering under the bush, and as the bush marked the boundary of two parishes, there was debate over who should pay for his burial. The bush was destroyed by road workers in the mid-1930s to the disapproval of locals.

Bus services in New Oscott are operated by National Express West Midlands and Diamond Bus providing links to central Birmingham, Sutton Coldfield, Erdington and Walsall. The nearest railway station is Wylde Green although more convenient for connecting bus services to New Oscott is Sutton Coldfield.
