= David Christopher McGough =

English priest (1944–2023)

The Right Reverend David Christopher McGough
- Auxiliary Bishop Emeritus of Birmingham
- Appointed: 25 October 2005
- Term ended: 18 March 2020
- Other post: Titular Bishop of Chunavia (2005–2023)

Orders
- Ordination: 14 March 1970 by Joseph Francis Cleary
- Consecration: 8 December 2005 by Vincent Gerard Nichols

Personal details
- Born: 20 November 1944 Stoke-on-Trent, England
- Died: 26 March 2023 (aged 78) Tean, England

David Christopher McGough (20 November 1944 – 26 March 2023) was an English Roman Catholic prelate.

McGough was the auxiliary bishop of Birmingham from 2005 to 2020, and also titular bishop of Chunavia until his death.

Catholic Church titles
Preceded by —	Auxiliary Bishop of Birmingham; 2005–2020	Succeeded by —
Preceded by Walter Allison Hurley	Titular Bishop of Chunavia; 2005–2023	Succeeded by Vacant
