= St Mary's College, Oscott =

Roman Catholic seminary in Birmingham, England

Coordinates: 52.543766°N 1.855451°W

Oscott College
- St Mary's College, New Oscott
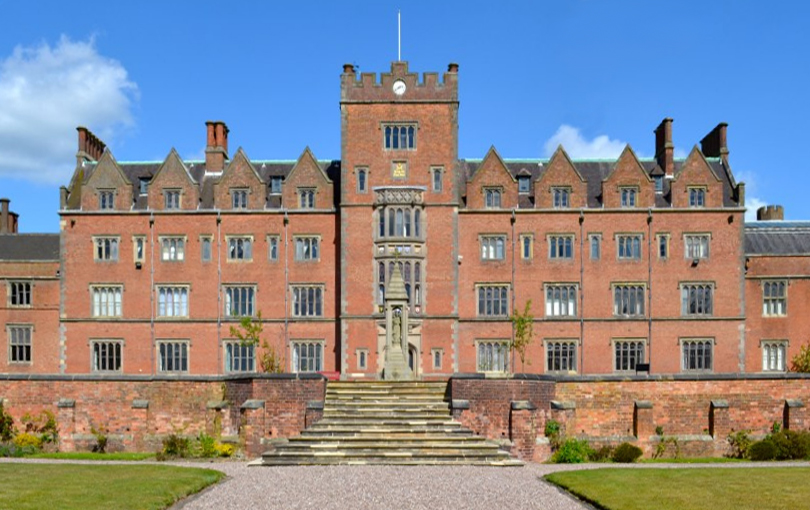
- View of the college from the south

- Location of college
- OS grid reference: SP0988894038
- Location: New Oscott, Birmingham
- Country: England
- Denomination: Roman Catholic
- Website: oscott.net

History
- Status: Seminary
- Founded: May 1794
- Founder: Thomas Walsh
- Dedication: St Mary
- Consecrated: 29 May 1838

Architecture
- Functional status: Active
- Heritage designation: Grade II* Listed
- Designated: 25 April 1952
- Architect(s): Joseph Potter; A.W. Pugin
- Style: Tudor
- Groundbreaking: 25 April 1836
- Completed: 31 May 1838
- Construction cost: £40,000

Administration
- Province: Birmingham
- Archdiocese: Birmingham
- Deanery: Birmingham (North)
- Parish: Our Lady of the Assumption Maryvale

Clergy
- Archbishop: Bernard Longley
- Rector: Canon Michael Dolman

St Mary's College in New Oscott, Birmingham, sometimes called Oscott College, is the Roman Catholic seminary of the Archdiocese of Birmingham in England and one of two seminaries of the Catholic Church in England and Wales in England, with Allen Hall Seminary in London. (Another two are in Rome: the Venerable English College, and the Pontifical Beda College for men over 30.)

== Purpose ==
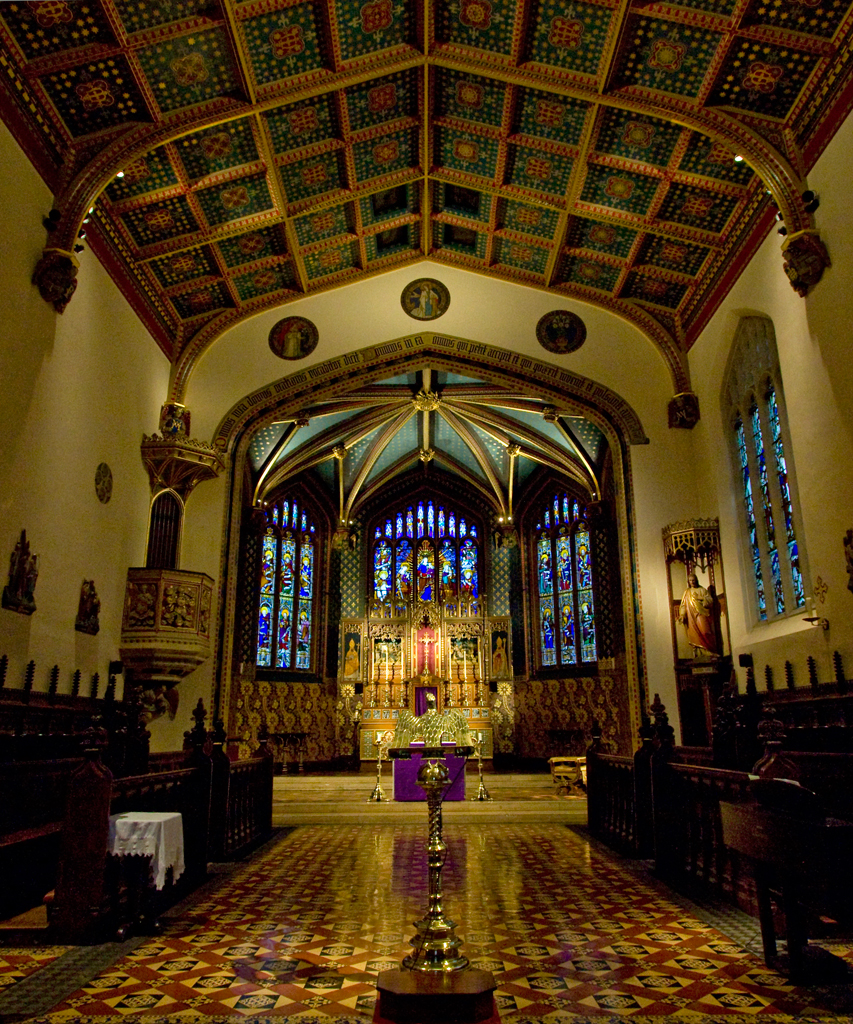
College chapel, designed by A. W. N. Pugin

Oscott College admits students for the priesthood from various dioceses of England and Wales, as well as some students from overseas. The first three years of the academic programme are validated by the University of Birmingham as a BA in Fundamental Catholic Theology. Those who complete the six-year programme, also obtain a Bachelor of Sacred Theology (STB) through affiliation with the Katholieke Universiteit Leuven.

Additionally, Oscott College is a centre for formation of candidates regarding the permanent diaconate.

== History ==
=== Old Oscott ===
The college was founded in Oscott (present-day, Great Barr), in 1794, after the Roman Catholic Relief Act 1791, for both the training of priests and the education of lay pupils. It developed out of a small mission founded by Fr Andrew Bromwich, around 1687.

=== New Oscott ===
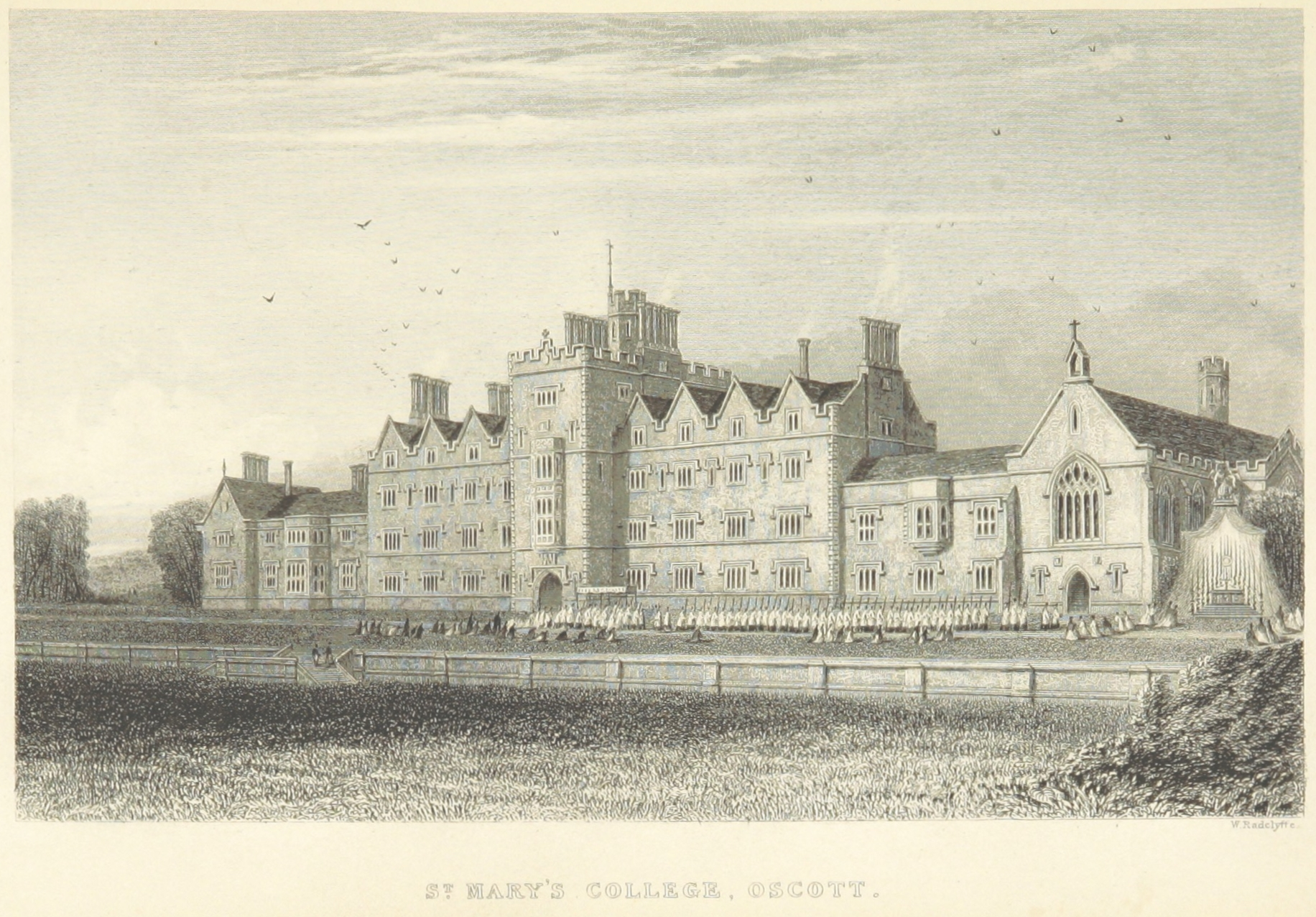
St Mary's College, 1839

In 1838, the college moved to a new site, which came to be known as New Oscott (and the original site as "Old Oscott"). The Maryvale Institute remains on the original site. The new building was designed by Augustus Pugin and Joseph Potter at a cost of £40,000. It is grade II* listed. The college quickly became a symbol of the rebirth of the Catholic faith in England and played a prominent part in the life of the Church in the 19th century. In 1889, the college was closed, but reopened the following year as a seminary only.

=== 21st Century ===
After the closure of St Cuthbert's College, Ushaw, Durham, in 2011, many of the dioceses in the province of Liverpool sent their students to Oscott to complete their training. This gave a boost in numbers at the college at a time when vocations seemed to be scarce.

Pope Benedict XVI visited on 19 September 2010, following the beatification, earlier that day in Birmingham's Cofton Park, of Cardinal Newman who stayed at the college, in the late 1840s. During his visit to Oscott, Benedict addressed the Roman Catholic bishops of England, Scotland, and Wales. The Oscott visit was the last scheduled event during the four-day 2010 State Visit of Benedict to the UK. The Pope would later depart the UK from Birmingham Airport.

In 2023, the college hosted a seminar called "Rethink Abortion Day," which was led by prominent US-based activist anti-abortion groups. The seminar was based on building on the successes experienced by the Pro-Life movement in the United States and expanding their successes into the United Kingdom.

A national Eucharistic Congress for England and Wales is scheduled to take place at the college in September 2024.

== Choral music ==
A CD of choral music, Sedes Sapientiae, performed by The Schola and recorded live in the college's chapel on 7 June 2008, was released by the college (cat. no. OSCOTTCD01).

== Notable alumni ==
=== Clergy ===
==== Bishops ====
- Francis Amherst (1819–1883), Bishop of Northampton.
- Tomás Bryan Livermore (1824–1902), Bishop of Cartagena
- Edward Bagshawe (1829–1915), Bishop of Nottingham.
- Terence Brain (1938–), Bishop of Salford.
- Kevin Dunn (1950–2008), Bishop of Hexham and Newcastle.
- William Lee (1875–1948), Bishop of Clifton.
- Leo McCartie (1925–2020), Bishop of Northampton.
- David McGough (1944-), Auxiliary Bishop of Birmingham.
- James McGuinness (1925–2007), Bishop of Nottingham.
- Robert Willson (1794–1866), Bishop of Hobart.
- David Oakley (1955), Bishop of Northampton

==== Priests ====
- William Francis Barry (1849–1930), writer.
- Frederick Charles Husenbeth (1796–1872), writer.
- Henry Weedall (1788–1859), educator.
- William Purcell Witcutt (c.1910–c.1970), author.

=== Laity ===
- John Dalberg-Acton, 1st Baron Acton (1834–1902).
- George Ashlin (1837–1921), architect.
- John Ball (1818–1889), Irish politician and naturalist.
- Wilfrid Scawen Blunt (1840–1922), poet.
- Thomas Henry Burke (1829–1882), Permanent Under Secretary at the Irish Office.
- John Cornwell (1940–), writer.
- Charles Kent (1823–1902), journalist and editor.
- Edmund Kirby (1838–1920), architect.
- Nicholas Lash (1934–2020), theologian.
- Ernest Law (1854–1930), historian and barrister.
- Edwin de Lisle MP (1852–1920), politician.
- St. George Jackson Mivart (1827–1900), biologist.
- George Moore (1852–1933), novelist.
- Francis Loraine Petre (1852–1925), civil servant and military historian.
- Thomas Nicholas Redington (1815–1862), Irish political administrator.
- Frederick Rolfe, also known as Baron Corvo (1860–1913), writer and artist.
- Joseph Stevenson (1806–1895), archivist and editor.
- Gerald Strickland, 1st Baron Strickland (1861–1940), Prime Minister of Malta.
- Charles Towneley (1803–1876) and his younger brother John (1806–1878), both were MPs, officers in the 5th Royal Lancashire Militia and trustees of the British Museum.

== Presidents and rectors ==
Presidents

- 1794–1808 John Bew
- 1808–15 Thomas Potts
- 1816–18 John Francis Quick
- 1818–25 Thomas Walsh
- 1825–40 Henry Weedall
- 1840–47 Nicholas Wiseman
- 1847–48 Henry F.C. Logan
- 1848–53 John Moore
- 1853–59 Henry Weedall
- 1859–60 George Morgan
- 1860–77 James Spencer Northcote
- 1877–80 John Hawksford
- 1880–84 Edward Acton
- 1885 Joseph Henry Souter

Rectors

- 1885–90 Joseph Henry Souter
- 1890–96 Edward Ilsley
- 1896–1924 Henry Parkinson
- 1924–29 Charles Cronin
- 1929–35 James Dey
- 1935–61 Leonard Emery
- 1961–68 Richard Foster
- 1968–79 Francis Thomas
- 1979–84 Patrick Kelly
- 1984–89 Michael Kirkham
- 1989–98 Patrick McKinney
- 1998–2001 Kevin McDonald
- 2001–13 Mark Crisp
- 2013–20 David Oakley
- 2020–21 Giles Goward
- 2021–Present: Michael Dolman

== See also ==
- Oscott Psalter
