= Old Oscott =

- Interactive map of Old Oscott
- Coordinates: 52.54696°N 1.89355°W
- Country: England
- County: West Midlands
- City: Birmingham
- Postcode: B44

Old Oscott (originally Oscott) is an area of Great Barr, Birmingham, England (previously in the parish of Handsworth, Staffordshire). The suburb forms a triangle bounded to the north by Pheasey, to the west by Perry Beeches, and to the east by Kingstanding. The Birmingham City Council ward that covers the area is called simply Oscott.

The area has been known locally as "Old" Oscott since St. Mary's College, the Roman Catholic seminary, moved to a new site in an area that became known as New Oscott.

The area was mostly developed between 1920 and 1960, with a mix of both private and council housing.

Old Oscott F.C. takes its name from the area.
