= Bishop of Hexham and Newcastle =

Catholic bishopric in England

Diocese of Hexham and Newcastle Dioecesis Hagulstadensis et Novacastrensis

catholic
- Incumbent: Stephen Wright

Location
- Country: England
- Ecclesiastical province: Liverpool
- Metropolitan: Archdiocese of Liverpool

Information
- First holder: William Hogarth
- Denomination: Roman Catholic
- Sui iuris church: Latin Church
- Rite: Roman Rite
- Established: 29 September 1850, name changed 23 May 1861
- Diocese: Hexham and Newcastle
- Cathedral: St Mary's Cathedral, Newcastle upon Tyne
- Patron saint: Saint Cuthbert Our Lady of The Immaculate Conception

Current leadership
- Pope: Leo XIV
- Bishop: Stephen Wright
- Metropolitan Archbishop: Malcolm McMahon

The Bishop of Hexham and Newcastle is the Ordinary of the Roman Catholic Diocese of Hexham and Newcastle in the Province of Liverpool, known also on occasion as the Northern Province.

== History ==
With the gradual abolition of the legal restrictions on the activities of Catholics in England and Wales in the early 19th century, Rome decided to proceed to bridge the gap of the centuries from Queen Elizabeth I by instituting Catholic dioceses on the regular historical pattern. Thus Pope Pius IX issued the Bull Universalis Ecclesiae of 29 September 1850 by which thirteen new dioceses which did not formally claim any continuity with the pre-Elizabethan English dioceses were created. The Vicariate Apostolic of the Northern District was duly elevated to diocese status as the Diocese of Hexham.

On 23 May 1861 the diocese became the Diocese of Hexham and Newcastle. In the early period from 1850 the diocese was a suffragan of the Metropolitan See of Westminster, but under Pope Pius X, on 28 October 1911, it was assigned to the newly created Province of Liverpool.

== Current situation ==
The present diocese covers an area of 7,700 km^{2} of the counties of Northumberland, Tyne and Wear, Durham and that part of Cleveland which is north of the River Tees. The see is in the City of Newcastle upon Tyne where the seat is located at the Cathedral Church of Saint Mary, which was consecrated on 21 August 1860.

The Bishop's residence was formerly Bishop's House, East Denton Hall, Newcastle upon Tyne. It is now at West Avenue, Gosforth, Newcastle upon Tyne.

The Right Reverend Séamus Cunningham, who was appointed the 13th Bishop of Hexham and Newcastle by Pope Benedict XVI on 9 January 2009. He had previously served as Vicar General and Diocesan Administrator. He was ordained on 20 March 2009, the Feast of Saint Cuthbert, patron of the diocese. He retired at the age of 76 in February 2019.

The previous bishop is the Right Reverend Robert Byrne. He was installed on 25 March 2019 in St Mary's Cathedral, Newcastle upon Tyne. Bishop Byrne submitted his resignation early, at the age of 66, citing that his episcopal ministry had become "too great a burden." His resignation was accepted by the Holy See on 12 December 2022.

== Past and present ordinaries ==
From 1850 to 1861 the title was Bishop of Hexham, and since 1861 it has been Bishop of Hexham and Newcastle. By the decree of 29 September 1850 by Pope Pius IX, the Roman Catholic hierarchy was restored in England and Wales. Much of the Vicariate Apostolic of the Northern District of England became the Diocese of Hexham, and the Vicar Apostolic of the district became the Bishop of Hexham. The Diocese of Hexham comprised Northumberland, County Durham, Cumberland and Westmorland. The patrons of the diocese were Our Blessed Lady Immaculate and St Cuthbert.

On 22 April 1861, the Propaganda congregation decreed that St Mary's Cathedral, Newcastle upon Tyne should be the bishop's seat, and the Episcopal see should be renamed the Diocese of Hexham and Newcastle. The decree was approved by Pope Pius IX on 7 March, and was expedited on 23 May 1861.

Bishops of Hexham
From	Until	Incumbent	Notes
1850	1861	William Hogarth	Formerly Vicar Apostolic of the Northern District and Titular Bishop of Samosata (1848–1850). Appointed Bishop of Hexham on 29 September 1850. His episcopal title changed to Bishop of Hexham and Newcastle on 23 May 1861.
In 1861, the bishopric changed its name to Hexham and Newcastle.
Bishops of Hexham and Newcastle
From	Until	Incumbent	Notes
1861	1866	William Hogarth	Previously Vicar Apostolic of the Northern District (1848–1850). Appointed Bishop of Hexham on 29 September 1850. The episcopal title changed to Bishop of Hexham and Newcastle on 23 May 1861. Died in office on 29 January 1866.
1866	1882	James Chadwick	Appointed bishop on 12 August 1866 and consecrated on 18 October 1866. Died in office on 14 May 1882.
1882	1886	John William Bewick	Appointed bishop on 25 September 1882 and consecrated on 18 October 1882. Died in office on 29 October 1886.
1887	1889	Henry O'Callaghan	Appointed bishop on 1 October 1887 and consecrated on 18 January 1888. Resigned on 19 September 1889 and appointed Titular Archbishop of Nicosia. Died on 10 October 1904.
1889	1909	Thomas William Wilkinson	Formerly an auxiliary bishop of Hexham and Newcastle (1888–1889). Appointed Diocesan Bishop of Hexham and Newcastle on 28 December 1889. Died in office on 17 April 1909.
1909	1924	Richard Collins	Formerly an auxiliary bishop of Hexham and Newcastle (1905–1909). Appointed Diocesan Bishop of Hexham and Newcastle on 21 June 1909. Died in office on 9 February 1924.
1924	1936	Joseph Thorman	Appointed bishop on 18 December 1924 and consecrated on 27 January 1925. Died in office on 7 October 1936.
1936	1958	Joseph McCormack	Appointed bishop on 30 December 1936 and consecrated on 4 February 1937. Died in office on 2 March 1958.
1958	1974	James Cunningham	Formerly an auxiliary bishop of Hexham and Newcastle (1957–1958). Appointed Diocesan Bishop of Hexham and Newcastle on 1 July 1958. Resigned on 16 May 1974 and died on 10 July 1974.
1974	1992	Hugh Lindsay	Formerly an auxiliary bishop of Hexham and Newcastle (1969–1974). Appointed Diocesan Bishop of Hexham and Newcastle on 12 December 1974. Resigned on 11 January 1992 and died on 19 January 2009.
1992	2004	Ambrose Griffiths, O.S.B.	Appointed bishop on 11 January 1992 and consecrated on 20 March 1992. Died on 14 June 2011.
2004	2008	Kevin John Dunn	Appointed bishop on 26 March 2004 and consecrated on 25 May 2004. Died in office on 1 March 2008.
2009	2019	Séamus Cunningham	Appointed bishop on 9 January 2009 and consecrated on 20 March 2009.
2019	2022	Robert Byrne, C.O.	Formerly Auxiliary Bishop of Birmingham. Appointed bishop on 4 February 2019 and installed on 25 March 2019. Resigned on 12 December 2022.
2023	present	Stephen Wright	Formerly Auxiliary Bishop of Birmingham. Appointed bishop on 14 June 2023 and installed on 19 July 2023.

== Bibliography ==
- Brady, W. Maziere (1876). The Episcopal Succession in England, Scotland and Ireland, A.D. 1400 to 1875. Vol. 3. Rome: Tipografia Della Pace.
