= Diocese of Shrewsbury =

Catholic diocese in England

Diocese of Shrewsbury Dioecesis Salopiensis

Catholic
- Coat of arms

Location
- Country: England
- Territory: Shropshire; Cheshire
- Ecclesiastical province: Province of Birmingham
- Coordinates: 52.708°N 2.754°W

Statistics
- Area: 6,136 km^{2} (2,369 sq mi)
- Population: Total; Catholics: (as of 2014); 1,923,400; 189,827 (9.9%)
- Parishes: 92

Information
- Denomination: Catholic
- Sui iuris church: Latin Church
- Rite: Roman Rite
- Established: 29 September 1850; 176 years ago
- Cathedral: Shrewsbury Cathedral
- Secular priests: 141

Current leadership
- Pope: Leo XIV
- Bishop: Mark Davies
- Metropolitan Archbishop: Bernard Longley
- Vicar General: Michael Gannon; Philip Moor
- Episcopal Vicars: Michael Gannon; Philip Moor; Jonathan Mitchell; David Roberts

Map
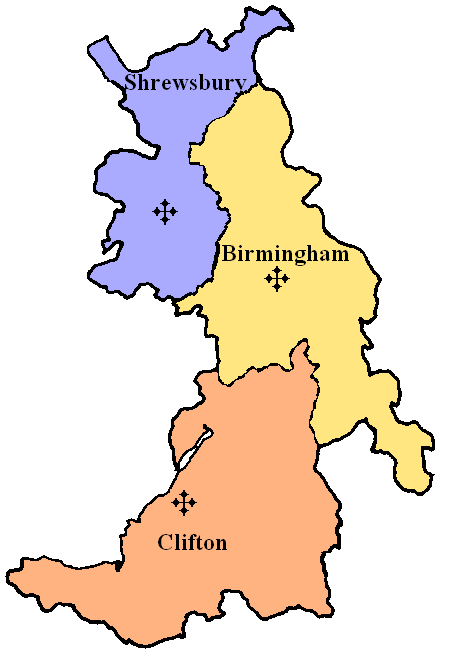
- Diocese of Shrewsbury within the Province of Birmingham

Website
- dioceseofshrewsbury.org

The Diocese of Shrewsbury (Latin: Dioecesis Salopiensis) is a Latin Church diocese of the Catholic Church in the Province of Birmingham which encompasses the historic English counties of Shropshire and Cheshire.

The diocese includes rural areas of Shropshire as well as parts of urban Greater Manchester south of the River Mersey such as Birkenhead, Stockport and Altrincham. The current bishop, Mark Davies, succeeded on 1 October 2010.

== Geographical location ==
The diocese comprises the counties of Shropshire and Cheshire and the parts of Greater Manchester and Merseyside which were formerly in Cheshire. Before 1895, it also included North Wales (then lost for the erection of the Roman Catholic Diocese of Menevia, now, since 1987, in that of Wrexham). In 2007, new pastoral areas and regions were created, replacing the former deaneries.

| Region | Name | Regional Dean |
|---|---|---|
| A | Shropshire and Wrekin | Stephan Coonan |
| B | Central Cheshire | John Daly |
| C | North Cheshire | Russell Cooke |
| D | South Trafford & Wythenshawe | |
| E | Stockport & Tameside | |
| F | Wirral | |

== Past and present bishops ==
=== Ordinaries ===
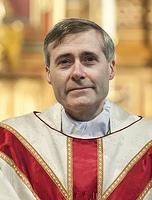
Mark Davies is the current Roman Catholic Bishop of Shrewsbury.

- James Brown (appointed 27 June 1851 – died 14 October 1881)
- Edmund James Knight (appointed 25 April 1882 – resigned 28 May 1895)
- John Carroll (succeeded 11 May 1895 – died 14 January 1897)
- Samuel Webster Allen (appointed 19 April 1897 – died 13 May 1908)
- Hugh Singleton (appointed 1 August 1908 – died 17 December 1934)
- Ambrose James Moriarty (succeeded 17 December 1934 – died 3 June 1949)
- John Aloysius Murphy (succeeded 3 June 1949 – translated to the Archdiocese of Cardiff on 22 August 1961)
- William Eric Grasar (appointed 26 April 1962 – resigned 20 March 1980)
- Joseph Gray (appointed 19 August 1980 – retired 23 June 1995)
- Brian Michael Noble (appointed 23 June 1995 – retired 1 October 2010)
- Mark Davies (current bishop, succeeded 1 October 2010)

=== Coadjutor Bishops ===
- John Carroll (1893–1895)
- Mark Davies (2009–2010)
- Ambrose James Moriarty (1931–1934)
- John Aloysius Murphy (1948–1949)

=== Auxiliary Bishops ===
- John (Jack) Brewer (1971–1983), appointed Coadjutor Bishop of Lancaster
- Edmund James Knight (1879–1882), appointed Bishop here

=== Other priests of this diocese who became bishops ===
- Philip Anthony Egan, appointed Bishop of Portsmouth in 2012
- Francis Edward Joseph Mostyn, appointed Vicar Apostolic of Wales, Wales in 1895
- Gerard William Tickle, appointed Bishop of Great Britain, Military in 1963

== Catholic education in the diocese ==
There are 112 Catholic schools and colleges serving 43,198 pupils.

| School type | Voluntary Aided Primary | Voluntary Aided Secondary | Sixth Form Colleges | Independent Schools | Primary Academies | Secondary Academies |
|---|---|---|---|---|---|---|
| Number of schools | 76 | 8 | 1 | 6 | 10 | 11 |
| Number of Students | 18,768 | 7,236 | 2,179 | 1,217 | 3,027 | 10,771 |

- All figures are as of August 2019

== Patron saints of the diocese ==
1) Our Lady, Help of Christians – 24 May
2) Saint Winefride – 3 November

== Parish pastoral areas and regions ==
On 1 October 2007, local deaneries were abolished and parishes grouped together to form 'Pastoral Areas', not as a replacement of parishes but to strengthen local Catholic communities, ensuring the sharing of services and groups and to avoid unnecessary duplication.
Each LPT (local pastoral team [see below]) has two co-leaders (one priest; one layperson) and each region is headed by a Regional Dean.

=== Region A – Shropshire & Wrekin Catholic Region ===
It is sub-divided into five pastoral areas, which in turn contain 19 parishes.

Prior to October 2007, two deaneries - Shrewsbury & West Shropshire and Telford & East Shropshire - existed. In line with diocesan restructuring by Bishop Brian Noble, these were merged to form the Shropshire Pastoral Area.

The deanery comprises the whole of Shropshire. Catholic population (2008): 13,341

Regional Dean: Stephen Coonan

| Region | Pastoral Area | Parishes/Mass Centres | Primary Schools | Secondary Schools | Hospitals & Other Chaplaincies |
|---|---|---|---|---|---|
| A | LPA 1 | Shrewsbury Cathedral (http://www.shrewsburycathedral.org/) Monkmoor, St Winefride; Harlescott, Our Lady of Pity | St Mary's St Winefride's | Holy Trinity Academy | Royal Shrewsbury Shropshire Nuffield; S & Mid W Hospice + Prison + Forces |
| A | LPA 2 | Ellesmere, St Michael Farndon; Malpas, St Joseph; Oswestry, Our Lady; Shawbury, St Andrew & St Peter; Tattenhall, St Plegmund; Wem, Our Lady; Whitchurch, St George | Our Lady & St Oswald | Holy Trinity Academy | Robert Jones & Agnes Hunt H + Forces |
| A | LPA 3 | Church Stretton, St Milburga Cleobury Mortimer, St Elizabeth; Ludlow, St Peter (http://freespace.virgin.net/stpeters.ludlow/); Plowden, St Walburga | Moor Park | Holy Trinity Academy | |
| A | LPA 4 | Bridgnorth, St John Broseley; Donnington, Our Lady Telford, The Good Shepherd (Madeley, Stirchley & Dawley); Wellington, St Patrick (http://www.stpatrickstelford.com/) | St John's St Luke's; St Mary's, Madeley; St Patrick's | Holy Trinity Academy | Princess Royal |
| A | LPA 5 | Albrighton, St Joseph Market Drayton, Ss Thomas & Newport, Ss Peter & Paul; Shifnal, St Mary | Ss Peter & Paul's St Mary's, Madeley; St Winefride's | Holy Trinity Academy | (+Cosford) + Stoke Heath + TernHill |

=== Region B – Central Cheshire ===
Regional Dean: John Daly

| Region | Pastoral Area | Parishes/Mass Centres | Primary Schools | Secondary Schools | Hospitals & Other Chaplaincies |
|---|---|---|---|---|---|
| B | LPA 6 | Alderley Edge, St Pius X Handforth, St Benedict (http://www.stbenedictshandforth.co.uk/); Knutsford, St Vincent (http://www.stvincentsknutsford.org/); Wilmslow, St Teresa | St Benedict's St Vincent's | All Hallows CH St Nicholas CH | Styal Prison |
| B | LPA 7 | Bollington, St Gregory Congleton, St Mary; Disley; Macclesfield, St Alban; Macclesfield, St Edward; Poynton, St Paul; Whaley Bridge, Sacred Heart | St Alban's St Edward's; St Gregory's; St Mary's; St Mary's | All Hallows CH | Macclesfield District Gen East Cheshire Hospice |
| B | LPA 8 | Barnton, Our Lady of Fatima Holmes Chapel, St Margaret; Middlewich, St Mary; Northwich, St Wilfrid; Weaverham, St Bede; Winsford, St Joseph | St Bede's St Joseph's; St Mary's; St Wilfrid's | St Nicholas CH | St Luke's Hospice |
| B | LPA 9 | Alsager, St Gabriel Crewe, St Mary (http://www.stmaryscrewe.org.uk/); Nantwich, St Anne; Sandbach, St Winefride | St Anne's St Gabriel's; St Mary's | St Thomas More CH | Leighton Hosp + M'chester Metropolitan Univ; Crewe & Alsager site |

=== Region C – North Cheshire ===
Regional Dean: Russell Cooke

| Region | Pastoral Area | Parishes/Mass Centres | Primary Schools | Secondary Schools | Hospitals & Other Chaplaincies |
|---|---|---|---|---|---|
| C | LPA 10 | Ellesmere Port, Our Lady Ellesmere Port, St Bernard; Ellesmere Port, St Saviour; Hooton, St Mary | Our Lady star of the Sea St Bernard's; St Mary of the Angels; St Saviour's Infants; St Saviour's Juniors | Ellesmere Port Catholic High | Ellesmere Port Hospice Good Shepherd Hospice |
| C | LPA 11 | Blacon, St Theresa Chester, St Francis; Chester, St Werburgh; Lache, St Clare; Mouldsworth; Plas Newton, St Columba; Tarporley, St Thomas Becket; Waverton | St Clare's St Theresa's; St Werburgh & St Col's; St Wilfrid's | Chester Catholic High School St Nicholas Catholic High | Countess of Chester Grosvenor Nuffield + Forces |
| C | LPA 12 | Castlefields, St Augustine Frodsham, St Luke; Halton Brook, Holy Spirit; Murdishaw, St Martin; Palace Fields, Our Lady; Runcorn, St Edward | Holy Spirit Our Lady's; St Augustine's; St Clement's; St Edward's; St Luke's; St Martin's | Chester Catholic High School St Chad's Catholic High | Halton General Hospital Halton Haven Hospice |
| C | LPA 13 | Appleton, St Monica Latchford, Our Lady & St Augustine; Lymm, St Winefride | Our Lady's St Augustine's; St Monica's | Cardinal Newman Catholic High | North Cheshire Hospital + Thorn Cross YOI |

=== Region D – South Trafford & Wythenshawe ===
Regional Dean: John Rafferty

| Region | Pastoral Area | Parishes/Mass Centres | Primary Schools | Secondary Schools | Hospitals & Other Chaplaincies |
|---|---|---|---|---|---|
| D | LPA 14 | Baguley, Sacred Heart & St Peter Benchill, St John & St Thomas; Northenden, St Hilda & St Aidan; Peel Hall, St Elizabeth; Woodhouse Park, St Anthony | Sacred Heart St Aidan's; St Anthony's; St Elizabeth's; St John's; St Peter's | St Paul's CH | Wythenshawe General |
| D | LPA 15 | Altrincham, St Vincent Hale Barns, Holy Angels; Timperley, St John; West Timperley, St Hugh | St Hugh's St Vincent's Infants; St Vincent's Juniors; Loreto Prep; St Ambrose Prep | Blessed Thomas Holford St Ambrose College; Loreto Grammar School | St Ann's Hospice |
| D | LPA 16 | Ashton-on-Mersey, All Saints Partington, Our Lady; Sale, St Joseph; Sale, St Margaret Ward; Sale Moor, Holy Family | All Saints Holy Family; Our Lady of Lourdes; St Joseph's; St Margaret Ward's | Blessed Thomas Holford St Ambrose College; Loreto Grammar School | |

=== Region E – Stockport & Tameside ===
Regional Dean:

| Region | Pastoral Area | Parishes/Mass Centres | Primary Schools | Secondary Schools | Hospitals & Other Chaplaincies |
|---|---|---|---|---|---|
| E | LPA 17 | Brinnington, St Bernadette Marple, Holy Spirit; Offerton, St Philip; Romiley, Our Lady & St Christopher; Stockport, St Joseph | St Joseph's St Bernadette's; Cheadle Infants & Junior; St Philip's; St Christopher's (St Mary's, Marple Bridge) | Harrytown CH Aquinas College | Stepping Hill Hospital Cherry Tree Hospital |
| E | LPA 18 | Dukinfield, St Mary Hattersley, St James; Hyde, St Paul; Stalybridge, St Peter; Stalybridge, St Raphael | St James' St Mary's; St Paul's; St Peter's; St Raphael's | All Saints CC | |
| E | LPA 19 | Cheadle, St Chad Cheadle Hulme, St Ann; Heald Green, Christ Church (http://www.christchurchhg.co.uk/) | Cheadle Infants Cheadle Juniors | St James CH Aquinas College | Cheadle Royal Hospital Stepping Hill Hospital; Alexandra Hospital; St Ann's Hospice |
| E | LPA 20 | Adswood, St Ambrose Bramhall, St Vincent; Hazel Grove, St Peter; Edgeley, Our Lady | Cheadle Infant Cheadle Primary; Our Lady's; St Ambrose; St Peter's; St Simon's | Harrytown CH St James CH; Aquinas College | Stepping Hill Hospital |

=== Region F – Wirral ===
Regional Dean: Nick Kern

| Region | Pastoral Area | Parishes/Mass Centres | Primary Schools | Secondary Schools | Hospitals & Other Chaplaincies |
|---|---|---|---|---|---|
| F | LPA 21 | Leasowe, Our Lady of Lourdes Liscard, St Alban; New Brighton, Ss Peter & Paul; Seacombe, Our Lady & St Joseph; Wallasey Village, English Martyrs | Our Lady of Lourdes St Alban's; St Joseph's; Ss Peter & Paul's | St Mary's St Anselm's; Upton Hall | |
| F | LPA 22 | Moreton, Sacred Heart Greasby, Our Lady of Pity; West Kirby, St Agnes; Hoylake, Ss Catherine & Martina | Sacred Heart Our Lady of Lourdes; St Alban's; St Joseph's; Ss Peter & Paul's | St Mary's St Anselm's; Upton Hall | |
| F | LPA 23 | Heswall, Our Lady & St John Neston, St Winefride; Pensby, Holy Family | Our Lady of Lourdes St Alban's; St Joseph's; Ss Peter & Paul's | St Mary's Chester Catholic High School; St Anselm's; Upton Hall | Murrayfield Hospital |
| F | LPA 24 | Bebington, St Luke Bromborough, Christ the King; New Ferry, St John; Rock Ferry, St Anne | St Anne's Christ the King; St John's Infants; St John's Juniors | St John Plessington St Anselm's; Upton Hall | Clatterbridge Hospital St John's Hospice |
| F | LPA 25 | Birkenhead, St Joseph Noctorum, St Peter; Oxton, Holy Name; Upton, St Joseph; Woodchurch, St Michael & All Angels | St Joseph's, B'head St Joseph's, Upton; St Michael's; St Peter's; Redcourt | St John Plessington St Mary's; St Anselm's; Upton Hall | Arrowe Park Hospital |
| F | LPA 26 | Birkenhead, Holy Cross & St Paul Birkenhead, Our Lady; Birkenhead, St Werburgh & St Laurence | Holy Cross Our Lady's; St Laurence's; St Paul's; St Werburgh's | Plessington St Mary's; St Anselm's; Upton Hall | |

== Modern history ==
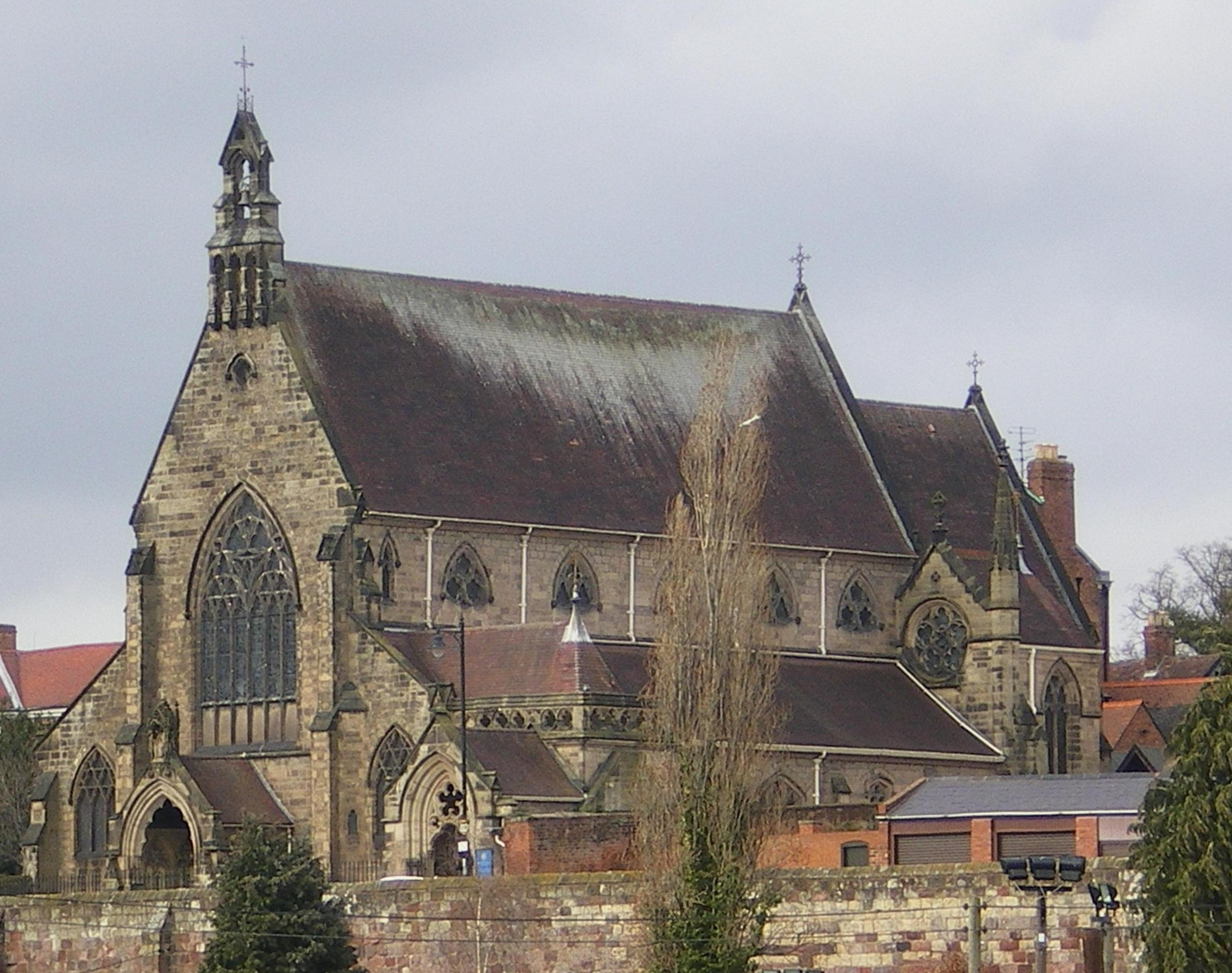
Shrewsbury Cathedral was opened in 1856

The first bishop of the diocese was James Brown, president of Sedgeley Park School, who was consecrated 27 July 1851. Out of a total population of 1,082,617, Catholics numbered about 20,000. There were thirty churches and chapels attended by resident priests, and six stations; one convent, that of the Faithful Companions of Jesus, in Birkenhead, to which was attached a boarding school for young women, and also a small day-school for poor children. There were Jesuits at Holywell, who also had a college at St. Bruno's, Flintshire, and a Benedictine at Acton Burnell. When Brown celebrated the jubilee of his consecration, the secular priests had increased to sixty-six and the regulars to thirty-two. Instead of one religious house of men and one of women, there were now four of men and nine of women; and many elementary schools had been provided for the needs of Catholic children.

In 1852 the bitter feeling caused by the re-establishment of the hierarchy found vent in serious riots at Stockport. On 29 June a large mob attacked the Church of St Philip and St James; they broke the windows and attempted to force in the doors, but before they could effect an entrance, Randolph Frith, the rector, succeeded in removing the Blessed Sacrament, and secreting it with the chalices, etc., in a small cupboard in the side chapel. He was compelled to flee immediately to the belltower, and, whilst the rabble were destroying whatever they could lay their hands upon, he made his escape along the roof, and descended by the spouting at the back of the presbytery. Much of the church furniture, with vestments, etc., was piled up in the street and burned. At St Michael's, the Host was desecrated, and the pyx and ciborium carried away.

Although the Catholic population of the diocese was 58,013 (as of the early 20th century), Shropshire contributed under 3,000, partly on account of agricultural depression and the consequent flocking to industrial centres. There were ninety clergy, sixteen convents, representatives of four orders of men, eight secondary schools for girls, an orphanage and industrial school for boys, a home for aged poor, a home for penitents, and an orphanage erected in memory of Bishop Knight. At Oakwood Hall, Romiley, a house of retreats for working-men opened and had done important work; and at New Brighton, the nuns of Our Lady of the Cenacle opened a house of retreats for working-women and ladies.

Shropshire is rich in archaeological interest, its pre-Reformation parish churches, the ruins of monasteries around the Wrekin, the Roman city of Viroconium (Wroxeter), the castle of Ludlow, giving the county a place apart in the heart of the antiquary. In Shrewsbury itself, where once Grey, Black, and Austin Friars and the Black Monks of St. Benedict had foundations, there is now the cathedral, designed by Edward Pugin. Chester, too, with its streets, black and white houses, and cathedral and city walls, claims the visitor's attention. When the body of Daniel O'Connell was brought back from Genoa, it rested in the old chapel in Queen's Street on its way to Ireland.

== See also ==
- Diocese of Shrewsbury Lourdes Hospitalité
- Diocese of Shrewsbury Lourdes Pilgrimage
- List of Catholic churches in the United Kingdom
