= John Carroll =

John Carroll may refer to:

== People ==
=== Academia and science ===
- Sir John Carroll (astronomer) (1899–1974), British astronomer
- John Carroll (author) (born 1944), Australian sociologist, academic, and writer
- John Alexander Carroll (died 2000), American history professor
- John Bissell Carroll (1916–2003), American cognitive scientist
- John M. Carroll (information scientist) (born 1950), American information scientist
- John L. Carroll (1943–2023), American legal academic

=== Literature ===
- John Francis Carroll (1858–1917), newspaper publisher and editor
- John Carroll (journalist) (1942–2015), American journalist and editor
- John Carroll (author) (born 1944), Australian sociologist, academic, and writer

=== Politics ===
- John Carroll (mayor) (1836–1903), mayor of Dunedin
- John E. Carroll (1877–1955), mayor of Seattle
- John A. Carroll (1901–1983), American jurist and politician in Colorado
- John Carroll (Ohio politician) (died 1985), member of the Ohio House of Representatives
- John Carroll (Manitoba politician) (1921–1986), Canadian politician in Manitoba
- John Carroll (Hawaii politician) (1929–2021), member of the Hawaii Senate and House of Representatives
- John Carroll (trade unionist) (1925–2018), Irish trade unionist and senator
- John Lee Carroll (1830–1911), American politician in Maryland
- John M. Carroll (politician) (1823–1901), U.S. representative from New York
- John W. Carroll, member of the Illinois House of Representatives

=== Religion ===
- John Carroll (archbishop of Baltimore) (1735–1815), prelate of the Roman Catholic Church
- John Carroll (bishop of Shrewsbury) (1838–1897), Irish-born prelate of the Roman Catholic Church
- John Carroll (Australian bishop) (1865–1949), Irish-born Roman Catholic bishop of Lismore, Australia
- John Patrick Carroll (1864–1925), bishop of Helena, Montana

=== Sports ===
- John Carroll (rugby union) (1934–1998), Australian rugby union player
- John Carroll (basketball) (born 1955), American basketball coach
- John Carroll (cricketer) (born 1972), English cricketer
- John Carroll (hurler) (born 1978), Irish hurler

=== Other people ===
- John Carroll (soldier) (1891–1971), Australian Victoria Cross recipient
- John Wesley Carroll (1892–1959), American modernist painter
- John Carroll (actor) (1906–1979), American actor
- John Carroll (Survivor contestant), American contestant of Survivor: Marquesas
- John F. Carroll (1932–1969), American man with gigantism
- Jack the Bulldog, mascot of the Georgetown University Hoyas athletics teams whose incarnations are named John Carroll or similar

== Other uses ==
- Statue of John Carroll, a statue of the archbishop at Georgetown University
- John Carroll Society, an organization for Catholic laypersons
- John Carroll University, a Catholic Jesuit school in Ohio
- The John Carroll School, a Catholic secondary school in Maryland

== See also ==
- Jack Carroll (disambiguation)
- John Carrell (disambiguation)
- Johnny Carroll (disambiguation)
- Jon Carroll (born 1943), American journalist
- Jonathan Carroll (disambiguation)
- John Caryll (disambiguation)
- John Carroll Catholic High School (disambiguation)
- John Carroll Lynch (born 1963), American actor
- Jean Carroll (disambiguation)
