= St Columba's Church, Chester =

St Columba's Church
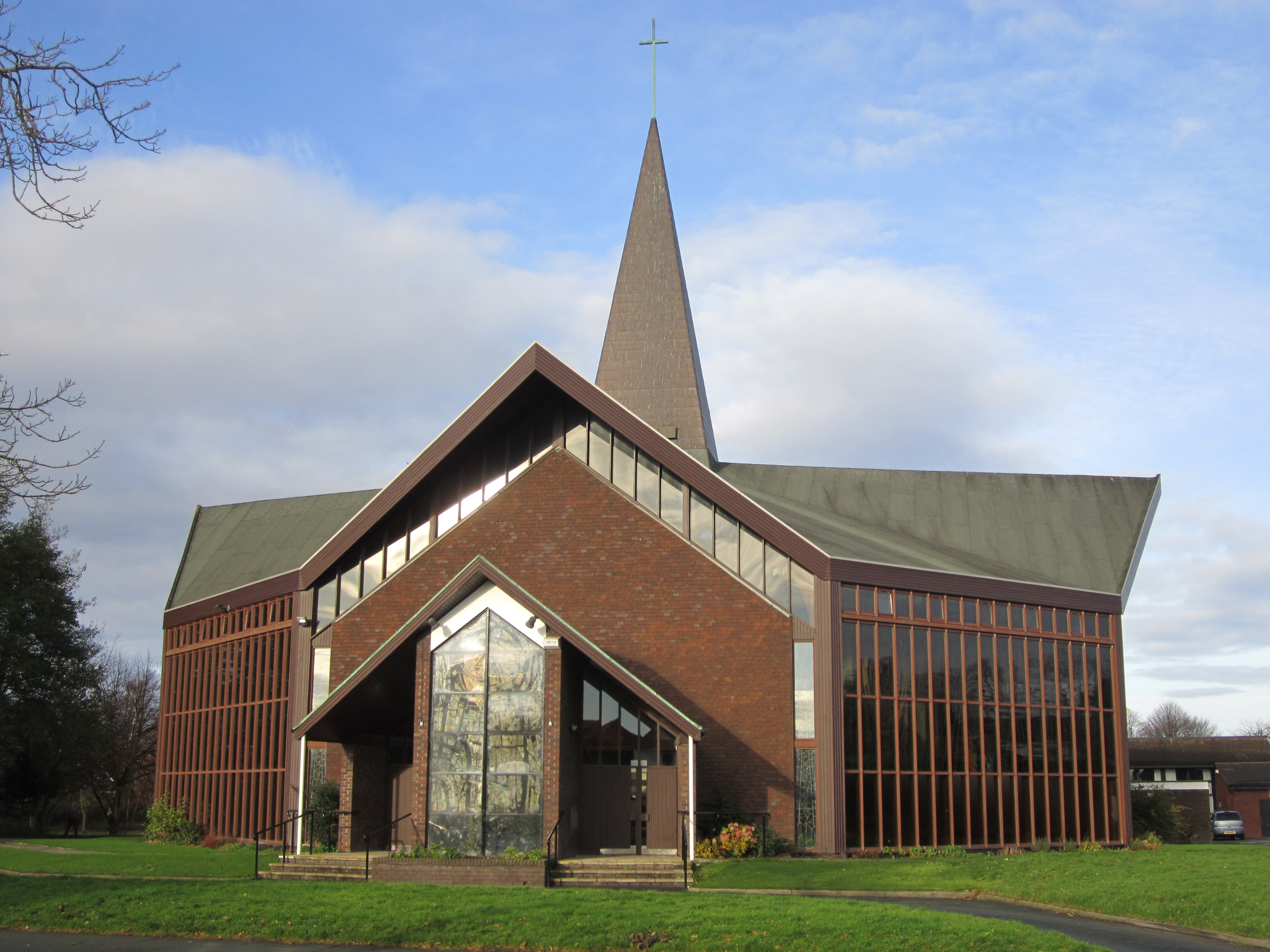
- Church entrance
- St Columba's Church
- 53.2109°N 2.8726°W
- OS grid reference: SJ 41821 68557
- Location: Newton, Chester
- Country: England
- Denomination: Roman Catholic
- Website: StColumbaChester.WordPress.com

History
- Status: Active
- Founder: Canon Francis Murphy
- Dedication: Saint Columba

Architecture
- Functional status: Parish church
- Architect: Francis Prichard
- Groundbreaking: 6 September 1964
- Completed: 19 February 1966

Administration
- Province: Birmingham
- Diocese: Shrewsbury
- Deanery: North Cheshire

St Columba's is a Roman Catholic Parish church in Newton, Chester. It was built from 1964 to 1965. It is situated on the corner of Plas Newton Lane and Newhall Road in the suburbs, north of the city centre. The 'Taking Stock' project, a partnership between the Patrimony Committee of the Bishops' Conference, English Heritage and individual catholic dioceses, described the church as 'a strikingly modern church in a distinctive style'.

== History ==
=== Construction ===
In the late 1950s, a priest from St Werburgh's Church in Chester, Canon Francis Murphy, came to Newton and started raising funds to build a new church for the local Catholic population. On 6 September 1964, he laid the foundation stone for the church. It was designed by Francis Prichard (1919 – 2008). He was an ecclesiastical architect and was also the Mayor of Crosby. The first Mass was said in the church on 19 December 1965. On 19 February 1966, the church was officially opened by William Grasar, Roman Catholic Bishop of Shrewsbury.

=== Parish Hall ===
In 1978, the parish hall was also opened by Bishop Glaser. It was built by the Manpower Services Commission. In 2012, it hosted the Annual General Meeting of the British Heart Foundation.

== See also ==
- St Werburgh's Church, Chester
