= Samuel Allen (bishop) =

English bishop (1844–1908)

Styles of Samuel Allen
- Reference style: The Right Reverend
- Spoken style: My Lord
- Religious style: Bishop

Samuel Webster Allen (23 March 1844 – 13 May 1908) was an English bishop of the Roman Catholic Church. He was the Bishop of Shrewsbury from 1897 to 1908.

Born at 78 Lord Street, Stockport, Cheshire on 23 March 1844, Allen was educated at St Mary's College, Oscott, then on scholarship entered the English College, Rome. He was ordained to the priesthood on 4 December 1870. He served as reporting stenographer at the Vatican Councils in 1869-1870.

He returned to England, where he was Secretary to the Provincial Council of the Archdiocese of Westminster in 1873. In October 1879 he came to Shrewsbury, Shropshire, as secretary to James Brown, then Bishop of Shrewsbury, and was appointed Canon at the Catholic Cathedral there in 1883. He was also active in town life as Vice-Chairman of the Shrewsbury School Board (established 1881) and of the Atcham Board of Guardians, and was for some 20 years Roman Catholic chaplain at Shrewsbury Prison. He gave up these public offices when he was appointed the Bishop of Shrewsbury by the Holy See on 16 June 1897. His consecration to the episcopate took place on 16 June 1897, the principal consecrator was Cardinal Herbert Vaughan, Archbishop of Westminster, and the principal co-consecrators were Edward Ilsley, Bishop (later Archbishop) of Birmingham and Francis Mostyn, Bishop of Menevia (later Archbishop of Cardiff).

Allen died in office at the Cathedral House, Belmont, Shrewsbury of pneumonia, after being ill since the previous October, on 13 May 1908, aged 64 and was buried in the General Cemetery in Longden Road, Shrewsbury.

Ambrose Moriarty, the later sixth Bishop of Shrewsbury, also born in Stockport, was his nephew.

Catholic Church titles
Preceded by John Carroll	Bishop of Shrewsbury; 1897–1908	Succeeded by Hugh Singleton
