= Thomas Brice =

Thomas Brice may refer to:

- Tom Brice (born 1981), Australian baseball player
- Thomas Brice (martyrologist) (1536–1571), Church of England clergyman, martyrologist and poet
- Tom Brice, character in Across the Continent
- Thomas Hastie Bryce (1862–1946), Scottish anatomist, medical author and archaeologist
