= Edmund Knight =

Styles of Edmund Knight
- Reference style: The Right Reverend
- Spoken style: My Lord
- Religious style: Bishop

Edmund Knight (27 August 1827 – 9 June 1905) was an English prelate of the Roman Catholic Church. He served as the Bishop of Shrewsbury from 1882 to 1895.

Born in Sheffield on 27 August 1827, he was ordained to the priesthood on 19 December 1857. He was appointed an auxiliary bishop of Diocese of Shrewsbury and Titular Bishop of Corycus on 30 May 1879. His consecration to the Episcopate took place on 27 July 1879, the principal consecrator was Cardinal Henry Edward Manning, Archbishop of Westminster, and the principal co-consecrators were Herbert Vaughan, Bishop of Salford, and Edward Gilpin Bagshawe, Bishop of Nottingham. Nearly three years later, he was appointed the Bishop of Shrewsbury on 25 April 1882.

He resigned as Bishop of Shrewsbury on 28 May 1895, and appointed Titular Bishop of Flavias. He died on 9 June 1905 at 25 Kensington Court, Kensington, London, aged 77, and was buried at Flaybrick Hill Cemetery, Birkenhead, Cheshire.

Catholic Church titles
Preceded by James Brown	Bishop of Shrewsbury; 1882–1895	Succeeded by John Carroll
