= Shrewsbury Cathedral =

Catholic cathedral in Shrewsbury, Shropshire

Coordinates: 52.7053°N 2.7540°W

- Cathedral Church of Our Lady Help of Christians and Saint Peter of Alcantara
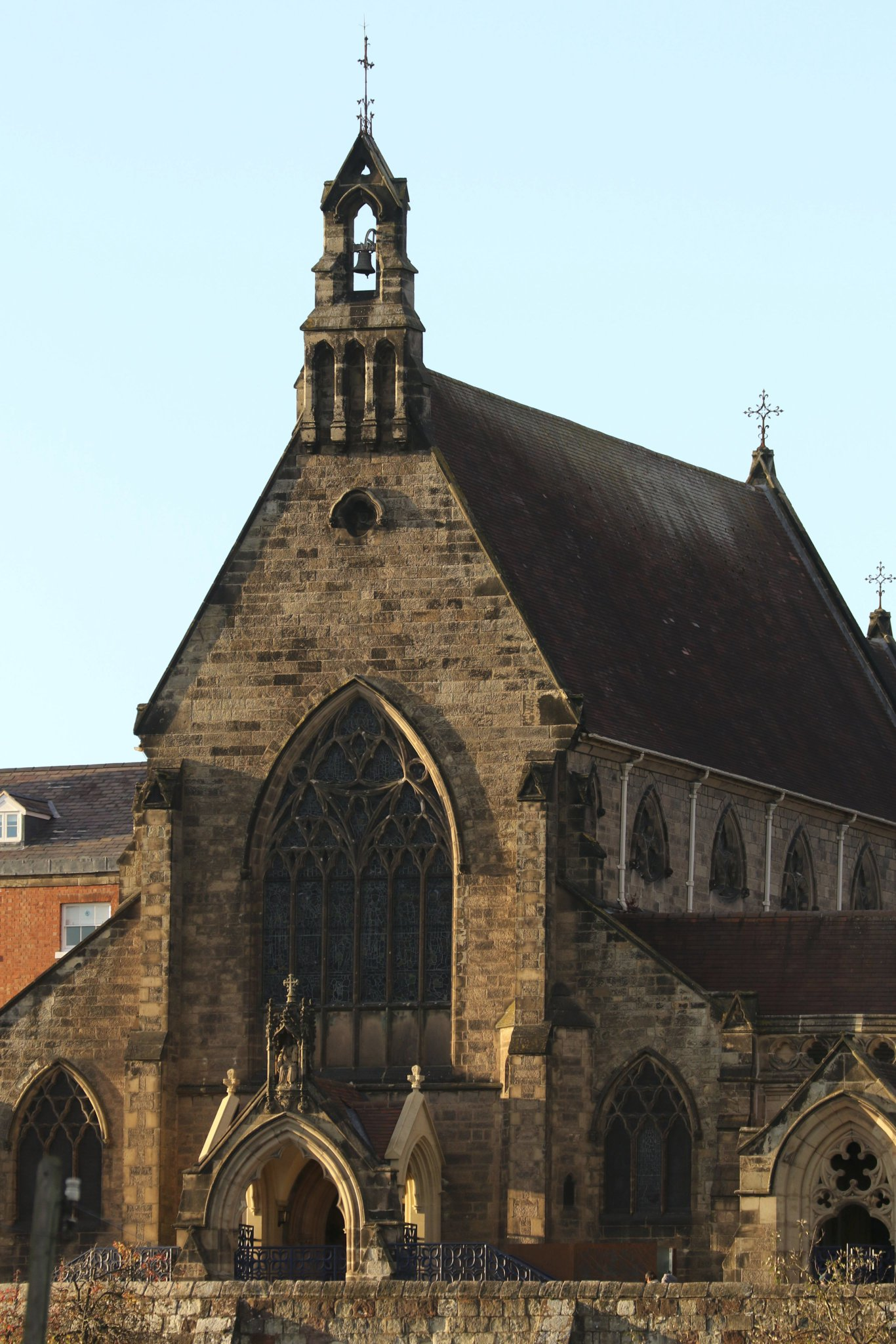

- Shown within Shropshire
- OS grid reference: SJ 49155 12228
- Location: Shrewsbury, Shropshire
- Country: England
- Denomination: Catholic Church
- Website: shrewsburycathedral.org

History
- Status: Cathedral
- Consecrated: 1856

Architecture
- Heritage designation: Grade II*
- Designated: 1953
- Architect: E. W. Pugin
- Style: Gothic Revival
- Groundbreaking: 1852
- Completed: 1856

Administration
- Province: Birmingham
- Diocese: Shrewsbury

Clergy
- Bishop: Rt Rev. Mark Davies
- Dean: Very Rev. Father Sean Henry

The Cathedral Church of Our Lady Help of Christians and Saint Peter of Alcantara, commonly known as Shrewsbury Cathedral, is a Roman Catholic cathedral in Shrewsbury, England. It is the seat of the Bishop of Shrewsbury and mother church of the Diocese of Shrewsbury, which covers the historic counties of Shropshire and Cheshire. It is classified by Historic England as Grade II* (particularly important buildings of more than special interest).

The cathedral is particularly notable as being the only cathedral in the county. Unlike most other English counties and county towns, neither Shropshire nor Shrewsbury has a Church of England cathedral.

== History ==
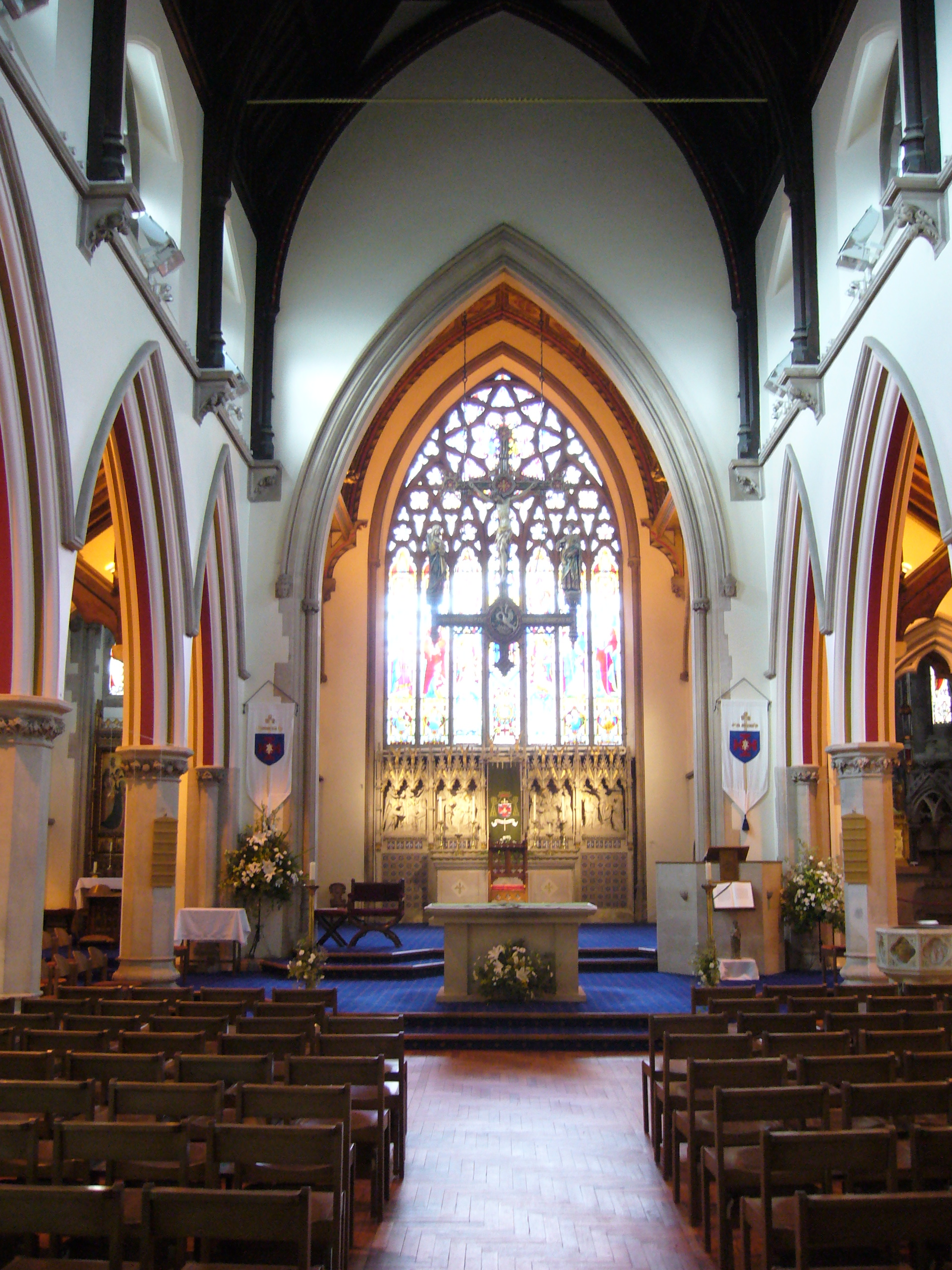
The interior of Shrewsbury Cathedral.

=== Construction ===
The building of the cathedral was originally commissioned by John Talbot, 16th Earl of Shrewsbury, the intended architect being Augustus Welby Northmore Pugin, but both men died in 1852 before the work was expected to start. The succeeding nephew, the 17th Earl, Bertram Talbot, offered to fund the building of the cathedral from which the new diocese of Shrewsbury would be based. The cathedral's design was taken over by Edward Pugin, the son of Augustus. Originally, a larger cathedral with a tall spire was planned. However, two years into the building of the cathedral, a stratum of sand was discovered very close to the building's foundations, resulting in weaker foundations that led to the scaling down of the cathedral's size and the abandonment of the spire. The Earl of Shrewsbury then agreed to meet the cost of a smaller church, finished at a cost of £4,000, though the Earl died three months prior to its completion. In 1856, the cathedral was completed and was opened by Cardinal Wiseman.

On 30 October 1956, a Mass was said in the cathedral to commemorate its centenary. The Mass was celebrated by Archbishop Francis Grimshaw of Birmingham, Bishop John Murphy of Shrewsbury, Bishop Cyril Restieaux of Plymouth, Bishop Edward Ellis of Nottingham, Bishop John Rudderham of Clifton and Bishop John Petit of Menevia.

=== Re-ordered ===
In 1984, the cathedral was re-ordered, bringing it in line with the revised liturgy of the Second Vatican Council. Local Grinshill stone was used for the new altar, which was consecrated in 1985 by Bishop Joseph Gray.

In 2019, it was decided by Bishop Mark Davies that the cathedral's interior would be restored to its original state. The resulting programme of conservation work in the cathedral found a series of 19th century wall paintings by Joseph Aloysius Pippet. The paintings had been hidden under two layers of paint from previous refurbishments in the 1970s and 1980s, described by Sophie Andreae, of the Catholic Bishops' Conference of England and Wales, as "unsympathetic". It is hoped that the paintings can be restored to their former glory.

The cathedral has a seating capacity of 300.

== Windows ==
The cathedral has a number of outstanding stained-glass windows. The older set of windows are mostly from the stained glass company Hardman & Co. from Birmingham. The cathedral also has seven windows made during the second and third decades of the 20th century by an artist inspired by the Arts and Crafts movement, Margaret Agnes Rope, the daughter of a local doctor; Rope had a studio in the Glass House in Fulham from 1911 to 1923. Later, Rope became a Carmelite nun at Woodbridge, Suffolk and later at Quidenham, Norfolk. She also designed and made a notable series of five large lancets at St Peter and Paul Church, Newport. Her cousin M. E. Aldrich Rope was also a stained-glass artist.

== War memorial ==
Rope also designed the cathedral's war memorial, in the west porch, dedicated to the 63 men of its congregation who died serving in World War I. It consists of a Pietà, with a wooden plaque below displaying the regimental badge of the King's Shropshire Light Infantry (the main county regiment), and the arms of Shropshire and Shrewsbury. The list of names is inscribed below the plaque, and at its foot is inscribed the opening line in Latin of the Requiem Mass. Nearby was placed a plaque to mark the 50th anniversary of the end of World War II in 1995.

== Location ==
The cathedral is on a street called Town Walls, adjacent to the historic town wall, within the main meander of the River Severn in the centre of Shrewsbury. It is surrounded by a mainly residential neighbourhood.

== Gallery ==
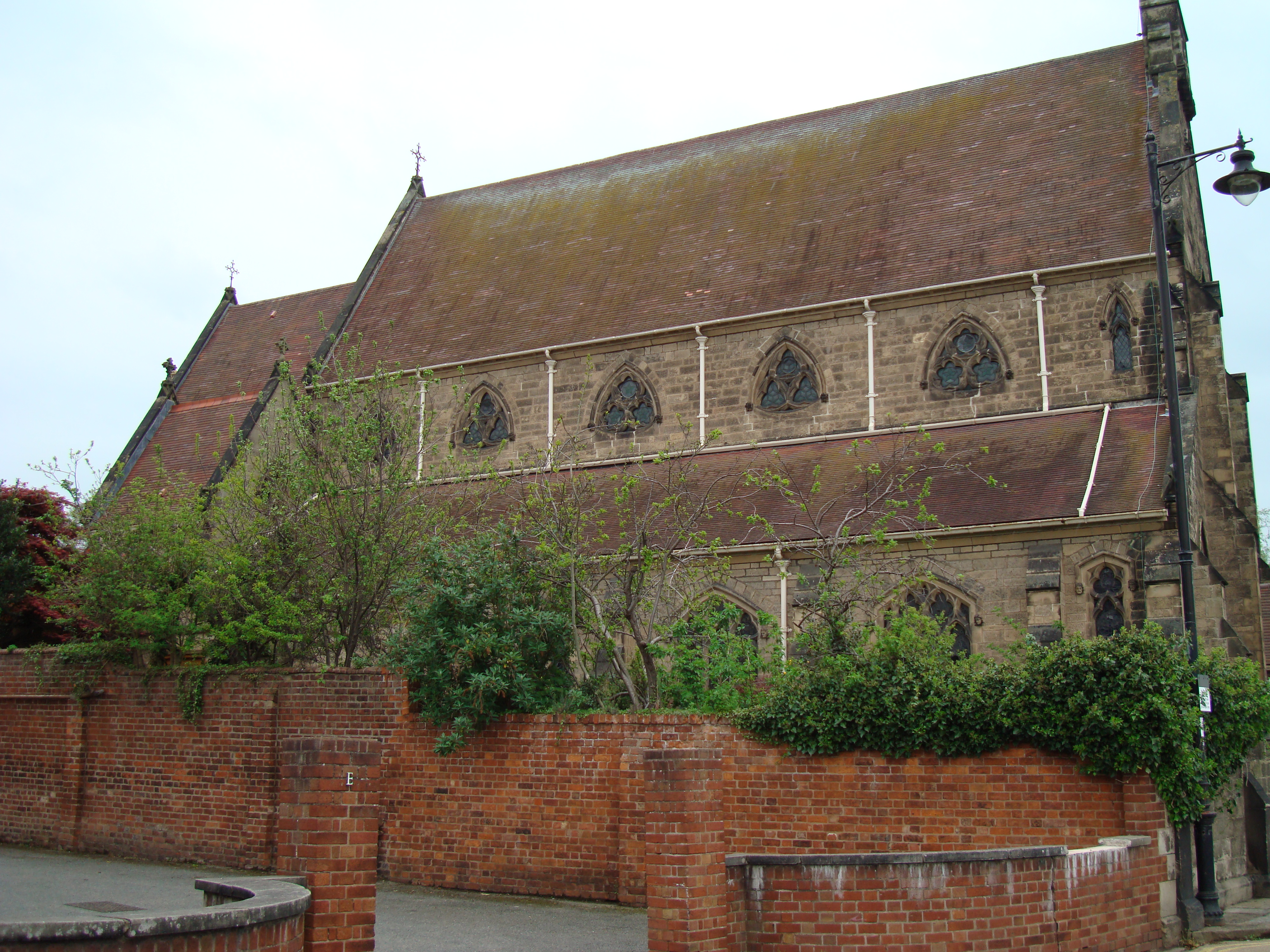
North side of the cathedral

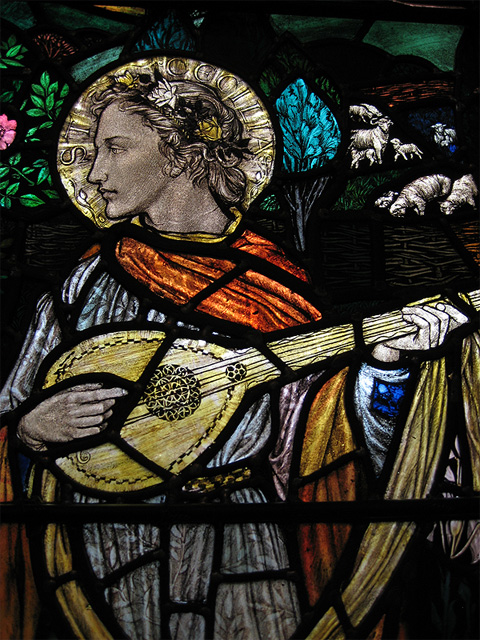
St Cecilia window

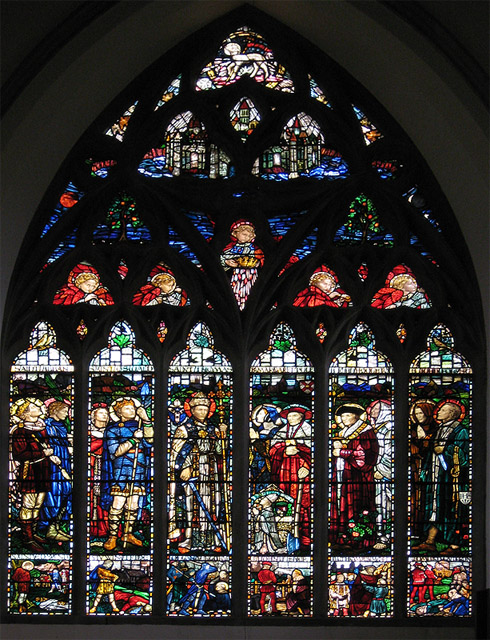
West window

== See also ==
- Listed buildings in Shrewsbury (southeast central area)
