= St Anne's RC Voluntary Academy =

Location
- Glenfield Road; Heaton Chapel; Stockport, SK4 2QP; England; 53.4220°N 2.1714°W

Information
- Type: Academy
- Motto: To know, love, and serve God
- Religious affiliation: Roman Catholic
- Established: 1959
- Local authority: Stockport Metropolitan Borough Council
- Trust: Emmaus Catholic Academy Trust
- Department for Education URN: 147942 Tables
- Ofsted: Reports
- Headteacher: Julie Sutcliffe
- Gender: Coeducational
- Age: 11 to 16
- Enrolment: 730
- Colours: Yellow, Blue and Purple
- Website: www.stannes.academy

St Anne's RC Voluntary Academy is a coeducational Roman Catholic secondary school located in Heaton Chapel, Stockport, England. It formally academised to join the Emmaus Catholic Multi-Academy Trust on 1 November 2020. In 2009, the school achieved arts (media) specialist school status. It is fed by St Winifred's RC Primary School in Heaton Mersey and St Joseph's Catholic Primary School in Reddish, and in turn feeds Aquinas College, Stockport.

== Academics ==
St Anne's operates a 3 year Key Stage 3, and a two year Key Stage 4. A choice is made between History and Geography in year 8, and the main GCSE options in year 9 for year 10 and 11.

=== Key Stage 4 ===
The core curriculum which all students follow is made up of the following GCSE subjects, English Language, English Literature, Mathematics, Religious Education and two Combined GCSE Science qualifications that cover Biology, Chemistry and Physics. Students have already selected one Humanity subject in Year 8, History or Geography, which takes up their first GCSE option and they now choose two further option subjects.

== Ofsted ==
Recent Office for Standards in Education, Children's Services and Skills (Ofsted) inspections who have included:

=== 2014 Ofsted Inspection ===
Ofsted rated the school as being inadequate in several areas, including leadership and management and quality of teaching, during a 2014 inspection. In the same academic year, school received negative reviews on Parent View, which is operated by Ofsted, and 68% of parents said they did not trust the management of the school. As a consequence, the school is inspected once every three months. A 2015 inspection, whilst accepting there was "a long way to go", showed the school was making reasonable progress towards the removal of special measures, and the school's action plan was now fit for purpose.

=== 2020 Ofsted Inspection ===
Six years later, the school was subjected to a full inspection. The inspectors said that: "The people who are responsible for this school have failed its pupils for far too long.Leaders have not ensured that the school is a safe and happy place in which pupils can flourish"

The school has gained the sobriquet 'The Forgotten School' and had ten head-teachers in eleven years. The current headteacher Dan Wright is in negotiations to join the Emmaus Trust, a potential Catholic multi-academy trust (CMAT) proposed for the southern part of the Roman Catholic Diocese of Salford.

== Notable alumni ==
- Mark Davies - 11th Roman Catholic Bishop of Shrewsbury.
- Sally Lindsay - Actor on Coronation Street.
- Dominic Monaghan - Actor
