= Jack Carroll =

Jack Carroll may refer to:

- Jack Carroll (comedian) (born 1998), British comedian
- Jack Carroll (footballer, born 1922) (1922–1999), Australian rules footballer for Collingwood
- Jack Carroll (footballer, born 2002), Australian rules footballer for St Kilda
- Jack Carroll (politician) (born 1942), Canadian politician
- Jack Carroll (rugby union) (1925–2018), Australian rugby union player
- Jack Carroll (hurler) (1921–1998), Irish hurler
- John M. Carroll (information scientist), known as Jack, information scientist
- Jack the Bulldog (John S. Carroll), official mascot of the Georgetown University Hoyas
- Jack Carroll (sprinter) (1930–1997), Canadian sprinter, competed at the 1952 Summer Olympics
- Tom Carroll (pole vaulter) (born 1928), pole vaulter also known as Jack Carroll, 1951 All-American for the Minnesota Golden Gophers track and field team
- Jack Carroll, author in the anthology Ring of Fire III

== See also ==
- John Carroll (disambiguation)
