= Johnny Carroll (disambiguation) =

Johnny Carroll (1937–1995) was an American rockabilly musician.

Johnny Carroll may also refer to:

- Johnny Carroll (trumpeter), Irish musician
- Johnny Carroll (association footballer) (1924–2001), Irish association footballer
- Johnny Carroll (Gaelic footballer) (born 1941), Irish Gaelic footballer

== See also ==
- John Carroll (disambiguation)
- Jonathan Carroll (disambiguation)
