= Joseph Gray (bishop) =

Irish-born Roman Catholic bishop

- Bishop of Shrewsbury
- Church: Catholic Church
- Diocese: Diocese of Shrewsbury
- In office: 19 August 1980 – 23 June 1995
- Predecessor: William Grasar
- Successor: Brian Noble
- Previous posts: Titular Bishop of Mercia (1968-1980); Auxiliary Bishop of Liverpool (1968-1980)

Orders
- Ordination: 20 June 1943 by Patrick Lyons
- Consecration: 16 February 1969 by George Beck

Personal details
- Born: 20 October 1919 Finternagh, County Cavan, Irish Republic
- Died: 7 May 1999 (aged 79) Wirral, Merseyside, United Kingdom

Styles of Joseph Gray
- Reference style: The Right Reverend
- Spoken style: My Lord
- Religious style: Bishop

Joseph Gray (20 October 1919 – 7 May 1999) was an Irish-born prelate of the Roman Catholic Church. He served as the Bishop of Shrewsbury from 1980 to 1995.

Born in Finternagh, County Cavan, Ireland on 20 October 1919, educated at St. Patrick's College, Cavan, he entered the seminary of St Mary's Oscott, Birmingham, he was ordained to the priesthood on 20 June 1943. He pursued further study in canon law at the Dunboyne Institute, Maynooth College, earning his licentiate in canon law in 1950, in 1959 he was invited to Rome, to study at the Pontifical University of St Thomas Aquinas, where he wrote a thesis for his doctorate in canon law.

He was appointed an auxiliary bishop of Liverpool and titular bishop of Mercia on 19 December 1968. His consecration to the episcopate took place on 16 February 1969, the principal consecrator was George Andrew Beck, Archbishop of Liverpool, and the principal co-consecrators were George Patrick Dwyer, Archbishop of Birmingham and Augustine Harris, Bishop of Middlesbrough. Eleven years later, he was appointed the Bishop of Shrewsbury on 19 August 1980.

He retired on 23 June 1995 and assumed the title Bishop emeritus of Shrewsbury. He died on 7 May 1999, aged 79.

Catholic Church titles
Preceded by William Eric Grasar	Bishop of Shrewsbury; 1980–1995	Succeeded by Brian Noble
