= Chester Catholic High School =

The Catholic High School, Chester

Location
- Old Wrexham Road; Handbridge; Chester, Cheshire, CH4 7HS; England; 53°10′44″N 2°53′31″W

Information
- Type: Academy
- Motto: Christo Fidelis (Faithful to Christ)
- Religious affiliation: Roman Catholic
- Established: September 1972
- Department for Education URN: 139343 Tables
- Ofsted: Reports
- Headteacher: C McKeagney
- Gender: Coeducational
- Age: 11 to 18
- Colours: Green & gold
- Website: http://www.christofidelis.org.uk

Chester Catholic High School or CHSC but officially called The Catholic High School, Chester is a co-educational Roman Catholic secondary school and sixth form with academy status, located on the outskirts of Handbridge, Chester, England.

The catchment area of the school expands into Lache and Blacon, with some buses transporting pupils from as far afield as Neston and Frodsham as well as a lot of pupils from Broughton, Flintshire and beyond. The school has over 1,000 pupils. The general uniform is a white shirt, bottle-green tie, a black blazer and black trousers or a tartan skirt. The current head teacher is Mrs C McKeagney; previous head teachers have included John McCann (acting, 2003–04), Victoria Ratchford (1994–2003), Christine McCann (no relation to John) and Michael Balfe.

The school transferred to the present site in September 1972; previously the school site was occupied by the Overleigh Boys School. In 2006 Ofsted called its Sixth Form "Outstanding". Building work was completed in Autumn 2008 and comprised a new building accommodating the Sixth Form and the Performing Arts, along with two new Science laboratories and new office and staffrooms.

The school has an Emmaus Building which was built especially for the sixth form is also used for whole school music and drama. It is solar power electricity generated, the water comes from rain water and the drama rooms have underfloor heating. It was officially opened on 12 February 2008 by Russell Cooke, Dean of Chester, standing in for Brian Noble, Roman Catholic Bishop of Shrewsbury.

In 2017, a new all-weather hockey pitch was opened by the Olympian Sam Quek.

The school was awarded specialist Science College status in 2003, in addition to being a classified Beacon school. In March 2013, the school converted to academy status.

Following consultation, the Governing Body of the Catholic High School decided upon a new school uniform in March 2014 coming into effect in September 2014.

== History ==
The Catholic High School, Chester was established in 1972 based on its two predecessor schools, The Ursuline Convent, based near the Roman amphitheatre in the middle of the city, and St Bede's Catholic School in Handbridge.

When the school was opened it took over the buildings of the old Overleigh Boys School, while Overleigh St Mary's Church of England Primary School was opened on the old St Bede's site. An external frieze of St Bede can be seen to this day at the front of the primary school. The Catholic High School opened with Michael Balfe as its first headteacher, and he was succeeded by Christine McCann and then Vicky Ratchford followed by John Murray. The current headteacher is Mrs C McKeagney, who was appointed in 2019.

The school was founded by and is part of the Catholic Church, and the relationship with the Diocese of Shrewsbury and our partner parishes is crucial to the school's identity.

== Alumni ==
- Julian Knight, Conservative MP for Solihull.
- Rebecca Long-Bailey, Labour MP for Salford (UK Parliament constituency), former Shadow Business Secretary and Shadow Education Secretary.
