= St Winefride Church =

St Winefride Church may refer to:

- St Winefride's Church, Holywell, Flintshire
- St Winefride's Church, Sandbach, Cheshire
- St Winefride Church, South Wimbledon, London
- Our Lady of Loreto and St Winefride's Church, Kew, London
- Our Lady Star of the Sea and St Winefride Church, Amlwch

== See also ==
- Saint Winifred
- St Winefride's Well
