= Jonathan Fielding (cricketer) =

English cricketer

Personal information
- Full name: Jonathan Mark Fielding
- Born: 13 March 1973 (age 53); Bury, Greater Manchester, England
- Batting: Right-handed
- Bowling: Slow left-arm orthodox

Domestic team information
- Years: Team
- 1997–1998: Minor Counties
- 1996–2006: Cumberland
- 1994: Lancashire

Career statistics
Competition	First-class	List A
Matches	1	17
Runs scored	27	110
Batting average	–	6.87
100s/50s	–/–	–/–
Top score	27*	26
Balls bowled	118	758
Wickets	2	16
Bowling average	26.50	37.18
5 wickets in innings	–	–
10 wickets in match	–	–
Best bowling	1/15	3/47
Catches/stumpings	–/–	5/–
- Source: Cricinfo, 29 March 2011

Jonathan Mark Fielding (born 13 March 1973) is an English cricketer. Fielding is a right-handed batsman who bowls slow left-arm orthodox. He was born in Bury, Lancashire.

Fielding played a single first-class match for Lancashire in the 1994 season against Cambridge University at Fenner's, Cambridge. In his only career first-class match, he scored an unbeaten 27 runs in Lancashire's second innings. With the ball he took 2 wickets, those of John Carroll in Cambridge's first-innings and John Ratledge in their second-innings. This was his only senior appearance for Lancashire.

In 1996, he made his Minor Counties Championship debut for Cumberland against Buckinghamshire. Fielding played Minor counties cricket for Cumberland from 1996 to 2006, including 28 Minor Counties Championship matches and 16 MCCA Knockout Trophy matches. During his time with Cumberland, Fielding played List A cricket, making his debut in that format against Middlesex in the 1996 NatWest Trophy. He represented Cumberland in eleven List A matches, with his final one coming against the Warwickshire Cricket Board in the 1st round of the 2002 Cheltenham & Gloucester Trophy which was played in 2001. He also played for the Minor Counties cricket team in the 1997 and 1998 Benson and Hedges Cup's, making six appearances. In total, Fielding played 11 List A matches, scoring 110 runs at a batting average of 6.87, with a best score of 26. With the ball he took 16 wickets at a bowling average of 37.18, with best figures of 3/47 against Cornwall in the 1999 NatWest Trophy.

Fielding played for the Lancashire Second XI, but also played for the Gloucestershire Second XI and the Derbyshire Second XI.
