= John Carrell (disambiguation) =

John Carrell may refer to:

- John Carrell (American football), American football player for the Houston Oilers, see 1965 NFL draft
- John Carrell, American ice dancer
- John Carrell, High Sheriff of Sussex and High Sheriff of Surrey

== See also ==
- John Carroll (disambiguation)
- John Caryll (disambiguation)
