= John Caryll =

John Caryll may refer to:

- John Caryll (MP) (c. 1505–66), Member of Parliament for Taunton, Sussex and Lancaster in 1553
- John Caryll (senior) (1625–1711), first Baron Caryll of Durford
- John Caryll the younger (1667–1736), second Baron Caryll of Durford
- John Baptist Caryll (1713–1788), third and last Baron Caryll of Durford

== See also ==
- John Carroll (disambiguation)
- John Carrell (disambiguation)
