= St Francis' Church, Chester =

Coordinates: 53.1877°N 2.8926°W

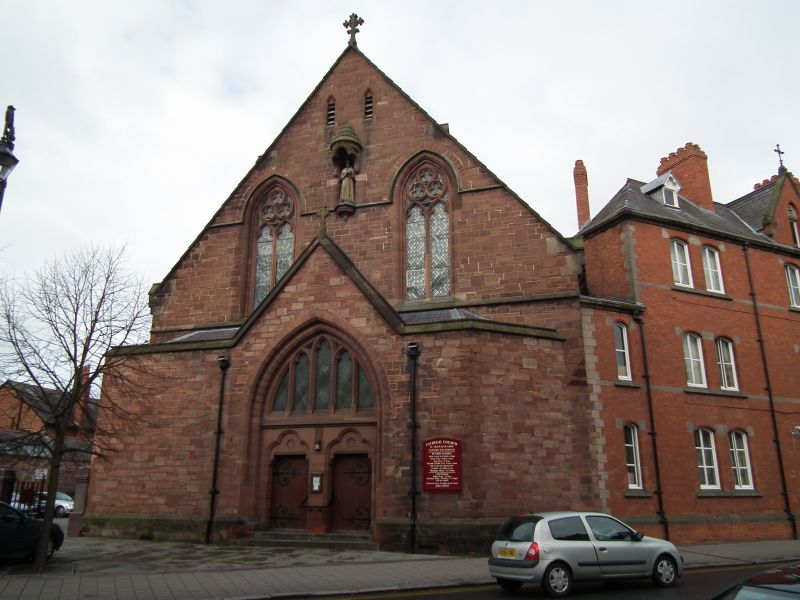
- Church entrance

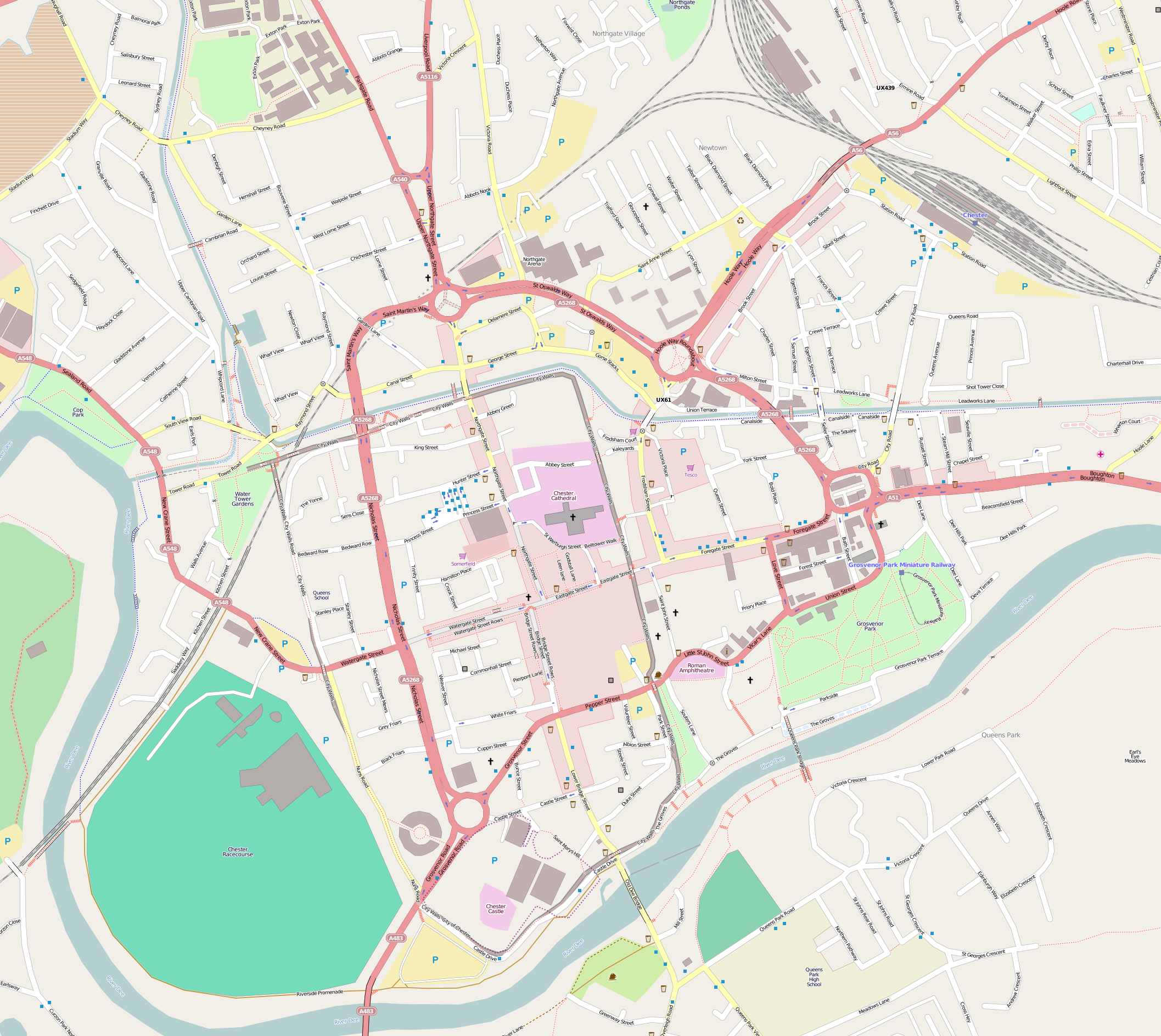
- Location in Chester
- OS grid reference: SJ 405 660
- Location: Grosvenor Street, Chester, Cheshire
- Country: England
- Denomination: Roman Catholic
- Website: StFrancisChester.co.uk/

History
- Status: Parish church
- Dedication: Saint Francis

Architecture
- Functional status: Active
- Heritage designation: Grade II
- Designated: 6 August 1998
- Architect(s): Benjamin Bucknell; James O'Byrne
- Architectural type: Church
- Groundbreaking: 1862
- Completed: 1875

Specifications
- Materials: Sandstone, slateroofs

Administration
- Diocese: Shrewsbury

St Francis' Church is in Grosvenor Street, Chester, Cheshire, England. It is an active Roman Catholic parish church in the diocese of Shrewsbury. The church is recorded in the National Heritage List for England as a designated Grade II listed building.

== History ==
Building of the church started in 1862 to a design by Benjamin Bucknell. After a number of problems and complications, it was completed between 1874 and 1875 by James O'Byrne. It was built for and is served by the Order of Friars Minor Capuchin.

== Architecture ==
The church is constructed in red sandstone, and has roofs of banded grey and purple slates. At the west end is a narthex porch, above which is a five-light window. Over this is a pair of two-light Geometric windows flanking a canopied niche containing a statue of Saint Francis. On the east and west gables are stone cross finials. It is a wide church without aisles. Its interior is plastered, and is lined to give the appearance of stone. There is a west gallery containing an organ. The walls are thick, and are hollowed out internally to form chapels and confessionals. The organ was built by Gray and Davison in 1893, with additions by the same firm during the following year. It was restored in about 1998 by Rod Billingsley.

== See also ==
- Grade II listed buildings in Chester (central)
