= Jonathan Carroll (disambiguation) =

Jonathan Carroll (born 1949) is an American fiction writer.

Jonathan Carroll may also refer to:

- Jonathan Carroll (politician), American politician

== See also ==
- Jonathan Carril (born 1984), Spanish footballer
- John Carroll (disambiguation)
- Johnny Carroll (disambiguation)
