= James Brown (bishop of Shrewsbury) =

English prelate

Styles of James Brown
- Reference style: The Right Reverend
- Spoken style: My Lord
- Religious style: Bishop

James Brown (11 January 1812 – 14 October 1881) was an English prelate of the Roman Catholic Church. He served as the first Bishop of Shrewsbury from 1851 to 1881.

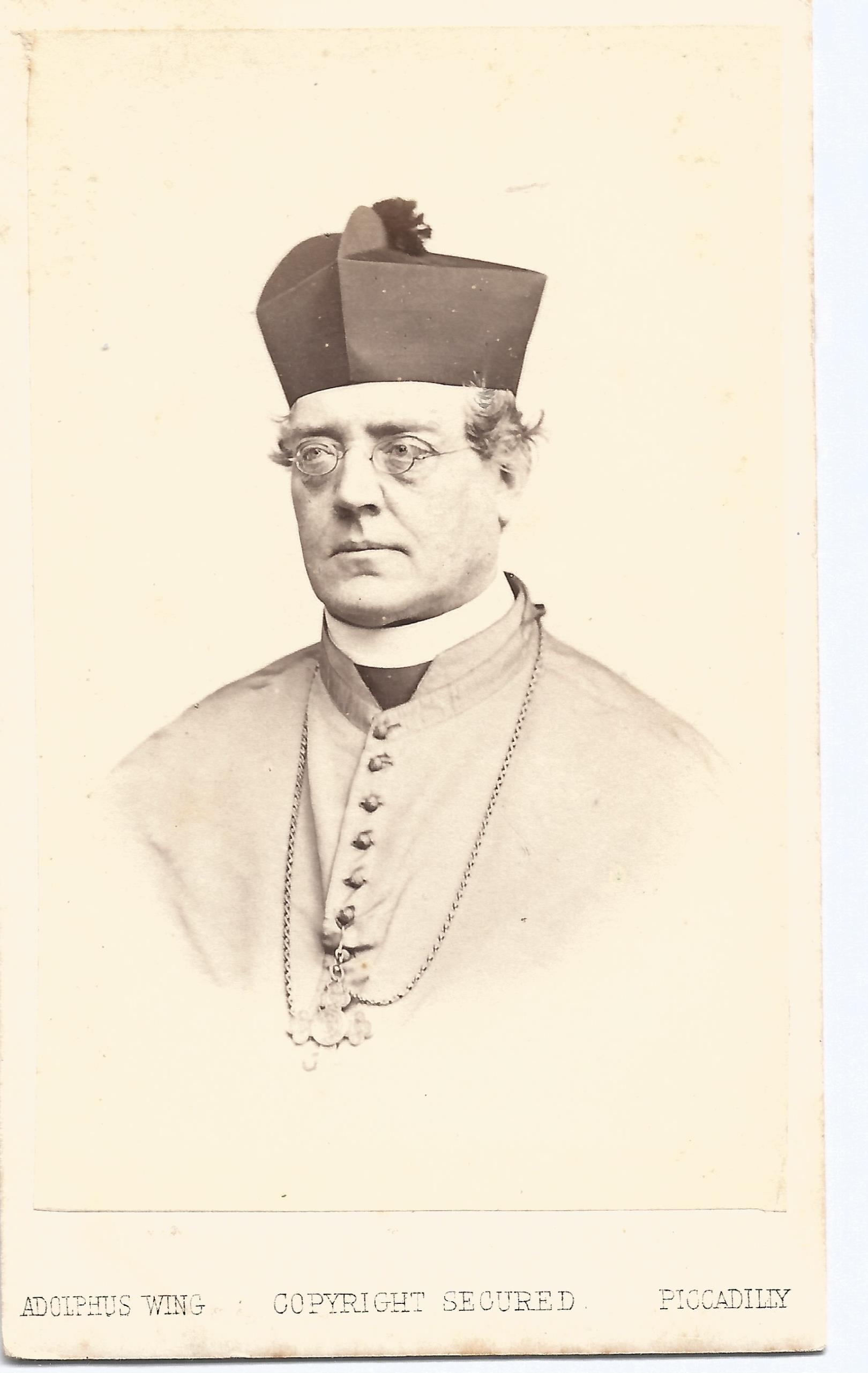
Bishop James Brown, carte de visite by Adolphus Wing c. 1860

== Life ==
He was born on 11 January 1812, at Wolverhampton. There, in the old chapel of SS. Peter and Paul in North Street, he often, when a child, served the mass of Bishop John Milner. That prelate, taking a great liking to the boy, and observing in his little acolyte the signs of a vocation to the ecclesiastical state, sent him, in 1820, to Sedgeley Park Academy. There he remained until June 1826, and in the following August was placed by Bishop Milner, as a clerical student, at St. Mary's College, Old Oscott, now known as Maryvale. He completed his studies as an Oscotian with marked success, being chiefly distinguished by his proficiency in classics.

On 18 February 1837, he was ordained priest by Bishop Walsh. For several years he remained at Old and at New Oscott as professor and prefect of studies until, in January 1844, he returned to Sedgeley Park as vice-president, being afterwards, before the year was out, promoted to the rank of president.

He was appointed the Bishop of the Diocese of Shrewsbury by the Holy See on 27 June 1851. His consecration to the Episcopate took place on 27 July 1851, the principal consecrator was Cardinal Nicholas Wiseman, Archbishop of Westminster, and the principal co-consecrators were Bishop William Wareing of Northampton and Bishop William Bernard Ullathorne of Birmingham.

Immediately after his consecration, Brown went to reside at Salter's Hall, near Newport, Shropshire. His diocese comprised within it not only Shropshire and Cheshire, but also the six counties of North Wales. Such was the energy of his episcopal governance during the thirty years that elapsed between 1861 and 1881, he had increased the number of priests there from thirty-three to ninety-five, of churches from thirty to eighty-eight, of monasteries from one to six, and of convents from one to eleven. And whereas in 1851, he had found not one poor school at all he left flourishing, near St. Asaph, the fine establishment of St. Beuno's College, and scattered all over his diocese sixty-three poor schools, at which 9,273 children were in daily attendance. Much of this wonderful increase was directly traceable to his untiring energy and his remarkable power of organisation. In September 1868, Brown left Newport and went to reside at Shrewsbury.

On 8 December 1869, he took part in the inauguration of the Œcumenical Council of the Vatican. On 17 April 1870, he was named by Pope Pius IX one of the bishops assistant at the pontifical throne. Some weeks before the declaration of the dogma of papal infallibility, on 18 July 1870, Brown was released from his attendance upon it on the score of ill-health, and received permission to return homewards.

On 27 July 1876, the silver jubilee of his episcopate was celebrated in the Shrewsbury Cathedral, memorial gifts to the value of £1,600 being presented to him on the occasion. His health breaking down three years afterwards he obtained the assistance of an auxiliary, Edmund Knight, who was consecrated on 25 July 1879. Brown then went to live at St. Mary's Grange, a sequestered spot near Shrewsbury, then recently purchased by him as the site of his proposed seminary. His active episcopal work had thenceforth to be abandoned. But to the close of his life he sedulously watched over the general administration of his diocese. Death came to him at last very gently, in his seventieth year, on 14 October 1881, at St. Mary's Grange. He had been present at four provincial councils (those of 1852, 1855, 1859, and 1873) held during the time of his episcopate. He presided at his own first diocesan synod in December 1853, at St. Alban's, Macclesfield.

He died in office at Grange Bank Farm, Shrewsbury, on 14 October 1881, aged 69 and his body taken to Wales where he was buried at Pantasaph Friary, Flintshire.

Catholic Church titles
New title	Bishop of Shrewsbury; 1851–1881	Succeeded by Edmund Knight
