= William Grasar =

William Eric Grasar
- Bishop of Shrewsbury
- Church: Catholic Church
- Diocese: Diocese of Shrewsbury
- In office: 26 April 1962 – 20 March 1980
- Predecessor: John Murphy
- Successor: Joseph Gray

Orders
- Ordination: 18 December 1937
- Consecration: 27 June 1962 by Francis Grimshaw

Personal details
- Born: 18 May 1913 Scunthorpe, Lincolnshire, United Kingdom of Great Britain and Ireland
- Died: 28 December 1982 (aged 69)

Styles of William Eric Grasar
- Reference style: The Right Reverend
- Spoken style: My Lord
- Religious style: Bishop

William Eric Grasar (18 May 1913 – 28 December 1982) was an English prelate of the Roman Catholic Church. He served as the bishop of Shrewsbury from 1962 to 1980.

== Priestly ministry ==
Born in Scunthorpe on 18 May 1913, he was ordained to the priesthood in the College Chapel of English College, Rome, on 18 December 1937 for service in the Roman Catholic Diocese of Nottingham.

n 1942 he took on the role of vice-rector of the English College, Rome, in Rome, which was then located in the Lake District due to the college community's evacuation from Rome during the Second World War. He stood down from the role after four years and then began studies for a doctorate in canon law.

He was appointed the bishop of Shrewsbury by the Holy See on 26 April 1962.

== Episcopal ministry ==
His consecration to the episcopate took place on 27 June 1962; the principal consecrator was Francis Joseph Grimshaw, Archbishop of Birmingham, and the principal co-consecrators were John Aloysius Murphy, Archbishop of Cardiff, and Edward Ellis, Bishop of Nottingham. His episcopal motto was 'Servus Tuus Ego'

He participated in all the four sessions of the Second Vatican Council, held between in 1962 and 1965.

He resigned on 20 March 1980 and assumed the title Bishop emeritus of Shrewsbury. He died on 28 December 1982, aged 69.

Catholic Church titles
Preceded by John Aloysius Murphy	Bishop of Shrewsbury; 1962–1980	Succeeded by Joseph Gray
