= Killinkere =

Parish in County Cavan, Ireland

Killinkere Irish: Cillín Chéir
- Location of Killinkere within the Republic of Ireland
- Coordinates: 53°53′13″N 7°3′52″W
- Country: Ireland
- Province: Ulster
- County: County Cavan
- Irish grid reference: N615934

Killinkere (Irish: Cillín Chéir, meaning 'Little Black Church') is a civil and ecclesiastical parish of County Cavan, Ireland. It is located between the towns of Virginia and Bailieborough.

== Civil parish ==
Killinkere gave its name to an Irish civil parish and was located mainly in the barony of Castlerahan, but partly in the barony of Upper Loughtee, all in County Cavan in the Province of Ulster. The Civil Parish of Killinkere was used for local taxation and was shown on the nineteenth century Ordnance Survey of Ireland maps. For poor law purposes the Civil Parish was replaced by district electoral divisions in the mid-nineteenth century. According to the 1851 census the Civil Parish had a total of 49 townlands.

== Ecclesiastical parishes ==
=== Church of Ireland parish ===
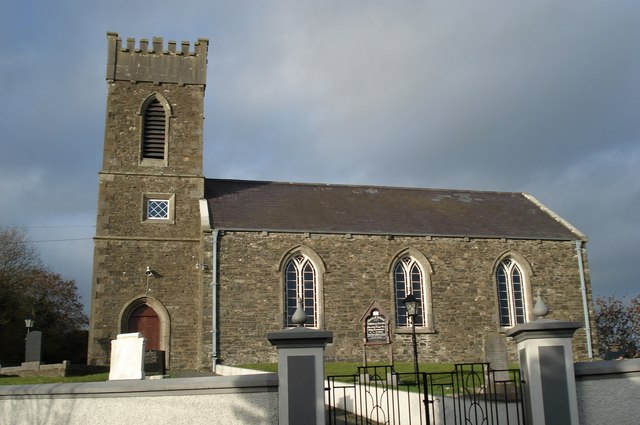
Killinkere Parish Church, Killinkere.

Killinkere Parish Church, Beagh Glebe, Killinkere, was built in 1817. It is the oldest of the churches in the Virginia Group of Parishes in the Church of Ireland Diocese of Kilmore, Elphin and Ardagh. The other churches in the group are Lurgan Parish Church in Virginia (built 1821), Munterconnaught Parish Church (built 1831), and Billis Church (built 1844). The four churches were amalgamated under one incumbency in 1972.

=== Roman Catholic parish ===
The Roman Catholic Parish of Killinkere has two places of worship. They are two of a number churches in the Roman Catholic Diocese of Kilmore.

St Ultan's Church, Corratinner, Killinkere, has the oldest history. The original church was in the townland of Gallon, about 1 kilometre (0.6 mi) from the present church, and was part of a monastic settlement, dating from the 14th to the 16th century. The site was abandoned sometime between 1590 and 1641. During the penal times, Killinkere had no Roman Catholic place of worship. In 1790, a mud-thatched hut was erected in Killinkere, and in 1829 work on the present church began, which was completed by Christmas Day 1829. There have been a number of notable renovations in the interior during the 1920s, the 1960s and the 1990s.

St Mary's Church, Clanaphilip, Termon, Killinkere, was shown as a ruin on a map in 1690. It was replaced a number of times, first as a mud wall church at Termon Cross in 1785, then a thatched building in 1810, and a barn-type church in 1870. Work on the present church began in 1973 and was blessed and opened in 1974. It incorporates the bell, baptismal font, the 1810 date-stone and the altar bell from the earlier buildings. The church was re-roofed and extensively renovated in 1992.

== Townlands ==
The parish of Killinkere has a total of 15,938 acres (64.50 km^{2}; 24.90 sq mi) and made up of the following 49 townlands:

- Assan, 138 acres (0.56 km^{2}; 0.22 sq mi)
- Beagh Glebe, 654 acres (2.65 km^{2}; 1.02 sq mi)
- Billis, 288 acres (1.17 km^{2}; 0.45 sq mi)
- Burnew, 179 acres (0.72 km^{2}; 0.28 sq mi)
- Cargagh, 286 acres (1.16 km^{2}; 0.45 sq mi)
- Carnagarve, 618 acres (2.50 km^{2}; 0.97 sq mi)
- Carnalynch, 468 acres (1.89 km^{2}; 0.73 sq mi)
- Carrickeeshill, 298 acres (1.21 km^{2}; 0.47 sq mi)
- Carrickgorman, 343 acres (1.39 km^{2}; 0.54 sq mi)
- Carricknamaddoo, 624 acres (2.53 km^{2}; 0.98 sq mi)
- Carricknaveagh, 337 acres (1.36 km^{2}; 0.53 sq mi)
- Cleffin, 378 acres (1.53 km^{2}; 0.59 sq mi)
- Coolnacola, 221 acres (0.89 km^{2}; 0.35 sq mi)
- Corradooa, 123 acres (0.50 km^{2}; 0.19 sq mi)
- Corraneden, 174 acres (0.70 km^{2}; 0.27 sq mi)
- Corratinner, 334 acres (1.35 km^{2}; 0.52 sq mi)
- Derryhum, 430 acres (1.74 km^{2}; 0.67 sq mi)
- Drumagolan, 518 acres (2.10 km^{2}; 0.81 sq mi)
- Drumederglass, 96 acres (0.39 km^{2}; 0.15 sq mi)
- Drumfomina, 267 acres (1.08 km^{2}; 0.42 sq mi)
- Drummallaght, 737 acres (2.98 km^{2}; 1.15 sq mi)
- Drutamy, 217 acres (0.88 km^{2}; 0.34 sq mi)
- Fartadreen, 244 acres (0.99 km^{2}; 0.38 sq mi)
- Finternagh, 295 acres (1.19 km^{2}; 0.46 sq mi)
- Gallon, 193 acres (0.78 km^{2}; 0.30 sq mi)
- Galloncurra, 107 acres (0.43 km^{2}; 0.17 sq mi)
- Gola, 271 acres (1.10 km^{2}; 0.42 sq mi)
- Greaghadoo, 183 acres (0.74 km^{2}; 0.29 sq mi)
- Greaghadossan, 556 acres (2.25 km^{2}; 0.87 sq mi)
- Greaghclaugh, 221 acres (0.89 km^{2}; 0.35 sq mi)
- Greaghduff, 140 acres (0.57 km^{2}; 0.22 sq mi)
- Greaghnacunnia, 203 acres (0.82 km^{2}; 0.32 sq mi)
- Greaghnafarna, 530 acres (2.14 km^{2}; 0.83 sq mi)
- Invyarroge, 216 acres (0.87 km^{2}; 0.34 sq mi)
- Killyduff, 201 acres (0.81 km^{2}; 0.31 sq mi)
- Kilmore, 333 acres (1.35 km^{2}; 0.52 sq mi)
- Lateaster, 122 acres (0.49 km^{2}; 0.19 sq mi)
- Lismagiril, 377 acres (1.53 km^{2}; 0.59 sq mi)
- Lisnabantry, 233 acres (0.94 km^{2}; 0.36 sq mi)
- Lissacapple, 186 acres (0.75 km^{2}; 0.29 sq mi)
- Lissanymore, 760 acres (3.08 km^{2}; 1.19 sq mi)
- Lurgananure, 326 acres (1.32 km^{2}; 0.51 sq mi)
- Lurganaveele, 221 acres (0.89 km^{2}; 0.35 sq mi)
- Moylett, 561 acres (2.27 km^{2}; 0.88 sq mi)
- Pottleduff, 51 acres (0.21 km^{2}; 0.08 sq mi)
- Stramaquerty, 180 acres (0.73 km^{2}; 0.28 sq mi)
- Termon, 755 acres (3.06 km^{2}; 1.18 sq mi)
- Tievenaman, 446 acres (1.80 km^{2}; 0.70 sq mi)
- Togher, 299 acres (1.21 km^{2}; 0.47 sq mi)

== Notes ==
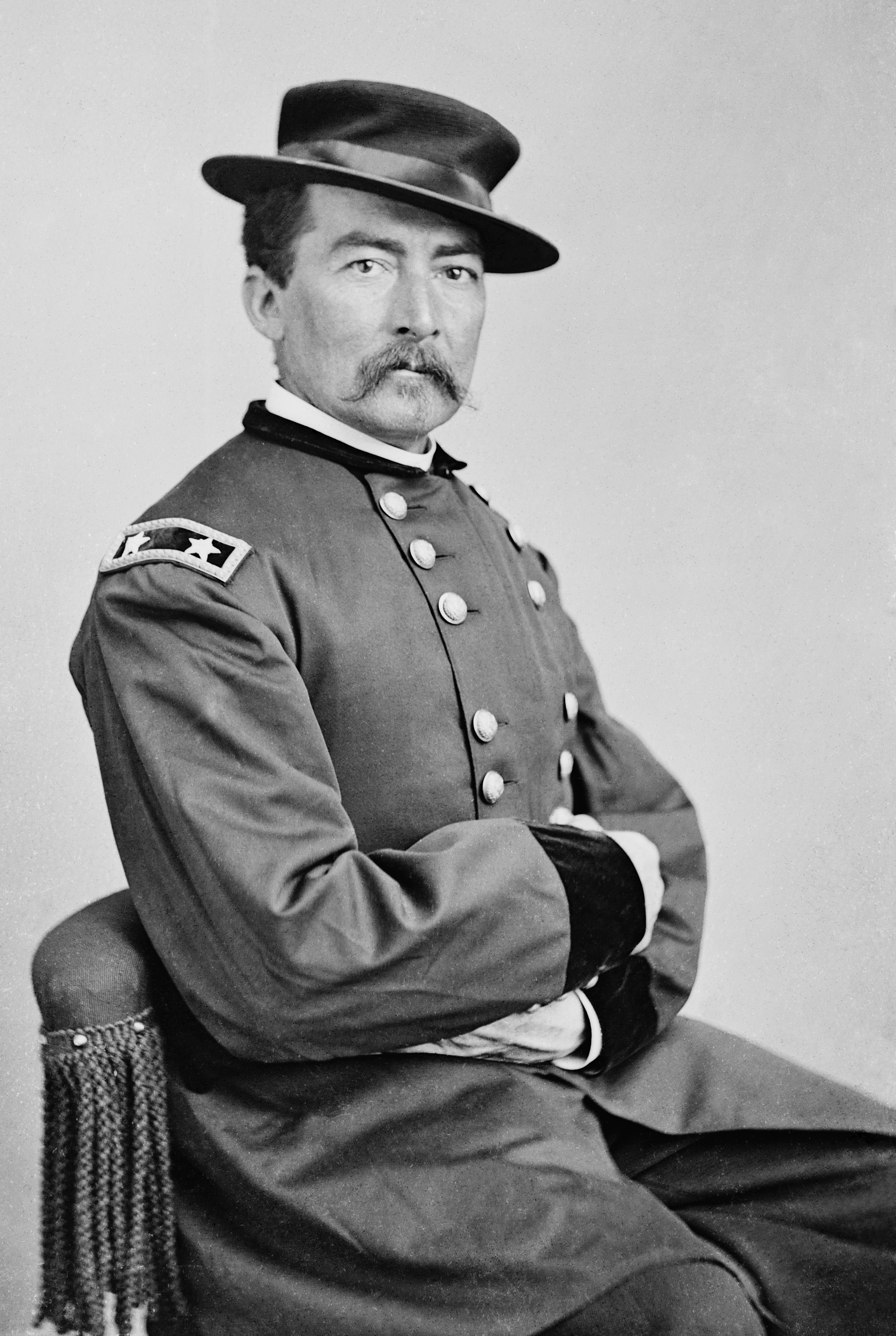
Sheridan portrait by Mathew Brady or Levin C. Handy

The parents of US Civil War general Philip Sheridan came from Killinkere.
