= Thomas Brice (martyrologist) =

English clergyman (1536–1571)

Thomas Brice (1536–1571) was a Church of England clergyman, martyrologist and poet in the later 16th century.

== Life ==
Brice was engaged early in Queen Mary's reign in bringing Protestant books from Wesel into Kent and London. He was watched and dogged by the government, but escaped several times. On 25 April 1560, he was ordained deacon, and on the following 4 June priest, by Edmund Grindal, then later Bishop of London. He became curate at Ramsden Bellhouse in Essex.

== Works ==
He was the author of A Compendious Regester of 1559. The dedication is addressed to William Parr, 1st Marquess of Northampton. The Register of Martyrs extends from 4 February 1555 to 17 November 1558, and consists of seventy-seven six-line doggerel stanzas. John Foxe found the Register of use in the compilation of his Acts and Monuments. A religious poem entitled The Wishes of the Wise, in twenty verses of four lines each, concludes the work. The original edition was printed by Richard Adams, who was fined by the Stationers' Company for producing it without licence. Another surreptitious edition appears to have been issued about the same time, but no copy has survived. A second edition was "newly imprinted at the earnest request of divers godly and well-disposed citizens" in 1597. Several extracts from the book appear in the Parker Society's Devotional Poetry of the Reign of Elizabeth (161, 175), and the whole work was reprinted in Edward Arber's Garner.

Two other books are attributed to Brice in the Stationers' Registers, but nothing is now known of either of them. The first is The Courte of Venus moralized, which Hugh Singleton received licence to print about July 1567; the second is Songs and Sonnettes, licensed to Henry Bynneman in 1568. In 1570, John Allde had licence to print An Epitaphe on Mr. Brice, who may very probably be identified with the author of the Register.
