= John Carroll (bishop of Shrewsbury) =

Styles of John Carroll
- Reference style: The Right Reverend
- Spoken style: My Lord
- Religious style: Bishop

John Carroll (16 March 1838 – 14 January 1897) was an Irish-born prelate of the Roman Catholic Church. He served as the Bishop of Shrewsbury from 1895 to 1897.

Born in Castleblaney, County Monaghan on 16 March 1838, his family moved to Liverpool in England. He was educated in the Catholic Middle School, and studied for the priesthood at Ushaw and Bruges he was ordained to the priesthood on 22 December 1861. He was appointed Coadjutor Bishop of Shrewsbury and Titular Bishop of Acmonia on 22 August 1893. His consecration to the Episcopate took place on 28 October 1893, the principal consecrator was Cardinal Herbert Vaughan, Archbishop of Westminster, and the principal co-consecrators were William Gordon, Bishop of Leeds, and John Bilsborrow, Bishop of Salford. On the death of Edmund Knight, he automatically succeeded as the Bishop of Shrewsbury on 11 May 1895.

He died in office at Bishop's House, Oxton, Birkenhead, Cheshire on 14 January 1897 at the age of 58, and was buried in Dukinfield Cemetery near Manchester.

Catholic Church titles
Preceded by Edmund Knight	Bishop of Shrewsbury; 1895–1897	Succeeded by Samuel Webster Allen
