= St Peter and Paul Church, Newport =

Catholic Church in England

Coordinates: 52.7699°N 2.3835°W

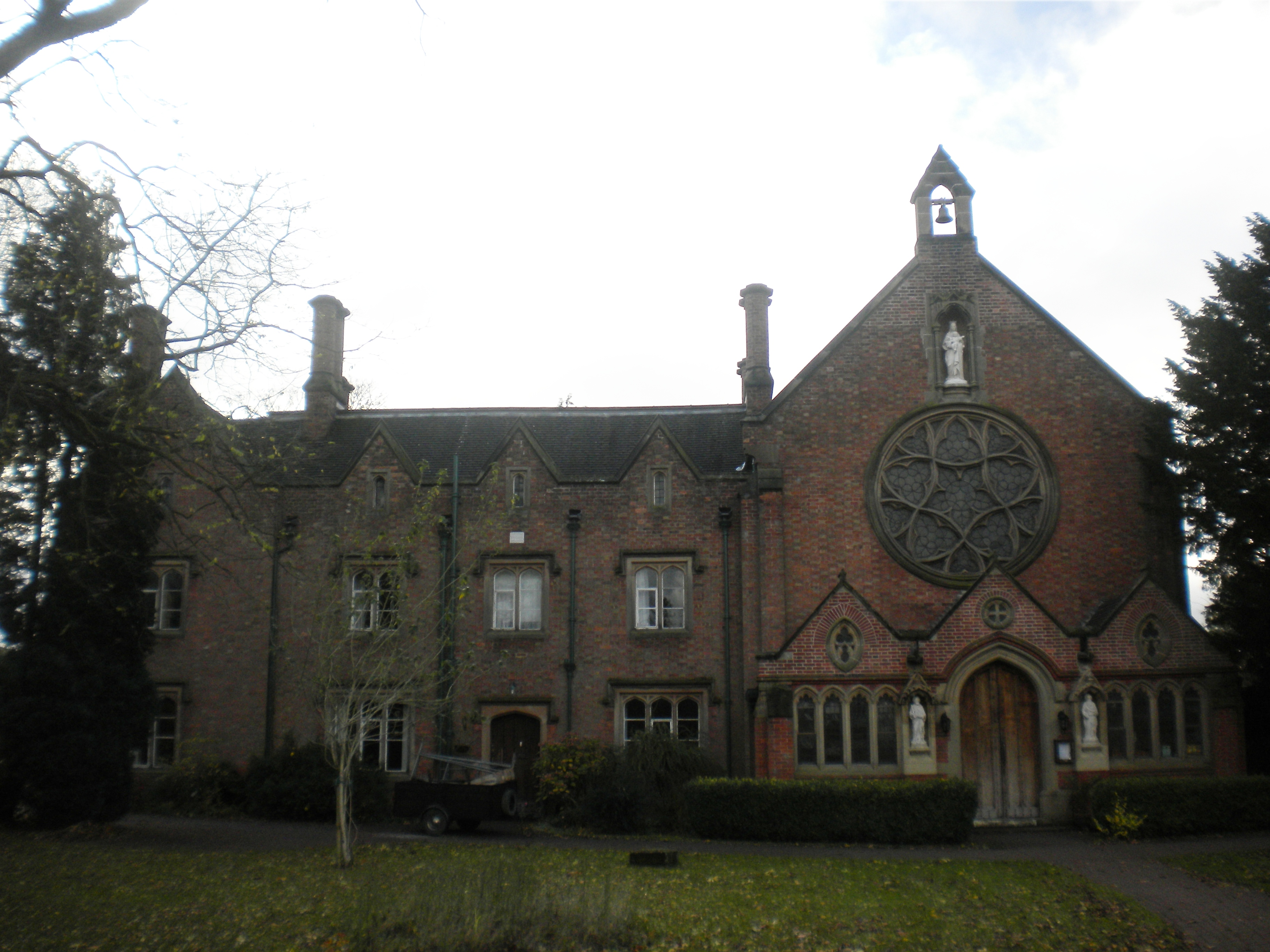

St. Peter and St. Paul Roman Catholic Church is a parish of the Roman Catholic Church in Newport, Shropshire, England. The parish covers Newport and the surrounding villages as far as Hinstock.

Salters Hall, in Salters Lane, Newport, is attached to the church. It was designed by Augustus Pugin and built in 1852.

== History ==
Sts. Peter and Paul's is the oldest Catholic parish in Shropshire. It became a parish in 1650 when it was connected with the Catholic Talbot family at Longford Hall. When Longford Hall was sold in 1789, the priest was provided with another residence by the Earl of Shrewsbury—Salters Hall, named after Judge Salter, who was high sheriff of Shropshire.

It was the home of the first Bishop of Shrewsbury, James Brown, from 1851 to 1868. The church was built onto the house in 1832, although not consecrated until 1906, and the old house was absorbed into the present large building.

The church contains a series of five large twentieth-century stained-glass windows designed and made by Margaret Rope, depicting Saints Peter and Paul, Winefride and Nicholas, and Our Lady Help of Christians.

In a garden outside the east end is the church war memorial, consisting of a stone figure of Christ on a wooden crucifix with the stigmata indicated in red paint, to members of its congregation who died in World War I.

== Gallery ==
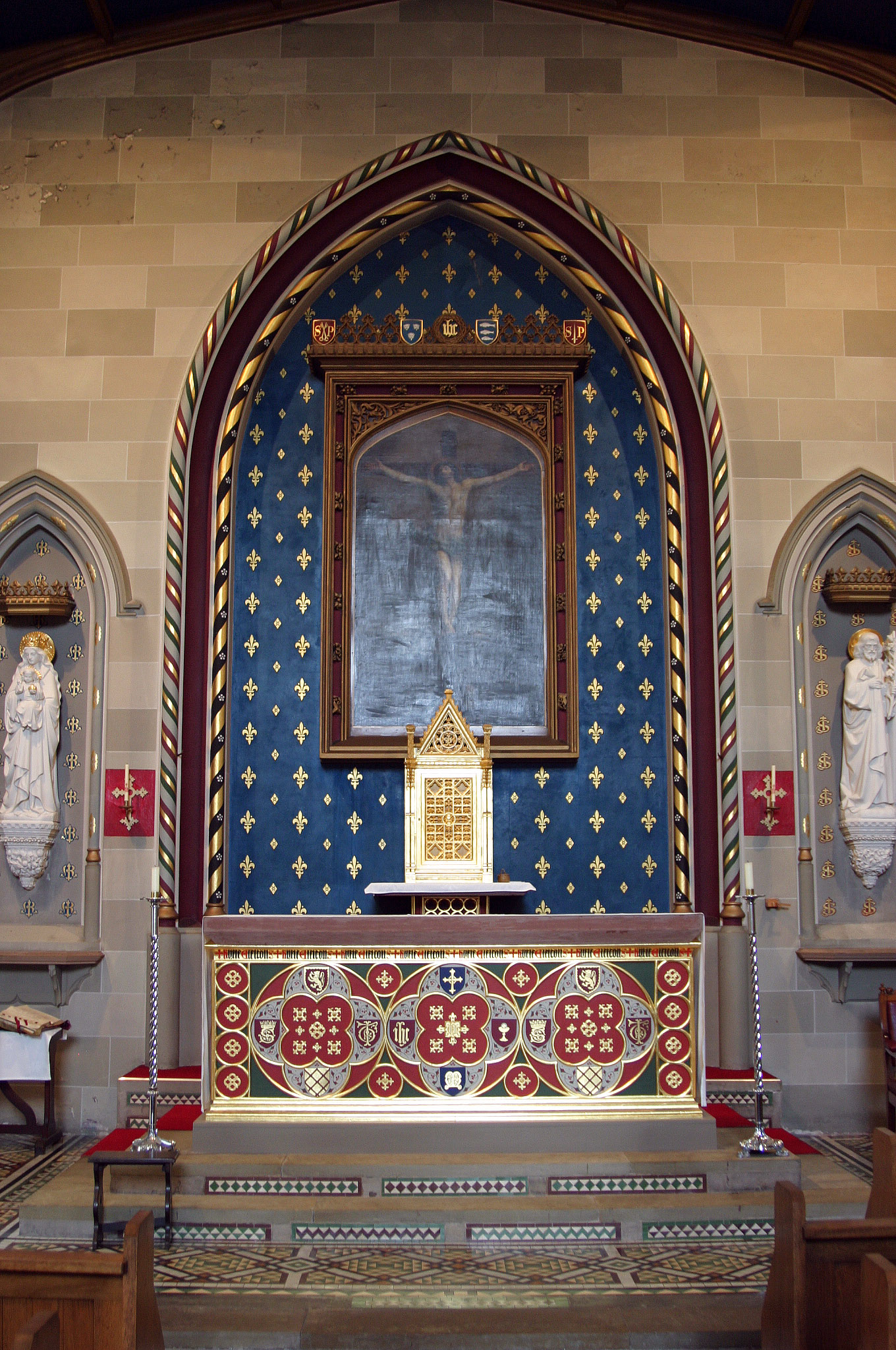
Inside SS Peter and Paul Church

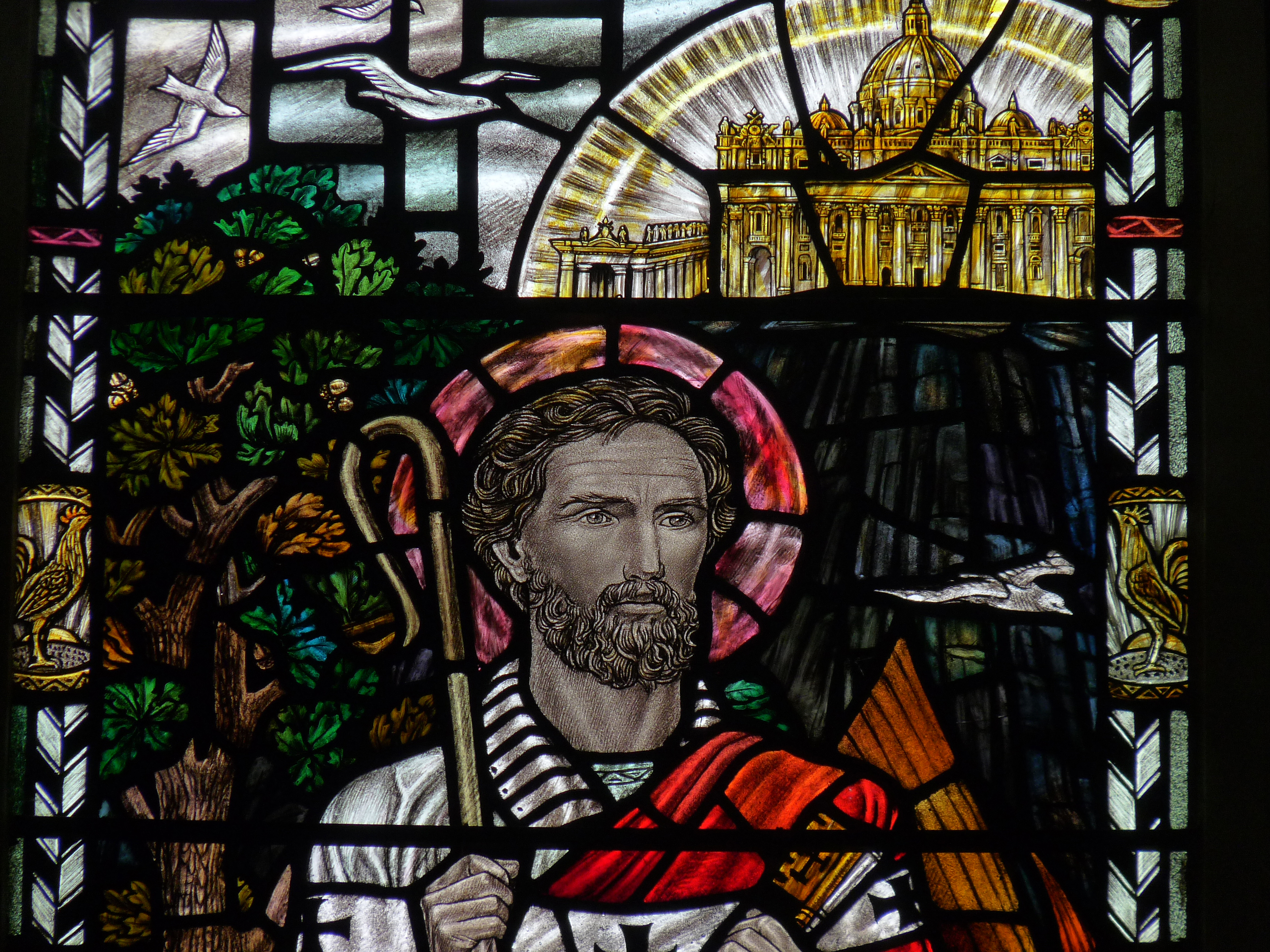
Detail of the Saint Peter window at SS Peter & Paul, Newport, Shropshire, by Margaret Rope

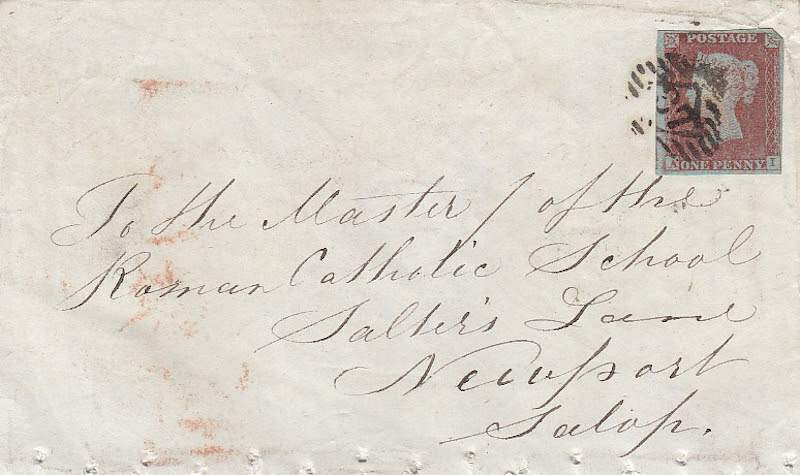
Envelope from London addressed to Bishop Brown 1853

== See also ==
- Listed buildings in Newport, Shropshire
