= Jean Carroll (disambiguation) =

Jean Carroll may refer to:

- Jean Carroll (woman; 1911–2010; born Celine Zeigman), U.S. actress and comedienne
- E. Jean Carroll (woman; born 1943), U.S. journalist
- Jean Carroll (cricketer) (woman; born 1980), Irish cricketer
- Kent Jean Carroll (man; 1926–2019), U.S. Navy vice admiral
- Jean-Marie "JC" Carroll (man; born 1956), British musician

== See also ==
- Jean Carol (fl. 1980s–2020s), U.S. actress
- Jean Cayrol (man; 1911–2005), French poet and publisher
- Joan Carroll (1931–2016; born Joan Marie Felt) U.S. actress
- Joan Carroll (soprano) (born 1932), U.S. opera soprano
- John Carroll (disambiguation)
- Carroll (disambiguation)
- Jean (disambiguation)
