= John Murphy (archbishop of Cardiff) =

Catholic archbishop

The Most Reverend John Murphy
- Archbishop of Cardiff
- Church: Roman Catholic
- Archdiocese: Cardiff
- Appointed: 22 August 1961
- In office: 1961–1983
- Predecessor: Michael McGrath
- Successor: John Ward
- Previous posts: Coadjutor Bishop of Shrewsbury (1948–1949); Bishop of Shrewsbury (1949–1961)

Orders
- Ordination: 21 March 1931
- Consecration: 25 February 1948 by William Godfrey
- Rank: Metropolitan Archbishop

Personal details
- Born: 21 December 1905 Birkenhead, England
- Died: 18 November 1995 (aged 89)

Styles of John Aloysius Murphy
- Reference style: The Most Reverend
- Spoken style: Your Grace
- Religious style: Archbishop

John Aloysius Murphy (21 December 1905 – 18 November 1995) was a Roman Catholic Church prelate who served firstly as the Bishop of Shrewsbury from 1949 to 1961, then as the Archbishop of Cardiff from 1961 to 1983.

He was born in Birkenhead on the Wirral Peninsula on 21 December 1905, and ordained a priest for the Diocese of Shrewsbury on 21 March 1931. He was appointed Coadjutor Bishop of Shrewsbury and Titular Bishop of Appia on 7 February 1948. His consecration to the Episcopate took place on 25 February 1948, the principal consecrator was Cardinal William Godfrey, Archbishop of Westminster, and the principal co-consecrators were John Edward Petit, Bishop of Menevia and Henry Vincent Marshall, Bishop of Salford. On the death of Ambrose James Moriarty on 3 June 1949, Murphy automatically succeeded as Bishop of Shrewsbury. Twelve years later, he was appointed Archbishop of Cardiff.

Murphy adjusted to the ecumenical climate of Vatican II, for example by accompanying the Abbot of Caldey on a visit to the Llandaff residence of Bishop Glyn Simon, who subsequently as Archbishop of Wales spoke at the Installation (1969) of the Catholic Lord Mayor, Sir Lincoln Hallinan,

He retired on 25 March 1983 and assumed the title Archbishop emeritus of Cardiff. He died on 18 November 1995, aged 89.

Catholic Church titles
Preceded by Ambrose James Moriarty	Bishop of Shrewsbury; 1949–1961	Succeeded by William Eric Grasar
Preceded by Michael Joseph McGrath	Archbishop of Cardiff; 1961–1983	Succeeded by John Aloysius Ward
