= Brian Noble (bishop) =

English prelate (1936–2019)

The Right Reverend Brian Noble
- Roman Catholic Bishop of Shrewsbury
- Church: Roman Catholic Church
- Province: Birmingham
- Diocese: Shrewsbury
- Appointed: 23 June 1995
- Installed: 30 August 1995
- Term ended: 1 October 2010
- Predecessor: Joseph Gray
- Successor: Mark Davies
- Previous post: Priest of the Diocese of Lancaster

Orders
- Ordination: 11 June 1960 (Priest)
- Consecration: 30 August 1995 (Bishop) by Maurice Couve de Murville

Personal details
- Born: Brian Michael Noble; 11 April 1936 Lancaster, Lancashire, England
- Died: 21 October 2019 (aged 83) The Wirral, Merseyside, England
- Denomination: Roman Catholic
- Motto: Adveniat regnum tuum (Thy Kingdom come)

Brian Michael Noble (11 April 1936 – 21 October 2019) was an English prelate who served in the Roman Catholic Church as the Bishop of Shrewsbury from 1995 to 2010.

== Biography ==
Born in Lancaster, Lancashire, England, Brian Michael Noble studied for the priesthood at Ushaw College and was ordained to the priesthood on 11 May 1960.

He was first appointed assistant priest at St Ignatius’ Church in Preston between 1960 and 1968 after which he served at Our Lady and St Patrick's, Maryport, Cumbria, between 1968 and 1972. From 1972 to 1980 he served as chaplain at University of Lancaster and priest-in-charge of St Joseph's in Galgate.

In 1980 he took up an appointment on the staff of the Pontificio Collegio Beda Beda College in Rome, where he taught Pastoral Studies and Liturgy. On his return from Rome in 1987, he took up an appointment as Parish Priest at St Benedict's Parish in Whitehaven, Cumbria. and served as a priest in the Diocese of Lancaster.

== Episcopal ministry ==
On 23 June 1995, he was appointed Roman Catholic Bishop of Shrewsbury and ordained bishop on 30 August 1995, Maurice Couve de Murville, Archbishop of Birmingham serving as the Principal Consecrator, with Patrick Kelly, Bishop of Salford (later Archbishop of Liverpool) and John Brewer, Roman Catholic Bishop of Lancaster serving as the Principal Co-Consecrators.

Noble retired as Bishop of Shrewsbury on 1 October 2010 and was succeeded by Mark Davies. He served as an Episcopal Member of the Department for Christian Life and Worship within the Catholic Bishops' Conference of England and Wales.

Noble died on 21 October 2019, at the age of 83.
