= Jack Carroll (footballer, born 1922) =

Australian rules footballer

John William Carroll

Personal information
- Full name: John William Carroll
- Born: 15 January 1922; Walpeup, Victoria
- Died: 17 September 1999 (aged 77); Sale, Victoria
- Original team: Walpeup / St Pat's
- Height: 180 cm (5 ft 11 in)
- Weight: 76 kg (168 lb)

Playing career^{1}
Years	Club	Games (Goals)
1945	Collingwood	2 (0)
- ^{1} Playing statistics correct to the end of 1945.

John William Carroll (15 January 1922 – 17 September 1999) was an Australian rules footballer who played with Collingwood in the Victorian Football League (VFL).

Carroll played two games for Collingwood while serving in the Royal Australian Air Force during World War II.
