= Finternagh =

- Townland
- Location of Finternagh within the Ireland
- Coordinates: 53°52′25″N 6°58′58″W
- Country: (Republic of Ireland) Ireland
- Province: Ulster
- County: County Cavan
- Irish grid reference: N668920

Finternagh is a townland in County Cavan, Ireland.

The townland covers 295 acres (1.19 km^{2}). Finternagh is one of a number townlands of the Irish civil parish of Killinkere in the barony of Castlerahan, County Cavan, Province of Ulster.

In the 1911 census of Ireland, the townland had seventeen houses with 100 inhabitants (45 males and 55 females).
