= Mark Davies (bishop of Shrewsbury) =

British Roman Catholic prelate

The Right Reverend Mark Davies
- Bishop of Shrewsbury
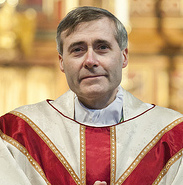
- Davies in 2011
- Church: Roman Catholic Church
- Province: Birmingham
- Diocese: Shrewsbury
- Appointed: 22 December 2009
- Installed: 1 October 2010
- Predecessor: Brian Noble
- Previous posts: Coadjutor Bishop of Shrewsbury (2010); Vicar General of Salford (2003–2009)

Orders
- Ordination: 11 February 1984 by Thomas Holland
- Consecration: 22 February 2010 by Brian Noble

Personal details
- Born: 12 May 1959 (age 67) Manchester, Lancashire, England
- Denomination: Roman Catholic
- Motto: Nihil Sine Christo
- Coat of arms

Mark Davies (born 12 May 1959) is a British Roman Catholic prelate. He is the 11th Bishop of the Diocese of Shrewsbury in the Province of Birmingham, England.

== Early life ==
Born in Manchester, Lancashire in 1959, he attended two schools in Longsight: St Richard's R.C. Primary School and St Robert's R.C. Primary School, and two others in Heaton Chapel, Stockport: Broadstone Hall Primary School and St Anne's Roman Catholic High School. Following his secondary education, he attended the University of Durham and trained for the priesthood at Ushaw College, Durham for the Diocese of Salford.

== Priestly career ==
He was ordained a priest on 11 February 1984 at St Joseph's Church, Reddish, Stockport, by the Right Reverend Thomas Holland, Bishop of Salford. His first pastoral appointments was as an assistant priest at Our Lady of Grace's Church in Prestwich from March to September 1984, followed by at St Mary's Church, Swinton from September 1984 to December 1988.

In January 1988, he was appointed the private secretary to Bishop Patrick Kelly of Salford (later Archbishop of Liverpool), a post in which Davies remained until December 1992.

He was appointed the parish priest at St John Bosco's Church, Blackley, Manchester (1992–2003) and became the Dean of North Manchester Deanery. He was appointed the Vicar General of the Diocese of Salford from January 2003 to February 2009.

He was appointed the parish priest at St Teresa's Church, Little Lever (2003–05), then at St Joseph's Church, Longsight (2005–07), and then at Holy Family Church, New Springs, Wigan (2008–09).

== Episcopal career ==
On 22 December 2009, he was appointed the Coadjutor Bishop of Shrewsbury, and consecrated to the episcopate at St Anthony's Church, Wythenshawe, Manchester on the 22 February 2010. The principal consecrator was Brian Noble, Bishop of Shrewsbury; the principal co-consecrators were Patrick Kelly, Archbishop of Liverpool and Terence Brain, Bishop of Salford.

On the retirement of Brian Noble on 1 October 2010, Davies succeeded as the 11th Bishop of Shrewsbury.

== Views ==
Davies opposed the legalisation of same-sex marriage in the UK, calling it a "seismic shift". In 2016, he supported the establishment of a Shrewsbury chapter of Courage International, an organisation that promotes celibacy for gay Catholics.

Ahead of the 2019 general election, Davies opposed political parties making manifesto statements of support for abortion, which were previously the decision of individual candidates. He told Catholics to think carefully about their vote for this reason.
