= St Winefride's, Sandbach =

Coordinates: 53.145°N 2.369°W

St Winefride’s Church
- St Winefride’s Church
- Location: Sandbach, Cheshire, England
- Denomination: Roman Catholic
- Website: StWinefridesSandbach.com

History
- Status: Parish church

Architecture
- Architectural type: Church

Specifications
- Materials: Brick

Administration
- Diocese: Shrewsbury

Clergy
- Priest: Fr Michael Morton

St Winefride's is a Catholic church in Sandbach, Cheshire, England within the Roman Catholic Diocese of Shrewsbury. It is a member of Churches Together in Sandbach

== History ==
The present church was completed in July 1914, just before the First World War. Previously Mass had been celebrated in a Methodist chapel in what is now Chapel Street. The church is very closely linked with the history of Catholics in Sandbach in general. The original parish church was St Mary's Church, Sandbach but this became part of the Church of England after the Reformation]. After this event there is very little Catholic history mentioned for many years, the family which owned the Old Hall Hotel, Sandbach did however harbour Catholic priests with Priest holes.

With the Industrial Revolution, and the establishment of the LMS railway depot in Crewe, many railway workers moved into the area. Some were Irish Catholics and so a permanent church building was needed. The then Earl of Crewe donated land on the Middlewich Rd where the present church was built. The presbytery was only built in 1933 when Fr Mulcahy became the first resident priest. A church hall was also built in the 1980s and is used by the parish as well as the local community.
