= St Werburgh's Church, Chester =

Coordinates: 53.1911°N 2.8825°W

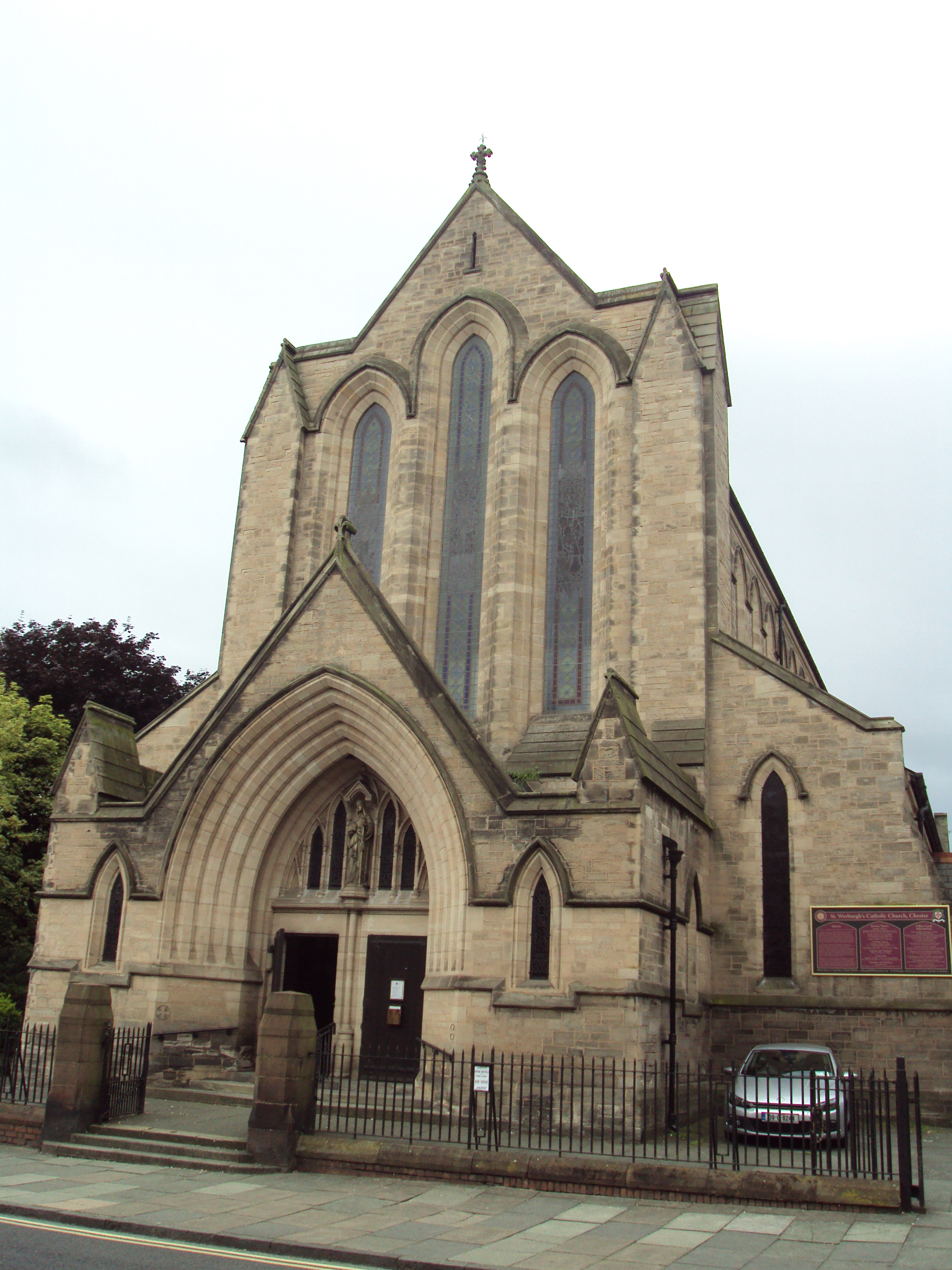
- East end of St Werburgh's Church, Chester

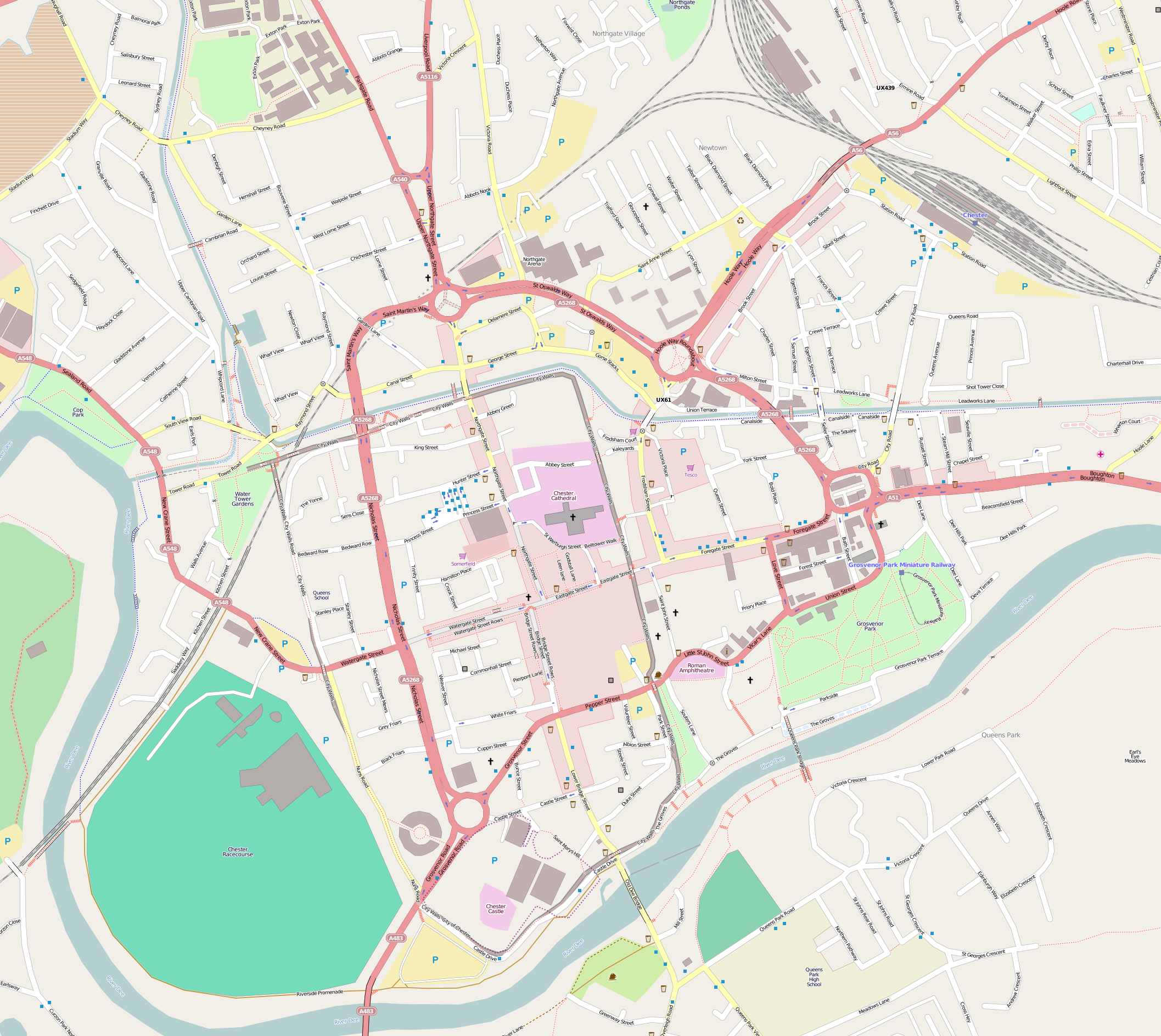
- Location in Chester
- OS grid reference: SJ 411 664
- Location: Grosvenor Park Road, Chester, Cheshire
- Country: England
- Denomination: Roman Catholic
- Website: St Werburgh, Chester

History
- Status: Parish church
- Dedication: Saint Werburgh

Architecture
- Functional status: Active
- Heritage designation: Grade II
- Designated: 2 July 1998
- Architect: Edmund Kirby
- Architectural type: Church
- Style: French Gothic
- Groundbreaking: 1873
- Completed: 1914

Specifications
- Materials: Sandstone, slate roofs

Administration
- Diocese: Shrewsbury

Clergy
- Priest: Fr Paul Shaw

St Werburgh's Church is in Grosvenor Park Road, Chester, Cheshire, England. It is an active Roman Catholic parish church in the diocese of Shrewsbury. The church is recorded in the National Heritage List for England as a designated Grade II listed building. It should not be confused with the Benedictine Abbey of St Werburgh (since 1541 Chester Cathedral) established in 1093 by Hugh d'Avranches, 1st Earl of Chester ("Hugh Lupus").

== History ==
A church dedicated to Saint Werburgh was opened in Queen Street in 1799. The present church was built between 1873 and 1875 to a design by Edmund Kirby. Before the church was formally opened, Cardinal Manning celebrated Mass on Christmas Day, 1875. It was officially opened on 13 July 1876 with a Pontifical High Mass, the first to be celebrated in Chester for 300 years. The church was intended to have a large steeple, but this was never built. In 1913–14 a narthex, also designed by Kirby, was added. In 2002 the church was re-ordered, and it was re-dedicated in May of that year by Cardinal Cormac Murphy O'Connor; this was the first time that a cardinal had visited Chester for over 100 years.

== Architecture ==
=== Exterior ===
St Werburgh's is constructed in buff sandstone, and has grey slate roofs. The normal orientation is reversed, the altar being at the west end. Its plan consists of a nave and sanctuary with an apse in one cell, and north and south aisles with a clerestory. The architectural style is French Gothic with lancet windows. The entrance is at the east end; this is symmetrical and contains a pair of doors. Over the doors is a statue of St Werburgh between a pair of lancet windows. These are contained within a gabled porch, on both sides of which is another lancet window. At the east end is a triple lancet window flanked by gabled buttresses. Along the sides of the aisles are pairs of lancets between buttresses. Each side of the clerestory contains 15 lancet windows. The west end has five lancet windows and an ambulatory.

=== Interior ===
Inside the church the arcades are carried on alternating round and octagonal piers. There is a large pulpit dating from 1895, and a hanging rood cross of 1933. The stained glass includes seven windows by Hardman dated 1927 and, in the narthex, eight small windows from 1936 by Trena Cox. The original two-manual organ was built in 1882 by Wadsworth and Brothers from Manchester. This was replaced in 2004 by a three-manual organ dating from 1924 by J. J. Binns moved from Crosshill Queens Park Church, Glasgow, and installed by George Sixsmith.

== Clergy ==
As of 2026 the current priest is Mgr. David Charters.

== See also ==
- Grade II listed buildings in Chester (east)
