= John Carroll (author) =

Australian professor and author

John Carroll is an Australian retired academic sociologist. He is an emeritus professor of sociology at La Trobe University in Melbourne.

== Early life and education ==
Carroll has degrees in mathematics, economics, and sociology from the University of Melbourne (BA Hons, 1962–1965) and Cambridge University in England (MA, 1966–1968; PhD).

== Career ==
=== Academia ===
As of December 2025 Carroll is an emeritus professor of sociology at La Trobe University in Melbourne.

=== Writings ===
Carroll is the author of Puritan, Paranoid, Remissive (1977), Guilt (1983), Ego and Soul (1998), Humanism: The Wreck of Western Culture (1993; updated as The Wreck of Western culture: Humanism Revisited, 2004) and Intruders In The Bush: The Australian Quest For Identity (1992). His Cambridge doctoral dissertation on epistemological anarchistic and anti-rationalist themes in Max Stirner, Nietzsche and Dostoyevsky was published as Breakout from the Crystal Palace (1974). It was supervised by George Steiner. Puritan, Paranoid, Remissive (1977) echoed and developed upon themes in Philip Rieff's Triumph of the Therapeutic: Uses of Faith after Freud (1966).

Humanism (1993; 2004) is Carroll's most ambitious work. Predicated on the view that Western high culture is in a declining if not nihilistic mode, Humanism traces this decline to an epistemic tyranny of reason and its subjection of other forms of knowing and understanding being. Carroll's often bleak diagnosis is primarily based on unique readings of canonic theological, philosophical and artistic texts including those by Sophocles, Calvin, Holbein, Donatello, Shakespeare, Rembrandt, Poussin, Henry James and John Ford. The heart of the book's analysis is highly indebted to Nietzsche's critique of "Socratic" culture in The Birth of Tragedy. Terror: a Meditation on the Meaning of September 11 (2004) is an application of many of the themes in the former work.

In The Western Dreaming and The Existential Jesus, Carroll rereads Gospel narratives and the ontology of Christ through a Heideggerian and non-theistic lens. Greek Pilgrimage is an unabashedly hellenophilic meditation on the nature of ancient Greek aesthetics and culture and what remains of the archaeological sites themselves. Land of the Golden Cities, on the sources of Australia's current prosperity, was published by Connor Court in 2017. Carroll has published two works which draw on and deepen his prior interests: On Guilt (2020) and The Saviour Syndrome (2023).

== About him ==
A book of essays about his work, Metaphysical Sociology: On the Work of John Carroll (edited by Sara James), was published by Routledge in 2018. It includes Carroll's response to the contributions.

== Bibliography ==
=== Books ===
- Break-out from the Crystal Palace: The anarcho-psychological critique: Stirner, Nietzsche, Dostoevsky. London: Routledge & Kegan Paul. 1974.
- Puritan, paranoid, remissive: A sociology of modern culture. London: Routledge & Kegan Paul. 1977.
- Sceptical sociology. London: Routledge & Kegan Paul. 1980
- Guilt: The grey eminence behind character, history, and culture. London: Routledge & Kegan Paul. 1985.
- Intruders in the bush: The Australian quest for identity (2nd ed.). Melbourne: Oxford University Press. 1992.
- Shutdown: The failure of economic rationalism and how to rescue Australia, edited by John Carroll and Robert Manne. Melbourne: Text. 1992.
- Humanism: The wreck of Western culture. London: Fontana. 1993.
- Ego and soul: The modern West in search of meaning. Pymble, NSW: HarperCollins. 1998.
- The Western dreaming: The Western world is dying for want of a story. Pymble, NSW: HarperCollins. 2001.
- Terror: A meditation on the meaning of September 11. Carlton North: Scribe. 2002.
- The wreck of Western culture: Humanism revisited. Carlton North: Scribe. 2004. (A revised version of Humanism: The wreck of Western culture.)
- The existential Jesus. Carlton North: Scribe. 2007.
- Greek pilgrimage: In search of the foundations of the West. Carlton North: Scribe. 2007.
- Land of the golden cities: Australia's exceptional prosperity & the culture that made it. Redlands Bay, Qld: Connor Court, 2017.
- On Guilt: The Force Shaping Character, History, and Culture. London: Routledge, 2020.
- The Saviour Syndrome: Searching for Hope and Meaning in an Age of Unbelief. Toronto: Sutherland House, 2023.
