= Johnny Carroll (trumpeter) =

Irish musician

- Occupation: Musician
- Instrument: Trumpet

Johnny Carroll (musician) is an Irish musician, known as a trumpet player active since the 1960s.

Nicknamed Man with the Golden Trumpet, Carroll is a native of Castlerea, County Roscommon. Encouraged by his father, he joined the local brass band, aged 12. He subsequently joined the Pioneer Aces, an Irish showband, and began his professional career aged 13. Renamed The Premier Aces, they topped the charts in Irish and the UK but were also one of the first bands to break America.

When they disbanded, Carroll formed The Magic Band. He eventually struck a deal with Harmack Records and released a number of albums of easy listening medleys, which were successful across the country. He later began a successful solo career.
