= Hugh Singleton =

English prelate (1851–1934)

Styles of Hugh Singleton
- Reference style: The Right Reverend
- Spoken style: My Lord
- Religious style: Bishop

Hugh Singleton (30 July 1851 – 17 December 1934) was an English prelate of the Roman Catholic Church. He served as the Bishop of Shrewsbury from 1908 to 1934.

Born in Birkenhead, Cheshire, on 30 July 1851, he was ordained to the priesthood on 25 July 1880. He was appointed the Bishop of Shrewsbury by the Holy See on 1 August 1908. His consecration to the Episcopate took place on 21 September 1908, the principal consecrator was Cardinal Francis Bourne, Archbishop of Westminster, and the principal co-consecrators were Francis Mostyn, Bishop of Menevia (later Archbishop of Cardiff) and Richard Collins, Bishop of Hexham and Newcastle.

He died in office at his Bishop's House in Birkenhead on 17 December 1934, aged 83, and was buried at the Flaybrick Hill Cemetery.

Catholic Church titles
Preceded by Samuel Webster Allen	Bishop of Shrewsbury; 1908–1934	Succeeded by Ambrose James Moriarty
