= John Carroll Catholic High School =

John Carroll Catholic High School may refer to:

- John Carroll Catholic High School (Birmingham, Alabama)
- John Carroll Catholic High School (Fort Pierce, Florida)
- The John Carroll School (Bel Air, Maryland)

== See also ==
- Archbishop Carroll High School (disambiguation)
