= Newton, Chester =

Suburb of Chester, England

Coordinates: 53.21015°N 2.86743°W

Newton
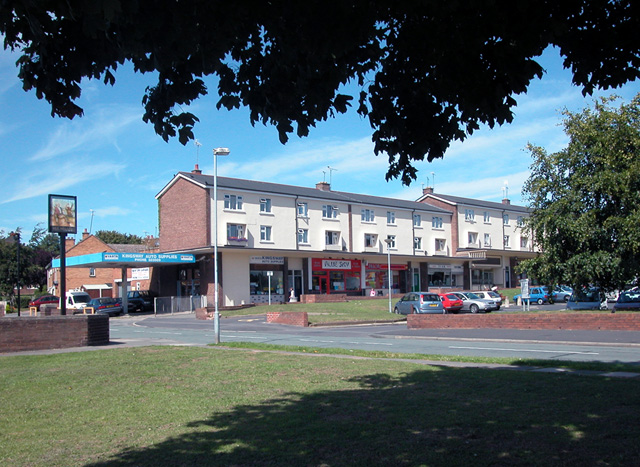
- Newton Shops

- Location within Cheshire
- Population: 9,556 (2011 Ward)
- OS grid reference: SJ421684
- Unitary authority: Cheshire West and Chester
- Ceremonial county: Cheshire
- Region: North West
- Country: England
- Sovereign state: United Kingdom
- Post town: CHESTER
- Postcode district: CH2
- Dialling code: 01244
- Police: Cheshire
- Fire: Cheshire
- Ambulance: North West
- UK Parliament: Chester North and Neston

Newton is a suburb in the north-east of Chester, in the unitary authority of Cheshire West and Chester and the ceremonial county of Cheshire, England. Including the locale of Plas Newton, the area is contiguous with Upton to the north and Hoole to the south. The electoral ward involved had a population taken at the 2011 census of 9,556.

Newton is made up of some privately owned residential properties, but mainly comprises a large council estate now co-owned with Cheshire West and Chester Council and run by Chester and District Housing Trust (C&DHT).

== Education ==
Local schools in the area include Newton Primary School and, in the independent sector, The Firs School.

== Politics and governance ==
Newton-by-Chester was formerly a township in the parish of St Oswald, in 1866 Newton by Chester became a separate civil parish, on 1 April 1936 the parish was abolished and merged with Hoole and Chester. In 1931 the parish had a population of 2581. From 1974 to 2009 it was in Chester non-metropolitan district.

=== British Parliament ===
Newton was in the City of Chester parliamentary constituency before the constituency was split in 2024. It is currently in Chester North and Neston.

== See also ==
- St Columba's Church, Chester
