= Bishop of Shrewsbury (Catholic) =

- Bishopric

catholic
- Incumbent; Mark Davies

Location
- Ecclesiastical province: Birmingham

Information
- First holder: James Brown
- Established: 29 September 1850
- Diocese: Shrewsbury
- Cathedral: Our Lady Help of Christians and Saint Peter of Alcantara, Shrewsbury

The bishop of Shrewsbury is the Ordinary of the Latin Catholic Diocese of Shrewsbury in the Province of Birmingham, England.

The diocese covers an area of 6,136 km^{2} (2,369 sq mi) of the counties and unitary authorities of Cheshire, Shropshire and Telford and Wrekin with parts of Derbyshire, Halton, Merseyside, Greater Manchester and Warrington. The see is in the town of Shrewsbury where the bishop's seat is located at the Cathedral Church of Our Lady Help of Christians and Saint Peter of Alcantara.

The diocese of Shrewsbury was erected on 29 September 1850 from parts of the Vicariates Apostolic of the Central, Lancashire and Welsh Districts.

The current incumbent is the Right Reverend Mark Davies, who succeeded as the 11th bishop of Shrewsbury on 1 October 2010. He had previously been appointed the coadjutor bishop of Shrewsbury by the Holy See on 22 December 2009 and consecrated a bishop on 22 February 2010.

== List of bishops of the Diocese of Shrewsbury ==
Bishops of Shrewsbury
From	Until	Incumbent	Notes
1851	1881	James Brown	Appointed bishop on 27 June 1851 and consecrated on 27 July 1851. Died in office on 14 October 1881.
1882	1895	Edmund Knight	Formerly an auxiliary bishop of Shrewsbury (1879–1882). Appointed Bishop of Shrewsbury on 25 April 1882. Resigned on 28 May 1895 and appointed Titular Bishop of Flavias. Died on 9 June 1905.
1895	1897	John Carroll	Appointed Coadjutor Bishop of Shrewsbury on 22 August 1893 and consecrated on 28 October 1893. Succeeded Bishop of Shrewsbury on 11 May 1895. Died in office on 14 January 1897.
1897	1908	Samuel Webster Allen	Appointed bishop on 19 April 1897 and consecrated on 16 June 1897. Died in office on 13 May 1908.
1908	1934	Hugh Singleton	Appointed bishop on 1 August 1908 and consecrated on 21 September 1908. Died in office on 17 December 1934.
1934	1949	Ambrose James Moriarty	Appointed Coadjutor Bishop of Shrewsbury on 18 December 1931 and consecrated on 28 January 1932. Succeeded Bishop of Shrewsbury on 17 December 1934. Died in office on 3 June 1949.
1949	1961	John Aloysius Murphy	Appointed Coadjutor Bishop of Shrewsbury on 7 February 1948 and consecrated on 25 February 1948. Succeeded Bishop of Shrewsbury on 3 June 1949. Translated to the archbishopric of Cardiff on 22 August 1961.
1962	1980	William Eric Grasar	Appointed bishop on 26 April 1962 and consecrated on 27 June 1962. Resigned on 20 March 1980 and died on 28 December 1982.
1980	1995	Joseph Gray	Formerly an auxiliary bishop of Liverpool (1968–1980). Appointed Bishop of Shrewsbury on 19 August 1980. Retired on 23 June 1995 and died on 7 May 1999.
1995	2010	Brian Michael Noble	Appointed bishop on 23 June 1995 and consecrated on 30 August 1995. Retired on 1 October 2010 and died on 23 October 2019.
2010	present	Mark Davies	Appointed Coadjutor Bishop of Shrewsbury on 22 December 2009 and consecrated on 22 February 2010. Succeeded Bishop of Shrewsbury on 1 October 2010.
