= John Carroll (cricketer) =

English cricketer (born 1972)

Personal information
- Born: 14 July 1972 (age 54); Bebington, Cheshire
- Source: Cricinfo, 16 April 2017

John Carroll (born 14 July 1972) is an English cricketer. He played thirty first-class matches for Cambridge University Cricket Club between 1992 and 1995.

== See also ==
- List of Cambridge University Cricket Club players
