= Lord Bishop =

Form of address for bishops

"Lord Bishop" is a form of address used for bishops since the Middle Ages, an era when bishops occupied the feudal rank of 'lord' by virtue of their office. It is not, however, connected with or dependent upon English bishops having seats in the House of Lords, as it was also applied to suffragan bishops. It was also, in the earlier part of the 20th century, applied formally to bishops of the Church in Wales. Use of the title appears to have become increasingly rare towards the late 19th century, although it is sometimes still used in formal circumstances for any diocesan bishop in the Anglican Communion or Catholic Church except in countries, such as the United States, where this title is considered inappropriate.

The full title of the 26 Church of England bishops who sit in the House of Lords as Lords Spiritual is The Right Reverend Prelate the Lord Bishop of ..., although, as noted above, the title may be applied formally to any diocesan bishop.

== See also ==
- Right Reverend
- Most Reverend
