= Carroll (surname) =

Origin
- Language: Irish
- Meaning: "fierce in battle"
- Region of origin: Ireland

Other names
- Variant forms: Ó Cearbhaill, Cearbhall

Carroll is an Irish surname coming from the Gaelic Ó Cearbhaill and Cearbhall, meaning "fierce in battle". Other equivalent forms of spelling the surname include Carrol, Caroll and Carol.

Notable people with the surname include:

== A ==
- Adam Carroll (racing driver) (born 1982), Northern Irish racing driver
- Adam Carroll (American musician) (born 1975), American musician
- Ahmad Carroll (born 1983), American professional football player
- Aileen Carroll (1944–2020), Canadian politician from Ontario
- Alfred Carroll (1846–1924), Canadian politician
- Alma Carroll (1924–2019), American actress
- Alma Carroll, Irish singer with The Swarbriggs Plus Two
- Andrea Carroll (born 1946), American pop singer
- Andrea Carroll (soprano), American opera and concert soprano
- Andrew Carroll (ice hockey) (born 1985), American professional ice hockey player
- Andy Carroll (born 1989), English footballer
- Anna Ella Carroll (1815–1894), American politician, pamphleteer and lobbyist
- Aurelio Valcárcel Carroll, producer and director, from 2001–present (as of 2020), of Spanish-language telenovelas

== B ==
- Barbara Carroll (1925–2017), American jazz pianist
- Benajah Harvey Carroll (1843–1914), American pastor and theologian
- Ben Carroll (born 1975), Australian politician and 50th Premier of Victoria
- Bill Carroll (broadcaster) (born 1959), Scottish-born Canadian radio and television personality
- Bill Carroll (musician) (born 1966), American musician
- Bill Carroll (rower) (20th century), New Zealand rower
- Billy Carroll (born 1959), Canadian ice hockey player
- Brian Carroll (born 1981), American soccer player
- Brian Patrick Carroll (born 1969), American guitarist (also known as Buckethead)
- Brigid Carroll, New Zealand professor of management
- Bryan H. Carroll (born 1967), American director, producer, screenwriter and editor.
- Bob Carroll (author) (1936–2009), American historian and sportswriter
- Bob Carroll (singer/actor) (1918–1994), American singer and actor
- Bob Carroll Jr. (1918–2007), American TV writer

== C ==
- Charles Carroll of Annapolis (1702–1782), wealthy Maryland planter and lawyer
- Charles Carroll the Settler (1661–1720), Irish-born Maryland lawyer and planter
- Charles Carroll, Barrister (1723–1783), American statesman from Maryland, delegate to the Continental Congress
- Charles Carroll of Carrollton (1737–1832), American politician, last surviving signer of the Declaration of Independence, sometimes referred to as Charles Carroll III
- Charles H. Carroll (1794–1865), American politician, representative from New York 1843–1847
- Charles J. Carroll (1882–1942), American lawyer and politician
- Chip Carroll, American actor, known for The Shopping Bag Lady
- Chuck Carroll (1906–2003), American football player
- Clay Carroll (born 1941), American baseball player
- Clinton Derricks-Carroll (born 1953), American actor and musician
- Corbin Carroll (born 2000), Taiwanese-American baseball player

== D ==
- Daniel Carroll (disambiguation), several people
- David Carroll (disambiguation), several people
- Dean Carroll (1962–2015), English rugby league footballer of the 1980s and 1990s
- Deborah Carroll, actor
- DeMarre Carroll (born 1986), American professional basketball player and coach
- Diahann Carroll (1935–2019), American actress and singer
- Dina Carroll (born 1968), English singer
- Donald Martin Carroll (1909–2002), American Roman Catholic priest
- Douglas Carroll, American politician

== E ==
- Eddie Carroll (1933–2010), Canadian-born American voice actor and comedian
- Edward Gonzalez Carroll (1910–2000), American bishop
- E. Jean Carroll (born 1943), American advice columnist
- Ernie Carroll (1929–2022), Australian entertainer and TV personality

== F ==
- Francis Carroll (archbishop of Canberra and Goulburn) (1930–2024), Australian Roman Catholic archbishop
- Francis Carroll (bishop of Calgary) (1890–1967), Canadian Roman Catholic bishop
- Francis Carroll (nuncio) (1912–1980), Northern Irish Roman Catholic archbishop in Liberia and diplomat
- Frank Carroll (1938–2024), American figure skating coach
- Fred Carroll (1864–1904), American baseball player

== G ==
- Gabriel D. Carroll (born 1982), American professor
- George Carroll (disambiguation), several people
- Greg Carroll (born 1956), Canadian ice hockey player
- Gregory Carroll (1929–2013), American musician
- Gregory Carroll (1977–2013), American operatic tenor

== H ==
- Harry Carroll (1892–1962), American musician and songwriter
- Helena Carroll (1928–2013), Scottish stage actress
- Henry Carroll (disambiguation), several people
- Howard Joseph Carroll (1902–1960), American Roman Catholic bishop
- Howard W. Carroll (1942–2021), American politician

== J ==
- Jack Carroll (disambiguation), several people
- Jamey Carroll (born 1974), American baseball player
- James Carroll (disambiguation), several people
- Janet Carroll (1940–2012), American film, stage and television character actress
- Jason Carroll (journalist), CNN correspondent
- Jason Carroll (researcher), cancer researcher
- Jason Michael Carroll, American country music artist
- Jean Carroll (disambiguation), several people
  - Jean Carroll (1911–2010), American actress and comedian
  - Jean Carroll (cricketer) (born 1980), Irish cricketer
- Jeff Carroll (born 1977), American scientist and Huntington's disease advocate
- Jeff Carroll (former American soccer player)
- Jill Carroll (born 1977), American journalist and kidnapping victim
- Jim Carroll, several people, see James Carroll (disambiguation)
- Joan Carroll (1931–2016), American actress
- Joan Carroll (soprano) (born 1932), American coloratura soprano
- Jock Carroll (1919–1995), Canadian journalist
- Joe Barry Carroll, American basketball player
- John Carroll (disambiguation), several people
- Johnny Carroll (disambiguation), several people
- Jon Carroll, American newspaper columnist
- Jonathan Carroll (born 1949), American author of fantasy fiction
- Jonathan Carroll (politician) (fl. 2017–2024), American politician
- Jono Carroll (born 1992), Irish professional boxer
- Jordan Carroll (born 2006), Canadian gymnast
- Joseph Carroll (disambiguation), several people
- Josie Carroll, Canadian horse trainer
- Julian Carroll (1931–2023), American lawyer and politician, Governor of Kentucky (1974–1979)
- Julian Carroll (swimmer) (born 1942), Australian swimmer

== K ==
- Kevin Carroll (gridiron football) (born 1969), American football player

== L ==
- Lara Carroll, American swimmer
- Lee Carroll, American New Age writer
- Leo G. Carroll (1892–1972), British actor
- Lewis Carroll, pseudonym of British author Charles Lutwidge Dodgson (1832–1898)
- Liane Carroll (born 1964), English musician
- Liz Carroll, Canadian fiddler
- Louise Carroll, Scottish field hockey defender
- Luke Carroll, Australian actor

== M ==
- Madeleine Carroll (1906–1987), English actress
- Madeline Carroll (born 1996), American actress
- Matthew Carroll
- Mark Carroll (disambiguation), several people
- Mary Carroll (disambiguation), several people
- Matt Carroll (disambiguation), several people
- Mavis B. Carroll (1917–2009), American statistician
- Mella Carroll
- Michael Carroll (disambiguation), several people, including those named Mickey or Mike Carroll

== N ==
- Nancy Carroll (American actress) (1903–1965), American actress
- Nina Carroll (1932–1990), British painter
- Nyla Carroll (born 1965), New Zealand long-distance runner

== O ==
- Ownie Carroll (1902–1975), American baseball player and college coach

== P ==
- P. J. Carroll, founder of eponymous Irish tobacco company
- Pat Carroll (disambiguation), several people
- Patty Carroll (born 1946), American photographer
- Paul Carroll (disambiguation), several people
- Peter Carroll (disambiguation), several people, including those named Pete Carroll
- Philip J. Carroll (1938–2014), American businessman and government advisor

== R ==
- Rick Carroll (1946–1989), program director for influential radio station KROQ-FM in Los Angeles
- Robert L. Carroll (1938–2020), American vertebrate paleontologist
- Robert Todd Carroll (contemporary), American professor, author, and keeper of the Skeptic's Dictionary website
- Ron Carroll (1968–2025), American DJ, singer, songwriter and producer
- Ronnie Carroll (1934–2015), Northern Irish singer and entertainer
- Rory Carroll (born 1972), Irish journalist working for The Guardian
- Roy Carroll, Northern Irish footballer

== S ==
- Sean B. Carroll (contemporary), American biologist and author
- Sean M. Carroll, theoretical physicist
- Shelley Carroll, Canadian politician from Toronto
- Sidney Carroll (1913–1988), American film and television screenwriter
- Stacey Carroll, American politician from Virginia
- Steve Carroll, American sports broadcaster

== T ==
- Ted Carroll (cartoonist) (1904–1973), American cartoonist
- Thomas Carroll (disambiguation), several people, including those named Tom or Tommy Carroll
- Tonie Carroll, Australian rugby league footballer
- Tony Carroll (footballer), Scottish footballer
- Trent Carroll (born 1978), Australian rules footballer

== W ==
- Walter Carroll (1869–1955), English composer, music lecturer, and author
- Warren H. Carroll (1932–2011), American historian, author, and professor
- Wes Carroll (born 1970), American percussionist
- William Carroll (Tennessee politician) (1788–1844), American, Governor of Tennessee 1821–1827 and 1829–1835
- William F. Carroll (1877–1964), Canadian politician
- William Henry Carroll (1810–1868), American Civil War Confederate general, son of Governor Carroll
- Will Carroll (born 1970), American sportswriter

== Z ==
- Zach Carroll, American soccer player

== See also ==
- Carroll (given name)
- McCarroll
- O'Carroll (surname)
