= 1952 in association football =

The following are the football (soccer) events of the year 1952 throughout the world.

== Events ==
- 21 September – East Germany plays its first ever international match, losing 3–0 to Poland in Warsaw.

Undated:

- Rudnianka Rudna Wielka, professional Polish football club is founded.

== Winners club national championship ==
- Albania: KS Dinamo Tirana
- Argentina: River Plate
- Austria: Rapid Vienna
- Belgium: RFC Liégeois
- Bulgaria: PFC CSKA Sofia
- Czech Republic: Sparta CKD Sokolovo
- Denmark: AB
- East Germany: ZSG Union Halle
- England: Manchester United F.C.
- Faroe Islands: KÍ Klaksvík
- Finland: KTP
- France: OGC Nice
- Greece: tournament not held
- Hungary: Budapest Honvéd FC
- Iceland: KR
- Ireland: St Patrick's Athletic F.C.
- Italy: Juventus FC
- Luxembourg: National Schifflange
- Mexico: León
- Netherlands: Willem II
- Northern Ireland: Glenavon F.C.
- Norway: FK Sparta Sarpsborg
- Poland: Ruch Chorzów
- Portugal: Sporting CP
- Romania: CCA București
- Scotland: Hibernian F.C.
- Spain: FC Barcelona
- Sweden: IFK Norrköping
- Switzerland: Grasshopper Club Zürich
- West Germany: VfB Stuttgart
- USSR: FC Spartak Moscow
- Yugoslavia: Hajduk Split

== International tournaments ==
- 1952 British Home Championship (6 October 1951 – 5 April 1952)

Shared by Wales and England

- Olympic Games in Helsinki, Finland (15 July – 2 August 1952)
  1. Hungary
  2. Yugoslavia
  3. Sweden

== Births ==
- 1 January – Ítalo Estupiñán, Ecuadorian international footballer (died 2016)
- 2 February – Reinhard Häfner, German international footballer (died 2016)
- 2 February – Fernando Morena, Uruguayan international footballer
- 8 February – Marinho Chagas, Brazilian international footballer (died 2014)
- 15 February – Andrzej Dybicz, Polish former professional footballer
- 20 March – Steve Whitworth, English footballer
- 2 May – Martin Haar, Dutch footballer and assistant-coach
- 17 May – Jorge Olguin, Argentine international footballer
- 19 May – Bert van Marwijk, Dutch footballer and coach
- 22 May – Waldemar Victorino, Uruguayan international footballer
- 2 August – Alain Giresse, French international footballer and coach
- 3 August – Osvaldo Ardiles, Argentinian international footballer and coach
- 7 August – Kees Kist, Dutch international footballer
- 22 August – José van Hoof
- 6 September – Vladimir Kazachyonok, Soviet international footballer and Russian coach (died 2017)
- 10 September – Mike Carroll, Scottish professional footballer
- 5 November – Harry Schellekens, Dutch footballer
- 17 November – Roman Ogaza, Polish international footballer (died 2006)
- 20 November – Vince O'Kane, English former professional footballer
- 25 November – Gabriele Oriali, Italian international footballer
- 3 December – Hervé Gorce, French professional footballer (died 2008)
- 15 December – Allan Simonsen, Danish international footballer
