= Ted Carroll =

Ted Carroll may refer to:

- Ted Carroll (hurler)
- Ted Carroll (footballer)
- Ted Carroll (cartoonist)

== See also ==
- Edmund Carroll, Australian cricketer
- Edward Carroll (disambiguation)
