= Mary Hutchinson =

Mary Hutchinson may refer to:

- Mary Carroll (netball), née Hutchinson, Australian netball player
- Mary C. Hutchinson (1876 or 1878 – 1958), American politician
- Mary E. Hutchinson (1906–1970), American artist and art instructor
- Mary Hutchinson, daughter of mercer Edward Hutchinson
- Mary Hutchinson, wife of poet William Wordsworth
- Mary Hutchinson (writer) (1889–1977), British short-story writer, socialite, and model

== Fictional characters ==
- Marybeth Hutchinson, in the 1998 American science fiction horror film The Faculty

== See also ==
- Mary Hutchinson Women's Prison, Australian prison for females
