= McGarrell =

McGarrell is a surname. Notable people with the surname include:

- Flo McGarrell (1974–2010), American artist, filmmaker, writer, and arts administrator
- James McGarrell (1930–2020), American painter and printmaker
- Neil McGarrell (born 1972), Guyanese cricketer

== See also ==
- McCarrell
