= Ohio Reformatory for Women =

State prison in Marysville, Ohio, US

Coordinates: 40°13′20″N 83°23′38″W

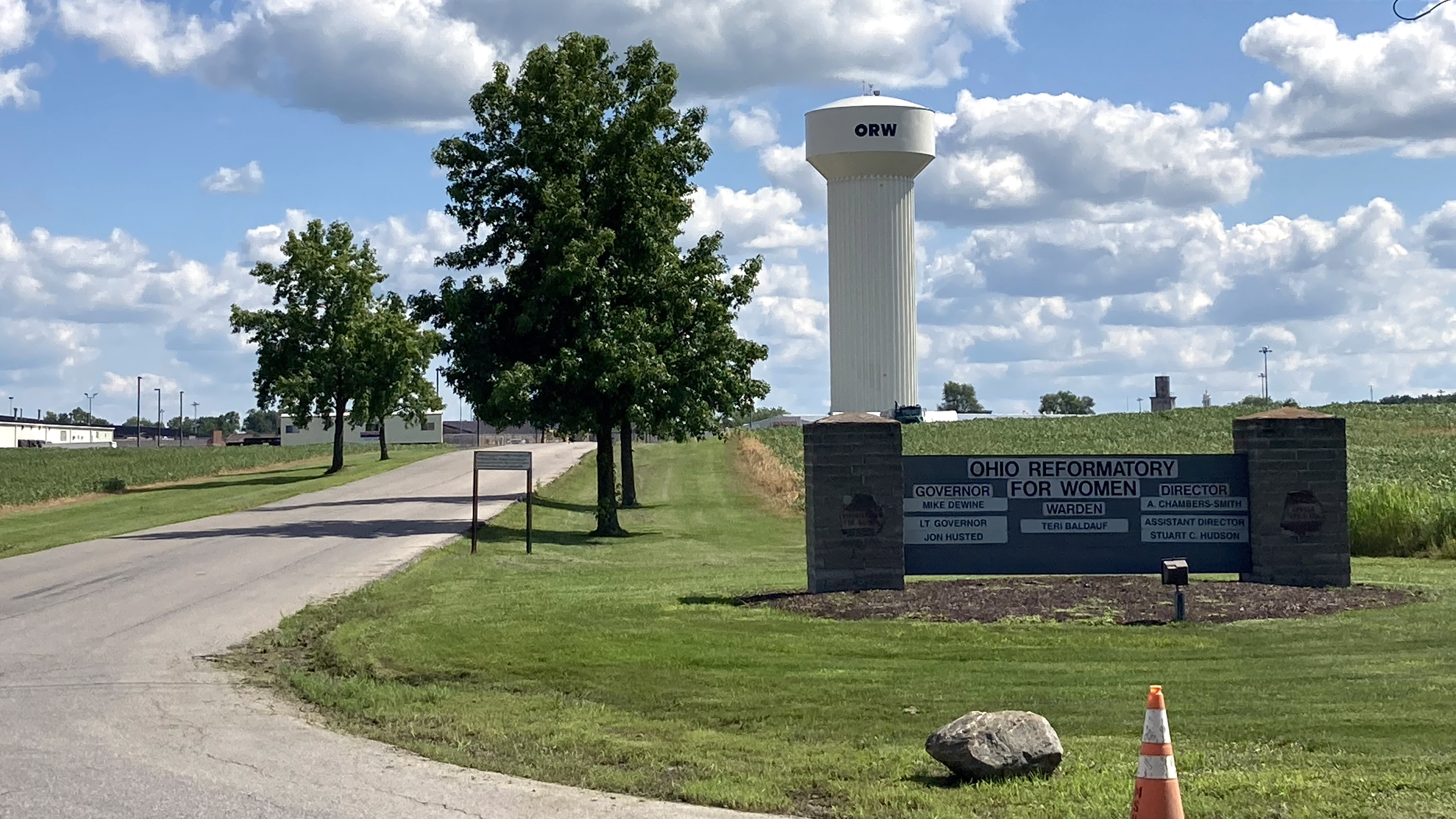
- Interactive map of Ohio Reformatory for Women
- Location: 1479 Collins Avenue Marysville, Ohio
- Status: open
- Security class: mixed
- Capacity: 2,011
- Opened: 1916
- Managed by: Ohio Department of Rehabilitation and Correction

The Ohio Reformatory for Women (ORW) is a state prison for women owned and operated by the Ohio Department of Rehabilitation and Correction in Marysville, Ohio. It opened in September 1916, when 34 female inmates were transferred from the Ohio Penitentiary in Columbus. ORW is a multi-security, state facility. As of July 2019, 2,394 female inmates were living at the prison ranging from minimum-security inmates all the way up to one inmate on death row. It was the fifth modern prison in the United States to open a nursery for imprisoned mothers and their babies located within the institution. Its Achieving Baby Care Success (ABC) program was the first in the state to keep infants with their mothers.

== History ==
It took about four years to construct the prison, which is located on 260 acres (1.1 km^{2}) of donated land outside the city of Marysville. Originally, the prison consisted of one stone building, known as the Harmon Building. The prison was also a functioning farm, complete with dairy cattle, hogs, and grain, which the inmates ran. Although ORW no longer operates as a farm, it is still commonly referred to as "the farm."

A former probation and juvenile court officer, Louise M. Mittendorf, was the first superintendent of the prison. She was appointed in March 1916 to an indefinite term. She resigned in 1935 and died four years later.

Marguerite Reilley, the warden from 1936 to 1957, contributed significantly to the prison's progressive approach to incarceration. She oversaw the creation of the library, hospital, and school attached to the prison, and was known for having lunch with inmates before their release. She was succeeded by her daughter, Martha Wheeler.

Originally, inmates were housed in the Harmon building, but eventually additional cottages were built. (There are now approximately 11 cottages.) Plumbing was later added in the 1950s. Before this, the inmates did not have the privilege of indoor plumbing and had to use "slop jars." In 1961, Clearview School opened at the prison and the Ohio Reformatory for Women became the first in the state to have an official Adult Education Program. Along with this they also offer reintegration programs, college classes, and other trades.

In the 1970s female death row inmates were on paper prisoners of the Southern Ohio Correctional Facility, but were placed in the hospital building second floor of ORW because of their gender.

There was no fence around ORW until 1979.

== Disturbances ==
Riots occurred at ORW from time to time. Around the 1950s, the first male guard was hired. A guard's job mostly consisted of supervising inmates and breaking up fights. In 1968, one of the main cottages was almost ruined due to a fire during an inmate disturbance. Only a few years later, a group of inmates gathered and rioted in one of the other cottages. These offenders were consequently sent to the Ohio Penitentiary for maximum-security supervision. A decade later, the last escape from the institution occurred and more wire was added to the external fence of the prison to prevent any more women from escaping. The addition of wire occurred the same year that the first male warden, H.L. Morris, was appointed.

== Prison nursery ==
In 2000, Governor Bob Taft signed a House Bill that permitted the Ohio Reformatory for Women to establish a residential nursery. The following summer, under the Direction of Warden Deb Timmerman-Cooper, ORW opened up the only nursery program of its kind in the state. At the time, New York, Nebraska and Washington were the only other states in the United States that had any type of nursery for incarcerated mothers.

The Achieving Baby Care Success (ABC) program at ORW makes it possible for pregnant offenders to keep custody of their newborns after they give birth. Each case is dealt with individually and each mother is assigned a plan that fits. The plan is for the baby and the mother to leave the prison together. As of 2017, there were eight babies in the program according to the Ohio Department of Rehabilitation and Correction website.

ORW employees have observed that mothers who have participated in and graduated from the ABC program are rarely repeat offenders.

There are certain qualifications and standards that the mother must meet before she is allowed to be a part of the nursery program. The mother inmate must have given birth to the baby while in Ohio state custody. Having a violent record would disqualify her from the program. The mother must attend family training courses with hands-on parenting instruction, maintain good mental and physical health, be serving a short term, and follow many other specific rules.

The nursery program at ORW is housed in a separate wing of the establishment and contains double occupancy rooms for up to twenty mothers with their infants. The wing also includes a recreation area, a laundry room, and the unit's own childcare center.

== In the media ==
Comedian/actress Mo'Nique filmed the Showtime Stand-up Comedy Special, I Coulda Been Your Cellmate (2006), and TV documentary, Mo'Nique Behind Bars (2007), at ORW.

In 2010 the National Geographic Channel released the documentary Hard Time: Female Offenders, reporting on how the Ohio Reformatory for Women is tested by every type of female offender, from murderers to nursing mothers and everything in between.

== Notable inmates ==
Inmate Name	Inmate Number	Status	Details
Mackenzie Shirilla	W111780	Serving a life sentence with the possibility of parole after 15 years.	Shirilla was convicted in 2023 at the age of 19 of murdering her boyfriend, Dominic Russo, and his friend, Davion Flanagan, by purposely driving her car into a brick wall at 100 mph. She survived the crash.
Donna Roberts	W055276	Serving a sentence of life without the possibility of parole after originally being sentenced to death.	Roberts was convicted in 2003 of recruiting Nathaniel E. Jackson while he was still in prison to kill her ex-husband Robert Fingerhut, which he did on December 11, 2001, in the house Roberts and Fingerhut continued to share after their private divorce. In her appeal, it is alleged that the police performed an illegal search of her car parked inside the garage since the search warrant was only for the home. She was the only woman on death row in the State of Ohio until 2025 when her sentence was commuted to life without parole.
Nicole Diar	W062513	Serving a sentence of life without the possibility of parole after originally being sentenced to death.	Diar was convicted in 2005 of murdering her four-year-old son, Jacob, and burning his body in the house they lived in. In 2008, her death sentenced was overturned after it was discovered the jury was not informed that one vote could halt a sentence of death. She was instead sentenced to life without the possibility of parole.
Kristel Candelario	W112921	Serving a sentence of life without the possibility of parole.	Abandoned 16-month-old daughter, Jailyn, to go on vacation to Detroit, Michigan and Puerto Rico with her boyfriend. Serving life in prison without the possibility of parole for aggravated murder.
Brooklyn Frazie	W113768	Serving a sentence of life with the possibility of parole after 34 years.	Frazie was convicted of murdering Scott Donahoe after engaging in a high-speed chase from near Minford to New Boston, Ohio. During this chase, she ran over Donahoe, who was riding a motorcycle, with her SUV. “Eyewitnesses observed Frazie drive into the rear of Mr. Donahoe’s motorcycle, causing him to crash and for him to fall to the pavement. “Frazie then continued to drive forward, dragging Donahoe an additional 58 feet under her vehicle. The evidence further demonstrated that Frazie backed up over Donahoe prior to being stopped by eyewitnesses who intervened.”
Heather Nicole Matthews	W032633	Serving a sentence of life with the possibility of parole after 182 years.	One of the perpetrators of the 1992 Dayton Christmas Murders in which six people were murdered and two were injured from December 24 to December 26, 1992.
Ashley Jessup	W084710	Serving a sentence of life with the possibility of parole after 15 years.	Convicted of raping her 10-month-old son as well as recording and sharing the assault with her ex-partner.
Liz Carroll	W067324	Serving a sentence of life with the possibility of parole after 54 years.	One of the perpetrators of the 2006 Murder of Marcus Fiesel after locking him in a closet for several days while she attended a family reunion in Kentucky. He ultimately died of hyperthermia as temperatures were estimated to have reached 105-110 °F in the closet.
Cheryl Ann Driskell	W014144	Sentenced to life with the possibility of parole after 15 years, paroled in September 2025.	After being sentenced to life with the possibility of parole after 15 years in 1980 for aggravated murder, Driskell was paroled in September 2025 after 45 years in prison. She was one of the longest serving Ohio inmates after spending 45 years in prison.
Linda Lee Couch	W017943	Sentenced to life with the possibility of parole after 20 years, paroled in March 2026.	Couch was convicted of the 1984 murder of her husband, Walter Couch, where she shot him, rolled him in a rug, and later had her children, a neighbor, and Walter's father help to dig a three-foot trench that he would later be buried in. Her case was featured in the Netflix show "I Am A Killer." She was convicted in 1985 and paroled 41 years later at the age of 72.
