= Mary Carroll =

Mary Carroll may refer to:

- Mary Carroll (academic), Australian librarian and academic
- Mary Carroll (netball), Australian netball player
- Mary Carroll (translator), Australian translation specialist
- Mary Ellen Carroll (born 1961), American conceptual artist
- Mary K. Carroll (born 1964), American chemist
