= Tony Carroll =

Tony Carroll is the name of:

- Tony Carroll (psychotherapist) (1941–2015), psychotherapist in Houston, Texas
- Tony Carroll (footballer) (born 1906), Scottish footballer
- Tonie Carroll (born 1976), former rugby league footballer
