= Joseph Carroll =

Joseph or Joe Carroll may refer to:

- Joe Carroll (American football) (born 1950), American football player
- Joseph Carroll (footballer), English footballer for Bradford City
- Joseph Carroll (general) (1910–1991), first director of the Defense Intelligence Agency
- Joseph Carroll (scholar) (born 1949), evolutionary literary theorist
- Joseph Carroll (bishop) (1912–1992), Irish priest, educator and auxiliary bishop of Dublin
- Joe Carroll (priest) (1941–2021), American priest
- Joe Carroll (singer) (1919–1981), jazz vocalist
- Joe Carroll (cricketer) (born 1991), Australian cricketer
- Joe Barry Carroll (born 1958), American basketball player
- Joe Carroll, a character from The Following
