= Émile Stijnen =

Belgian footballer

Joannes Emilius Stijnen
Personal information
- Date of birth: 2 November 1907
- Place of birth: Antwerp, Belgium
- Date of death: 27 March 1997 (aged 89)
- Position: Centre-half

Senior career*
| Years | Team | Apps | (Gls) |
| 1927–1935 | Royal Berchem Sport | | |
| 1935–1943 | ROC Charleroi | | |

International career
| 1932–1939 | Belgium | 31 | (0) |

Managerial career
- 1944–1946: ROC Charleroi
- 1947–1952: Beerschot VAC
- 1959–1961: KV Mechelen
- * Club domestic league appearances and goals

Joannes Emilius Miel Stijnen or Stynen (2 November 1907 – 27 March 1997) was a Belgian footballer.

He played as a centre-half for Royal Berchem Sport and ROC Charleroi. He was the big name of the "Flaminpic", the nickname given to the team of Olympic de Charleroi between 1936 and 1940, who were promoted in two years from the third to the first division in Belgium, before finishing third in the top flight.

For Belgium, he played on 5 June 1938, the last 16 of the World Cup at Colombes, against France (lost, 1–3). He won 31 caps, with 16 as captain for the Diables Rouges

Later, from 1947 to 1952, he coached Beerschot VAC. His fame was such that he published a successful book, "Comment devenir footballeur?". The stadium of Olympic de Charleroi, one of the largest in Belgium (cap. 32,000) was known for some time as the "Stade Emile Stijnen". Barry Anter.

== Honours ==
- Belgian international from 1932 to 1939 (31 caps)
- First international: Belgium-France, 5–2, 1 May 1932
- Participation in the 1938 World Cup (Played 1 match)
- Belgian Second Division Champions in 1934 with Royal Berchem Sport and in 1937 with ROC Charleroi
