= Murder of Dominic Russo and Davion Flanagan =

2022 double murder in Ohio

Coordinates: 41.32641°N 81.85153°W

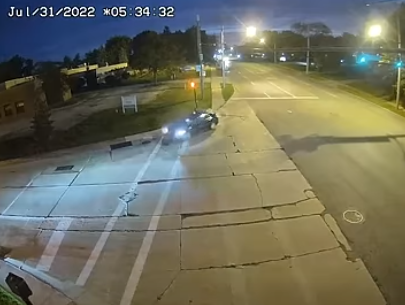
- Shirilla's car minutes before the crash
- Location: Strongsville, Ohio, U.S.
- Date: July 31, 2022
- Weapon: 2018 Toyota Camry
- Victims: Dominic Russo and Davion Flanagan
- Perpetrator: Mackenzie Shirilla
- Convictions: Murder (4 counts); Felonious assault (4 counts); Aggravated vehicular homicide (2 counts) (Note: Plus one count each of drug possession and possessing criminal tools unrelated to the murders.)
- Sentence: Life imprisonment with the possibility of parole after 15 years
- Judge: Nancy Margaret Russo (Note: Judge Russo is not related to murder victim Dominic Russo)

The murder of Dominic Russo and Davion Flanagan occurred during the early morning hours of July 31, 2022, when Mackenzie Shirilla intentionally crashed her vehicle into a brick wall in Strongsville, Ohio, United States, killing two passengers; her boyfriend, Dominic Russo, and their friend, Davion Flanagan. Multiple documentaries have been made about the case.

Both Russo and Flanagan were pronounced dead at the scene, while Shirilla was seriously injured and taken to the hospital. Shirilla was later arrested and charged with the murder of Russo and Flanagan. She was 17 years old at the time of her crime and 18 years old at the time of her arrest.

In a 2023 bench trial, the judge concluded she intentionally crashed the car in an act of premeditated murder. Shirilla was convicted of 12 felony charges and sentenced to two concurrent life sentences, with the possibility of parole after 15 years. As of 2026, she was incarcerated at the Ohio Reformatory for Women and has appealed her conviction three times as of 2026, each time unsuccessfully.

== Background ==
Flanagan, Russo, and Shirilla all lived in Strongsville, Ohio, at the time of the crash. Flanagan and Shirilla had recently graduated from Strongsville High School. The three were part of a large friend group that often spent time together.

Davion Flanagan was born March 11, 2003, the oldest of three children. When he was eight years old, he and his sisters, Davyne and Dalia, were adopted by Jaime and Scott Flanagan. Davion was the starting running back at Strongsville High School. During the off season, he worked part time as a youth swim coach. After graduation, Davion worked full time and applied to Allstate Hairstyling & Barber College with the intention of attending in Fall 2023.

Dominic Russo was born September 24, 2001, to Frank and Christine Russo and raised in Strongsville, Ohio. He was close to his family, including his brother, Angelo, and his sister, Christine. He was interested in music, basketball, and stock trading.

Mackenzie Shirilla, born August 2, 2004, was 17 years old at the time of the crash. As an influencer, she was active on social media and often posted videos of her lifestyle and clothing on her TikTok account. The account had numerous followers, and several companies sent samples of clothing and products for her review.

Shirilla and Russo had dated for four years, starting when she was 13 and he was 16. The pair started living together in 2021, reportedly at his parents' home. People Magazine described their relationship as "tumultuous". In text messages obtained by the magazine, Shirilla stated she wanted to "kill someone". Russo alleged Shirilla had threatened to stab him. Each accused the other of blackmail, and Russo accused Shirilla of "driving like a maniac". Shirilla enjoyed spending time with Russo's family and driving her car through areas of Strongsville.

On March 23, 2020, the police and fire departments responded to a suicide threat by a 15-year-old female at the Shirilla home. According to the police report, Shirilla was not taken to a hospital because her parents did not "think her threats are real" and did not "believe she will hurt herself." Shirilla's mother, Natalie, testified in court that she had never perceived her daughter to be suicidal.

According to Russo's brother, the couple had frequent conflicts and had broken up and reunited multiple times. He told investigators that he had witnessed Dominic calling Shirilla's parents to pick her up because she would not leave his home. A video Dominic Russo filmed days before the crash showed Shirilla threatening to break into his house and key his car.

Russo's mother, Christine, said about six months before the crash the relationship between Russo and Shirilla experienced tension again, including multiple claims of Shirilla severely abusing Russo. Two weeks prior to the crash, Russo had called his mother asking for help because Shirilla was driving erratically. She sent a family friend to pick Russo up, who later told police he heard Shirilla screaming: "I'm going to wreck this car right now!" and saw Shirilla hitting Russo with her hands.

== Car crash and investigation ==
On July 30, 2022, Shirilla, Russo, and Flanagan spent time together in the hours before the crash. At approximately 10 p.m., they attended a graduation party held at the house of Kelly Vraja, one of Shirilla's friends, they stayed for 20 minutes. They went home. At 11:29 p.m., the trio drove to the house of their friend Paul Burlinghaus, where they listened to music and smoked marijuana (except Mackenzie). They stayed there until early morning on July 31, leaving at 5:30 a.m.

At 5:34 a.m., a CCTV camera captured Shirilla's 2018 Toyota Camry slowly turning right from Pearl Road onto Progress Drive. One minute later, a second camera captured the car speeding with lights on at the end of Progress Drive. It crossed the T-split with Alameda Drive, and into the Plidco building, with the passenger side of the vehicle colliding with a corner of the structure. On the 2022 Google Earth Street View, the impact site could still be seen as a blue plastic sheet covering the wall. The car hit a top speed of 100 miles per hour (160 km/h), but was stuck at 72 miles per hour when it crashed.

First responders arrived at the scene 45 minutes after the crash to find Russo, Flanagan, and Shirilla unconscious. Shirilla was taken to a nearby hospital while Russo and Flanagan were pronounced dead at the scene. Police found 6.91g psilocybin mushrooms and a digital scale in Shirilla's possession.

Russo was sitting in the passenger seat of the vehicle at the time of the crash, with Flanagan sitting in the back. Responding officers are audible on body camera footage, one saying the car "split in two" and another describing it as the "worst" car crash that he had ever seen. Shirilla was severely injured and suffered multiple bone fractures. She was airlifted to a hospital where she underwent multiple surgeries. Witnesses said that she was "inconsolable" when she learned Russo and Flanagan died.

Shirilla posted multiple videos about her time in the hospital, showing the interior of the medical ward. The popularity of her account peaked during her stay in the hospital. Shirilla showed videos of her sitting in a wheelchair.

The Halloween after the crash, Shirilla and her friends posted to social media, posing in face paint that made them resemble corpses (this was later corrected as they were dressed as rapper Playboi Carti). Flanagan's sister thought Shirilla's behavior to be callous so soon after the deaths of her friends, and raised her suspicions about the events. The victims' families requested that the police investigate the matter more closely.

Police initially thought the crash was an accident or possibly had happened due to tampering with the vehicle. However, an auto expert found the vehicle was in perfect working condition before the crash. The onboard computer systems indicated the accelerator was being pressed at the time of the crash, with no use of the brakes.

When interrogated, Shirilla claimed she had blacked out during the crash and had no memories of the incident. Her lawyer claimed that Shirilla suffered from POTS, a blood-circulation condition that can cause momentary blackouts.

However, police soon began to believe she had intentionally crashed her vehicle. At her trial, the prosecutor noted that the vehicle had passed through a slight right/left "dogleg" intersection at high speed before the crash, which required conscious steering action by somebody able to reach the wheel. They believed her intention in crashing the car was to commit murder–suicide because she did not want Russo to break up with her again. The police tracked GPS data from her devices and discovered she had been in the area of the crash at least seven times.

== Arrest, trial and incarceration ==
By November 4, 2022, the police had gathered enough evidence to arrest Shirilla shortly after her discharge from the hospital. She was charged with 17 crimes, including two counts of aggravated murder and one count of drug trafficking.

Shirilla, based on the recommendation of her lawyer, chose a bench trial, in which a judge determines a person's guilt, rather than a jury trial. On August 14, 2023, Shirilla was found guilty by the Cuyahoga County Court of Common Pleas on charges of murder, felonious assault, aggravated vehicular homicide, drug possession, and criminal tools possession. Judge Nancy Margaret Russo (no relation to Dominic Russo) said that Shirilla's actions were premeditated, calling her "hell on wheels". Prosecutors said Shirilla had no remorse and used social media videos of her dancing on Halloween as evidence.

On August 21, 2023, the sentencing phase of the trial began. Davyne Flanagan, the sister of Davion Flanagan, asked the court to give Shirilla "the longest possible sentence". Christine Russo, Dominic Russo's mother, told Shirilla that she should be "thankful" she is still alive and has a future. Shirilla was sentenced to life in prison with the possibility of parole in 15 years. She received two life sentences, one each for the murders of Russo and Flanagan, to be served concurrently. The judge also permanently suspended her driver's license. After the sentencing, Cuyahoga County Prosecutor's Office released a statement saying that the murder was premeditated and that Shirilla intentionally drove the car at 5:30 a.m. due to the streets being relatively quiet in the late night and early morning hours.

On September 25, 2023, Shirilla's legal team filed an appeal, alleging that there was not enough evidence in the trial for the convictions and that multiple clerical errors were made during the trial. The appeal was denied.

They filed a second appeal on April 24, 2025. Judge Russo also denied this appeal due to it being filed untimely.

In March 2026, the Eighth District Court of Appeals upheld Judge Russo's decision to deny her appeal. Shirilla is currently incarcerated at the Ohio Reformatory for Women. Shirilla will be eligible for parole in October 2037.

== Legacy ==
Shortly after the news of the crash, friends of Russo and Flanagan created a small memorial near the crash site to show their support. The family of Davion Flanagan later created the Davion Flanagan Memorial Scholarship to provide educational support to "aspiring barbers" to honor his intention of becoming a barber.

== Representation in other media ==
Various companies and streaming services have made documentaries about the case. It was featured in a podcast titled Hell on Wheels on YouTube, Court TV made a documentary about the murders on YouTube, and several videos detailing the case were also uploaded to the platform.

True crime series Killer Cases analyzed the case in season 4, episode 12 of the series, which aired on Channel 4 and Apple TV. It was also featured in a documentary by Investigation Discovery in 2025.

A documentary titled The Crash began streaming on Netflix on May 15, 2026.

=== Interviews ===
On May 22, 2025, Shirilla's parents were interviewed for the first time by WKYC. They said they believed the crash was unintentional.

On May 14, 2026, Shirilla's father told NBC News that they believe she is innocent and was "falsely accused of something." He said there was insufficient evidence to convict her of murder and she should have instead been charged with vehicular homicide. Shirilla's mother said their daughter did not receive a fair trial because her lawyer did not use all the information the family provided to defend her. Nor did he call on any of the witnesses he originally told the Shirilla's he had.

Mackenzie Shirilla appears in the documentary The Crash, interviewed by creators Gareth Johnson and Angharad Scott. Her lawyer was present, and she repeated her previous claim of not being able to remember the incident. She said, "I have no recollection of that morning, but I know nothing about it was intentional, because that's not in my character". Shirilla also claimed that she had no intention of causing the accident, saying she was not innocent, but not a murderer either.
