= J. B. Carroll =

J. B. Carroll may refer to:

- Joe Barry Carroll (born 1958), American basketball player
- John Bissell Carroll (1916–2003), American psychologist

== See also ==
- Carroll (surname)
