= Jason Carroll =

Jason Carroll may refer to:

- Jason Carroll (journalist), American journalist
- Jason Carroll (researcher), British cancer researcher
- Jason Michael Carroll (born 1978), American country music artist
