= Murder of Jailyn Candelario =

2023 filicide of a 16-month-old girl in Cleveland, Ohio

- Location: Cleveland, Ohio, U.S.
- Date: June 2023; 3 years ago
- Attack type: Child murder by starvation and dehydration, torture murder, filicide
- Victims: Jailyn Candelario, aged 1
- Perpetrator: Kristel Candelario
- Motive: Abandonment to go on vacation
- Verdict: Pleaded guilty
- Convictions: Aggravated murder, child endangerment
- Sentence: Life imprisonment without the possibility of parole

In June 2023, Jailyn Candelario, a 16-month-old American girl from Cleveland, Ohio, was murdered in her home by her mother Kristel Candelario, who had left her abandoned for ten days while vacationing in Puerto Rico and Detroit.

== Background ==
Neighbors recounted that Candelario had a history of abandoning her child; one reported that in one instance they had agreed to take care of Jailyn for the weekend, which turned into a month and a half, with Candelario refusing to answer the phone or pick up Jailyn. It was later reported that Candelario had left Jailyn alone for two days in the home just prior to the trip that began on June 6.

== Death ==
On June 6, 2023, Kristel Candelario left Jailyn alone and unattended at their home in West Boulevard, Cleveland, and did not return until June 16, 2023, early in the morning. Candelario had left Jailyn with a few bottles of milk alone in the home in her playpen. A neighbor's doorbell camera recorded Jailyn screaming multiple times including early in the morning about two days after Candelario had left. Candelario posted on social media during her time out of the state, posting a picture of herself smiling, barefoot on a beach captioned with; "The time that is enjoyed is the true time lived."

Upon her discovery Jailyn was found to be extremely dehydrated and was found in a play pen that consisted of soiled blankets and a bottom liner that was saturated with urine and feces. Kristel reportedly called 911, and prior to first responders arriving at the home, Candelario had changed Jailyn into a clean outfit. Responding Cleveland Division of Police found Jailyn unresponsive with medics pronouncing her dead at the scene, and noted that her appearance was emaciated with sunken eyes, dry lips and fecal matter in her mouth and under her fingernails. Excluding that Jailyn had been left alone for 10 days, she otherwise showed no signs of physical trauma according to the Cuyahoga County Medical Examiners office. Her death was determined to be due to starvation and severe dehydration, and she weighed seven pounds less than she had at a doctor's visit in April 2023.

== Legal proceedings ==
After Jailyn's autopsy, Candelario was charged with murder, with prosecutors not ruling out the possibility of the death penalty. Candelario pled guilty to two counts, aggravated murder and child endangerment, as part of a plea deal in February 2024. Additional charges of felonious assault and two murder counts were dismissed as part of the plea deal. Her attorney stated that she had struggled with mental health issues and had attempted to kill herself in 2023, which resulted in a prescription of antidepressants that she chose to stop taking shortly before abandoning Jailyn.

Candelario's parents claimed in court proceedings that they were unaware of the abandonment of Jailyn and asked the judge for mercy in sentencing, claiming that Candelario's ability to make sound decisions was impeded by medication prescribed to control her mental health. Candelario echoed their statement, claiming she never told them about the trip, and had told her parents, who were caring for her older daughter, that she was staying home with Jailyn.

On March 18, 2024, Candelario was sentenced to life in prison without the possibility of parole. She is currently incarcerated at the Ohio Reformatory for Women in Marysville, Ohio.
