= O'Carroll (surname) =

O'Carroll is an Irish surname. Notable people who use this name include:

== Surnames ==
- Brendan O'Carroll (born 1955), Irish actor, comedian, director, producer and writer
- Daniel O'Carroll (died 1713), British army officer
- Diarmuid O'Carroll (born 1987), Irish footballer
- Eamon O'Carroll (born 1987), Irish rugby footballer
- Fintan O'Carroll (1922–1981) (also known by his Irish name Fiontán P Ó Cearbhaill), Irish composer
- Gay O'Carroll (born 1964), Irish footballer
- John O'Carroll (born 1958), British artist
- Joseph O'Carroll (1891–1965), Australian politician
- Maggie O'Carroll, British business leader
- Michael O'Carroll (1911–2004), Irish motoring expert and TV/radio/newspaper correspondent
- Paddy O'Carroll (hurler) (1866–1960), Irish hurler
- Paddy O'Carroll (swimmer) (fl. 1986), New Zealand swimmer
- Richard O'Carroll (1876–1916), Irish patriot and union Leader
- Rory O'Carroll (born 1989), Irish footballer and hurler
- Ross O'Carroll (born 1987), Irish hurling and football player
- Sinéad O'Carroll (born 1973), Irish singer and businesswoman
- Susie O'Carroll, Irish sportsperson
- Tom O'Carroll (born 1945), British writer and paedophilia advocate
- William Augustine O'Carroll (1831–1885), Irish nationalist, radical liberal, journalist and Queensland newspaper editor

== Fictional ==
- Ross O'Carroll-Kelly, Irish character in various works by Paul Howard

== See also ==
- Carroll (surname)
- McCarroll
- O'Carroll, Irish clan
