= Tiffany Yu =

Entrepreneur and disability rights advocate (born 1988)

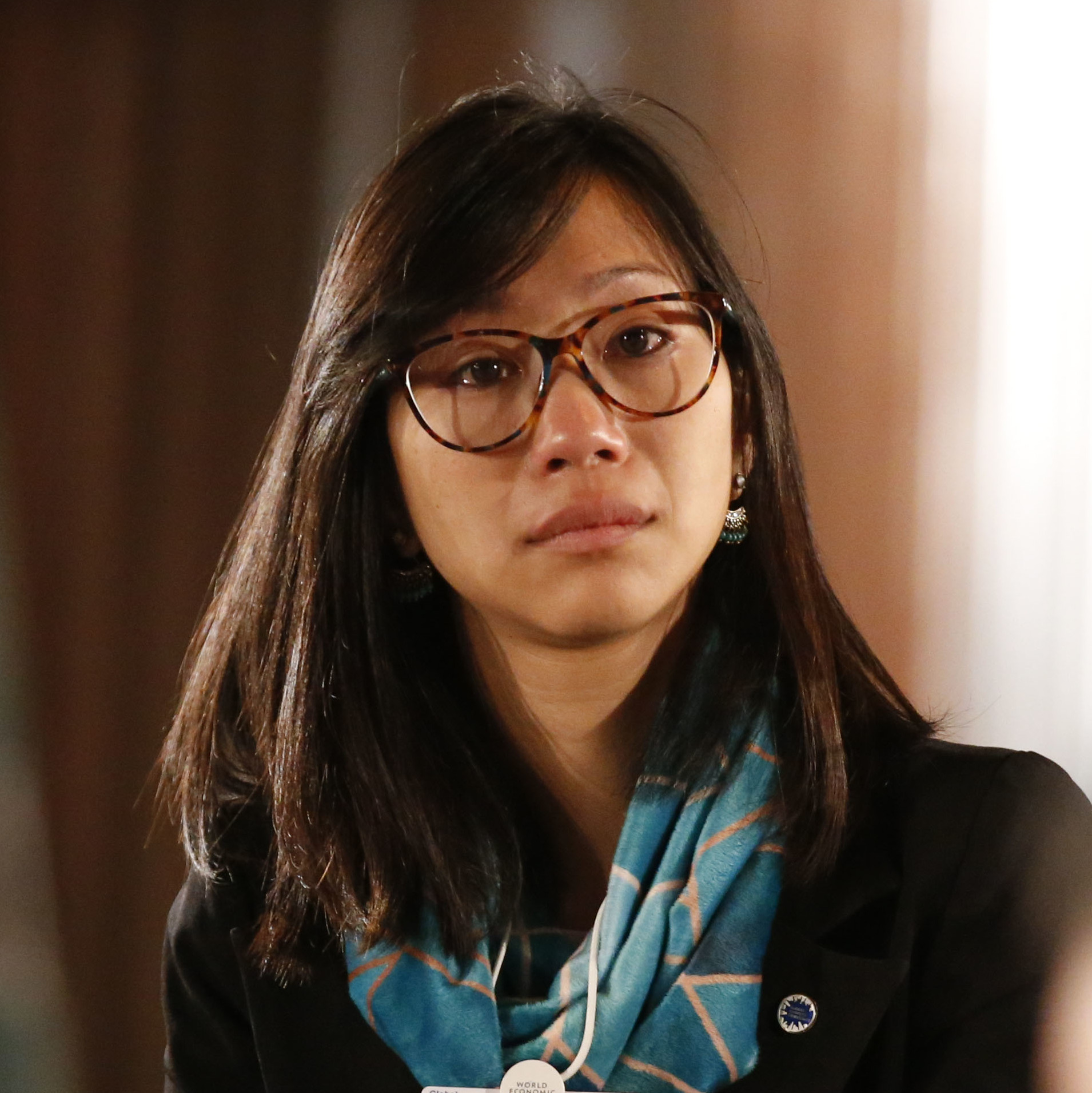
- Tiffany Yu (2018)
- Born: 1988 (age 37–38)
- Education: Georgetown University

Tiffany Yu (born 1988) is an American entrepreneur and disability rights advocate who founded Diversability, which is a social enterprise to advocate for equality for people with disabilities.

== Early life and education ==
Yu was raised in Bethesda, Maryland. At age nine, she became disabled in a car accident that left her with a permanent brachial plexus injury. The accident also resulted in the death of her father. As a result of the accident, Yu developed post-traumatic stress disorder.

Yu graduated from Georgetown College at Georgetown University in 2010.

== Activism ==
In 2009, while studying at Georgetown University, Yu founded Diversability, a social enterprise whose mission is to change the stigma surrounding disabilities and create community. After graduation from Georgetown, Yu continued to run Diversability as she worked at companies including Goldman Sachs, Bloomberg, and Revolt (TV network), and in 2016, she won the Guardian's "My Side Hustle Wins" contest for her work with Diversability.

Yu serves on the Leadership Committee for the Paul K. Longmore Institute's Disability Cultural Center in San Francisco. She was also awarded the Bell Greve Award from the National Rehabilitation Association in 2015. Yu was a speaker at the 2018 World Economic Forum in Davos as part of the "We Need to Talk About" series and named a World Economic Forum Global Shaper. She is also a three-time TEDx speaker.

Yu was the 2019 California Miss Amazing Queen. In 2021, she donated $50,000 to Georgetown University to launch an endowment fund for disability inclusion-related initiatives and disability advocacy. Yu also engages in social media activism on TikTok, Twitter, and Instagram. Yu is also the founder of the Disability chapter of Awesome Foundation.

In 2024, Yu's first book, The Anti-Ableist Manifesto:Smashing Stereotypes, Forging Change, and Building a Disability-Inclusive World was published by Hachette Go.
