= Michael Carroll =

Michael or Mike Carroll may refer to:

- Michael B. Carroll (born 1962), Pennsylvania politician
- Michael Carroll (American football), American football coach in the United States
- Michael Carroll (American writer), American writer
- Michael Carroll (Irish writer) (born 1966), Irish author
- Michael Carroll (Gaelic footballer), for Donegal
- Michael Carroll (lottery winner) (born 1983), English National Lottery winner
- Michael Patrick Carroll (born 1958), New Jersey assemblyman
- Michael Carroll, photojournalist and subject of the documentary film Hand Held
- Michael Carroll (space artist), astronomical artist and science writer
- Michael W. Carroll, American legal academic
- Mike Carroll (footballer) (born 1952), Scottish footballer
- Mike Carroll (skateboarder) (born 1975), American skateboarder
- Mike Carroll (politician), California politician

== See also ==
- Mick Carroll, guitarist in Mr Floppy
- Mickey Carroll (1919–2009), American actor in The Wizard of Oz
