= James Carroll =

James or Jim Carroll may refer to:

== Arts and entertainment ==
- Jim Carroll (1949–2009), American author, poet and punk musician
- James Carroll (actor) (1956–2016), American-born Canadian actor and radio personality
- Jim Carroll (futurist) (born 1959), Canadian futurist, author, and keynote speaker
- Jim Carroll (journalist) (born 1968), Irish music journalist and broadcaster

== Law and politics ==
=== United States ===
- James Carroll (Maryland politician) (1791–1873), American politician
- James Bernard Carroll (1856–1932), American jurist in Massachusetts
- James T. Carroll (New York politician) (1875–1940), American politician in New York
- James H. Carroll (c. 1876–1950), American politician
- James T. Carroll (California politician) (1877–1939), American politician in Los Angeles
- Jim Carroll (Vermont politician) (born 1961), American politician in Vermont
- James W. Carroll, American politician, senior White House staffer

=== Others in law and politics ===
- James Carroll (Australian politician) (1855–1927), Australian politician
- James Carroll (New Zealand politician) (1857–1926), New Zealand politician
- James Carroll (Dublin politician) (1907–1973), Irish independent politician
- James Carroll (Louth politician) (born 1983), Irish Fianna Fáil Senator from Louth

== Sports ==
- James Carroll (cricketer) (1843–1926), English cricketer
- Jim Carroll (Australian footballer) (born 1939), Australian rules footballer
- Jim Carroll (American football) (born 1943), American football linebacker

== Others ==
- James Rawson Carroll (1830–1911), Irish architect
- James Carroll (captain) (1840–1912), Irish American steamship captain
- James Milton Carroll (1852–1931), American Baptist pastor, leader, historian, and author
- James Carroll (scientist) (1854–1907), American scientist
- James Marmion Gilmor Carroll (1884–1962), Anglo-Irish Roman Catholic and businessman
- James Carroll (author) (born 1943), American author, novelist, Roman Catholic dissident, and columnist for the Boston Globe

== See also ==
- James Carroll Beckwith (1852–1917), American portrait painter
- James Booker (James Carroll Booker, 1939–1983), American musician
