= Pat Carroll (disambiguation) =

Pat Carroll (1927–2022) was an American actress.

Pat Carroll may also refer to:

- Pat Carroll (baseball) (1853–1916), American Major League Baseball catcher
- Pat Carroll (basketball) (born 1982), American professional basketball player
- Pat Carroll (singer) (born 1946), Australian singer from the 1960s
- Pat Carroll (soccer) (born 1985), American soccer player
- Pat Carroll (hurler) (1956–1986), Irish hurler
- Pat Carroll (runner) (born 1961), Australian long-distance runner
- Patrick J. Carroll, English actor
- Patrick Joseph Carroll (1903–1975), Irish soldier and police commissioner.
- M. Patrick Carroll (born 1979), American businessman
- Patrick Carroll (politician), New York politician

== See also ==
- Patty Carroll (born 1946), American photographer
