= Edward Carroll =

Edward Carroll may refer to:

- Edward Gonzalez Carroll (1910–2000), American bishop of the United Methodist Church
- Edward Carroll (musician) (born 1953), American trumpeter
- Edward C. Carroll (1893–1969; Edward Christopher Carroll), American politician in the Massachusetts Senate
- E. J. Carroll (1874–1931; Edward John Carroll), Australian theatre and film producer
- Ted Carroll (footballer) (born 1955), Australian rules footballer
