= Donna Roberts =

American murderer and former death row inmate

Donna Marie Roberts
- Mugshot
- Born: May 22, 1944 (age 82); Youngstown, Ohio, U.S.
- Spouse(s): William Raymond (1966-1971); Burton Gelfand (1972-1980, deceased 2010); Robert Fingerhut (1983-1985, deceased 2001)
- Children: Michael Raymond
- Parent(s): Michael Roberts; Pauline Terrago
- Status: Incarcerated at Ohio Reformatory for Women in Marysville, Ohio.
- Convictions: Complicity to aggravated murder Complicity to aggravated burglary Complicity to aggravated robbery
- Penalty: Death, commuted to life without parole

Donna Marie Roberts (born May 22, 1944) is an American woman who was convicted of aiding and abetting murder and was on death row in the State of Ohio. Her co-defendant Nathaniel Jackson was also sentenced to death. The two conspired together to kill Roberts' husband Robert Fingerhut at his Howland Township home in 2001.

== Early life ==
Roberts was born and raised in Youngstown, Ohio and was a student of Austintown Fitch High School. She enrolled at Youngstown State University for two years, and in 1966, she married her first husband, William Raymond, and moved to Miami, Florida. She had one child, Michael Raymond, in 1969. She and William Raymond divorced in 1971. She married her second husband, Burton Gelfand, in 1972 and later divorced him in 1980. Roberts converted to Judaism while living in Miami, Florida, and worked as a plastic surgeon assistant for over 20 years in North Miami Beach. Roberts met her late husband, Robert Fingerhut, in 1980. They married and bought a home in Miami, near Miami Gardens and Ives Estates in 1983. They later sold their home and moved to Richmond, Virginia for one year, and in 1993, the couple moved back to Roberts' hometown of Youngstown, Ohio. Roberts purchased their new home in Warren in 1994 on Fonderlac Avenue. During this time, Roberts and Fingerhut managed the Avis Car Rental franchise at the Youngstown–Warren Regional Airport for several years. They later managed both the Youngstown and Warren Greyhound bus stations and turned them into successful locations. For a short period, Roberts also ran a small restaurant located within the Youngstown Bus Terminal called "Just the Ticket."

== Murder conviction ==
Roberts was convicted in 2003 of complicity in aggravated murder and conspiracy to commit murder. Roberts was having an affair with Nathaniel E. Jackson before he was sent to prison for a separate offense. While Jackson was still in prison, he stated in letters and phone calls that he would kill her ex-husband, Robert Fingerhut, which he did on December 11, 2001, in the house Roberts and Fingerhut shared. In Roberts' appeal, it was alleged that the police performed an illegal search of her car parked inside the garage since the search warrant was only for the home. Jackson stated that Roberts had no knowledge of his planned actions, videotaped during his confession by the police; he also stated this during his trial. Jackson was sentenced to death for his role in the murder. In addition to phone calls and letters between Roberts and Jackson, investigators said Roberts bought Jackson a mask and gloves to wear while committing the crime, even allowing him into the home where the murder occurred.

On June 25, 2020, the Ohio Supreme Court ruled that carrying out the execution of Roberts would be placed on hold until all state post conviction proceedings, including any appeals are exhausted. In May 2025, Nathaniel Jackson's death sentence was vacated and is now set for a new sentencing hearing. As of December 2025, both Roberts and Jackson have had their sentences commuted to life without parole.

== In the media ==
In the years since their conviction, Roberts and Jackson's case has been featured on Deadly Women, Snapped: Killer Couples, Calls From the Inside, Season 2, and For My Man.

== See also ==
- Capital punishment in Ohio
- List of women on death row in the United States
