= Matt Carroll =

Matt Carroll may refer to:

- Matt Carroll (basketball) (born 1980), American basketball player
- Matt Carroll (producer) (born 1944), Australian film and television producer
- Matt Carroll (lacrosse), lacrosse player for the Toronto Rock of the NLL
- Matt Carroll (sports administrator), Australian sports administrator
- Matt Carroll (footballer) (born 2005), Australian footballer for Carlton

== See also ==
- Carroll (surname)
