= William Benton (writer) =

American writer, poet and novelist

- Born: 1939 (age 86–87)
- Occupations: Poet; novelist

Academic work
- Institutions: Pacific Northwest College of Art

William Benton (born 1939) is an American writer, poet, and novelist. He has published multiple volumes of poetry, including Birds, Marmalade, and Backlit. Madly, a novel, was published in 2005. His nonfiction work includes the book Exchanging Hats, on the paintings of poet Elizabeth Bishop and co-editing the book Gods of Tin: The Flying Years about James Salter.

== Literary career ==
Benton's first poetry collection Birds was published in 1972 as a limited edition, and later in further editions, in 2002 and 2020. His poetry has also appeared in The New Yorker, The Paris Review, and other periodicals.

Benton has also published books about art. He is the editor of the 1996 book Exchanging Hats, a curated collection of artwork by the poet Elizabeth Bishop. In a Chicago Tribune review, Penelope Mesic writes, "Until now, the world has known Bishop by her poems, so crystalline, exact, complete and unpretentious that many regard her as the premier poet of her generation." In a New York Times review, John Russell wrote, "when we close the book, we know what Meyer Schapiro meant when he said that Bishop wrote poems with a painter's eye. It was for their editor, William Benton, to coax them out of hiding, and he did a very good job."

Benton co-edited Gods of Tin: The Flying Years, which is a collection of works by James Salter and described in a review by Publishers Weekly as "a splendid thing in a small package". Benton also wrote the introduction to the book. His novel Madly was published in 2005. Lacy Crawford wrote in Narrative Magazine, “The novel is itself a poetic meditation on how desire attempts to shape the world. Its diction and imagery are startling.” It was described as "An uneven love story, with poetic moments" by Kirkus Reviews. A review for Library Journal recommends the novel for large fiction collections, and states, "the elegance of Benton's poetic language is engaging, but it never quite compensates for this novel's slow pacing." He also wrote the book, music, and lyrics for the musical theater showcase production "Out of the Blue", which was panned by The New York Times in 1999.

== Personal life ==
As of 2022, he lives in New York City.

== Published works ==
- The Bell Poems (poetry, 1970)
- Birds (poetry, 1972)
- Eye La View (poetry, 1975)
- L'Aprè-Midi D'un Faune (poetry, int. by Guy Davenport, limited edition, 1976)
- Normal Meanings (poetry, 1978)
- Marmalade (poetry, limited edition, with original prints by James McGarrell, 1993)
- Exchanging Hats: Elizabeth Bishop Paintings (art, 1996)
- Out of the Blue (play; music, lyrics and book, New York production, 1999)
- Deaf Elephants (children's book, 2001)
- Birds (expanded edition, 2002)
- Gods of Tin (ed., 2004)
- Madly (novel, 2005)
- A Quatrain on Sleeping Beauty's Tomb (trans.,2011)
- The Mary Julia Paintings of Joan Brown (art, 2016)
- Backlit (poetry, 2017)
- Eye Contact (art, 2018)
- Birds (poetry, 3rd edition, 2020)
- Reliquaries, The Sculpture of Ted Waltz (art, 2020)
- Light on Water, New and Selected Poems, 1972–2022
- Eye La View (poetry, 2nd edition, 2025)
- Marmalade (poetry, 2nd edition, 2025)

=== In periodicals ===
- The New Yorker, "Dinner", 1997
- The New Yorker, "Camera Obscura", 1999
- The Paris Review No. 155, Summer 2000, "Two Poems"
- The Paris Review No. 160, Winter 2001, "Two Poems"
- Benton, William (3 November 2011). "Elizabeth Bishop: Exchanging Hats – in pictures". The Guardian.
- Elizabeth Bishop’s Other Art, 2011 article by Benton at The New York Review of Books
- The New Yorker, "Marcel Proust on What Writing Is" , 2023
- "The Paris Review", "Close Formation, My Friendship with James Salter 2025
