= David Carroll =

David Carroll may refer to:

- David Carroll (actor) (1950–1992), American actor
- David Carroll (biker) (1952–????), Canadian gangster
- David Carroll (musician) (1913–2008), American composer and musical director
- Dave Carroll (musician), musician in Sons of Maxwell
- David Carroll (naturalist) (born 1942), American naturalist author and illustrator
- David Carroll (physicist) (born 1963), American physicist
- David Williamson Carroll (1816–1905), colonel in the Confederate Army and member of the Congress of the Confederate States of America
- Dave Carroll (born 1966), Scottish footballer
- David Carroll, who pleaded guilty to the murder of his foster son Marcus Fiesel
- David Carroll, a fictional detective created by Octavus Roy Cohen in the 1920s
- David Carroll, American professor and whistleblower; see Emerdata
