= Tommy Carroll =

Tommy Carroll may refer to:

- Tommy Carroll (artist), Aboriginal Australian artist at Warmun Art Centre, Turkey Creek, Western Australia
- Tommy Carroll (criminal) (1901–1934), American bank robber and depression-era outlaw
- Tommy Carroll (footballer) (1942–2020), Irish international footballer
- Tommy Carroll (hurler) (1898–1979), Irish hurler

== See also ==
- Thomas Carroll (disambiguation)
