= Peter Carroll =

Peter Carroll may refer to:

- Pete Carroll (born 1951), American football coach
- Peter Carroll (actor) (born 1944), Australian actor
- Peter Carroll (rugby league) (born 1932), Australian rugby league player
- Peter Carroll (sportsman) (born 1941), Australian cricketer and rugby union player
- Peter J. Carroll (1953–2026), English occultist and writer
- Peter James Carroll (born 1956), English writer, poet and TV producer known as Henry Normal

== See also ==
- Pete Carril (1930–2022), American basketball coach
- Peter Carrell (born 1959), New Zealand Anglican bishop
