= Nicole Diar =

American murderer

- Born: July 21, 1975 (age 51); Ohio, U.S.
- Children: Jacob
- Status: Incarcerated at Ohio Reformatory for Women in Marysville, Ohio.
- Convictions: Aggravated murder Aggravated arson Felonious assault Tampering with evidence
- Penalty: Death; commuted to life imprisonment

Nicole Diar (born July 21, 1975) is an American woman convicted of the August 27, 2003, murder of her 4-year-old son, Jacob. Prosecutors argued that Diar suffocated her son before setting the house on fire, though the exact cause of Jacob's death was never determined because his body was too badly burned. The jury sentenced her to death. In 2008, the Ohio Supreme Court upheld her conviction but overturned the sentence on the basis that the jury was not informed that a single vote could prevent her from receiving the death penalty. On June 3, 2010, she was sentenced to life in prison without parole.

Nicole Diar was convicted in 2005 of charges she killed her 4-year-old son, Jacob Diar. Jacob Diar's burned remains were found inside of their house in Lorain, Ohio after a house fire that occurred in 2003. Nicole Diar was able to run out of the house to safety but her son was left inside. Diar claimed she tried to save her son from his upstairs bedroom but the smoke was too much. The officers that morning said Diar did not have any soot or smell strongly of smoke as she would if she had tried to save her son during the fire. Jacob's autopsy could not determine cause of death but did suggest that he died before the fire was started due to the lack of soot and evidence of smoke inhalation in his lungs. Judge Kosma Glavas sentenced Diar to the death penalty after it was suggested by the Ohio jury in October 2005. The Ohio Supreme Court overturned her death sentence in 2008 because the Jury was not told ahead of time that just one of them could have changed her death sentence by refusing to consider execution.

== In popular culture ==
Diar's crimes were profiled on the Investigation Discovery series Deadly Women, episode "Bury Their Babies", originally aired: November 2, 2012.

Also the focus of story 2 of episode 23 of the "Radio Rental" podcast.

== See also ==
- List of women on death row in the United States
