= McCardell =

McCardell is a surname. Notable people with the surname include:

- A. LeRoy McCardell (1873–1945), American politician and banker from Maryland
- Archie McCardell (1926–2008), American businessman
- Claire McCardell (1905–1958), American fashion designer
- John McCardell, Jr. (born 1949), American academic
- Keenan McCardell (born 1970), American football player
- Roger McCardell (1932–1996), American baseball player
- Roy McCardell (1870-?), American journalist and humorist
- Sandra McCardell, Canadian diplomat

== See also ==
- Chloe McCardel (born 1985), Australian long-distance swimmer
- McCarrell
