= Bell Greve =

American social worker

- Bell Greve, from a 1941 newspaper
- Born: January 4, 1894; Chicago, Illinois, US
- Died: January 9, 1957 (aged 63); Cleveland Heights, Ohio, US
- Occupation: Social worker

Bell Greve (January 4, 1894 – January 9, 1957) was an American social worker, based in Cleveland, Ohio.

== Early life ==
Bell Greve was born in Chicago and raised Cleveland, Ohio, the daughter of Louis John Greve and Margaret Rummel Greve. Her mother was born in Germany.

Greve attended Hiram College, and graduated from Flora Stone Mather College, the women's college at Western Reserve University. She earned a law degree at Cleveland Law School.

== Career ==
Greve was a social worker based in Cleveland. After World War I, she worked with the Red Cross, assigned to direct a children's clinic in Hodonín, Czechoslovakia, and an orphanage in Alexandropol, Armenia. She returned to Ohio and became a state official overseeing charities in the Department of Public Welfare. In 1929, she moved to West Virginia, to direct the Community Chest program in Charleston.

Greve returned to Ohio again in 1933, to direct the city's Association for the Crippled and Disabled (later the Cleveland Rehabilitation Center), a position she held for twenty years. During her tenure, the Association opened a playroom for disabled children in 1934 and a vocational program for disabled adults. She was also director of the Cuyahoga County Relief Bureau from 1937 until 1944. From 1953, she was head of the Cleveland Department of Health and Welfare. She also served on the Ohio state board of the American Cancer Society.

On the international scene, Greve was one of the organizers of the 1936 World Congress for Workers for the Crippled, held in Budapest. From 1941 to 1951, she was secretary-general of the International Society for the Welfare of Cripples. In 1948 she organized conference on rehabilitation in Mexico City, for specialists in North America and South America. 1949 she organized and spoke at an international conference on rehabilitation in Honolulu. She was a leader of Rehabilitation International (now RI Global) in the 1940s, working with Henry H. Kessler. She worked on rehabilitation programs in Mexico and the Caribbean, and in Greece after World War II.

== Personal life ==
Greve died in 1957, a few days after her 63rd birthday, at a hospital in Cleveland Heights.

== Bell Greve Memorial Award ==
The Bell Greve Memorial Award is presented annually by the National Rehabilitation Association, "to a person who has shown unusual initiative or creativity in developing and administering a service program for people with disabilities." Notable recipients have included Thomas J. Carroll (1980) and Tiffany Yu (2015).
