= McCarrell =

McCarrell is a surname.

== Surname ==
- Chris McCarrell (born 1991), American actor and singer
- Nicholas McCarrell (born 1982), known as Aqua, American record producer and composer

== Middle name ==
- Alexander McCarrell Patch, known as Alexander Patch (1889 – 1945), American Army general
- Marion McCarrell Scott (1843 - 1922), American educator and government advisor

== See also ==
- Carrell
- Mac Cearbhaill
- McCardell
- Graeme McCarrel
- McCarroll
- McGarrell
