= McCarroll =

McCarroll is a surname. Notable people with the surname include:

- Bonnie McCarroll (1897–1929), American rodeo performer
- Jay McCarroll (born 1974), American fashion designer
- June McCarroll (1867–1954), American nurse
- Tony McCarroll (born 1971), English drummer

== See also ==
- Carroll (surname)
- McCarrell
- O'Carroll (surname)
- McCarroll Peak, a mountain in Antarctica
- Mac Cearbhaill, a Gaelic Irish clan
