= Thomas Carroll =

Thomas Carroll or Tom Carroll may refer to:

== Sports ==
- Thomas Carroll (cricketer) (1884–1957), Australian cricketer
- Tom Carroll (hurler) (fl. 1880s), Irish hurler
- Thomas Carroll (martial artist) (1938–1999), American martial artist
- Tom Carroll (Australian footballer) (born 1939), Australian footballer
- Tom Carroll (English footballer) (born 1992), English footballer
- Tom Carroll (infielder) (1936–2021), American baseball infielder
- Tom Carroll (pitcher) (born 1952), American baseball pitcher
- Tom Carroll (surfer) (born 1961), Australian surfer
- Thomas Carroll (hurler) (born 1992), Irish hurler
- Tom Carroll (pole vaulter) (born 1928), pole vaulter also known as Jack Carroll

== Other ==
- Thomas King Carroll (1793–1873), governor of Maryland
- Thomas Carroll (pilot) (1890–1975), American test pilot at NACA, precursor to NASA
- Thomas H. Carroll (1914–1964), president of George Washington University
- Thomas J. Carroll (1909–1971), Catholic priest and civil rights activist
- Thomas Carroll (Greek Orthodox priest), Irish priest in the Greek Orthodox Church

== See also ==
- Tommy Carroll (disambiguation)
