= Jason Carroll (researcher) =

British medical researcher

Jason Carroll FMedSci
- Education: University of Melbourne
- Awards: Fellow of the Academy of Medical Sciences
- Scientific career
- Workplaces: Cancer Research UK Cambridge Institute, University of Cambridge
- Website: www.cruk.cam.ac.uk/research-groups/carroll-group

Professor Jason Carroll FMedSci is a British medical researcher serving as Deputy Director and Senior Group Leader at the Cancer Research UK Cambridge Institute, University of Cambridge. He is a Professor of Molecular Oncology assigned to the Department of Oncology, co-lead of the Breast Cancer Programme at the Cancer Research UK Cambridge Centre and a Fellow of Clare College, Cambridge. He was Founder and Chief Scientific Officer of Azeria Therapeutics from 2017-2020.

== Education ==
Carroll completed his B.Sc Hons in Molecular Biology at the University of Melbourne before undertaking his PhD in Cancer Research at The Garvan Institute and University of New South Wales. He completed his postdoctoral training with Professor Myles Brown from 2002-2007 at Dana-Farber Cancer Institute, Harvard Medical School.

== Career ==
Carroll's research uses molecular, genomic and proteomic approaches to understand how the Estrogen Receptor causes gene transcription and how this contributes to breast cancer progression.

With Prof Myles Brown and Dr Shirley Liu, Carroll developed one of the first chromosome-wide and then genome-wide transcription factor mapping approaches, which was used to discover that Estrogen Receptor (ER) regulates genes from distal enhancers rather than promoter regions. This work also led to the discovery that FOXA1 is a pioneer factor for ER in breast cancer and subsequent work identified the role of FOXA1 in treatment resistance.

He developed the first approaches for mapping transcription factors by ChIP-seq in primary tumour tissue. He also developed the proteomic method RIME (Rapid Immunoprecipitation Mass Spectrometry of Endogenous proteins) for unbiased discovery of protein interactomes, which was used to discover an interaction between ER and Progesterone Receptor (PR), revealing the concept that PR activation could reprogram and inhibit ER activity in breast cancer. This fundamental discovery was validated in the PIONEER Phase II window-of-opportunity clinical trial, which showed that inclusion of a PR-targeted drug could improve anti-tumour activity in primary breast cancer patients.

Carroll also discovered the role of pioneer factor FOXA1 in breast cancer, demonstrating that it is key in enabling the estrogen receptor to interact with the DNA in breast cancer cells, switching on genes that trigger unchecked growth. In 2015, Carroll's work uncovered why women who have high levels of both the estrogen and progesterone receptors have a better chance of breast cancer survival, and found that adding progesterone at the same time as tamoxifen slows tumour growth in the laboratory.

In 2017, Carroll founded Azeria Therapeutics Limited to develop treatments for hormone resistant breast and prostate cancer, building on his work with pioneer factor FOXA1.

== Awards and honours ==
- British Association for Cancer Research Frank Rose Young Scientist of the Year Award, 2009
- EMBO Young Investigator Award, 2010
- Cancer Research UK Future Leaders Award, 2012
- AACR Outstanding Investigator Award, 2013
- Louis-Jeantet Young Investigator Career Award, 2014
- EMBO member, 2016
- Academy of Medical Sciences Fellow, 2017
