= Joe Carroll (priest) =

American Roman Catholic priest (1941–2021)

Father Joe Carroll
- Born: April 12, 1941; Bronx, New York, US
- Died: July 11, 2021 (aged 80); San Diego, California, US
- Other names: Father Joe, Hustler Priest
- Education: University of San Diego
- Years active: 1974–2011
- Known for: Homeless outreach and advocacy
- Religion: Roman Catholic
- Ordained: 1974

Father Joe Carroll (April 12, 1941 – July 11, 2021) was an American Roman Catholic priest who led a nonprofit in San Diego, "Father Joe's Villages and St. Vincent de Paul Center" that assists poor, impoverished, and homeless individuals.

== Biography ==
Father Joe Carroll grew up in the Bronx, with his parents and seven brothers and sisters, and was an altar boy and Boy Scout. As a child, Carroll lived across from St. Joseph Church. Carroll got his first job in a butcher shop at the age of 8, and would go on to sell Christmas trees and do laundry machine repairs to supplement income for his parents and siblings. As a Boy Scout, he achieved the rank of Life Scout. Carroll moved to California in his 20s. Initially enrolled at St. John's Seminary, in Ventura County; he was expelled for running the seminary's bookstore in a way which earned the bookstore profit after adding non-book merchandise to the bookstore. He completed his studies at the University of San Diego in 1974 and was ordained to the priesthood. While enrolled at the University of San Diego, he attended seminary school in Washington, D.C. That same year Carroll began to collect nativity sets, which at one point the collection reached 700 sets.

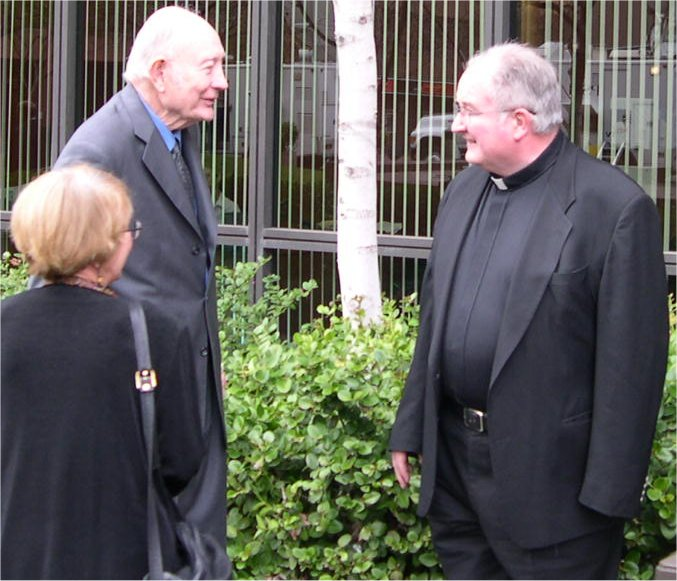
Carroll, on the right, speaking to former Representative Clair Burgener in 2006.

Carroll was assigned to a parish church, St. Rita, in Valencia Park. Given the choices by Bishop Leo Thomas Maher of transferring to a parish church in Needles, California, or becoming involved in St. Vincent de Paul, Carroll chose the latter. From 1982 to 2011, Carroll led St. Vincent de Paul Village. In 1984, Carroll appeared in a commercial seeking donations for St. Vincent de Paul which aired during the 1984 National League Championship Series, which gained him national notoriety. Carroll was featured in a 60 Minutes story in 1985, and a Reader's Digest story in 1988. Carroll's efforts to assist the homeless, drew criticism from the Wall Street Journal, and praise in the form of a World Habitat Award. In the 2000s, his organization made bobble-head dolls of him as a fundraising reward for donors. In 2011, Carroll retired.

After retiring from day-to-day operations of his organization, he continued to be active in fund-raising activities. In 2013, Carroll was honored for his efforts during an event in Washington, D.C., on National Medal of Honor Day. By 2017, Carroll had to have both his feet amputated due to complications with diabetes; that same year he began to use a wheelchair to get around. In 2019, Carroll was awarded an honorary Doctor of Humane Letters degree from San Diego State University. Due to the effects of his diabetes by 2021 Carroll had lost vision in his right eye. He celebrated his 80th birthday on April 12, 2021, with the release of his memoir, "Father Joe Life Stories of a Hustler Priest". In July 2021, Carroll died due to diabetes while receiving hospice care at his East Village home. A celebration of life was held for Carroll at the San Diego Convention Center in August 2021.

== Father Joe's Villages ==
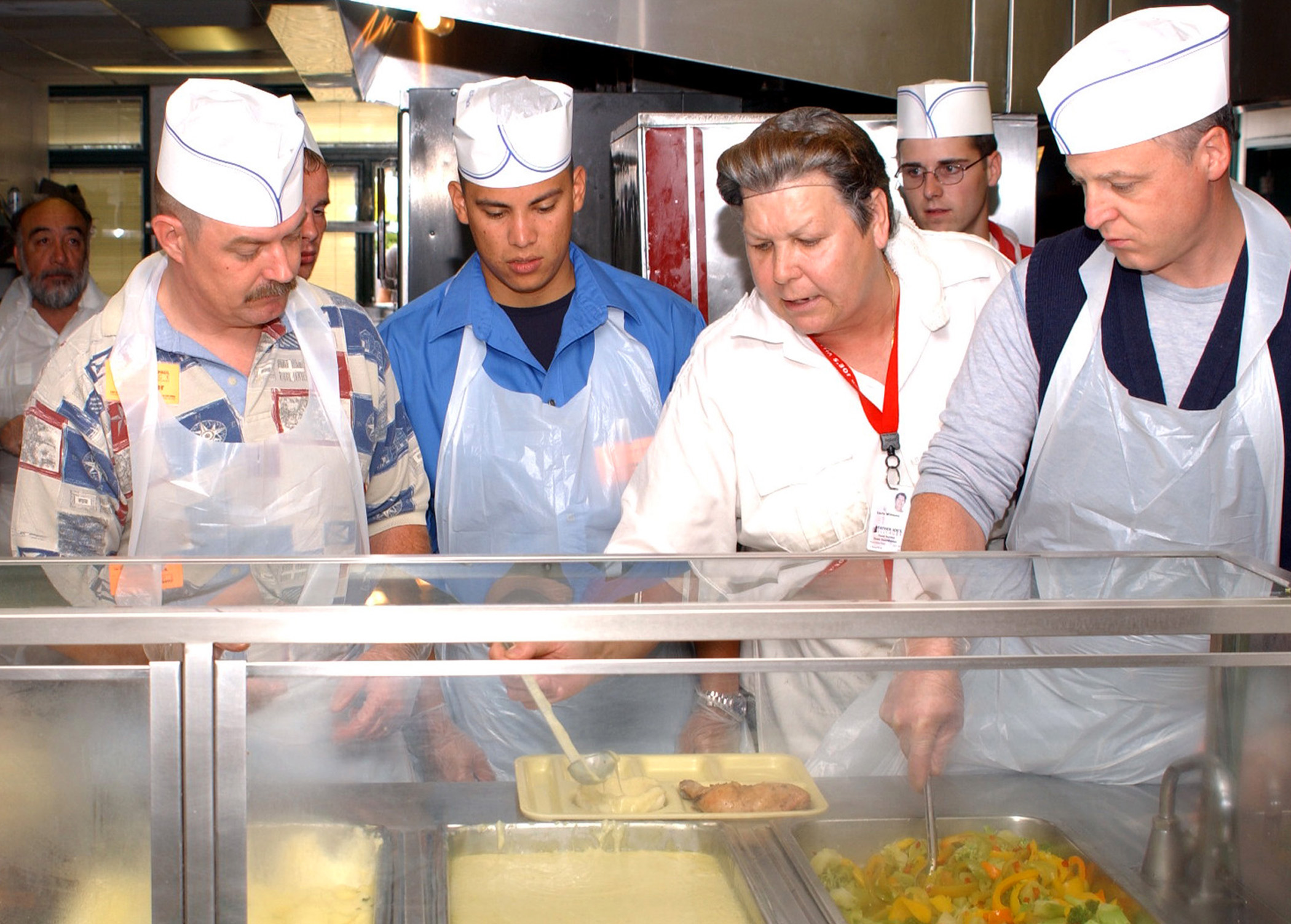
A Navy chaplain, the command master chief, and other sailors from the USS Tarawa (LHA-1), volunteer at St. Vincent de Paul Village food shelter in downtown San Diego in 2004.

In 1950, Bishop Charles F. Buddy, then-bishop of the Roman Catholic Diocese of San Diego, dedicated a chapel on F Street in downtown San Diego to serve the poor. The chapel would merge with a thrift store and became the St. Vincent de Paul Center in the Gaslamp Quarter. In 1981, Carroll took over the organization, and it moved to the East Village. In 1987, the organization opened the Joan Kroc Center which provided childcare, housing, job training, meals, and a medical clinic; this was followed by two other centers in 1989, and 1994. In 1991 the organization became a separate organization independent of the Roman Catholic Diocese of San Diego. In 2011, Carroll retired from leading the organization; that year the organization employed 500 people, and had a budget of $40 million. In 2015, the organization was renamed for Carroll; Carroll disagreed with the name change. As of 2020, it is the largest service provider for homeless individuals in the City of San Diego.
