= Mark Carroll =

Mark Carroll may refer to:

- Mark Carroll (rugby league) (born 1967), Australian rugby league footballer
- Mark Carroll (runner) (born 1972), Irish runner
- Mark Kenny Carroll (1896–1985), American prelate of the Roman Catholic Church
