= Philip J. Carroll =

British businessman (1937–2014)

- Born: 1937
- Died: 2014 (aged 76–77)
- Education: Loyola University New Orleans (B.S.); Tulane University (M.S.)

Philip J. Carroll, Jr. (1937–2014) was an American businessman who was active in a variety of corporate and government roles. Carroll earned a Bachelor of Science in physics from Loyola University New Orleans in 1958 and a M.S. in physics from Tulane University in 1961, after which he joined the Shell Oil company as an engineer. He died in Houston, Texas, on October 6, 2014.

Carroll became the CEO of Shell Oil in 1993 and served in that position until July 1998, when he became the chairman and CEO of Fluor Corporation, an engineering and construction services firm. He retired from Fluor in February 2002.

He was a non-executive director of the British defense company BAE Systems. Carroll was a member of the board of directors of other companies, including Boise Cascade, Vulcan Materials, American Express, Scottish Power, and Texas Medical Center.

Carroll was an honorary life member of the board of the American Petroleum Institute, a member of the Tulane University advisory board, and the James A. Baker III Institute for Public Policy at Rice University and the University of Houston.

In the 1970s Carroll briefly served as the director of the U.S. Department of Commerce's Energy Conservation Division and the Director of the National Industrial Energy Conservation Council. In 2003 he was appointed by the Bush administration to head the policy planning advisory board of the Iraqi Oil Ministry. Carroll opposed the neo-conservative-backed plan to privatize Iraqi oil. He told Newsnight: "Many Neo-Conservatives are people who have certain ideological beliefs about markets, about democracy, about this, that and the other. International oil companies, without exception, are very pragmatic commercial organizations. They don't have a theology."

== News ==
- An American and 2 Iraqis to Assume Key Oil Posts, New York Times, May 2, 2003.
- BBC with Greg Palast
