= Joseph Carroll (footballer) =

English footballer

Personal information
- Position: Left half

Senior career*
Years	Team	Apps	(Gls)
1919–1920	Bradford City	1	(0)
- * Club domestic league appearances and goals

Joseph Carroll was an English professional footballer who played as a left half.

== Career ==
Carroll played for Bradford City between 1919 and 1920. For Bradford City, he made 1 appearance in the Football League.

== Sources ==
- Frost, Terry (1988). Bradford City A Complete Record 1903-1988. Breedon Books Sport. ISBN 0-907969-38-0.
