= Mavis B. Carroll =

American statistician (1917–2009)

- Born: October 12, 1917
- Died: March 7, 2009 (aged 91); Wilmington, North Carolina, US
- Other names: Bowler
- Education: New Jersey College for Women
- Occupation: statistician
- Employer(s): General Foods Research Center, || Squibb Institute for Medical Research

Mavis Bowler Carroll (October 12, 1917 – March 7, 2009) was an American statistician who pioneered the industrial use of statistics in her work at General Foods.

Carroll finished high school at age 16 and attended the New Jersey College for Women on a scholarship. She played on the school basketball team, and earned a bachelor's degree in mathematics there in 1938. She worked as a code breaker during World War II and at the Squibb Institute for Medical Research in New Brunswick, New Jersey in the early 1950s.

Later, she worked at the General Foods Research Center, where she became Section Head in 1958 and, by the 1960s, the head of their division of mathematical and statistical services. Her work at General Foods included the design and analysis of taste tests, with each variation of a food product typically being tested by a panel of 50 tasters (evenly split by gender) who rated the foods on a scale of +3 to −3. In order to keep the total number of tasters manageable, a careful design of experiments was needed to control the number of different food variations to be tested.

Carroll was secretary of the American Society for Testing and Materials for 1960 to 1962. In 1971, Carroll was elected as a Fellow of the American Statistical Association.

Carroll died of pneumonia on March 7, 2009, in Wilmington, North Carolina.
