= Patrick J. Carroll =

British actor in New Zealand

Patrick John Carroll
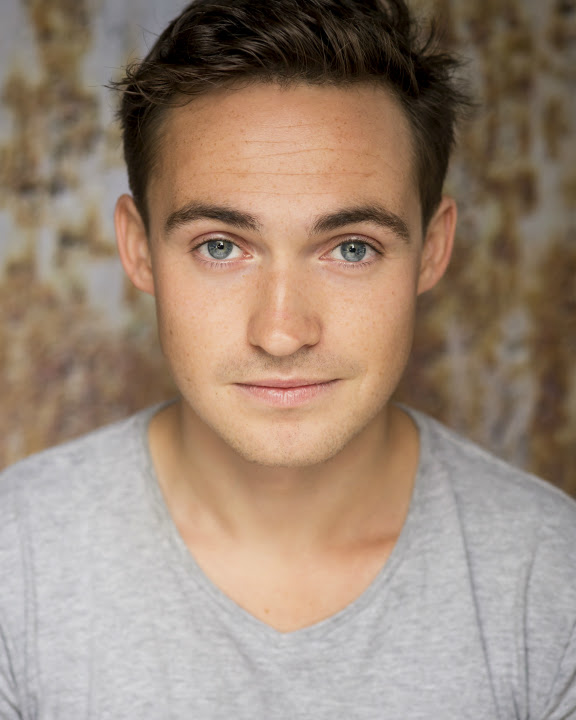
- Born: 1991 (age 34–35); Bath, Somerset, England
- Occupation: Actor

Patrick John Carroll is an actor from Bath, Somerset, England, now based in Auckland, New Zealand. He is best known for his roles in Kiwi, a full length TVNZ tele feature film, and The Luminaries.

== Early life and education ==
Carroll was born in England in 1991 and attended the Preparatory School for Monkton Combe School, Bath. He and his family emigrated to New Zealand in 2004 and he was educated at St Andrew's College, Christchurch. He is a graduate of NZ Drama school Toi Whakaari, with a Bachelor of Performing Arts, and has worked with Long Cloud Youth Theatre and travelled to London's Globe Theatre with Shakespeare Globe Centre New Zealand. In 2014 Carroll attended the Buffon/Le Jeu at L'Ecole Phillipe Gaulier in Paris. He also played in Shakespeare's Measure for Measure, Strindberg's A Dream-play, and As You Like It. He is represented by Auckland Actors and has played as Thomas Klopper in the award-winning staging of The Book of Everything in 2015/2016 at the Silo Theatre. Over these years, Carroll has performed in Alice In Wonderland, The Angry Brigade, Twelfth Night, and has toured the country with Indian Ink's The Elephant Thief, and in their subsequent production of Welcome To The Murder House, playing Thomas Edison. Carroll has won the Sam Wanamaker Award for Best Newcomer for his performance as Peter Quince in A Midsummer Night's Dream in SGCNZ's 2009 National University of Otago Sheilah Winn Shakespeare Festival. From that, he was chosen to be one of 48 out of 5500 to attend SGCNZ's NSSP and was then selected as one of 24 members of SGCNZ Young Shakespeare Company 2010. He was the recipient of the Museum Art Hotel Scholarship Award in 2014. Carroll was cast in several roles with the Pop Up Globe NZ, performing in both Auckland and Sydney, Australia, as Demetrius in A Midsummer Night's Dream and Lorenzo in The Merchant of Venice. Since early 2022 Patrick has been living and working as a teacher in Auckland whilst still continuing to collaborate with various theatre companies throughout New Zealand.

== Filmography ==
- 2020 The Luminaries, as the Real Estate Agent
- 2017 Kiwi (telefeature), as Jimmy Cassidy

== Theatre ==
- 2021 Dakota Of The White Flats, as Lassiter Peach
- 2020 Before Karma Gets Us, as Director
- 2019 Twelfth Night, as Orsino
- 2019 Heat, as Bob
- 2018 The Merchant of Venice, as Lorenzo
- 2018 A Midsummer Night's Dream, as Demetrius
- 2018 Welcome to the Murder House, as The Forger
- 2017 Midsummer Nights Dream, as Demetrius
- 2017 Merchant of Venice, as Lorenzo
- 2016 The Elephant Thief
- 2016 The Book of Everything, as Thomas
- 2016 The Angry Brigade, as D.C Smith
- 2015 Twelfth Night, as Sebastian
- 2015 Alice in Wonderland, as Jimmie
- 2015 The Elephant Thief
- 2010 The Misanthrope, as Philante
