= Myles A. Brown =

American physician

Myles A. Brown is an American oncologist who studies connections between hormones, breast cancer, and prostate cancer, particularly focusing on the role of estrogen receptors. He is Emil Frei III Professor of Medicine in the Harvard Medical School, and director of the Center for Functional Cancer Epigenetics in the Dana–Farber Cancer Institute.

Brown was elected to the National Academy of Sciences in 2016, the American Academy of Arts and Sciences in 2017, and the National Academy of Medicine in 2020.
