= Andrzej Dybicz =

Polish footballer (born 1952)

Personal information
- Date of birth: 15 February 1952 (age 74)
- Height: 1.76 m (5 ft 9 in)
- Position: Midfielder

Senior career*
Years	Team	Apps	(Gls)
1974–1982	Arka Gdynia		
1986–1989	Jönköpings Södra IF		

Managerial career
- 1997–2000: Tenhults IF
- * Club domestic league appearances and goals

Andrzej Dybicz (born 15 February 1952) is a Polish former professional footballer who played as a midfielder for Arka Gdynia and Swedish club Jönköpings Södra IF. He won the Polish Cup in 1979 with Arka Gdynia. He played 234 matches for Arka and is one of the most notable players in the club's history.

== Honours ==
Arka Gdynia

- Polish Cup: 1978–79
