= George Carroll =

George Carroll is the name of:

- George Washington Carroll (1855–1935), Presidential election running mate in 1904
- George Carroll (ice hockey) (1897–1939), Canadian hockey player
- George Carroll (judge) (1922–2016), American politician, activist and jurist
- George Carroll (instrument maker) (1902–1983), American astronomical instrument maker
- Slaine (2000s–2020s), American rapper and actor (birth name)

== See also ==
- 144633 Georgecarroll asteroid named after the instrument maker
