= Mary C. Hutchinson =

American politician

Member of the Washington House of Representatives from the 39th district
- In office 1928–1932

Personal details
- Born: 1876 or 1878 Kansas
- Died: November 17, 1958 Los Angeles, California
- Party: Republican

Mary C. Hutchinson (1876 or 1878 – November 17, 1958) was an American politician. She was a Republican, representing District 39 in the Washington House of Representatives which included parts of Pierce County, from 1928 to 1932.
