= Daniel Carroll (disambiguation) =

Daniel Carroll (1730–1796) was an American politician and plantation owner from Maryland.

Daniel Carroll may also refer to:

- Daniel Carroll (rugby union) (1892–1956), Australian-American rugby union footballer
- Daniel H. Carroll (1878–1966), American politician
- Daniel J. Carroll (1874–1927), New York politician
- Daniel Lynn Carroll (1797–1851), President of Hampden–Sydney College
- Daniel Patrick Carroll, better known as Danny La Rue (1927–2009), British entertainer
- Danny Carroll (Iowa politician) (born 1953), member of the Iowa House of Representatives
- Danny Carroll (Kentucky politician) (born 1963), member of the Kentucky Senate
- Dan Carroll (born 1949), American speed skater

== See also ==
- Daniel O'Carroll (died 1750), British Army officer
