= Flo McGarrell =

American artist, filmmaker and writer (1974–2010)

Flores "Flo" McGarrell (August 31, 1974 – January 12, 2010) was an American artist, filmmaker, writer and arts administrator. He was raised in Umbertide, Italy and St. Louis, Missouri, United States.

He lived and worked in Roswell, New Mexico, San Francisco, California, Newbury, Vermont and Jacmel, Haiti. He specialized in agri-sculpture - sculpture constructed from recycled and organic material and plants. In Jacmel, he directed a nonprofit arts center called FOSAJ.

== Biography ==
McGarrell was born Flora McGarrell to expatriate artist parents in Rome, where his father James McGarrell was the recipient of a Fulbright grant, as well as fellowships from the National Endowment for the Arts, the Guggenheim Foundation, and the Rockefeller Foundation at Bellagio in Italy. His mother, Ann, is a writer, poet and translator. They moved back to America when Flo was 8 years old and now live in Newbury, Vermont. Flo McGarrell received a B.F.A. in Fibers and an M.A. in Digital Arts from the Maryland Institute College of Art, 1992–1998. In 1997 he co-founded Little Big Bang, a non-profit arts organization which performed/exhibited for four years in such diverse venues as the Baltimore Museum of Art, the American Visionary Art Museum, as well as local galleries, festivals, and the streets.

After earning his first master's degree he taught video and electronic arts at the Maryland Institute College of Art, and at the Baltimore School for the Arts. In 2004 he received an M.F.A. in Art and Technology Studies at the School of the Art Institute of Chicago where his hybrid skills in sculpture and digital craft were utilized to create inflatable spaces, with light, sound, and video projection. In 2004, he had a solo exhibition at Lisa Dent Gallery in San Francisco, and in 2007 he was part of the Roswell Artist in Residence Program where he experimented in sustainable living as sculpture.

Since his youth McGarrell was fascinated with Haiti and Haitian culture and in 2008 he took the position of director of the art center FOSAJ in Jacmel, a city famed for its art located on the southern coast of Haiti. FOSAJ was founded in 2003 by a wealthy local family and its mission is to revive the international market for locally made art, which collapsed due to decades of political instability. McGarrell served as director of the center until his death and during his tenure he develop a relationship with local artists and the community. Fosaj board member Regine Boucard said of McGarrell that, "Everybody loved him — the artists, the students, the community. And he sort of understood the Haitians."

== Death ==
On Tuesday, January 12, 2010, a devastating magnitude 7.0 M earthquake centered approximately 25 kilometres (16 mi) west of Port-au-Prince, leveled buildings throughout Haiti, including the "Peace of Mind" Hotel in Jacmel. McGarrell had just dropped off his godfather in Port-au-Prince and had stopped off at the hotel on his way to the FOSAJ center, where he both lived and worked. He was sitting with a visiting friend and fellow artist, Sue Frame, when the earthquake hit and was killed as the building collapsed on top of him. He was apparently killed instantly. Frame ran out at the first tremor; McGarrell hesitated briefly, perhaps concerned for his laptop computer.

== Works ==
An early interest in metalsmithing over time, developed into a commitment to installation art with a focus on political concerns and ecology. Most of McGarrell's mature work utilized strongly color-coordinated plastics to create interior/exterior spaces, and living plants to create functioning vegetable gardens, also situated indoors and out. McGarrell's installations were created, as much as feasible, from discarded, recycled materials. His gardens functioned from recycled grey water and included hands-on, instructive material on creating compost at home and the artist's own recipes for meals designed from both a nutritional standpoint and their palatability. This teaching material, as well as most of McGarrell's other writing, was distributed freely, in accordance with the artist's dedication to free copyright, or Creative Commons approach to intellectual property.

McGarrell was the art director of the film, Maggots and Men , an experimental retelling of the story of the 1921 uprising of the Kronstadt sailors in post-revolutionary Russia.

== Transgender identity ==
Assigned to a female gender role at birth, McGarrell identified strongly with androgyny since childhood, and the transgender and queer (or radical queer) community as an adult. He began formally identifying as a male in 2003-04. His transition involved a limited amount of hormone therapy—but no surgery—and was part of an intellectual journey into radical politics which was, in turn, related to the artist's philosophy and output. He described himself as "a total gender mash up (beard, miniskirt, etc.)" and as a "non-passing transperson."
