= James McGarrell =

American painter (1930–2020)

- Born: February 22, 1930; Indianapolis, Indiana
- Died: February 7, 2020 (aged 89)

James McGarrell (February 22, 1930 – February 7, 2020) was an American painter and printmaker known for painting lush figurative interiors and landscapes.

== Biography ==
James McGarrell was born in Indianapolis, Indiana, and began painting in the basement of his parents' house at age 20. His first formal art studies were at Indiana University Bloomington and at the Skowhegan School of Painting and Sculpture. He then entered the graduate painting program at the University of California, Los Angeles. In 1955 McGarrell had his first solo exhibition at the Frank Perls Gallery in Beverly Hills, California and received a Fulbright grant to the State Academy of Fine Arts Stuttgart.

After returning from Germany in 1956, McGarrell began a long distinguished academic career at Reed College in Portland, Oregon. Three years later he returned to Indiana University to direct the graduate painting program. In 1981 he accepted a position in the St. Louis School of Fine Arts at Washington University in St. Louis, where he remained until his retirement from teaching in 1993. He has also been an artist in residence at many institutions for short periods, most notably at Skowhegan, the International School in Umbria, Rice University, the University of Utah, Arizona State University, and Dartmouth College.

During the past half century McGarrell had more than a hundred solo exhibitions at galleries and museums in America, England, France, and Italy. His paintings, prints, and drawings have been included in hundreds of exhibitions in the United States, South America, Europe, and Japan.

He was a member of the National Academy and Correspondent Member of the Académie des Beaux-Arts de l'Institut de France. In 1995 he was the recipient of the Jimmy Ernst Lifetime Achievement Award from the American Institute of Arts and Letters.

McGarrell held residencies, grants, and fellowships from the National Endowment for the Arts, the John Simon Guggenheim Memorial Foundation, and the study centers of the Bogliasco Foundation outside Genoa and the Rockefeller Foundation at Bellagio in Italy. He was also senior resident at the Roswell Artist-in-Residence program in New Mexico. His work has been included in: five Whitney Annuals and Biennials; the Carnegie International exhibition twice (1958 and 1983); New Images of Man at the Museum of Modern Art, New York City (1960); the Dunn International at the Tate Gallery, London (1963 and 1964); Documenta III (1964)in Kassel, Germany; and USA Art Vivant at the Musée des Augustins, Toulouse, France. He was one of five painters selected for The Figurative Tradition in American Art at the U.S. pavilion of the 1968 Venice Biennale. In 2003 several of his paintings were included in La creazione ansiosa: da Picasso a Bacon, a survey exhibition of later 20th-century art at the Palazzo Forti, Verona, Italy.

McGarrell's paintings are in the permanent collections of the Museum of Modern Art, the Whitney Museum of American Art, the Hirshhorn Museum and Sculpture Garden, the Art Institute of Chicago, the Pennsylvania Academy of the Fine Arts, the Portland Museum of Art, the Saint Louis Art Museum, the Santa Barbara Museum of Art, the Centre Pompidou, the Hamburg Museum of Art, and many other public and private collections in America and Europe. He was represented in New York by the George Adams Gallery.

== Family ==
While he was artist in residence at Dartmouth College in the spring term of 1993, McGarrell and his wife, the writer and translator Ann McGarrell, discovered and purchased an early 19th-century house in Newbury, Vermont where they lived with a number of cats until her death in 2016 and his death February 7, 2020.

The McGarrells' son, Flo McGarrell was an installation artist, filmmaker and writer (1974–2010), who was killed in the 2010 Haiti earthquake at the age of 35.

== Bibliography ==
- Gerrit Henry "James McGarrell at George Adams", Art in America, March 2003
- Esplund, Lance. "James McGarrell at George Adams", Art in America, May 2000
- Williams, Jonathan. "Flip Sides of a Vision", Modern Painters, Spring 1998
- Benton, William. Marmalade (poetry, limited edition) with original prints by McGarrell, 1993
