= Paul Carroll =

Paul Carroll may refer to:

- Paul Vincent Carroll (1900–1968), Irish dramatist and writer
- Paul T. Carroll (1910–1954), United States Army brigadier-general
- Paul Carroll (poet) (1926–1996), American poet
- Paul Carroll (Royal Navy officer) (born 1970), British Royal Navy rear-admiral
- Paul Carroll (volleyball) (born 1986), Australian volleyball player
- Paul Carroll, invented The World Flag in 1988
