= Henry Carroll =

Henry Carroll may refer to:

- Henry Carroll (general) (1836–1908), American brigadier general
- Henry Carroll (soccer) (1909–1999), American soccer player
- Henry George Carroll (1865–1939), Canadian politician
- Henry Nelson Carroll (1937–2015), Canadian lawyer and politician
- Henry L. Carroll (born 1947), American racehorse trainer
- Henry Carroll (lawyer) (1772–1820), American lawyer and statesman
