= Thomas J. Carroll =

Catholic priest and advocate for the blind

Father Thomas J. Carroll
- Born: August 6, 1909; Gloucester, Massachusetts, U.S.
- Died: April 24, 1971
- Education: College of the Holy Cross (BA); Saint John's Seminary
- Known for: Work with the blind
- Notable work: Blindness (several translations)

Father Thomas J. Carroll (August 6, 1909 – April 24, 1971) was a Catholic priest and a pioneer in treatment for people who became blind later in their lives,. He was also a leader in implementing liturgical renewal in the Catholic church after Vatican II and took an active part in the civil rights movement.

== Early adult life ==
Father Thomas Carroll graduated from the College of the Holy Cross in 1932 and from St. Johns Seminary in Brighton, Massachusetts, in 1938.

He was ordained May 20, 1938, by Bishop Francis Spellman.

== U.S. liturgical movement ==
Liturgy is a rite or body of rites prescribed for public worship. Rev. Thomas J. Carroll was a pioneer and leader in the Liturgical Movement in the U.S. He was the president of the New England Regional Unit of the National Liturgical Conference, and founded a newsletter "the Mediator". He was president of the National Liturgical Conference from 1946 to 1949, and was on both the executive committee and the Advisory Council.

== Work with the blind ==
In addition to his work on Liturgical reform, he is best known for his work with the blind, especially those who become blind as adults. He was a pioneer in rehabilitation for the blind and in the specific area of Orientation and Mobility (O&M). In 1938, Carroll's first assignment after ordination was as the assistant director of the Catholic Guild for The Blind, an agency of the Archdiocese of Boston, Massachusetts.

In October 1944, he was appointed chaplain of St. Raphael's Hall in Newton, Massachusetts.

Carroll played a key role in the establishment of low vision and blind services for the military and veterans administrations. He was auxiliary chaplain working with blinded serviceman at the U.S. Army's Ophthalmological Center located at Valley Forge, Pennsylvania, and at the Avon Old Farms Convalescent Hospital in Connecticut from 1944 to 1947. He helped to found the Blinded Veterans Association (BVA) and was its National Chaplain until his death in 1971.

In 1945, the U.S. Army established the "Honorary Civilian Advisory Committee, Program for the War Blinded of the United States Army". Members included Robert Irwin (Chairman of the committee), Colonel Baker (Canada), Reverend Thomas Carroll, Joseph G. Cauffma, Dr. Roma S. Cheek, Dr. Gabriel Farrell, Philip N. Harrison, R. Henry P. Johnson, Mrs. Lee Johnson, W.L.McDaniel, Eber L. Palmer, Peter J. Salmon. The committee was disbanded in 1946, but the members, plus three additional members, then became the VA's Committee on the Blinded Veteran with the permission of General Omar Bradley, the new head of the VA. Carroll also served on the President's Committee on Employment of the Handicapped. He served on the program for the war-blinded of the U.S. Army. In November 1946, he became executive director of the Catholic Guild for all of the blind replacing Father Connolly.

Father Carroll was a fencer. While working with the blinded vets in Avon Old Farms Convalescent Hospital he saw blinded vets fencing, which was easily accepted by the vets as a competitive skill for combat. Carroll saw the connection between fencing and cane travel, so he introduced fencing to the trainees at the St. Paul's Rehabilitation Center for Newly Blinded Adults when he got it going. The fencing program he implemented in the 1940s was the first designed for the blind. He introduced the fencing program at the Carroll Center in 1954 with Larry Dargle. They then brought in Eric Sollee in 1968. Eric Sollee took over in 1972 and continued to teach there for four decades.

In 1953, in the United States there were only 40 full-time mobility restoration experts. Recognizing a lack of sufficient experts, Father Carroll helped to organize the first conference on mobility restoration at his family's home near Gloucester, Massachusetts. This three-day conference gathered thirty experts in a range of fields regarding blind activities. During the conference, the non-blind experts (five were blind) were blindfolded for two hours. Speaking of this experience, Carroll said, "We recognized immediately our feeling of fright, insecurity, groping, and awkwardness. …This shows, in a way that no amount of discussion could, how great is the need for coordinated scientific mobility training." As a result of this conference, a Committee on Mobility Restoration was formed. Dr. A.B.C. Knudsen, director of the Veteran's Administration physical medicine and rehabilitation, one of the attendees, advocated for a national program, patterned after the Army's program for rehabilitation of the blind.

In 1954, under Father Carroll's direction and based on his experience with blinded servicemen, the Guild founded St. Paul's Rehabilitation Center for newly blinded adults on the Guild's grounds. Prior to this, the Guild consisted of St. Raphael's Hall, which was primarily a safe haven for elderly blind women. At St. Paul, all of the blind, including the elderly, were taught to do as much as they could for themselves. The name of the hall (as part of St. Paul's) was changed to St. Raphael's Geriatric Adjustment Center for the Blind and the Visually Handicapped. Skills taught included operating power tools including a buzz saw and cooking using an electric mixer and gas stove. In addition to building skills, each blind person developed confidence and independence.

In 1957 to 1958, Father Carroll stayed at the Rusk Institute of Physical Medicine and Rehabilitation in New York for surgery on and rehabilitation of his leg following a traffic accident. At the beginning of these 13 months, Dr. Howard Rusk told him that it would be about a ten-day stay. Dr. Rusk had presented the AFB Migel Medal to Father Carroll earlier in 1957.

Father Thomas Carroll wrote Blindness: What it is, What it Does and How to Live with it in 1961. In it, he characterized blindness in terms of 20 losses, and as the 'death' of the sighted individual.

The Greater Pittsburgh Guild for the Blind located in Bridgeville, Pennsylvania, was created under the influence of Father Carroll. In 1959, the Catholic Guild for the blind was dissolved and replaced by the non-sectarian Greater Pittsburgh Guild where "... we continue the Carroll Revolution" using his book Blindness: What it is, What it Does and How to Live with it as their textbook.

In 1959, the American Foundation for the Blind funded a national conference to establish the criteria for selecting O&M personnel. This group included the people who had helped to develop Orientation and Mobility (O&M) training procedures for the visually impaired: Richard Hoover, Father Carroll, Frederick Jervis, and other practitioners and administrators.

In 1963, Father Carroll founded the American Center for Research and Blindness in Newton, Massachusetts. This was one of the first laboratories devoted to the medical, psychological, sociological, and rehabilitation problems of the blind.

In 1964, the center was renamed to the Catholic Guild for All the Blind to reflect the fact that it served people regardless of their religion. In 1972, it was renamed to the Carroll Rehabilitation Center for the Visually Impaired, in memory of Father Carroll who had died in 1971. He introduced rehabilitation concepts into the program at the Catholic Guild, including many firsts such as mobility training for blind persons in the community, in the American Center for Research in Blindness and Rehabilitation, and in St. Raphael's Geriatric Adjustment Center.

Carroll also worked with the American Foundation for the Blind.

== Civil rights ==
Father Carroll was active in the civil rights movement of the 1960s, both in national and local civil rights groups. He helped to organize Boston clergy to participate in the Selma to Montgomery march in 1965 and participated in it, including "Turnaround Tuesday", as is seen in the referenced video.

== Author ==
In addition to his book Blindness which was translated into several languages, he also wrote free verse. Among his published poems were: "Lines written on the death of Reverend Jame Reeb", "To Paul Dever" (former Governor of Massachusetts), and "Search for Identification" (on the death of Malcolm X).

== Death ==
Rev. Thomas J. Carroll died April 24, 1971, at St. Elizabeth's Hospital at the age of 61.

== Honors and awards ==
Father Carroll received close to 100 awards for his work with the blind, including the Associated Services for the Blind's Louis Braille Award in 1961, the National Rehabilitation Association's Outstanding Achievement Award in 1960, the Migel Medal of the American Foundation for the Blind (AFB), the Leslie Dana award from the St. Louis Society for the Blind (awarded annually since 1925), and the Bell Greve Memorial award of the National Rehabilitation Association. He is in the American Printing House for the Blind Hall of Fame. Awards in his memory include the Carroll Society Award, given annually, and the Father Carroll Award given alternate years. In addition, the BVA has a speech in his memory at the annual Father Carroll luncheon at their national convention.

Additional Awards:

- War Department – Appreciation of Patriotic Service – 9/2/47
- Blinded Veterans Association – Certificate of Appreciation 5/16/53
- Holy Cross – Honorary Degree 6/8/56
- Commission of Standards and Accreditation – Outstanding Achievement Award – 4/30/58
- Massachusetts Council of Organizations for the Blind – Bay State Award – 5/58
- Commonwealth of MA – 3/59
- Ma Chapter of Rehabilitation Association – Certificate of Meritorious Service 5/10/60
- Rehab Centers and Facilities – Associate Member 6/61
- President's Committee on Employment of the Physically Handicapped – 1959-1960-1961
- International Society for Rehabilitation of Disabled – Member of World Commission of Rehabilitation – 2/28/61
- Department on Labor – Advisory Committee on Sheltered Workshops 7/1/66
- Klocke Martin Award – American federation of the Catholic Workers for the Blind – 10/67
- Royal Society of Health 9/10/68
- American Public Health Association – Fellow – 11/69
- President's Committee on Employment of the Physically Handicapped 1969, 1970, 1971
- Bell Greve Memorial Award – 1980
