= Harry Schellekens =

Dutch footballer

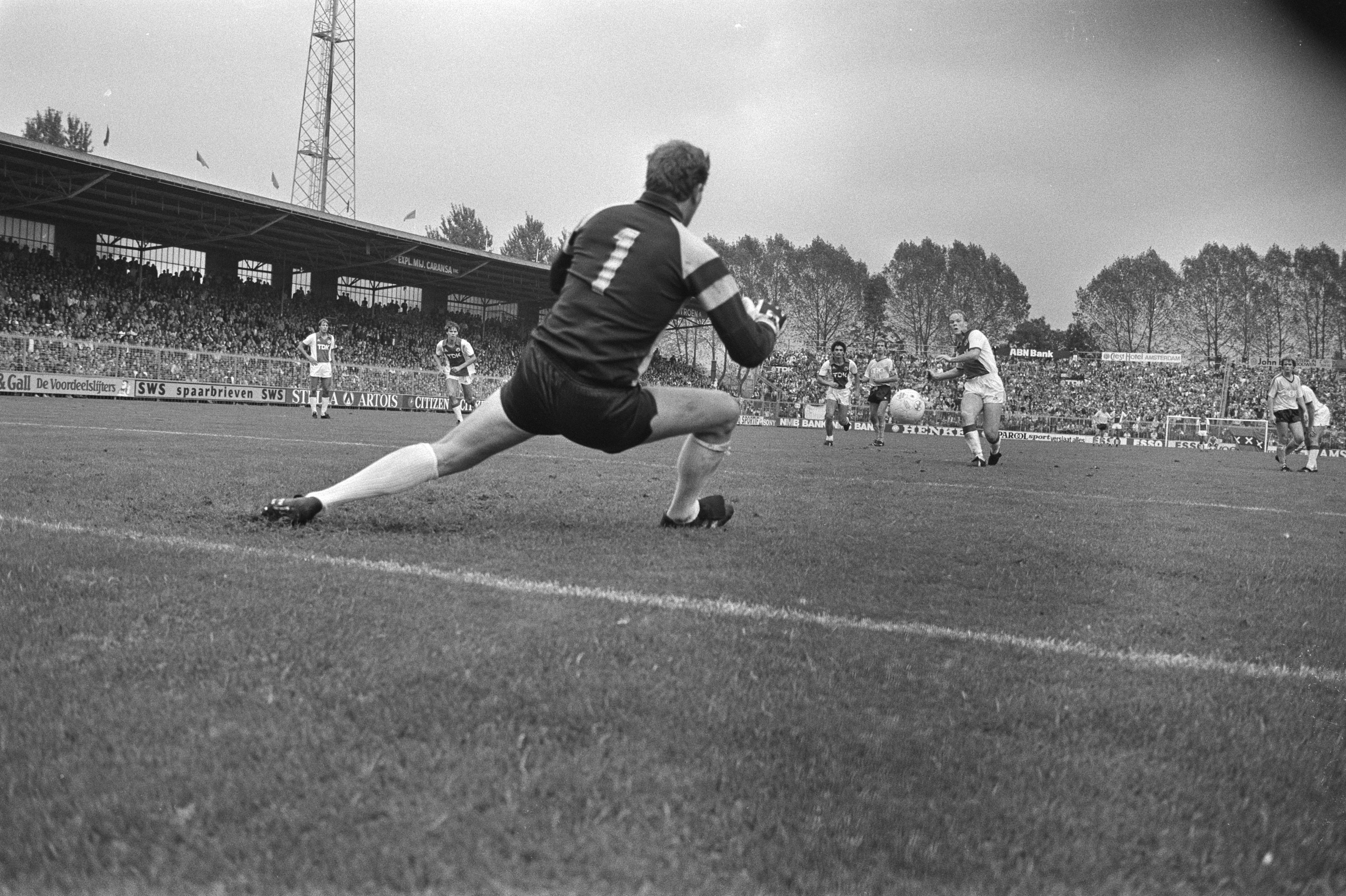
Schellekens stops a penalty by Ronald Koeman (1983)

Harry Schellekens (born 5 November 1952 in Boxtel, North Brabant) is a former association football goalkeeper, who played for NEC Nijmegen, FC Groningen and Vitesse Arnhem. Once he was a reserve player for the Netherlands national football team, on 30 May 1975 against Yugoslavia in Belgrade.
