= Hervé Gorce =

French footballer (1952-2008)

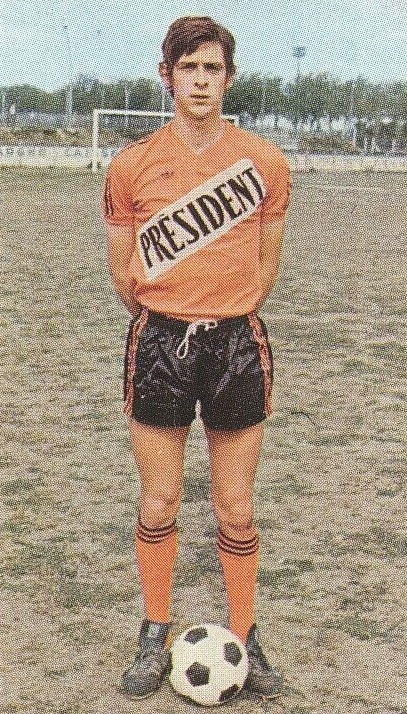
- Hervé Gorce in 1976.

Personal information
- Full name: Hervé Gorce
- Date of birth: December 3, 1952
- Place of birth: Malo-les-Bains, France
- Date of death: August 14, 2008 (aged 55)
- Place of death: Dunkerque, France
- Height: 1.81 m (5 ft 11 1/2 in)
- Position: Defender

Youth career
- Dunkerque

Senior career*
Years	Team	Apps	(Gls)
1972–1976	Dunkerque		
1976–1977	Laval	32	(0)
1977–1980	Dunkerque		
Total		196	(18)
- * Club domestic league appearances and goals

Hervé Gorce (3 December 1952 – 14 August 2008) was a professional football defender who played for USL Dunkerque and Stade Lavallois. He was also a Ligue de Football Professionnel board member.

== Career ==
Born in Malo-les-Bains, Gorce began playing youth football with local side USL Dunkerque. He joined Dunkerque's senior side in 1972, and made 164 Ligue 2 appearances for the club during his career. He also played one season in Ligue 1 with Laval.

After retiring from playing football, Gorce became an administrator. He was appointed director of several clubs, including USL Dunkerque, and joined the Ligue de Football Professionnel board in 2001.

== Personal ==
Gorce died at age 55 on 14 August 2008.
