= Mary K. Carroll =

American chemist

Mary K. Carroll Mahony (born 1964) is an American chemist.

Carroll was born in Massachusetts in 1964, and raised in upstate New York. She earned a bachelor's degree from Union College in 1986, followed by a doctorate at Indiana University Bloomington in 1991 before conducting postdoctoral research at the University of Massachusetts Amherst. She returned to Union College in 1992 as a faculty member, receiving successive promotions from assistant to associate and full professor in 1998 and 2005. Carroll became Union's Dwane W. Crichton Professor of Chemistry in 2017. In returning to Union College, Carroll was the first Union alumna to be hired as a tenure-track professor by her alma mater.

Carroll joined the American Chemical Society (ACS) as a member in 1986, began serving as councilor of the Eastern New York ACS section in 1998, and was elected an ACS fellow in 2016, before serving as ACS president-elect and president in 2023 and 2024, respectively.

Carroll's husband Michael Mahony and two daughters have also graduated from Union College.
