= Peter Carroll (sportsman) =

Australian cricketer and academic

Personal information
- Full name: Peter Robert Carroll
- Born: 7 November 1941 (age 85); Mosman, New South Wales, Australia
- Batting: Right-handed
- Bowling: Right-arm medium

Domestic team information
- Years: Team
- 1969–1971: Oxford University

Career statistics
Competition	First-class
Matches	14
Runs scored	403
Batting average	16.12
100s/50s	–/1
Top score	60*
Balls bowled	108
Wickets	0
Bowling average	–
5 wickets in innings	–
10 wickets in match	–
Best bowling	–
Catches/stumpings	4/–
- Source: Cricinfo, 14 July 2020

Peter Robert Carroll (born 7 November 1941) is an Australian former first-class cricketer and rugby union player.

Carroll was born at the Sydney suburb of Mosman in November 1941. He later studied as a mature student in England at Mansfield College at the University of Oxford. While studying at Oxford, he played first-class cricket for Oxford University from 1969–71, making fourteen appearances. Carroll scored 403 runs in his fourteen matches, at an average of 16.12 and a high score of 60 not out, his only first-class half century.

Besides playing first-class cricket, Carroll also played rugby union as a fullback at domestic level in both Australia and England. His teams at domestic level included Northern Suburbs in Australia and Harlequins and Oxford University. He made one appearance for the Barbarians, against Penarth RFC in April 1971.
