= James Carroll (cricketer) =

English cricketer

Personal information
- Full name: James Thomas Carroll
- Born: 18 March 1843; Gravesend, Kent
- Died: 1 April 1926 (aged 83); Gravesend, Kent
- Batting: Right-handed
- Bowling: Right-arm fast-medium

Domestic team information
- Years: Team
- 1865–1869: Kent
- FC debut: 15 June 1865 Kent v Sussex
- Last FC: 12 July 1869 Kent v Sussex

Career statistics
Competition	First-class
Matches	33
Runs scored	610
Batting average	12.20
100s/50s	0/0
Top score	48
Balls bowled	519
Wickets	8
Bowling average	32.12
5 wickets in innings	0
10 wickets in match	0
Best bowling	2/21
Catches/stumpings	12/–
- Source: Cricinfo, 9 March 2017

James Thomas Carroll (18 March 1843 – 1 April 1926) was an English professional cricketer. He played 33 first-class matches for Kent County Cricket Club between 1865 and 1869.

Carroll was born at Gravesend in Kent in 1843, the son of Jane Carroll. His mother, who worked as a charwoman, was widowed and he was raised in the town by her and an uncle.

After playing matches for Kent Colts in 1863 and 1864, Carroll was called into the county team in 1865, making his first-class debut against Sussex at Hove. He played in each of the four following season, regularly appearing for the county team. Described as a "free hitting batsman" who played with "good style" and a "wonderful field", Carroll played in a total of 33 first-class matches, all for Kent. He scored a total of 610 runs with a highest score of 48―made on debut―and took eight wickets.

Carroll worked as a plumber and decorator, but was also employed as a professional cricketer at Lancing College, and at clubs including Gravesend and Milton, his home team. He scored a century for the Mid-Kent club in 1871. He was married and had three children. Carroll died at Gravesend in 1926 aged 83.

== Bibliography ==
- Carlaw, Derek (2020). Kent County Cricketers, A to Z: Part One (1806–1914) (PDF). Cardiff: ACS.
