= José van Hoof =

Dutch football player (born 1952)

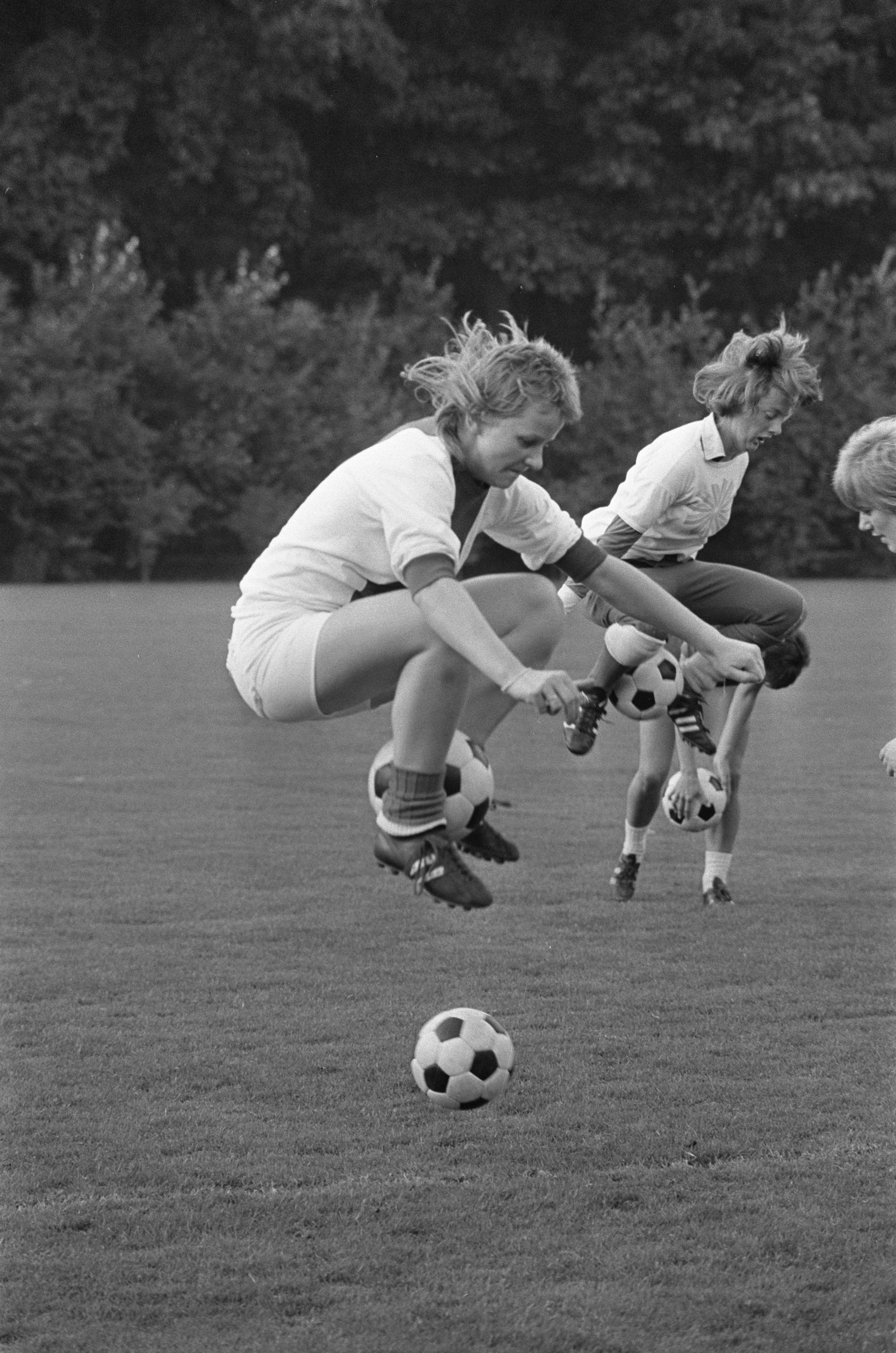

Personal information
- Date of birth: 22 August 1952 (age 74)
- Place of birth: Helmond, Netherlands
- Position: Forward

Youth career
- Bavos
- SV Braakhuizen

International career
| Years | Team | Apps | (Gls) |
| 1971-1978 | Netherlands | 16 | (8) |

Managerial career
- RKSV Prinses Irene
- PSV

José van Hoof (born 22 August 1952) is a retired Dutch footballer who played as a striker for PSV in the 1970s. She was referred to as the female Johan Cruyff. In 1971 she was part of the Dutch team that played the first FIFA, but not the Royal Dutch Football Association (KNVB), recognised international women's match ever. In 1973, she was the only player left over from that '71 team, who played in the first KNVB sanctioned game versus England.

== Career ==
Van Hoof began playing football at the Bavos club in Bakel, Netherlands, where she remained for five years, after which she played with Braakhuizen Geldrop for ten years. While there, she was a national champion three times.

Van Hoof played for years as center-forward in the Dutch national team and became a national champion multiple times with SV Braakhuizen. She was known for her scoring ability and speed. At the time, she became known as the female Johan Cruyff.

Van Hoof followed various trainer courses of the KNVB, then began coaching with high-level women's footballers, as well as with KNVB youth. She briefly trained the third team of NWC Asten, then moved to RKVV Keldonk, where she left early as head coach in her first season. In the summer of 2011, she switched to the second team of Bavos. In her first and only season in Bakel, she became champion of the 4th class reserve. The contract was not renewed. Van Hoof would then work for the women of SC 't Zand, but this collaboration ended before the season had started. During the 2012–13 season, she was in charge of the RKSV Princess Irene. She was also briefly the assistant coach for PSV / FC Eindhoven in the Women's BeNe League.
