= Vince O'Kane =

English footballer

Personal information
- Full name: Vincent O'Kane
- Date of birth: 20 November 1952 (age 73)
- Place of birth: Stepney, England
- Position: Midfielder

Senior career*
Years	Team	Apps	(Gls)
1970–1973	Charlton Athletic	32	(1)
1973	Kettering Town		
1973–1974	Chelmsford City		
- * Club domestic league appearances and goals

Vincent O'Kane (born 20 November 1952) is an English former professional footballer who played as a midfielder in the Football League for Charlton Athletic. He also played non-league football for clubs including Kettering Town and Chelmsford City.
