= Murder of Marcus Fiesel =

2006 murder of a child in Ohio

Marcus Fiesel
- Born: June 24, 2003; United States
- Died: August 4–6, 2006 (aged 3); Union Township, Clermont County, Ohio, United States
- Cause of death: Hyperthermia
- Known for: Child culpable homicide victim

Marcus Fiesel was an American 3-year-old child who was murdered in Clermont County, Ohio, in August 2006. Fiesel had recently been removed from his mother's care by child protective services, and placed into foster care with David and Liz Carroll in Union Township, where he died from hyperthermia after being restrained and neglected in a closet for a two-day period. On February 21, 2007, Liz Carroll was convicted of murdering him. On February 26, 2007, it was announced attorneys for David Carroll had reached a plea agreement.

== Background ==
Marcus Fiesel was born on June 24, 2003, and spent the first three years of his life in Middletown, Ohio, with his mother Donna Trevino (née Fiesel) and his two siblings, Michael and Peaches. He was described by a neighbor as "an awesome little guy" who loved flowers, Bob the Builder, and bubbles. According to friends, Fiesel was autistic and attended a school for special needs children. Fiesel was a very active child, and his mother found it difficult to cope with him, and a neighbor said she occasionally saw Trevino weeping with exhaustion. Frequent calls to the police were made to the home as Trevino was a regular victim of domestic violence at the hands of her boyfriend, and during these visits police officers noticed that the home was infested with fleas and reeked of feces. On September 29, 2005, police observed severe bruising on Fiesel's left buttock, and the family was also being investigated by child welfare workers who had received complaints of abuse. In January 2006, Fiesel crawled out of his second-story window and fell off the roof, resulting in a cut to his chin that required stitches. In April 2006, Fiesel was found wandering the streets and was almost hit by a car. Trevino told police that "she didn't know if she could care for her children any more and that it was getting to be too much for her." Butler County Job and Family Services was granted temporary custody.

=== Foster care ===
Lifeway for Youth, a private agency contracted by the state foster care system, placed Fiesel in the care of foster parents Liz and David Carroll, a couple from Union Township in nearby Clermont County. At the time, Lifeway for Youth were unaware that David Carroll had a mental health issue that would have disqualified him from foster parenting if known, and that a third adult, Amy Baker, said to be David's girlfriend, was living in the home. In June 2006, David Carroll was arrested on a domestic violence charge that was later dismissed, and did not report the arrest to Lifeway for Youth as required. Family and friends said that David Carroll did not like Fiesel and was jealous of his "constant" need for attention from Liz Carroll and Baker. At one point, Carroll left his wife because he was not sure he wanted a life with her raising foster children. When he moved back in with his wife, he brought Baker with him.

== Disappearance ==
Liz Carroll reported that Fiesel had gone missing on August 15, 2006. She said that she had blacked out due to low blood pressure at Juilfs Park in neighboring Anderson Township, where she was with four children: a child she had with David Carroll, another foster child, a toddler she was babysitting, and Fiesel. Carroll said when she regained consciousness, Fiesel was missing.

Hundreds of people, and search dogs, searched the area as part of the official search for Fiesel. Thousands more searched surrounding neighborhoods independent of the official search.

On August 22, 2006, Liz Carroll held a press conference asking that whoever may have taken Fiesel return him. She said, "I need help from the public to help my son, Marcus is my son. I know people think foster care is temporary, but please return him to a hospital.[...] Waking up every morning and not having him run to me is very difficult. I am closer than his birth mother to him." Because no witnesses reported seeing Fiesel in the park with Liz Carroll on August 15, and no trace of him was found, police and the public grew suspicious of Liz and David Carroll's claims.

== Discovery of Fiesel's death ==
Fiesel's incinerated remains were discovered on an 88-acre (360,000 m^{2}) estate owned by Mike Cales in Brown County, Ohio. Police said that Liz and David Carroll had left Fiesel locked in a closet, bound with a blanket and packing tape, while they attended a family reunion in Williamstown, Kentucky on August 4–6, 2006. This was confirmed by Liz Carroll in testimony before a grand jury on August 28, 2006; she claimed, "I didn't have any intentions of hurting him." Fiesel was left without food or water, but authorities believed he was killed by heat rather than dehydration or starvation, as temperatures in the closet may have reached 105–110 °F (41–43 °C). They found him dead when they returned home. Authorities believed it was David Carroll and Amy Baker who incinerated Fiesel's body. Amy Baker was granted immunity in Ohio in return for testimony, but she faced extradition from Ohio to Kentucky for a tampering with evidence charge brought against her by Mason County. Amy Baker confessed to helping to dispose of the body in the Ohio River, but charges against her were dropped.

== Charges against Liz and David Carroll ==
Both Liz and David Carroll were indicted in Clermont County and Hamilton County for playing a part in Fiesel's death and hindering the police investigation into Fiesel's disappearance.

On August 28, 2006, Liz and David Carroll were indicted by a Hamilton County Grand Jury on two counts of child endangerment, and one count of involuntary manslaughter. David Carroll was charged with an additional count of gross abuse of a corpse.

A day later on August 29, 2006, additional Hamilton County indictments were made against the Carrolls. Both David and Liz were charged on one count of making false alarms, and one count of inducing panic. Furthermore, David was charged with one count of gross abuse of a corpse. Liz was charged with two additional charges of perjury.

On September 1, 2006, Clermont County Prosecutor Don White and Hamilton County Prosecutor Joe Deters held a joint press conference, where they discussed plans for prosecuting the defendants. All murder and/or homicide charges were to be prosecuted by Clermont County, since Fiesel's death occurred inside the Carrolls' Union Township home. However, since the State of Ohio contends the Carrolls attempted to cover up Fiesel's death in Anderson Township in Hamilton County, all charges related to inducing panic and covering up the death of the child would be prosecuted in Hamilton County.

Several days later on September 6, 2006, a Clermont County grand jury indicted David Carroll on eight criminal counts. The charges against the Carrolls included: murder (1 count each), involuntary manslaughter (1 count each), kidnapping (1 count each), felonious assault (1 count each), endangering children (3 counts each). David Carroll was also charged with one count of gross abuse of a corpse.

== Trials ==
Liz Carroll was found guilty of all charges on February 21, 2007. The jury, made up of nine women and four men, deliberated for 4–6 hours. The trial lasted for 10 days beginning on February 12, 2007, and ending on February 21, 2007. Her lawyer Gregory A. Cohen promised to appeal. The appeal was also over a report that a juror reportedly said in an interview that she "knew in her heart Liz Carroll was guilty".

During closing comments the assistant prosecutor Daniel Breyer said: "They say you wouldn't treat a dog like that, and you know what? She [Liz] wouldn't! She took the dog with her. She took the dog with her." He referred to the Carrolls taking their dog with them to their family reunion, but leaving Fiesel at home. After the assistant prosecutor's closing remarks Liz Carroll said: "The dog was alive!"

She was sentenced to 54 years to life on February 22, 2007.

After accepting a plea deal, David Carroll plead guilty to murder and gross abuse of a corpse. The judge accepted his plea, and sentenced Carroll to 15 years to life in prison. Carroll said that Amy Baker bound Fiesel, but he admitted he was present.

On Friday, April 20, 2007, the Commonwealth of Kentucky charged Amy Baker with evidence tampering. Prosecutors in Kentucky claim that the immunity she was given was only with the state of Ohio and Kentucky has jurisdiction over the Ohio River. She waived extradition and defended charges brought against her in Kentucky, which carry a maximum five-year sentence. Her attorneys are moved both to dismiss all charges against her and to suppress all testimony given by her in the prosecutions of Liz and David Carroll and alleged that the Kentucky prosecutor promised Ohio prosecutors to give Amy Baker immunity in Kentucky as well. Her trial was set for November 7, 2007, in Maysville, Kentucky. Her charges were then dropped in early 2008.

== Memorials ==
On Saturday, April 21, 2007, the chimney which was used to burn Fiesel's remains was demolished and turned into a memorial to him in a peaceful setting. As of October 2007 the memorial was taken down by the land owner due to excessive litter.

In Hanlon Park-Georgetown, Ohio, a bench was dedicated to his memory on what would have been his 4th birthday, June 24, 2007.

On June 23, 2007, at Beech Acres Park in Cincinnati, Ohio, Anderson Park District dedicated part of an all-children's playground in Fiesel's name.

== Effects on foster care in Ohio ==
The case of Fiesel's death has led to many questions over the placement of foster children within the state of Ohio and elsewhere. Lifeway, the agency that placed Fiesel with the Carrolls, had its license revoked. Several bills have been put before the United States Congress and investigations continue into why Fiesel was placed with the Carrolls. Many placement organizations have since modified their procedures and intensified their background screening for potential foster parents. In all, state legislators, foster care workers, and child advocates have recommended 55 changes to Ohio's foster care system.

== See also ==
- List of solved missing person cases (2000s)
