= Murder in Ohio law =

Murder in Ohio constitutes the unlawful killing, under circumstances defined by law, of people within or under the jurisdiction of the U.S. state of Ohio.

The United States Centers for Disease Control and Prevention reported that in the year 2021, the state had a murder rate somewhat above the median for the entire country.

== Definitions ==
=== Murder ===
Standard murder in Ohio is the second most serious homicide offense, which constitutes when someone purposely causes the death of another person without justification, or the unlawful termination of another person's pregnancy.

Ohio's felony murder rule constitutes when someone commits a first- or second-degree felony, besides voluntary or involuntary manslaughter, in the course of or causing another person's death.

Standard murder in Ohio has a mandatory minimum sentence of 15 years in prison, and a maximum sentence of life imprisonment with the possibility of parole after 25 years.

=== Aggravated murder ===
Aggravated murder in Ohio is the most serious homicide offense in Ohio, which constitutes when someone purposely causes the death of another person or an unlawful termination of another's pregnancy under one of the following aggravated circumstances:

- The murder was committed with prior calculation and design
- The murder was committed during or as a result of the commission or attempted commission of the crime of kidnapping, rape, aggravated arson, arson, aggravated robbery, robbery, aggravated burglary, burglary, trespass in a habitation when a person is present or likely to be present, terrorism, or prison escape
- The victim was under the age of 13
- The murder was committed while the perpetrator was already imprisoned for another felony
- The victim was specifically targeted as a police officer, first responder, or military member

Aggravated murder in Ohio is punishable for adult offenders by either life imprisonment without the possibility of parole or the death penalty, though incumbent governor Mike DeWine has put a moratorium on the death penalty in Ohio until the state can institute an execution method other than lethal injection. For juvenile offenders, it is punishable only by life imprisonment with the possibility of parole after 25 to 30 years.

== Penalties ==
The penalties for homicide offenses in Ohio are listed below.

Offense	Mandatory sentence
Negligent homicide	Up to 6 months in jail
Reckless homicide	9 months to 3 years in prison
Second-degree involuntary manslaughter	9 months to 3 years in prison
Aggravated vehicular homicide	3 to 21 years in prison
First-degree involuntary manslaughter	3 to 21 years in prison
Voluntary manslaughter	3 to 21 years in prison
Murder	15 years in prison to life-with-parole after 25 years
Aggravated murder	For adults: Death (de jure) or life imprisonment with no possibility of parole For juveniles: Life-without-parole for 25 to 30 years
