= Mary Carroll (netball) =

Australian netball player

Mary Janet Carroll (née Hutchinson) was an elite netball player for Australia. She played for Australia in the early 1960s playing with Norma Plummer.
