= Tony Carroll (footballer) =

Scottish footballer

Personal information
- Full name: James Carroll
- Date of birth: 31 October 1906
- Place of birth: Glasgow, Scotland
- Height: 5 ft 6 in (1.68 m)
- Position: Winger

Senior career*
| Years | Team | Apps | (Gls) |
- Strathclyde
- Belfast Celtic
- Shelbourne
| –1935 | Clyde | | |
| 1935–1938 | Leicester City | 97 | (26) |
| 1938 | Luton Town | | |
- Ayr United
- * Club domestic league appearances and goals

James "Tony" Carroll was a Scottish professional footballer who played for Strathclyde, Belfast Celtic, Shelbourne, Clyde, Leicester City, Luton Town and Ayr United. A small and fast winger, he was part of a Leicester City team that won Football League Division Two in 1936–37. During World War II he was declared "Lost at Sea" but was rescued, and went on to work as a crane operator in Glasgow.

== Honours ==
Leicester City Football League Division Two champions: 1936–37
