= Ted Carroll (cartoonist) =

American cartoonist (1904–1973)

- Born: Theodore Carroll; July 6, 1904; New York City, New York, U.S.
- Died: January 11, 1973 (aged 68); New York City, New York, U.S.
- Burial place: Long Island National Cemetery
- Occupation: Cartoonist
- Honors: International Boxing Hall of Fame (2013)

Ted Carroll (July 6, 1904 – January 11, 1973) was an American cartoonist and sportswriter. He was inducted into the International Boxing Hall of Fame in 2013.

== Early life and education ==
Theodore Carroll was born on July 6, 1904, in New York City, New York, United States.

Carroll spent his early years in Greenwich Village. In his youth, he played basketball, ran track, and sketched boxing, hockey, and racehorses. He later earned his diploma from the High School of Commerce in New York. After high school, he was denied admission when he applied to the Art Students League of New York.

== Career ==
Early on, he worked at the Greenwich House in New York City, where he was the first basketball coach of Frank McGuire.

=== Newspaper work ===
He turned his love of sports and drawing into a profession as a sports cartoonist. Primarily self-taught, he began producing illustrations for newspapers and magazines by the mid-1920s. His debut cartoon was published in the N. Y. Bulletin. He was among the first Black artists to work on a daily newspaper in New York. Carroll worked for the Brooklyn Daily Times from 1926 to 1933.

His illustrations were featured for years by E. Hughes at the New York Evening Telegram prior to the Scripps-Howard Syndicate's takeover. Hughes brought him onto the Brooklyn Citizen staff in February 1930, where he became the only Black person in that position, contributing cartoons to the sports section.

He worked for the Brooklyn Daily Eagle from 1933 to 1937. His work also appeared in the New York Amsterdam News and several other publications.

=== The Ring magazine ===
By 1935, he was the exclusive cartoonist for The Ring. He worked closely with its founder, Nat Fleischer, and also contributed articles on professional boxing to the magazine. The magazine published his debut story, "Fighters Who Fight," in June 1936. Carroll's artwork appeared in The Ring for more than 50 years.

Carroll led a 1939 initiative at the Greenwich House, assisted by baseball player Joe DiMaggio and ex-heavyweight boxing champion James J. Braddock.

He became the first artist hired by Madison Square Garden. The New York cartoonist handled publicity illustrations for the boxing department of Madison Square Garden, collaborating closely with Harry Markson.

During World War II, Carroll served in the United States Army Air Forces. In 1943, he began to contribute regularly to the Mitchel Field Beacon, a weekly newspaper at the Mitchel Field, where he was a First-Class Private. He earned the rank of first lieutenant before his eventual discharge.

Upon his return from military service, he continued developing an illustrated book he had started prior to the war. In April 1947, he published a graphic novel containing the pictorial biographies of Jack Dempsey and Joe Louis. The publication, titled Ring Career: Jack Dempsey "The Manassa Mauler" vs. Joe Louis "The Brown Bomber," comprised 400 drawings.

Throughout the 1950s, CBS News purchased dozens of his cartoons annually for distribution to newspapers and magazines. Around 1958, he was hired to create illustrations for the columns of New York Daily Mirror sports editor Dan Parker.

At the height of his career, he appeared as the subject of the December 1959 issue of Ebony magazine. He commented in the article, "If my career, such as it is, can help make this a better country for all, it will have been well spent."

=== Horse racing ===
Carroll sketched racehorses for New York racetracks in addition to his boxing work. He worked on illustrations for Roosevelt Raceway in the late 1950s. Later in life, he exhibited his paintings of thoroughbreds at the Aqueduct Racetrack during the summer of 1972. The exhibition came at the insistence of Sam Kanchuger. Among his most notable works were paintings of Eddie Arcaro riding Assault, as well as Nashua and Whirlaway, along with drawings of Gallant Bloom and Braulio Baeza.

== Personal life ==
Carroll was a resident of the Washington Heights neighborhood of Manhattan in New York City for two decades.

He befriended Burris Jenkins Jr., of the New York Journal-American. He once arranged a dinner in Harlem in honor of Jenkins Jr. in April 1942. Among those in attendance were Dan Burley, Sugar Ray Robinson, and Joe Louis. He was also a personal friend of sportswriter Jimmy Cannon.

== Death and legacy ==
Carroll died on January 11, 1973, at Roosevelt Hospital in New York City, New York, United States, at 66. He was buried in Long Island National Cemetery.

In his era, he emerged as one of the first Black artists to achieve recognition as a sports cartoonist. He was posthumously inducted into the International Boxing Hall of Fame in 2013.
