= Mike Carroll (footballer) =

Scottish footballer

Personal information
- Full name: Michael Carroll
- Date of birth: 10 September 1952 (age 74)
- Place of birth: Aberdeen, Scotland
- Position: Forward

Senior career*
Years	Team	Apps	(Gls)
1970–1971	Liverpool	0	(0)
1971–1972	Grimsby Town	1	(0)
1972–197?	Louth United		
- * Club domestic league appearances and goals

Michael Carroll (born 10 September 1952) is a Scottish professional footballer who played as a forward in the Football League.
