= Ted Carroll (footballer) =

Australian rules footballer

Personal information
- Full name: Edward Carroll
- Born: 11 July 1955 (age 71)
- Original teams: St Pats College, Sale
- Height: 183 cm (6 ft 0 in)
- Weight: 78 kg (172 lb)

Playing career^{1}
Years	Club	Games (Goals)
1973	Footscray	1 (0)
1974–77	Melbourne	31 (12)
1978	Collingwood	3 (0)
Total		35 (12)
- ^{1} Playing statistics correct to the end of 1978.

Edward "Ted" Carroll (born 11 July 1955) is a former Australian rules footballer who played with Footscray, Melbourne and Collingwood in the Victorian Football League (VFL).

He later played in the Victorian Football Association for Springvale. He kicked 118 goals in the 1982 season, to be the VFA Division 2 leading goalkicker for the year.
