= Bishop's House, Birmingham =

Former episcopal residence in Birmingham, England

Bishop's House
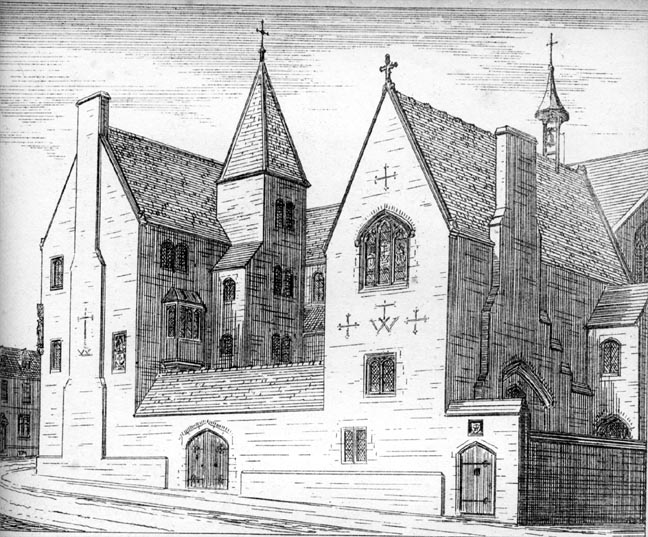
- A drawing, by Pugin, of the House, from his Present State of Ecclesiastical Architecture
- Interactive map of the Bishop's House area

General information
- Architectural style: Gothic Revival architecture
- Coordinates: 52°29′6.11″N 1°53′53.52″W
- Year built: 1840
- Demolished: 1959

Design and construction
- Architect: Augustus Pugin

The Bishop's House in Birmingham, England was designed by Augustus Pugin as the residence of Thomas Walsh, the first Roman Catholic Bishop of Birmingham. It was situated opposite St Chad's Cathedral, on the corner of Bath Street and Weaman Street in Birmingham City Centre.

A building of exceptional originality and adventurousness, it was Pugin's first attempt to adapt his gothic architectural style to form an urban architectural language, and it would become the most influential of all his architectural works. Its influence would be important in the development of the Ruskinian High Victorian Gothic pioneered by William Butterfield at All Saints, Margaret Street; its simple use of traditional materials saw the first emergence of the design philosophy that would later lead to Philip Webb's Red House and the origins of the Arts and Crafts Movement; and its functionalism marked the birth of the tradition of rational construction in architecture that was to dominate the modernist architecture of the 20th century.

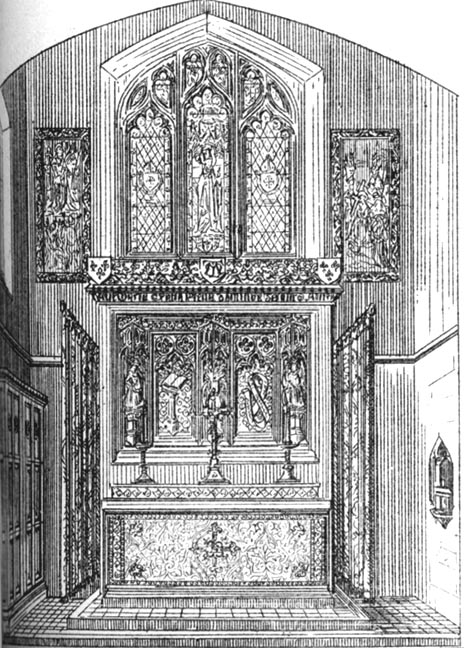
Pugin's drawing of the altar, from Present State of Ecclesiastical Architecture

The house was designed in late 1840, with its overall arrangement being based on the courtyard houses of northern France, but with a strikingly original internal layout, taking a spiral route from the building's front door, all the way round all four sides of the building to the great hall, which was immediately above the main entrance to the right. Its elevations were "sheer, austere and disciplined" with little decoration apart from stone dressings and small areas of patterned brickwork. Pugin emphasised the buildings functionalism, noting "that convenience has dictated the design, and that the elevation has been left in that natural irregularity produced by the internal requirements to which we owe the picturesque effect of the ancient buildings." The quality of its brickwork was unprecedented in England at the time. The house's furniture was also designed by Pugin and was based on surviving mediaeval originals from the Bishop's Palace in Wells.

The house was demolished in 1959, after Birmingham City Engineer Herbert Manzoni demanded that the Roman Catholic Archdiocese of Birmingham pay for any alterations to the city's inner ring road scheme that would be required to avoid the building's demolition. The chimneypiece and two chairs from the Bishop's House are now held in the collection of the Victoria and Albert Museum in London.

== Bibliography ==
- Brittain-Catlin, Timothy (2008), "The Bishop's House, Birmingham", Studies in Victorian Architecture and Design: 96–105
- Hill, Rosemary (2008), God's Architect: Pugin and the Building of Romantic Britain, Harmondsworth: Penguin, ISBN 978-0140280999
- Saint, Andrew (1995), "Pugin's Architecture in Context", in Atterbury, Paul (ed.), A. W. N. Pugin: Master of Gothic Revival, New Haven, CT: Yale University Press, pp. 79–102, ISBN 0300066562
