= St Osburg's Church, Coventry =

St Osburg's Church
- Most Holy Sacrament and St Osburg Church
- The church in April 2025
- St Osburg's Church
- 52.4109°N 1.5195°W
- OS grid reference: SP 32778 79317
- Location: Coventry
- Country: England
- Denomination: Roman Catholic
- Website: SsMaryandBenedict.org.uk

History
- Status: Active
- Founder: Bishop William Ullathorne OSB
- Dedication: Osburh of Coventry

Architecture
- Functional status: Parish church
- Heritage designation: Grade II listed
- Designated: 24 June 1974
- Architect: Charles Hansom
- Style: Gothic Revival
- Groundbreaking: 1843
- Completed: 9 September 1845

Administration
- Province: Birmingham
- Diocese: Birmingham
- Deanery: Coventry

St Osburg's Church also known as the Church of the Most Holy Sacrament and St Osburg, is a Roman Catholic parish church in Coventry, West Midlands. It was built from 1843 to 1845 and was designed by Charles Hansom. It is situated in the city centre on the junction between Holyhead Road and the Coventry Ring Road. It was founded by the Benedictines from Downside Abbey and is a Grade II listed building.

== Construction ==
In 1841, a monk of Downside Abbey, William Ullathorne OSB, came to Coventry from Australia, where he was Vicar General. When he arrived in Coventry, there was a small chapel, dedicated to St Lawrence and St Mary, on the site of the present church. He set about planning for the construction of the church and got Charles Hansom to design it. Construction started in 1843 and was finished two years later. On 9 September 1845, the church was consecrated by the Vicar Apostolic of the Midland District, Nicholas Wiseman. On 21 June 1846, Ullathorne became Vicar Apostolic of the Western District and the ceremony was held in the church, in attendance was John Henry Newman.

== World War II ==
On 14 November 1940, parts of the city was bombed during an air raid. The church's roof, chancel, east side masonry and all the windows and furnishings were destroyed. Until 1944, the church was in partial ruins. That year the chancel ruins were separated from the nave allowing services to temporarily resume.

In the 1950s, all of the stained glass windows were replaced. They were bought from Earley and Company. Cardinal Bernard Griffin re-opened the Church when all the restoration had finished.

== Parish ==
The Benedictines from Downside served the parish until 1926, when it passed to the monks of Douai Abbey before being handed over to the Archdiocese of Birmingham in 1992. In 2008, the Apostles of Jesus were invited by the archdiocese to serve the church and the nearby parishes. Priests from the Apostles of Jesus also administer St Elizabeth's Church and Saints Mary and Benedict's Church in the city.

Saints Mary and Benedict's Church was also founded by the English Benedictine Congregation. Its foundation stone was laid on 9 February 1893 and it was opened on 21 November 1893. It was opened by Cardinal Herbert Vaughan.

St Elizabeth's Church was designed by Harrison & Cox. It opened in 1912, and reconsecrated in 1962.

There are two Sunday Masses held in St Osburg's Church: Saturday 5:30pm and Sunday 11.30am. Saints Mary and Benedict's Church has its Sunday Masses at 9.30am and 11.30am and St Elizabeth's Church has its Sunday Masses at 9am and 11:15am.

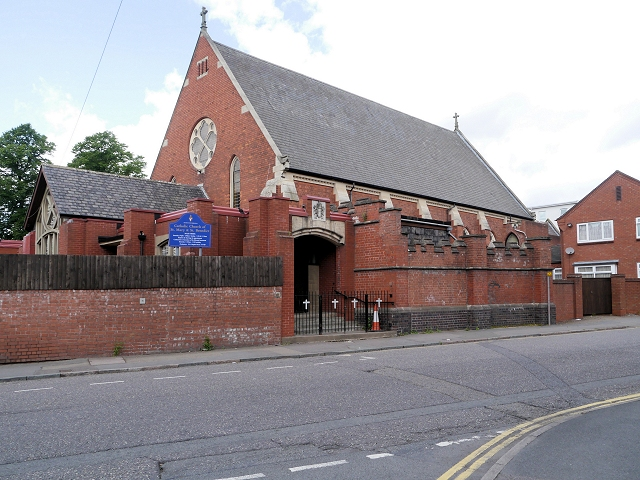
St Mary and St Benedict Church, Coventry

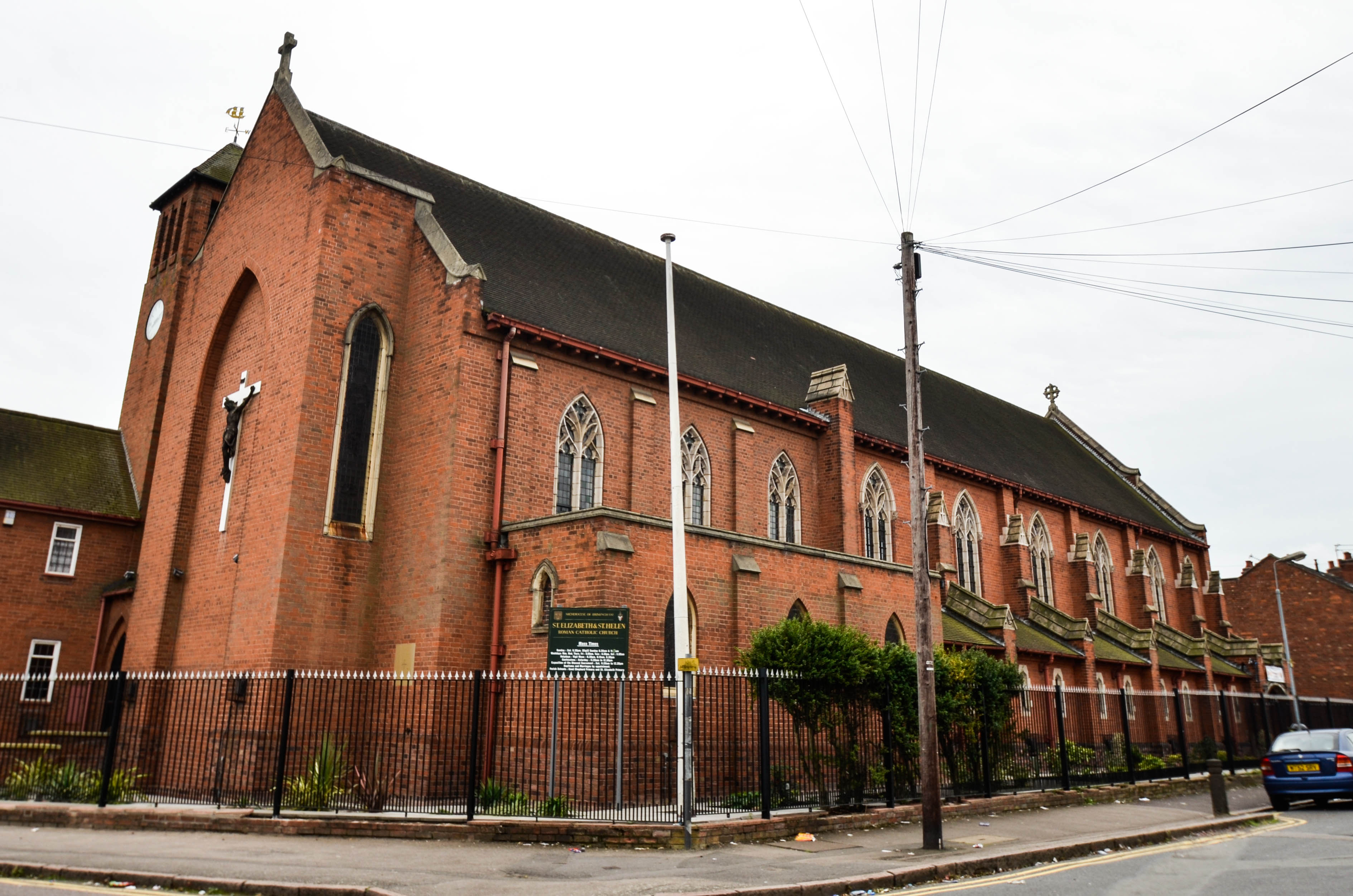
St Elizabeth's Church, Coventry

== See also ==
- Roman Catholic Archdiocese of Birmingham
