= Malta George Cross Memorial =

War memorial in the City of London

Coordinates: 51°30′33.89″N 0°4′47.63″W

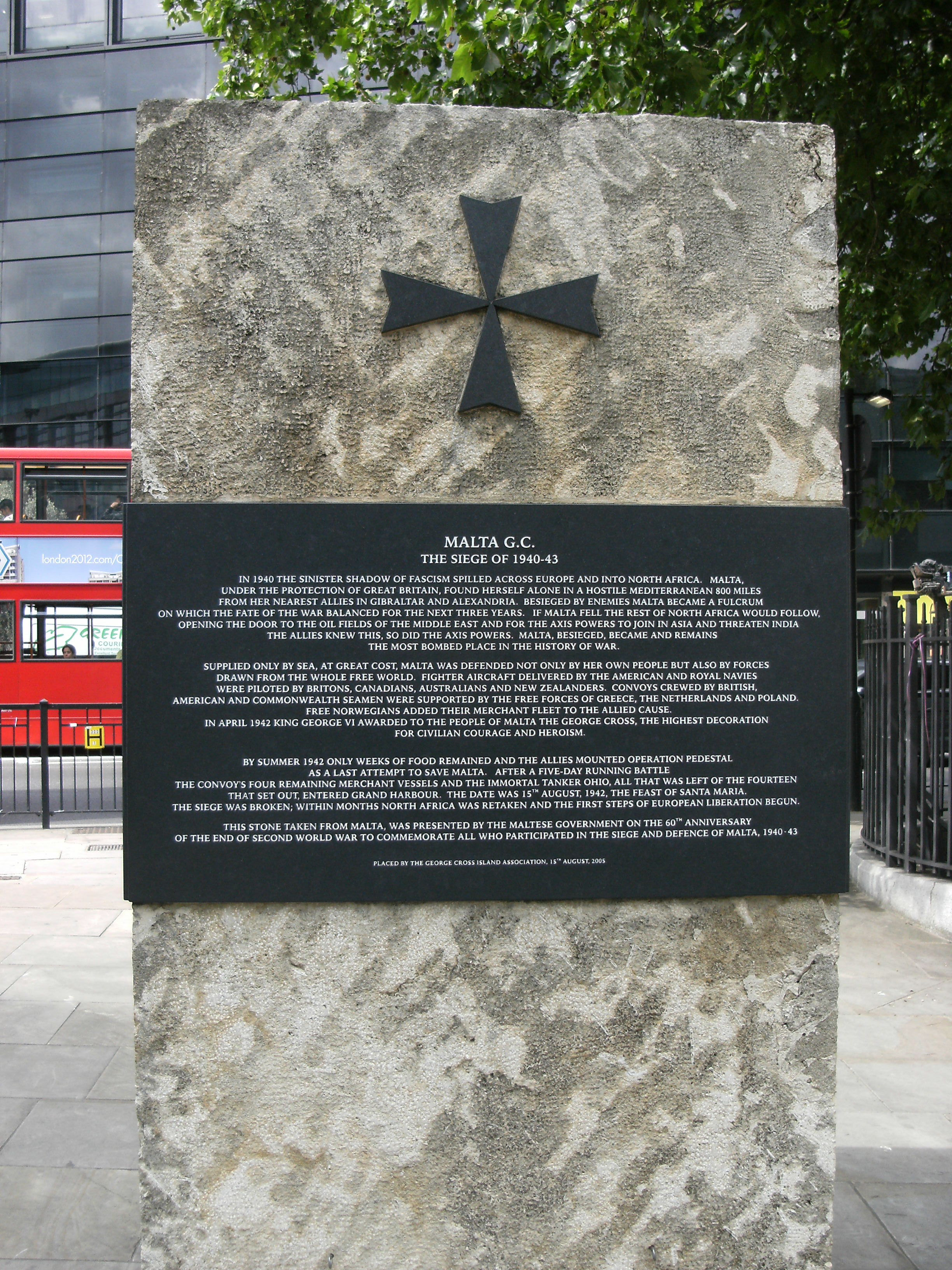
Malta George Cross Memorial

The Malta George Cross Memorial, also known as the Maltese Memorial, is a war memorial in London. It was erected to commemorate the siege of Malta in the Second World War, which led to the island's being collectively awarded the George Cross in April 1942. Unveiled in 2005, it stands near the church of All Hallows-by-the-Tower.

The memorial is constructed from a large rectangular monolithic block of limestone from the Maltese island of Gozo. The block stands 3 metres (9.8 ft) high and weighs 8.5 tons. It bears an inscribed black slate panel on each of its four sides. The main panel to the southeast recounts the siege of Malta from 1940 to 1943, and the consequent loss of 7,000 lives of Maltese civilians and Allied and Commonwealth service personnel. A Maltese cross is displayed above this main panel. Further details of the siege are inscribed on a second panel on the northwest face of the memorial. The panel to the northeast gives details of the awarding of the George Cross, and that to the southwest has a map illustrating the Allied operations in the Mediterranean Sea.

The stone was presented by the Government of Malta and erected by the George Cross Island Association in 2005, for the 60th anniversary of the end of the Second World War. It was unveiled on 15 August 2005 by the President of Malta Eddie Fenech Adami, and dedicated by Vincent Nichols, then the Roman Catholic Archbishop of Birmingham, with a wreath laid by Prince Philip, Duke of Edinburgh. The date was the 63rd anniversary of the arrival of the last surviving ship of the Operation Pedestal convoy at Valletta Grand Harbour that provided critical supplies during the siege. The unveiling was attended by approximately 100 veterans of the Malta campaign, and representatives of Allied and Commonwealth forces.

The stone was a bright white colour when it was unveiled, but has weathered and darkened.

There is a further memorial to the George Cross Island Association at the National Memorial Arboretum at Alrewas near Lichfield, and one in the Peace Garden of the former Anglican Church of St Luke, Liverpool.

== See also ==
- Malta Memorial
- War Memorial (Floriana)
- George Cross Island Association § Siege Bell Memorial
