= Joseph Masterson =

Catholic archbishop (1899–1953)

The Most Reverend Joseph Masterson
- Archbishop of Birmingham
- Province: Birmingham
- See: Birmingham
- Installed: 19 March 1947
- Term ended: 30 November 1953
- Predecessor: Thomas Leighton Williams
- Successor: Francis Joseph Grimshaw

Orders
- Ordination: 27 July 1924
- Consecration: 8 February 1947 by Bernard Griffin

Personal details
- Born: 29 January 1899 Manchester, England
- Died: 30 November 1953 (aged 54) Edgbaston, England
- Buried: St Mary's College, Oscott
- Denomination: Roman Catholic Church

Joseph Masterson (29 January 1899 – 30 November 1953) was an English Roman Catholic prelate who served as Archbishop of Birmingham from 1947 to 1953.

Masterson was born in Ardwick, Manchester, England, the son of William Masterson, an Irish immigrant shopkeeper and his wife Celia. From 1910, he was educated at the Xaverian College, Rusholme until January 1915 when he was accepted as a student of the Diocese of Salford and continued his studies for a term at St Bede's College, Manchester, then at Douai School where he was captain of cricket and football.

He was ordained a priest on 27 July 1924 at the Cenacle Convent, Manchester. Following ordination he studied for two years at the English College, Rome. Returning to England in 1926 Fr Masterson served nine years as curate at St Mary's, Mulberry Street, Manchester, then five years as curate at The English Martyrs, Whalley Range. In 1940 he was appointed Parish Priest at St. Mary's of The Angels and St. Clare, Levenshulme.

He was elevated Archbishop of Birmingham on 8 February 1947 and was installed on 19 March 1947. His principal consecrator was Cardinal Bernard Griffin, co-consecrators Bishop of Salford Henry Vincent Marshall and Bishop of Soli Humphrey Bright. On 15 June 1952 he spoke at a Family Prayer Crusade Rally held at Aston Villa football ground alongside Rev. Patrick Peyton, Prof. Thomas Bodkin and Ken Mackey.

Masterson died in office on 30 November 1953, aged 54, at Archbishop's House in Edgbaston. He received a Requiem Mass on 6 December 1953, presided over by Cardinal Griffin, ahead of burial at St Mary's College, Oscott.
