= Richard Walker (bishop) =

English Roman Catholic bishop (born 1960)

The Right Reverend Richard Walker
- Auxiliary Bishop of Birmingham
- Church: Roman Catholic Church
- Archdiocese: Birmingham
- Appointed: 25 April 2024
- In office: 2024–present
- Other posts: Vicar general of the Archdiocese of Birmingham (since 2020); Titular Bishop of Murthlacum (2024–present)

Orders
- Ordination: 22 July 2000 by Vincent Nichols
- Consecration: 16 July 2024 by Bernard Longley

Personal details
- Born: Richard Adrian Walker; 24 October 1960 (age 65) Harborne, Birmingham, England
- Education: Coventry University, St Mary's College, Oscott, Venerable English College, Pontifical Gregorian University

Richard Adrian Walker (born 24 October 1960) is an English Roman Catholic prelate who has served as an Auxiliary Bishop of the Archdiocese of Birmingham and titular bishop of Murthlacum since 2024. Before his appointment to the episcopate, he served as Vicar General of the Archdiocese of Birmingham since 2020.

== Early life and education ==
Walker was born on 24 October 1960 in Harborne, Birmingham. He qualified as a solicitor in 1985, after a degree in law from Coventry University, before entering priestly formation at St Mary's College, Oscott and the Venerable English College in Rome. In 2000 he was awarded the Licentiate in Dogmatic Theology (STL) from the Pontifical Gregorian University.

== Priestly ministry ==
Walker was ordained to the priesthood for the Archdiocese of Birmingham by Archbishop Vincent Nichols at St Francis Church, Kenilworth, on 22 July 2000.

Following ordination, he served as assistant priest at Christ the King Parish, Coventry (2000–2003). He then joined the staff of St Mary's College, Oscott, where he served until 2014, including most of that period as vice rector. From 2014 to 2020 he was parish priest of St John the Evangelist, Banbury, while also serving as Director of Ongoing Formation for the archdiocese from 2015. Between 2018 and 2020 he additionally served as parish priest of St Joseph the Worker, Banbury. He was appointed Vicar General and trustee of the Archdiocese of Birmingham in September 2020.

== Episcopal ministry ==
On 25 April 2024, Pope Francis appointed Walker auxiliary bishop of the Archdiocese of Birmingham and titular bishop of Murthlacum.

He received episcopal consecration on 16 July 2024 in St Chad's Cathedral, Birmingham. The principal consecrator was Archbishop Bernard Longley, assisted by Bishop David Ernest Charles Evans and Bishop Stephen Wright.

Following his ordination as bishop, Walker was given pastoral responsibility for the deaneries and parishes of Coventry, Warwickshire and Oxfordshire.
