= Cardinal Griffin Catholic College =

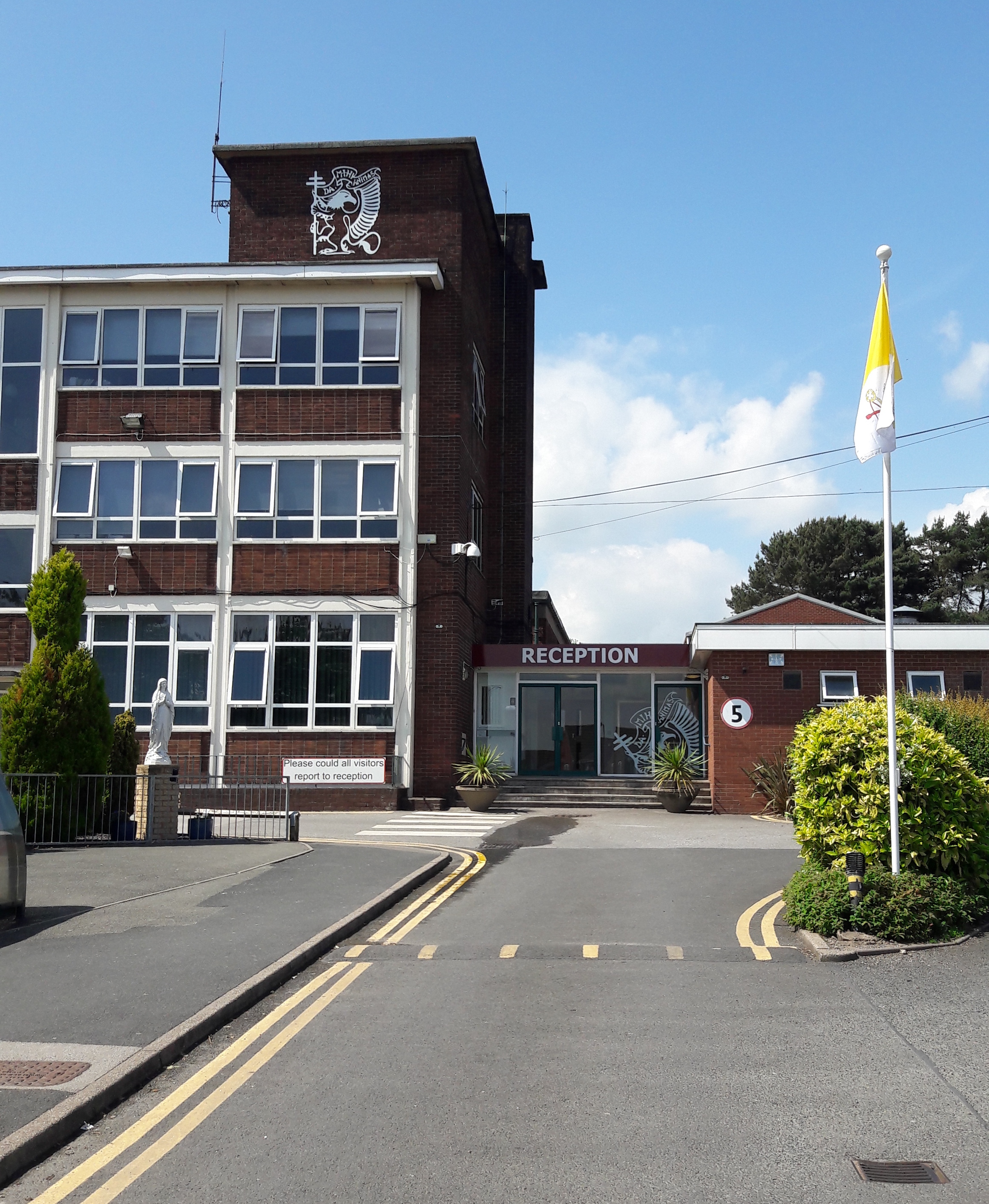
- College building

Location
- Cardinal Way; Cannock, Staffordshire, WS11 4AW; England; 52.697°N 2.036°W

Information
- Type: Academy
- Motto: Latin: Da Mihi Animas (Give Me Souls)
- Religious affiliation: Roman Catholic
- Established: 1960; 66 years ago
- Local authority: Staffordshire
- Trust: The Painsley Catholic Academy Trust
- Department for Education URN: 149989 Tables
- Ofsted: Reports
- Head teacher: Mr Paul Johnson
- Gender: Coeducational
- Age: 11 to 18
- Enrolment: 870 as of August 2023
- Houses: Six
- Colours: Black and Red
- Publication: The Griffin
- Website: www.cardinalgriffin.staffs.sch.uk

Cardinal Griffin Catholic College is a coeducational Catholic Secondary school and sixth form located in Cannock, Staffordshire, England.

== History ==
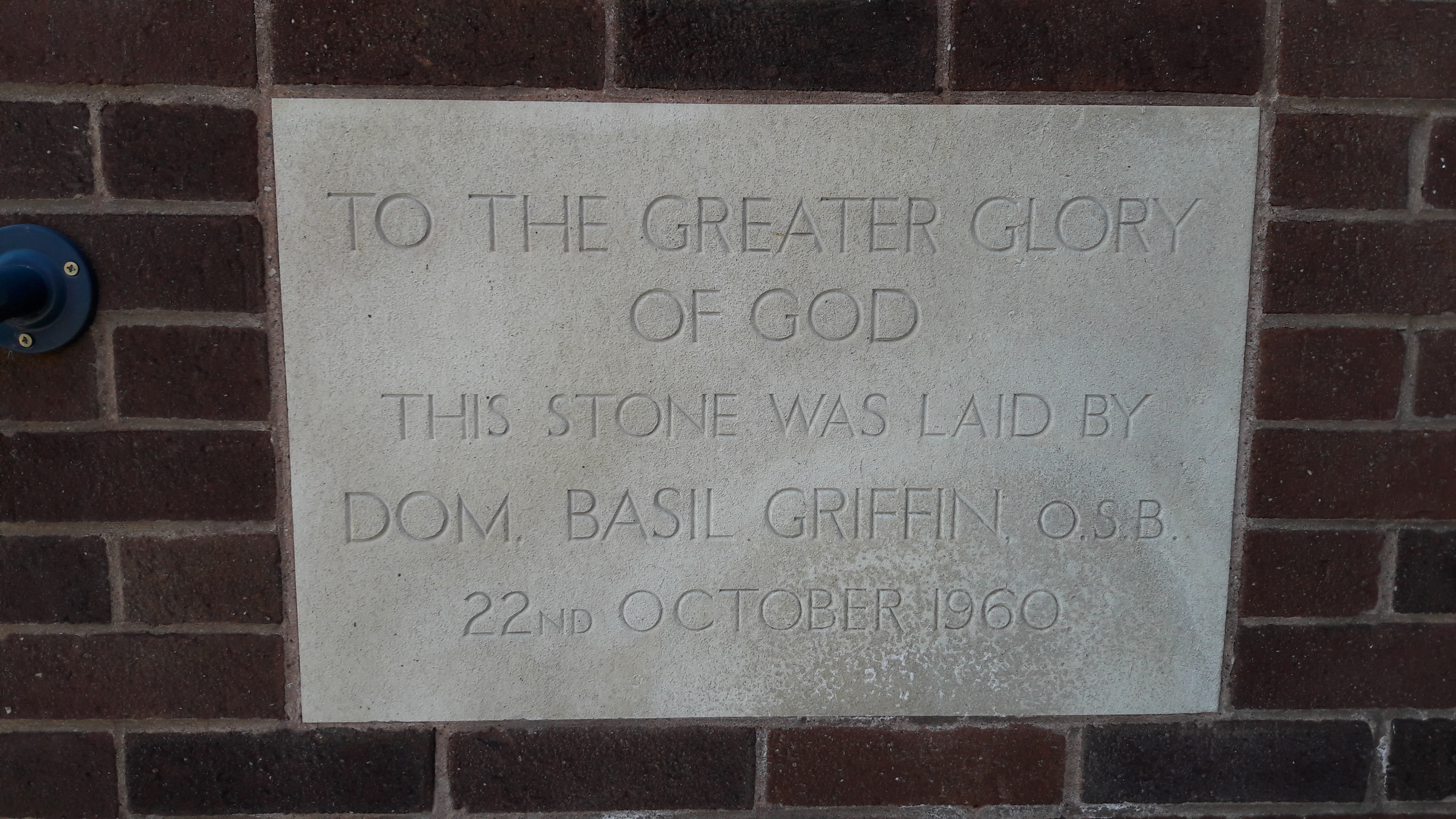
Foundation stone

On 22 October 1960, the foundation stone of the college was laid by Dom Basil Griffin OSB (died 1963). He was a monk at Douai Abbey in Woolhampton, Berkshire, and twin brother of Cardinal Griffin, who the college was named after. The college was built to educate the children of the four Catholic parishes in Cannock Chase. Those parishes were St Mary and St Thomas More in Cannock, Our Lady of Lourdes in Hednesford, St Joseph and Etheldreda in Rugeley and St Joseph in Burntwood.

The school has a house system that names each of the six school houses after past cardinals of the Catholic church in England. The houses are Allen, Newman, Manning, Vaughan, Wiseman and Hinsley.

The college has played the sport of Handball since 1980s. In 1982, they won the national under-15s final and in the early 1980s came fourth in the under-14 championship of a Europe-wide Handball tournament in Teramo.

In 2010 an observatory with two domes and what has been called the "largest collection of telescopes in the Midlands" was built on the school grounds. It was opened by Brother Guy Consolmagno SJ, the official Vatican Astronomer.

In 2013, Ofsted inspected the school and rated it in overall effectiveness as 'Good' and behaviour and safety of pupils as 'Outstanding'. The overall effectiveness was an improvement from its previous inspection, which was rated as 'Satisfactory'.

Previously a voluntary aided school administered by Staffordshire County Council, in September 2023 Cardinal Griffin Catholic College converted to academy status. The school is now sponsored by The Painsley Catholic Academy Trust, but continues to be under the jurisdiction of the Roman Catholic Archdiocese of Birmingham.
