= Bernard Griffin =

English cardinal

His Eminence Bernard Griffin
- Cardinal, Archbishop of Westminster
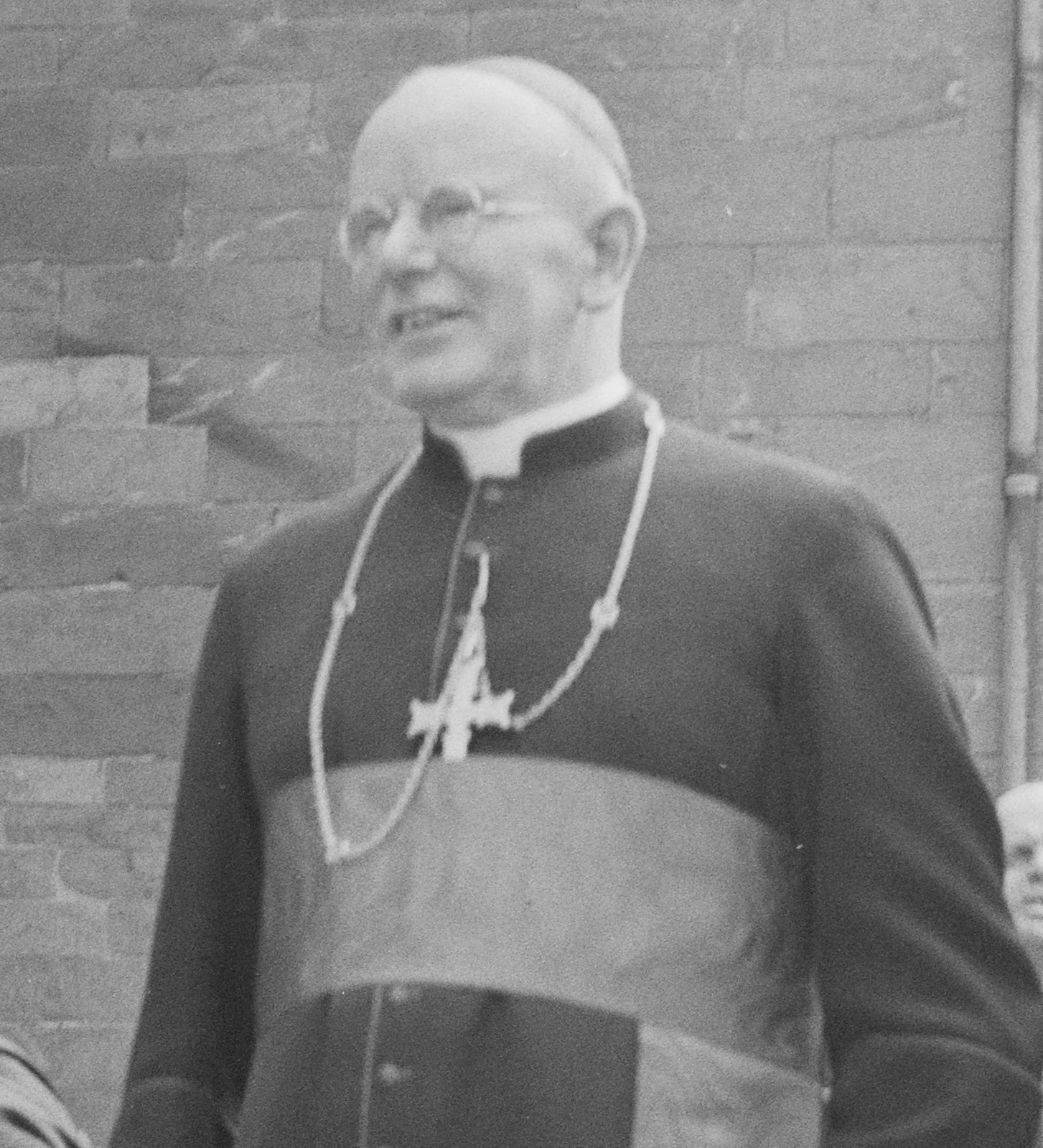
- Cardinal Griffin in 1953
- Church: Roman Catholic Church
- Diocese: Westminster
- Appointed: 18 December 1943
- Term ended: 19 August 1956
- Predecessor: Arthur Hinsley
- Successor: William Godfrey
- Other post: Cardinal Priest of Santi Andrea e Gregorio al Monte Celio
- Previous posts: Titular Bishop of Appia (1938–1943); Auxiliary Bishop of Birmingham (1938–1943)

Orders
- Ordination: 1 November 1924
- Consecration: 30 June 1938 by Thomas Leighton Williams, John Patrick Barrett and William Lee
- Created cardinal: 18 February 1946 by Pius XII
- Rank: Cardinal Priest

Personal details
- Born: Bernard William Griffin; 21 February 1899 Birmingham, Warwickshire, England, United Kingdom of Great Britain and Ireland
- Died: 19 August 1956 (aged 57) New Polzeath, Cornwall, United Kingdom
- Buried: Westminster Cathedral, London, England, United Kingdom
- Denomination: Roman Catholic
- Parents: William Griffin & Helen Swadkins
- Education: English College, Rome
- Motto: Da mihi animas (Give me souls)
- Coat of arms

Styles of Bernard Griffin
- Reference style: His Eminence
- Spoken style: Your Eminence
- Religious style: (autofilled)
- Informal style: Cardinal

Bernard William Griffin (21 February 1899 – 19 August 1956) was an English cardinal of the Roman Catholic Church. He served as Archbishop of Westminster from 1943 until his death, and was created a cardinal in 1946 by Pope Pius XII. As cardinal, Griffin argued for the provision of Catholic schools in the rebuilding of post-war Britain and acted as papal legate to the 1950 centenary of the restoration of the Catholic hierarchy in England.

== Biography ==
Bernard and his twin brother Basil were born in Birmingham to William and Helen (née Swadkins) Griffin. His father was a bicycle manufacturer, Birmingham City councillor and justice of the peace.

When the First World War broke out, Griffin left the seminary to serve in the photographic section of the Royal Naval Air Service. While in the service he suffered his first heart attack, before the age of twenty, but concealed it from the medical authorities, fearing a discharge that would prevent his acceptance for the priesthood; the episode became public only after his death.

After the war Bernard went to Oscott College in Birmingham to train to be a priest. Ordained to the priesthood on 1 November 1924, he finished his studies at the Venerable English College in Rome in 1927. Griffin then worked as private secretary to John McIntyre, the Archbishop of Birmingham, until 1937. From 1929 to 1938, he served as diocesan chancellor of Birmingham, director of studies of the Catholic Evidence Guild, Catholic representative on the BBC's religious advisory committee, and administrator of diocesan charitable homes.

On 26 May 1938, Griffin was appointed Auxiliary Bishop of Birmingham and Titular Bishop of Appia. He received his episcopal consecration on 30 June from Thomas Williams (Archbishop of Birmingham), with John Barrett, Bishop of Plymouth, and William Lee (Bishop of Clifton), serving as co-consecrators, in the Cathedral of Saint Chad, Birmingham. During the Second World War he served as an air-raid warden in Birmingham during the Battle of Britain. Pius XII raised Griffin to Archbishop of Westminster, and thus ranking prelate in the Catholic Church in England and Wales, on 18 December 1943. At his installation Mass in Westminster Cathedral, he defended the sanctity of marriage.

Griffin was created Cardinal-Priest of San Gregorio Magno al Celio by Pius XII in the consistory of 18 February 1946. At age 46, he was the youngest cardinal to be appointed at the ceremony, to which he wore the tailored cappa magna of his deceased predecessor cardinal, Arthur Hinsley. He acted as papal legate to the centennial celebration of the restoration of the Catholic hierarchy in England in 1950.

As cardinal, Griffin took a keen interest in the rebuilding of post-war Britain arguing especially for the provision of Catholic schools. He was seen by some as liberal in areas of social principles. He also supported Sir William Beveridge.

Griffin upheld the doctrine of the perpetual virginity of Mary, and was once a president on the Council of Christians and Jews.

Griffin died from a heart attack in New Polzeath, at age 57, and was buried at Westminster Cathedral.

His coat of arms is blazoned Gules issuant from a barrulet enarched in base a sweet william plant in pale Or supported by a Saint Bernard dog dexter and a griffin wings addorsed sinister Or, thus representing his full name.

On the 22 October 1960, Bernard's twin brother, Basil, laid the foundation stone of Cardinal Griffin Catholic College in Cannock, Staffordshire.

== Assessment ==
Adrian Hastings, an historian of English Christianity, considered Griffin "the least important archbishop of Westminster of the century, a nice, hard-working nonentity". In his history of Cardinal Hume and modern English Catholicism, Peter Stanford described Griffin as "an obscure but talented provincial auxiliary".

Catholic Church titles
Preceded by Arthur Hinsley	Archbishop of Westminster; 1943–1956	Succeeded by William Godfrey
Preceded by Jusztinián György Serédi	Cardinal priest of SS. Andrea e Gregorio al Monte Celio; 1946–1956	Succeeded by John Francis O'Hara
