= Coventry Catholic Deanery =

Roman Catholic Deanery in England

The Coventry Deanery is a Roman Catholic Deanery in the Roman Catholic Archdiocese of Birmingham. Comprising fifteen parishes in the City of Coventry (together with chaplaincy's to both the University of Warwick and University Hospital Coventry), it is part of the Southern pastoral area.

== Key personnel ==
As of 2016, the area bishop is the Rt Rev William Kenney and the area dean is Canon Tom Farrell.

== Parishes ==
| Parish | Parish Priest |
|---|---|
| Christ the King and Our Lady of Lourdes (incorporating St. Augustines), Coundon | Canon Tom Farrell |
| All Souls (Precious Blood and All Souls), Earlsdon | Fr. Michael Brandon |
| Corpus Christi, Ernesford Grange | Fr. David Gnosil |
| Holy Family, Holbrooks | Fr. Patrick Brennan |
| Our Lady of the Assumption, Tile Hill | Fr. Louis Lee-Van-Hong |
| Sacred Heart, Stoke | Fr. Anthony Norton |
| St. Anne, Willenhall | Fr. David Gnosil |
| St. Elizabeth's, Foleshill | Fr. Moses Pitya David AJ |
| St. John Fisher, Wyken | Fr. Robert Wright |
| St. John Vianney, Mount Nod | Fr. Johnathan Veasey |
| St. Joseph the Worker, Cannon Park | Fr. Harry Curtis |
| St. Mary and St Benedict, Coventry | Fr. James Lutwama AJ |
| St. Osburg (The Most Holy Sacrament and St. Osburg), Coventry | Fr. James Lutwama AJ |
| St. Patrick, Bell Green | Fr. George Bennet |
| St. Thomas More, Styvechale | Fr. Stephen Day |

== See also ==
- Rugby Deanery
