= Archbishop Ilsley Catholic School =

Location
- Victoria Road; Birmingham, West Midlands, B27 7XY; England
- 52°26′40″N 1°49′18″W

Information
- Type: Academy
- Motto: Justus et Tenax Propositi - Just and Firm of Purpose
- Religious affiliation: Roman Catholic
- Established: 1957
- Local authority: Birmingham City Council
- Trust: St Teresa of Calcutta Multi-Academy Company
- Department for Education URN: 146124 Tables
- Ofsted: Reports
- Headteacher: Ciaran Clinton
- Gender: Coeducational
- Age: 11 to 18
- Enrolment: 1,192
- Website: http://www.ilsley.bham.sch.uk/

Archbishop Ilsley Catholic School is a coeducational Roman Catholic secondary school and sixth form located in Acocks Green, Birmingham, England.

The school is named after Edward Ilsley, former Archbishop of Birmingham.

== History ==
Construction of the school commenced in 1955 and was completed in 1957. It is named after Archbishop Edward Ilsley, who built the first church in the village of Acocks Green in the early part of the 20th century. The school served many immigrant Catholic families who moved to Birmingham from the west coast of Ireland following World War II. The headteacher is Mr C Clinton.

In 2003, the school was named as one of the best schools nationwide in the Chief Inspector's Report to Parliament. It also received Technology College status. In 2004, it was described as being the "Most Improved" school by the Specialist Schools Trust. The school was also the first winner of the Healthy Schools Award.

Previously a voluntary aided school administered by Birmingham City Council, in May 2019 Archbishop Ilsley Catholic School converted to academy status. The school is now sponsored by the St Teresa of Calcutta Multi-Academy Company.
