= Archbishop Williams =

Archbishop Williams may refer to:

- Rowan Williams, Anglican Archbishop of Canterbury
- Archbishop John Joseph Williams (1822–1907), American Roman Catholic prelate and the first Archbishop of Boston
- John Williams, Archbishop of York (1582–1650), Archbishop of York, 1641–1650
- Thomas Leighton Williams (1877–1946), Roman Catholic archbishop of Birmingham, England
- Thomas Stafford Williams (born 1930), New Zealand Cardinal and Archbishop of Wellington
- Gwilym Owen Williams (1913–1990), Anglican Archbishop of Wales, 1971–1982
- Archbishop Williams High School, a co-educational Catholic school in Braintree, Massachusetts
