= William Bernard Ullathorne =

English prelate (1806–1889)

The Most Reverend William Bernard Ullathorne OSB
- Bishop of Birmingham
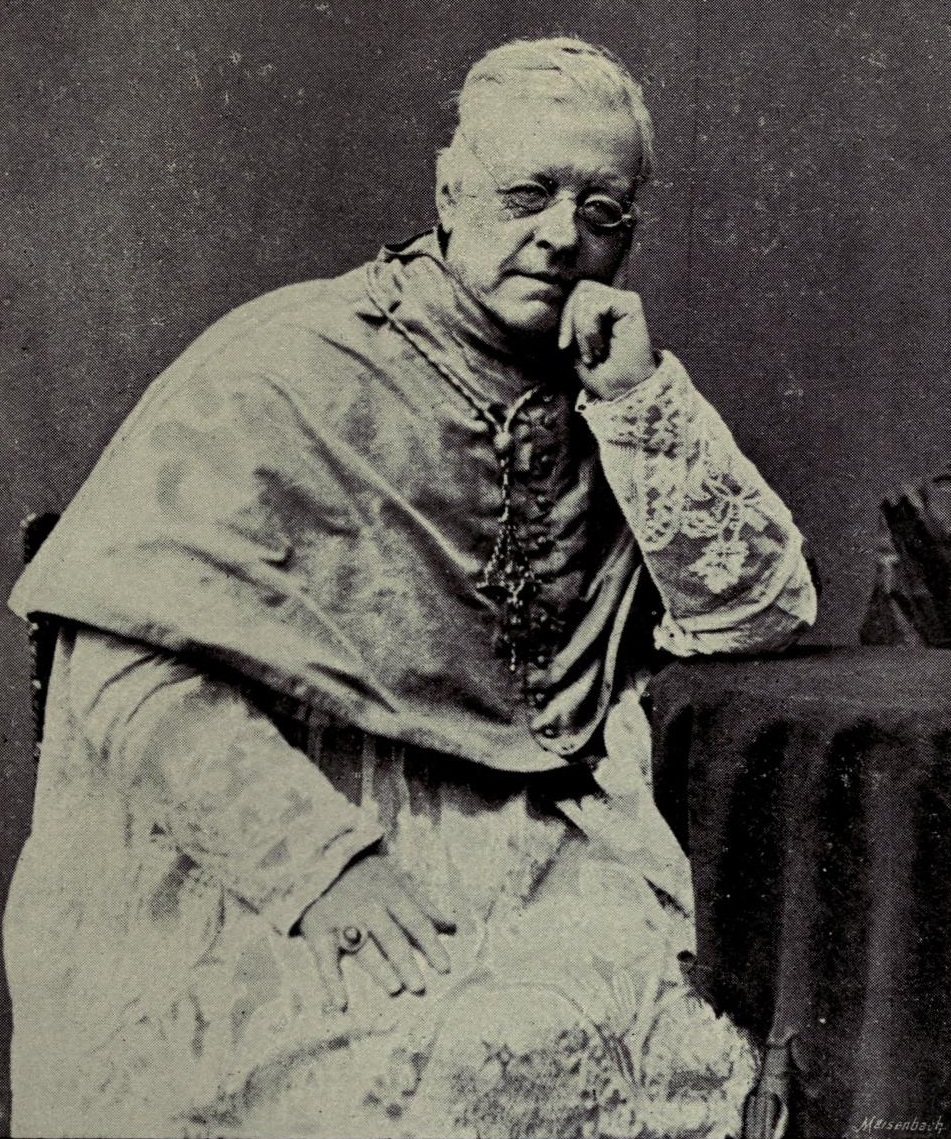
- Church: Latin Church
- Diocese: Birmingham
- Appointed: 29 September 1850
- Term ended: January 1888
- Successor: Edward Ilsley
- Other post: Titular Archbishop of Cabasa

Orders
- Ordination: 24 September 1831
- Consecration: 21 June 1846 by John Briggs

Personal details
- Born: William Ullathorne; 7 May 1806 Pocklington, Yorkshire, England
- Died: 21 March 1889 (aged 82) Oscott College, New Oscott, England
- Buried: Dominican Sisters Convent, Stone, Staffordshire, England
- Denomination: Roman Catholic
- Parents: William Ullathorne and Hannah Ullathorne (née Longstaff)
- Coat of arms

William Bernard Ullathorne OSB (7 May 1806 – 21 March 1889) was an English Catholic prelate who served as Bishop of Birmingham from 1850 to 1888. He was a member of the Benedictines.

== Early life ==
Ullathorne was born in Pocklington, East Riding of Yorkshire, the eldest of ten children of William Ullathorne and Hannah (née Longstaff), who converted to Roman Catholicism when she married. When he was nine years of age, Ullathorne's family relocated to Scarborough, where he began his schooling. He left school at age twelve to manage the accounts at his father's business and later worked as a cabin boy. He was a descendant of Saint Thomas More through his great-grandmother, Mary More.

== Priesthood ==
In 1823 Ullathorne entered the monastery of Downside Abbey, taking the vows in 1825, taking the additional name "Bernard", after Bernard of Clairvaux. He was ordained priest in 1831, and in 1832 went to New South Wales as vicar-general to Bishop William Placid Morris (1794–1872), whose jurisdiction extended over the Australian missions.

Ullathorne was Vicar General of New South Wales from 1832 to 1841, taking charge of St. Mary's parish and church upon his arrival in Sydney, and worked quickly to close divisions among the Catholics.

It was mainly Ullathorne who caused Pope Gregory XVI to establish the hierarchy in Australia. In 1836, Bede Polding sent Ullathorne back to Britain, to recruit more Benedictines. While in England, he presented a report on The Catholic Mission in Australia (1837), and in 1838 was summoned to give evidence before the House of Commons Transportation Committee regarding his 1836 pamphlet,The Horrors of Transportation. Ullathorne had visited the penal colony on Norfolk Island and had seen first hand the cruelty of the convict transportation system.

He also visited Ireland, where he met Mary Aikenhead and later return to Australia in 1838 with five Sisters of Charity.

Ullathorne returned to England in 1841, suffering what Judith F Champ says would in modern terminology be described as "burnout". He then took charge of the Roman Catholic mission at Coventry, where he recovered his health and spirits.

Ullathorne had turned down bishoprics in Hobart, Adelaide, and Perth as he did not wish to return to Australia. In 1847 he was consecrated bishop as Vicar Apostolic of the Western District, in succession to Bishop C.M. Baggs (1806–1845), but was transferred to the Central District in the following year. Ullathorne helped found St Osburg's Church in Coventry.

== Bishop of Birmingham ==
On the re-establishment of the hierarchy in England and Wales, he became the first Roman Catholic Bishop of the Diocese of Birmingham. During his nearly four decades of tenure at the see 67 new churches, 32 convents and nearly 200 mission schools were built. In 1888 he retired and received from Pope Leo XIII the honorary title of Archbishop of Cabasa. He died at Oscott College and his monument is in the crypt of St Chad's Cathedral, Birmingham, although he was buried in the sanctuary of the Church of St Dominic and the Immaculate Conception at Stone, Staffordshire. There is Bishop Ullathorne Catholic School in Coventry which is named after him.

== Works ==
Of Ullathorne's theological and philosophical works, the best known are: The Endowments of Man (1880), The Groundwork of the Christian Virtues (1882), Christian Patience (1886). For an account of his life see his Autobiography, edited by A. T. Drane (London).

- Substance of a Sermon Against Drunkenness Preached to the Catholics of Divers Parts of New South Wales, Dublin: Richard Coyne, 1840.
- Sermons, With Prefaces, London: T. Jones, 1842.
- The Blessing of the Calvary on the Grace Dieu Rocks, London: Charles Dolman, 1843.
- The Office of a Bishop: A Discourse Delivered at the Solemn Thanksgiving for the Re-establishment of the Hierarchy, London: Thomas Richardson and Son, 1850.
- The Immaculate Conception of the Mother of God: An Exposition, London: Richardson and Son, 1855.
- On Certain Methods of the Rambler and the Home and Foreign Review: A Second Letter to the Clergy of the Eiocese of Birmingham, London: Thomas Richardson and Son, 1863.
- History of the restoration of the Catholic hierarchy in England, London: Burns, Oates, and Company, 1871.
- The Döllingerites, Mr. Gladstone, and Apostates From the Faith: A Letter to the Catholics of his Diocese, London: Thomas Richardson and Son, 1874.
- The Endowments of Man Considered in Their Relations With his Final End: A Course of Lectures, London: Burns & Oates, 1880.
- The Groundwork of the Christian Virtues, Burns & Oates, 1882.
- Christian Patience, the Strenghth & Discipline of the Soul, London: Burns & Gates, Limited, 1886.

== Notes ==
Catholic Church titles
Preceded by Charles Michael Baggs	Vicar Apostolic of the Western District; 1846–1848	Succeeded by Joseph William Hendren
Preceded by Thomas Walsh	Vicar Apostolic of the Midland District; 1848–1850	Last appointment
New title	Bishop of Birmingham; 1850–1888	Succeeded by Edward Ilsley
