= John McIntyre (archbishop of Birmingham) =

English prelate

The Most Reverend John McIntyre
- Archbishop of Birmingham
- Church: Roman Catholic Church
- Archdiocese: Roman Catholic Archdiocese of Birmingham
- Province: Province of Birmingham
- Appointed: 16 June 1921
- In office: 5 July 1921 – 17 November 1928
- Predecessor: Edward Ilsley
- Successor: Thomas Leighton Williams

Orders
- Ordination: 22 May 1880
- Consecration: 30 July 1912 by Edward Ilsley

Personal details
- Born: 1 January 1855 Birmingham, Warwickshire, United Kingdom
- Died: 21 November 1934 (aged 79)
- Denomination: Roman Catholic

John McIntyre (1 January 1855 – 21 November 1934) was an English prelate who served as the Roman Catholic Archbishop of Birmingham from 1921 to 1928.

== Early life and ministry ==
Born in Birmingham, he was educated at Sedgley Park School, Wolverhampton, the English College, Douai, St Bernard's Seminary, Olton and the English College, Rome. After his ordination to the priesthood on 22 May 1880, he served at Colwich, Staffordshire, and then alternatively at Oscott and Olton until 1912. Between 1898 and 1912, he was the Vice-Rector at St Mary's College, Oscott.

== Episcopal career ==
He was appointed an auxiliary Bishop of Birmingham and Titular Bishop of Lamus on 24 June 1912. His consecration to the Episcopate took place on 30 July 1912, the principal consecrator was Edward Ilsley, Archbishop of Birmingham, with Francis Mostyn and George Burton as co-consecrators. The next year, he was appointed Rector of the English College, Rome, despite the protests of Edward Ilsley. After five years, he was appointed an official of the Roman Curia and Titular Archbishop of Oxyrynchus on 24 August 1917.

Following Edward Ilsley's retirement, McIntyre was appointed Archbishop of Birmingham on 16 June 1921 and installed at St Chad's Cathedral, Birmingham on 5 July 1921. After seven years as archbishop of the Archdiocese of Birmingham, he was forced to resign due to ill-health on 17 November 1928 and appointed Titular Archbishop of Odessus.

He died on 21 November 1935, aged 79.

Catholic Church titles
Preceded by Edward Ilsley	Archbishop of Birmingham; 1921–1928	Succeeded by Thomas Williams
