= Francis Grimshaw =

English Catholic bishop (1901–1965)

The Most Reverend Francis Grimshaw
- Archbishop of Birmingham
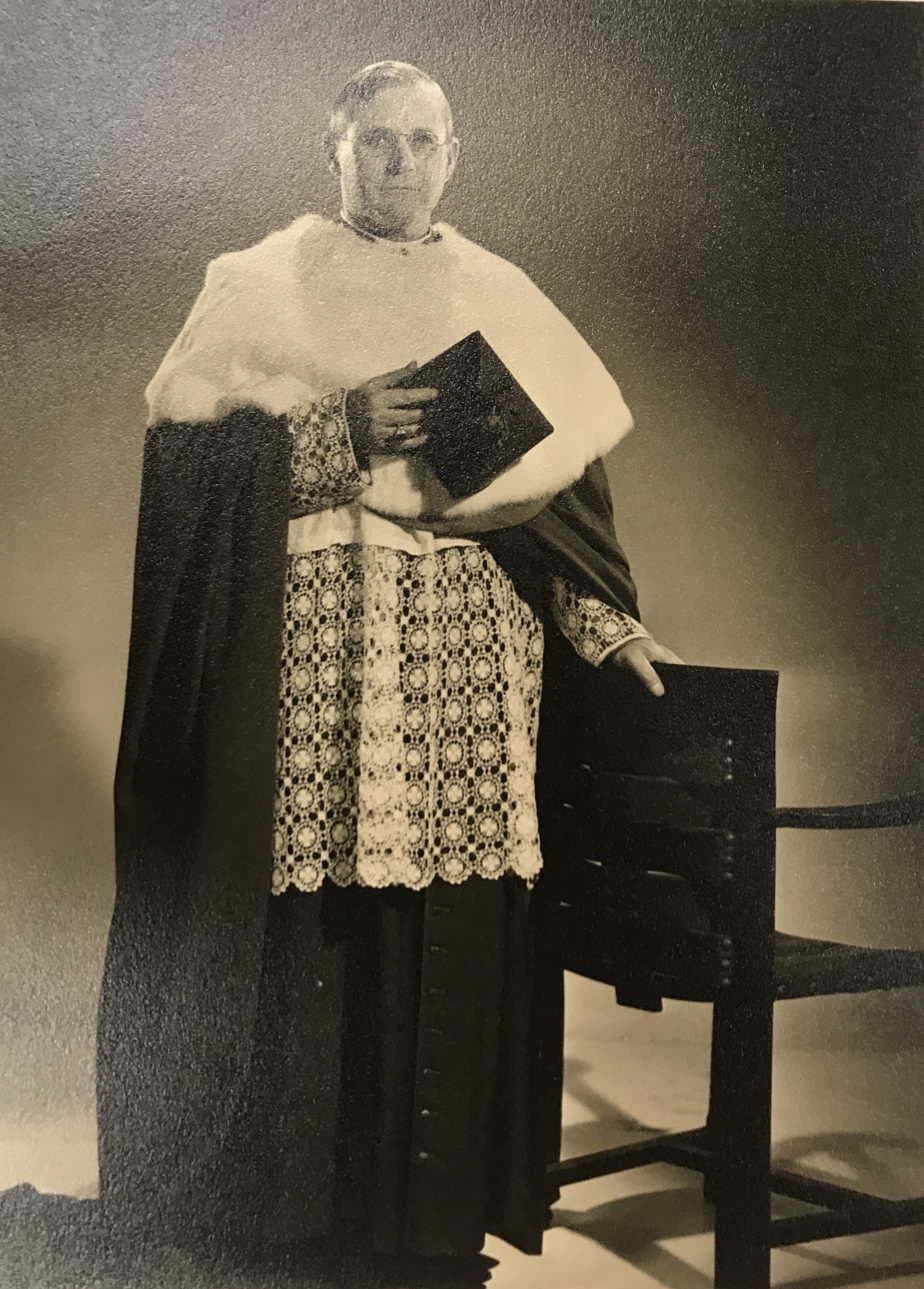
- Archdiocese: Birmingham
- Province: Birmingham
- Appointed: 11 May 1954
- Term ended: 22 March 1965
- Predecessor: Joseph Masterson
- Successor: George Patrick Dwyer

Orders
- Ordination: 27 February 1926
- Consecration: 25 July 1947 by Joseph Masterson

Personal details
- Born: Francis Joseph Grimshaw; 6 October 1901 Bridgwater, Somerset, England
- Died: 22 March 1965 (aged 63)
- Buried: St Mary's College, Oscott
- Denomination: Roman Catholic

Francis Edward Joseph Grimshaw (6 October 1901 – 22 March 1965) was a British Roman Catholic bishop, who served as Archbishop of Birmingham from 1954 until his death.

== Early life ==
Born in Bridgwater, Somerset on 6 October 1901, the eldest of three sons of Joseph Grimshaw, an engineering pattern maker from Hulme, Manchester and his wife Sarah Theresa Handley from Stourbridge, Worcestershire. Francis was educated in Bristol by the Irish Christian Brothers, at St Brendan's College, then studied for the Priesthood at the Venerable English College, Rome.

== Priestly ministry ==
He was ordained in Bristol as a priest for the Diocese of Clifton on 27 February 1926.

Following Ordination Father Grimshaw served first as Curate at Swindon from 1926 to 1932, then as Parish Priest at St Joseph's, Fishponds, Bristol from 1932 to 1945 and finally at St Mary's, Bath, also serving as Diocesan Inspector of Schools.

Fr Grimshaw was appointed Bishop of Plymouth on 2 June 1947. His consecration to the Episcopate took place on 25 July 1947. The principal consecrator was Joseph Masterson, Archbishop of Birmingham; and the principal co-consecrators were William Lee (Bishop of Clifton), and Edward Ellis, Bishop of Nottingham.

He was translated to the Archdiocese of Birmingham as Archbishop of Birmingham on 11 May 1954. In 1958 he led the Christian Brothers schools of England on a pilgrimage to Lourdes in the centenary year of the apparitions of the Blessed Virgin Mary to St Bernadette. He participated in the first three sessions of the Second Vatican Council, held between in 1962 and 1965.

He died in office on 22 March 1965, aged 63 at St Paul's Convent, Selly Park and is buried at St Mary's College, Oscott.

== Legacy ==
Several schools have been named after him, including Archbishop Grimshaw School, Solihull. St Boniface's Catholic College in Plymouth has a House named after him.

Catholic Church titles
Preceded by John Keily	Bishop of Plymouth; 1947–1954	Succeeded by Cyril Restieaux
Preceded by Joseph Masterson	Archbishop of Birmingham; 1954–1965	Succeeded by George Dwyer
