= New Polzeath =

Village in north Cornwall, England

Coordinates: 50.57825°N 4.91752°W

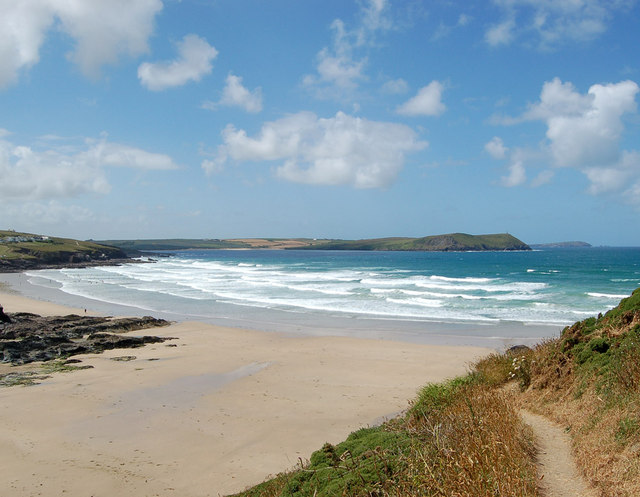
Pentireglaze beach near New Polzeath

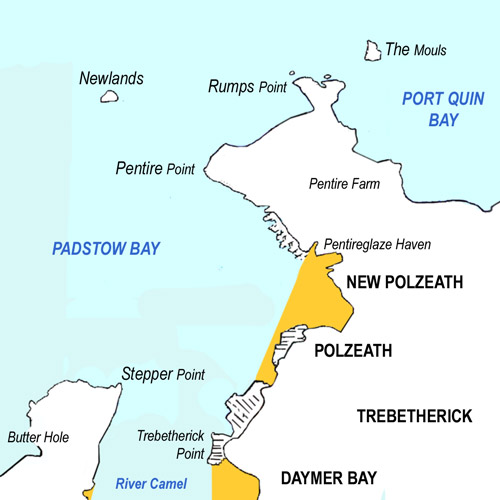
Sketch map showing Polzeath and the surrounding area

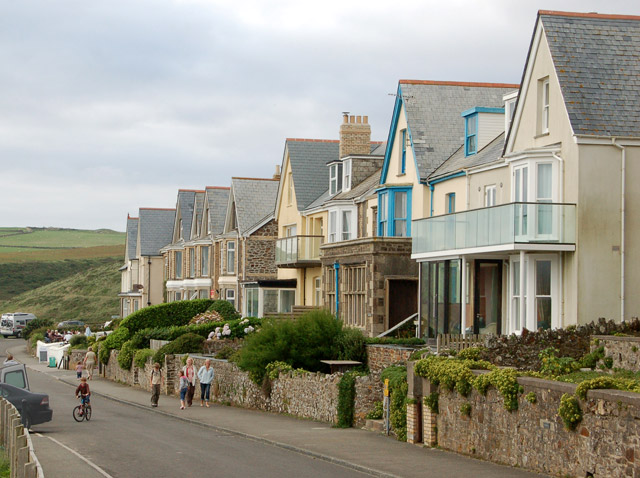
Atlantic Terrace in New Polzeath

New Polzeath (Cornish: Trebenntir) is a coastal settlement immediately north-east of Polzeath in north Cornwall, England, United Kingdom. It is situated approximately 5 miles (8.0 km) north-northwest of Wadebridge at grid reference SW 935 794.

The main street in New Polzeath is Atlantic Terrace which faces across the bay. The terrace was built in 1898. The area of New Polzeath inland of the terrace was developed later. An estate of holiday homes was built in the last few years. The National Trust owns land to the west and north of New Polzeath and this curtails further development.

New Polzeath has access to Polzeath beach at low water; there is also access to Pentireglaze beach, a smaller beach.

The road to New Polzeath connects with the road into Polzeath over a mile east of the villages so although the places are contiguous, driving between them means a 2-mile (3 km) trip. Alternatively a coast path of approximately 400 yd (370 m) links the two places.

Just beyond the Point, facing Rumps Point, is a plaque commemorating the place where Laurence Binyon, in 1914, composed his famous poem For the Fallen incorporating the Ode of Remembrance.

The former Roman Catholic Archbishop of Westminster, Cardinal Bernard Griffin, died suddenly in office of a heart attack while holidaying here in August 1956. His death occurred in the Diocese of Plymouth, under which Cornwall and the Isles of Scilly fall.
