= Osburh of Coventry =

Anglo-Saxon saint

Osburh (or Osburga) was a Saint in Coventry, probably Anglo-Saxon. Nothing about her life has survived to the present day. Her mortal remains were enshrined at Coventry. Close to the Forest of Arden, Coventry was at that time a tiny settlement.

== Date ==
There are two versions of when Osburh lived. From Butler's Lives of the Saints, and the nineteenth century book by Stanton, David Farmer suggests that Osburh died around 1018 CE, having been, from its inception, abbess of a convent founded by King Cnut two years earlier.

Osburh's cult may predate the Viking Age. A Saxon nunnery was founded around 700 CE by Osburh, destroyed by King Cnut in 1016. This stood in the vicinity of St. Mary's Priory. Around the Saxon nunnery, Coventry, in an area where settlement dates back to the Iron Age, gradually developed as a town. A 14th-century note in MS Bodley 438 mentions an early nunnery at Coventry. The 15th-century writer John Rous said that Cnut the Great destroyed the old Coventry minster, and referred to the "holy virgin Osburga now laid there in a noble shrine". The Anglo-Saxon Chronicle records the devastation of neighbouring Warwickshire in 1016, so Cnut's having attacked a convent at Coventry is credible.

The Earl Leofric's 1043 Coventry charter said that the abbey in those days was dedicated to Osburh (as well as St Mary, St Peter and All Saints). The addition of Osburh could have been at some point in the previous 27 years, after 1016. According to Stanton's listing for 30 March, the nuns were expelled in 1045. Later, a new foundation for men was established on the site by Leofric and his wife Godiva.

== Feast-day ==
The 13th-century Scandinavian Ribe Martyrology said 21 January was her feast-day; later it was celebrated on 30 March.

== Bones ==
Her bones were said to be at Coventry in the 12th-century resting-place list of Hugh Candidus. Initially the location was the south transept of the post-Conquest monastery church of Coventry. Within the monastery, her relics were translated in 1482. Destroyed during the sixteenth-century Reformation, when the monastery was dissolved, was a shrine with relics, along with Osburh's head enclosed in copper and gold (description in 1539).

== Legacy ==
St Osburg's Church in Coventry is named after her. In its south aisle is a stained-glass window in her honour. She is also commemorated in the 'West Screen' window engraved by the New Zealand-born artist John Hutton at Coventry Cathedral.
