= George Cross Island Association =

The George Cross Island Association is a charitable organisation that was initiated to honour and remember those that suffered during the Siege of Malta (World War II). The association has branches across the UK and a branch in Malta. The Patron of the G.C.I.A. is The Duke of Edinburgh, KG, KT, Prince Philip who himself served in Malta.

== Founding ==
The George Cross Island Association was founded by retired British Navy man Fredrick James Plenty (1921 to 1996). With the help of his one time Captain and a group of like minded veterans and servicemen, the association was initiated in July 1987. As Founder Member, Fred Plenty was also Life Vice President.

== Siege Bell Memorial ==
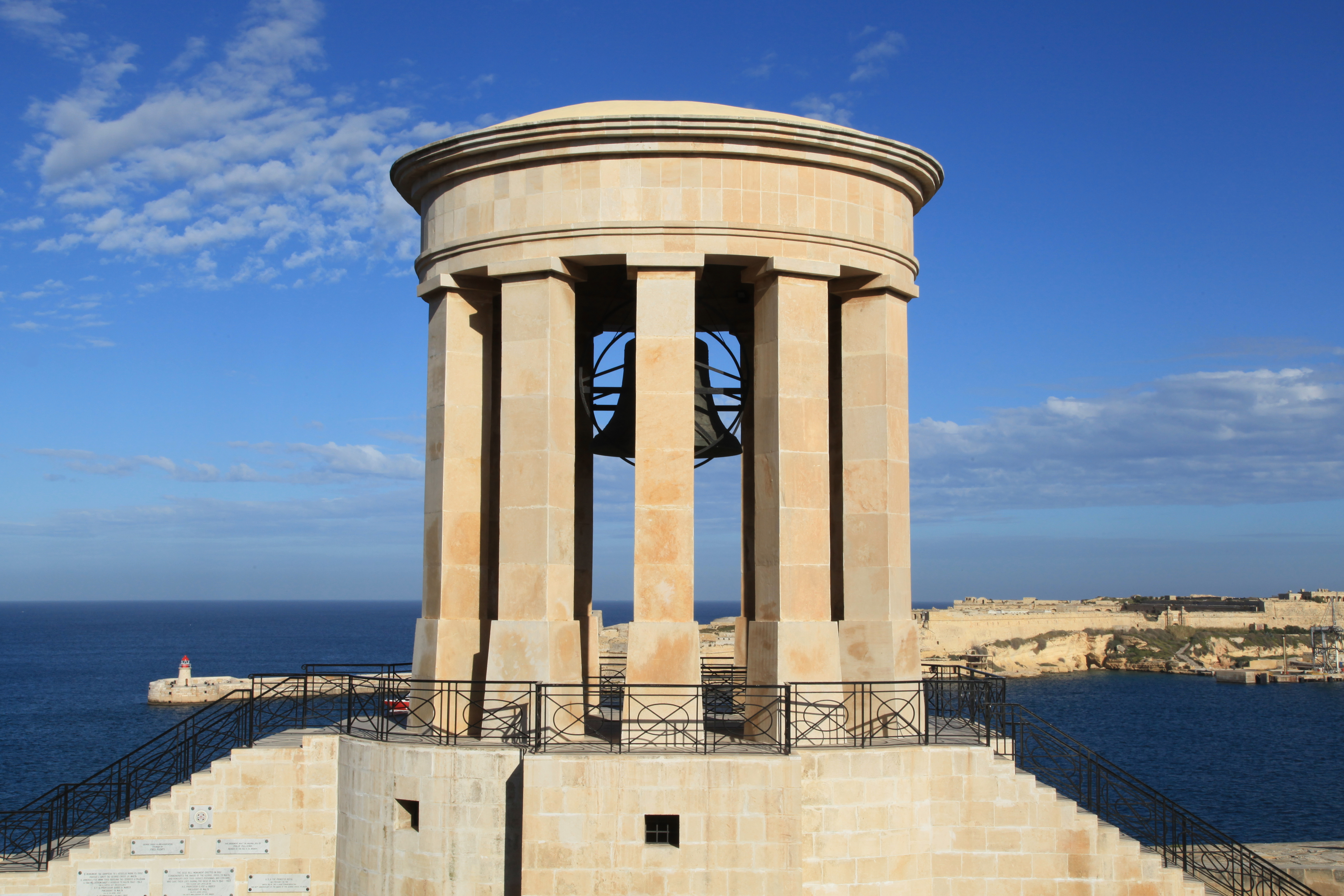
Siege Bell Memorial

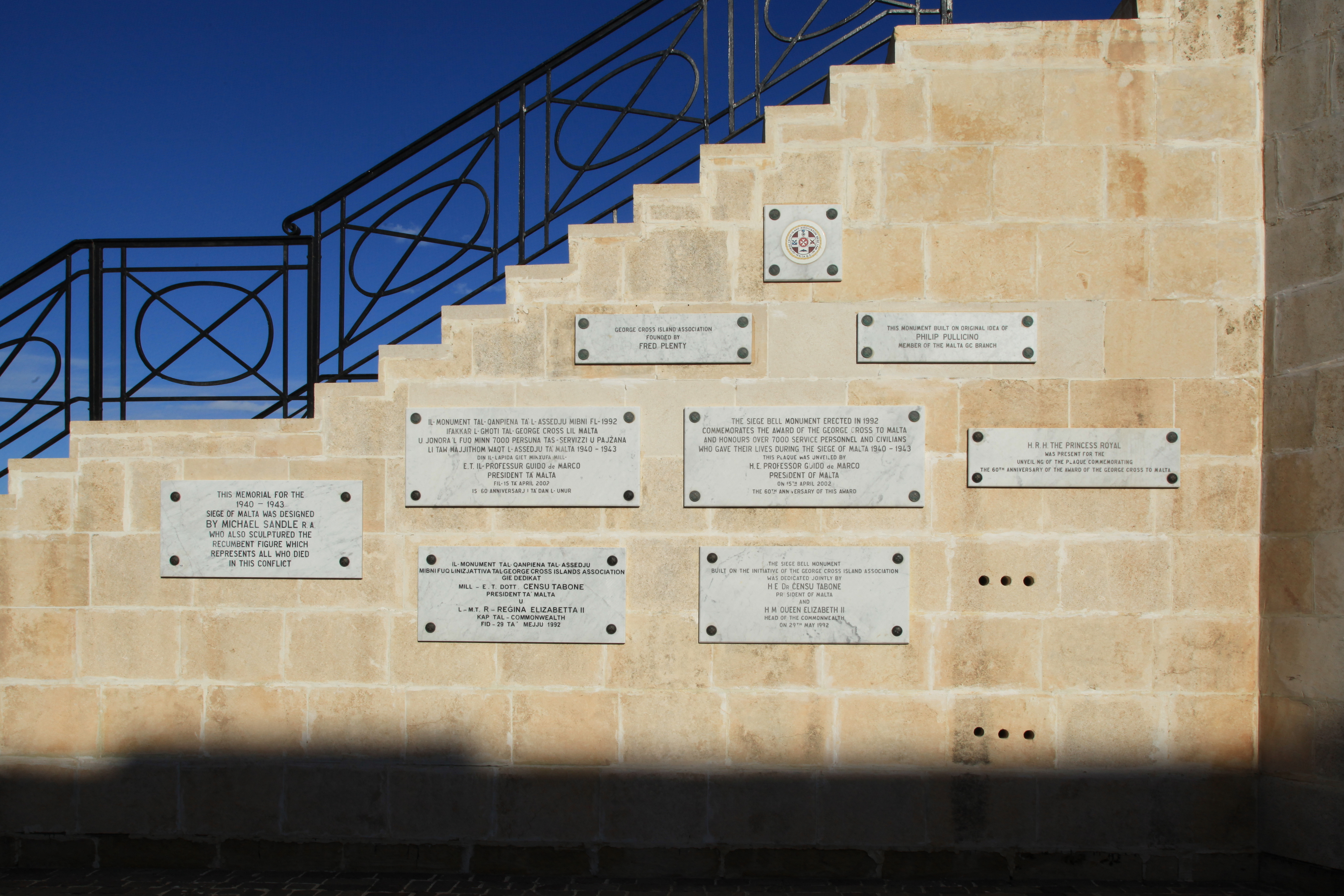
Siege Bell Memorial recognition plaques

The George Cross Island Association initiated and assisted in the funding of the Siege Bell Memorial. Designed by sculptor Michael Sandle, the memorial was inaugurated in May 1992 to commemorate the 50th Anniversary of the awarding of the George Cross to the island of Malta, and is situated overlooking the Grand Harbour, Valletta, Malta.
