= Carmelite Monastery, Wolverhampton =

Monastery in Wolverhampton, West Midlands, England

Coordinates: 52.57011°N 2.14695°W

Carmelite Monastery, Wolverhampton is a monastic house at Poplar Road, Penn Fields, Wolverhampton, in the West Midlands, England. It was founded in 1922 by sisters from the Most Holy Trinity Monastery of Notting Hill, London.
