= Holy Trinity Catholic Academy of Stafford and Stone =

- Stafford, Stone, Staffordshire, England

Information
- Type: Catholic Primary School
- Religious affiliation: Roman Catholic
- Local authority: Staffordshire
- Ofsted: Reports
- Gender: Coeducational
- Age: 3 to 18

The Holy Trinity Catholic Academy of Stafford and Stone is a group of catholic schools based within Staffordshire. The Holy Trinity Catholic Academy of Stafford and Stone is currently running. This is used for event planning, and among other things, sports competitions.

== Primary ==
- St Anne's RC Primary School
- St Austin's RC Primary School
- St John's CE Primary School
- St Leonard's Primary School
- St Patrick's Catholic Primary School
- St Dominic's Catholic Primary School
- Blessed Mother Theresa's Catholic Primary School
- St Mary's Catholic Primary

== Secondary ==
- Blessed William Howard Catholic School
