= Edward Ilsley =

Roman Catholic Archbishop of Birmingham

- Archbishop of Birmingham
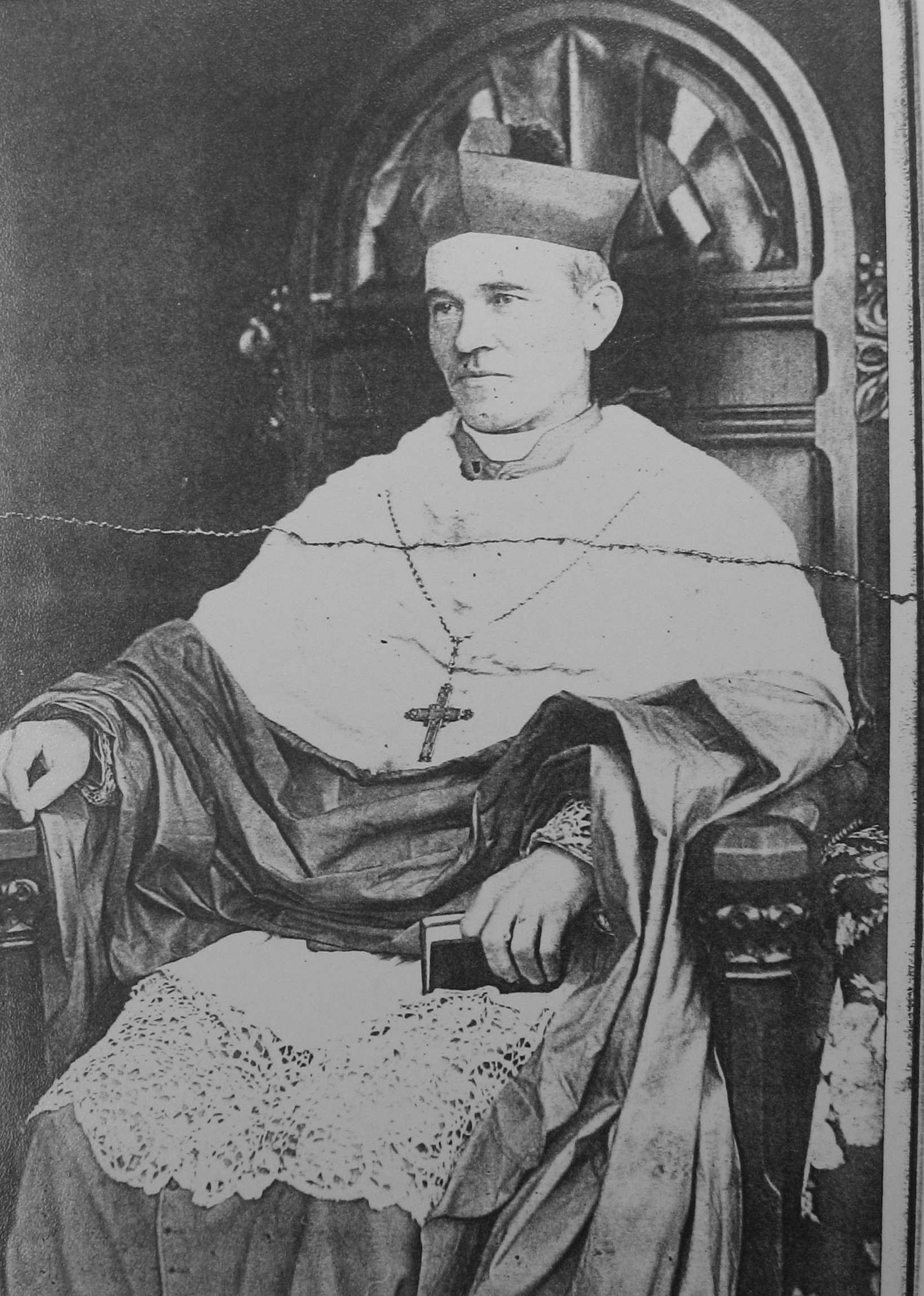
- Church: Catholic Church
- Archdiocese: Archdiocese of Birmingham
- In office: 28 October 1911 – 15 January 1921
- Predecessor: Himself (as Bishop)
- Successor: John McIntyre
- Other post: Titular Archbishop of Macra (1921-1926)
- Previous posts: Bishop of Birmingham (1888-1911); Titular Bishop of Fesseë (1879-1888); Auxiliary Bishop of Birmingham (1879-1888)

Orders
- Ordination: 29 June 1861
- Consecration: 4 December 1879 by William Bernard Ullathorne

Personal details
- Born: 11 May 1838 Stafford, England, United Kingdom
- Died: 1 December 1926 (aged 88) Birmingham, England, United Kingdom

Edward Ilsley (11 May 1838 — 1 December 1926) was an English Catholic prelate who served as Bishop of Birmingham from 1888 to 1911, and then the first Archbishop of Birmingham from 1911 to 1921 when his resignation was accepted by the Pope.

== Career ==
In the October 1873, St. Bernard's diocesan Seminary was opened at Olton, Warwickshire, of which the first rector was the Rev. Edward Ilsley, successively canon and auxiliary bishop (December 4, 1879).

On 17 February 1888, Dr. Ilsley became the second Bishop of Birmingham, and at once took in hand the difficult task of protecting and rescuing the destitute Catholic children of the diocese. St. Edward's Home for homeless boys was opened at Coleshill (Warwickshire), 6 November 1906, with branch houses for boys and girls, similarly situated, in various centres, besides a Home for Working Boys and a Night Refuge, both in Birmingham.

In July, 1889, Oscott College was closed to lay students and reopened as a Central Seminary for ecclesiastics only. In accord with the movement promoted by the early provincial synods of Westminster, Bishop Ullathorne established in 1872 the Birmingham diocesan seminary at Olton, a few miles south of Birmingham. He placed the Rev. Edward Ilsley (now bishop of the diocese) over it as rector, while he himself personally directed its spirit. The institution flourished, though the number of students averaged but twenty. Meanwhile, Oscott maintained its own school of philosophers and theologians. Oscott, like Olton, suffered from financial strain. With a bold stroke Bishop Ilsley closed Oscott as a mixed college, sold the seminary buildings and estate, and gathered all his seminarists and teaching staff into the one greater seminary of St. Mary's, Oscott. The new institution began with thirty-six students in September, 1889, under the rectorship of the bishop.

The history of Roman Catholicism in Birmingham since Ullathorne's death is mainly one of expansion. One notable and controversial change of policy was made by Edward Ilsley almost immediately after he succeeded Ullathorne. Ilsley closed both the public school at Oscott and the diocesan seminary which his predecessor had established at Olton in 1867, and restricted Oscott to theological students from the diocese. He was deeply interested in Oscott and remained rector for several years after he became bishop. In 1911 Birmingham became an archbishopric, with subordinate sees at Clifton, Newport, Plymouth, and Shrewsbury. Ilsley was the first archbishop.

== Legacy ==
Archbishop Ilsley Catholic School in Acocks Green, Birmingham, which uses his coat of arms (five golden birds around a golden floriated cross on a blue shield, derived from that of St Edward the Confessor) as their school badge. Ilsley's motto was Justus et Tenax Propositi or Just and Firm of Purpose. Mary McInally authored a book which traces his life from childhood through both positions in the clergy, to his death in 1926.

Catholic Church titles
Preceded by Bernard Ullathorne	Bishop of Birmingham; 1888–1911	Title elevated
New title	Archbishop of Birmingham; 1911–1921	Succeeded by John McIntyre
