= Thomas Leighton Williams =

English clergyman

The Most Reverend Thomas Leighton Williams
- Archbishop of Birmingham
- Province: Birmingham
- See: Birmingham
- Installed: 25 July 1929
- Term ended: 1 April 1946
- Predecessor: John McIntyre
- Successor: Joseph Masterson

Orders
- Ordination: 24 August 1900
- Consecration: 25 July 1929 by Francis Bourne, Dudley Cary-Elwes, and John Barrett

Personal details
- Born: 20 March 1877 Birmingham, England
- Died: 1 April 1946 (aged 69) Birmingham, England
- Buried: St Chad's Cathedral, Birmingham
- Denomination: Roman Catholic Church

Styles of Thomas Leighton Williams
- Reference style: The Most Reverend
- Spoken style: Your Grace or Archbishop

Thomas Cuthbert Leighton Williams (20 March 1877 – 1 April 1946) was an English clergyman who served in the Roman Catholic Church as the Archbishop of Birmingham from 1929 to 1946.

He was born in Handsworth, Birmingham on 20 March 1877 to James Anthony and Emma Mary (née Leighton) Williams. He was educated at St Wilfrid's College, Cotton and St Mary's College, Oscott. He was ordained to the priesthood on 24 August 1900. He obtained a Bachelor of Arts degree in 1903 and a Master of Arts degree in 1909.

== Pastoral career ==
Between 1905 and 1909, he was Assistant Master at St Wilfrid's College, Cotton and Assistant Master at St Edmund's College, Ware.

He was appointed the Master of St Edmund's House, Cambridge from 1909 to 1918. During the First World War, he also served in the Royal Army Chaplains' Department (RACD) and was mentioned in despatches. After the war, he was the Principal of St Charles's House, Oxford (1920–22) and Rector of St Wilfrid's College, Cotton (1922–1929).

He was appointed the archbishop of the Metropolitan See of Birmingham by Pope Pius XI on 23 June 1929. His consecration to the Episcopate took place on 25 July 1929, the principal consecrator was Cardinal Francis Alphonsus Bourne, Archbishop of Westminster, and the principal co-consecrators were Bishop Dudley Charles Cary-Elwes of Northampton, and Bishop John Patrick Barrett of Plymouth. In 1937, Williams also became President of the Catholic Social Guild.

== Death ==
He died in the Old Queen Elizabeth Hospital Birmingham on 1 April 1946, aged 69, and was buried in the crypt of St Chad's Cathedral, Birmingham on 5 April 1946.

Catholic Church titles
| Preceded by John McIntyre | Archbishop of Birmingham; 1929–1946 | Succeeded by Joseph Masterson |
