= Archbishop of Birmingham =

Roman Catholic prelate in England

- Archbishopric

catholic
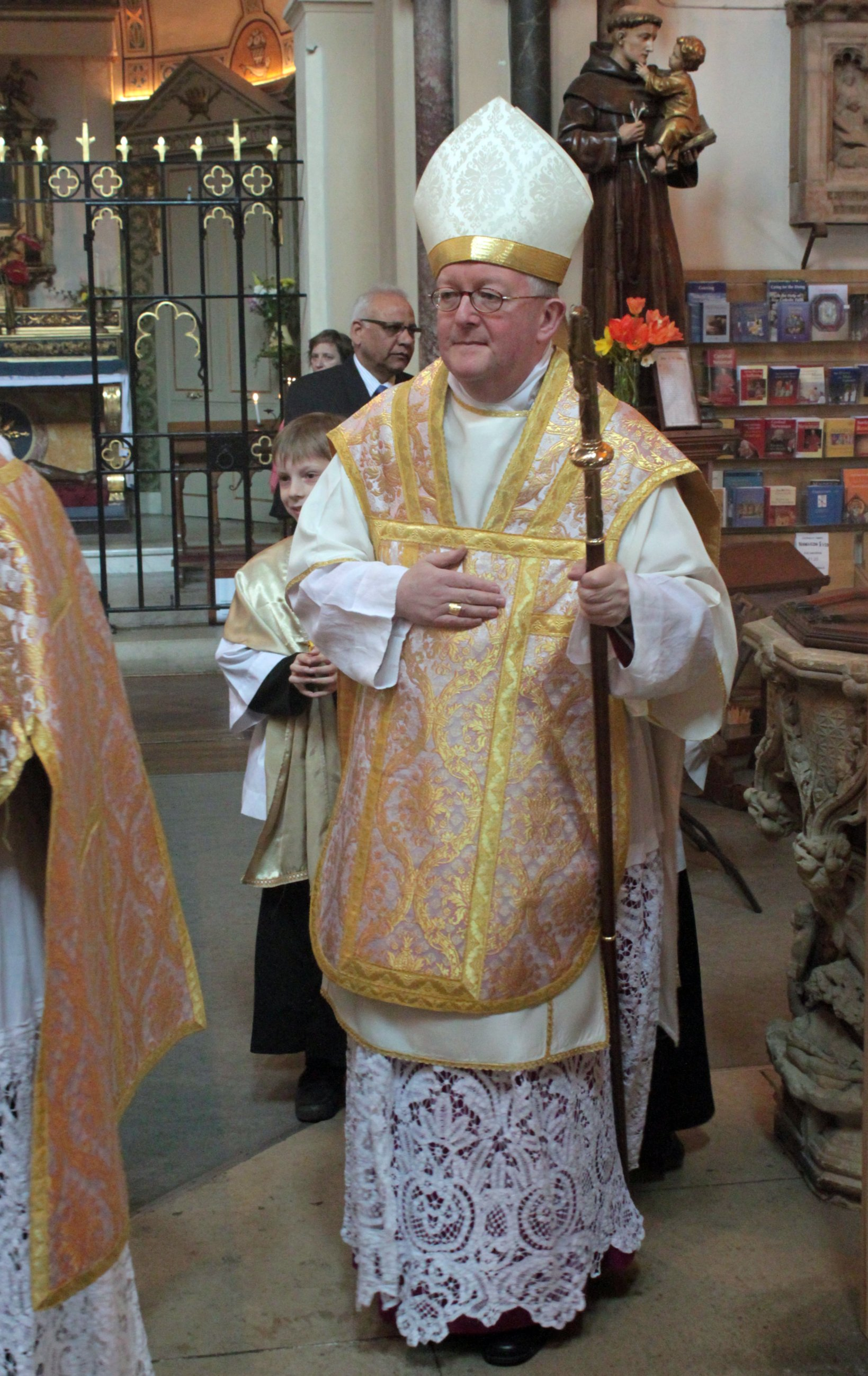

- Coat of arms
- Incumbent: Bernard Longley

Location
- Ecclesiastical province: Province of Birmingham

Information
- Established: Bishopric in 1850; Archbishopric in 1911
- Diocese: Archdiocese of Birmingham
- Cathedral: St. Chad's Cathedral, Birmingham

The Archbishop of Birmingham heads the Roman Catholic Archdiocese of Birmingham in England. As such he is the metropolitan archbishop of the Province of Birmingham. The archdiocese covers an area of 8,735 km^{2} (3,400 sq mi) and spans of the counties of Oxfordshire, Staffordshire, West Midlands, Warwickshire and Worcestershire. The see in the City of Birmingham where the archbishop's seat is located at the Metropolitan Cathedral and Basilica of Saint Chad.

With the gradual abolition of the legal restrictions on the activities of Catholics in England and Wales in the early 19th century, Rome decided to proceed to bridge the gap of the centuries from Queen Elizabeth I by instituting Catholic dioceses on the regular historical pattern. Thus Pope Pius IX issued the Bull Universalis Ecclesiae of 29 September 1850 by which thirteen new dioceses which did not formally claim any continuity with the pre-Elizabethan English dioceses were created. One of these was the diocese of Birmingham. This has its origins in the Vicariates Apostolic of England, of the Midland District and lastly of the Central District. The last Vicar Apostolic of the Central District, from 28 July 1848, was Bishop William Bernard Ullathorne, O.S.B., who on 29 September 1850 became the first bishop of Birmingham.

In the early period from 1850 the diocese was a suffragan of the Metropolitan See of Westminster, but a further development was the creation under Pope Pius X, on 28 October 1911, of a new Province of Birmingham.

The current archbishop is The Most Reverend Bernard Longley, who was appointed the ninth archbishop of Birmingham on 1 October 2009 and installed at the Metropolitan Cathedral and Basilica of Saint Chad on 8 December 2009, the Solemnity of the Immaculate Conception and one of the patronal feasts of the archdiocese, St Chad being the other.

== List of bishops and archbishops ==
=== Bishop of Birmingham ===
Bishops of Birmingham
From	Until	Incumbent	Notes
1850	1888	William Bernard Ullathorne, O.S.B.	Previously Vicar Apostolic of the Central District (1848–1850). Appointed Bishop of Birmingham on 29 September 1850. Resigned on 27 April 1888 and appointed Titular Archbishop of Cabasa. Died on 21 March 1889.
1888	1911	Edward Ilsley	Formerly an auxiliary bishop of Birmingham (1879–1888). Appointed Bishop of Birmingham on 17 February 1888. Elevated from bishop to archbishop of Birmingham on 27 November 1911.
In 1911, the diocese was elevated to a metropolitan archdiocese.

=== Archbishop of Birmingham ===
Archbishop of Birmingham
From	Until	Incumbent	Notes
1911	1921	Edward Ilsley	Elevated from bishop to archbishop of Birmingham on 27 November 1911. Retired on 13 June 1921 and appointed Titular Archbishop of Macra. Died on 1 December 1926.
1921	1928	John McIntyre	Previously an Official of the Roman Curia and Titular Archbishop of Oxyrynchus (1917–1921). Appointed Archbishop of Birmingham on 16 June 1921 and installed on 5 July 1921. Resigned on 17 November 1928 and appointed Titular Archbishop of Odessus. Died on 21 November 1935.
1929	1946	Thomas Leighton Williams	Appointed archbishop on 25 July 1929 and consecrated on 25 July 1929. Died in office on 1 April 1946.
1947	1953	Joseph Masterson	Appointed archbishop on 8 February 1947 and consecrated on 19 March 1947. Died in office on 30 November 1953.
1954	1965	Francis Joseph Grimshaw	Previously Bishop of Plymouth (1947–1954). Appointed Archbishop of Birmingham on 11 May 1954. Died in office on 22 March 1965.
1965	1981	George Dwyer	Previously Bishop of Leeds (1957–1965). Appointed Archbishop of Birmingham on 5 October 1965. Retired on 1 September 1981 and died on 17 September 1987.
1982	1999	Maurice Noël Léon Couve de Murville	Appointed archbishop on 22 January 1982 and consecrated on 25 March 1982. Resigned on 12 June 1999 and died on 3 November 2007.
2000	2009	Vincent Gerard Nichols	Previously an auxiliary bishop of Westminster (1991–2000). Appointed Archbishop of Birmingham on 15 February 2000. Translated to the archbishopric of Westminster on 21 May 2009.
2009	present	Bernard Longley	Previously an Auxiliary Bishop of Westminster (2003–2009). Appointed Archbishop of Birmingham on 1 October 2009 and installed on 8 December 2009.

== See also ==
- List of Roman Catholic dioceses in England and Wales
