= Archdiocese of Birmingham =

Catholic archdiocese in England

Coordinates: 52.4856°N 1.8987°W

Archdiocese of Birmingham Archidioecesis Birminghamiensis

Catholic
- Coat of arms

Location
- Country: England
- Territory: Warwickshire; Oxfordshire; Staffordshire; Worcestershire
- Ecclesiastical province: Birmingham
- Deaneries: 11
- Subdivisions: 3 Pastoral Areas

Statistics
- Area: 8,735 km^{2} (3,373 sq mi)
- Population: Total; Catholics: (as of 2015); 4,993,000; 443,300 (8.9%)
- Parishes: 224
- Schools: 250

Information
- Denomination: Catholic
- Sui iuris church: Latin Church
- Rite: Roman Rite
- Established: 29 September 1850 (As Diocese of Birmingham); 28 October 1911 (As Archdiocese of Birmingham)
- Cathedral: Metropolitan Cathedral Church of Saint Chad, Birmingham
- Patron Saints: Our Blessed Lady Conceived Without Sin (8 December), Saint Chad (1 March)
- Secular priests: 214 (+100 deacons)

Current leadership
- Pope: Leo XIV
- Archbishop: Bernard Longley
- Auxiliary Bishops: David Evans; Timothy Menezes; Richard Walker
- Vicar General: Jonathan Veasey
- Episcopal Vicars: Gary Buckby; Una Coogan
- Judicial Vicar: Joseph McLoughlin
- Bishops emeritus: Philip Pargeter; Leonard William Kenney

Map
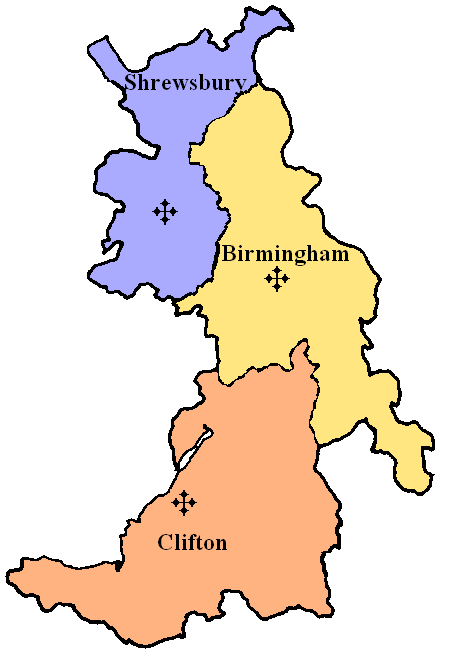
- The Archdiocese of Birmingham within the Province of Birmingham

Website
- birminghamdiocese.org.uk

The Archdiocese of Birmingham is one of the principal Latin Church diocese of the Catholic Church in England and Wales. The archdiocese covers an area of 3,373 square miles (8,740 km^{2}), encompassing the historic counties of Warwickshire, Staffordshire, Worcestershire and Oxfordshire. The metropolitan see is in the City of Birmingham at the Metropolitan Cathedral Church of Saint Chad. The metropolitan province includes the suffragan dioceses of Clifton and Shrewsbury.

The archbishop is Bernard Longley, who was named the ninth Archbishop of Birmingham on 1 October 2009. He succeeds the Archbishop of Westminster, Cardinal Vincent Nichols (2000–09). Longley was installed as Archbishop of Birmingham at the Metropolitan Cathedral and Basilica of Saint Chad on 8 December 2009, the Solemnity of the Immaculate Conception and one of the patronal feasts of the archdiocese, St Chad being the other.

== History ==
Erected as the Vicariate Apostolic of the Midlands District in 1688, the vicariate grew very slowly until the advent of the industrial revolution. In response to large growth the name was changed in 1840 to the Vicariate Apostolic of Central District and a new vicariate created out of the eastern district.

Finally, in September 1850, the vicariate was elevated to a full diocese, as the Diocese of Birmingham, along with the Diocese of Nottingham and the Diocese of Shrewsbury. The diocese was then suffragan to the Archdiocese of Westminster.

The Diocese of Birmingham was elevated to archdiocesan status on 28 October 1911.

== Diocesan boundaries ==
The Archbishop of Birmingham, Bernard Longley, has overall episcopal oversight of the diocese that is divided into three pastoral areas, each of which is headed by an auxiliary bishop and contains a number of deaneries:

- Central and Western Pastoral Area (Area Bishop: David Evans): Birmingham Cathedral & South; Birmingham East & North; Kidderminster & Worcester.
- Northern Pastoral Area (Area Bishop: Timothy Menezes): Dudley & Wolverhampton; Lichfield & Walsall; North Staffordshire; Stafford.
- Southern Pastoral Area (Area Bishop: Richard Walker): Banbury & Warwick; Coventry & Nuneaton; Oxford (North); Oxford (South).

== Bishops ==
=== Ordinaries ===
==== Vicars Apostolic of the Midland District ====
- Bonaventure Giffard (1687–1703), appointed Vicar Apostolic of the London District
- George Witham (1702–1716), appointed Vicar Apostolic of the Northern District
- John Talbot Stonor (1716–1756)
- John Joseph Hornyold (1756–1778)
- Thomas Joseph Talbot (1778–1795)
- Charles Berington (1795–1798)
- Gregory Stapleton (1800–1802)
- John Milner (1803–1826)
- Thomas Walsh (1826–1840), became Vicar Apostolic of the Central District (see below)

==== Vicars Apostolic of the Central District ====
- Thomas Walsh (1840–1848), see above; appointed Vicar Apostolic of the London District
- William Bernard Ullathorne (1848–1850); see below

==== Bishops of Birmingham ====
- William Bernard Ullathorne (1850–1888); see above
- Edward Ilsley (1888–1911); see below

==== Archbishops of Birmingham ====
- Edward Ilsley (1911–1921); see above
- John McIntyre (1921–1928)
- Thomas Leighton Williams (1929–1946)
- Joseph Masterson (1947–1953)
- Francis Joseph Grimshaw (1954–1965)
- George Patrick Dwyer (1965–1981)
- Maurice Noël Léon Couve de Murville (1982–1999)
- Vincent Gerard Nichols (2000–2009), appointed Archbishop of Westminster (Cardinal in 2014)
- Bernard Longley (2009–present)

=== Coadjutor Vicars Apostolic ===
- John Joseph Hornyold (1751–1756)
- Thomas Joseph Talbot (1766–1778)
- Charles Berington (1786–1795)
- Thomas Walsh (1825–1826)
- Nicholas Wiseman (1840–1847), appointed Coadjutor Vicar Apostolic of the London District, later Vicar Apostolic of the London District and Archbishop of Westminster (elevated to Cardinal in 1850)

=== Auxiliary bishops ===
- John Patrick Barrett (1926–1929), appointed Bishop of Plymouth
- Terence John Brain (1991–1997), appointed Bishop of Salford
- Humphrey Penderell Bright (1944–1964)
- Robert John Byrne CO (2014–2019), appointed Bishop of Hexham and Newcastle
- Joseph Francis Cleary (1964–1987)
- Anthony Joseph Emery (1967–1976), appointed Bishop of Portsmouth
- David Ernest Charles Evans (2020–)
- Michael Francis Glancey (1924–1925)
- Bernard William Griffin (1938–1943), appointed Archbishop of Westminster (Cardinal in 1946)
- Roger Francis Crispian Hollis (1987–1988), appointed Bishop of Portsmouth
- Edward Ilsley (1879–1888), appointed Bishop here
- Leonard William Kenney CP (2006–2021)
- Patrick Leo McCartie (1977–1990), appointed Bishop of Northampton
- David Christopher McGough (2005–2020)
- John McIntyre (1912–1917), appointed official of the Roman Curia and titular archbishop; later returned as Archbishop
- Timothy Menezes (2024-)
- Philip Pargeter (1989–2009)
- Stephen James Lawrence Wright (2020–2023) appointed Bishop of Hexham and Newcastle
- Richard Walker (2024-)

=== Other priests of this diocese who became bishops ===
- Francis Kerril Amherst, appointed Bishop of Northampton in 1858
- James Brown, appointed Bishop of Shrewsbury in 1851
- David John Cashman, appointed auxiliary bishop of Westminster in 1958
- Kieran Thomas Conry, appointed Bishop of Arundel and Brighton in 2001
- James Dey, appointed Vicar Apostolic of Great Britain, Military in 1935
- Edward Dicconson, appointed Vicar Apostolic of Northern District in 1740
- Kevin John Dunn, appointed Bishop of Hexham and Newcastle in 2004
- Joseph Gray, appointed auxiliary bishop of Liverpool in 1968
- Frederick William Keating, appointed Bishop of Northampton in 1908
- Edmund James Knight, appointed auxiliary bishop of Shrewsbury in 1879
- Kevin John Patrick McDonald, appointed Bishop of Northampton in 2001
- Patrick McKinney, appointed Bishop of Nottingham in 2015
- Francis George Mostyn, appointed Vicar Apostolic of Northern District in 1840
- David James Oakley, appointed Bishop of Northampton in 2020
- Richard Butler Roskell, appointed Bishop of Nottingham in 1853
- Marcus Stock, appointed Bishop of Leeds in 2014
- Francis Gerard Thomas, appointed Bishop of Northampton in 1982
- William Wareing, appointed Vicar Apostolic of Eastern District in 1840
- Henry Weedall, appointed Vicar Apostolic of Northern District in 1840; did not take effect

== Education ==
- Holy Trinity Catholic Academy of Stafford and Stone

== See also ==
- List of Roman Catholic dioceses in England and Wales
- List of Catholic churches in the United Kingdom
- Newman University
- St Mary's College, Oscott
- Maryvale Institute
- Harvington Hall
- St Mary's Abbey, Colwich
- St Mary's Convent, Handsworth
- Carmelite Monastery, Wolverhampton
