= St Chad's Cathedral, Birmingham =

- Metropolitan Cathedral and Basilica of St Chad
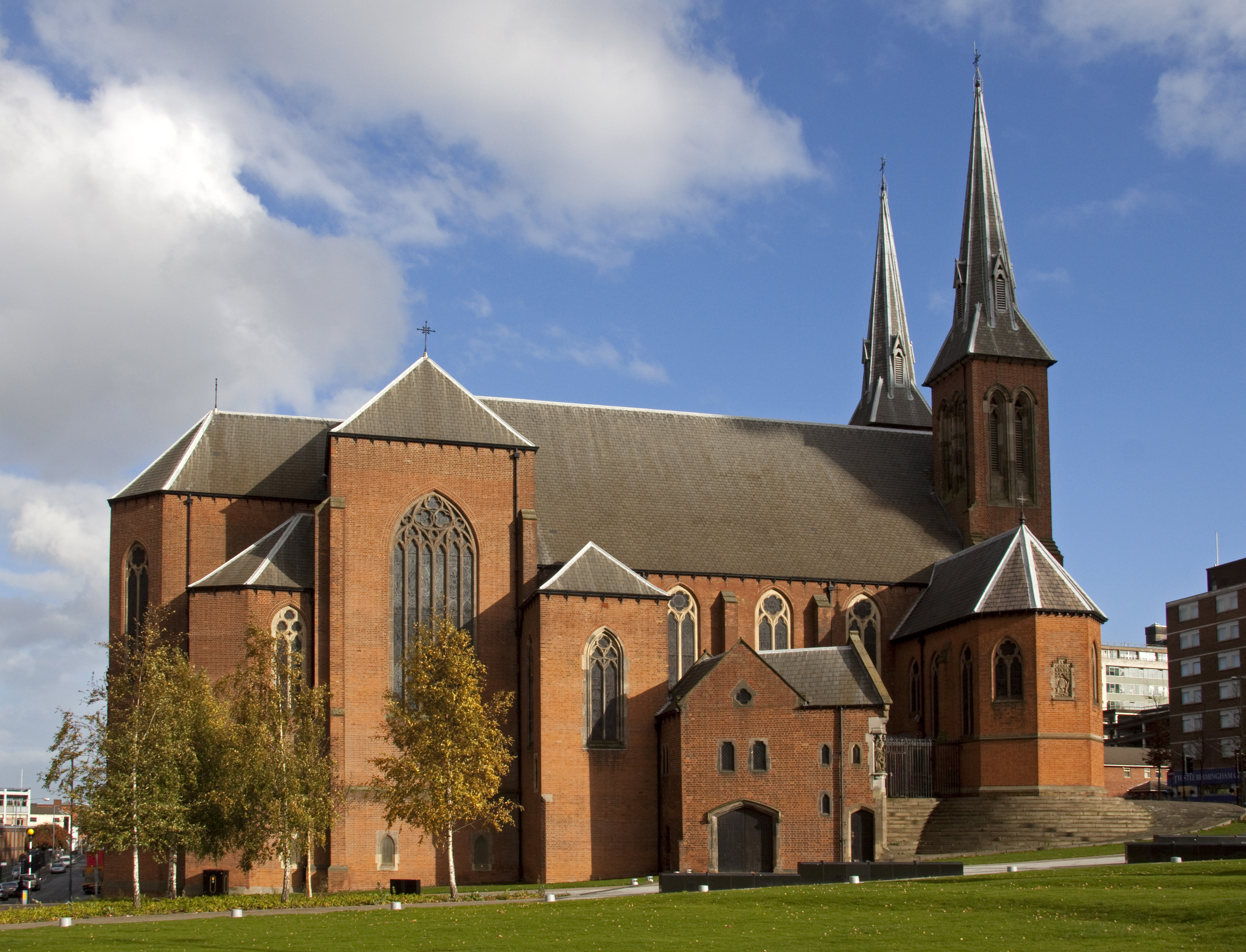

- Shown within West Midlands
- 52°29′08″N 1°53′55″W
- OS grid reference: SP 06973 87524
- Location: Birmingham, West Midlands
- Country: England
- Denomination: Catholic
- Website: stchadscathedral.org.uk

History
- Consecrated: 1841

Architecture
- Heritage designation: Grade II* listed
- Designated: 25 April 1952
- Architect: Augustus Welby Northmore Pugin
- Style: Gothic Revival
- Years built: 1839–1841

Administration
- Province: Birmingham
- Diocese: Birmingham

Clergy
- Archbishop: Bernard Longley
- Bishop(s): David Evans, Timothy Menezes, Richard Walker
- Dean: Brian McGinley

The Metropolitan Cathedral Church and Basilica of Saint Chad is a Catholic cathedral in Birmingham, England. It is the mother church of the Archdiocese of Birmingham and is dedicated to Saint Chad of Mercia.

Designed by Augustus Welby Pugin and substantially complete by 1841, St Chad's is one of the first four Catholic churches constructed after the English Reformation and was raised to cathedral status in 1852. It is one of only four minor basilicas in England (the others being Downside Abbey, the National Shrine of Our Lady of Walsingham and Corpus Christi Priory).

St Chad's is a Grade II* listed building and is located in a public greenspace near St Chad's Queensway, in central Birmingham. It is the seat of the Archbishop of Birmingham, currently Bernard Longley, and the dean is Canon Brian McGinley.

== History ==
St Chad's was one of the first Catholic cathedrals erected in England after the English Reformation initiated in 1534 by King Henry VIII. St Chad's Cathedral was built at the behest of Bishop Thomas Walsh, the local apostolic vicar (styled Vicar Apostolic of the Midland District). St Chad's Cathedral was designed by Augustus Welby Pugin (1812–52), the foundation stone was laid in October 1839 and the building consecrated as a church on 21 June 1841. The project received generous donations from John Talbot, 16th Earl of Shrewsbury, who was the penultimate Catholic Earl of Shrewsbury. The church was raised to the status of cathedral in 1852 following the restoration of the Catholic Hierarchy in England by Pope Pius IX in 1850. The first bishop of Birmingham was William Bernard Ullathorne OSB, whose monument is the crypt of the cathedral. He was buried at St Dominic's Priory, Stone, a convent of Dominican sisters. In 1911 the diocese was elevated to an archdiocese.

The cathedral was situated in the Gunmakers Quarter of Birmingham, which endangered it during the Second World War. It was bombed on 22 November 1940. An incendiary bomb fell through the roof of the south aisle and bounced from the floor into some central heating pipes, which then burst. The water from the damaged central heating pipes thus extinguished the fire. A thanksgiving tablet appears in the diapered design of the transept ceiling, reading Deo Gratias 22 Nov 1940 ('Thanks be to God').

In 1941 St Chad's was declared a minor basilica by Pope Pius XII as a church of important historical connections: only one of two such in England. On formal occasions, the tintinnabulum, a golden lattice bell tower and conopaeum, which is a small red and gold striped umbrella, are displayed at the altar steps as the official symbols of a basilica. The last archbishop was Vincent Nichols, who served from 2000 to 2009, and then became Archbishop of Westminster. As of 2014 the Archdiocese of Birmingham was led by Bernard Longley, titular bishop of Zanda, who was named as the archbishop on 1 October 2009, and was installed in his cathedral by Bishop David McGough (Auxiliary Bishop of Birmingham incharge of the North Staffordshire region of the Archdiocese), and presented with his crozier by his predecessor Archbishop Nichols on the Feast of the Immaculate Conception, 8 December 2009.

St Chad's was the venue for Midnight Mass, broadcast by BBC One at Christmas 2016 and 2021.

== Patronal saint ==
The patron of the cathedral is St Chad, a 7th-century bishop of Mercia and pupil of St Aidan of Lindisfarne. The cathedral enshrines, in the canopy above the altar, the relics of some long bones of St Chad. These were originally enshrined at, and rescued from, Lichfield Cathedral by Prebendary Arthur Dudley, before its despoliation during the Reformation, in about 1538. Fr Dudley passed the bones to his nieces, Bridget and Katherine Dudley of Russells Hall, whence they were divided in parcels and passed down among their family. In 1651, Henry Hodgetts, a farmer, of Sedgley was dying and his wife summoned an itinerant priest, Fr Peter Turner, SJ to give him the last sacraments. When they recited the litany of the saints, Henry kept calling upon Saint Chad, pray for me. On being asked why he called upon St Chad, he replied, "because his bones are in the head of my bed". He then instructed his wife to pass the box of relics to Fr Turner for safekeeping and he took them back to the Seminary at St Omer, in Northern France, where he was based.

In the 19th century, the relics found their way into the hands of Sir Thomas Fitzherbert-Brockholes of Aston Hall, near Stafford. After Sir Thomas's death, his widow moved to Swynnerton Hall and their chaplain, Fr Benjamin Hulme found the dusty velvet-covered box of relics under the altar, when he cleared out the chapel at Aston. Fr Hulme presented the relics to Bishop Walsh. So it was that the relics of the saint who was the apostle of the Midlands in the 7th century were enshrined above the altar. These relics were subjected to radiocarbon dating analysis by the archaeological laboratory of Oxford University in 1985, on the order of Archbishop Couve de Murville, which showed all but one of the bones to date from the 7th century, which concurs with the death of St Chad on 2 March 672 AD.

== Architecture and fittings ==
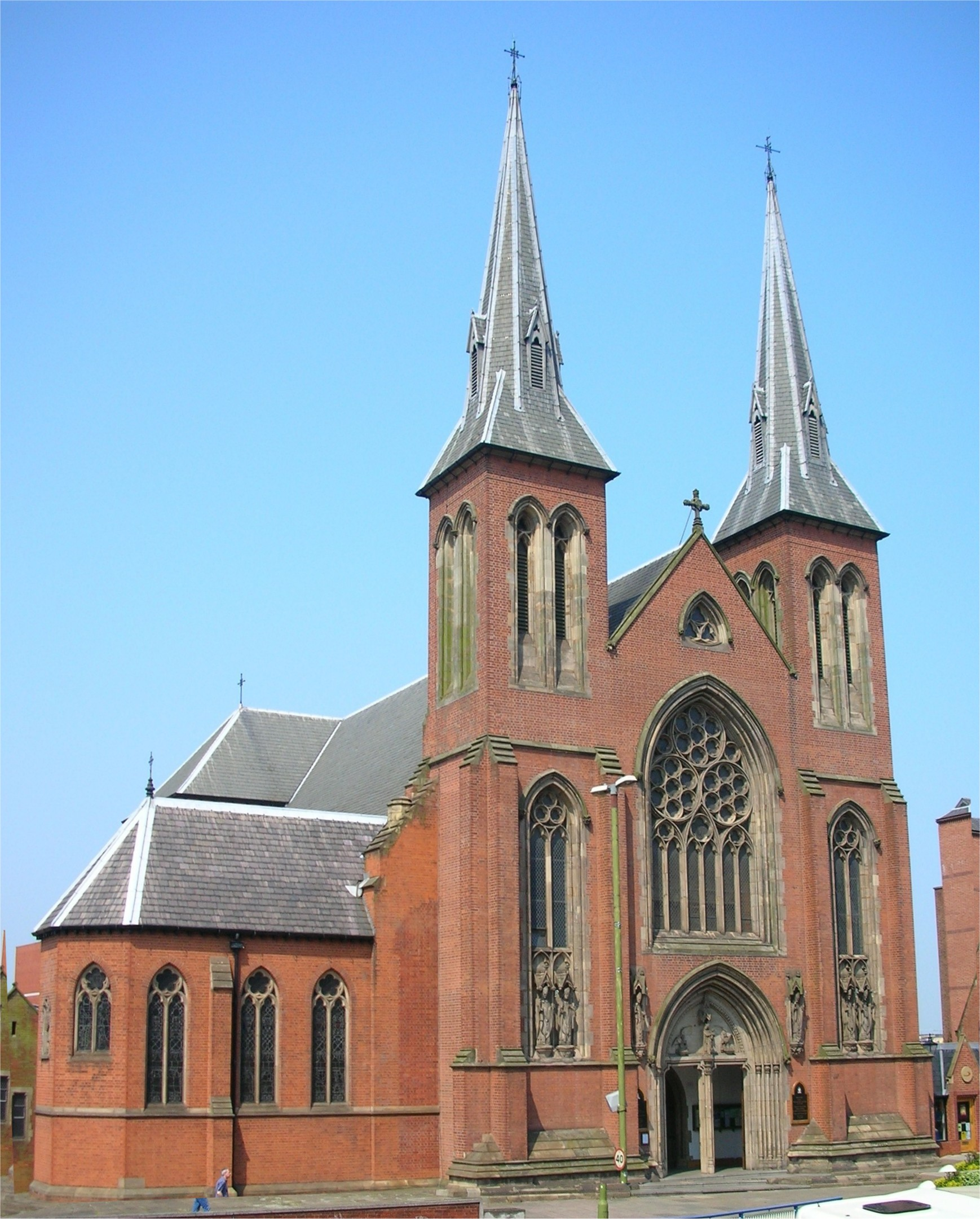
The west front

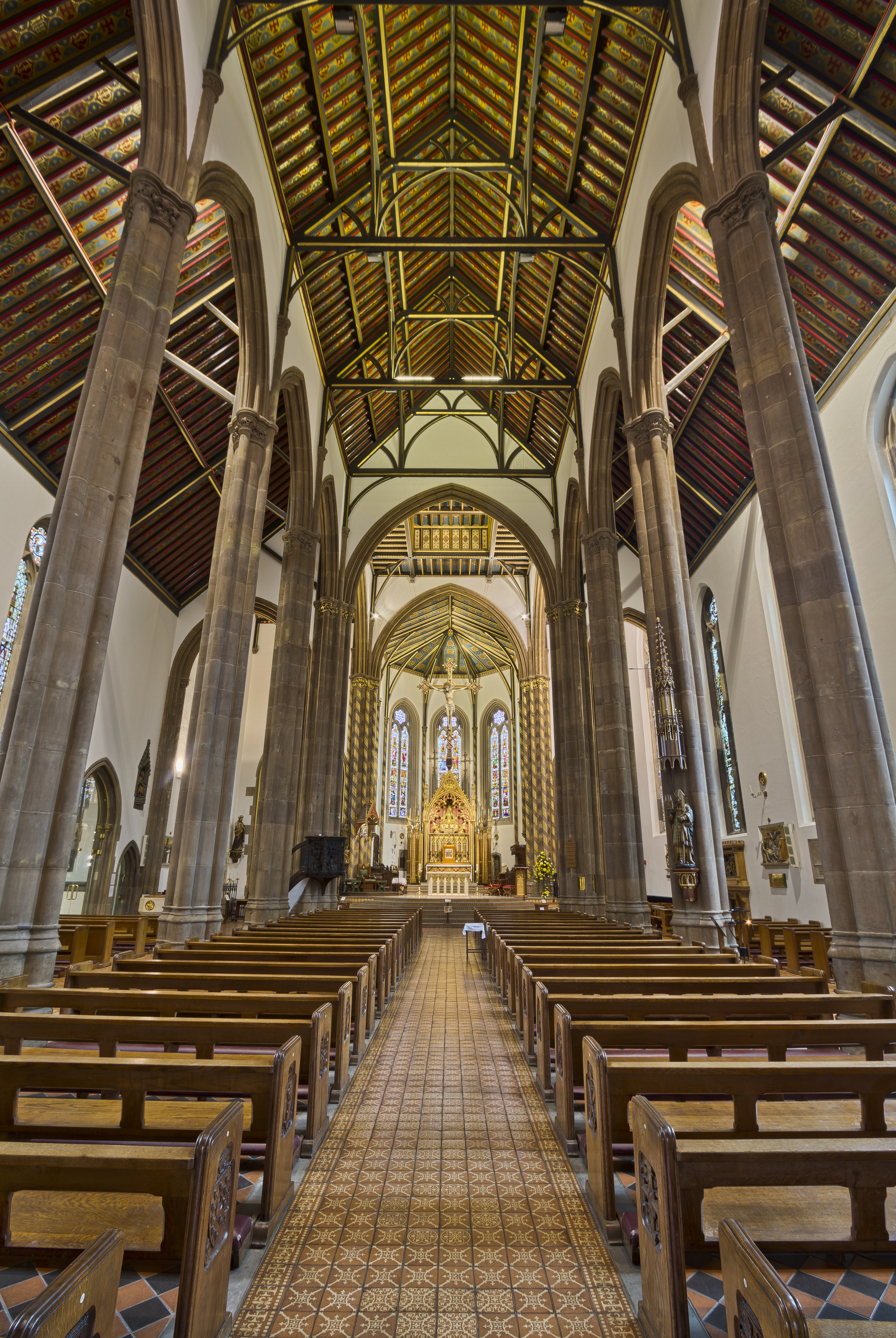
The nave

The architect chosen to design St Chad's, Augustus Welby Pugin, later became one of England's most renowned Gothic Revival architects. Pugin had converted to Catholicism in 1835, and spent most of the remainder of his working life designing Catholic churches, their fittings and vestments. St Chad's was the first large church that he designed which was planned, from the outset in 1837, to become a cathedral. Pugin lavished much care on the building, and described, in his letters, not only the architecture, but its decoration, fittings and furnishings. The Clerk of Works and builder of St Chad's was George Myers.

St Chad's replaced a smaller church dedicated to St Austin, built on the same site in 1808, in the Gunmakers' Quarter of the town on steeply sloping land that fell away to the canal and wharf. Because of the narrow site, and the necessity to build in brick rather than stone, Pugin was restricted in the style and proportions of the church that he could design. Because he wished to make the church as open and spacious as possible, he looked as a model to the style of churches that were built in Northern Germany in the late Middle Ages. St Chad's is built in the style of a brick hall church or "Hallenkirche", similar to Munich Cathedral and has a westwerk with narrow broached spires similar to those of Lübeck Cathedral. Because of the steep slope of the site, Pugin built a large crypt beneath the building, to be used primarily as a burial place for family tombs, and former cathedral clergy, and is now rehearsal room for the choir. The geographical alignment is unusual in that the "east end" (the location of the altar) actually faces approximately north west.

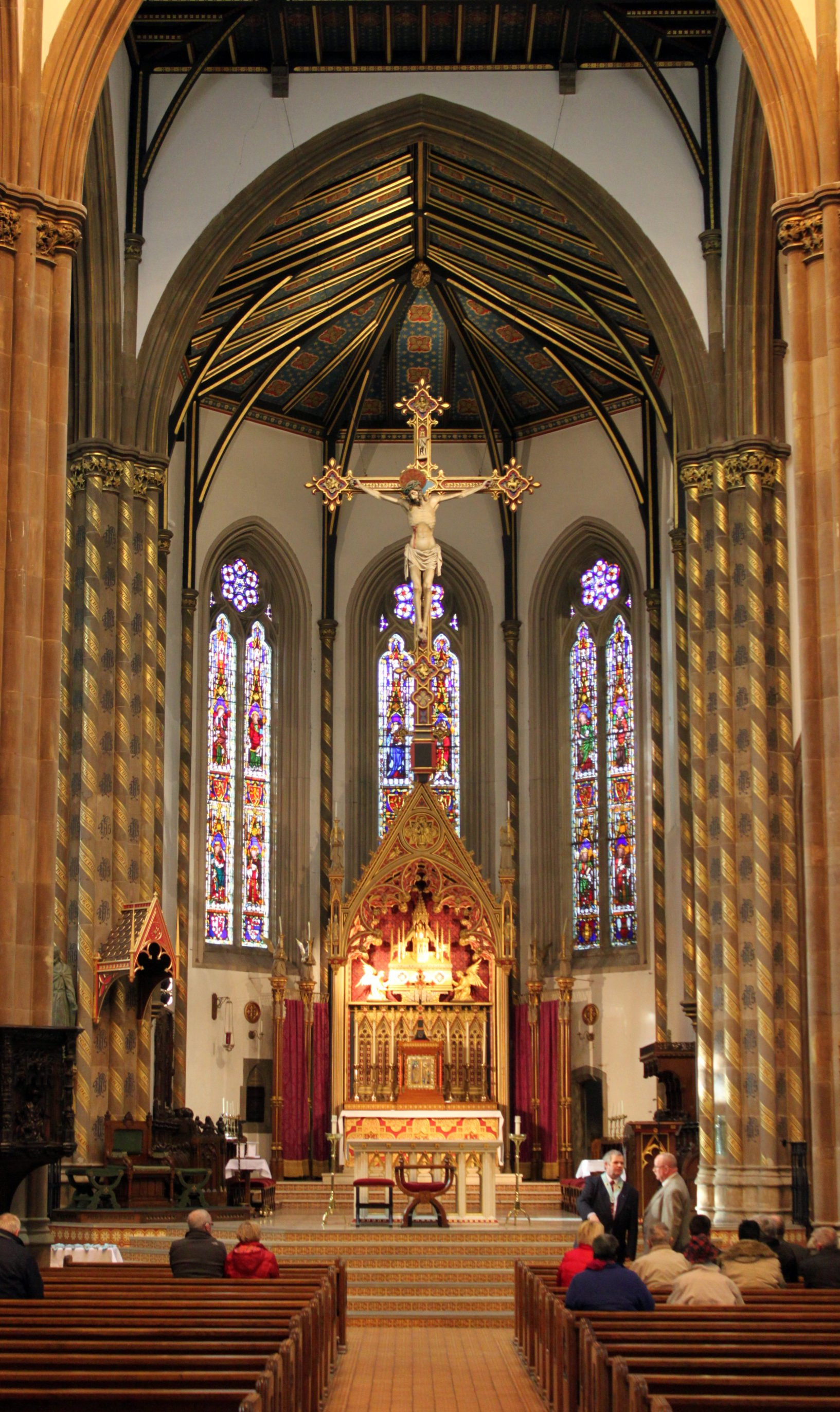
The apse

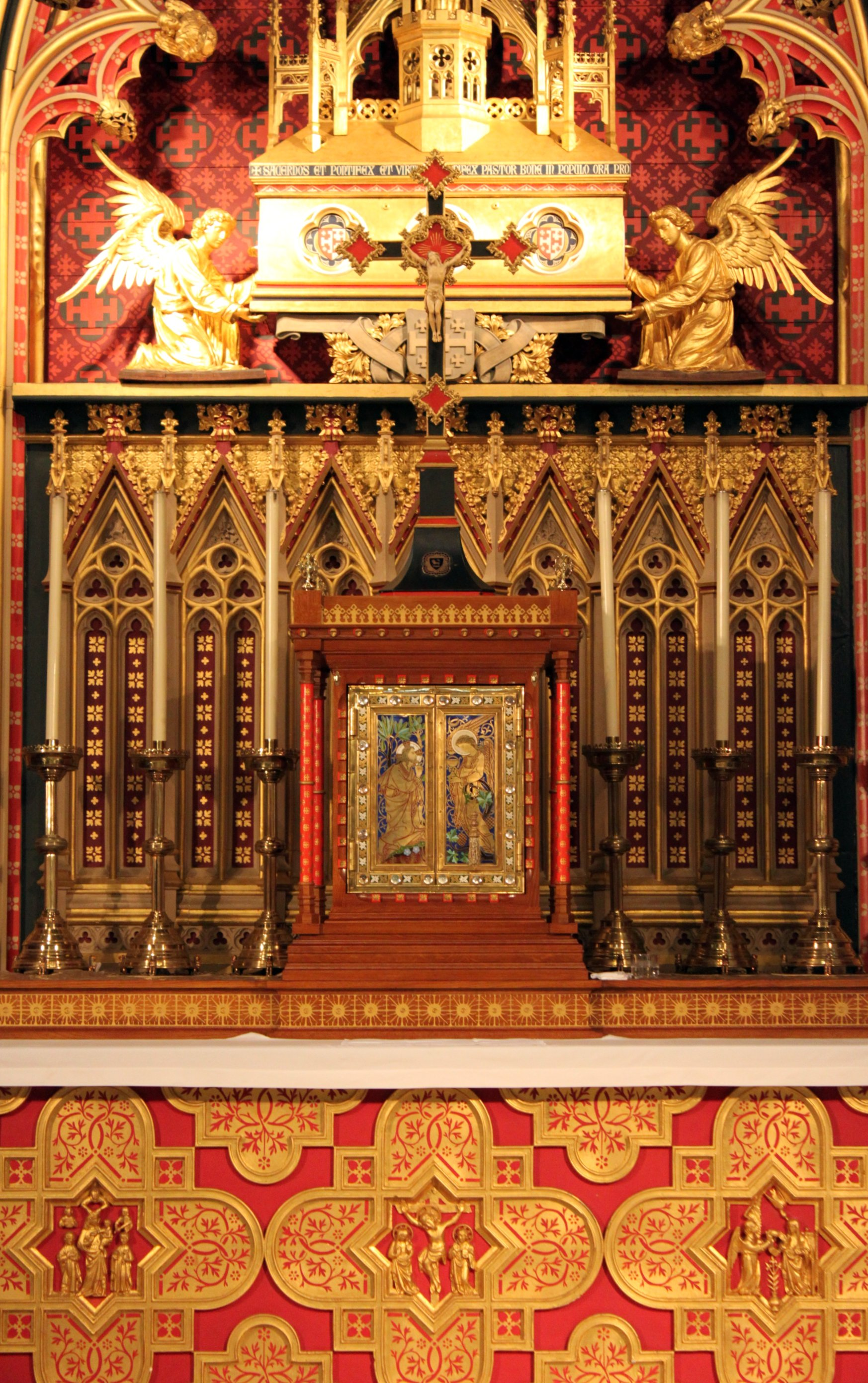
The High Altar

The interior, the nave of which is almost twice as high as it is wide, has a very high arcade, like German hall churches, carried on clusters of thin shafts, those of the chancel being decorated in paint and gold leaf with a helical pattern like a barber's pole, bearing the legend Sanctus Sanctus Sanctus Dominus Deus Sabaoth ('Holy, Holy, Holy, Lord God of Hosts'). The wooden ceiling, with curving blue trusses, is ornamented with monograms and floral patterns, inspired by the remnants of medieval decoration to be found on the ancient ceilings of Ely and Peterborough Cathedrals. Phoebe Stanton describes the ornate decoration of the ceiling as "brilliant" and so delicate that "it resembles fabric stretched over a lattice".

Pugin designed many of the fittings including the high altar under an elaborate baldachin, with riddel posts, and the choir screen. The Bishop's Chair, in oak upholstered in green velvet, backed with the diocesan shield of arms was also designed by Pugin. Other fittings, such the 16th-century carved pulpit and the medieval canons' stalls were from churches in Belgium and Germany respectively and were collected and donated by John Talbot, the 16th Earl of Shrewsbury. The sanctuary windows are the work of William Warrington. Other windows, metalwork, fittings and vestments were provided by John Hardman of Birmingham, to the design or specifications of Pugin. Hardman was a parishioner of St Chad's, founding the Cathedral Choir in 1854. Four generations of his family are among those interred in the crypt.

In 1932 St Chad's was extended by the addition of St Edward's Chapel, designed by Pugin's grandson, Sebastian Pugin Powell, and built in memory of Archbishop Edward Ilsley and his patron St Edward the Confessor. The chapel windows depict the history of the relics of St Chad, and those who have served the church there, along with some magnificent ecclesiastical coats of arms.

In the 1960s a number of the fittings, including Pugin's screen, were removed and the interior repainted, to the detriment of the original design. The rood screen was rescued by an Anglican priest, who had it re-erected in the Anglican Holy Trinity Church, Reading. Other artefacts were removed to other churches, including the giant rood crucifix, which after its removal to the Church of the Sacred Heart & St Therese, in Coleshill, was reinstated in the cathedral within the Sanctuary on the instructions of Archbishop Maurice Couve de Murville. The cathedral as it appears today is a result of post-Vatican II renovations and re-orderings, with only some of Pugin's work surviving. The original chancel arrangement was altered, again much to the detriment of its design, destroying Pugin's intent. Its appearance today is a mere shadow of how it was originally conceived by Pugin, but its enduring beauty in the face of iconoclasm is testament to the skill of its original designers. St Barnabas Cathedral in Nottingham, also by Pugin, suffered similarly, with much of the original decoration smothered with whitewash, and fittings destroyed.

The former Bishop's House, which stood nearby and was also by Pugin, was demolished in 1959 due to Road widening.

== Music ==
=== Organ ===
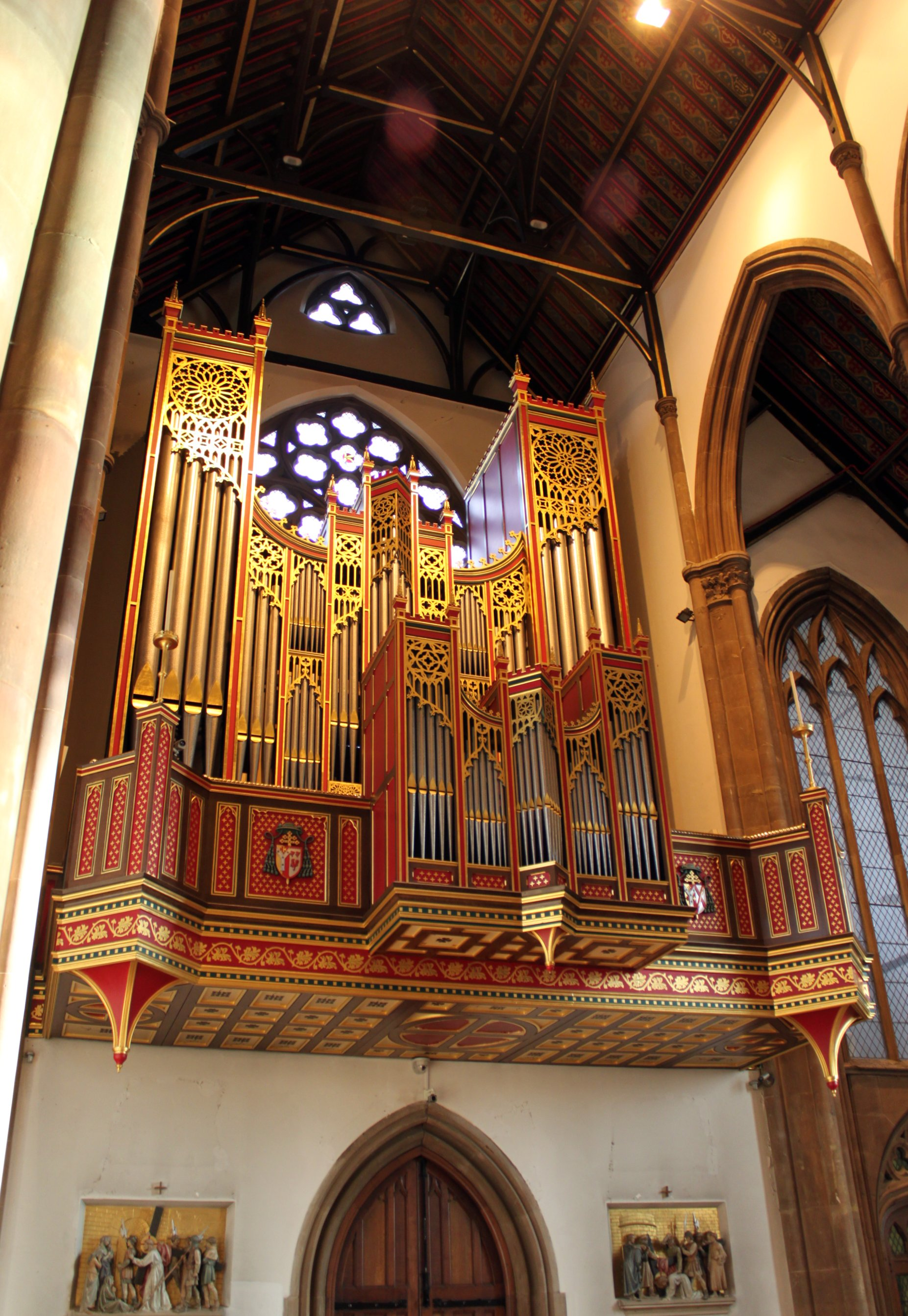
The organ

The cathedral has a three manual organ by J. W. Walker & Sons Ltd, built in 1993. It is sited at the west end of the cathedral in a magnificent case designed by David Graebe. The consultant was Nicolas Kynaston and the instrument is considered to be one of the finest mechanical organs in the country. There is a regular series of recitals, Thursday Live, on the first Thursday of every month. The organ is also used as a teaching instrument for students and staff of Birmingham Conservatoire.

The current Organist and Director of Music is Professor David Saint, Organist and Associate Director of Music: Paul Carr, Associate Organists: Nigel Morris, John Pryer (Organiste Honoraire)

==== Directors of Music ====
- 1848 – ? Meyer Lutz
- 1850s Johann Benz
- 1930-35 Henry Washington
- 1935-46 Basil Krauth
- 1958-65 Cyril Barlow
- 1965-68 Petroc Howell
- 1964–1972 Roger M. Hill (Organist)
- 1969–1972 Derek Stanley
- 1972–1978 John Harper
- 1978–present David Saint

=== Choir ===
The cathedral has had a properly constituted, surpliced choir since 1854, when it was first endowed with £1,000 by John Hardman. Hardman was for many years cantor of the choir, and is commemorated by a small white figure of him in the lower left-hand corner of a stained glass window of 1868 located in the north aisle and depicting the Immaculate Conception, with a line of plainchant along the bottom, being the Introit for the feast of the Immaculate Conception. Currently, the four-part, robed choir comprises around adult men and women who lead the worship at the Sunday Solemn Mass (at 11:00 am). They also lead the worship during Holy Week and Easter, when the archbishop presides. The choir specialises in the Latin polyphonic music of the renaissance, but sings a wide repertory of Masses and motets in English and Latin. The choir sings occasional concerts and has featured in television and radio broadcasts.

=== Bells ===
In 1840 St Chad's was presented with a single bell weighing approximately 20 long cwt (2,200 lb; 1,000 kg). In 1848 the metal from this bell was used in the casting of a ring of five bells, made by Mears of Whitechapel and hung in the north-west tower. They were augmented by three bells by Blews of Birmingham in 1877. The eight bells were first rung on Easter Sunday of that year. In 1940 the bells were recast by Taylors of Loughborough. The eight bells form a diatonic octave in the key of F Major, with the heaviest bell (the tenor) weighing 15 long cwt 3 qr 6 lb (1,770 lb or 803 kg). They are hung for full-circle ringing in the north-west tower, and are rung regularly on Sunday morning after High Mass, at about 12 noon, and at other major services by the St Chad's Cathedral Society of Change Ringers.

== Location ==
The cathedral is in a green public space near Birmingham Snow Hill railway station and is located on what is now called St. Chad's Queensway after the cathedral, at the junction with Snow Hill Queensway and Old Snow Hill (becomes Constitution Hill), part of the Birmingham Inner Ring Road constructed in the 1970s. St. Chad's is on the northern side of the road, which divides the cathedral from the city centre. In January 2017 the nearby West Midlands Metro tram stop was named St. Chads.

== Burials ==
- Chad of Mercia (c. 634–672)
- Thomas Walsh (1777–1849), buried in the crypt chapel of St Peter. A large Gothic-revival memorial to him with a recumbent effigy, designed by Pugin and carved by George Myers, was erected in the North aisle of the Cathedral in 1851, after being exhibited in the Mediaeval Court of the Great Exhibition in The Crystal Palace, Hyde Park, London.

== See also ==
- Catholic Church in Great Britain
- Dormition of the Mother of God and St Andrew, Birmingham (Greek Orthodox)
- St Philip's Cathedral, Birmingham (Church of England)

== Bibliography ==
- Tim Tatton-Brown and John Crook, The English Cathedral, New Holland (2002), ISBN 1-84330-120-2
- Phoebe Stanton, Pugin, Thames and Hudson (1971), ISBN 0-500-27016-3
