= List of people educated at St Ignatius' College =

This is a list of notable alumni of St Ignatius' College located in Enfield, London, England.

== Alumni ==
- David Brading Historian
- Peter Burke, historian
- Bernard Butler, musician
- Michael Coveney, theatre critic
- Peter Doyle, former Roman Catholic Bishop of Northampton
- Reginald Dunne, British-born WW1 soldier, later an Irish Republican Army volunteer hanged for the murder of Sir Henry Wilson
- Wojciech Giertych, Dominican theologian to the Papal Household
- Brian Hanrahan, BBC Diplomatic Editor
- John Carmel Cardinal Heenan, Head of the Roman Catholic Church in England and Wales 1965-75
- Sir Alfred Hitchcock, film director
- Brian Keaney, children's author
- Jo Kuffour, footballer
- Donal Logue, Canadian-born American actor, writer
- Dermi Lusala, footballer for Coventry City
- Sir George Martin, signed The Beatles and greatly influenced their sound and success by producing many of their albums, including the 1967 Sgt Pepper's Lonely Hearts Club Band
- John Maybury, filmmaker
- Paul McKenna, hypnotist
- TJ Moncur, English footballer who plays for Cray Wanderers FC in the Isthmian League Premier Division
- Kenny Morris, drummer in Siouxsie and the Banshees
- Terence Patrick O'Sullivan, civil engineer
- Edmund Purdom, British actor and producer; star of the 1954 MGM film The Student Prince
- Sarbel (born Sarbel Michael), Greek Cypriot musician
- George Sewell, actor, Get Carter, Z-Cars, Canned Carrott
- Dave Sexton, Manchester United F.C. manager (1977–1981)
- Adrian Smith, guitarist with Iron Maiden
- Gerard Woodward, Booker-shortlisted novelist and poet
- Regé-Jean Page, Actor (Bridgerton)
- Kevin Hyland OBE, First Independent Anti-Slavery Commissioner, police officer & army Royal Military Police
