= St Thomas More Catholic School, Bedford =

St Thomas More Catholic School

Location
- Tyne Crescent; Brickhill; Bedford, Bedfordshire, MK41 7UL; England; 52°09′42″N 0°27′48″W

Information
- Type: Academy
- Motto: Latin: Primus Servus Dei
- Religious affiliation: Roman Catholic
- Established: 1979
- Trust: OLICAT
- Department for Education URN: 139517 Tables
- Ofsted: Reports
- Head teacher: Martin Bonner
- Gender: Mixed
- Age: 11 to 18
- Enrolment: 827 as of January 2016
- Colours: Black, Gold & Green
- Publication: More News (Termly)
- Website: http://www.st-thomasmore.org.uk

St Thomas More Catholic School is a mixed secondary school and sixth form located in Bedford in the English county of Bedfordshire.

The school is located on Tyne Crescent in the Brickhill area of north Bedford. The school has no specific catchment area due to it being a Catholic school (although it accepts pupils of all backgrounds), but attracts students from all over Bedford and the surrounding villages. The school is named after the Catholic martyr Sir Thomas More.

== History ==
Following the 1967 Plowden Report, Bedfordshire LEA decided to implement the three-tier education system of lower, middle and upper schools in the county. This created a need for a new Roman Catholic upper school (ages 13 to 18) in Bedford.

During 1977 and 1978, as the new school buildings in Brickhill were not ready for occupation, St Thomas More Upper School began teaching in the Westbourne Centre next to Westbourne School in Queens Park. Science classes were taken at Westfield School in Queens Park. The pupils were driven there by school bus.

St Thomas More Catholic School was formally opened in 1979 by Baroness Shirley Williams (then Secretary of State for Education and Science). The dedication Mass was conducted by Bishop Charles Alexander Grant (then Bishop of Northampton).

When St Bedes Middle school closed in 2006, academic years 7 and 8 were transferred to St Thomas More School, along with some of the teaching staff.

In July 2008 the school was awarded specialist status as a Humanities College, with English acting as the lead department. In 2007 English results placed the school in the top two per cent nationally.

In 2009 the school was recognised as consistently achieving the highest levels of improvement by pupils between the ages of 11 and 16 of any state school in Bedfordshire. In July 2011, the school become one of the first in the country to be granted teaching school status – a designation entitling it to lead the training and professional development of staff.

In 2012 The Federation of Bedford Catholic Schools' Governing Body launched a consultation on whether to convert its four schools into a federated academy trust. The school converted to academy status as part of the St Francis of Assisi Academies Trust in April 2013. In February 2020 the trust became part of Our Lady Immaculate Catholic Academies Trust (OLICAT).

From September 2014 the school began admitting pupils from year 7 (age 11), therefore converting from an upper school to a full secondary school.

=== Head teachers ===
Anthony Doyle was the first headmaster from 1977 until his death in 1982. John McManus was the second Headmaster and Steve Watts became the third headmaster following McManus's retirement in 1994. Alan Lee became Headmaster in 2002. After Alan Lee left, and became the head of the Catholic Federation, Joe Richardson took over as headmaster, and left in 2014, leaving Alison Wilshaw to become headteacher. Alison left the school in 2019 and the role of Head Teacher was taken by Martin Bonner.

== The school today ==
St Thomas More Catholic School currently serves children aged 11–18 from all over the Borough of Bedford. It is part of Our Lady Immaculate Catholic Academies Trust (OLICAT), under the guidance of the Roman Catholic Diocese of Northampton. The other Catholic schools within Bedford are St Joseph's and St Gregory's Primary School and St John Rigby Primary School.

== Notable former pupils ==
- Bright Arrey-Mbi, footballer
- Tom Grennan, musician
- Lil Silva, Musician
- Alex Browning, Director and Writer
