= Frank Thomas (disambiguation) =

Frank Thomas (born 1968) is an American Hall of Fame baseball player.

Frank Thomas may also refer to:

== Arts and entertainment ==
- Frank M. Thomas (1889–1989), American actor, father of Frankie Thomas
- Frank Thomas (animator) (1912–2004), American animator for Walt Disney
- Frank Thomas (comics) (1914–1968), American cartoonist, creator of The Eye and Fantom of the Fair
- Frankie Thomas (1921–2006), American actor and author
- Frank Thomas (songwriter) (1936–2017), French songwriter
- Frank J. Thomas (printer) (1936–2019), American photographer, typographer and printer

== Sports ==
- Frank Thomas (English cricketer) (1877–1924), English cricketer
- Frank Thomas (American football) (1898–1954), American football player and coach
- Frank Thomas (Australian footballer) (1905–2001), Australian rules footballer who played with Hawthorn and Sturt
- Frankie Thomas (cyclist) (1906–1978), Australian cyclist
- Frank Thomas (Barbadian cricketer) (1924–2010), Barbadian cricketer
- Frank Thomas (outfielder) (1929–2023), American baseball player

== Others ==
- Frank Thomas (bishop) (1930–1988), English prelate of the Roman Catholic Church

== See also ==
- Francis Thomas (disambiguation)
- Franklin Thomas (disambiguation)
- Thomas Frank (disambiguation)
