= Frank J. Thomas =

Frank J. Thomas may refer to:

- Frank Thomas (outfielder) (Frank Joseph Thomas), American baseball player
- Frank J. Thomas (printer), American photographer, typographer, and printer

== See also ==
- Frank Thomas (disambiguation)
