= Francis Thomas (disambiguation) =

Francis Thomas (1799–1876) was an American politician and Governor of Maryland.

Francis Thomas may also refer to:

- Francis A. Thomas (1826–1899), American physician and New York City politician
- Francis Wolferstan Thomas (1834–1900), Canadian banker and philanthropist
- Frank Thomas (bishop) (1930–1988), English prelate of the Roman Catholic Church
- Francis Thomas (politician) (1912–1977), Singaporean former politician and educator
- Francis Xavier Thomas (1906−1985), Australian Roman Catholic bishop

== See also ==
- Frank Thomas (disambiguation)
- Thomas Francis (disambiguation)
- Funmilayo Ransome-Kuti (Frances Abigail Olufunmilayo Thomas, 1900−1978), Nigerian chieftain, feminist and politician
