= Arthur Riddell =

British Catholic bishop

Arthur George Riddell
- Bishop of Northampton
- Church: Catholic Church
- Diocese: Diocese of Northampton
- In office: 27 April 1880 – 15 September 1907
- Predecessor: Francis Amherst
- Successor: Frederick Keating

Orders
- Ordination: 24 September 1858
- Consecration: 9 June 1880 by Robert Cornthwaite

Personal details
- Born: 15 September 1836 Barnard Castle, County Durham, United Kingdom of Great Britain and Ireland
- Died: 15 September 1907 (aged 71)

Bishop Arthur George Riddell (born 15 September 1836, Barnard Castle, County Durham – died 15 September 1907, England, UK) was the Roman Catholic Bishop of Northampton from 1880 until his death in 1907.

On 24 September 1858, aged 22, he was ordained a priest for the Diocese of Beverley at Ushaw in County Durham by Bishops Robert Cornthwaite, Francis Kerril Amherst and Richard Lacy.

On 27 April 1880, aged 43, he was appointed as Bishop of Northampton and ordained two months later on 9 June 1880.

He died in 1907, aged 71. He had been a priest for 49 years and a bishop for 27 years. Riddell is buried at The Cathedral Church of St Mary and St Thomas.

Catholic Church titles
Preceded by Francis Amherst	Bishop of Northampton; 1880–1907	Succeeded by Frederick Keating
