= St Ignatius College, Enfield =

School in Enfield, Greater London, England

St Ignatius College

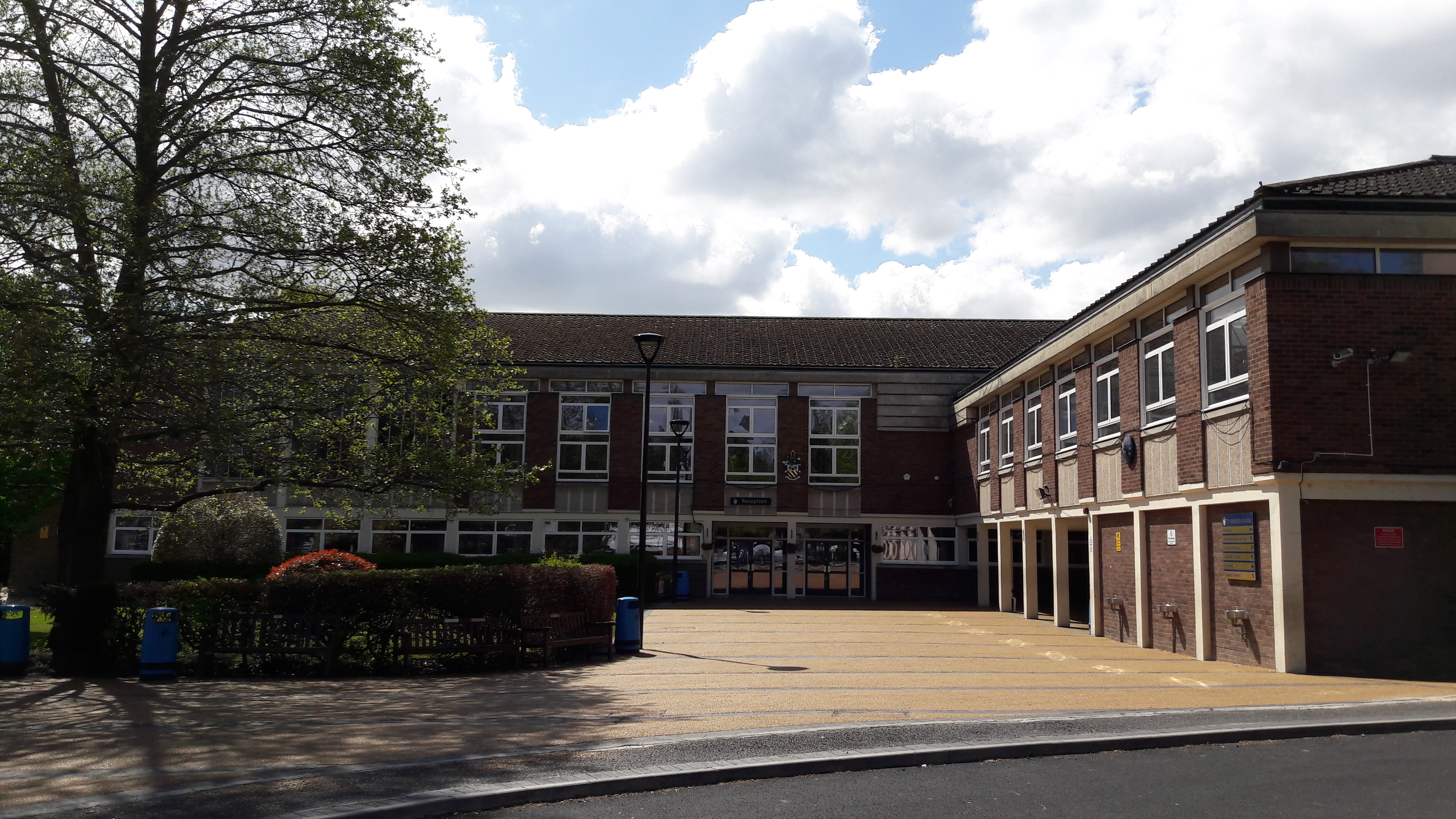
- College entrance

Location
- Turkey Street, Enfield, Greater London, EN1 4NP; England; 51°40′23″N 0°03′21″W

Information
- Type: Voluntary aided comprehensive All-Boys
- Motto: Ad maiorem Dei gloriam (Latin) (For the greater glory of God)
- Religious affiliation: Roman Catholic (Jesuit)
- Established: 10 September 1894; 132 years ago
- Founder: the Society of Jesus (the Jesuits)
- Chairman: John Donnelly
- Headteacher: Natasha Socrates
- Enrollment: 1,107
- Alumni: Old Ignatians
- Website: www.st-ignatius.enfield.sch.uk

St Ignatius College is a Catholic voluntary aided secondary school for boys aged 11–18 in Enfield, London, England, founded by the Society of Jesus in 1894 and completely moved to its present site by 1987. It was a grammar school until 1968, only accepting boys who had passed the Eleven plus exam. Former students include Alfred Hitchcock, George Martin, and John Cardinal Heenan.

== History ==
The school was founded in Stamford Hill, South Tottenham, London, on 10 September 1894. The college and the Jesuit community were initially accommodated in two houses called Morecombe Lodge and Burleigh House, located on Tottenham High Road, next to St Ignatius Church, Stamford Hill. The school originally had only 46 boys, four Jesuits, and a dog in 1894. In 1907 the college was recognised by the Board of Education and began to receive public money towards its support.

In 1944, the college's preparatory department became its own private school run by the Jesuits, Loyola Preparatory School. In 1950, Loyola Preparatory School moved to a site in Buckhurst Hill in Essex that was formerly occupied by Braeside School. In 1962, The Campion School, a Jesuit secondary school, was opened in Hornchurch, making Loyola Preparatory School a feeder school for both the college and The Campion School. In 2001, trusteeship of Loyola Preparatory School was given to the Diocese of Brentwood.

From the early 1950s the school complement averaged about 700 boys. Its longest-serving Headmaster, Fr Guy Brinkworth SJ, retired in 1963. The school remained at Stamford Hill as a grammar school until 1968. The school then became a two-tier, seven-form entry comprehensive school, the lower school being located at the old Cardinal Allen School, which had been there for eight years prior to the school moving there, and the upper school located in Turkey Street, Enfield.

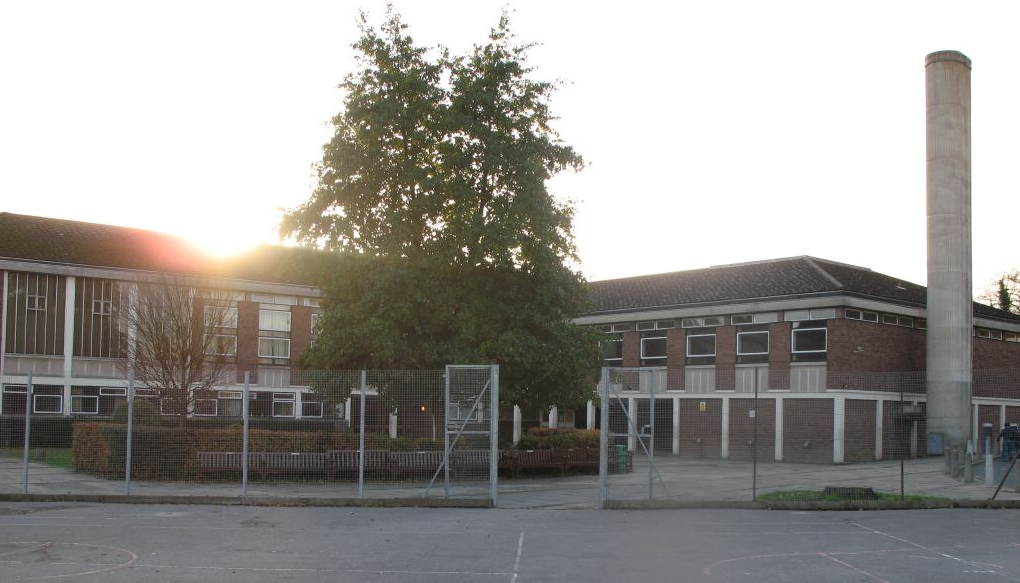
Turkey Street Building in 2006

In 1987, the lower and upper schools amalgamated at Turkey Street, a development made possible by a major building programme, including an extension to the main building. The school became grant-maintained in 1993, but returned to Voluntary Aided status in September 1999. In 1998 the school started to build the Octagon which houses a computer suite, chapel and a library. The building work was completed in 2000 and was handed over to the school later that year. Also in 2000, Roselands, previously the residence for the Jesuits, was refurbished. It became the Roselands Centre, housing the Sixth Form. In 2023, school enrolment was 1,107.

Michael Blundell became the college's first lay Headmaster when he succeeded Fr Antony Forrester SJ, in 1986. Mr Blundell was, in turn, succeeded as Headmaster by Paul Adams, who retired in the summer of 2007, and was replaced by John-Paul Morrison, who left the post of headmaster in December 2013. Andrew Dickson took over the post on an interim basis until a replacement for John-Paul Morrison could be found. Kelly took over from Dickson in 2014 and retired from his role in 2016 and was succeeded by Mary O'Keeffe, the first female headteacher of a Jesuit secondary school in the United Kingdom. Upon O'Keefe's retirement in July 2025, Natasha Socretes became the new headteacher.

In 2019, the college was rated as "Good" by Ofsted. In 2023, the school was one of those identified as having buildings that could be structurally unsound because reinforced autoclaved aerated concrete had been used in their construction. In 2025, the school was re-inspected by Ofsted and found to be Outstanding in all areas except sixth form provision, which was rated Good.

=== Headteachers and prefects of studies ===
At first, the school was led not by a headteacher, but a "prefect of studies". These were:

- Fr A Cortie SJ (1894)
- Fr P Flynn SJ (1895)
- Fr A Kopp SJ (1896)
- Fr C Newdigate SJ (1897)
- Fr F Holme SJ (1899)
- Fr C Newdigate SJ (1900)
- Fr J Keating SJ (1904)
- Fr T Donnelly SJ (1904)
- Fr C Newdigate SJ (1905)
- Fr W McMahon SJ (1914)
- Fr J Small SJ (1916)
- Fr I Scoles SJ (1918)

From 1932, the school instead had a more conventional headteacher. These were:

- Fr C Charlier SJ (1932)
- Fr G Brinkworth SJ (1939)
- Fr M Flannery SJ (1963)
- Fr P Hackett SJ (1965)
- Fr A Forrester SJ (1972)
- Mr M Blundell (1987)
- Mr P Adams (2003)
- Mr J-P Morrison (2008)
- Mr A Dickson (Acting Jan-Sep 2014)
- Mr M Kelly (2014)
- Mrs M O'Keefe (2016)
- Ms N Socrates (2025)

== Spiritual development ==
The college aims to assist each individual pupil in his spiritual development. This spiritual development includes retreats as pupils progress through the school. The school motto Ad maiorem Dei gloriam – meaning "For the greater glory of God" – was abbreviated to AMDG and is still customarily appended to students' essays or homework.

There are opportunities for pupils regularly to take part in retreats, devised and directed according to their stage at the school, is an essential part of the Jesuit educational ideal. A retreat is a time when, away from their usual environments of home and school, the pupils can reflect on their lives and on their relationships with others and with God. Retreat days take place each year in the Pastoral Centre or outside of the college, for example in the St Cassian's Centre at Kintbury.

== Houses ==
College Coat of Arms

The school has forms that are named after seven Jesuit martyrs. The St Francis Xavier form was added as commemoration for the college's 125th Anniversary.

- Garnet, after St Thomas Garnet, SJ (1575–1608)
- Southwell, after St Robert Southwell, SJ (1560–1595)
- Arrowsmith, after St Edmund Arrowsmith, SJ (1585–1628)
- Campion, after St Edmund Campion, SJ (1540–1581)
- Lewis, after St David Lewis, SJ (1616–1679)
- Page, after Blessed Francis Page, SJ (15?? - 1602)
- Xavier, after St Francis Xavier, SJ (1506 - 1552)

== Extracurricular activities ==
=== Publications ===
==== The Ignatian ====
The Ignatian, the college magazine, is published yearly and features a selection of highlights from the previous school year.

==== Yearbook ====
From 2006, there is a yearbook for the outgoing year 11, with an art pupil being asked to produce its front cover.

==== College newsletter ====
Every Half Term a newsletter, summarising the college's achievements for that half term, is published. It includes a list of merits attained for that half term.

=== CCF ===
The college has a contingent of the Combined Cadet Force centred at the CCF hut. The contingent has both an Army Section and a Royal Air Force (RAF) Section. Weekly Section training takes place on Mondays at the college. Cadets also get the chance to attend camps, Field Training Exercises (FTX), Adventurous Training (AT), and courses throughout the UK and occasionally abroad. Courses include flying, parachuting, signalling, catering, physical training instructor (PTI), schoolboy commando course, mountain leader training, and rock climbing.

=== Sports ===
Sports played at the college include: Football, Rugby union, Basketball, Tennis, Cross country running, Cricket, Swimming, and Cycling. The school regularly attends sporting tournaments. The under-12s won a mini-bus for the school at a tournament. The school recently signed a deal with Tottenham Hotspur to allow the use of Tottenham's playing fields.

== Old Ignatian Association ==
Former pupils of the school are commonly referred to as Old Ignatians. The main objective of the Old Ignatian Association is to serve the interests of the former pupils of the college. They provide spiritual, social, recreational, and sporting facilities so that they may serve the interests of not only the Old Ignatians but also of current pupils.

In the early 1960s, they bought a sports ground and built a pavilion built on a site in Woodford. However, in the 1970s the site was compulsorily purchased for the construction of the M11.

In 1999, the Old Ignatians purchased a former sports ground in Turkey Street, Enfield, to build a social centre and to provide some new sporting facilities that were not available in the Woodford centre. In 2008, "The Loyola Ground" was opened and is used by the association as well as the school for sporting, social, and many other events.

== Notable alumni ==
- Reuben Arthur, track and field sprinter
- David Brading Historian
- Peter Burke, historian
- Bernard Butler, musician
- Michael Coveney, theatre critic
- Clavish, musician
- Peter Doyle, former Roman Catholic Bishop of Northampton
- Reginald Dunne, British-born WW1 soldier, later an Irish Republican Army volunteer
- Wojciech Giertych, Dominican theologian to the Papal Household
- Brian Hanrahan, BBC Diplomatic Editor
- John Cardinal Heenan, Archbishop of Westminster 1965-75
- Sir Alfred Hitchcock, film director
- Brian Keaney, children's author
- Jo Kuffour, footballer
- Donal Logue, Canadian-born American actor, writer
- Dermi Lusala, footballer for Coventry City
- Sir George Martin, producer for The Beatles
- John Maybury, filmmaker
- Paul McKenna, hypnotist
- TJ Moncur, English footballer who plays for Cray Wanderers FC
- Kenny Morris, drummer in Siouxsie and the Banshees
- Terence Patrick O'Sullivan, civil engineer
- Edmund Purdom, British actor and producer
- Sarbel (born Sarbel Michael), Greek Cypriot musician
- George Sewell, actor, Get Carter, Z-Cars, Canned Carrott
- Dave Sexton, Manchester United F.C. manager (1977–1981)
- Adrian Smith, guitarist with Iron Maiden
- Gerard Woodward, Booker-shortlisted novelist and poet
- Regé-Jean Page, Actor (Bridgerton)
- Kevin Hyland OBE, First Independent Anti-Slavery Commissioner, police officer & army Royal Military Police

== See also ==
- List of Jesuit sites in the United Kingdom
- List of Jesuit schools
