= Vicar Apostolic of the Eastern District =

The Vicar Apostolic of the Eastern District may refer to:

- Vicar Apostolic of the Eastern District (England), a precursor title of the Roman Catholic Bishop of Northampton.
- Vicar Apostolic of the Eastern District (Scotland), a precursor title of the Roman Catholic Archbishop of St Andrews and Edinburgh.
