= Apostolic Vicariate of the Eastern District =

The Vicariate Apostolic of the Eastern District may refer to:

- Vicariate Apostolic of the Eastern District (England), a predecessor name for the Roman Catholic Diocese of Northampton.
- Vicariate Apostolic of the Eastern District (Scotland), a predecessor name for the Roman Catholic Archdiocese of St Andrews and Edinburgh.
