= Paul Adams (umpire) =

English cricket umpire

Personal information
- Full name: Paul Adams
- Born: 22 December 1949 (age 76); East Ham, Essex, England

Umpiring information
- WODIs umpired: 1 (2001)
- FC umpired: 23 (1992–2002)
- LA umpired: 13 (1991–2002)
- Source: CricketArchive, 18 March 2021

Paul Adams (born 22 December 1949) is an English former cricket umpire.

A schoolmaster by profession, Adams began officiating in county cricket in 1987 in the Minor Counties Championship and between 1989 and 2001 he stood in a total of 13 Championship and Knockout Finals. He first officiated in List A one-day matches in 1991, when he stood at Canterbury in the match between Kent and Cambridgeshire in the NatWest Trophy. Adams officiated in List A matches until 2002, standing in 12 matches in the NatWest Trophy (and from 2001, its successor the Cheltenham & Gloucester Trophy), in addition to standing in one match between first-class counties in the 2001 Norwich Union League.

In addition to standing in List A matches, Adams also stood in 23 first-class matches from 1992 to 2002, following an invitation to join the first-class reserve umpires list for 1992. The matches he stood in typically involved touring sides playing county opponents, or Oxford and Cambridge Universities. None of the 23 first-class matches that he stood in were in the County Championship. Besides umpiring in men's cricket, Adams also umpired in a Women's One Day International between England and Australia at Derby in 2001. He was the headmaster of St Ignatius' College in Enfield, before retiring in 2007.
