= Thomas Franck =

Thomas Franck may refer to:

- Thomas M. Franck (1931–2009), American international law scholar
- Thomas Franck (footballer) (born 1971), German footballer

== See also ==
- Thomas Frank (disambiguation)
