= Peter Doyle (bishop) =

UK Catholic bishop

The Right Reverend Peter Doyle
- Bishop emeritus of Northampton
- Church: Roman Catholic Church
- Province: Westminster
- Diocese: Northampton
- Appointed: 24 May 2005
- Installed: 28 June 2005
- Term ended: 19 March 2020
- Predecessor: Kevin John Patrick McDonald
- Successor: David Oakley

Orders
- Ordination: 8 June 1968 by Derek Worlock
- Consecration: 28 June 2005 by Cormac Murphy-O'Connor

Personal details
- Born: Peter John Haworth Doyle; 3 May 1944 (age 82) Blackburn, England
- Denomination: Roman Catholic
- Motto: facere judicium et dilicere caritatem
- Coat of arms

Peter John Haworth Doyle (born 3 May 1944) is the retired Roman Catholic bishop of Northampton.

== Early life ==
Doyle was born on 3 May 1944 in Wilpshire, Lancashire, the son of John Robert Doyle and his wife Alice Gertrude (née Haworth) Doyle was educated at St Ignatius' College, Stamford Hill, London, before ordination as a priest in 1968.

== Career ==
Doyle was a curate at Portsmouth and Windsor from 1968 to 1975, then administrator of the Cathedral of St John the Evangelist, Portsmouth, 1975 to 1987, parish priest of St Joseph's, Maidenhead, 1987 to 1991 and of St Peter's, Winchester, 1991 to 2005, and concurrently a canon of St John's Cathedral, Portsmouth, from 1983 to 2005.

Doyle's appointment to Northampton was Pope Benedict XVI's first senior appointment in the Roman Catholic Church in Britain. He was consecrated at Northampton Cathedral on 28 June 2005 by Cormac Murphy-O'Connor. He retired in 2020 and returned to live in Hampshire.

== Sportsman ==
Doyle played for rugby football clubs in Windsor and Portsmouth, plays golf, and enjoys skiing.

== Lourdes ==
Doyle actively encourages people to travel to Lourdes, to which he has a great attachment.

The Northampton diocese, together with the dioceses of Clifton, East Anglia, Portsmouth and Southwark, plus Stonyhurst College travel each year with the Catholic Association Pilgrimage to Lourdes. Doyle became the patron of the Catholic Association Hospitalité from 2012, on the retirement of Bishop Crispian Hollis.

Catholic Church titles
Preceded by Kevin McDonald	Bishop of Northampton; 2005 to 2020	Succeeded by David Oakley
