= St Etheldreda's Church, Ely =

Roman Catholic diocesan shrine and parish church in Ely, Cambridgeshire, England

St Etheldreda's
- Shrine and Parish Church of St Etheldreda, Ely
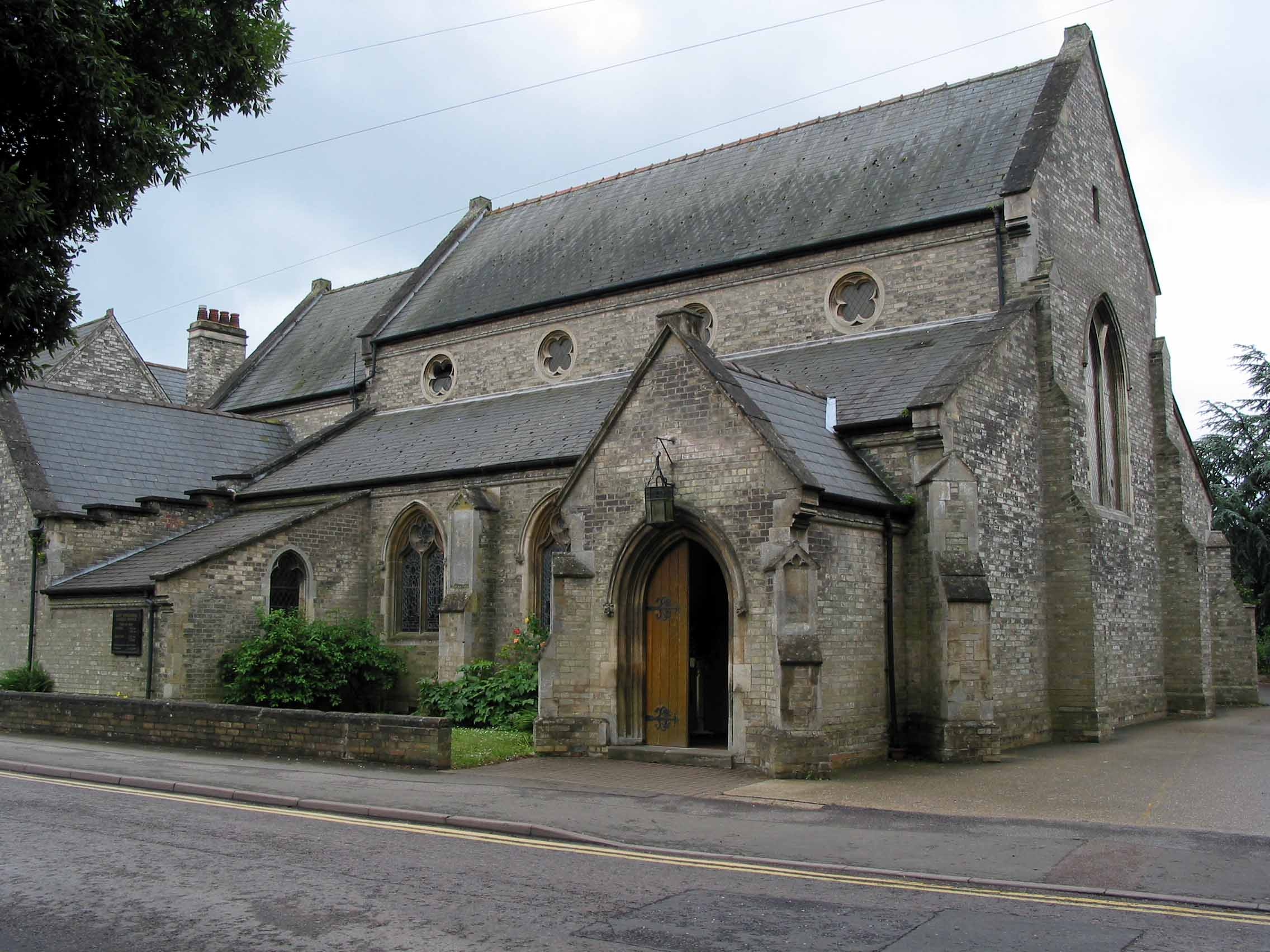
- St Etheldreda's
- 52.401725°N 0.261408°E
- OS grid reference: TL 53943 80593
- Location: 19 Egremont Street, Ely, Cambs, CB6 1AE
- Country: England
- Denomination: Roman Catholic
- Website: https://elyrcchurch.com

Architecture
- Style: Gothic Revival
- Years built: 1903

Administration
- Diocese: Diocese of East Anglia

Clergy
- Bishop: Peter Collins
- Priest: Fr David Finegan

St Etheldreda's Church is a Roman Catholic parish church in Ely, Cambridgeshire, England. It is part of the Diocese of East Anglia within the Province of Westminster.

The church notably contains the national shrine and relics of St Etheldreda, an Anglo-Saxon queen and abbess who died on 23 June AD 679 and went on to become one of the most popular of the medieval saints in England. She has even been described as one of "the most significant of all native English Saints."

== History of the parish and church ==
By the middle of the nineteenth century the town of Ely had approximately 600 families and there were some 30-40 Catholics living in the district. but there was no resident priest. At that time there was a single missionary rector based in Cambridge, Canon Thomas Quinlivan. The opening of the London to Norwich railway line in July 1845 made it easier for Canon Quinlivan to travel to Ely and say occasional masses in a private house in the town.

The parish of St Etheldreda began as a distinct and separate mission in 1890 when Fr John Francis Freeland was sent to Ely and opened the first place of worship by partitioning his lodging room to create a tiny chapel. In 1891 the population of Ely numbered 8017 and the first Roman Catholic congregation numbered just 16 worshippers. With numbers rising, Fr Freeland purchased ground and opened a small corrugated-iron chapel in 1892 on part of the site upon which the later St Etheldreda's church would be built.

The original iron church still exists at Thorney Toll as it was used as a chapel until about 1973, dedicated to St Patrick. It was then sold and used as a garage.

When the parish church opened in 1892 the services offered were as follows:

- Sunday mass at 8.30 a.m. and 11 a.m.
- catechism 3 p.m. & rosary, instruction & benediction 6.30 p.m.
- daily mass 8 a.m., holidays of obligation, mass 9 a.m.

The parish grew gradually, numbering about 100 by the early 1930s. In the period around and after, the Second World War, there were up to 300,000 Italian and German Prisoners of War based in the Fens, a number of whom were based at a camp in Ely and worshipped at St Etheldreda's.

== Architecture and appearance of the church ==
The current church was opened on 17 October 1903, on the feast of the translation of St Etheldreda's relics. Due to the finances at the time of opening, the church was not consecrated until 22 May 1987.

The architect of the church was Simon Croot of Brampton and the builders were Messrs Howard of Huntingdon. The church was built for a cost of £2,600 with the Presbytery costing a further £900

The parish church was dedicated to St Etheldreda because she died in Ely.

The church is built in Decorated Gothic style, with a separate elevated sanctuary and two aisles. It contains a number of stained glass windows which depict:

- St Peter
- St Pius X
- St Margaret Clitheroe
- St John Houghton
- St Francis
- St John the Evangelist
- The Good Shepherd
- Jesus as Priest

The original organ was by the Positive Organ Company.

The original stained glass was supplied by Messrs Jones & Willis of London and Birmingham. The main window behind the Altar depicts St Wilfrid, Our Lady and St Etheldreda. The window is a conscious copy of a similar window to be found in York Minster.

== Parish priests and clergy ==
The clergy resident in the parish have been as follows:

Parish Priest	Date at St Etheldreda's
Rev. John Francis Freeland	1890–1906, died 7 Dec 1940
Rev. Henry Long	1906–1908, died 16 April 1936
Rev. George Frederick Stokes	1908–1928, died 2 Jun 1928
Rev. Henry George Hughes	1928–1933, died 29 Nov 1943
Rev. Constantine Ketterer	1933–1940, died 18 Dec 1940
Rev. Christopher McGregor	1941–1943, died 20 Jun 1943
Rev. Charles Alexander Grant	1943–1945, died 24 Apr 1989
Rev. Albert E Whyatt	1945–1946, died 21 Mar 1991
Mgr Canon James Bernard Marshall	1946–1947, died 31 Dec 1946
Rev. Guy Pritchard	1947–1970, died 3 Jan 1983
Rev. Brendan Peters	1970–1980, died 29 May 1991
Rev. Gerard Quigley	1980–1980
Canon Paul Taylor	1980–1993, died 27 Aug 2002
Rt Rev. Mgr Michael Cassidy	1994–1995
Rev. Laurie Locke	1995–1999
Rev. Anthony Shryane	1999–2019
Rev. David Finegan	2019-

== Parish statistics ==
The following table records the number of Baptisms (of children), Receptions (of adults) into the church, Marriages and the number attending Sunday Mass (as counted on the annual Census Sunday).

Year	Baptisms	Receptions	Marriages	Estimated RC Pop.	Mass Attendance
1960					
1965					
1970					
1975					
1980					
1985	19	4	12	750	223
1990	14	1	5	1000	240
1995	18	4	4	500	230
2000	11	0	4	1000	224
2005	23	3	2	1000	250
2010	17	0	8	1000	270
2015					

== Shrine of St Etheldreda ==
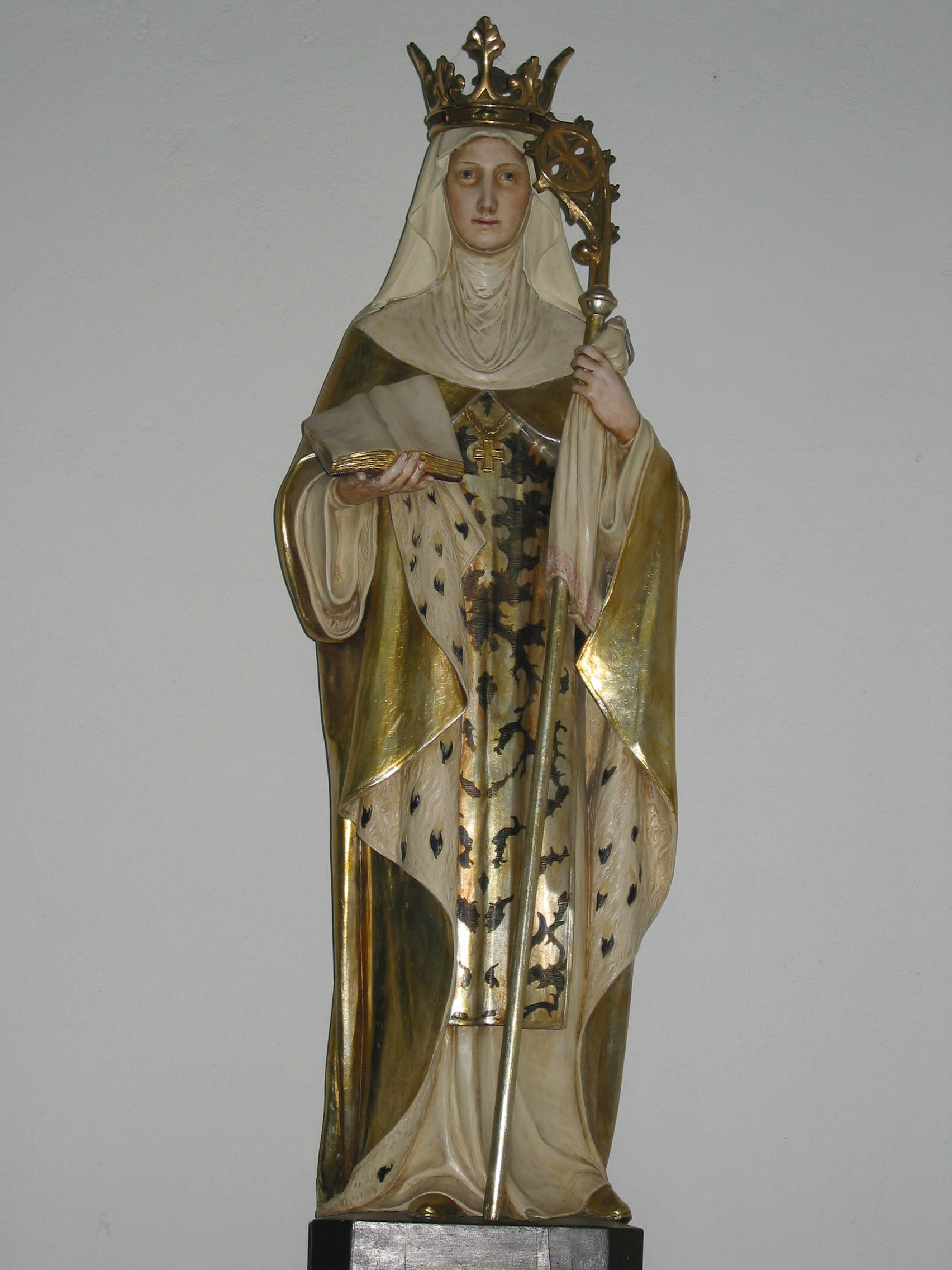
Statue of St Etheldreda as Abbess

The main modern shrine of St Etheldreda is located within the Church of St Etheldreda in Ely. In medieval England the principal shrine of St Etheldreda was at the Abbey of Ely. St Etheldreda was one of the most popular Anglo-Saxon saints and her shrine was one of the five most visited in medieval England. An analysis of Shrine offerings during the medieval period, for example, shows her shrine to be a major centre of pilgrimage until the 1520s.

At the heart of St Etheldreda's cult was that her body was found to be incorrupt, remaining whole and lifelike in the grave, rather than decomposing. This was recorded initially by Bede in Bk 4, chp 19 of the History of the English Church thus helping her cult to become established and well known from an early date.

During the medieval period the Abbeys or Cathedral churches of Durham, Glastonbury, Salisbury, Thetford, Waltham and York all claimed to have relics, or small parts of the body of St Etheldreda. It cannot now be confirmed whether these were authentic relics or not, but the nineteenth-century discovery of a relic, recorded below, supports the idea that relics of St Etheldreda may well have been distributed wider than the main shrine.

Besides the principal relic of the body of St Etheldreda, the cult of St Etheldreda seems to have also involved the distribution of lace necklaces and other objects which were claimed to have been associated with St Etheldreda. Records of the visitation of Dr Layton and Dr Leigh in 1536 make reference to cloths for women with sore throats and sore breasts, a comb of St Etheldreda for women with headaches and a ring of St Etheldreda for women seeking relief when 'lying-in' in childbirth.

At the English Reformation, in the sixteenth century, the shrine of St Etheldreda was destroyed and the cult ended. Fragments of the shrine are thought to have survived in various locations around the town of Ely. Painted panels with scenes from the Saint's life were found being used as a cupboard door in an Ely house in the 1780s. There is also a small eighth-century carved frieze found in a barn wall at St John's Farm near Ely, which is thought to come from the shrine. Parts of the canopy of Bishop Hotham's tomb, within the Cathedral of Ely, have also been claimed as parts of the shrine. The fact that so little of the original shrine survives is probably due to the fact that Prior Robert Wells and the 23 monks who signed the deed of surrender on 18 Nov 1539 seem to have been largely sympathetic to the ideas of the Reformation and so many of them took positions in the new church or drew pensions from the Crown.

The exact date of the destruction of the medieval shrine cannot be pinpointed with accuracy, but it probably took place following Thomas Goodrich's instruction to the clergy of Ely diocese on 21 October 1541, commanding that "all images, relicks, table monuments of miracles and shrines" should be demolished and obliterated. Reference to the actual destruction of the shrine was made by Dr John Caius (later to found Caius College, Cambridge) as he records his surprise at finding that it was built out of stone, not marble, as might have been expected. Nevertheless, official records show that some 361 ounces of gold and 5,040 ounces of gold and white plate were taken from the shrine into the royal treasury.

The modern relic of Saint Etheldreda, consisting of her left hand, was found preserved in a separate reliquary, hidden in a priest's hiding hole in a house in Sussex in about 1811. It was presented to the Duke of Norfolk and passed down to the community of Dominican Sisters at Stone. The hand was found on an engraved silver plate on which was written 'Manus Sanctae Etheldredae DCLXXIII.' The plate itself was of a tenth-century style, suggesting that the hand had been separated from the rest of St Etheldreda's body at around the time of the tenth century. It was reported in 1876 that when the hand was found it was "perfectly entire and quite white (but) exposure to the air has now changed it to a dark brown and the skin has cracked and disappeared in several places"

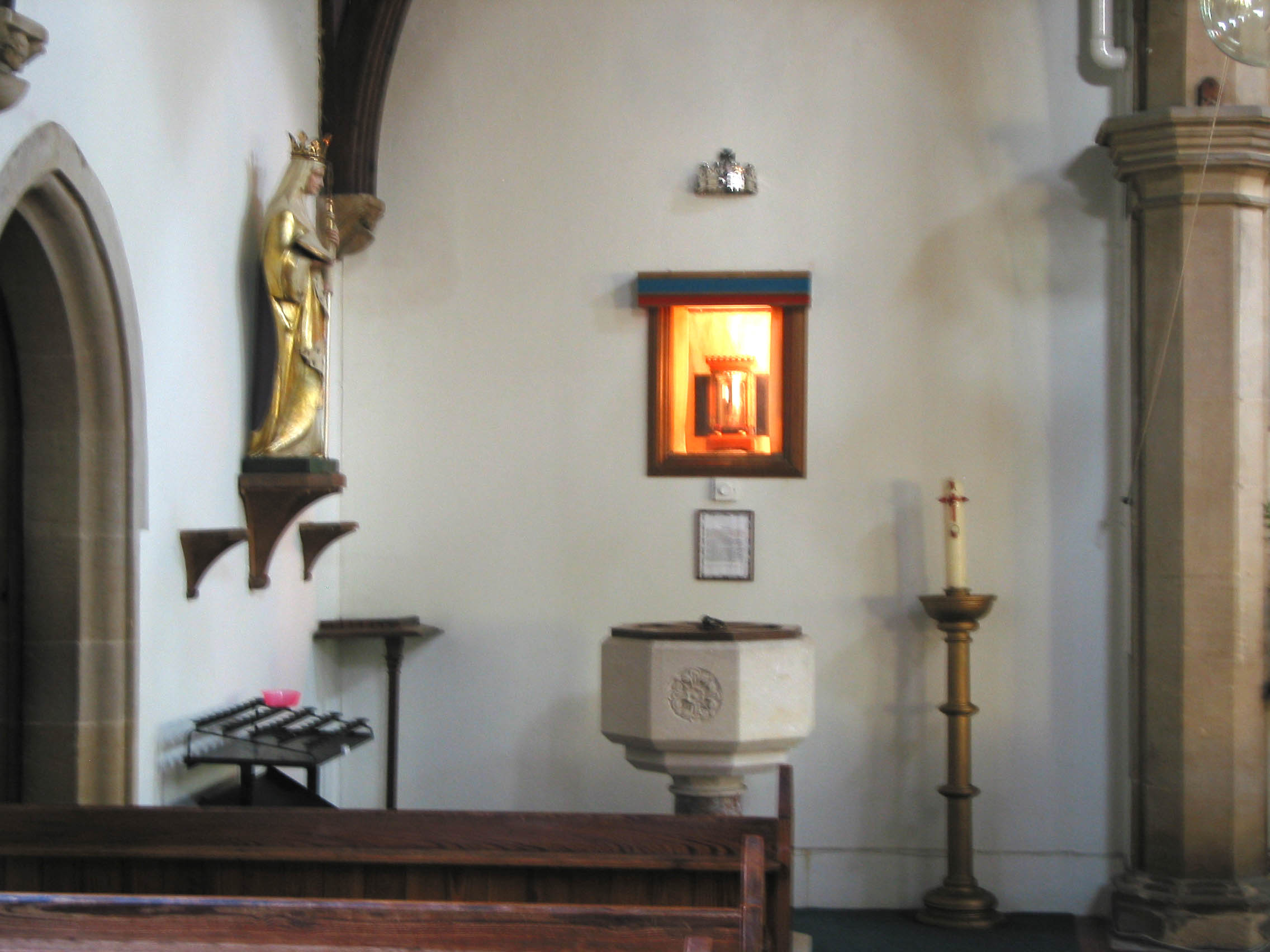
The shrine and relics of St Etheldreda (2012)

A small part of the hand of St Etheldreda was returned to the parish in 1950, given from St Etheldreda's Church in London where it had been honoured. But the main relic had remained with the Dominican sisters at Stone and they donated it to the parish in June 1953, where it has remained ever since.

The modern day shrine is a relatively simple construction, displaying St Etheldreda's hand in a glass reliquary. Until the late 1960s there was a small altar dedicated to St Etheldreda, immediately in front of where the relics are displayed, but the liturgical changes which followed the Second Vatican Council led to the altar being removed, to be replaced by the parish font in 1975, which was moved from the back of the church where it had previously been.

Pilgrims continue to visit the shrine of St Etheldreda at the small Roman Catholic church, often combining it with a visit to Ely Cathedral, where the medieval shrine was located before the Reformation.
