= Franklin Thomas =

Franklin Thomas may refer to:

- Franklin A. Thomas (1934–2021), president of the Ford Foundation, 1979–1996
- Franklin and David Thomas (both died 1995), convicted murderers who were executed by Saint Vincent and the Grenadines

== See also ==
- Frank Thomas (disambiguation)
