= Thomas Francis =

Thomas Francis may refer to:

- Thomas Francis (politician), English Member of Parliament for Colchester, 1386–1413
- Thomas Francis (English physician) (died 1574), English physician, President of the Royal College of Physicians
- Thomas Francis, Prince of Carignano (1596–1656), Italian general
- Thomas Willing Francis (1767–1815), American merchant
- Thomas Francis Jr. (1900–1969), American physician, virologist, and epidemiologist
- Thomas Francis (cricketer) (1902–1969), South African cricketer
- Tomas Francis (born 1992), Welsh rugby union player

== See also ==
- Francis Thomas (disambiguation)
