= Francis Amherst =

English Bishop

Francis Kerril Amherst
- Bishop of Northampton
- Diocese: Northampton
- See: Northampton
- Installed: 4 July 1858
- Term ended: September 1878
- Predecessor: William Wareing
- Successor: Arthur Riddell.

Orders
- Ordination: 6 June 1846 by Nicholas Wiseman
- Consecration: 4 July 1858. by Nicholas Wiseman, William Bernard Ullathorne, and William Vaughan

Personal details
- Born: 21 March 1819 London, United Kingdom
- Died: 21 August 1883 (aged 64)
- Buried: The Cathedral Church of St Mary and St Thomas, Northampton
- Denomination: Roman Catholic
- Parents: William Kerril and Mary Louisa Turville-Fortescue Amherst
- Education: St. Mary's College, Oscott

Francis Kerril Amherst T.O.S.D., (21 March 1819, London – 21 August 1883) was an English Bishop of the Roman Catholic Diocese of Northampton in England.

== Life ==
Francis Amherst was born in Marylebone, London 21 March 1819. He was the eldest son of William Kerril Amherst, of Little Parndon, Essex, and of Mary Louisa Turville-Fortescue, of Bosworth Hall, Leicestershire. One or both of his parents hailed from recusant families. One of his sisters became a Benedictine nun, another joined the order of Providence. His brother William joined the Jesuits.

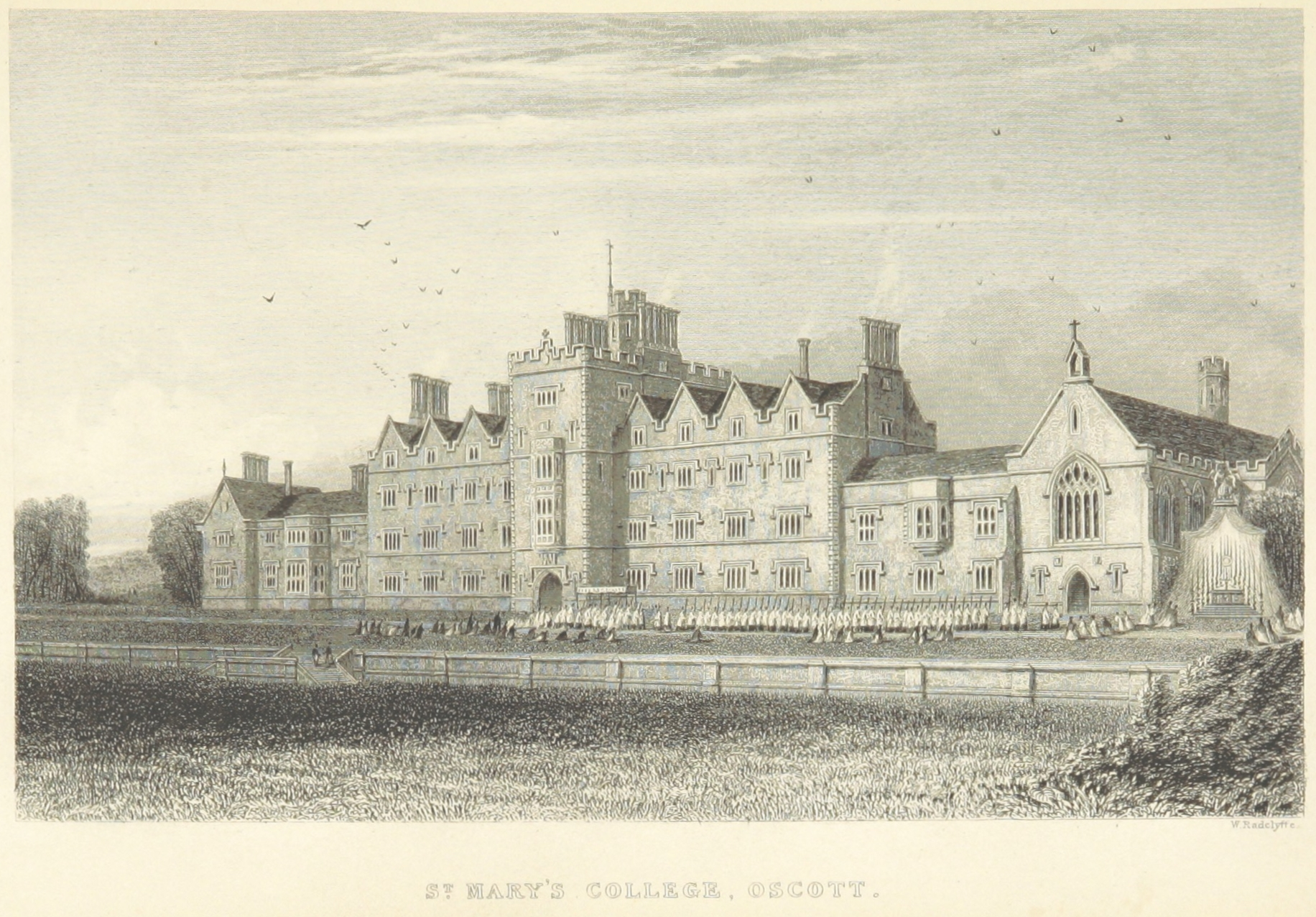
St Mary's College, Oscott (1839)

Amherst was sent to study at Oscott College in 1830 with the intention of preparing for the Catholic priesthood, but after completing his studies, he left St. Mary's to study engineering in Belgium. He returned to Oscott, however, in 1841, to do theological studies. Nicholas Wiseman was the president of the college, and the following year Amherst accompanied Bishop Wiseman on a trip to Rome. He was ordained a priest by Wiseman on 6 June 1846. In 1853, he joined the Dominicans at Woodchester, but left the following year due to poor health. He returned to Oscott as a professor.

After eleven months, Amherst was appointed to the mission of Stafford. After the resignation of Bishop William Wareing of Northampton, he was named by the Holy See to head that diocese. Despite his protest, he was consecrated 4 July 1858. At Northampton, Amherst found himself fairly isolated, except when making visitations. In 1862 he was honored with an appointment as an Assistant at the Pontifical Throne.

In 1869 he attended the First Vatican Council with Dr. Errington and William Clifford, Bishop of Clifton. The intense heat in Rome caused him to leave early. On his way north he stopped to view the Oberammergau Passion Play. He resigned his see in 1879, owing to ill health, and the following year was given the Titular See of Sozusa.

In September 1878, Amherst resigned the see due to failing health, and was succeeded by Arthur Riddell. Toward the end of 1882, he lost his sight, which was a great trial as he loved reading and observing nature. Amherst died at his residence, Fieldgate, Kenilworth, Warwickshire, on 21 August 1883, aged 64, and was buried in The Cathedral Church of St Mary and St Thomas.

Religious titles
Preceded by William Wareing	Bishop of Northampton; 1858–1878	Succeeded by Arthur George Riddell
