= Laurence Youens =

Laurence Walter Youens (14 December 1873 – 14 November 1939) was an English prelate of the Roman Catholic Church. He served as the Bishop of Northampton from 1933 to 1939.

Born in High Wycombe, Buckinghamshire, on 14 December 1873, he was received into the Catholic Church in 1890. He was ordained to the priesthood on 30 June 1901. He was appointed the Bishop of the Diocese of Northampton by the Holy See on 16 June 1933. His consecration to the Episcopate took place on 25 July 1933. The principal consecrator was Thomas Williams, Archbishop of Birmingham, and the principal co-consecrators were John McNulty, Bishop of Nottingham, and Joseph Butt, Auxiliary Bishop of Westminster.

He died in office on 14 November 1939, aged 65, and was buried at Belmont Abbey, Herefordshire.

Catholic Church titles
Preceded by Dudley Charles Cary-Elwes	Bishop of Northampton; 1933–1939	Succeeded by Thomas Leo Parker
