= David Oakley (bishop) =

English priest (born 1955)

The Right Reverend David Oakley
- Bishop of Northampton
- Church: Roman Catholic Church
- Province: Westminster
- Diocese: Northampton
- Appointed: 8 January 2020
- Installed: 19 March 2020
- Predecessor: Peter Doyle
- Previous post: Rector of St Mary's College, Oscott (2013–2020)

Orders
- Ordination: 5 July 1980 by George Patrick Dwyer
- Consecration: 19 March 2020 by Vincent Nichols

Personal details
- Born: David James Oakley; 28 November 1955 (age 70) Stourbridge, England
- Denomination: Roman Catholic
- Motto: Beati Pauperes Spiritu
- Coat of arms

David James Oakley (born 28 November 1955) is a British Catholic prelate who has served as Bishop of Northampton since 2020. He is currently on a leave of absence as he awaits trial for the alleged rape of a child.

== Early life and education ==
Oakley was born in Stourbridge on 28 November 1955. From 1974 to 1980, he trained for Holy Orders at St Mary's College, Oscott.

== Ordained ministry ==
He was ordained as a priest on 5 July 1980 for the Archdiocese of Birmingham. From February 2013 to 2020, he served as Rector of St Mary's College, Oscott, the seminary of the Archdiocese of Birmingham.

He was appointed the Bishop of the Diocese of Northampton by the Holy See on 8 January 2020. His consecration to the episcopate took place at Northampton Cathedral on 19 March 2020; the principal consecrator was Cardinal Vincent Nichols, Archbishop of Westminster.

He is an episcopal advisor for the Catholic Charismatic Renewal in England and Wales.

== Arrest ==
In October 2025 it was announced that Oakley was taking a leave of absence from his duties for "personal reasons". In June 2026, he was charged with two counts of rape against a female under the age of 16, having been first arrested in September 2025. On 30 June 2026 it was announced that Pope Leo XIV had appointed Richard Moth, the Archbishop of Westminster, as apostolic administrator of the Northampton Diocese in Oakley's absence.

Catholic Church titles
Preceded by Peter Doyle	Roman Catholic Bishop of Northampton; 2020–present	Incumbent
