= Thomas Becket Catholic School =

Location
- Becket Way; Northampton, Northamptonshire, NN3 6HT; England; 52.2701°N 0.8619°W

Information
- Type: Academy
- Motto: Christ's Love is Our Foundation
- Religious affiliation: Roman Catholic
- Trust: OLICAT
- Department for Education URN: 142747 Tables
- Ofsted: Reports
- Chair: Chris Atkin
- Headteacher: Paul McCahill
- Gender: Mixed
- Age: 11 to 18
- Enrolment: 840
- Houses: Carlos, More and Teresa
- Website: www.thomasbecket.org.uk

Thomas Becket Catholic School is a mixed secondary school and sixth form located in Northampton, United Kingdom.

== History ==
The school was founded as Thomas Becket Roman Catholic Upper School; under construction through 1974 and 1975, it had opened by March 1976. It was named after Thomas Becket, 12th-century Archbishop of Canterbury. After Northamptonshire County Council, the local education authority, reverted from the three-tier system (13+ entry age) to the two-tier system (11+ entry), the school was renamed to Thomas Becket Catholic School.

In 2004, following the reversion to the two-tier system and the resulting increase in student numbers, students in Years 7 and 8 had to be located in temporary classrooms on the tennis courts because of the insufficient room in the main building. The school authorities unsuccessfully applied to demolish and rebuild the school. The subsequent application to refurbish and extend the school, however, was accepted. Upon the completion of the refurbishment, the school revealed plans to include a bar in the proposed £2 million sports complex which would have included half-a-dozen artificial turf pitches, a full sized pitch and state-of-the art floodlights, sparking controversy among local residents. Following co-ordinated action by local residents, the planning permission application was withdrawn by the sponsor PlayFootball at the end of 2008.

In September 2008, Thomas Becket Catholic School became a Specialist Sports College. The Specialist Schools Programme ended in 2010 after a change in the national government.

Previously a voluntary aided school administered by Northamptonshire County Council, in April 2016 Thomas Becket Catholic School converted to an academy under the St Thomas of Canterbury Catholic Academies Trust, which via mergers became Our Lady Immaculate Catholic Academies Trust (OLICAT), a multi-academy trust that also runs other Catholic schools in Northamptonshire and Bedfordshire. The school continues to be under the guidance of the Roman Catholic Diocese of Northampton.

As of 2016, Thomas Becket Catholic School is the only Catholic secondary school in the county.

== Education ==
Most students usually take ten subjects for GCSE, alongside Entry Level Physical Education and PHSE. All pupils must take English (Language and Literature), Double Science, Mathematics, Information Technology, Religious Studies and three other subjects of their choice. A-Level students not taking Religious Studies for A-Level have to take a Level 1 course in it.

The school's KS3 SATs results were over local and national averages in 2007. Its GCSE performance trend rose above local and national averages to 52% in 2002 before falling to 42% in 2003. In 2008, the pass rate in A-Level results rose from 75% to 91%, with a rise from 34.8% to 41% in the proportion of students getting grades A-C, and the proportion of students getting grades A*-C at GCSE level rose to 48.35%, an increase of 11%, with a 5% increase to 34.62% in Maths and English.

== See also ==
- Northampton School for Boys – the county's boys-only state school
- Northampton School for Girls – the county's girls-only state school
