= Kevin McDonald (bishop) =

Catholic archbishop (born 1947)

The Most Reverend Kevin McDonald
- Archbishop Emeritus of Southwark
- Archdiocese: Southwark
- Province: Southwark
- See: Southwark
- Appointed: 6 November 2003
- Installed: 8 December 2003
- Term ended: 4 December 2009
- Predecessor: Michael George Bowen
- Successor: Peter Smith
- Previous post: Bishop of Northampton (2001–2003)

Orders
- Ordination: 20 July 1974
- Consecration: 2 May 2001 by Patrick Leo McCartie

Personal details
- Born: Kevin John Patrick McDonald; 18 August 1947 (age 79) Stoke-on-Trent, England
- Denomination: Roman Catholic

Styles of Kevin McDonald
- Reference style: The Most Reverend
- Spoken style: Your Grace
- Religious style: Archbishop

Kevin John Patrick McDonald KC*HS (born 18 August 1947, Stoke-on-Trent) is the Archbishop Emeritus of the Roman Catholic Archdiocese of Southwark, England.

== Life ==
Born in Stoke-on-Trent, from 1958 to 1965 McDonald attended the Christian Brothers' Grammar School there, St. Joseph's College, Stoke-on-Trent. He read Latin at Birmingham University from 1965 to 1968.

In 1968, he was accepted as a student for the Archdiocese of Birmingham and was ordained priest on 20 July 1974 in the Metropolitan Cathedral of St Chad in Birmingham. From 1976 to 1985, he was a lecturer in moral theology at Oscott College. He became secretary at the Pontifical Council for Promoting Christian Unity in Rome from 1985 to 1993. McDonald earned a Doctorate of Sacred Theology from the Pontifical University of Saint Thomas Aquinas, Angelicum in 1989 with a dissertation titled Communion and friendship: a framework for ecumenical dialogue in ethics.

In 1993, he returned to England and became the Parish priest of English Martyrs, Sparkhill until 1998. It was while in Sparkhill that McDonald developed his interest in inter-religious dialogue. From 1998 until 2001, he was Rector of Oscott seminary. McDonald was consecrated the 11th Bishop of Northampton on 2 May 2001 by Bishop Leo McCartie, assisted by Archbishops Patrick Kelly and Vincent Nichols.

== Archbishop of Southwark ==
On 8 December 2003, McDonald was installed as the Archbishop of Southwark on the feast of the Immaculate Conception, the patronal feast of the archdiocese. After becoming archbishop, McDonald suffered with ill health, spending a significant portion of 2008 on sick leave. Besides suffering from severe osteoarthritis, he underwent a triple heart bypass. He was rumoured to be Pope Benedict XVI's first choice to replace Cormac Murphy-O'Connor as Archbishop of Westminster. However, on 4 December 2009, McDonald resigned his post on health grounds.

== Personal ==
He has an elder brother and sister and two younger brothers. He has nine nephews and nieces and three great-nephews.

Catholic Church titles
Preceded by Patrick Leo McCartie	Bishop of Northampton; 2001–2003	Succeeded by Peter John Haworth Doyle
Preceded by Michael George Bowen	Archbishop of Southwark; 2003–2009	Succeeded by Peter Smith
