= Diocese of Northampton =

Catholic diocese in England

Coordinates: 52.2481°N 0.8985°W

Diocese of Northampton Dioecesis Northantoniensis

Catholic
- Logo of the diocese

Location
- Country: England
- Territory: Bedfordshire; Buckinghamshire; Northamptonshire (without Peterborough)
- Ecclesiastical province: Westminster
- Metropolitan: Westminster

Statistics
- Area: 3,419 km^{2} (1,320 sq mi)
- Population: Total; Catholics: (as of 2013); 2,089,307; 182,500 (8.7%)
- Parishes: 70

Information
- Denomination: Roman Catholic
- Rite: Latin Rite
- Established: 29 September 1850
- Cathedral: Northampton Cathedral
- Secular priests: 92

Current leadership
- Pope: Leo XIV
- Bishop: David James Oakley
- Metropolitan Archbishop: Richard Moth
- Apostolic Administrator: Richard Moth (sede plena et ad nutum Sanctae Sedis)
- Vicar General: Michael Harrison
- Bishops emeritus: Peter John Haworth Doyle

Map
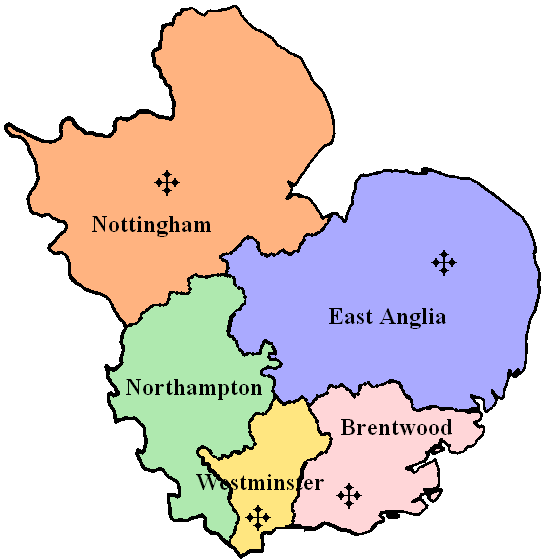
- Diocese of Northampton within the Province of Westminster

Website
- northamptondiocese.org

The Diocese of Northampton (Latin: Dioecesis Northantoniensis) is a Latin Church diocese of the Catholic church in England and Wales and suffragan of Westminster. Its see is in Northampton. The Cathedral of Our Lady Immaculate and St Thomas of Canterbury is the mother church of the Diocese.

== Location ==
The diocese now covers the counties of Bedfordshire, Northamptonshire and Buckinghamshire under their pre-1974 historic boundaries. Until 1976, the counties of Cambridgeshire, Norfolk and Suffolk were also included; since then they have formed the Diocese of East Anglia.

== History ==
When Augustine of Canterbury came from Rome in 597 he concentrated on the areas of Kent and Essex, but thirty years later the area that the Northampton Diocese covers finally received the Christian message, with the arrival of the missionary Birinus and the foundation of his see at Dorchester-on-Thames in 636. Nevertheless, the real evangelisation of the people who dwelt in the diocese was achieved through the labours and missionaries of the isle of Lindisfarne, off the Northumbrian coast. Notable amongst them was Chad of Mercia, whose see, established at Lichfield in 669, included the present diocese of Northampton.

From the time of the Reformation until 1850, Catholic dioceses ceased to exist in Britain. However, in 1688 England was divided into four Apostolic vicariates, with Northampton under the authority of the Vicar Apostolic of the Midland District. In 1840, the Apostolic Vicariate of the Eastern District was created out of the Midland District. On the restoration of the Catholic hierarchy in England and Wales by Pope Pius IX on 29 September 1850, most of the Eastern District became the Diocese of Northampton. Its first bishop was William Wareing, previously Vicar Apostolic of the Eastern District.

On 13 March 1976, by decree Quod Ecumenicum, Pope Paul VI formed the Diocese of East Anglia for the counties of Cambridgeshire, Norfolk and Suffolk by detaching these counties from the Diocese of Northampton.

== Diocesan coat of arms ==
The motto under the shield translates as 'Beneath Thy Protection'. On the shield are lilies and choughs, which are symbols of the two patrons of the diocese, and of the cathedral, Blessed Virgin Mary and Thomas of Canterbury.

== Bishops ==
Bishop Patrick Leo McCartie was a bishop emeritus of Northampton, having retired on 29 March 2001 after serving the diocese for 11 years. He was succeeded by bishop Kevin John Patrick McDonald, who went on to be appointed Archbishop of Southwark on 6 November 2003. Bishop McCartie died on 22 April 2020.

The next Bishop of Northampton was Peter John Haworth Doyle, born on 3 May 1944 at Wilpshire, near Blackburn in Lancashire. He retired on 8 January 2020, with David James Oakley being appointed at that time as successor.

=== Ordinaries ===
- William Wareing (appointed Vicar Apostolic of the Eastern District on 5 June 1840, elevated Bishop of Northampton on 29 September 1850 – resigned on 21 December 1858)
- Francis Kerril Amherst (appointed on 14 May 1858 – resigned 16 October 1879)
- Arthur George Riddell (appointed on 27 April 1880 – died in office on 15 September 1907)
- Frederick William Keating (appointed on 5 February 1908 – translated to the Archdiocese of Liverpool on 13 June 1921)
- Dudley Charles Cary-Elwes (appointed on 21 November 1921 – died in office on 1 May 1932)
- Laurence William Youens (appointed on 16 June 1933 – died in office on 14 November 1939)
- Thomas Leo Parker (appointed on 14 December 1940 – retired 17 January 1967)
- Charles Alexander Grant (appointed on 14 March 1967 – retired 16 February 1982)
- Francis Gerard Thomas (appointed on 27 August 1982 – died in office on 25 December 1988)
- Patrick Leo McCartie (appointed on 20 February 1990 – retired 29 March 2001)
- Kevin John Patrick McDonald (appointed on 29 March 2001 – translated to the Archdiocese of Southwark on 6 November 2003)
- Peter John Haworth Doyle (appointed on 24 May 2005 – retired on 8 January 2020)
- David James Oakley (appointed on 8 January 2020 – present)

=== Auxiliary bishops ===
- Alan Charles Clark (1969-1976), appointed Bishop of East Anglia
- Charles Alexander Grant (1961-1967), appointed Bishop of Northampton

=== Other priest of this diocese who became bishop ===
- Joseph Edward Rudderham, appointed Bishop of Clifton in 1949

== Statistics ==
The estimated Catholic population of the diocese in 2004 was 173,539 while the total population in the diocesan territory was 2,000,769. The diocese covers a territory of 5,532 km² and has 68 parishes.

== Secondary Schools ==
Catholic secondary schools located within the diocese include:

- St Bernard's Catholic Grammar School, Slough
- St Michael's Catholic School, High Wycombe
- St Thomas More Catholic School, Bedford
- Thomas Becket Catholic School, Northampton
- Thornton College, near Buckingham

== Pilgrimage ==
The Northampton Diocese makes up part of the Catholic Association Pilgrimage.

== Shrines ==
The Diocese of Northampton has two official shrines. In 2006, Our Lady of Perpetual Succour Church, Great Billing was made a diocesan shrine. On 29 September 2012, Bishop Peter Doyle made the Church of the Holy Child and St Joseph in Bedford a shrine to Our Lady of Guadalupe, after a receiving the image from the Archbishop of Westminster Vincent Nichols.

== See also ==
- Catholic Church in England and Wales
- List of Catholic churches in the United Kingdom
