= Patrick Leo McCartie =

British Catholic bishop (1925–2020)

The Right Reverend Patrick Leo McCartie
- Bishop of Northampton
- Province: Westminster
- Diocese: Northampton
- See: Northampton
- Appointed: 20 February 1990
- Installed: 20 February 1990
- Term ended: 29 March 2001
- Predecessor: Francis Gerard Thomas
- Successor: Kevin John Patrick McDonald
- Previous posts: Titular Bishop of Elmhama (1977–1990); Auxiliary Bishop of Birmingham (1977–1990)

Orders
- Ordination: 17 July 1949
- Consecration: 20 May 1977 by George Patrick Dwyer

Personal details
- Born: 5 September 1925 West Hartlepool, England
- Died: 23 April 2020 (aged 94) Harborne, Birmingham, England, United Kingdom of Great Britain and Northern Ireland
- Denomination: Roman Catholic

Patrick Leo McCartie (5 September 1925 – 23 April 2020) was a British Catholic prelate who was the Auxiliary Bishop of the Roman Catholic Archdiocese of Birmingham and Bishop of Northampton.

== Life ==
McCartie was born in West Hartlepool in September 1925, the son of Patrick Leo and Hannah McCartie. After seminary studies at Oscott College, Birmingham, McCartie was ordained as a priest on 17 July 1949, aged 23 for service in the Archdiocese of Birmingham.

After a year's curacy at St Chad's Cathedral, he was on the staff of Cotton College (1950–55), followed by his appointment as the Parish Priest of St Mary's, Wednesbury. He was Director of Religious Education for the Diocese (1963-8) and Administrator (equivalent to Cathedral Dean) of the Metropolitan Cathedral of St Chad in Birmingham (1968–77).

On 13 April 1977 McCartie was appointed Auxiliary Bishop of Birmingham and Titular Bishop of Elmhama by Pope Paul VI. He received his episcopal consecration on the following 20 May from Archbishop George Patrick Dwyer, with Bishops Joseph Gray and Joseph Francis Cleary serving as co-consecrators.

On 20 February 1990 McCartie was appointed the tenth Bishop of Northampton by Pope John Paul II. He was President of the Catholic Commission for Racial Justice (1978–83). On 29 March 2001 his resignation was accepted by the Pope, having reached the mandatory retirement age of 75.

He celebrated the Diamond Jubilee of his ordination in July 2009, at Aston with his colleagues and at Nottingham with a celebratory Diocesan Mass. He listed his recreations in Who's Who as walking and music. He died in April 2020 at the age of 94.

Catholic Church titles
Preceded by Francis Gerard Thomas	Bishop of Northampton; 1990–2001	Succeeded by Kevin John Patrick McDonald
