= Leo Parker (bishop) =

Thomas Leo Parker (21 December 1887 – 25 March 1975) was an English prelate of the Roman Catholic Church. He served as the Bishop of Northampton from 1940 to 1967.

Born in Sutton Coldfield on 21 December 1887, he was ordained to the priesthood for the Diocese of Salford on 29 May 1915. He subsequently served as Private Secretary to Bishop Louis Charles Casartelli and later Bishop Thomas Henshaw. In 1936 Parker was elevated to Monsignor and appointed Parish Priest at St Thomas of Canterbury, Higher Broughton, where he served for the next four years.

He was appointed the Bishop of the Diocese of Northampton by the Holy See on 14 December 1940. His consecration to the Episcopate took place on 11 February 1941. The principal consecrator was Archbishop William Godfrey, Apostolic Delegate to Great Britain (later Archbishop of Liverpool, then of Westminster), and the principal co-consecrators were Bishop Peter Amigo of Southwark and Bishop John McNulty of Nottingham. He participated in all the four sessions of the Second Vatican Council, held between in 1962 and 1965.

He retired as Bishop of Northampton on 17 January 1967. On the same day he was appointed Titular Bishop of Magarmel, but resigned the title on 7 December 1970. He died as Bishop Emeritus of Northampton on 25 March 1975, aged 87, and was buried at Northampton Cathedral.

Catholic Church titles
Preceded by Laurence William Youens	Bishop of Northampton; 1940–1967	Succeeded by Charles Alexander Grant
