= Thomas Frank =

Thomas (or Tommy or Tom) Frank may refer to:

- Thomas Frank (political commentator) (born 1965), American political analyst, and historian
- Thomas Frank (priest) (died 1731), English priest
- Thomas Peirson Frank (1881–1951), British civil engineer and surveyor
- Thomas Frank (football manager) (born 1973), Danish football manager
- Thomas Hilbourne Frank (born 1932), politician from Antigua and Barbuda
- Tommy Frank (born 1993), British boxer

== See also ==
- Frank Thomas (disambiguation)
- Thomas Franck (disambiguation)
- Thomas Franke (born 1988), German footballer
