= Michael Coveney =

British theatre critic (born 1948)

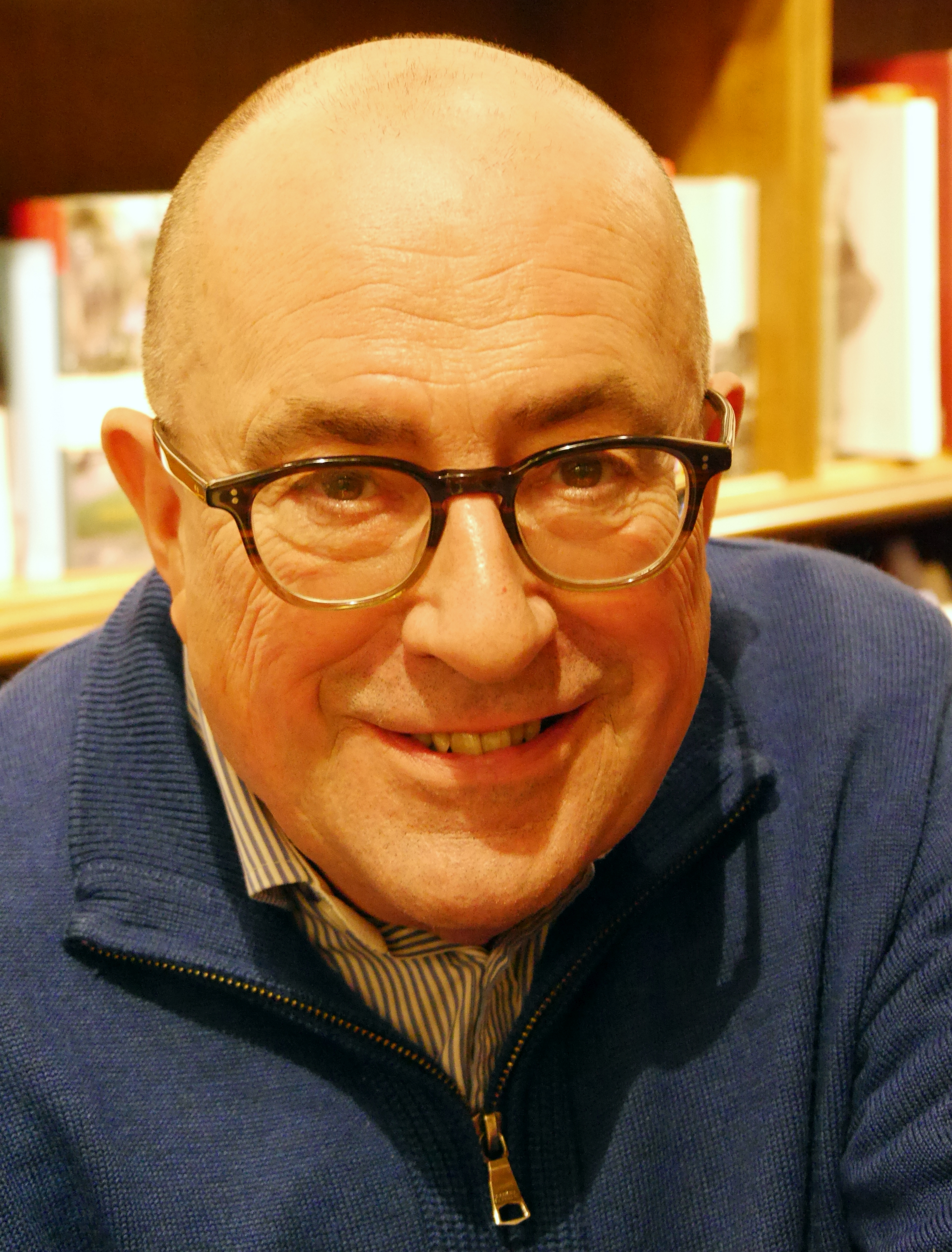
- Coveney, Hatchards, London, 2022
- Born: 24 July 1948 (age 78); London, England
- Education: Worcester College, Oxford
- Occupation: Theatre critic

Michael Coveney (born 24 July 1948) is a British theatre critic. Beginning his career in the 1970s, he has been associated with publications including the Financial Times, Plays and Players, The Observer and the Daily Mail. He is also an author of books that include biographies of Maggie Smith and Andrew Lloyd Webber.

== Education and career ==
Coveney was born in London, England, and educated at St Ignatius' College in Stamford Hill, and Worcester College, Oxford. After graduation, he worked as a script reader for the Royal Court Theatre and from 1972 he contributed theatre reviews to the Financial Times. He was deputy editor (1973–75) and editor (1975–78) of Plays and Players magazine and theatre critic and deputy arts editor of the Financial Times throughout the 1980s.

He was theatre critic for The Observer from 1990 until he joined the Daily Mail in 1997, following the death of Jack Tinker. He remained at the Daily Mail until 2004. He was chief critic of the theatre website WhatsOnStage.com until retiring from the role in 2016.

He is the author of The Citz, a history of the Citizens Theatre (Nick Hern Books, 1990), and Maggie Smith: A Bright Particular Star (Victor Gollancz Ltd, 1993).

His book The Aisle Is Full of Noises (Nick Hern Books, 1994), a diary of a year in the theatre, was withdrawn following complaints of potential libel from Milton Shulman; although, as reported in The Times of 21 September 1994, Coveney "thought the comments were in the spirit of the book. I rather regret that Milton, of whom I am actually rather fond, didn't take them in that spirit." Most copies of the book had been sold before its withdrawal. In 2011, he published a biography of Ken Campbell, The Great Caper.

Coveney has also published a biography of Andrew Lloyd Webber, and a revised edition of his biography of Maggie Smith was published in 2015.

Coveney has said that his influences as a critic are Kenneth Tynan, Michael Billington, Harold Clurman, George Jean Nathan and Stark Young.

== Selected publications ==
- Coveney, Michael, The World According to Mike Leigh (paperback edition, London: HarperCollins Publishers, 1997; originally published: London: HarperCollins Publishers, 1996), Includes a "Preface to the Paperback Edition", pp. xvii–xxiv.
