= Brian Hanrahan =

British TV journalist (1949-2010)

- Born: 22 March 1949; Edmonton, England
- Died: 20 December 2010 (aged 61); Edmonton, England
- Occupations: Journalist, television presenter
- Years active: 1969–2010
- Notable credit(s): BBC News; Falklands War
- Spouse: Honor Wilson (m. 1986)
- Children: 1

Brian Hanrahan (22 March 1949 – 20 December 2010) was a British television journalist who was the Diplomatic News Editor for the British Broadcasting Corporation (BBC).

== Early life ==
Hanrahan was born at the North Middlesex County Hospital, Edmonton, England, on 22 March 1949, the son of a construction worker. He was educated at St Ignatius' College, Stamford Hill, in Tottenham, and subsequently studied Politics at the University of Essex, where he was a member of an amateur dramatic society.

== Journalism career ==
In 1970, Hanrahan joined the BBC as a photographic stills clerk. He was one of the six news trainees appointed by the BBC in 1971, and went on to become a news scriptwriter with the organisation, and then a Duty Editor in the BBC Television Newsroom. He worked for a spell as the BBC's Northern Ireland correspondent, during which time he reported on The Troubles.

=== Falklands War ===
As a BBC war correspondent Hanrahan joined the press corps attached to the Task Force dispatched by the Government of the United Kingdom to counter the Argentine invasion of the Falkland Islands in 1982. One report filed by Hanrahan whilst travelling with the Task Force southwards through the Atlantic Ocean aboard the Royal Navy aircraft carrier HMS Hermes was particularly notable. He was reporting on an early air strike by Harrier jump jets operating from Hermes, when, to work a way around reporting restrictions regarding disclosure of classified military information, he stated "I'm not allowed to say how many planes joined the raid, but I counted them all out, and I counted them all back." The phrase later inspired the title of a book about conflict that he co-authored.

Hanrahan later went ashore on East Falkland during the land campaign, and reported from amidst British Armed Forces units in the frontline whilst under fire, and was present at the liberation of Port Stanley by them on 14 June 1982, which ended the war.

=== Foreign correspondent ===
During the mid-1980s he was a BBC correspondent in Hong Kong reporting on the negotiation by the British Government for transferring the governance of the territory to China. He later visited Moscow, reporting on the end of the Soviet Union in 1989.

== Death ==
Hanrahan died on 20 December 2010, aged 61, of pneumonia secondary to cancer, at the same hospital in Edmonton where he had been born.

Martin Bell wrote of him in an obituary published in The Guardian: "In the world of television news, where inflated egos are not unknown, Brian Hanrahan stood out for his modesty as well as his way with words."

== Publications ==
- with Fox, Robert (1982). I counted them all out and I counted them all back" : the battle for the Falklands. London: British Broadcasting Corp. ISBN 978-0-563-20147-2.
