= Charles Grant (bishop) =

Catholic bishop in England (1906–1989)

Charles Alexander Grant (25 October 1906 – 24 April 1989) was an English prelate of the Roman Catholic Church. He served as the Bishop of Northampton from 1967 to 1982.

Born in Cambridge on 25 October 1906, he was received into the Catholic Church in 1921. He was ordained to the priesthood on 16 June 1935. He was a parish priest in Ely from 1943–1945.

On 6 February 1961, Grant was appointed Auxiliary Bishop of Northampton and Titular Bishop of Alinda by Pope John XXIII. He received his episcopal consecration on the following 25 April from Bishop Thomas Parker of Northampton, with Bishops Joseph Rudderham of Clifton and John Petit of Menevia serving as co-consecrators. Grant participated in all the four sessions of the Second Vatican Council, held between in 1962 and 1965. He was appointed the Bishop of the Diocese of Northampton by the Holy See on 14 March 1967.

He retired on 16 February 1982 and assumed the title Bishop Emeritus of Northampton. He died on 24 April 1989, aged 82, and was buried at Woburn Sands, Buckinghamshire.

Catholic Church titles
Preceded by Thomas Leo Parker	Bishop of Northampton; 1967–1982	Succeeded by Francis Gerard Thomas
