= Northampton Cathedral =

Coordinates: 52.248°N 0.8985°W

- Cathedral Church of Our Lady Immaculate and St Thomas of Canterbury, Northampton
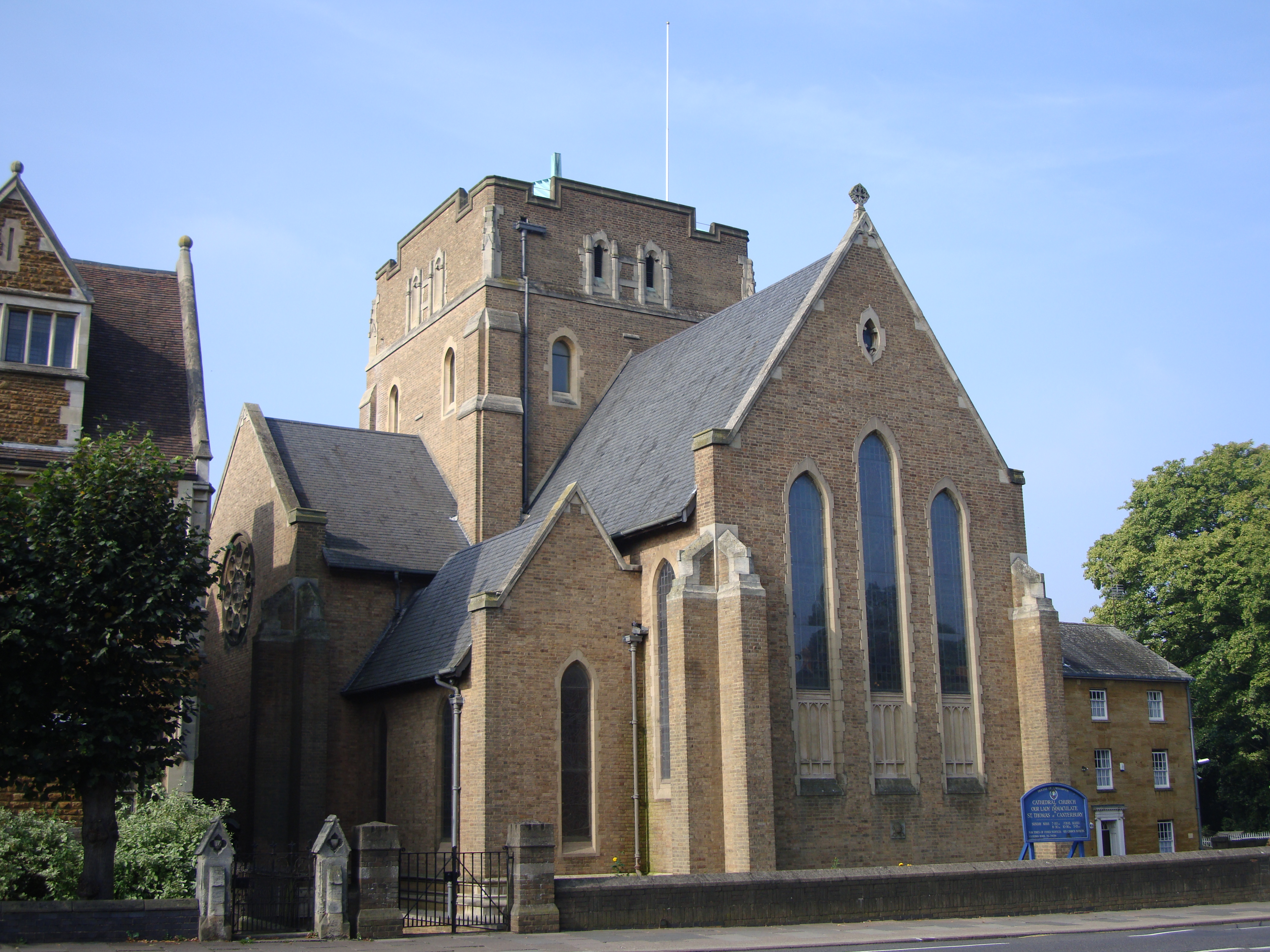
- The east end of the cathedral, built 1948-55

- Shown within Northamptonshire
- OS grid reference: SP7529061672
- Location: Northampton, Northamptonshire
- Country: England
- Denomination: Roman Catholic
- Website: www.northamptoncathedral.org

History
- Former name: Chapel of St Felix
- Status: Active
- Dedication: Our Lady Immaculate and St Thomas of Canterbury
- Consecrated: 1864

Architecture
- Functional status: Cathedral
- Heritage designation: Grade II
- Designated: 22 January 1976
- Architect: Augustus Welby Northmore Pugin
- Architectural type: Gothic Revival
- Groundbreaking: 1840

Administration
- Province: Westminster
- Diocese: Northampton

Clergy
- Bishop: David Oakley
- Dean: Simon Penhalagan

The Cathedral Church of St Mary and St Thomas is a Roman Catholic cathedral in Northampton, England. It is the seat of the Bishop of Northampton and mother church of the Diocese of Northampton which covers the counties of Northamptonshire, Bedfordshire, Buckinghamshire and part of Berkshire (formerly in Buckinghamshire) north of the River Thames. The cathedral is situated in the north of the town, along the Barrack Road.

== History ==
=== Foundation ===
In 1823, Bishop John Milner, Vicar Apostolic of the Midland District, sent Fr William Foley to Northampton to establish a permanent Roman Catholic presence in the town. His first base was a small house, used by a Catholic priest during the previous two years, which had one room as a chapel. Fr Foley bought a piece of land on the site of the original St Andrew's Priory, Northampton, whence Thomas Becket had gone into exile. It was there that Foley decided to have a purpose-built chapel constructed; the chapel, dedicated to Saint Andrew, was opened on 25 October 1825.

=== Building ===
The origins of the current building date back to 1840 when the first Bishop of Northampton, William Wareing, commissioned Augustus Welby Northmore Pugin to design a collegiate chapel of St Felix. The chapel of St Andrew was too small for the larger congregation. The new chapel was built in 1844. The number of worshippers soon outgrew the size of the building and Pugin's son Edward Welby Pugin was chosen by Bishop Wareing's successor, Francis Amherst to design an extension in order to make the building into a cathedral. This extension came in the form of the current nave which was opened in 1864, dedicated to Our Lady Immaculate and St Thomas of Canterbury. Dating from the 1860s, the stained glass windows were made by John Hardman of Birmingham. Richly coloured, they depict St Peter and other local saints, such as St Edward the Confessor and St Thomas Becket.

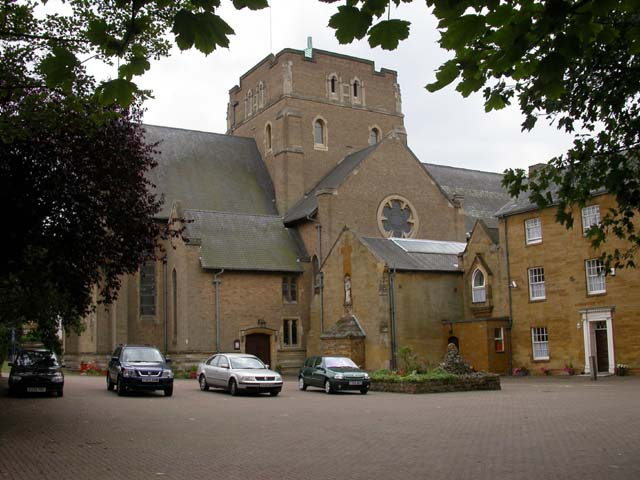
West side extension of the cathedral

=== Extension ===
The cathedral was left in this form until 1948 when it was decided by Bishop Leo Parker that the west end of the cathedral should be extended. This meant that part of St Andrew's chapel had to be demolished in order for the development to go ahead. The part of the chapel that survived, including the original altar, is now in the sacristy and chapter room of the cathedral. The building work was finally completed, seven years later in 1955. Albert Herbert was the architect and he oversaw the original west end being replaced by a straight west end as well as the transepts and a crossing tower being built. Bishop Leo Parker died in 1975 and he was buried in Blessed Sacrament Chapel.

=== Reordering ===
In 1998, the sanctuary was re-ordered. A new window, designed by Joseph Nuttgens (a student of Karl Parsons and who has a work installed in Windsor Castle), was put into the Blessed Sacrament Chapel, the original choir stalls from the main altar were moved into the chapter room and the cathedra (or bishop's throne) was replaced with one carved by Stephen Foster; designed to accompany the triptych of the Holy Spirit behind it.

== Music ==
The cathedral has two organs. The first is a historical tracker-action pipe organ. It was built in 1976 by Hendrik ten Bruggencate and was inspired by the Swiss firm Metzler Orgelbau. The tracker-action instrument is relatively small, only containing I, II and a Pedal division, which is unenclosed. This organ is the instrument used to accompany the Northampton Cathedral Choir. Here is the full layout of the Organ:

A photo of the 1976 tracker-action pipe organ at Northampton Cathedral.

II: Gedackt 8', Rohrfluit 4', Sesquialtera II, Gemshorn 2' and a Quint 1 1/3', which is the only mutation on the organ.

I: Prestant 8', Octaaf 4', Trompet 8' and a Mixture (IV).

Pedal: Subbass 16'.

Couplers: II to I, I to Pedal and II to Pedal.

The other is a digital custom-made Viscount organ that was installed in May 2008. The console is in the west gallery.

The cathedral also has a regular choir that sings in the 11:00 Sunday Mass and other major Cathedral liturgies.

== Parish ==
The cathedral also operates as a parish church and hosts various voluntary parish organisations. In particular the local Society of Saint Vincent de Paul meet there to organise serving the poor and disadvantaged of the local area.

== See also ==
- Diocese of Northampton
- Northampton
- List of churches in Northampton
