= Dudley Cary-Elwes =

Dudley Charles Cary-Elwes (5 February 1868 – 1 May 1932) was English Catholic prelate who served as Bishop of Northampton from 1921 to 1932.

== Biography ==
Born in Nice, France, on 5 February 1868 to Valentine Dudley Henry Cary Elwes & his second wife Alice Geraldine (née Ward), Cary-Elwes was ordained to the priesthood on 30 May 1896 in Rome. He was appointed Bishop of Northampton on 21 November 1921. His consecration to the episcopate took place on 15 December 1921, the principal consecrator was Cardinal Francis Bourne, Archbishop of Westminster, and the principal co-consecrators were Bishop Arthur Doubleday of Brentwood and Bishop Thomas Dunn of Nottingham.

Cary-Elwes died in office on 1 May 1932, aged 64, and was buried at Great Billing, Northamptonshire.

Catholic Church titles
Preceded by Frederick William Keating	Bishop of Northampton; 1921–1932	Succeeded by Laurence William Youens
