= Reginald Dunne =

IRA member (1898–1922)

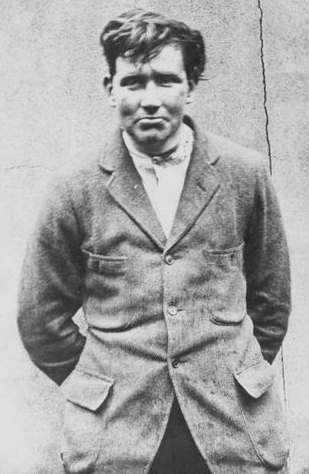
1922 Photograph of Dunne shortly before his execution

Reginald William Dunne (June 1898 – 10 August 1922) was Battalion Commandant of the London Battalion, Irish Republican Army (IRA) and one of two men hanged for the murder of Field Marshal Sir Henry Wilson.

Dunne, the only child of Robert and Mary Dunne, was born (as his mother had been) in Woolwich. He attended St Ignatius' College in Tottenham, North London. His father had been a British soldier and Reginald served as a British Army private in the Irish Guards who fought in the First World War.

In late 1919 Dunne was in charge of a joint IRA/Irish Republican Brotherhood body in London which worked to procure arms for shipment to Ireland. On 22 June 1922, Dunne and Joseph O'Sullivan killed Field Marshal Sir Henry Wilson in London. Dunne managed to escape, but O'Sullivan, who had lost a leg in the First World War was captured by an angry crowd. Dunne returned to try to help O'Sullivan. He was also captured after shooting and wounding two police officers and a passerby.

On trial, Dunne addressed the jury about how in the recent Great War he had been "fighting for the principles for which this country [the UK] stood. Those principles I found as an Irishman were not applied to my own country..."

Dunne wrote a speech which he was prevented from making from the dock (reprinted in the Irish Independent, 21 July 1922). In it, he blamed Wilson for the "Orange Terror", as the Military Adviser to the Belfast Government who had established the Ulster Special Constabulary. and went on to say:

We took our part in supporting the aspirations of our fellow-countrymen in the same way as we took our part in supporting the nations of the world who fought for the rights of small nationalities... The same principles for which we shed our blood on the battle-field of Europe led us to commit the act we are charged with. ... You can condemn us to death today, but you cannot deprive us of the belief that what we have done was necessary to preserve the lives and the happiness of our countrymen in Ireland. You may, by your verdict, find us guilty, but we will go to the scaffold justified by the verdict of our own consciences.

Referring to Sir Henry Wilson he wrote: "He was at the time of his death the Military Advisor to what is colloquially called the Ulster Government, and as Military Advisor he raised and organized a body of men known as the Ulster Special Constabulary, who are the principal agents in his reign of terror."

He was found guilty after three minutes. He was sentenced to death by Mr Justice Shearman. Despite a petition of 45,000 signatures, and a plea for clemency from many prominent figures at the time, including playwright George Bernard Shaw, both men were hanged for Wilson's murder at Wandsworth Prison on 10 August 1922 and buried within the prison grounds. In mid August 1929 Irish Republicans in London unveiled a plaque commemorating Dunne and O'Sullivan. In 1967, Dunne and O'Sullivan were reburied in Deans Grange Cemetery, Ireland.

== Alias ==
While under arrest, Dunne was charged under the alias James Connolly (possibly in tribute to the Irish leader of that name).

== Sources ==
- Field Marshal Sir Henry Wilson: A Political Soldier, Keith Jeffery, Oxford University Press, 2006, ISBN 978-0-19-820358-2
- Who's Who in the Irish War of Independence and Civil War 1916-1923, O'Farrell, Padraic, The Lilliput Press, Dublin, 1997, ISBN 1-874675-85-6
