= William Wareing =

British Roman Catholic Bishop

- Bishop of Northampton
- Diocese: Northampton
- See: Northampton
- Appointed: 29 September 1850
- Term ended: 24 January 1858
- Predecessor: None
- Successor: Francis Kerril Amherst
- Other post: Titular Bishop of Rhithymna
- Previous posts: Vicar Apostolic of Eastern District (1840-1850); Titular Bishop of Areopolis (1840-1850)

Orders
- Ordination: 28 September 1815
- Consecration: 21 September 1840 by Thomas Walsh

Personal details
- Born: 14 February 1791 London, United Kingdom
- Died: 26 December 1865 (aged 74)
- Buried: East Bergholt, Suffolk, United Kingdom
- Denomination: Roman Catholic

Bishop William Wareing (14 February 1791 – 26 December 1865) was the first Roman Catholic Bishop of the Diocese of Northampton.

Born at Lincoln's Inn Fields, London, and after studying at Oscott College, William Wareing was ordained as a Catholic priest on 28 September 1815, aged 24, by Bishops Thomas Walsh, Nicholas Wiseman (later Cardinal Wiseman) and George Hilary Brown.

He worked first on the mission at Moseley, then at Creswell, Staffordshire, until in 1831 when he moved to Grantham in Lincolnshire. In 1833 he moved on to Stamford where he was the town's first properly resident parish priest (or "missionary rector", as they were then called) since the English Reformation. There, he was at least in part responsible for the erection of the new Catholic chapel, a small Gothic building, in 1834, when it was one of only seven Catholic chapels across the whole of Lincolnshire. In 1838, Wareing was appointed one of three "Grand Vicars" for the Midland District and was consecrated as the titular bishop in partibus of Areopolis (an ancient diocese in Palestine long since lost to the Church). More significantly, in 1840, he was appointed as Vicar Apostolic of the newly established Eastern District, which comprised the nine counties of Lincolnshire, Rutland, Huntingdonshire, Northamptonshire, Cambridgeshire, Norfolk, Suffolk, Bedfordshire and Buckinghamshire. He selected Northampton as the seat of the Vicars Apostolic, and subsequently the Roman Catholic Bishops of Northampton.

On 29 September 1850, aged 59, he was appointed the first Bishop of Northampton following the re-establishment of the Catholic Hierarchy.

On 21 December 1858, aged 67, he resigned as Bishop of Northampton, and was appointed Titular Bishop of Rhithymna. He retired to Old Hall, East Bergholt, Suffolk. He died, aged 74, as Bishop Emeritus of Northampton and Titular Bishop of Rhithymna. He was buried in East Bergholt Cemetery, near Ipswich. He had been a priest for 50 years and a bishop for 25 years.

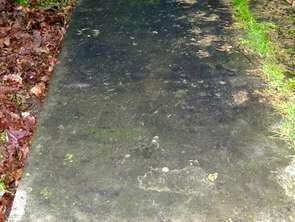
The grave of William Wareing in East Bergholt Cemetery, Suffolk.

In 1845 he received into the Catholic Church the former Anglican Vicar of Elton, Cambridgeshire, Frederick William Faber, whose hymns and writings went round the English-speaking world.
