= Terence Patrick O'Sullivan =

British civil engineer (1913–1970)

- O'Sullivan in c. 1966
- Born: 26 September 1913; Shoreditch, London, England
- Died: 26 February 1970 (aged 56); Surrey, England
- Education: University of London
- Occupation: Civil engineer
- Spouse: Eileen Burnell

Terence Patrick O'Sullivan (1913–1970) was a British civil engineer. He specialised initially in steel and reinforced concrete structures. Later he founded a firm of consulting engineers, T. P. O'Sullivan & Partners, which grew to have offices on four continents and made a reputation in the field of infrastructure development, particularly in the developing world.

== Early life ==
O'Sullivan was born on 26 September 1913 in Shoreditch, London, to Patrick Joseph O'Sullivan, an Irish Catholic doctor formerly in the British Army medical service in India, and his third wife, Emma Agnes Callingham.

Terence O'Sullivan was educated by the Jesuits at St Ignatius' College in Stamford Hill. He was the youngest child but had six sisters, and in the climate of the period was left with burdensome family responsibilities when his father died in 1923.

On leaving school he chose to go into engineering. Though still supporting his widowed mother, he combined studying at the Regent Street Polytechnic between 1929 and 1932, for a degree as an external student of the University of London, with working on the Shenington to Gidea Park railway line in Essex, the last new railway to be built in England before the Channel Tunnel link at the end of the century.

== Early career ==
His first job after graduation was with a newly founded consulting engineering firm, L. G. Mouchel and Partners. Mouchel was a French engineer noted for his work in reinforced concrete structures who set up his firm in England during the 1900s. There O'Sullivan came under the influence of an eminent French engineer and associate of Mouchel, Clément Gilbin, and for ever afterwards was an admirer of the creativity of French engineering.

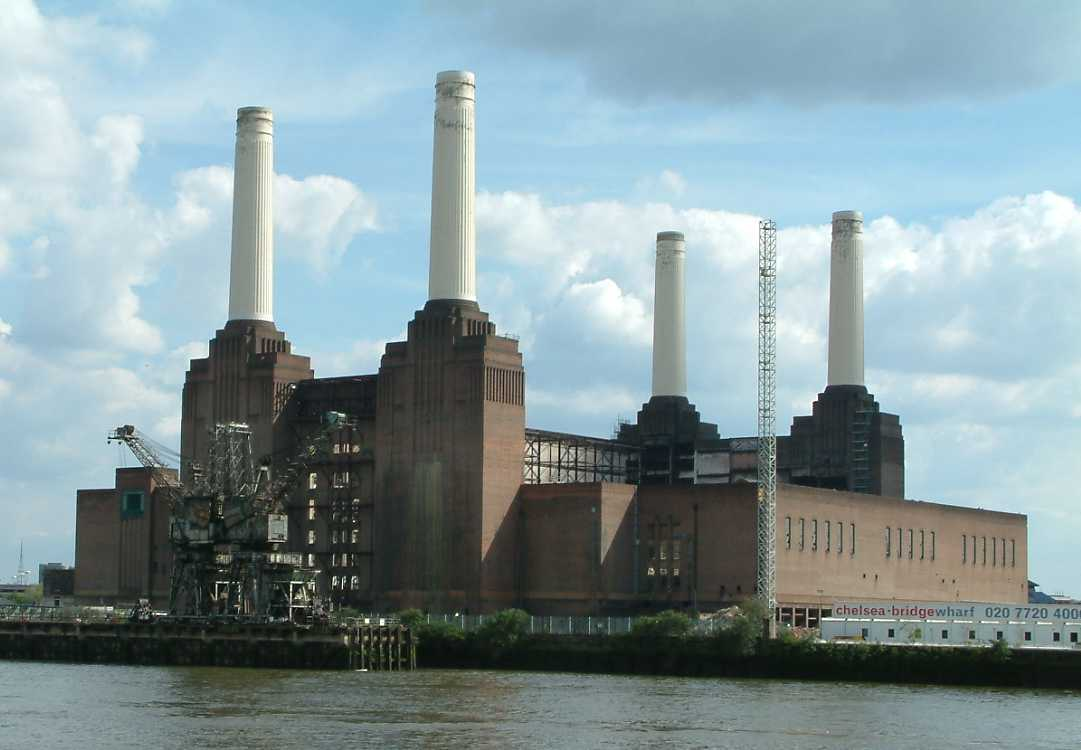
Battersea Power Station

In 1937, since Mouchel's paid only four pounds ten shillings per week and his first child was on the way, he joined the London Power Company and took part in the design of Battersea Power Station. As with many professionals at the time, his career was thrown off course by the Second World War: in 1938 he began a five-year term working for the Air Ministry Works Division on a series of airfield construction projects throughout Great Britain. Next he was involved with the construction of the fourth and final chimney at Battersea, as well as with the design of Deptford Power Station. During this period he returned to university as an external student, all the while doing a demanding full-time job and bringing up a family of three boys. He was awarded a PhD by the University of London for a thesis on reinforced concrete design. This was later published by Pitmans as The Economic Design of Rectangular Reinforced Concrete Sections, a book notable for its clarity and concision of style.

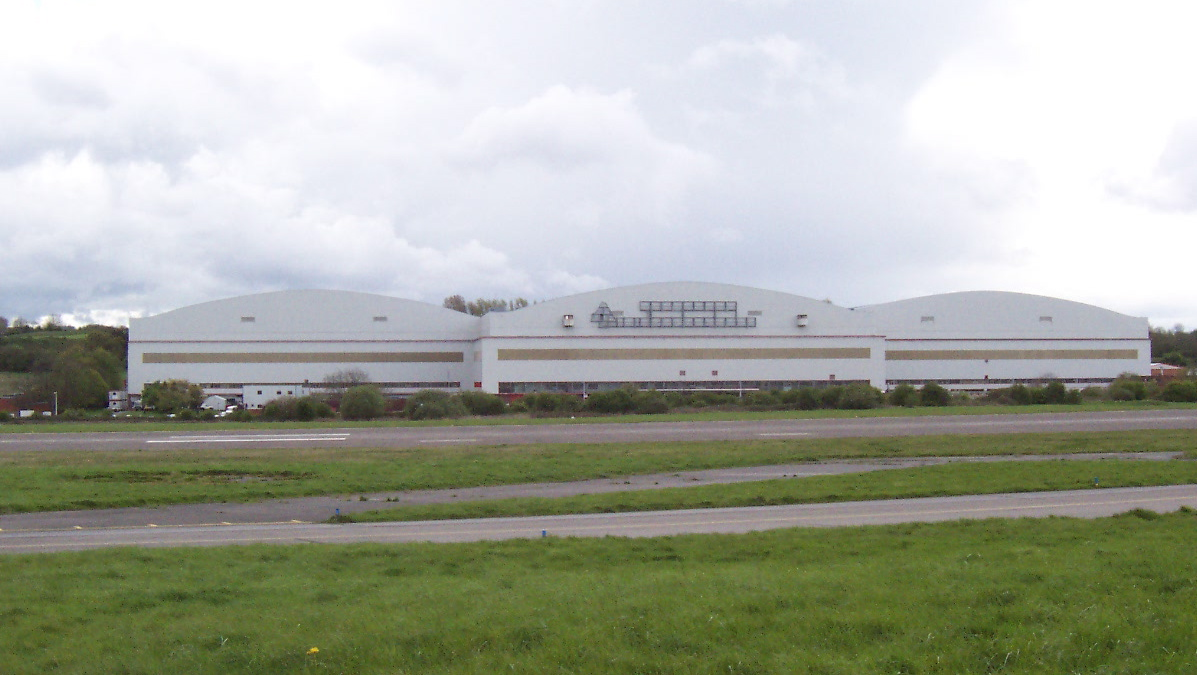
The Assembly Hall, Filton Aerodrome, known as the "Brab Hangar"

He returned to consulting engineering and joined Brian Colquhoun & Partners. Colquhoun had been resident engineer on the Mersey Tunnel, and became an associate of Lord Beaverbrook, involved in the accelerated construction of aircraft factories. At the end of the war he had proved his engineering credentials and was well connected within the government of the time: his firm flourished. O'Sullivan was appointed its Chief Engineer, and in this capacity tackled a deep water dock scheme in India, a £10m tunnel scheme in Argentina, and major reconstruction work for the Gas Board at Beckton, as well as embarking on his chef d'œuvre, the design of the Assembly Hall at Bristol in which was built the gigantic Bristol Brabazon aircraft. This, a steel and glass edifice, was at the time the second largest building by volume in the world, and had the largest door. It could house three Brabazon aircraft of 230 ft wingspan, side by side, and its design and construction required O'Sullivan to extend current steel structure design theory.

His work on this led to a paper The Strengthening of Steel Structures Under Load, for which he was awarded a Telford Premium by the Institution of Civil Engineers. He also published a paper on the testing of concrete piles in the 1948 inaugural volume of the Institution's flagship journal, Géotechnique. On 25 September 1951 he became a Fellow (in those days called a Member) of the Institution, in which capacity he contributed to discussions in its Works Construction Division and Structural and Building Engineering Division.

== T. P. O'Sullivan and Partners ==
In 1952, O'Sullivan left employment and went into partnership with Charles Brown to found a consulting firm named Brown, O'Sullivan and Partners. The new firm was engaged to design a water supply scheme for Medellín in Colombia, and O'Sullivan went there to initiate the work. After his return to England, and while the project was under construction, it became evident that there were differences between him and Brown on the conduct of the business. Brown saw himself as the businessman who would run the firm, with O'Sullivan as the 'boffin' who would limit his activities to technical work. Their views on this were irreconcilable, and the partnership was dissolved. O'Sullivan then needed a job, and took employment as Resident Engineer responsible for a new power station at Kaduna in northern Nigeria. After that he returned to England and founded his own consultancy firm, T. P. O'Sullivan and Partners.

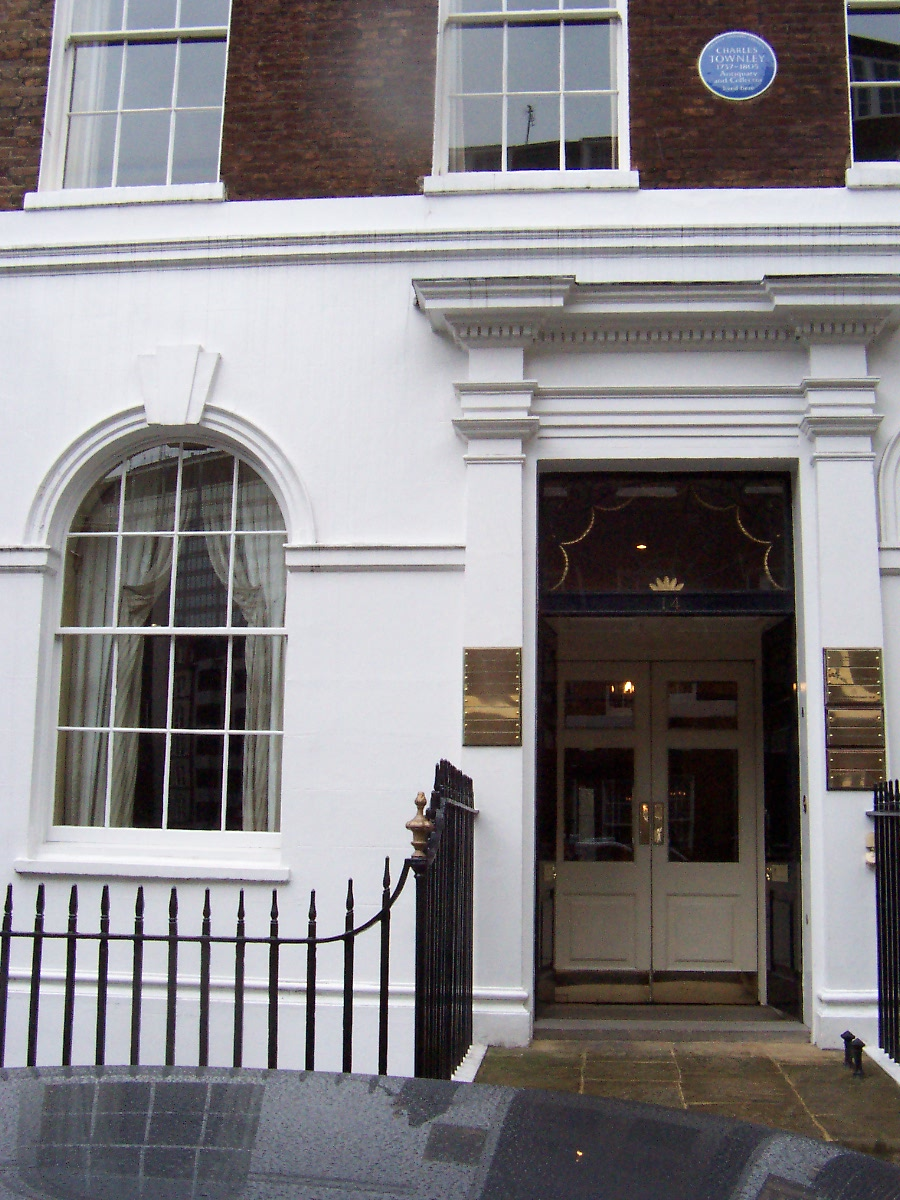
14 Queen Anne's Gate, the home of T P O'Sullivan & Partners for many years

The firm's first offices were at 1 Church Terrace in Richmond in outer London. From there it moved to Westminster, to an area near Parliament which had become favoured by Victorian engineers promoting canals and railways, and was still popular with the profession. O'Sullivan settled his firm at 14 Queen Anne's Gate, a fine building erected in 1772 by Charles Townley and enjoying a view over St James's Park and ease of access to the Institution of Civil Engineers in Great George Street.

The firm arrived at the right time to benefit from post-war economic expansion. Before long it consisted effectively of two practices. One specialised in UK transport design, from an office in Leeds. Though undertaking a wide range of work, it played in particular a significant role in the bridge construction and alteration needed under the Rail Modernisation Plan for the West Coast Main Line electrification, which was carried out in England in the late 1950s to the mid-1960s, and in Scotland in the 1970s.

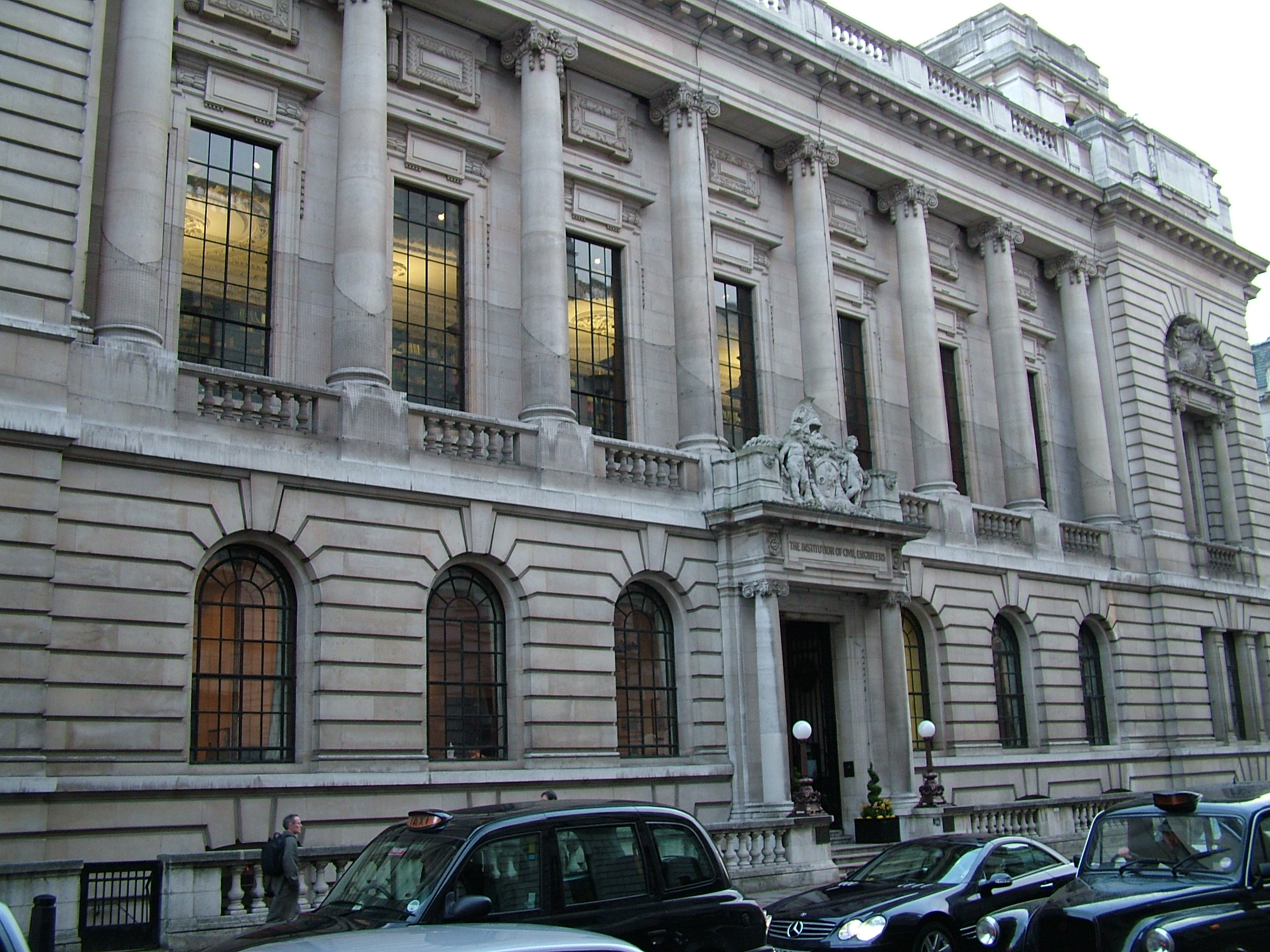
The Institution of Civil Engineers

The other practice, based in the London office, focused on transport projects in the developing world. Work was done in over thirty countries, and offices were established in Bangkok (1964), Nairobi (1968), Kingston (Jamaica) (1971), Jakarta (1973) and, much later, Hanoi (1995). The firm worked for many national governments as well as the major international funding agencies, including the UK Department for International Development, the Asian Development Bank and the World Bank. It established a worldwide reputation in the field of transport development, and was given the Queen's Award for Export Achievement in 1981.

O'Sullivan's later years were overshadowed by chronic illness, and he died on 26 February 1970 at the early age of 56. The work of the firm was carried on under the management of his wife, Eileen, and two of his sons, Kevin and Shaun. They brought forward key members of the staff as partners, and later as directors, of the company, and introduced an employee share-owning scheme whereby staff at all levels were able to participate in the ownership of the firm. Between 1984 and 1987 a series of O'Sullivan Lectures was sponsored by the firm in its founder's memory, and published privately.

In 1992 T P O'Sullivan and Partners merged with consulting engineers Frank Graham. The O'Sullivan name was dropped in the UK, but the international subsidiary responsible for overseas operations became O'Sullivan and Graham Ltd. In 1997 the Graham Group, whose headquarters had by then moved to Shinfield in Berkshire, was acquired by the publicly quoted WSP Group. Trading continued under the name of O'Sullivan and Graham Ltd until 2015.

== Private life ==
During his time at Mouchel's O'Sullivan lodged at 38 Lisbon Avenue in Twickenham and commuted each day to his office in Westminster. On the morning train one day he fell into conversation with a girl whom he had seen in church and who was working at a firm of estate agents in Piccadilly. In 1936 he married her: Eileen Burnell. She came from an Army family: her father was a clarinettist who became bandmaster of the King's Shropshire Light Infantry and taught at the Royal Military School of Music at Kneller Hall, and an uncle, Francis Wallington, was a highly decorated officer in the Royal Horse Artillery. She was born in Dublin, was in India in early childhood, and was educated in convent schools at Wiesbaden in Germany and Farnborough in Hampshire.

O'Sullivan established a family home in Richmond in outer London, later moving across the county boundary to Long Ditton in Surrey. He had five sons, all educated at Beaumont or Stonyhurst. He was widely read, with a fine sense for language; and was a keen speaker and writer for the general public, publishing occasionally in the daily press and contributing a number of articles on science and engineering to the Children's Britannica. He was a devout Catholic and a prison visitor, and carried from his childhood an enthusiasm for Irish culture. He was a member of St Stephen's Club, conveniently near to his office. He is buried at Long Ditton.
