= Frank Thomas (Australian footballer) =

Australian rules footballer, born 1905

Personal information
- Full name: Frank Charles Thomas
- Born: 19 January 1905; Kerang, Victoria
- Died: 6 May 2001 (aged 96); Carnegie, Victoria
- Original team: Oakleigh
- Height: 188 cm (6 ft 2 in)
- Weight: 76 kg (168 lb)

Playing career^{1}
Years	Club	Games (Goals)
1927	Hawthorn	10 (4)
1933–1934	Sturt (SANFL)	16 (6)
- ^{1} Playing statistics correct to the end of 1934.

Frank Charles Thomas (19 January 1905 – 6 May 2001) was an Australian rules footballer who played with Hawthorn in the Victorian Football League (VFL) and Sturt in the South Australian National Football League (SANFL)

== Early life ==
The fourth of the five children of the Rev James William Thomas (1863–1949) and Annie Amelia James (1867–1938), Frank Charles Thomas was born at Kerang on 19 January 1905.

After the first couple of years of his life in Kerang, the Thomas family moved to Hamilton and then Shepparton and then Richmond. Frank Thomas completed his schooling at Melbourne High School.

== Football ==
After leaving school, Thomas played with the Y.M.C.A. team in the Melbourne Districts Association before transferring to Oakleigh in 1921. He trained with Richmond in 1922, playing a single game with the senior team in a match against a Ballarat League combination before returning to Oakleigh. In 1926 he played with Elsternwick in the Metropolitan Amateur competition.

Thomas was granted a permit from Richmond to Hawthorn early in the 1927 season. He made his debut in Round 5, against Carlton and he played ten of the remaining fourteen games that season, being part of a losing side on each occasion.

Thomas returned to Oakleigh in 1928 and then played with Kew from 1929.

In 1933, Thomas was granted a permit to play with Sturt in the SANFL where he played for two years.

== Later life ==
On 11 May 1929, Frank Thomas married Olive Blanche Hallo at Kew Baptist Church.

Thomas worked as a banker, commencing as a bank clerk and ultimately serving as a branch manager for the Bank of N.S.W. in locations including Mildura, Camperdown and Seaforth. Following his retirement, he returned to Victoria and lived at Carnegie in South-East Melbourne.

Frank Charles Thomas died on 5 May 2001 at Carnegie and was cremated at Springvale Botanical Cemetery.
