= Frank J. Thomas (printer) =

American photographer, typographer, and printer (1936–2019)

Frank J. Thomas (1936–2019) was an American photographer, typographer, and printer. In 1959 he and his wife Phyllis founded Tenfingers Press in Los Angeles, out of "a desire to print and publish small books for a limited public." Their output over the next 21 years was eclectic, ranging from literary epigrams done in whimsical typography to miniature books to a history of California cattle brands.
