= Kevin Hyland =

British police officer

External videos
- UK calls for global effort to fight slavery, Matter Of Fact With Stan Grant, ABC News, May 2018

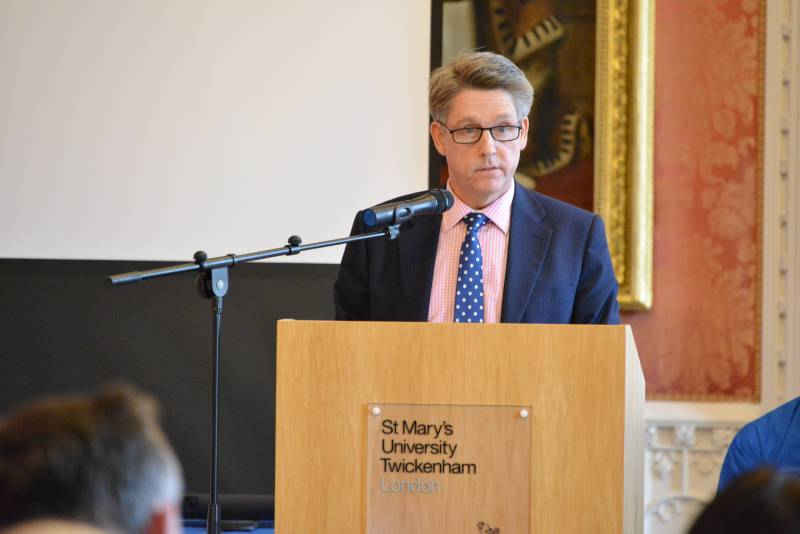
Hyland in 2015

Kevin Hyland OBE (born 1963) is a former British police officer and member of the Armed Forces (Army), who was the United Kingdom's first Independent Anti-Slavery Commissioner, leading efforts to tackle slavery and human trafficking. He was the first holder of that post, from November 2014 to May 2018. He is the chair of IHRB's Leadership Group for Responsible Recruitment, a collaboration between leading companies and expert organisations to drive positive change in the way that migrant workers are recruited. He was formerly head of the London Metropolitan Police Service's Human Trafficking Unit.

== Police career ==
Hyland was a police officer for 30 years until retiring from the force as a detective inspector in 2014. As a senior detective, Hyland specialised in various crimes throughout his policing career, including homicide, gun crime, anti-corruption and then human trafficking and slavery. When working as a senior investigating officer, Hyland was responsible for the convictions of a large number of international organised crime groups, which included conducting multi-national joint investigation teams leading to bi-lateral prosecutions various criminal offences including money laundering, corruption, sexual exploitation and human trafficking.

In 2010, Hyland was appointed as the lead for the London Metropolitan Police's Human Trafficking Unit. During his tenure, the London Metropolitan Police saw an increase in victim identifications and successful prosecutions of traffickers. He retired from the MPS in 2014 with the rank of Detective Inspector in order to accept the position of "anti-slavery tsar".

Prior to being a police officer, Hyland served in the Royal Military Police.

== Independent Anti-Slavery Commissioner ==
The creation of an Independent Commissioner is one of the main provisions of the UK's Modern Slavery Act 2015. Hyland was appointed to the role in November 2014 and acted as 'designate' Commissioner until the Bill received Royal Assent in March 2015, when he became Commissioner. He resigned in May 2018.

Hyland alleged that young children are made to do begging, pickpocketing and shoplifting in a manner similar to what happens in the novel, Oliver Twist by Charles Dickens. He said 151 convictions for slavery-related offences occurred in 2014 which he felt was far too few. Hyland said police were doing too little to prevent contemporary slavery in the UK:

I see cases where I'm meeting victims and hear their cases have not been investigated properly. These are things that really need to change, what's really worrying is the numbers of investigations aren't sufficiently high. The reason why people are choosing this form of criminality is because there aren't the resources tackling it.

Hyland wanted police forces to make dealing with slavery "one of the highest priorities".

In 2016 Hyland urged members of the public in London to report brothels and flats used for human trafficking. He highlighted risk of labour exploitation on high streets, in car washes and nail bars. He also called on ministers to deport foreign diplomats found to be keeping staff in slave conditions, and to implement reforms intended to make it easier for victims to escape abusive employers.

In 2015 he led efforts for inclusion of human trafficking and modern slavery in the 15-year UN Sustainable Development Goals. This was secured as SDG 8.7 on the final day of negotiations at the UN in New York in the summer of 2015. This has resulted in many global efforts focussed on fighting modern slavery and human trafficking, including Alliance 8.7, an initiative led by the International Labour Organisation.

== Santa Marta Group ==
Hyland helped to establish the Santa Marta Group, a body comprising international law enforcement agencies, civil society, NGOs and the Catholic Church.

The body was launched by Pope Francis at the Vatican in April 2014, and is named after the Papal residence, where delegates stayed during the first meeting. At the launch Pope Francis described human trafficking as "an open wound on the body of contemporary society; a crime against humanity". The group was developed by the Catholic Bishops' Conference of England and Wales in collaboration with the London Metropolitan Police and is led by Cardinal Vincent Nichols, the Archbishop of Westminster.

== Praeveni Global ==
Hyland is the chief executive officer of Praeveni Global, a non-profit based in the United States that leads global efforts for prevention of modern slavery and human trafficking. Praeveni Global launched the '30by30' campaign at the G20 in 2024. This campaign called on G20 nations to collectively provide US$30 billion annually to fight modern slavery and human trafficking by 2030.

== Honours ==
Hyland was appointed Officer of the Order of the British Empire (OBE) for "services to Policing and Combating Human Trafficking" in the 2015 New Year Honours List.
