= Frank Thomas (bishop) =

Francis Gerard Thomas (20 May 1930 – 25 December 1988) was an English prelate of the Roman Catholic Church. He served as the Bishop of Northampton from 1982 to 1988.

== Life ==
Francis Gerard Thomas was born in Stone, Staffordshire on 20 May 1930.

He was ordained to the priesthood on 5 June 1955. He was appointed the Bishop of the Diocese of Northampton by the Holy See on 27 August 1982. His consecration to the Episcopate took place on 29 September 1982; the principal consecrator was Cardinal Basil Hume, Archbishop of Westminster (and metropolitan of the diocese), and the principal co-consecrators were Maurice Couve de Murville, Archbishop of Birmingham and Patrick McCartie, Titular Bishop of Elmham.

He died in office on 25 December 1988, aged 58, and was buried at Great Billing, Northamptonshire.

Catholic Church titles
Preceded by Charles Alexander Grant	Bishop of Northampton; 1982–1988	Succeeded by Patrick Leo McCartie
