= Bishop of Northampton =

Catholic ecclesial title in England

- Bishopric

catholic
- Incumbent; David Oakley

Location
- Ecclesiastical province: Westminster

Information
- First holder: William Wareing
- Established: 29 September 1850
- Diocese: Northampton
- Cathedral: Northampton Cathedral

The Bishop of Northampton is the Ordinary of the Roman Catholic Diocese of Northampton in the Province of Westminster, England.

The see is in the town of Northampton where the bishop's seat is located in the Cathedral Church of Our Lady and Saint Thomas of Canterbury.

The current bishop is the Right Reverend David Oakley, who was ordained bishop on 19 March 2020. He is on leave of absence.

== History ==
The Apostolic Vicariate of the Eastern District of England was created in 1840 out of the Midland District (which was renamed the Central District) and a couple of counties out of the London District. The Eastern District consisted of the counties of Cambridgeshire (with the Isle of Ely), Huntingdonshire, Lincolnshire, Norfolk, Northamptonshire, Rutland, and Suffolk, all from the former Midland District, and the counties of Bedfordshire and Buckinghamshire from the London District.

On the restoration of the Catholic hierarchy in England and Wales by Pope Pius IX in 1850, most of the Eastern District became the Diocese of Northampton, with the Vicar Apostolic the Eastern District, William Wareing, appointed the first bishop of the diocese. The remainder of the Eastern District (Lincolnshire and Rutland) became part of the Diocese of Nottingham. Through the Local Government Act 1972, a small area of Buckinghamshire became part of Berkshire, and Huntingdonshire and the Isle of Ely merged into Cambridgeshire. The Diocese of Northampton lost territory (Cambridgeshire, Norfolk, and Suffolk) on the creation of the Diocese of East Anglia in 1976.

== List of the bishops of Northampton and its precursor offices ==
=== Vicar Apostolic of the Eastern District ===
Vicar Apostolic of the Eastern District
From	Until	Incumbent	Notes
1840	1850	William Wareing	Appointed Vicar Apostolic of the Eastern District and Titular Bishop of Areopolis on 5 June 1840 and consecrated on 21 September 1840. Became the first Bishop of Northampton on 29 September 1850.

=== Bishops of Northampton ===
Bishops of Northampton
From	Until	Incumbent	Notes
1850	1858	William Wareing	Formerly Vicar Apostolic of the Eastern District (1840–1850). Appointed Bishop of Northampton on 29 September 1850. Resigned on 21 December 1858 and appointed Titular Bishop of Rhithymna. Died on 26 December 1865.
1858	1879	Francis Kerril Amherst	Appointed bishop on 14 May 1858 and consecrated on 4 July 1858. Resigned on 16 October 1879 and appointed Titular Bishop of Sozusa in Palaestina. Died on 21 August 1883.
1880	1907	Arthur George Riddell	Appointed bishop on 27 April 1880 and consecrated on 9 June 1880. Died in office on 15 September 1907.
1908	1921	Frederick William Keating	Appointed bishop on 5 February 1908 and consecrated on 25 February 1908. Translated to the archbishopric of Liverpool on 13 June 1921.
1921	1932	Dudley Charles Cary-Elwes	Appointed bishop on 21 November 1921 and consecrated on 15 December 1921. Died in office on 1 May 1932.
1933	1939	Laurence William Youens	Appointed bishop on 16 June 1933 and consecrated on 25 July 1933. Died in office on 14 November 1939.
1940	1967	Thomas Leo Parker	Appointed bishop on 14 December 1940 and consecrated on 11 February 1941. Resigned on 17 January 1967 and appointed Titular Bishop of Magarmel. Resigned the titular see on 7 December 1970. Died on 25 March 1975.
1967	1982	Charles Alexander Grant	Formerly an auxiliary bishop of Northampton and Titular Bishop of Alinda (1961–1967). Appointed Bishop of Northampton on 14 March 1967. Retired on 16 February 1982 and died on 24 April 1989.
1982	1988	Francis Gerard Thomas	Appointed bishop on 27 August 1982 and consecrated on 29 September 1982. Died in office on 25 December 1988.
1990	2001	Patrick Leo McCartie	Formerly an auxiliary bishop of Birmingham and Titular Bishop of Elmhama (1977–1990). Appointed Bishop of Northampton on 20 February 1990. Retired on 29 March 2001. Died 22 April 2020.
2001	2003	Kevin John Patrick McDonald	Appointed bishop on 29 March 2001 and consecrated on 2 May 2001. Translated to the archbishopric of Southwark on 8 December 2003.
2003	2005	See vacant	
2005	2019	Peter John Haworth Doyle	Formerly a priest of Diocese of Portsmouth (1968–2005). Appointed Bishop of Northampton on 24 May 2005 and consecrated on 28 June 2005.
2020		David Oakley	In October 2025 it was announced that Oakley was taking a leave of absence from his duties for "personal reasons". In June 2026, he was charged with two counts of rape against a female under the age of 16, having been first arrested in September 2025. On 30 June 2026 it was announced that Pope Leo XIV had appointed Richard Moth, the Archbishop of Westminster, as apostolic administrator of the Northampton Diocese in Oakley's absence.

== Bibliography ==
- Brady, W. Maziere (1876). The Episcopal Succession in England, Scotland and Ireland, A.D. 1400 to 1875. Vol. 3. Rome: Tipografia Della Pace.
