= Dorothy Bradbelt =

Dorothy Bradbelt or Broadbelte (died 1577) was an English courtier, a woman of the bedchamber or chamberer to Elizabeth I, described as the "Queen's bedfellow".

== Career at court ==
Her mother was probably Jane Bradbelt a chamberer at court. With Alice Huntercombe, she was appointed to the household of Elizabeth, Henry VIII's daughter, in 1536. A "Mistress Brodebeck" appears in a 1539 gift roll amongst the gentlewomen.

The council of Mary I of England refused permission for Dorothy to serve Elizabeth at Woodstock Palace in June 1554. She was sometimes the queen's bedfellow in the 1560s. Dorothy Bradbelt was bought clothes including a "petticoat of crimson satin razed with a broad border embroidered with silver and fringed, lined with unshorn velvet", and a French kirtle of black velvet. She was also given lucrative rewards, including a lease of lands at Hardingstone, and a licence to export red herrings from London and Ipswich and import white fish.

=== Dymocke affair ===
In 1562, she and Kat Ashley were censured and briefly held for taking part in a scheme for Elizabeth to marry Eric XIV of Sweden promoted by a former usher and jewelry salesman John Dymocke. They wrote a joint letter to a Swedish politician Nicholas Guildenstern, hoping for the best outcome, hinting at the marriage, which was seized by William Cecil.

A poem by Thomas Chaloner, Wanton Bird, alludes to the relationships of gentlewomen at court at this time. Chaloner's "dearest Henne" has been tentatively identified as Dorothy Bradbelt. Chaloner writes of a wanton bird which he sealed in a cage.

=== Royal pets ===
As a servant of Elizabeth, Dorothy kept the queen's parrot and pet monkey. An iron collar for the monkey was made in 1562. In 1563, a craftsmen, John Grene, made a cage for the parrot of "tynker" wire and pewter pots for the pets' water which were delivered to Dorothy. Blanche Parry and Lady Knollys also looked after the monkey.

=== Dressing the queen ===
Dorothy received silk sarsenet to line "cawles" for Elizabeth I. She was given a pin cushion, a "pynpillowe", probably both for sewing work and for the task of dressing the queen. She was also in charge of a set of silver gilt hooks used to display decorative hangings or tapestry in the Privy Chamber.

=== Intaglio seal ===
The Victoria and Albert Museum holds a seal ring with an intaglio cut chalcedony stone with the initials "H.R" for Henry VIII and his portrait, which Dorothy used to seal a document she signed in October 1576. The seal was probably a royal gift to Bradbelt.

The document is a lease of the royal manors of Hallow and Blockley to John Habington and Dorothy in return for flour to make the queen's manchet bread when she was in Worcestershire. A subsequent surrender of the lease in 1581 mentions that Dorothy Habington was deceased.

== Marriage and family ==
Dorothy Bradbelt married John Abington or Habington of Hindlip, Worcestershire, in 1567. He was clerk of the queen's kitchen and later a cofferer to Elizabeth I. According to one version of the family tree, "Dorathey Broadbill" or "Broadbeck" was his second wife, and his first wife was Catharine Wykes from Moreton Jeffries (also said to have been a royal servant). Catharine Wykes was John Habington's cousin.

As a wedding gift, Elizabeth gave Dorothy Bradbelt a Flanders gown of black velvet with satin made by her tailor Walter Fyshe. Elizabeth gave them a lease of the rectory of Utterby in Lincolnshire, confirmed in June 1570. The patent calls Dorothy a gentlewoman of the privy chamber. She signed "dorothye habintoun" as a record of the gift of a crimson petticoat in January 1573.

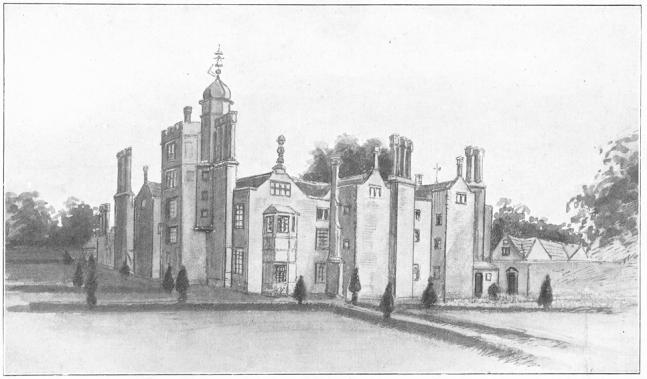
Elizabethan Hindlip Hall

"Mrs Abington" was included in a list of the queen's attendants to be accommodated at Croydon Palace in 1574. An inventory of Elizabeth I mentions a set of hooks of silver gilt to fasten upon hangings of the queen's privy chamber. These were in the keeping of "Mistress Dorothy Abingdon" in March 1575. Possibly, this may refer to another member of the Habingdon family, a niece or sister-in-law.

John Habington, whose parental home was at Brockhampton, bought and rebuilt Hindlip Hall, where a fireplace was dated 1572. His portrait wearing a fur-edged robe survives. Elizabeth I came to Worcestershire in 1575. She stayed at the Bishop's Palace in Worcester and visited Hindlip on 16 August. Habington was said to have been present when the queen hunted at Hallow Park near Worcester. Elizabeth lost a gold button that day. She gave Dorothy a French kirtle of russet during her visit in 1575, the last recorded royal gift to her. Dorothy signed the day book record for the gift, "Dorythe habingtoun".

The historian Treadway Russell Nash mentions a herald's funeral certificate or description for John Habington's wife, who was a gentlewoman of the privy-chamber of Elizabeth in 1557, and was buried at Hindlip at the queen's expense. This lost document must have referred to Dorothy Bradbelt.

There is some doubt over details of the family tree. John Habington's children included:

- Thomas Habington (1560–1647), who married Mary Parker, a daughter of Edward Parker, 12th Baron Morley, their children included the poet William Habington
- Edward Habington
- Richard Habington, who married (1) Bridget Drury, (2) Constance Edmonson. Their children included a Dorothy Habington (said by Nash to have been brought up at court and a zealous Protestant).
- A daughter who was the subject of a marriage negotiation in 1582 for Matthew Browne a son of Thomas Browne of Betchworth Castle.
- Dorothy Habington, said to be a sister of Thomas Habington and brought up at court, a recusant who sheltered Thomas Butler alias Lyster and Edward Oldcorne at Hindlip.

Edward and Thomas Abington were involved in the Babington Plot to replace Elizabeth with Mary, Queen of Scots. Hindlip Hall was entirely rebuilt and later passed to the brewer Henry Allsopp, 1st Baron Hindlip and is now a headquarters building used by West Mercia Police.
