= John Habington =

John Habington or Abington (1515–1581) was an English courtier and administrator.

== Career ==
A son of Richard Habington and his wife Eleanor Hanley of Hanley William, John Habington's parental home was at Brockhampton near Bromyard in Herefordshire. He was born at Hanley William in Worcestershire, where his parents took refuge from the plague in Bromyard.

=== Berwick-upon-Tweed ===
Habington served the royal court in various administrative and financial roles. In October 1557 he was stationed at Berwick-upon-Tweed, involved in the supply of rations for the garrison and army. He was made Surveyor-General of the Victuals at Berwick. The Earl of Northumberland was pleased by the provisions for his house, but Habington discussed his resignation with the Privy Council in April 1559. At this time, Habington bought herring, wheat, cheese, butter, hops, barrells of meal, stockfish, bay salt and bacon from markets in London, Suffolk, and Norfolk. Ralph Sadler was instructed to investigate Habington's work as victualler at Berwick in August 1559. The soldiers complained about the quantity and prices.

His role of victualler at Berwick officially ended in November 1560, and Habington was instructed to give his accounts and the custody of storehouses at Berwick and Lindisfarne to Valentine Browne the new Surveyor General of Berwick. Browne had not arrived by 23 February 1561, when Habington wrote to William Cecil from Berwick about the supplies.

=== Queen's kitchen ===
Habington was then clerk of the queen's kitchen to Elizabeth I, and in September 1580 cofferer to Elizabeth I with Anthony Crane. As a member of the Board of Green Cloth, he advocated for an in-house brewery for the court located at Syon Park. According to Raphael Holinshed, Habington was "an officer of good credit in her highness's house" grateful for his "many advancements".

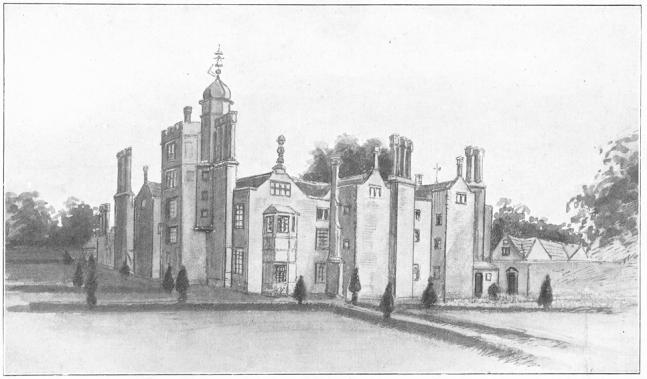
Elizabethan Hindlip Hall

=== Hindlip Hall ===
Habington bought and rebuilt Hindlip Hall near Worcester, where a fireplace was dated 1572. His portrait wearing a fur-edged robe survives. Elizabeth I came to Worcestershire in 1575. She stayed at the Bishop's Palace in Worcester and visited Hindlip on 16 August. Habington attended the queen when she hunted at Hallow Park near Worcester on 18 August. He was keeper of the park (the manor of Hallow belonged to his sister, Dorothy Habington), and Elizabeth discussed with him making a gift of the two buck deer she had killed to the town's bailiffs. Elizabeth lost a gold button that day. She gave his wife Dorothy Habington a French kirtle of russet during her visit in 1575.

In October 1576, Elizabeth I gave John and Dorothy Habington a lease of the royal manors of Hallow and Blockley in return for flour to make the queen's manchet bread when she was in Worcestershire. Dorothy signed a sealed a document connected with the gift using a seal ring stone engraved with a portrait of Henry VIII. The ring is now held by the Victoria and Albert Museum.

John Habington died in 1581 and was buried at Hindlip. His eldest son Thomas and daughter-in-law Mary Habington placed a memorial tablet in the church. The brewery at Syon was not a success, as it was claimed London water made better beer, and it closed soon after his death.

== Marriages and children ==
John Habington's first wife was Catharine Wykes, daughter of John Wykes, whose family was from Moreton Jeffries in Herefordshire. Catharine Wykes was John Habington's cousin.

His second wife was Dorothy Bradbelt, a chamberer to Elizabeth I. They married in 1567. As a wedding gift, Elizabeth gave Dorothy a Flanders gown of black velvet with satin made by her tailor Walter Fyshe. Elizabeth gave them property, including a lease of the rectory of Utterby in Lincolnshire, confirmed in June 1570.

There is some doubt over details of the family tree. John Habington's children included:

- Thomas Habington (1560–1647), born at Thorpe Park near Chertsey, who married Mary Parker, a daughter of Edward Parker, 12th Baron Morley, their children included the poet William Habington. Mary Habington used to be considered as the author of the letter alerting her brother William Parker, 4th Baron Monteagle to the Gunpowder Plot. She signed her letters "Mary Abington". A portrait at Hindlip said to be hers was engraved for Treadway Russell Nash's Collections for the history of Worcestershire.
- Edward Habington.
- Richard Habington, who married (1) Bridget Drury (2) Constance Edmonson. His children included a Dorothy Habington (said by Nash to have been brought up at court and a zealous Protestant).
- A daughter who was the subject of a marriage negotiation in 1582 for Matthew Browne a son of Thomas Browne of Betchworth Castle.
- Dorothy Habington, said to be a sister of Thomas Habington and brought up at court, later a recusant who sheltered Thomas Butler alias Lyster and Edward Oldcorne at Hindlip. Her conversion by Oldcorne was described by John Gerard. Dorothy Habington, her sister-in-law Mary Habington, and Anne Vaux are sometimes identified as those who sustained Oldcorne and Henry Garnet with drinks and caudle through a quill or straw from a "gentlewoman's chamber" while they hid in a priest's hole built into a chimney at Hindlip in 1606. Garnet was supplied with sweetmeats and with marmalade, which might have served to make invisible ink.

Edward and Thomas Abington were involved in the Babington Plot to replace Elizabeth with Mary, Queen of Scots. In 1590, Thomas and Richard Abington were allowed to keep lands pledged for debts incurred by their father John Habington as cofferer. Hindlip Hall was entirely rebuilt and later passed to the brewer Henry Allsopp, 1st Baron Hindlip and is now a headquarters building used by West Mercia Police.
