= Mary Habington =

English Catholic and recusant

Mary Habington or Abington, née Parker was an English recusant. Antiquarian writers thought that she was the author of the anonymous letter to her brother William Parker, 4th Baron Monteagle, which warned of the Gunpowder Plot. This theory is dismissed by modern historians. She sheltered a number of Catholic priests and recusants at her Worcestershire home Hindlip Hall.

== Family background ==
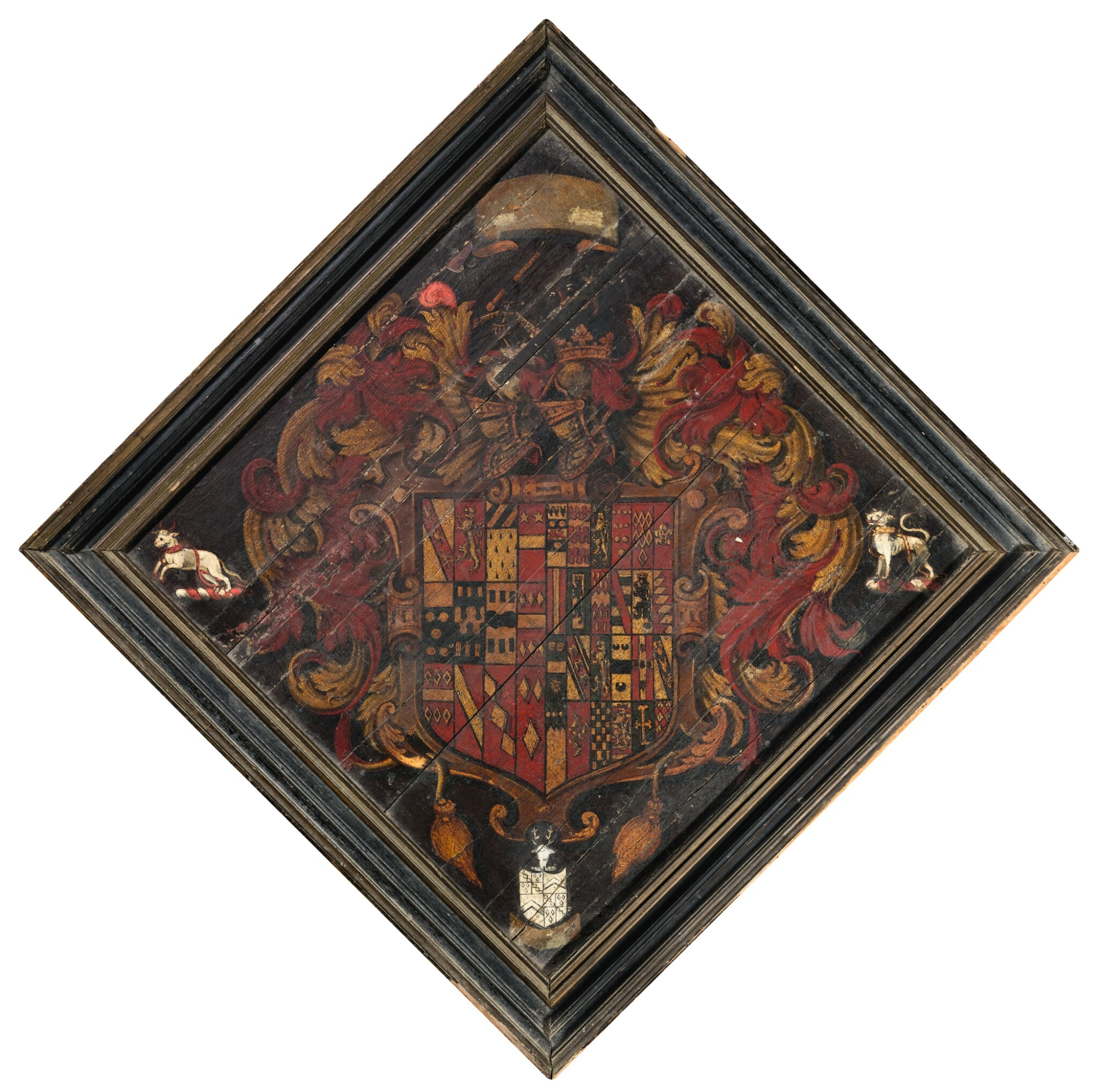
Heraldry of Thomas Habington

She was the eldest daughter of Edward Parker, 12th Baron Morley and Elizabeth Stanley, a daughter of William Stanley, 3rd Baron Monteagle. Around the year 1593, she married Thomas Habington (1560–1647) of Hindlip Hall, a son of Queen Elizabeth's cofferer John Habington and his wife, Catharine Wykes. She signed her letters "Mary Abington".

Dorothy Habington, described as Mary Habington's sister-in-law, was a Catholic convert by 1590. She was identified as a recusant and "spinster" in a list made in 1594. She was said to have been brought up a Protestant at Elizabeth I's court and converted by Edward Oldcorne. Thomas Habington's stepmother Dorothy Habington née Bradbelt (died 1577) had been a member of the royal household.

Dorothy Habington resided at Hindlip, receiving priests including Richard Broughton alias Rowse, and Oldcorne was so frequently at Hindlip that locals thought he was a relative of the family. The 1594 roll of recusants names Thomas Habington's wife as "Dorothy Abyngton", rather than Mary, by mistake. Adding to possible confusion, an 18th-century writer Treadway Russell Nash mentions another Dorothy Habington, a niece of Mary and daughter of Richard Habington, who, he writes, was brought up at court.

== Career ==
=== Monteagle letter ===
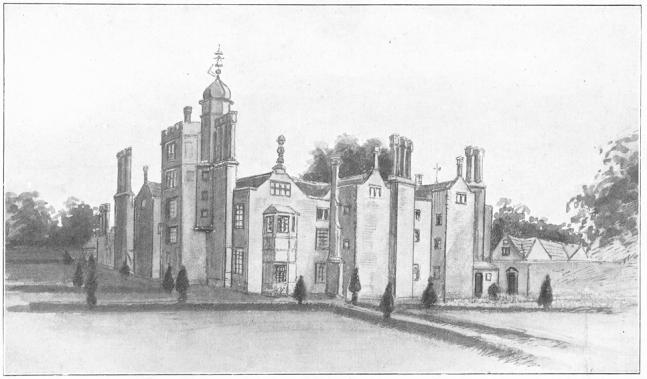
Elizabethan Hindlip Hall

The suggestion that Mary Habington wrote the anonymous letter to her brother in October 1605, hinting at the Gunpowder plot, appears in John Williams's The History of the Gunpowder-treason (1678), attributed to an account of the plot given by her husband Thomas Habington to a "worthy person" in 1645. The suggestion that Mary was the author was attributed to William Dugdale in Anthony à Wood's Athenae Oxonienses published in 1691. Simon Archer was a mutual aquaintaince of Habington and Dugdale.

Elsewhere in the Athenae Oxonienses, Wood attributes the letter to Francis Tresham. In 1781, a historian of Worcestershire, Treadway Russell Nash wrote that Mary Habington's authorship of the letter was a local tradition. It has also been suggested that Mary Habington dictated the letter to her friend Anne Vaux.

According to Oswald Tesimond's narrative, a member of Lord Monteagle's household told the conspirator Thomas Winter about the letter. The conspirators were perturbed, and arranged a meeting on Enfield Chase between Robert Catesby and Francis Tresham. They suspected Tresham, whose sister Elizabeth was married to Monteagle. Tresham convinced them he was not the author.

The centrality of the letter to the discovery of the cellar, gunpowder, and plot, and the official narrative has often been doubted. Some writers, including Antonia Fraser, see the letter as a kind of fake, a political ruse engineered by the Earl of Salisbury. Nevertheless, Hindlip Hall came to be celebrated, as it was believed that, "as much of the plot was there hatch'd, so it was from thence that it came to be prevented".

=== Journey to Hindlip ===
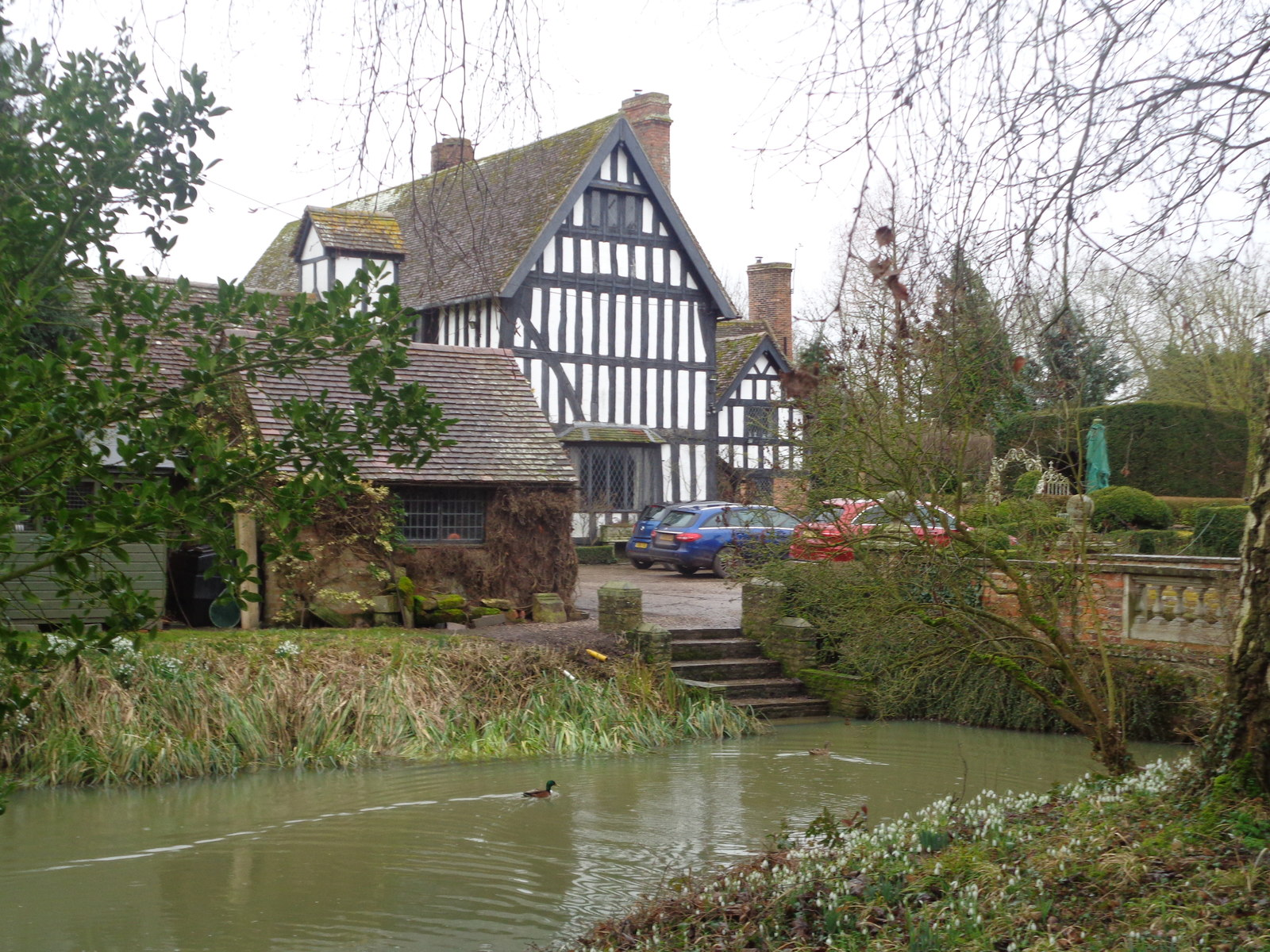
News of the Gunpowder Plot was brought to Hindlip from Huddington Court

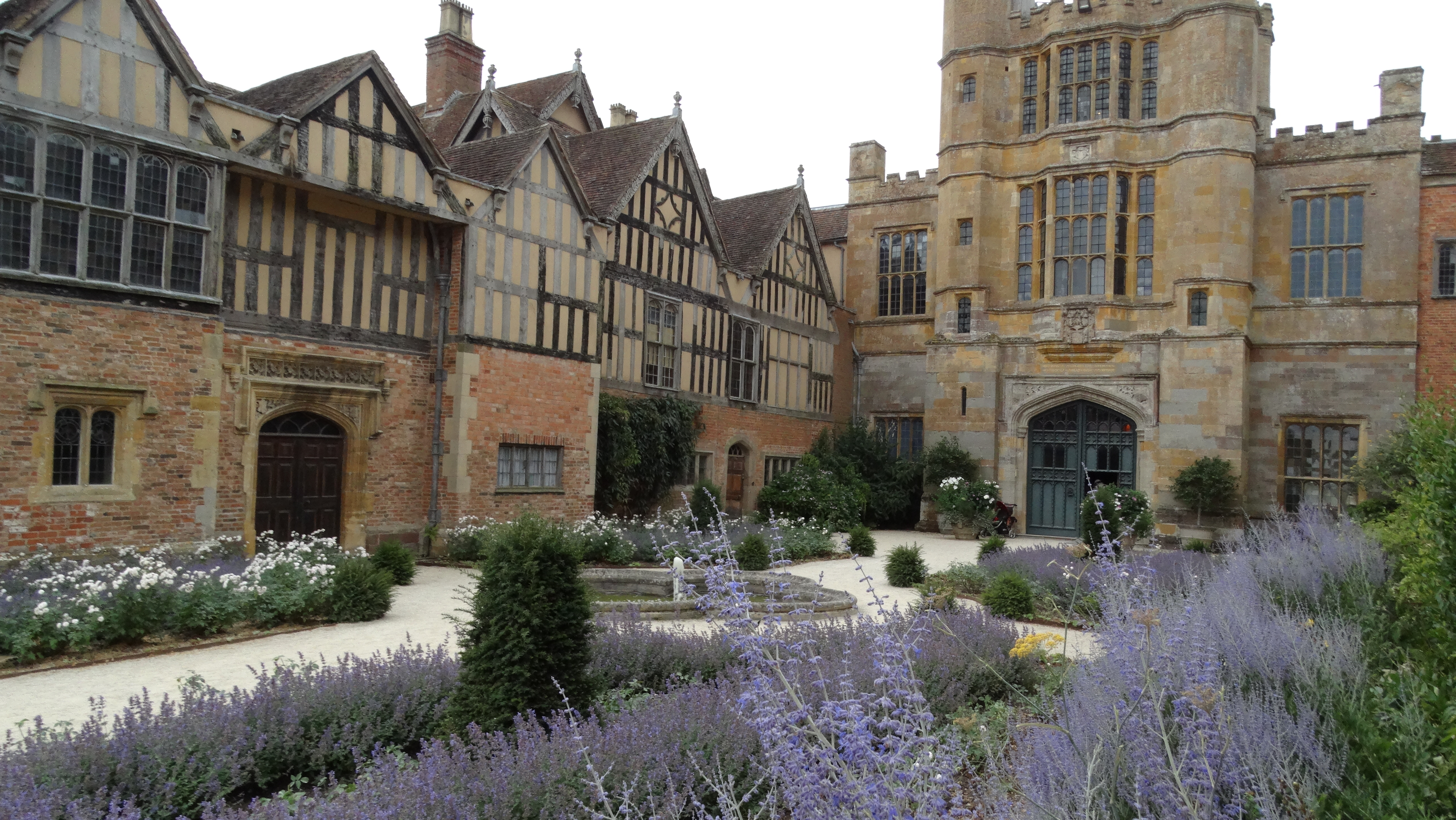
Some priests came from Coughton Court, expecting greater safety at Hindlip

One of the Gunpowder suspects, the priest Thomas Strange (alias Anderton or Hungerford), a cousin of Thomas Habington, and a friend of Ben Jonson, was arrested in November 1605. He said he first heard the news of the plot discovery from Henry Huddleston (a son of Edmund Huddleston of Sawston Hall), while he was at Harrowden (home of the Vaux family and Elizabeth Vaux née Roper) and decided to go to Hindlip. He took a route avoiding Warwick, as he was advised travellers were being "stayed". Strange did not make it to Hindlip, but was arrested at Kenilworth and taken to the Tower of London.

Strange was questioned about his interest in a Papal dispensation for the marriage of Mary, Queen of Scots and Lord Darnley, the parents of King James. Meanwhile, Oswald Tesimond alias Greenway came to Hindlip from Huddington Court bringing news of the plot discovery. Thomas Habington refused to help the plotters or suspects. At least four priests, with lay brothers, and servants came to Hindlip, after travelling from Coughton Court and Evesham before Christmas.

=== Hindlip, January 1606 ===
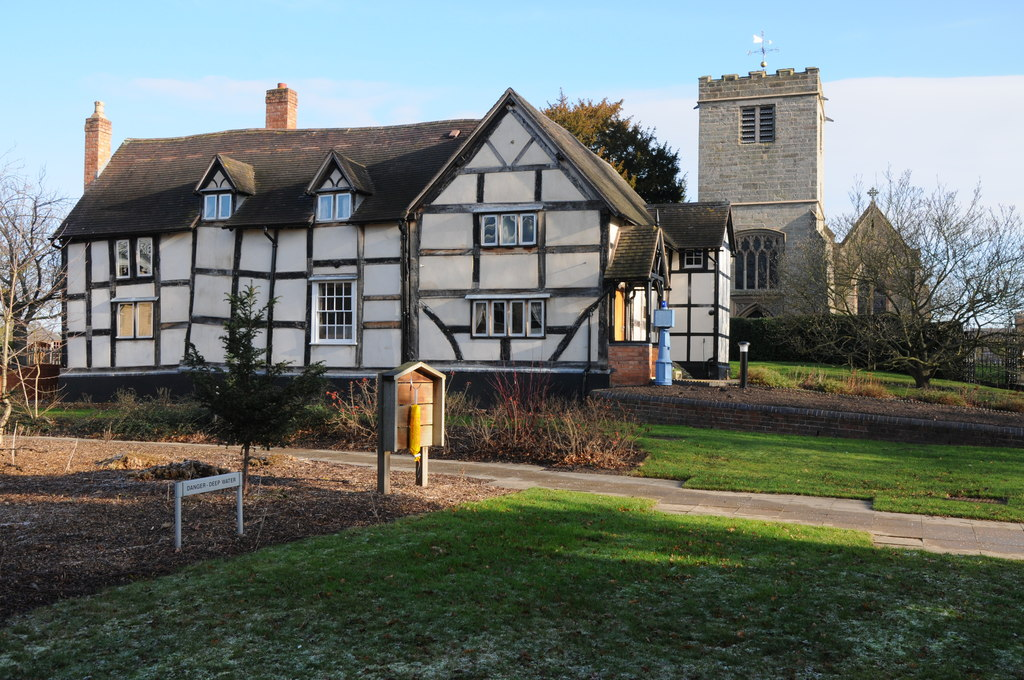
Hindlip church and old houses

On 15 January 1606, a proclamation was made for the arrest of John Gerard alias Brooke, Henry Garnet, and Oswald Tesimond. These three were thought to have been complicit in the Gunpowder Plot. It would be a crime for anyone to harbour or conceal them.

Mary Habington and her friend Anne Vaux were at Hindlip Hall. After Thomas Habington left on business on 18 January, William Colles of Hallow, their tenant and a recusant, came to Hindlip and told Mary Habington that a search was intended. Thomas Lister alias Butler (Dorothy Habington's priest) and Richard Fullwood left immediately. The house was raided two days later by Henry Bromley of Holt Castle, a magistrate searching for Catholic priests. She accepted the authority of his warrant, but he could "never get from Mrs Abington, nor any other in the house, the least glimmering of any of these traitors, or any other treason to be here".

The fugitives hid in carefully concealed priest holes in the long gallery behind panelling (the gallery at Hindlip went around the house "four square" probably at attic level), and built into the chimneys of the house. Bromley and his men stayed at Hindlip, hoping to starve them out of their hiding places. Some of the priests were supplied with drinks and caudle using a quill or straw from a gentlewoman's bedchamber, presumably by Mary Habington, Dorothy Habington, or Anne Vaux, or their trusted servants.

Thomas Habington had been away visiting Sir John Talbot at Pepperhill (at Albrighton). Talbot was the father-in-law of the conspirator Robert Winter. When he returned to Hindlip, he swore there were no priests in the house. Bromley arrested him. Nicholas Owen and Ralph Ashley had no more food than an apple. They left their hiding place in the gallery and tried to evade the watchers, but were captured. They did not reveal their hiding place and the search redoubled. Six days later Henry Garnet and Edward Oldcorne were discovered and surrendered to Bromley. They had started their concealment with a supply of sweetmeats and marmalade (presumably provided by the gentlewomen of the house). Their hiding place was accessed by a trapdoor under the brick hearth of the room above.

Owen may have been the designer of the priest holes at Hindlip. Garnet later referred to his conversations with Oldcorne and their general confessions to each other in the "hole at Hindlip". He also wrote that he would have surrendered himself to Thomas Habington, if he had known that a specific proclamation for his arrest had been made on 15 January.

Mary Habington remained at Hindlip during the searches. Bromley wrote that he "could by no means persuade the Gentlewoman of the house to depart the house, without I should have carried her". He noted that the captives asked for their linen which her maid had washed.

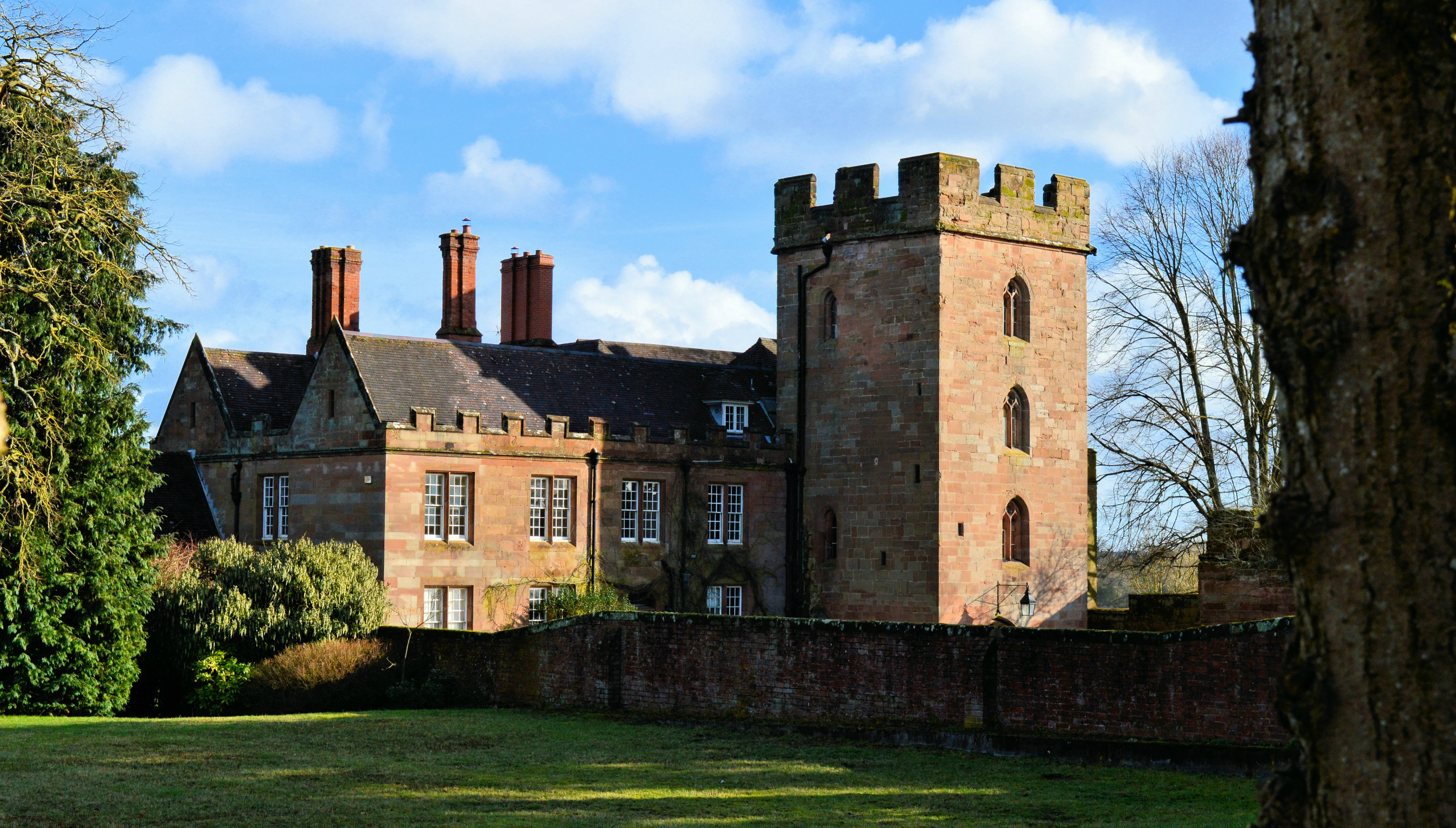
Thomas Bromley took the prisoners from Hindlip to Holt Castle

The prisoners were taken first to Holt Castle, and then to the Tower of London. Their number included Thomas Habington and Edward Jarrett (or Edward Gerard), described as a servant to Dorothy Habington (a sister-in-law of Mary Habington), who had been at Harrowden with Thomas Strange. During their examinations and interrogations, Nicholas Owen said that Garnet and Edward Hall (an alias of Oldcorne) usually dined at Hindlip with Thomas and Mary Habington. Owen acted as Garnet's servant, lighting his fire and other tasks.

A farmer called Perkins was executed at Worcester on 27 January 1606 for harbouring Stephen Lyttelton and Robert Winter after their escape from Holbeche House.

=== London ===
Mary Habington went to London with Anne Vaux, and took a lodging at Fetter Lane. Thomas Habington was put in the Fleet Prison and then Newgate. With the other prisoners he left London for Worcester on 21 March 1606. According to John Gerard, Mary met her captive husband at the start of the journey, at Holborn. She told him her brother Lord Monteagle would be able to secure his reprieve and early release. Habington is said to have replied that his family's support for the mother of James VI and I, Mary, Queen of Scots, would count in his favour. His brother, Edward Habington, had been executed for his part in the Babington Plot in 1586. King James was anxious to prosecute the Gunpowder plotters, but was curious about the Babington Plot, and commissioned portraits of six of the 1586 conspirators from Robert Peake.

=== Trial at Worcester ===
The prisoners were lodged in Worcester's Castle Gaol. They were put on trial in April at the Lent Assizes.

Thomas Habington was questioned about who brought the letter to Hindlip warning of the Bromley's raid. Mary Habington was also questioned about the warning letter. According to Thomas, neither of them named William Colles. The note giving warning of the search had been found by Bromley in Edward Oldcorne's room at Hindlip. His defence included his absence from the house at the time the fugitives took to their hiding places.

Thomas was found guilty on 4 April (of harbouring Garnet), but his life was saved, because of his confessions, and the intervention of Lord Monteagle. The Habington estates property was forfeited, and given to John Drummond (of Hawthornden, a royal usher), though Habington seems to have continued to live at Hindlip. When he made his will in 1642, Mary Habington was still alive.

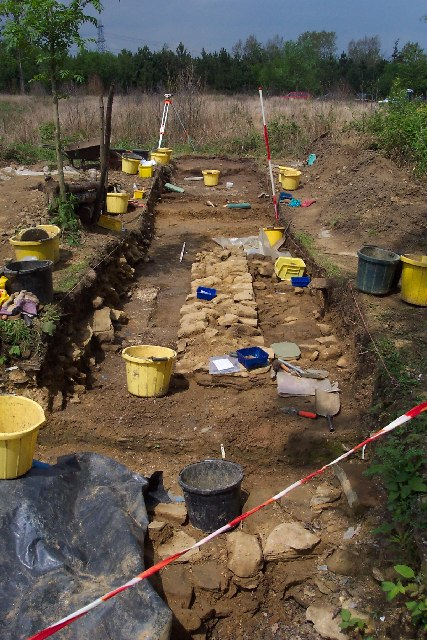
Archaeological dig at Glossam's place, Beckley, one of the Habington properties confiscated in 1606

Dorothy Habington (Thomas' sister) was also included in the attainder of 1606, and forfeited her lands including the manors or farms of Gate and Glossoms in Sussex (near Beckley), and the manor of Hallow in Worcestershire, where her father had hunted with Elizabeth I in August 1575.

=== Portraits ===
A portrait at Hindlip said to be hers was engraved for Treadway Russell Nash's Collections for the history of Worcestershire. Nash mentioned in an Archaeologia article a portrait at Hindlip of Elizabeth Stanley, Lady Morley, Mary Habington's mother. A picture of Robert Winter was displayed at Woollas Hall in Eckington. Nash and Edmond Malone mention that the Hindlip collection in the 18th-century included a portrait said to be of the conspirator Thomas Percy.

== Children ==
Her children included:

- William Habington, who married Lucy Herbert, a daughter of William Herbert, 1st Baron Powis
- Anthony Habington
- Frances Habington, who married John Braithwaite
- Mary Habington, who married Walter Compton
- Elizabeth Habington, who married Francis Fountain
