= Habington =

Habington is a surname. Notable people with the surname include:

- Edward Habington (1553?–1586), one of the conspirators in the Babington plot
- John Habington or Abington (1515–1581), English courtier and administrator
- Mary Habington or Abington, née Parker, English recusant
- Thomas Habington (1560–1647), English antiquarian
- William Habington (1605–1654), English poet
