= Thomas Habington =

English antiquarian

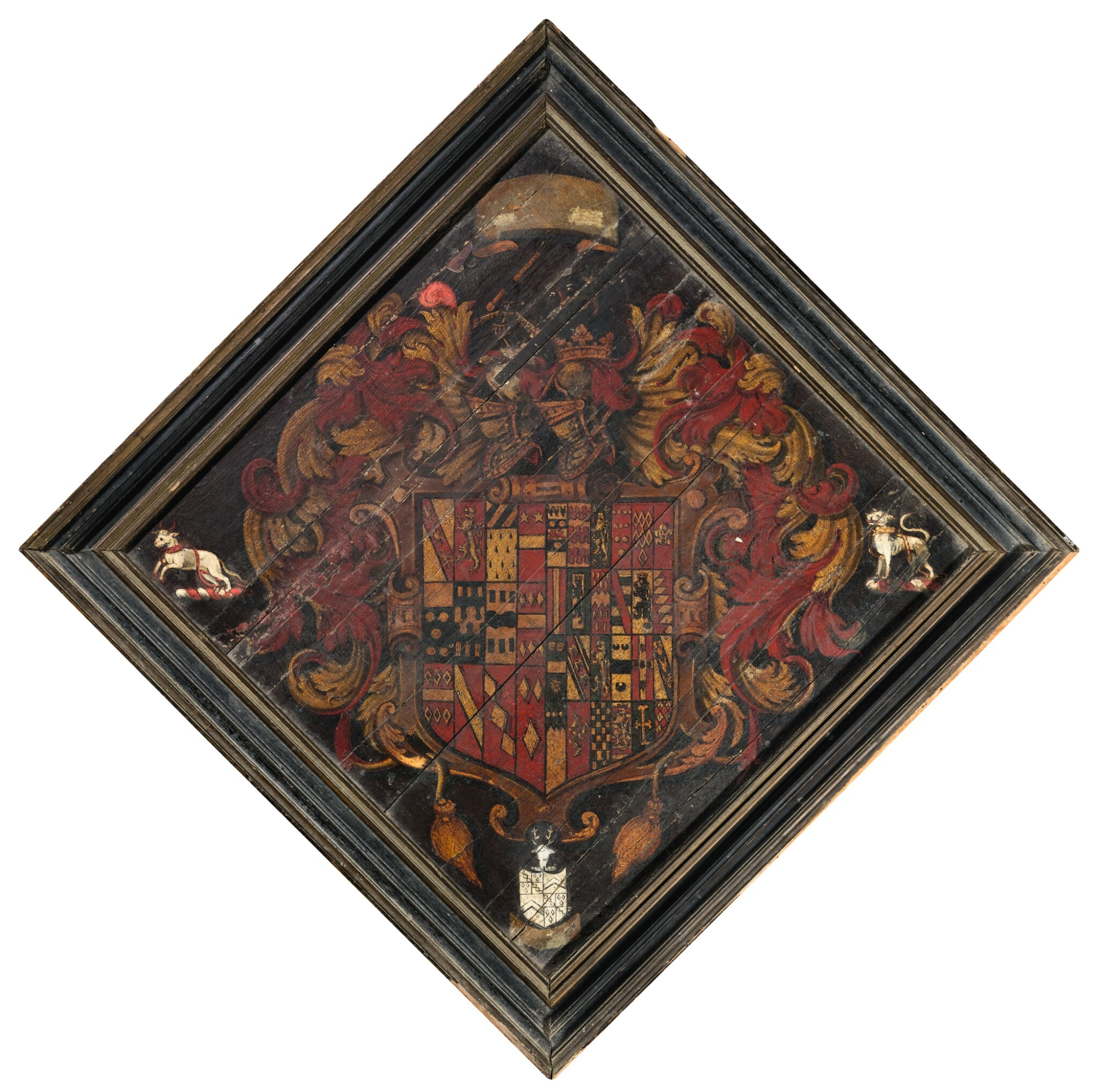
Thomas Habington's funerary hatchment, 1647

Sir Thomas Habington or Abington (1560–1647) was a Catholic English antiquary. He is particularly remembered as an early county historian of Worcestershire, although little of his work was published in his lifetime.

== Life ==
Thomas Habington was the second son of John Habington, cofferer to Queen Elizabeth and Catherine Wykes, the daughter of William Wykes of Moreton Jefferies, Herefordshire. He was born at Thorpe, Surrey, and Elizabeth I was his godmother. His stepmother was Elizabeth's courtier Dorothy Bradbelt. In 1563 his father bought the manor of Hindlip, Worcestershire and built a new house Hindlip Hall, where the family took up residence in time to entertain the queen on her progress to Worcestershire in 1575. He entered Lincoln College, Oxford shortly after. He spent a short time at the English College in Rheims before being summoned home in 1581 on the death of his father. He entered Gray's Inn the following summer.

In 1586 his elder brother Edward Habington became embroiled in the Babington Plot to effect the escape of Mary, Queen of Scots and was executed for treason. Thomas and their younger brother Richard were arrested for suspected complicity and held for six years in the Tower of London. Thomas was noted in a list of prisoners as "a dangerous fellowe, but no dyrect proof against him for this cause, but a dealer with these seminarye priests". On his release he was held for a while in Worcester, but eventually allowed to reside at Hindlip. Around 1593 he married Mary Parker, the daughter of Edward, Lord Morley and his wife Elizabeth, the daughter of William, Lord Monteagle. They had five children, including the poet William Habington.

In the aftermath of the Gunpowder Plot he gave asylum to the Jesuits, Henry Garnett, Edward Oldcorne, Nicholas Owen and Ralph Ashley. They were discovered in priest holes at Hindlip in January 1606. Habington and the other prisoners were taken to London. He was put in the Fleet Prison and then Newgate. After questioning, Habington and the others left London for Worcester Gaol on 21 March 1606 and were put on trial in April. Habington was condemned to death at Worcester Lent Assizes on 4 April, but through the intervention of his brother-in-law, Lord Monteagle, the sentence was commuted. From the eighteenth century it has been reported that Habington was confined to Worcestershire after his pardon, but this is not true. However, he did live largely retired from public life, working on a parish by parish history of Worcestershire. On his death in 1647 he was buried in the family vault at Hindlip.

== Works ==
The only work published by Habington in his lifetime was the first English translation of Gildas's De Excidio et Conquestu Britanniae, which he completed during his imprisonment in the Tower.

He was reputed to have also begun a history of Edward IV during his imprisonment, which was completed and published in 1640 by his son William Habington.

In the 1630s Habington began to correspond with the Warwickshire antiquary Sir Simon Archer and it was anticipated that he would produce a history of Worcestershire. His treatise The Antiquities of the Cathedral Church of Worcester was published in 1717. His parish accounts were utilised by Treadway Russell Nash for his Collections for the History of Worcestershire (1781–82). In the nineteenth century his selections from his manuscripts were edited as A Survey of Worcestershire (2 volumes, 1895–99). His manuscripts are preserved in the library of the Society of Antiquaries of London.
