= Hallow, Worcestershire =

Village in Worcestershire, England

Coordinates: 52.221°N 2.253°W

Hallow
- St Philip & St James Church, Hallow

- Location within Worcestershire
- Population: 1,428 (2021)
- OS grid reference: SO8257
- Civil parish: Hallow
- District: Malvern Hills
- Shire county: Worcestershire
- Region: West Midlands
- Country: England
- Sovereign state: United Kingdom
- Post town: WORCESTER
- Postcode district: WR2
- Dialling code: 01905
- Police: West Mercia
- Fire: Hereford and Worcester
- Ambulance: West Midlands
- UK Parliament: West Worcestershire
- Website: Welcome to Hallow Parish Council

Hallow is a village and civil parish in the Malvern Hills district, in the county of Worcestershire, England. The village is on the A443 road that links Worcester with Holt Heath and is beside the River Severn, about 2 miles (3.2 km) north-west of Worcester. Hallow has a public house, a post office and a Church of England primary school. In 2021 the parish had a population of 1,428.

== History ==
=== Prehistory ===
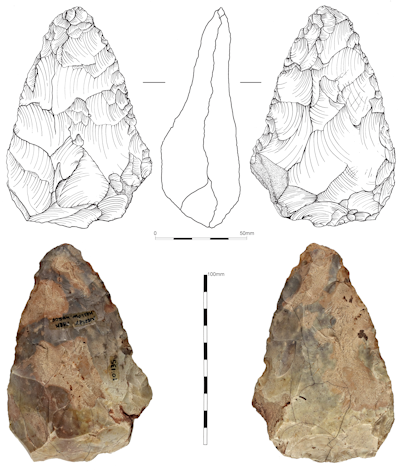
The hand axe discovered in 1970s in Hallow. Potentially the first Early Middle Palaeolithic artefact from the West Midlands.

There is evidence of human presence from the Paleolithic period, roughly 700,000-500,000 years ago. Flint axe heads were found near Hallow in the 1970s.

=== Toponym ===
The name Hallow derives from the Old English halhhaga meaning 'nook of land by a hedge'.

In the 9th century the toponym was recorded as Halhegan, Heallingan and Halnegan. In the 11th century it was recorded as Halhegan and Hallhagan, while in the 13th century it was Hallawe, Hallaye or Hallag.

On 30 September 1885 the civil parish of "Hallow" was abolished and split with the rural part forming "North Hallow" and the part in the County Borough of Worcester forming "South Hallow". On 28 July 1952 "North Hallow" was renamed "Hallow".

=== Manor ===
The earliest record of the manor of Hallow is from AD 816, during the reign of Coenwulf of Mercia, when Hallow evidently belonged to Worcester Cathedral, and by the 10th century Hallow belonged to the Benedictine priory attached to the cathedral. After the Dissolution of the Monasteries around 1540 the cathedral retained Hallow, and in 1913 the manor was vested in the Ecclesiastical Commissioners.

By the middle of the 11th century, Worcester Priory had fishponds at Hallow and in 1256 permission was granted for a warren as well. Both were still in use in 1346.

The Domesday Book of 1086 records that Hallow had two mills for grinding grain; presumably watermills on the River Severn. Hallow Mill was still in use in 1913.

Queen Elizabeth I came to hunt deer with bow and arrow at Hallow Park on 18 August 1575. She was said to have praised the "dainty situation" of the manor house, on high ground and perfumed by mint. In October 1576, she granted John Habington of Hindlip and his wife Dorothy a lease of the manor of Hallow in return for supplying flour to bake manchet bread whenever she returned to Worcestershire.

Following the Poor Law Amendment Act 1834 Grimley Parish, of which Hallow was then part, ceased to be responsible for maintaining the poor in its parish. This responsibility was transferred to Martley Poor Law Union.

=== Parish church ===
Until 1876 Hallow was a chapelry of Grimley. Hallow's original chapel of ease was demolished in 1830 and replaced by a modest Georgian chapel on a new site about 300 yards (270 m) south-east of the old one.

In 1867 the second chapel was demolished and building began of the present Church of England parish church of Saint Philip and Saint James. It was designed by W. J. Hopkins and completed in 1869. Hallow was made a separate parish in 1876. The bell tower with its 150 feet (46 m) high broach spire were added in 1879.

The church is W. J. Hopkins' most notable work. The nave and clerestory are of four bays and are flanked by north and south aisles. The clerestory is supported by flying buttresses and, like a number of Hopkins' works, has round windows. The chancel and its arch are impressively high. 17th- and 18th-century memorial tablets from the old chapel were preserved and are mounted in the new church.

The old chapel had three bells in 1552 and five in 1740. A 16th-century bell from the old chapel hung in the new church until 1900, when a new peal of eight bells cast by John Taylor & Co of Loughborough was hung in the tower.

== Notable people ==
Colonel William Careless, who preserved the life of Charles II by hiding him in the Royal Oak (1651), was resident in Hallow during the 1680s.

The manufacturer and philanthropist William Morris (1877–1963), the future Viscount Nuffield, was born in Hallow and baptised at SS Philip and James.

The diplomat, archeologist, explorer and historian Stewart Perowne was born in Hallow in 1901.

The distinguished physician Sir Charles Bell (1774–1842) died in Hallow en route from Edinburgh to London and is buried in the churchyard.

== Sources ==
- Pevsner, Nikolaus (1968). The Buildings of England: Worcestershire. Harmondsworth: Penguin Books.
- Victoria County History: A History of the County of Worcester: Volume 3. Archibald Constable & Co. 1913. pp. 367–372.
- Russell, O; Daffern, N; Hancox, E; Nash, A (2018). "Putting the Palaeolithic into Worcestershire's HER: An evidence base for development management". Internet Archaeology. 47 (47). doi:10.11141/ia.47.3.
