= Dorothy Lawson (recusant) =

English noblewoman and recusant

- Known for: recusancy, harbouring Catholic priests
- Born: c. 1580; Wing, Buckinghamshire, England
- Died: 26 March 1632; St Antony's, Newcastle-on-Tyne, England
- Buried: All Saints' Church, Newcastle-on-Tyne, England
- Spouse: Sir Roger Lawson (m. 1597)
- Father: Sir Henry Constable
- Mother: Margaret Dormer

Dorothy Lawson (née Constable, 1580–26 March 1632) was an English noblewoman, recusant and harbourer of Catholic priests.

== Early life ==
Dorothy was born in 1580 in Wing, Buckinghamshire, her maternal grandfather's home. Her parents' own home was Burton Constable Hall in East Yorkshire. Her father was Sir Henry Constable (c.1559–1608), Justice of the Peace and Knight of the Shire for Yorkshire. Her mother was Margaret (died 1637), the daughter of Sir William Dormer of Eythrope and his second wife Dorothy, née Catesby. She was brought up as a pious Roman Catholic.

== Marriage ==
She married Sir Roger Lawson of Brough, Yorkshire in 1597, when she was 17 years old. His parents were Sir Ralph Lawson of the Manor of Byker and Elizabeth, née Brough of Brough Hall, near Catterick, North Yorkshire. Her husband's family outwardly conformed to the Church of England but his mother had previously been imprisoned as a recusant. After her marriage and moving into the Lawson household, she contacted Richard Holtby, a Jesuit priest, to arrange monthly visits so that mass could be conducted by a Catholic priest.

In 1605, the Lawson family moved to Heaton Hall, Northumberland. Lawson was able to appoint a room in the home as a private oratory, with conveniences for the priests that she would smuggle in at night.

== Widowhood ==
Her husband died in 1614. After her father in law sold Heaton Hall, with her permission, Lawson built the "quasi-religious" home of St. Anthony’s near Walker, Newcastle-on-Tyne, naming each room after a saint. She had the name of Jesus painted in large letters upon the house to signal to that the household was a Catholic haven.

Lawson became a powerful widow who utilised her autonomy, financial independence and social status to harbour priests at St. Anthony's. She also employed Catholic servants, held religious services for the local community including clandestine Mass, and visited other Catholic recusants who were imprisoned in jail for their beliefs. She dispensed charity to local Catholic families, including comforting women during childbirth and baptising new-born babies if they were in danger of death.

The Jesuit priest William Palmes became Lawson's personal chaplain and confessor for seven years at the end of her life. He wrote a biography of her life, calling her "once my spirituall child, but now I hope my zealous advocate". He wrote that the she was a patroness of the Society of Jesus, who met yearly at her home to discuss the mission in England, and that she chose not to remarry as "she intended to expend the rest of her life like a solitary sparrow in the holes of a rock, or morning turtle, that never had mate but one, and vow'd never to know another."

She died on 26 March 1632. Her funeral was conducted at All Saints' Church, Newcastle upon Tyne.

== Issue ==
The exact number of children that Lawson and her husband had is unknown, but 14 known children were: Henry, Dorothy, Elizabeth, Edmund, Catherine, Mary, Ralph, George, Margaret, John, Roger, Thomas, James and Anne. They were provided with catechetical instruction and raised in the Catholic faith.

Their daughter Dorothy became an Augustinian canoness at Louvain in 1618, and two other daughters, Margaret and Mary, joined a Benedictine convent in Ghent. Their son Ralph attended a seminary in Douai. Other children married into local Catholic families, with several generations indicted for recusancy or becoming nuns and priests.
