= Edward Parker, 12th Baron Morley =

English peer (c. 1550–1618)

Edward Parker, 12th Baron Morley (c. 1550 – 1618) was an English peer, Lord of Morley, Hingham, Hockering, &c., in Norfolk, the son of Henry Parker, 11th Baron Morley and Lady Elizabeth Stanley. His second daughter was Frances Danby.

The 1607 marriage of his daughter Frances to Christopher Danby was confused. Danby had been promised £1,000 as part of the marriage arrangements. However the £1,000 never arrived and as a result Danby did not live full time with his wife. Three children were born but the couple remained in dispute. Frances was accused of recusancy and, before her death, Danby sent a son away to school with instructions that the son's mother was not to be allowed access.

He was one of the peers who sat in judgment on Mary, Queen of Scots at Fotheringay.

== Marriages and children ==
His first wife was Elizabeth Stanley (daughter of William Stanley, 3rd Baron Monteagle and Anne Leybourne).

His second wife was Gertrude, daughter of Sir Robert Denys of Holcombe Burnell in Devon and widow of John Arundell of Trerice in Cornwall; her will (1635) can be found in the National Archives "Will of Gertrude Morley, Widow of Trerise".

His children included:

- William Parker, 13th Baron Morley (Lord Monteagle of the Gunpowder Plot fame)
- Elizabeth Parker, who married Alexander Barlow (died 1642) of Barlow Hall, a brother of Ambrose Barlow.
- Frances Parker, wife of Christopher Danby of Thorpe Perrow, Yorkshire, and of Farnley, Leeds, West Riding of Yorkshire.
- Mary Parker, who married Thomas Habington a son of John Habington of Hindlip Hall, and was a friend of Anne Vaux.
