= Richard Holtby =

English Jesuit priest

Father Richard Holtby (alias "Andrew Ducket", "Robert North", "Richard Fetherston"; 1553 – 25 May 1640) was an English Jesuit superior and Roman Catholic priest. He constructed priest holes in the north of England.

== Early life ==
Richard was born in Fryton, Yorkshire, England and was the second son of Lancelot Holtby of that place by Ellen (née Butler) of Nunnington, in Ryedale, Yorkshire.

After spending two years at Christ's College, Cambridge, and migrating to Caius College on 19 August 1573, aged 20, he removed to Oxford, where in 1574 he joined Hart Hall, the principal of which, Philip Rondell, was a papist, "but durst not show it".

== Religious education ==
Richard taught at Oxford University as well as Cambridge University, where he tutored the future "seminary priest" Alexander Briant. Leaving Oxford without a degree, Holtby proceeded to the English College at DouaI where he arrived by way of Antwerp, in August 1577, and was received into the Roman Catholic Church. He was ordained priest at Cambrai on 29 March 1578. The college was relocated to Reims, where Holtby continued his theological studies until February 1579, when he was sent on the English mission. He returned to England, probably on a merchant ship belonging to the Hodgsons of Hebburn. The Hodgsons regularly gave passage to priests from the continent to Shields, Hebburn, and Newcastle. After resting at Hebburn Hall they were passed on to other "safe houses" in the North. Holtby was a capable gardner, mason, and carpenter. A skilled mechanic, he constructed many cleverly contrived hiding-places for the persecuted priests. He could also ply the needle to make vestments and altar-cloths.

In 1581, Father Edmund Campion paid him a visit, and while staying in his house composed the famous Decem Rationes and urged him to join the Society of Jesus. Richard entered the Society of Jesus in 1583 and crossed the English Channel to participate in his Spiritual Exercises with Father Thomas Derbyshire. He fulfilled the requirements of his noviceship at Verdun and continued on to Pont-à-Mousson to continue his studies. There he was one of three out of thirteen contemporaries who survived the black plague. After four years spent studying theology at the University of Pont-à-Mousson, he was appointed superior of the Scots College there, in about 1587.

== Mission in England ==
The father-general, Aquaviva, sent him back to England in 1589. From 1593 to about 1605, Holtby worked in the northern counties. Much of that time he spent in the house of John Trollope in Thornley, Durham. . On one occasion, Holtby and his host's eldest son were returning from a baptism at some distance, when they saw that the house was being searched. As they had been observed by the pursuivants, they had to flee on foot and hide in the woods for two days. He is also known to have arranged monthly visits, so that mass could be conducted by a Catholic priest, for recusant noblewoman and Catholic priest harbourer Dorothy Lawson.

In 1603 he was professed of the four vows. After the execution of Father Henry Garnett he was appointed superior or vice-prefect of the English mission, and during his three years’ tenure of that office he appears to have resided in London. When the question of the new oath of allegiance to James I was proposed, and the archpriest George Blackwell declared that it might be conscientiously taken by Catholics, Holtby at first forbade the Jesuits to write or preach against the oath, while leaving them free to give private advice on the subject; but after the condemnation of the oath by Pope Paul V he denounced it.

== Later life and death ==
On vacating his office he returned to the north of England, where he exercised much influence among the Catholics. A government spy in a report to the privy council in 1593 describes him as "a little man, with a reddish bearde", and adds that he chiefly resided at Mr. Trollope's house at Thornley, co. Durham. In order to evade arrest he assumed the aliases of Andrew Ducket, Robert North, and Richard Fetherston. One of his bases was Harbour House Farm near Chester-le-Street owned by the Forcer family.

In 1602–3 he was at Heborne, the residence of Mr Hodgson, three miles from Newcastle; and in 1605–6 he was at Halton, Northumberland, the seat of Lancelot Carnaby. He died in the Durham district on 14 May (O.S.) 1640. "Of no other English Jesuit", remarks Augustus Jessopp, "can it be said that he exercised his vocation in England for upwards of fifty years, and that, too, with extraordinary effect and ceaseless activity, without once being thrown into gaol or once falling into the hands of pursuivants; and quietly died in his bed in extreme old age."

Richard died in England on 25 May 1640, aged 87.

== His works ==
- On the Persecution in the North, 1594 manuscript at Stonyhurst College, printed by John Morris in Troubles of our Catholic Forefathers, iii. 103-219, and partially printed in Dodd’s Catholic History,’ ed. Tierney, iii. 75-148.
- Account of Three Martyrs (namely Page, Lambton, and Waterson, priests), manuscript at Stonyhurst College; printed by Morris in ‘Troubles of our Catholic Forefathers,’ iii. 220-30.

== See also ==
- Nicholas Owen (Jesuit)
- Priest hole

== Notes ==
Catholic Church titles
Preceded by Henry Garnet	Vice-Prefect of the English Mission of the Society of Jesus residing in England; 1606-1609	Succeeded by Robert Jones
