= The Old Palace, Worcester =

Historic building in Worcester, England

Diocese of Worcester
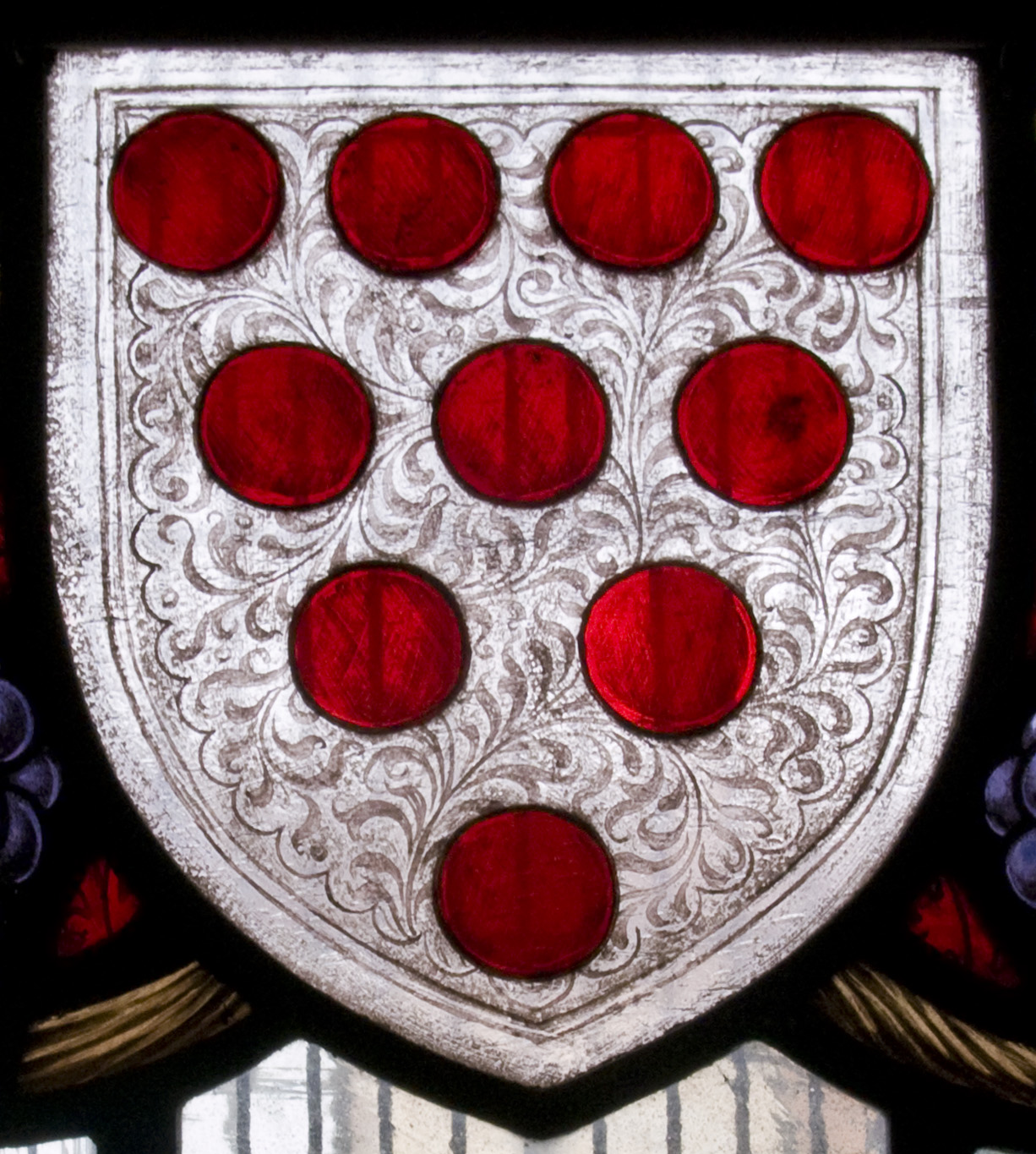

Location
- Ecclesiastical province: Canterbury
- Archdeaconries: Dudley, Worcester
- Coordinates: 52.192°N 2.224°W

Statistics
- Parishes: 180
- Churches: 284

Information
- Cathedral: Worcester Cathedral

Current leadership
- Bishop: John Inge, Bishop of Worcester
- Suffragan: Martin Gorick, Bishop of Dudley
- Archdeacons: Nikki Groarke, Archdeaconry of Dudley; Robert Jones, Archdeacon of Worcester

Website
- cofe-worcester.org.uk

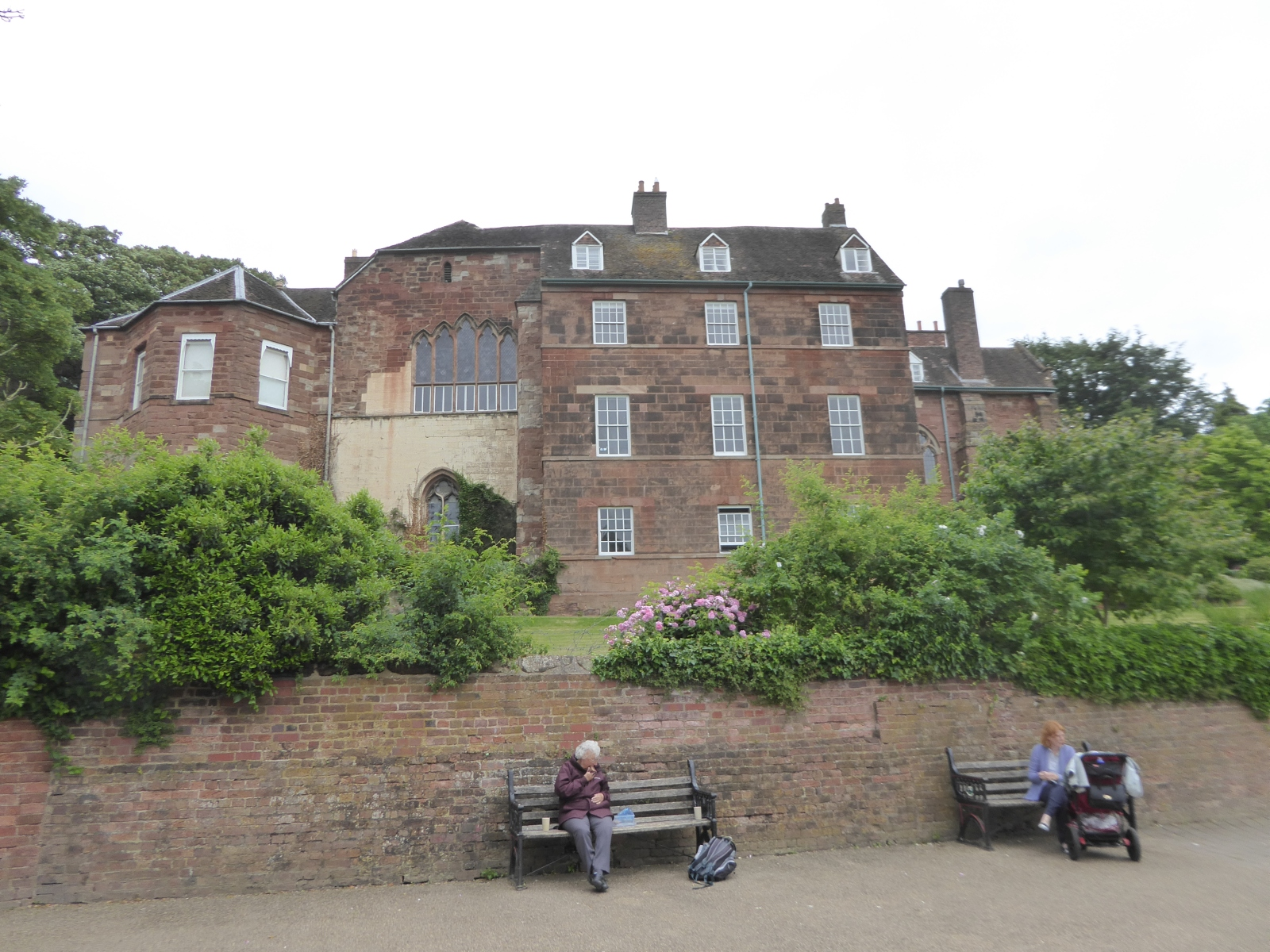
The Old Palace

The Old Palace, Worcester is an English listed historic building, built c.1200, adjacent to Worcester Cathedral in the Church of England Diocese of Worcester, which is within the Province of Canterbury.

== History ==
The old palace was built for the Bishop of Worcester, Bishop Mauger, in c. 1200 during the reign of King John. Queen Elizabeth I and her council stayed at the palace in August 1575. She visited Hindlip Hall and hunted deer in Hallow Park.

During the English Civil War it was the venue for a council of war at which the Governor of Worcester, Colonel Henry Washington, refused to surrender to the parliamentary forces, leading to the Siege of Worcester in June 1646. King James II stayed for three nights in 1687: during his stay he so upset the then Bishop of Worcester, William Thomas, that the City of Worcester failed to support James II during the Glorious Revolution in 1688.

King George III stayed at the palace with members of his family in 1788: it was subsequently identified as the place to which Queen Charlotte would flee in the event of a French invasion of the United Kingdom in the late 18th century.

The building remained the official residence of the Bishop of Worcester until 1846 when the Church Commissioners sold it to the Dean and Chapter of Worcester Cathedral for use as a deanery.
