= William Parker, 4th Baron Monteagle =

English peer, discoverer of the Gunpowder Plot (1575–1622)

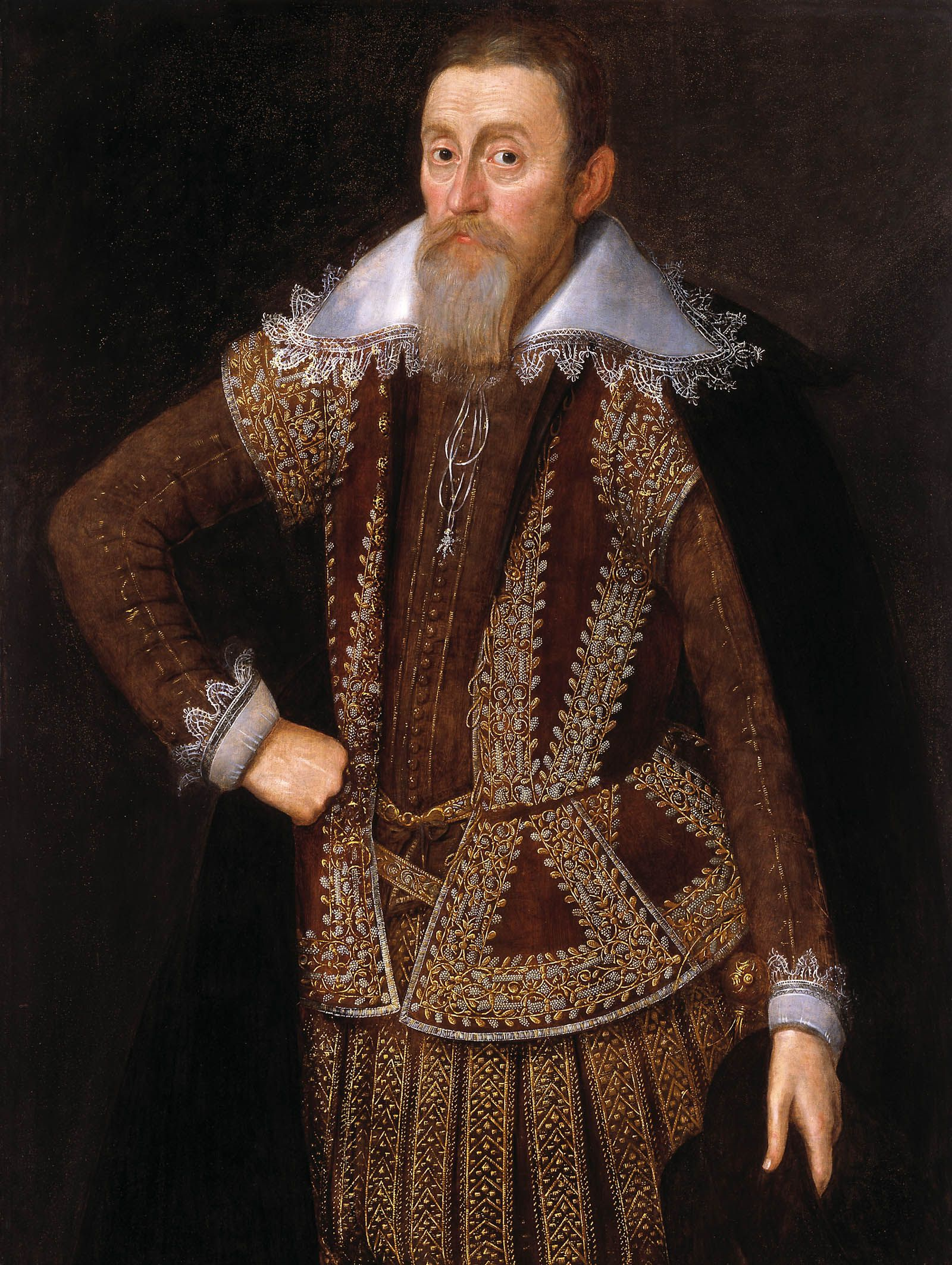
Parker. Attributed to John de Critz, c. 1615.

William Parker, 13th Baron Morley, 4th Baron Monteagle (1575 – 1 July 1622), was an English peer, best known for his role in the discovery of the Gunpowder Plot. In 1605 Parker was due to attend the opening of Parliament. He was a member of the House of Lords as Lord Monteagle, the title on his mother's side. He received a letter; it appears that someone, presumably a fellow Catholic, was afraid he would be blown up. The so-called Monteagle letter survives in the National Archives (SP 14/216/2), but its origin remains mysterious.

== Early life ==
William was the eldest son of Edward Parker, 12th Baron Morley (died 1618), and of Elizabeth Stanley, daughter and heiress of William Stanley, 3rd Baron Monteagle (died 1581). He had both a younger brother, Charles, and a younger sister, Mary.

William's father was a recusant, but appears to have been in favour at court; he was one of the noblemen who tried Mary, Queen of Scots. However, William was allied with many Roman Catholic families, and during the reign of Queen Elizabeth I was in sympathy with their cause. His wife, the daughter of Sir Thomas Tresham, came from a well-known Roman Catholic family. His sister married Thomas Habington, also a Roman Catholic. He was knighted while with Robert Devereux, 2nd Earl of Essex, in Ireland in 1599, and in 1601 he took part in the latter's rebellion in London. He was punished by imprisonment in the Tower and indicted, but successfully appealed to William Cecil to intercede with the Queen on his behalf. He was subsequently released and "reserved for her Majesty's use" after paying a fine of £4,000 (according to Cecil's private papers) or a fine of £8,000. Being "reserved" meant he was not forgiven of his involvement, as some others were, but essentially on parole as were Robert Catesby and Francis Tresham. Also, whilst he was committed to the Tower and wrote to Cecil under the name Lord Monteagle, he was fined under the name Sir William Parker, suggesting he may have been stripped of his right to sit in the Lords as a result of his treason and lost some of his land in Essex, although these were restored when King James pardoned actions prior to his reign.

Having close ties with the extremist Catholic faction during Queen Elizabeth I's rule, and a hand in organising Thomas Winter's mission to Spain in 1602, William Parker later declared to be "done with all formal plots" after King James I took the throne. Monteagle even went as far as writing a letter to his new king with a promise to follow the state religion. Like some reformers, Monteagle blamed his childhood for his previous wrongdoings, stating: "I knew no better." This letter does not have a date and the tone of the letter suggests someone who has enjoyed a longer period of friendship with the King which prompted his conversion referring as it does to "Your majesty’s tender and fatherly love over me in admonishing me heartofore, to seek resolution In matter of religion". It would also seem that he was specifically rejecting the Papacy and becoming an Anglo-Catholic, like the Earl of Northampton, rather than wholly adopting the Protestant faith, which would then make his subsequent actions with respect to the Catholic community more understandable.

== Gunpowder Plot ==
=== Background ===
When King James I began his reign, English Catholics had hoped that the persecution felt for over 45 years under his predecessor Queen Elizabeth would finally end. Though more tolerant than others before him, James was still faced with plots and schemes by priests and rebels trying to end the mistreatment of Catholics through force (Fraser 63). To please the Protestants, who were distressed over the growing strength of the Catholic religion, James proclaimed his detestation of Catholics in England. Once again priests were expelled, fines were taxed, and Catholics went back to living a hidden life, but some Catholics were not so accepting of the secretive nature in which they had to practise their faith.

In 1604 Robert Catesby, a devout Catholic with a magnetic personality, recruited friends and rebels to meet and discuss his plot to blow up the House of Lords in an attempt to reestablish Catholicism in England. Those present at that first meeting with Catesby were Thomas Wintour, John Wright, Thomas Percy and Guy Fawkes. With the imminent threat of plague, Parliament postponed re-opening until 5 November 1605, which gave the plotters ample time to lease out a small house in the centre of London where Fawkes would live under the alias "John Johnson" as Thomas Percy's servant while gathering the gunpowder necessary (Fraser 174). By March 1605, the 36 barrels of gunpowder were moved to the newly leased out cellar directly under the House of Lords.

On 26 October an anonymous letter warned Lord Monteagle to avoid the opening of Parliament. This letter was possibly sent by Monteagle's brother-in-law, Francis Tresham. In any event, it caused enough suspicion that on the night of 4 November the undercroft beneath the House of Lords was searched by guards, where Guy Fawkes was found in possession of matches and gunpowder was found hidden under coal. After intense torture in the Tower of London Fawkes gave his true name and those of his fellow conspirators. All but one of the plotters pleaded not guilty but nevertheless the seven were found guilty of high treason and each was executed on 30 and 31 January.

=== The Monteagle letter ===
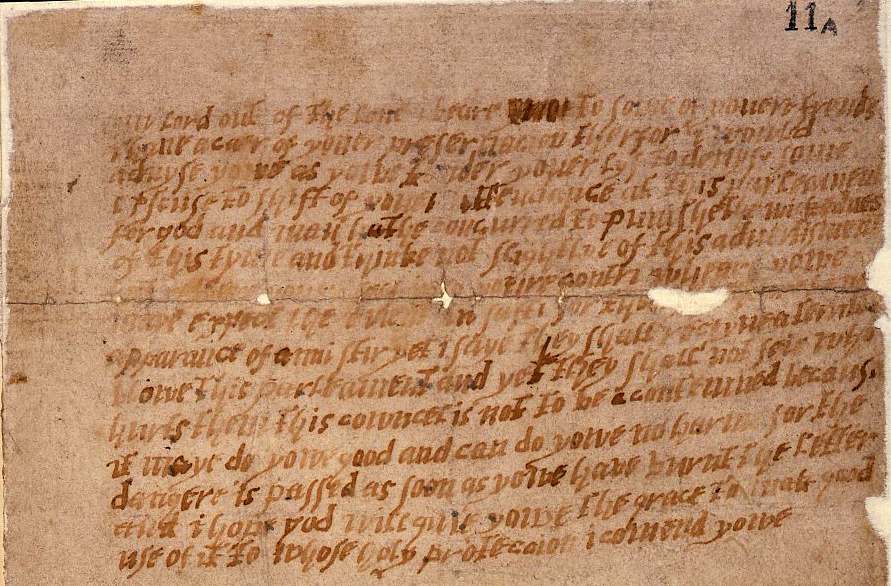
The original Monteagle letter, now in the UK's government archives

On 26 October 1605, while sitting at supper at his house in Hoxton, London, he received a letter warning of the Gunpowder Plot. It read as follows:

Early Modern English

My lord, out of the love I beare to some of youere frends, I have a care of youre preservacion, therefore I would aduyse you as you tender your life to devise some excuse to shift youer attendance at this parliament, for God and man hath concurred to punishe the wickedness of this tyme, and thinke not slightly of this advertisement, but retire yourself into your country, where you may expect the event in safety, for though there be no apparance of anni stir, yet I saye they shall receive a terrible blow this parliament and yet they shall not seie who hurts them this cowncel is not to be contemned because it may do yowe good and can do yowe no harme for the dangere is passed as soon as yowe have burnt the letter and i hope God will give yowe the grace to mak good use of it to whose holy proteccion i comend yowe.

Translation:

Present-day English

My lord, out of the love I have for some of your friends, I want to make sure you are safe. Because of this I would advise you to not attend this sitting of parliament because God and man have agreed to punish the wickedness of this time. Do not think this is a joke, go to your estate in the country where you will be safe, because although there is no sign of any problem yet, this parliament will receive a terrible blow, but they will not see who it is that hurts them. This advice should not be ignored as it may do you some good, and it can do you no harm because the danger will have passed as soon as you have burned this letter. I hope God grants you the grace to make good use of it, and that he protects you.

It is believed by some historians that he wrote the letter himself to win acclaim and favour with the King. The historians in question are likely biased against him having Catholic sympathies or actually being a later 19th century Jesuit historian. Fraser posits that the note was from someone who wanted to protect Monteagle (either his family, such as his sister Mary Habington, or a friendly conspirator). Had it been a conspirator, such as Francis Tresham, the writer would also have intended to end the plot before it began; Monteagle had been too clear in his politics to assume he would remain quiet about the plot. The argument against Mary Habington having sent the letter is that the letter was too clumsy, and that there were far better ways to discreetly deliver the information, had it come from her. As for a conspirator, Monteagle benefited too richly—and the conspirators too terribly—for that to be the case. Initially Thomas Wintour's confession suggested that Monteagle had sent warning to him, Catesby and Tresham about the letter and that he was taking it to Cecil. His name was removed from the official account, leaving just an anonymous person giving the warning, and yet the contemporary Jesuit account of the plot suggested it was his servant who brought them the warning, without saying he was authorised to do so by Monteagle. It seems somewhat suspicious that the author of the Jesuit account knew of this information when it had never been made public and the plotters were very careful not to talk to anyone outside their own circle prior to the discovery and even tried to maintain ignorance of the gunpowder element initially after their arrest. According to the Jesuit history they received two more warnings on Saturday, 2 November (that the King had taken the letter very seriously) and Sunday, 3 November (that it was being handled with great secrecy), yet they still did not abandon their scheme and flee to the Continent as suggested. The Jesuit history also imparts the information that when Thomas Wintour told this to Francis Tresham on the Sunday, he seemed to be "a man who had lost control of himself" and insisted "without a doubt, the plot was discovered". This would suggest that probably the letter was something devised by Monteagle after receiving a verbal warning from Tresham, without necessarily knowing what the word "blow" really meant, and was trying very hard both to prevent the carnage (thinking it was a warning of a violent insurrection) and save his former friends from the consequences of their own infamy. He knew Catesby and Wintour well enough to deduce that if a rebellion was planned, they were likely part of it or may be he got Tresham to admit as much to him.

After deciphering the letter, Monteagle rushed to Whitehall and showed it to Robert Cecil, 1st Earl of Salisbury, who then showed it to the King. On 4 November, Monteagle joined the Earl of Suffolk in searching the basement of Parliament, where they found the stash of gunpowder and explosives. For his service in protecting the crown, Monteagle was rewarded with 500 pounds and 200 pounds' worth of lands.

Several other Catholic members of Parliament were absent on the planned day of the attack but Monteagle was the only member of Parliament who was confirmed to have received a letter warning of the plot.

== Later life and death ==
In 1609, Parker invested in the second Virginia Company and became a member of the council. He had shares in the East India and North West Companies as well. Parker used his influence to protect his brother-in-law, Thomas Habington, from the possible consequence of death, after harbouring the forbidden priests at Hindlip. Although Habington was condemned, his wife's pleas to her brother secured his reprieve. Despite revealing the Gunpowder Plot, Parker seems to have retained some connections to the Catholic community. His eldest son of six children, Henry Lord Morley, was also a known Catholic and in 1609, he was suspected of sheltering students from St. Omer's seminary. Monteagle gave permission for his eldest daughter Frances Parker to become a nun, although not willing, at first, to grant her request. He eventually surrendered to his physically handicapped daughter's appeal "in respect that she was crooked, and therefore not fit for the world."

By his marriage with Elizabeth Tresham, daughter of Sir Thomas Tresham, he had six children: three sons and three daughters. The eldest son, Henry, succeeded him as 14th Baron Morley and 5th Baron Monteagle. These baronies fell into abeyance when Henry's son Thomas died in about 1686. His eldest daughter, Frances, was a nun; the second, Catherine, married John Savage, 2nd Earl Rivers; and the youngest, Elizabeth, married Edward Cranfield, and was the mother of Edward Cranfield. Through Catherine, he was the 5× great-grandfather of Alfred, Lord Tennyson.

Parker was summoned to parliament as Baron Morley and Baron Monteagle in 1618 after the death of his father. He died on 1 July 1622 at Great Hallingbury in Essex and was reported to have received the last rites of the Roman Catholic Church before his death.

Peerage of England
Preceded by William Stanley	Baron Monteagle; 1581–1622	Succeeded by Henry Parker
