= Nicholas Owen (Jesuit) =

English Catholic martyr

Saint Nicholas Owen SJ
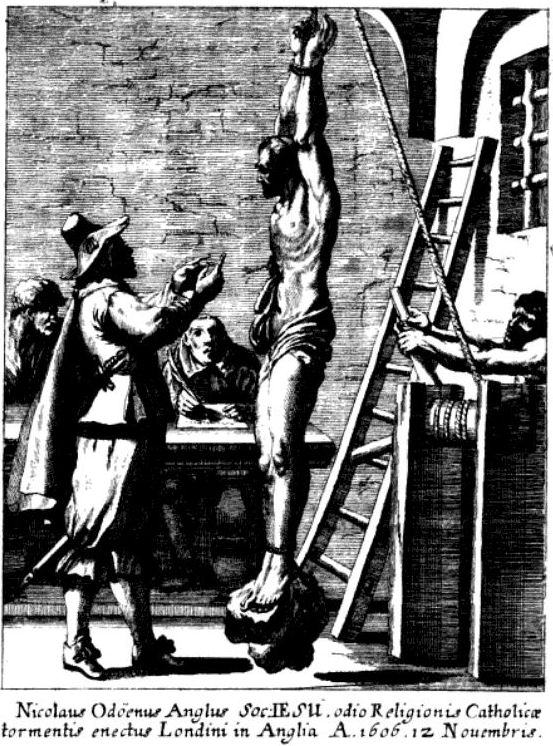
- The torture of Saint Nicholas Owen, S.J. an engraving by Melchior Küsel (17th century)

Martyr
- Born: c. 1562; Oxford, England
- Died: 1/2 March 1606 (aged 43 - 44); Tower of London, England
- Venerated in: Catholic Church
- Beatified: 15 December 1929 by Pope Pius XI
- Canonized: 25 October 1970 by Pope Paul VI
- Feast: 22 March (individual); 4 May (Forty Martyrs)

Nicholas Owen, S.J., (c. 1562 – 1/2 March 1606) was an English Jesuit lay brother who was the principal builder of priest holes during the reigns of Queen Elizabeth I and James I of England. Owen built many priest holes in the buildings of English Catholics from 1588 until his final arrest in 1606, when he was tortured to death by prison authorities in the Tower of London. Owen is honoured as a martyr by the Catholic Church and was canonized by Pope Paul VI in 1970.

== Life ==
Nicholas Owen was born around 1562 in Oxford, England, into a devoutly Catholic family and grew up during the Penal Laws. His father, Walter Owen, was a carpenter and Nicholas was apprenticed as a joiner in February 1577, acquiring the skills that he would use to build hiding places. Two of his older brothers became priests.

Owen served as a servant of Edmund Campion, who was arrested by priest hunters in 1581, and was himself arrested for protesting Campion's innocence. Upon his release, he entered the service of Henry Garnet, a Jesuit, around 1588. For the next 18 years, Owen built hiding places for Catholic priests in the homes of Catholic families. He frequently travelled from one house to another under the name of "Little John" and accepted only the necessities of life as payment before he started off for a new project. He also used the aliases "Little Michael", "Andrewes" and "Draper". During the daytime, he would work as a travelling carpenter to deflect suspicion.

Owen was of very short stature, and suffered from a hernia, as well as a crippled leg from a horse falling on him. Sometimes, he built a more easily discovered outer hiding place, which concealed an inner hiding place. The location of the secret room was known to only himself and the owner of the house. One certain example of his work survives, at Broad Oaks Manor and it is extremely likely that Baddesley Clinton is the unidentified house in which seven priests hid in one of his hides during a search in 1591, as the hide and the house match the description perfectly. Probable examples of his work survive at Sawston Hall in Cambridgeshire, Oxburgh Hall in Norfolk, Huddington Court and Harvington Hall in Worcestershire. There is no reason to think the turret hide at Coughton Court in Warwickshire is Owen's work. Due to the ingenuity of his craftsmanship, some may still be undiscovered.

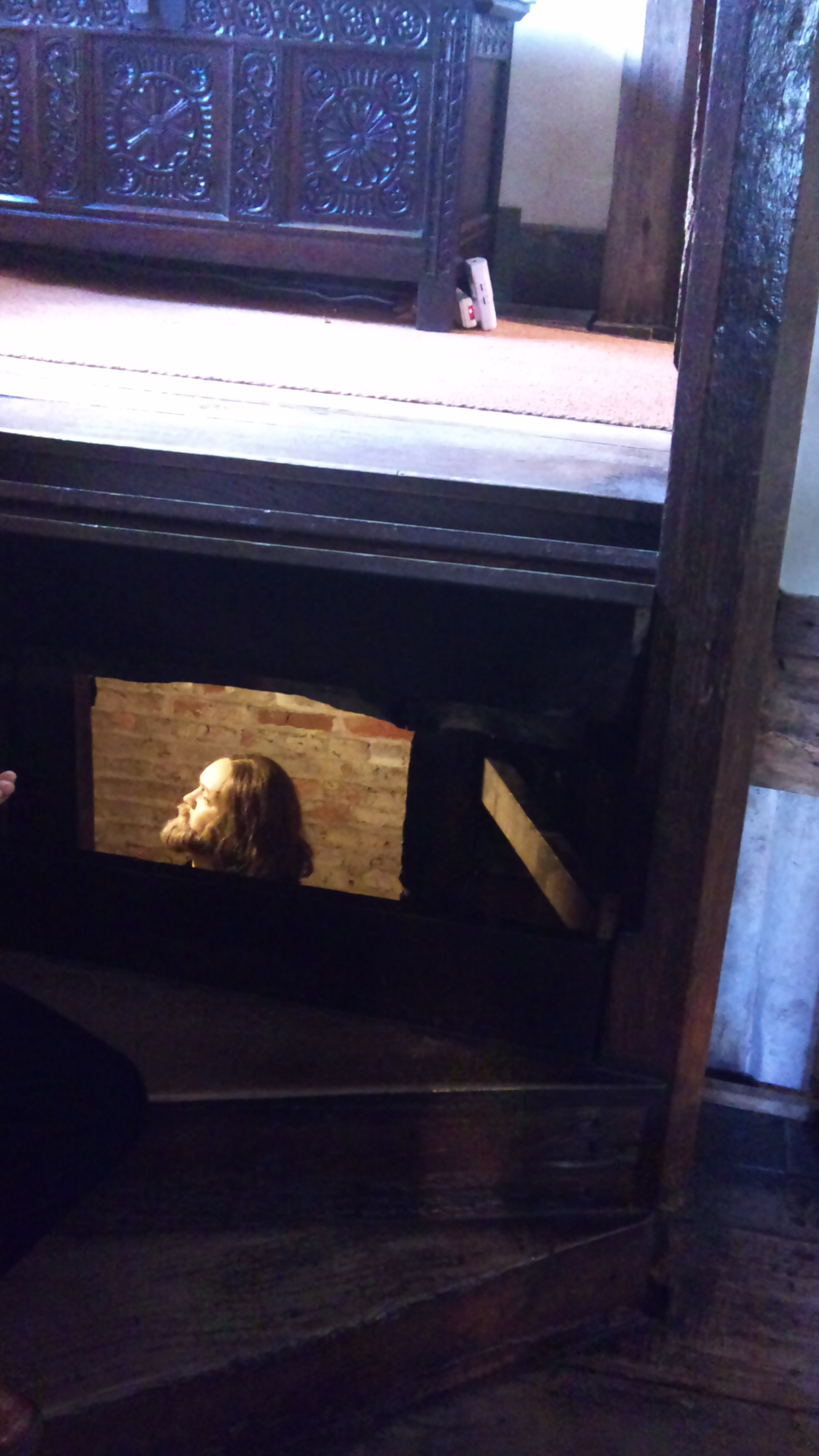
A priest hole in the staircase made by Nicholas Owen in a 16th-century manor-house, Harvington Hall, Worcestershire.

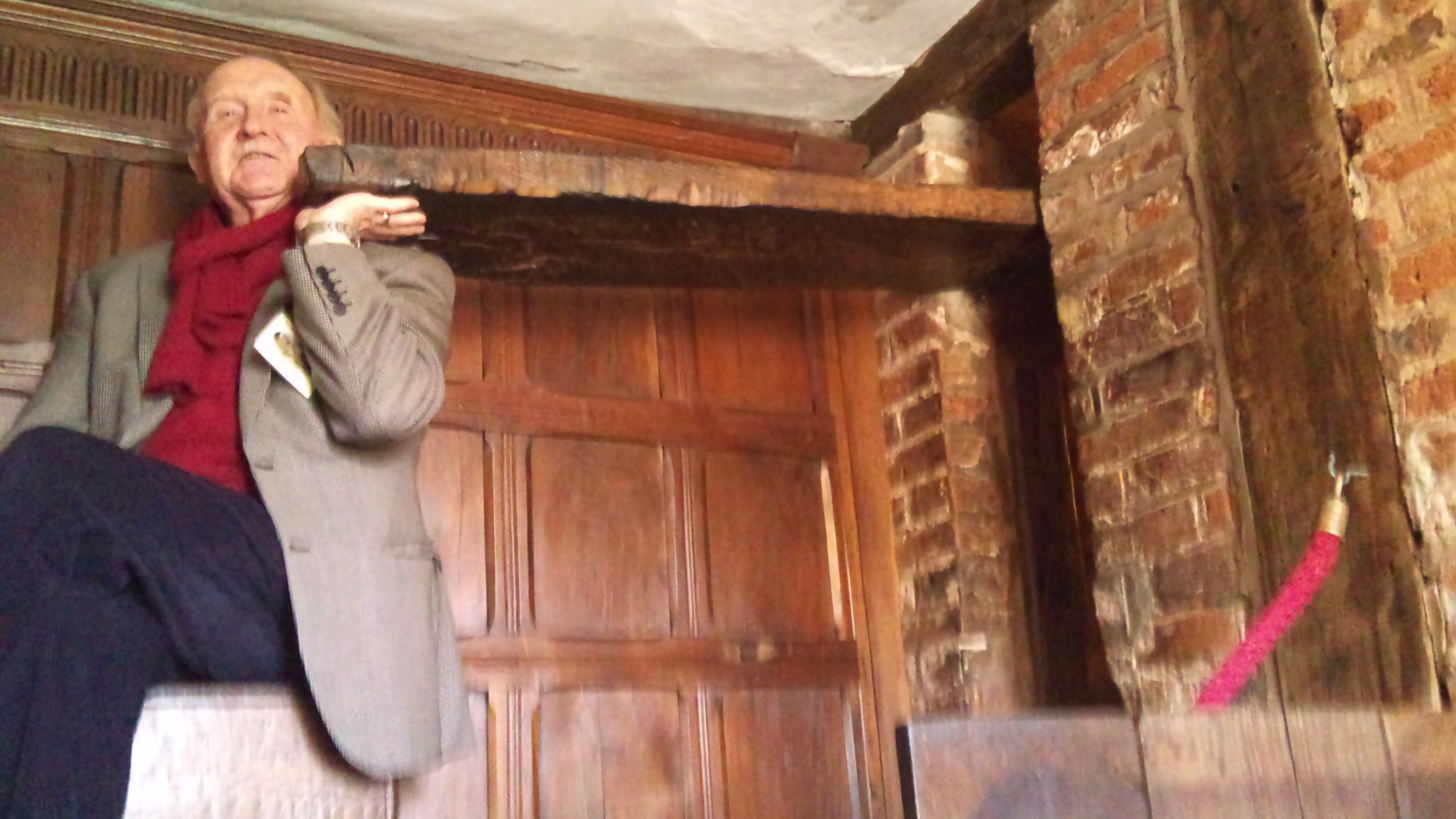
Another priest hole made by Nicholas Owen in the library in Harvington Hall

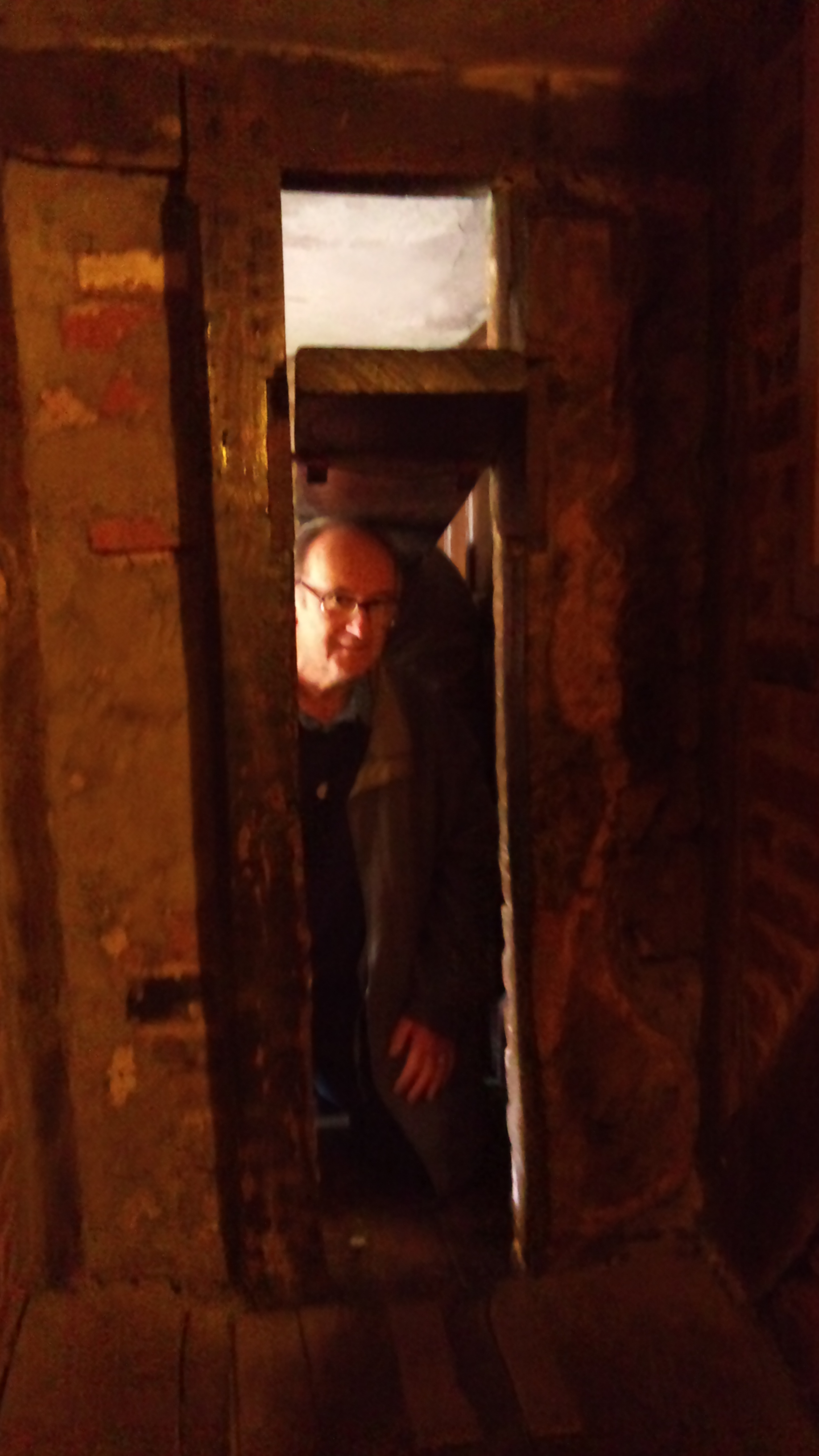
The same priest hole inside.

For many years, Owen worked in the service of the Jesuit priest Henry Garnet and was admitted into the Society of Jesus as a lay brother. He was arrested in 1594 and tortured at the Poultry Compter but revealed nothing. He was released after a wealthy Catholic family paid a fine on his behalf, the jailers believing that he was merely the insignificant friend of some priests. He resumed his work and was involved in the famous escape of John Gerard from the Tower of London in 1597.

In early 1606, Owen was arrested a final time at Hindlip Hall in Worcestershire, starved, with Ralph Ashley, out of one of his own hides after four days, the two having had nothing to eat but an apple. Realising just whom they had caught, and his value, Secretary of State Robert Cecil exulted: "It is incredible, how great was the joy caused by his arrest... knowing the great skill of Owen in constructing hiding places, and the innumerable quantity of dark holes which he had schemed for hiding priests all through England".

== Death ==
After being committed to the Marshalsea, a prison on the southern bank of the Thames, Owen was then removed to the Tower of London. He was submitted to torture on the Topcliffe rack, dangling from a wall with both wrists held fast in iron gauntlets and his body hanging. As his hernia allowed his intestines to bulge out during this procedure, the rack master strapped a circular plate of iron to his stomach. When he remained stubborn, it is believed that he was transferred to the rack, where the greater power of the windlass forced out his hernia, which was then slashed by the plate, resulting in his death. Owen revealed nothing to his inquisitors, and died in the night between 1 and 2 March 1606. Gerard wrote of him:

I verily think no man can be said to have done more good of all those who laboured in the English vineyard. He was the immediate occasion of saving the lives of many hundreds of persons, both ecclesiastical and secular.

== Veneration ==
Owen was canonized as one of the Forty Martyrs of England and Wales by Pope Paul VI on 25 October 1970. Their joint feast day was initially celebrated on the anniversary of the canonization. That feast has been moved in England to 4 May. His individual feast day is on 22 March. Catholic stage magicians who practice Gospel Magic consider St. Nicholas Owen the patron saint of illusionists and escapologists, due to his facility at using trompe-l'œil when creating his hideouts.

There are Catholic churches dedicated to Saint Nicholas Owen in Little Thornton, Lancashire and Burton Latimer, Northamptonshire.

The Catholic school academy company that serves the Kidderminster, Hagley and Stourbridge areas near Harvington Hall is named in his honour.

== Portrayals in fiction ==
- Owen is portrayed, as a minor character, in Robert Hugh Benson's novel Come Rack! Come Rope! (1912), where he is named "Hugh Owen".
- One of his priest holes plays a key role in the Catherine Aird mystery novel A Most Contagious Game (1967). A priest hole attributed to him is also part of Peter Carey's novel Parrot and Olivier in America (2010).
- Owen and his work play a key role in The House of a Hundred Whispers by Graham Masterton, published in 2020 by Head of Zeus Ltd.
- Owen is also a minor character in Leonard Tourney's novel Catesby's Ghost: A Mystery of Shakespeare (2022).
- Owen has a minor role in Botany Manor, published by Whitethorn Games in 2024.

== See also ==
- Priest hole
- Priest hunter
- Richard Holtby
