= Priest hole =

Hiding place for Catholic priests in England or Wales

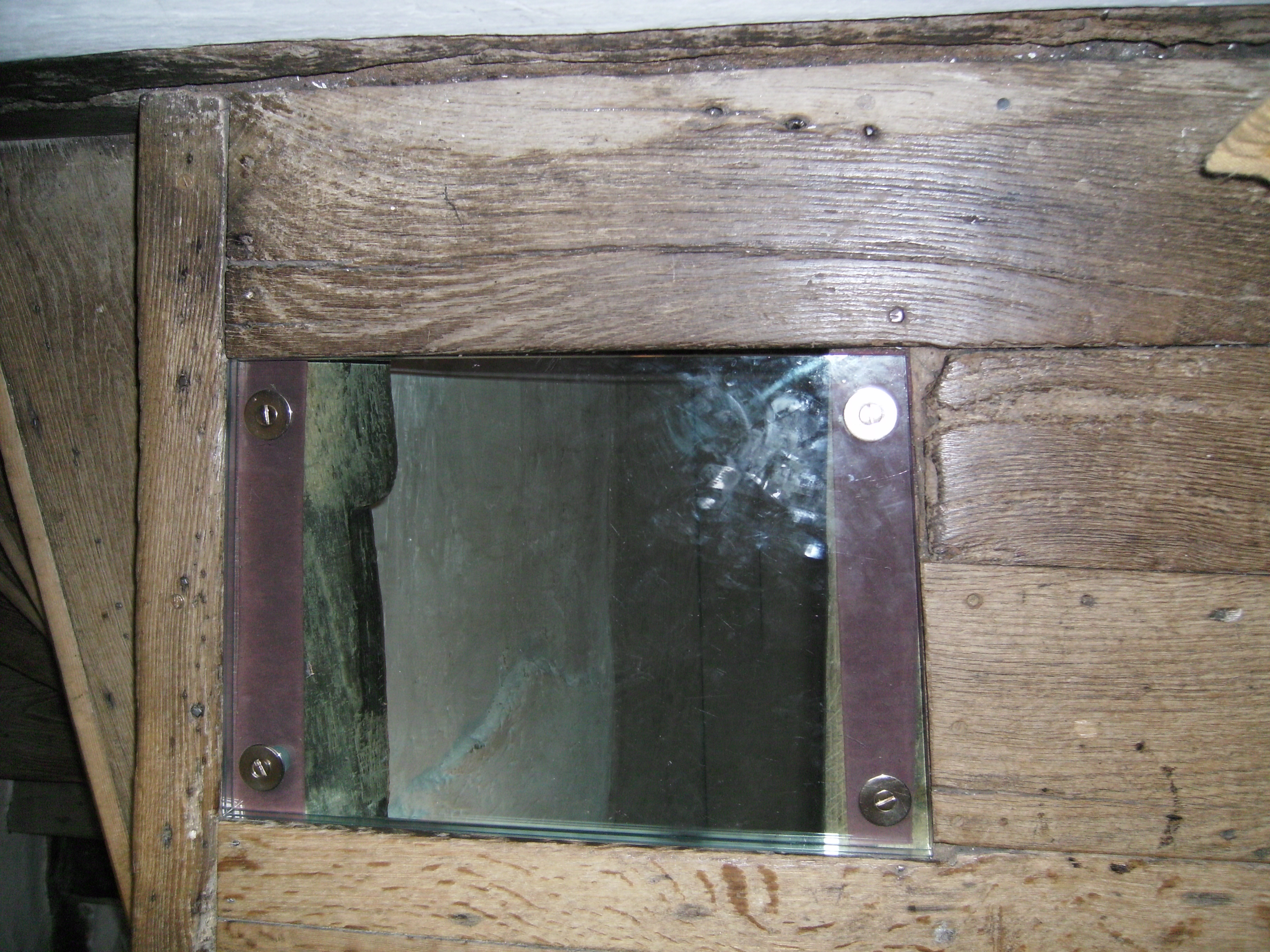
Priest hole on second floor of Boscobel House, Shropshire in which Charles II spent the night 6–7 September 1651.

A priest hole is a hiding place for a priest built in England or Wales during the period when Catholics were persecuted by law. Following the accession of Queen Elizabeth I to the throne in 1558, there were several Catholic plots designed to remove her, and severe measures, including torture and execution, were taken against Catholic priests. From the mid-1570s, hides were built into houses to conceal priests from priest hunters. Most of the hides that survive today are in country manor houses, but there is much documentary evidence, for example in the Autobiography and Narrative of the Gunpowder Plot of John Gerard, of hides in towns and cities, especially in London.

The two best-known hide builders are Jesuit lay brother Nicholas Owen, who worked in the South and the Midlands, and Jesuit priest Richard Holtby, who worked in the North. After the Gunpowder Plot, Owen was captured, taken to the Tower of London, and tortured to death on the rack. He was canonised as a martyr by Pope Paul VI in 1970. Holtby was never arrested, and he died peacefully in 1640.

== Background ==
The legal restrictions on Catholic worship, promulgated shortly after the accession of Queen Elizabeth I, became much harsher as a result of Catholic resistance against her, including the Rising of the North (1569), the Papal Bull Regnans In Excelsis (1570), which excommunicated Elizabeth and released Catholics from their allegiance to her, the return of the first seminary priests in the 1570s, the arrival of the Jesuits from 1580 onwards, and the Throckmorton Plot (1583). A range of increasingly draconian measures culminated in the Jesuits, etc. Act 1584, which made being or sheltering a Catholic priest in England or Wales high treason, punishable by hanging, drawing and quartering.

"Priest hunters" had already been tasked with collecting information and locating any priests, and executions of seminary priests, starting with Cuthbert Mayne in 1577, were becoming routine. Hides had already been built before then: the first reference to one is in 1574 at a search of the Vavasours' house in York, and Edmund Campion was captured in one at Lyford Grange in 1581, but they did not become widespread until well into the 1580s, and there are reports of priests hiding in barns, haystacks and hollow trees. The 1584 Act changed everything, making it too dangerous for a priest to stay in any one place for more than a day or two, as their arrest would make their hosts liable to execution. In response to this, and following a conference and prayer meeting of the Jesuits and other seminaries held at Harleyford in July 1586 (at which the music was directed by William Byrd), a new strategy was adopted under which each priest would be stationed long-term in a single country house and such houses would be systematically equipped with hides. Previously, few, if any, actual hides existed, and the priests had been largely itinerant, but this involved staying at inns, and many were arrested while travelling. Simultaneously, an 'underground railroad' was set up to smuggle priests into the country and move them to holding centres (called 'receptacles') until a long term posting became available.

== Location and use ==
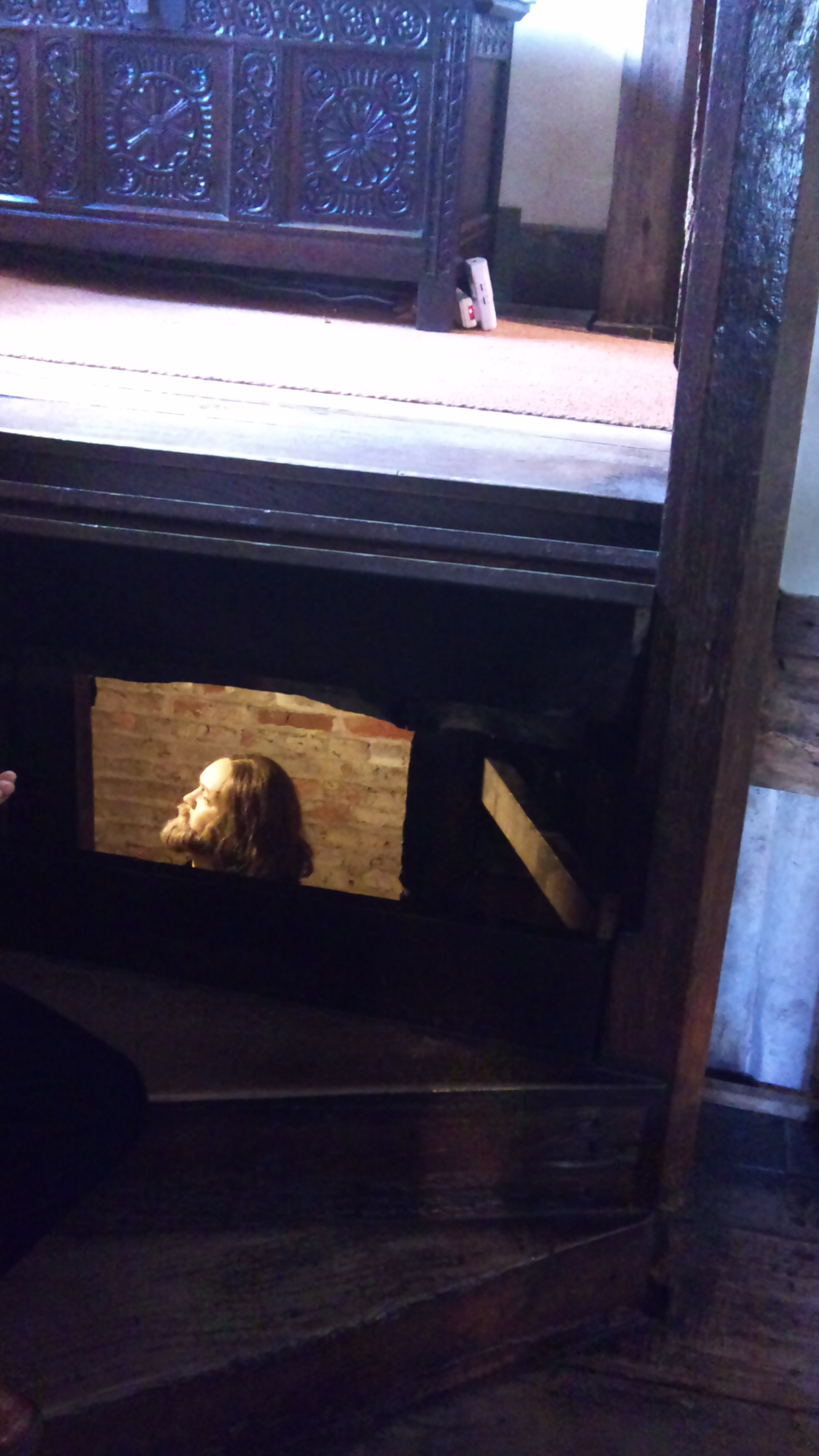
One of the hides at Harvington Hall, accessed by tilting a step on the grand staircase.

An English country house "was more than simply a family home. It combined some of the functions of a museum, a local government office, a farm and a hotel." "If it was a recusant house, it was also a church, a presbytery and something of a thieves' Alsatia." The conflict between the public nature of some of these functions and the need for security, meant that priest holes and recusant chapels are almost always found on the upper floors of houses, well away from the majority of the easily-bribed estate workers and affording an extra few minutes to reach a hide when search parties arrived. Houses with thick stone walls offered many options for excavating hides, but in brick or timber-framed houses, hides are usually located in or around chimneystacks or staircases. Hides large enough to hold a person were known as 'conveyances', but there are also many examples of small hidden spaces to accommodate vestments, sacred vessels, and altar furniture, which were known as 'secret corners'. The need for the hides to be close at hand was dramatically demonstrated on Maundy Thursday (17 April) 1606 when the Lord Mayor of London led a search of John Gerard's house in London. The searchers found the congregation and the smoke of the extinguished candles, but the priest, Thomas Everard made it safely into one of the three hides in the house and was not found.

The novelists' favourite entrance - a secret door in the panelling - is rather rare, but there is one example at Ripley Castle in North Yorkshire. Most were accessed from a trapdoor. A common early pattern of hide is a space under the floor of a garderobe for example at Harvington Hall in Worcestershire, which has seven priest holes throughout the house, including access through the main staircase, panelling, and a false fireplace. Such hides are on the outside walls of buildings and betray themselves as large areas of windowless brickwork, a fact that became known to the searchers. Later and more sophisticated hides tended to be deep within the buildings. Underground hides are extremely rare, although Owen converted a sewer at Baddesley Clinton and there were attested examples at Grosmont Priory and Sledwich.

=== Nicholas Owen ===
Many such hiding places are attributed to a Jesuit lay brother, Nicholas Owen (died 1606), who devoted the greater part of his life to constructing these places to protect the lives of persecuted priests. John Gerard, who knew Owen for almost 20 years and whose life was saved at least three times by Owen's hides, said this about him:

his chief employment was in making of secret places to hide priests and church stuff from the fury of searches. In which kind he was so skilful, both to devise and frame the places in the best manner, and his help therein desired in so many places, that I verily think no man can be said to have done more good of all those that laboured in the English vineyard.

After the Gunpowder Plot, Owen was captured at Hindlip Hall, Worcestershire, taken to the Tower of London and tortured to death on the rack. He was canonised as a martyr by Pope Paul VI in 1970.

== Effectiveness ==
The effectiveness of priest holes was demonstrated by their success in baffling the exhaustive searches of the "pursuivants" (priest-hunters), described in contemporary accounts of the searches. Search-parties would bring with them skilled carpenters and masons and try every possible expedient, from systematic measurements and soundings to the physical tearing down of panelling and pulling up of floors. Another ploy would be for the searchers to pretend to leave and see if the priest would then emerge from hiding. He might be half-starved, cramped, sore with prolonged confinement, and almost afraid to breathe lest the least sound should throw suspicion upon the particular spot where he was concealed.

Searches had mixed success: Edmund Campion was found in a hide during a search in 1581 because the searchers saw light shining through between two planks. Gerard survived a four-day search in 1594 in an identifiable Owen hide (which still exists) and a nine-day search in 1605 at Harrowden (which does not) and a somewhat perfunctory search which was almost certainly at Baddesley Clinton although none of the three eyewitness accounts of the search mention the name of the house. Henry Garnet and Edward Oldcorne were found in an Owen hide at Hindlip Hall on the eighth day of a search following the Gunpowder Plot. Nicholas Owen himself and Ralph Ashley were also arrested during the same search, having been forced by lack of food to attempt to escape from their hide after four days. Edward Oldcorne had previously survived a three-day search at Hindlip in 1598. By and large the hides seem to have done their job: there are very few records of cases of searchers actually finding an occupied hide without help from an informant.

Partly due to the existence of these priest holes, the execution tally fell from 100 during the 1580s to around 60 in the 1590s, 30 in the 1600s, 10 in the 1610s and 3 in the 1620s, whilst the number of priests at work rose from 130 in 1586 to 400 in 1610.

== In popular culture ==
Authors of British mysteries occasionally use priest holes as a device to explain how a character disappears or appears. Examples in TV series include Lovejoy, episode “The Judas Pair” from 1986; Father Brown, episode "The Ghost in the Machine" from 2014; and Timeless, episode "Party at Castle Vallarta” from 2018.

One of Owen's priest holes plays a key role in the Catherine Aird mystery novel A Most Contagious Game (1967). A priest hole attributed to him is also part of Peter Carey's novel Parrot and Olivier in America (2010).

A priest hole was utilized in the James Bond film Skyfall (2012) as a means of escape during the final confrontation of the film.

== Buildings with priest holes ==
- Baddesley Clinton
- Boscobel House
- Bramall Hall
- Carlton Towers
- Coughton Court
- Hailsham
- Harvington Hall
- Moseley Old Hall
- Oxburgh Hall
- Ripley Castle
- Scotney Castle
- Soulton Hall
- Speke Hall
- Towneley Hall
- Tue Brook House
- Ufton Court

== See also ==
- Priest hunter
- Anti-Catholicism in the United Kingdom
- English and Irish Penal Laws
- Come Rack! Come Rope!
