= Thomas Lister (Jesuit) =

English Jesuit writer

Thomas Lister (alias Thomas Butler) (born c.1559, died probably before 1628) was an English Jesuit writer.

== Life ==
Lister was born in Lancashire in northern England, the son of Christopher Lister, of Midhope, Yorkshire. He entered Douai College, in 1576. Having occasion to return to England, he was seized and imprisoned. He, however, obtained his release, and in 1579 was received into the English College, Rome. There, three years later, he joined the Society of Jesus in February, 1582–83.

He graduated in Divinity at Pont-à-Mousson in 1592. In 1596, he went on to the English mission, but was arrested in 1598 and endured a long incarceration.

Lister seems to have resided continuously in England. He is known to have stayed at Hindlip Hall and visited Warblington Castle. His death probably occurred shortly before 1628.

== Works ==
Difficulties had broken out among the English Catholic clergy, the so-called archpriest controversy, amounting to the refusal of certain among them to recognize the authority of the newly appointed archpriest, Dr. George Blackwell. Lister was at this point consulted by one of the priests as to the conduct of those who refused obedience. His reply took the form of a small treatise entitled Adversus factiosos in ecclesia, in which their conduct was vigorously censured. They are declared to have ipso facto have fallen into schism, and to have incurred excommunication and irregularity. It is doubtful whether this tractate was published; but it was widely circulated in manuscript, and proved divisive. To the request of the clergy that he would prohibit it, Blackwell replied curtly (April, 1957):

Your request is that we should call in the treatise against your schism; and this is unreasonable, because the medicine ought not to be removed until the sore be thoroughly cured. If it grieve you, I am not grieved thereat.

His conduct in regard to Lister's tract formed the first of the six grounds on which was based the "Appeal of thirty-three clergymen", against his administration. The appellants obtained a favourable hearing at Rome. Lister's tract was suppressed by a papal Brief (May 1601), and Blackwell rebuked for his unreasonable conduct.

The treatise Adversus factiosos was incorporated into Christopher Bagshaw's Relatio compendium turbarum; a portion of it was reprinted in Thomas Graves Law, Historical Sketch of Conflicts between Jesuits and Seculars in the Reign of Elizabeth (London, 1889), appendix D.
