= William Habington =

English poet

William Habington (4 November 1605 – 30 November 1654) was an English poet.

== Life ==
Habington was born at Hindlip Hall, Worcestershire, and belonged to a well-known Catholic family. His father, Thomas Habington, an antiquary and historical scholar, had been implicated in the plots on behalf of Mary, Queen of Scots; his uncle, Sir Edward Habington, was beheaded in 1586 on the charge of conspiring against Elizabeth I in connection with Sir Anthony Babington; while to his mother, Mary Habington, was attributed the revelation of the Gunpowder Plot.

The poet received his education in Paris and Saint-Omer. The information given by Anthony à Wood in his Athenae that Habington returned to England "to escape the importunity of the Jesuits to join their order" rests only on a vague statement made by the ex-Catholic James Wadsworth in his English Spanish Pilgrim. He married about 1632 Lucy, second daughter of Sir William Herbert, 1st Baron Powis, the dedicatee of his first book of poems.

== Writings ==
His volume of lyrical poems arranged in two parts and entitled Castara was published anonymously in 1634, and celebrated his marriage to Lucy. In 1635 appeared a second edition enlarged by three prose characters, fourteen new lyrics and eight touching elegies on his friend and kinsman, George Talbot, 9th Earl of Shrewsbury. The third edition (1640), issued for the first time in his name, contains a third part consisting of a prose character of A Holy Man and twenty-two devotional poems.

He also wrote a tragi-comedy, The Queen of Arragon (1640), published without his consent by his kinsman, Philip Herbert, Earl of Pembroke, and revived at the Restoration; six essays on events in modern history, Observations upon History (1641); and, along with his father, ‘’The History of Edward IV’’ (1640).

Thoreau in the introspective conclusion to Walden quotes from Habington’s poem ‘To My Honoured Friend, Sir Ed. P. Knight’:

“Direct your eye right inward, and you’ll find

A thousand regions in your mind

Yet undiscovered. Travel them, and be

Expert in home-cosmography”.
