= Ralph Ashley =

English Jesuit lay-brother and martyr

Blessed Ralph Ashley S.J.
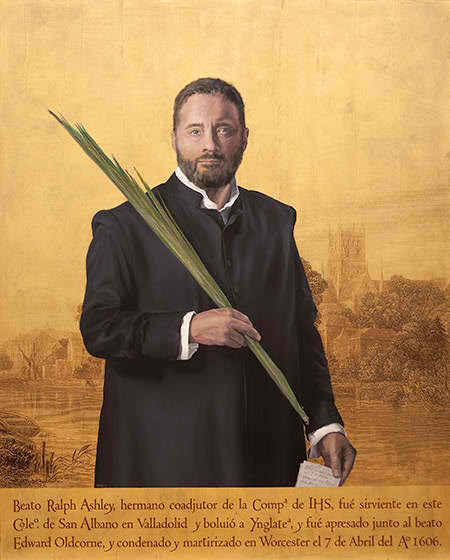

Jesuit Laybrother and Martyr
- Died: 7 April 1606; Red Hill, Worcester
- Honored in: Roman Catholic Church
- Beatified: 15 December 1929 by Pope Pius XI
- Feast: 7 April
- Attributes: Martyr's palm, letter

Ralph Ashley, SJ (died 7 April 1606) was an English Jesuit lay brother who became involved with the aftermath of the Gunpowder Plot. He is a Catholic martyr, beatified in 1929.

== Life ==
Ashley is first heard of as cook at Douay College, which he left on 28 April 1590 for the English College, Valladolid. Here he entered the Society of Jesus, but after a time returned to England because of ill-health.

He fell in with Father Tesimond (Greenway), who eulogizes the courage he had displayed among the Dutch, by whom he had been captured during his journey. He landed in England on 9 March 1598 and was sent to serve Edward Oldcorne.

Eight years later, he and Oldcorne were arrested at Hindlip Hall, near Worcester, and were committed to the Tower of London, together with Henry Garnet, and Nicholas Owen, another lay-brother, servant to Garnet. The two servants were tortured, Owen dying.

Ashley sometimes used an alias, George Chambers. His confessions or examinations mention that he came to Hindlip in November 1605 for two days. In afternoon before the search at Hindlip on 20 January 1606, he saw Garnet and Oldcorne alias Hall in the gallery.

He was ultimately remanded with Oldcorne to Worcester, where they were tried, condemned and executed together at Red Hill. He accompanied his master to their execution. It is said that as Oldcorne waited on the ladder to die, Ashley kissed his feet and said, "“What a happy man am I to follow the steps of my Father unto death." Oldcorne died with the name of St Winifred on his lips.

When Ashley came to die he prayed and asked for forgiveness and said that like Oldcorne he was dying for his religion and not for being a traitor. Ashley threw his garters to a Catholic woman in the crowd.

Edward Oldcorne and Ashley were beatified in 1929.
