= Edward Habington =

Edward Habington, Abington, or Abingdon (1553?–1586), was one of the conspirators in the Babington Plot.

Habington, born about 1553, was the eldest son of John Habington of Hindlip, Worcestershire, by his wife Catherine, daughter of John Wykes. Thomas Habington was a younger brother. His father held the office of under-treasurer or 'cofferer' to Queen Elizabeth.

Edward Habington was educated at Exeter College, Oxford, where he took his bachelor's degree in 1574. On leaving the university he spent much time at court. He there made the acquaintance of Anthony Babington, a Catholic courtier, who early in 1586 was maturing, at the instigation of a Jesuit, a plan for a general rising of the Catholics which should accomplish the murder of the queen and the liberation of Mary, Queen of Scots, at that time imprisoned at Chartley.

Thomas Morgan sent Habington an "alphabet" or cipher key to write to Mary Stuart. Habington not only joined Babington's conspiracy with other young frequenters of the court, but was named one of the six conspirators charged with the contemplated murder of Elizabeth.

In July 1586 the plot was discovered by Francis Walsingham's spies. Habington, found at the end of August in hiding near the residence of his family in Worcestershire, was taken to the Tower of London. Brought with six others to trial on 15 September, he resolutely denied his guilt, and claimed to be confronted with two witnesses to his complicity, according to Edward VI's statute regulating trials for treason. But on the confession of other prisoners, and on the fragments of a confession written and subsequently torn up by himself while in prison, he was found guilty and condemned to death. On 20 September 1586 he was hanged and quartered in St. Giles's Fields. In a speech from the scaffold he vehemently maintained his innocence.

According to Raphael Holinshed, Edward Habington was the last of the first group of seven convicted conspirators to be executed. He made a defiant speech declaring a forthcoming "effusion of blood in England".
