= Hindlip Hall =

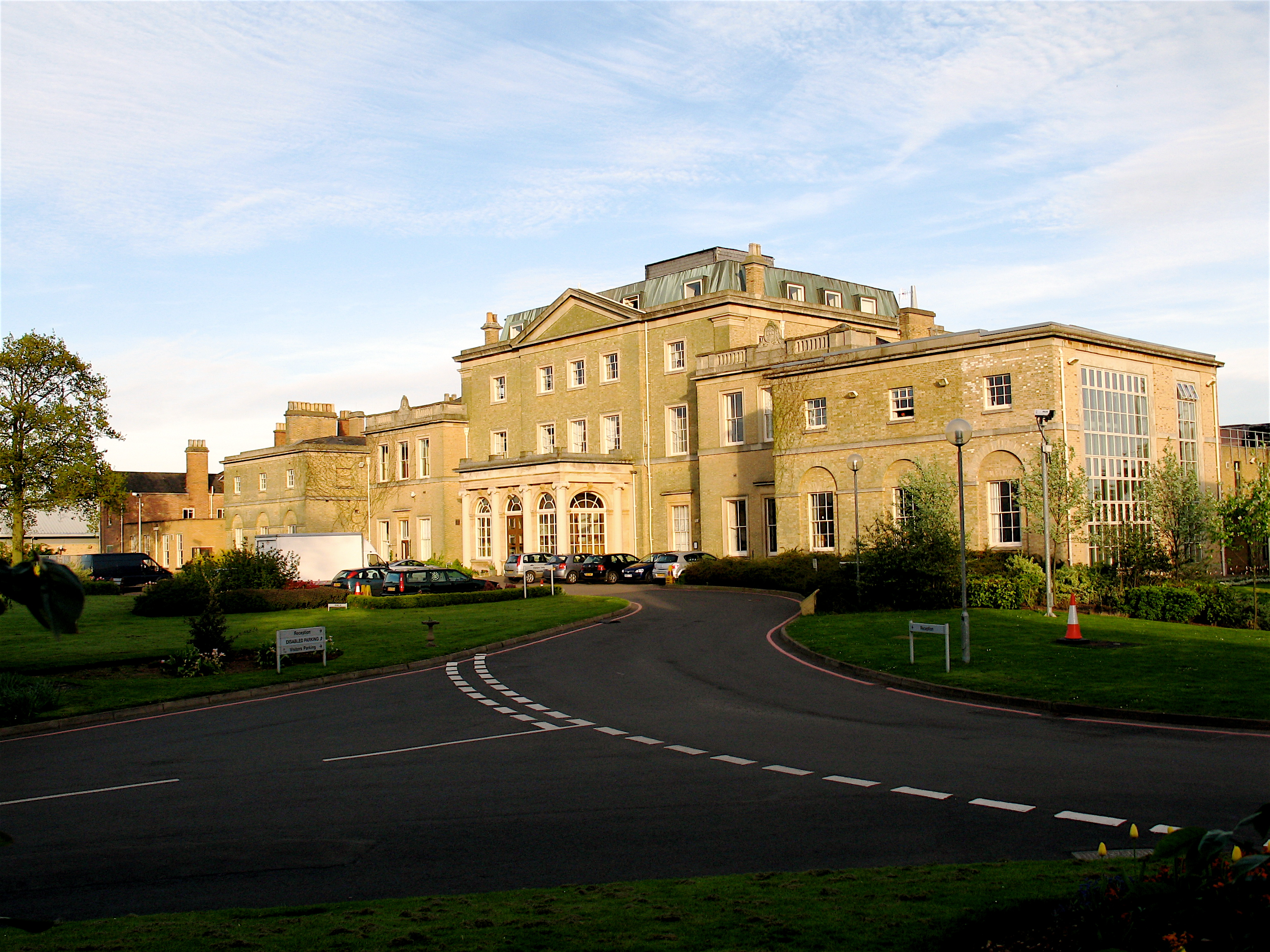
- The hall in 2005

- Location within Worcestershire

General information
- Type: Stately home
- Location: Hindlip
- Coordinates: 52°13′30″N 2°10′32″W
- Completed: 1575 (rebuilt c. 1820)
- Owner: In the care of the West Mercia Police

Website
- https://www.westmercia.police.uk/article/4406/Hindlip-Hall-Police-Headquarters

Hindlip Hall is a stately home in Hindlip, Worcestershire, England. The first major hall was built before 1575, and it played a significant role in both the Babington Plot and the Gunpowder Plot, where it hid four people in priest holes. It was Humphrey Littleton who told the authorities that Edward Oldcorne was hiding here after he had been heard saying Mass at Hindlip Hall. Four people were executed and the owner at that time barely escaped execution himself due to the intercession of Lord Monteagle.

It was later owned by a poet and was for a while a girls' school before being rebuilt by Lord Southwell in 1820. The Hall was designated as a potential home for the war cabinet in 1940. It is now home to the West Mercia Police and Hereford and Worcester Fire and Rescue Service headquarters.

== Early history ==
The house was originally built before 1575 to replace an earlier timber framed manor house in a brick construction with towers and large windows, by John Habington, an official in the court of Elizabeth I and his second wife Dorothy Bradbelt. During her visit to Worcester, Queen Elizabeth dined at Hindlip Hall on 16 August 1575. John Habington's three children Edward, Thomas and Dorothy were all Catholic Recusants. After their father's death in 1582, Sir Edward and Sir Thomas were involved in the Babington Plot which hoped to put a Catholic queen on the throne. Edward was beheaded but Thomas was shown mercy due to being godson to Queen Elizabeth I.

=== Priest holes ===
After imprisonment, Thomas Habington and his wife, Mary, retired to Hindlip Hall, which they had adapted as a refuge with priest holes constructed for Catholic priests including some built by Nicholas Owen. Mary was the sister of Lord Monteagle. In 1598, the house was searched by men looking for Edward Oldcorne. They found a point used to fasten his hose, which was unlike any of Thomas Habington's, but could not discover his hiding place in the gallery.

When the Gunpowder plot was discovered, as a result of Lord Monteagle's letter, the Jesuit priest Edward Oldcorne was at Hindlip. Oldcorne recounted, under interrogation, that on the 8 November 1605 there arrived Oswald Tesimond from Robert Wintour's who told Mr (H)Abington and himself that "he brought them the worst news that they had ever heard, and they were all undone." Tesimond said that certain people had intended to blow up the parliament house but they had been discovered a few days before.

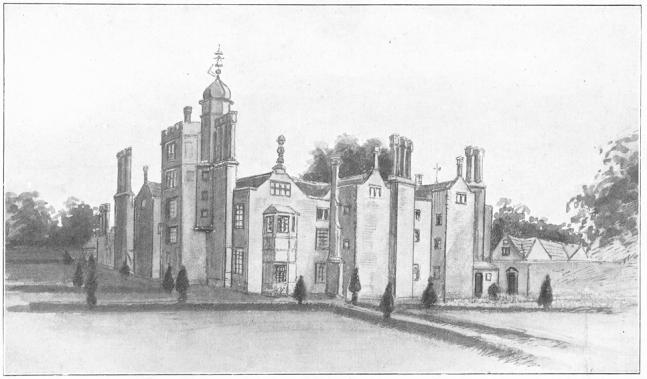
The first hall.

In December, Oldcorne was joined by Nicholas Owen, Henry Garnet and Ralph Ashley who were hiding because they were also under suspicion of involvement. The hall was searched on 20 January 1606 but no one was discovered and Abington denied that there was anyone hiding. The four were not discovered even though Garnet and Oldcorne were in one hiding place whilst the two lay brothers were in another. However the house continued to be searched for the next twelve days. A document written at the time records they "found two cunning and very artificial conveyances in the main brick-wall, so ingeniously framed, and with such art, as it cost much labour ere they could be found. Three other secret places, contrived with no less skill and industry, were found in and about the chimneys, in one whereof two of the traitors were close concealed. These chimney-conveyances being so strangely formed, having the entrances into them so curiously covered over with brick, mortared and made fast to planks of wood, and coloured black, like the other parts of the chimney, that very diligent inquisition might well have passed by, without throwing the least suspicion upon such unsuspicious places."

There were in fact eleven hiding places discovered. Two of the Jesuits came out after a few days but Oldcorne and Garnet survived for eight days before they surrendered.

Oldcorne and Garnet were arrested by Sir Henry Bromley and held briefly at the castle at Holt before being taken to the Tower of London en route to execution in Worcester.

Thomas Habington was again arrested, and sentenced, but spared. He spent the rest of his life writing. It is said in several sources that he was not allowed outside the county, but there is evidence that this is unlikely. Hindlip Hall came to be celebrated, as it was believed that Mary Habington had written the letter revealing the Gunpowder Plot, and "as much of the plot was there hatch'd, so it was from thence that it came to be prevented".

=== After the plot ===
Thomas's son, William Habington, was a minor poet and his son, Thomas, died without a natural heir and left the hall to Sir William Compton.

== Later history ==
The old hall was destroyed by fire and was demolished in 1820.

The new hall was built by Lord Southwell in a Greek Revival style. After his death in 1860 the hall was bought by the Burton-on-Trent brewer Henry Allsopp, who became the first Baron Hindlip in 1886. The house and gardens continued to be improved. In 1887 Lord Hindlip had a new 6-acre (24,000 m^{2}) lake created and the old one was filled in and 4,000 fish were taken out. The Allsopp family moved to Wiltshire early in the 20th century. The Hall went through a number of uses including about twenty five years as a girls' school.

=== 1940 ===
During the Second World War it was taken over by the Ministry of Works. There were emergency plans drawn up to move Cabinet-level Ministers of the Crown to Hindlip Hall if required, with the Prime Minister's office also based nearby at Spetchley Court. In 1947 after the war it came into the ownership of Worcestershire County Council and the land was set aside for future use as a college, with the main house turned into the headquarters of the County Police.

=== Today ===
Since 1967 the Hall has been the West Mercia Police police headquarters. It is close to junction six of the M5 motorway. The church of St. James is no longer supported by the Church of England (since 1997), but is now the church for the constabulary. In 2018, Hereford and Worcester Fire and Rescue Service relocated its headquarters to Hindlip Park, co-locating with West Mercia Police.

In 1985 the Hall was designated a Grade II* listed building. Whilst the building is not open to the general public and surveillance is heavily monitored, access to the grounds can be gained via public footpaths from Hindlip Lane to the south and Pershore Lane to the northeast.
