= Treadway Russell Nash =

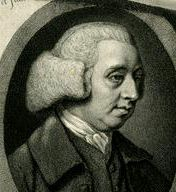
- Born: 24 June 1724; Clerkenleap, Kempsey, Worcestershire
- Died: 26 January 1811 (aged 86); Beveré, Worcestershire
- Occupation(s): Clergyman, Worcestershire antiquarian
- Relatives: Rowland Berkeley (great-grandfather)

Treadway Russell Nash (24 June 1724 – 26 January 1811) was an English clergyman, now known as an early historian of Worcestershire and the author of Collections for the History of Worcestershire, an important source document for Worcestershire county histories. He was a fellow of the Society of Antiquaries of London.

== Early life ==
Treadway Russell Nash was born on 24 June 1724 born at Clerkenleap, in Kempsey, Worcestershire. His family were from Ombersley. They had lands there and at Claines, and had later bought lands in the Reformation around St Peter's, Droitwich. He was related to Thomas Nash, husband of Elizabeth Barnard, as well as James Nash and John Nash, both MPs for Worcester. He was an uncle of architect John Nash and a cousin of Abner Nash, the 2nd Governor of North Carolina. His father Richard, a grandson of Sir Rowland Berkeley, died in 1740, and Richard's eldest son in 1757. As a result, Treadway Russell Nash inherited the Russells' Strensham estates from his brother, as well as the Nash estates, and took both names.

He was educated from the age of twelve at King's School, Worcester, and became a scholar at Worcester College, Oxford aged fifteen. In March 1749, he accompanied his brother on a trip to the continent, to aid Richard's health. They visited Paris for about six weeks, before spending the summer "on the banks of the Loire". They then visited "Bourdeaux, Thoulouse, Montpelier, Marseilles, Leghorn, Florence, Rome, Naples, Bologna, Venice, Padua, Verona, Milan, Lyons, and again Paris"; such expeditions are often known as the Grand Tour.

On his return in late summer 1751, Nash took up a post as Vicar of Eynsham through his friend and future brother-in-law, John Martin. He also had an income as a tutor at Oxford. He took his Doctor of Divinity degree and left Oxford, having "gone out grand compounder", following the death of his brother. He also left his benefice at Eynsham in 1757. While at Oxford he had proposed a road from there to Witney (now the A40 and B4022), and also stood for Parliament.

Nash married Margaret Martin in 1758, the daughter of John Martin of Overbury. Nash and his wife moved to Claines, Worcestershire, where Nash leased Bevere Manor and later built Bevere House. Then:

In the year 1759, as the furniture, &c. of Dr. Nash were being conveyed from London, an accident, as extraordinary as it was unfortunate, occurred. A bottle of aqua-fortis, which was in the waggon, being ill corked, opened, and the spirit running over some deal boxes which took fire and set the whole in a flame, property to the amount of 2000 l.[pounds] belonging to Dr. Nash, was unfortunately burnt, besides a good collection of books, and a very curious and valuable selection of drawings and prints, which he and his brother had purchased in France and Italy.

== Work as an antiquary ==
In 1773, Nash determined that someone should collect together papers and records relating to Worcestershire. He later related that:

Above twenty years ago, coming into possession of a considerable real estate in this my native county, I determined, as far as was consistent with a proper attention to my own affairs, to serve my countrymen and neighbours by every means in my power. Thus, I became a mere provincial man, confining my ambition within the ancient province of Wiccia, now commonly known by the name of Worcestershire. I had oftentimes wished that someone would write the history and antiquities of the county. I proposed the undertaking to several persons, offering them all the assistance in my power. I invited the Society of Antiquaries to choose a proper person, promising to open a subscription with three or four hundred pounds. Failing in success in all my applications, I offered my own shoulders, however unequal to the burthen, reflecting that though very little had been published, yet this work was in some degree made easy, because materials had been collecting for near 200 years.

The reception to his work can be seen to be generally very positive. However, they were primarily source material, rather than a true history:

Dr Nash's volumes are indeed worthy of high praise, and contain materials for a valuable history, —they preserve and render accessible many important documents, but can be considered only as a work of reference. Like a sinuous but unnavigable river wandering through a great extent of country, that would form an excellent reservoir to a canal, so the Doctor's work, though itself unreadable, might be made the source of a very interesting volume.

== Republishing Samuel Butler ==
Nash produced a volume with a "literary memoir" of Samuel Butler's Hudibras, a satirical poem about Cromwell's Protectorate written after the Restoration. In 1797, Nash became Rector of Strensham, where Butler had grown up. It was reprinted extensively into the nineteenth century. The edition includes illustrations after William Hogarth.

== Death and legacy ==
Nash died in 1811, at his house in Beveré. He was buried in the family vault at St Peter's Church, Droitwich. His wife, Margaret, died a few months later, aged 78 on 21 May 1811. They were survived by their daughter Margaret, who had married John Somers in 1785.

At his death, he left around £60,000, excluding his estate. He left his artistic collection from his travels in Italy and France to Worcester College, where it remains. His personal papers are at Eastnor Castle, except for his personalised volumes of the Collections, which had been sold and subsequently lost in a fire.

== Works ==
- Nash, Treadway (1781), Collections for the History of Worcestershire, London: John Nichols, OL 13812281M
- Butler, Samuel (1869), Hudibras, New York: D. Appleton, OL 13522519M with notes and a literary memoir by the Rev. Treadway Russel [sic] Nash
