= Hindlip =

Village in Worcestershire, England

Coordinates: 52.225468°N 2.17856°W

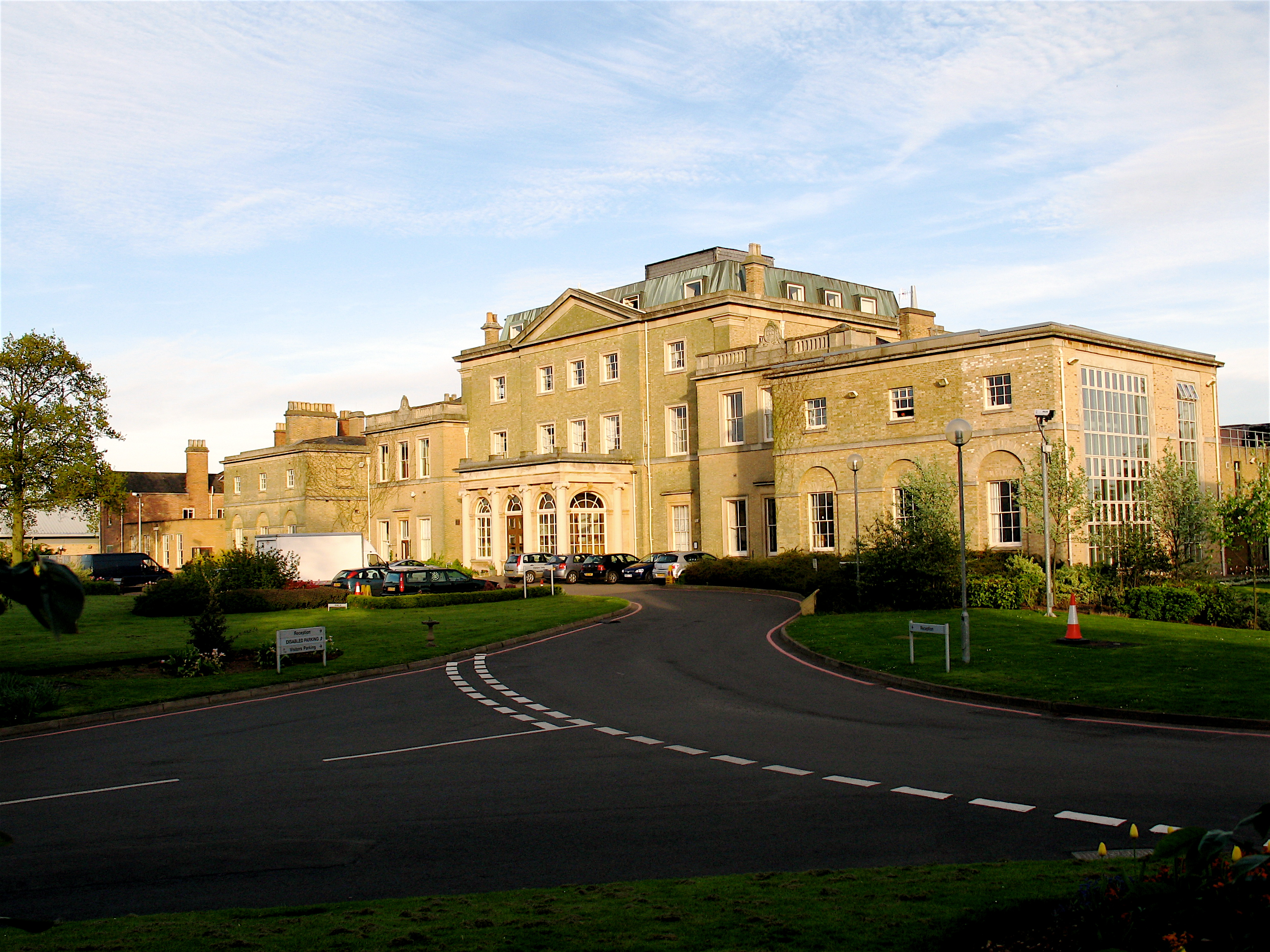
- Hindlip Hall

- Location within Worcestershire
- Area: 4.4011 km^{2} (1.6993 sq mi)
- Population: 190 (2021 census)
  - Density: 43/km^{2} (110/sq mi)
- OS grid reference: SO879586
- Civil parish: Hindlip
- District: Wychavon
- Shire county: Worcestershire
- Region: West Midlands
- Country: England
- Sovereign state: United Kingdom
- Post town: Worcester
- Postcode district: WR3
- Police: West Mercia
- Fire: Hereford and Worcester
- Ambulance: West Midlands
- UK Parliament: Droitwich and Evesham

Hindlip or Hinlip is a village and civil parish 3 miles (4.8 km) north east of Worcester, in the Wychavon district, in the county of Worcestershire, England. In 2021 the parish had a population of 190. The parish touches Tibberton, Martin Hussingtree, Salwarpe, Oddingley, Warndon and North Claines.

== Features ==
There are 15 listed buildings in Hindlip. Hindlip Hall, a stately home originally built in 1563, rebuilt in 1820 following its destruction by fire is the headquarters of the West Mercia Police. St James's Church is a 15th-century parish church which is no longer supported by the Church of England (since 1997), but is now the church for the constabulary.

== History ==
The name "Hindlip" means 'Hind leap'. Hindlip was recorded in the Domesday Book as Hindelep. Hindlip was "Hindehlep" in the 10th century, "Hundeslep" in the 12th century, "Hindelupe" in the 13h century and Henlipp in the 16th century. On the 22nd of December 1886 Upper and Lower Smite Houses, a part of Warndon parish was transferred to the parish. The transferred area contained 5 houses in 1891. On the 1st of April 1952 18 acres were transferred to the parish from North Claines and 5 acres were transferred to Warndon. The parish was historically in the Oswaldslow hundred. Hindlip was possibly a deserted medieval village.
