= Edward Oldcorne =

English Jesuit priest

Blessed Edward Oldcorne SJ
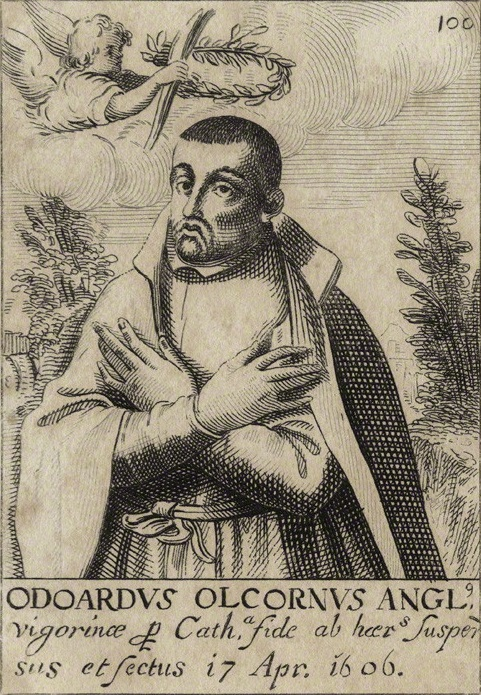
- Flemish engraving of Edward Oldcorne (1561–1606), English Jesuit priest.

Martyr
- Born: c. 1561; York, North Yorkshire, England
- Died: 7 April 1606 (aged 44 - 45); Red Hill, Worcester, Worcestershire, England
- Honored in: Roman Catholic Church
- Beatified: 15 December 1929 by Pope Pius XI
- Feast: 7 April

Edward Oldcorne alias Hall (1561 – 7 April 1606) was an English Jesuit priest. He was known to people who knew of the Gunpowder Plot to destroy the Parliament of England and kill King James I; and although his involvement is unclear, he was caught up in the subsequent investigation. He is a Roman Catholic martyr and was beatified in 1929.

== Early life ==
Oldcorne was born in York in 1561, the son of John Oldcorne, a bricklayer, and his wife Mary. His father was a Protestant, and his mother a Catholic who had spent some time in prison due to her faith. He was educated at St Peter's School in York; school friends were John and Christopher Wright and Guy Fawkes.

Oldcorne was educated as a doctor, but later decided to enter the priesthood. He went to the English College at Reims, then to Rome where after ordination in 1587, he became a Jesuit in 1588.

== On the English mission ==
In late 1588 Oldcorne returned to England, in the company of Father John Gerard. In early 1589 he went with Father Henry Garnet to the West Midlands, visiting Coughton, Warwickshire and settling at Baddesley Clinton. He then worked chiefly in Worcestershire for 17 years. Oswald Tesimond assisted him after 1596; Father Thomas Lister, another Jesuit, also supported Oldcorne's mission but found the requirements of the covert life difficult.

Oldcorne sometimes stayed with Thomas Abington, whose house at Hindlip Hall was near Worcester. There he converted Thomas's sister Dorothy. The house was then adapted by Nicholas Owen to help conceal Catholic priests.

== From 1601 to 1605 ==
On 3 November 1601, Oldcorne went on a pilgrimage to St Winefride's Well at Holywell in north Wales to obtain a cure for a cancer of the throat. The cancer cleared up and in 1605 about thirty people returned with him to give thanks for his recovery. Amongst this group were the priests Oswald Tesimond, Henry Garnet and John Gerard, as well as Jesuit brothers Nicholas Owen and Ralph Ashley.

Also in the group was plotter Everard Digby and his wife, whose priest was Oldcorne. The timing of this second pilgrimage and the people involved later aroused suspicion. The government investigation used this gathering as circumstantial evidence to implicate some of those there in the plot.

== Aftermath of the Plot ==
When the Gunpowder Plot was discovered, Oldcorne was at Hindlip Hall, his base for fourteen years. In December, he was joined there by Nicholas Owen, Henry Garnet and Ralph Ashley who were hiding because they were under suspicion of involvement. Hindlip was searched in January 1606. Garnet and Oldcorne were in one hiding place while the two lay brothers, Owen and Ashley, were in another. Their conditions were poor, and after eight days they were captured. Oldcorne and Garnet were arrested by Sir Henry Bromley and held briefly at the castle at Holt in Worcestershire before being taken to the Tower of London. It has been said that Bromley would have abandoned his search much earlier but he had information from Humphrey Littleton that Oldcorne and possibly Garnet were hiding there.

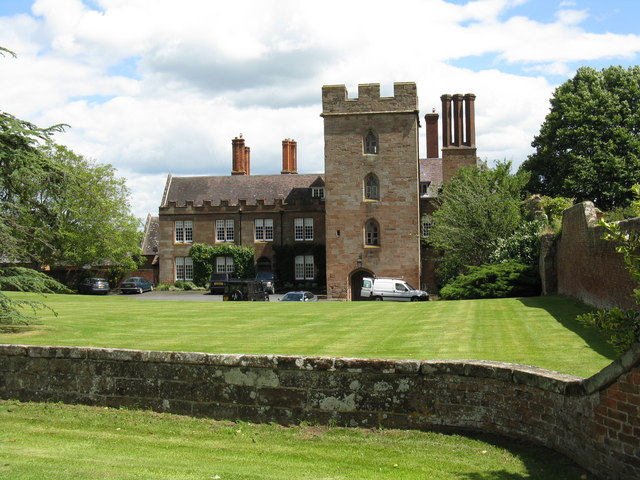
Holt Castle (in 2008), where Oldcorne was briefly held

== Trial and execution ==
Oldcorne was tortured, but no evidence was found to connect him to the Gunpowder Plot. He recounted under interrogation that on 8 November 1605 there arrived Tesimond from Robert Wintour's who told Mr (H)Abington and himself that "he brought them the worst news that they had ever heard, and they were all undone". Tesimond said that certain people had intended to blow up the parliament house but they had been discovered a few days before it was meant to happen.

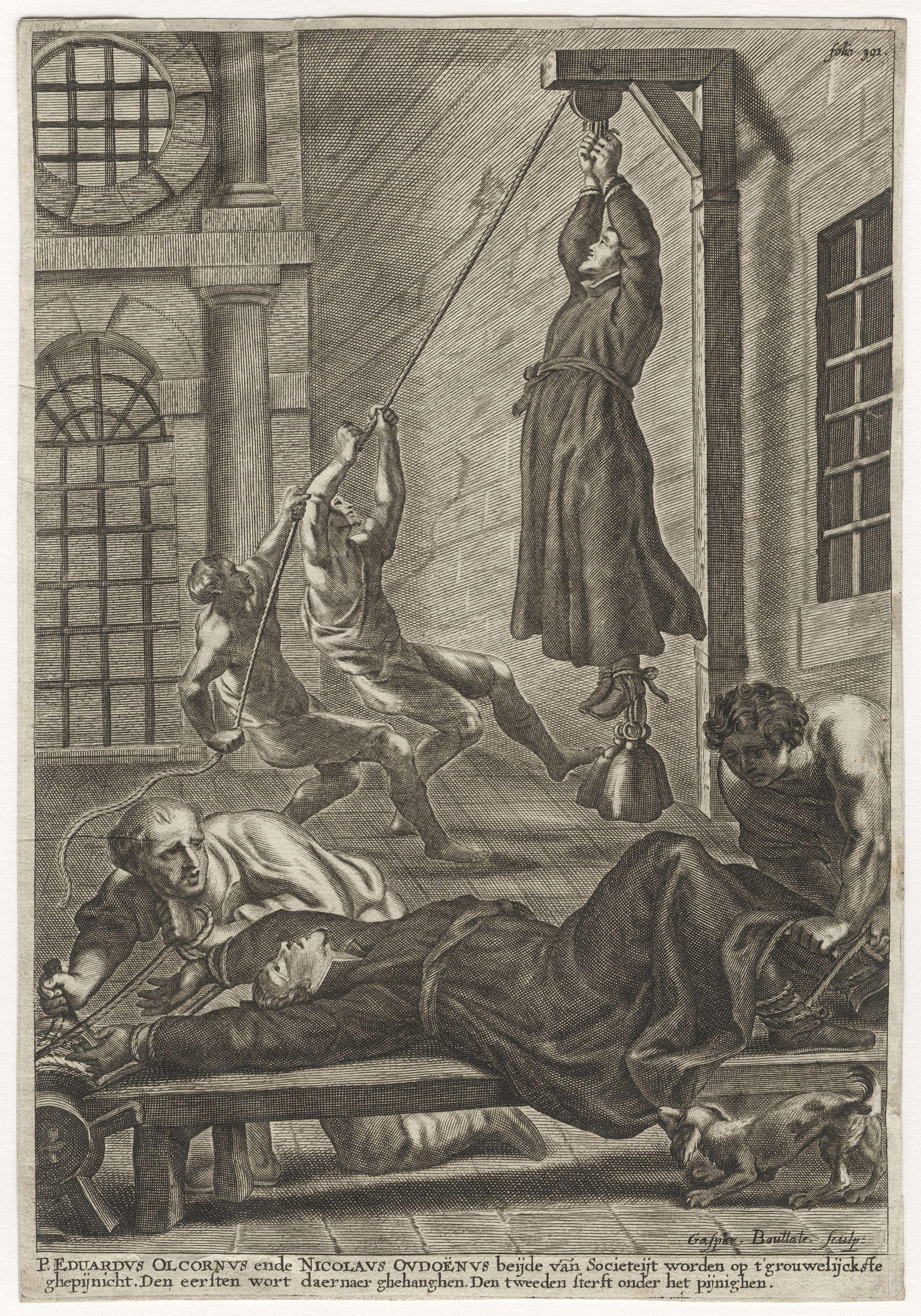
Edward Oldcorne and Nicholas Owen, engraving by Gaspar Bouttats

Some allege that Oldcorne was executed just for his priesthood. Others suppose that it may have been because he was notorious or because he had provided safe refuge through Father Jones for the plotters, Robert Wintour and Stephen Littleton (Stephen Lyttelton); or for providing a hiding place for his superior Henry Garnet at Hindlip. At his trial, Humphrey Littleton asked for his forgiveness and it was said that he believed he deserved to die for revealing his friend's whereabouts. Two letters of his are at Stonyhurst, the second written from prison. On the day before his execution John Floyd, a fellow Jesuit, was arrested for trying to visit him.

Oldcorne was executed at Red Hill, Worcester on 7 April 1606, together with John Wintour, Humphrey Littleton and Ralph Ashley, his Jesuit brother colleague. He was hanged, drawn, and quartered; it is said that, as Oldcorne waited on the ladder to die, Ashley kissed his feet and said, "What a happy man am I to follow in the steps of my sweet father". Oldcorne died with the name of St Winifred on his lips. When Ashley came to die he prayed and asked for forgiveness and noted that like Oldcorne he was dying for his religion and not as a traitor.

== Legacy ==
Oldcorne's portrait was painted after his death for the Church of the Gesù. A number of his relics survived including one of his eyes which he lost when the executioner decapitated him: it is said that the force of the blow was so great that his eye flew out of its socket. A secondary school, Blessed Edward Oldcorne Catholic College, named in his honour, is in Worcester. His right eye is preserved at Stonyhurst College. They believe that the eye was taken by a Catholic sympathiser while his body was being parboiled after he was quartered.

Abington's wife Mary was the sister of William Parker, 4th Baron Monteagle; Lord Monteagle was later to become a pivotal figure in the capture of the gunpowder plotters. The authorship of Monteagle's letter has been a significant problem for historians. One of the candidates put forward is Oldcorne.
