= John Grant (Gunpowder Plot) =

Member of the failed Gunpowder Plot

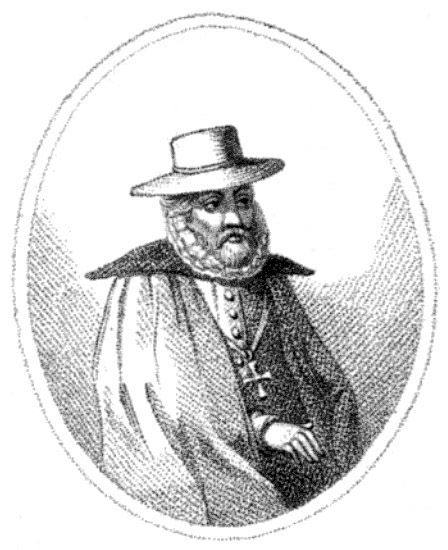
- 19th-century portrait of Grant
- Born: c. 1570
- Died: 30 January 1606 (aged 35–36); London, England
- Spouse: Dorothy Wintour
- Children: Wintour Grant
- Motive: Gunpowder Plot, a conspiracy to assassinate King James VI & I and members of the Houses of Parliament
- Conviction: High treason
- Penalty: Hanged, drawn and quartered

Details
- Role: Uprising
- Enlisted: Early 1605
- Date apprehended: 8 November 1605

John Grant (c. 1570 – 30 January 1606) was a member of the failed Gunpowder Plot, a conspiracy to replace the Protestant King James I of England with a Catholic monarch. Grant was born around 1570, and lived at Norbrook in Warwickshire. He married the sister of another plotter, Thomas Wintour. Grant was enlisted by Robert Catesby, a religious zealot who had grown so impatient with James's lack of toleration for Catholics that he planned to kill him, by blowing up the House of Lords with gunpowder. Grant's role in the conspiracy was to provide supplies for a planned Midlands uprising, during which James's daughter, Princess Elizabeth, would be captured. However, on the eve of the planned explosion, Guy Fawkes was discovered guarding the explosives the plotters had positioned in the undercroft beneath the House of Lords, and arrested.

As the government searched for Fawkes's accomplices, Grant and the others engaged in a futile mission for support for the uprising. They stole horses from Warwick Castle, and further supplies from Hewell Grange, before stopping at Holbeche House. The plotters laid in front of the fire some of the gunpowder they had collected, to dry out, but a stray spark ignited the powder, and in the resultant conflagration Grant was blinded. Government forces besieged the house, and he was captured and taken to London.

At his arraignment in January 1606 Grant pleaded not guilty to high treason, but he was nevertheless sentenced to be hanged, drawn and quartered, and was executed three days later, on 30 January.

== Background ==
Born some time around 1570, John Grant lived at Norbrook, near Snitterfield in Warwickshire. He was married to Thomas Wintour's sister, Dorothy, with a son, Wintour Grant. He is described by author Antonia Fraser as a melancholy individual, but also an intellectual who studied Latin and other languages. He was a resolute character, as the poursuivants who searched his home for Catholic priests were no doubt aware; he was so unwelcoming to them that they eventually shied away from Norbrook. Grant was also involved in the Essex Rebellion against Elizabeth I, as were several of the men with whom he became better acquainted through what became known as the Gunpowder Plot.

== Plot ==
English Catholics hoped that the years of persecution they had suffered during Elizabeth's reign would end when James I came to the throne, as his attitude appeared moderate, even tolerant towards Catholics. In Robert Catesby's view however, James had reneged on his promises, and he quickly lost patience with the new dynasty. He therefore planned to kill James by blowing up the House of Lords with gunpowder, and inciting a popular revolt during which a Catholic monarch would be restored to the throne.

Catesby enlisted the help of six fellow Catholics, (Note: Thomas Percy, Thomas Wintour, Guy Fawkes, John Wright, Robert Keyes, and Thomas Bates.) and by 25 March 1605 he had recruited three others: Robert Wintour, Christopher Wright, and Grant. (Note: 1 January was first used to mark the English new year in 1752. This article uses the modern calendar to avoid confusion.) Grant had received a letter from Catesby inviting him to a meeting that took place in Oxford at the Catherine Wheel inn, where he and Robert Wintour swore an oath after which they were told of the plan. Grant's role in the uprising centred on his house at Norbrook, ideally located in the English Midlands close to Warwick and Stratford, and to Catesby's childhood home at Lapworth (then owned by John Wright). In summer 1605 Grant likely stored weapons and ammunition at Norbrook, but he was also to take charge of the provision of rare war horses from the nearby Warwick Castle.

Concern over the plague had delayed Parliament's opening from February, to October 1605, and the government later claimed that by December 1604 the plotters were busily digging a tunnel beneath Parliament. No evidence exists to substantiate this claim, and no trace of a tunnel was ever found, but perhaps because of the change of dates Grant seems not to have been involved in the endeavour, which was stopped when the tenancy to the undercroft beneath the House of Lords became available. By 20 July the explosives were in position, but the opening of Parliament was again prorogued, this time until 5 November 1605. As Catesby added three more to the conspiracy, the last few details were worked out; Fawkes was to light the fuse that would set off the explosion, and then escape to the continent, while the others would incite the Midlands uprising, and capture James's daughter, Princess Elizabeth. Thus, as the plot moved closer to fruition, on Monday 4 November Grant and a friend were to be found in Dunchurch at the Red Lion inn, with the newly recruited Everard Digby and his "hunting party". (Note: In reality Digby's hunting party was a group of armed men on horseback. By all accounts they were unaware of Digby's true intentions until after Fawkes was discovered.) The group attended a Mass the next morning, before moving on.

== Failure ==
Tipped off by an anonymous letter to William Parker, 4th Baron Monteagle, late on Monday night the authorities had made a search of Parliament. There they had discovered Fawkes guarding the gunpowder the plotters had placed in the undercroft beneath the House of Lords. Catesby and the others, en route to the Midlands, had been alerted to his arrest by those conspirators who had since fled London, and together had ridden to Dunchurch to meet Digby and his party.

By Wednesday 6 November the government was busy searching for Fawkes' accomplices, and towards the end of the day Grant's name appeared on the list of suspects drawn up by the Lord Chief Justice. However, confirmation of his status as a fugitive would not arrive until the next day, when provoked by their raid for supplies on Warwick Castle, the government issued a public proclamation naming Percy, Catesby, Rookwood, Thomas Wintour and both Wright brothers as wanted men. On the same proclamation Grant was misidentified as Edward Grant, and Catesby's servant, Thomas Bates, was probably also misnamed as Robert Ashfield. From Warwick they rode to Grant's home at Norbrook, collecting muskets, calivers and ammunition that he had stored there. Then they continued west through Snitterfield toward Alcester, before stopping at Huddington at about 2:00 pm that afternoon. Early the next morning they attended a Mass conducted by Father Nicholas Hart, who also heard their confessions—a sign that in Fraser's opinion demonstrates that none of them thought they had long to live.

Riding through pouring rain, the fugitives helped themselves to arms, ammunition and money from the vacant home of Lord Windsor at Hewell Grange. Any hopes they harboured of a larger uprising were dashed by the locals, who on hearing that the party stood for "God and Country", replied that they were for "King James as well as God and Country". The group finally reached Holbeche House, on the border of Staffordshire, at about 10:00 pm. Tired and desperate they spread in front of the fire some of the now-soaked gunpowder taken from Hewell Grange, to dry out. An ember from the fire landed on the powder, and the resultant flames engulfed Catesby, Rookwood, Grant and another man.

Grant was blinded by the conflagration, his eyes "burnt out". Some of the plotters disappeared into the night, but Grant stayed with Catesby, Thomas Wintour, Rookwood, the Wright brothers and Percy. With the arrival of the Sheriff of Worcester and his company early on 8 November, the house was besieged. Catesby and Percy were killed, as were both Wright brothers. Wintour and Rookwood were each wounded and were easily captured, as was Grant.

== Trial and execution ==
Grant and the survivors were taken first to Worcester in the custody of the Sheriff, and then to the Tower of London. At their arraignment on 27 January 1606 all except Digby pleaded "Not Guilty", but the outcome was never in doubt; they were all found guilty of high treason, and sentenced to be hanged, drawn and quartered.

The first executions were scheduled for Thursday 30 January 1606. Along with Digby and Robert Wintour (Bates was brought separately, from the Gatehouse Prison), Grant was strapped to a wattled hurdle and dragged through the streets of London to St Paul's churchyard, by St.Paul's Cathedral. Digby was the first to ascend the scaffold, and before he was executed gave a short speech. Wintour followed, saying little. Grant was next. At his trial, when asked why a death sentence should not be pronounced against him, he had replied that he was "guilty of a conspiracy intended, but never effected." Similarly, when faced with the executioner's halter he refused to confess—the only one of the condemned to do so. He was led quietly up the ladder and crossed himself, before being hanged and then subjected to the latter part of his sentence. The other four plotters were executed the following day, in Old Palace Yard.
