= Stephen Lyttelton =

Stephen Littleton
- Born: 1575; Frankley
- Died: 1606 (30-31 years); Stafford, Staffordshire, England
- Cause of death: Executed (hanged, drawn and quartered)
- Criminal charge: Treason
- Criminal penalty: Execution
- Parent(s): George Littleton, Margaret Smith

Stephen Littleton (or Lyttelton) (c. 1575 – 1606), was an Englishman executed for his involvement in the Gunpowder Plot.

He was born as the eldest son of George Littleton and Margaret Smith, daughter and heir to Richard Smith of Shirford, Warwickshire. Stephen was cousin to Humphrey Littleton they were first cousins, which is correctly mentioned in other sources. Stephen Littleton was also cousin to Humphrey's brother John Littleton, who was in 1601 with the Earl of Essex's Uprising against Queen Elizabeth I. Littleton lived mainly in the Holbeche House, the house the conspirators took after the gunfire had failed, and he was considered to have a prominent role in the Catholic community in the Midlands. Littleton has been described as very tall, with brown hair and with no or very little beard growth.

Littleton did not know much about the Gunpowder Plot in advance, but instead he believed that Robert Catesby (the leader of the conspiracy) took people to an army to fight in Flanders; Catesby should also have offered Littleton a service in this army. After the conspiracy had failed on 5 November 1605, Littleton fled with several of the conspirators to Holbeche House. Once upon a time, Robert Winter was asked if he could not investigate if his father-in-law John Talbot could assist the conspirators, but Wintour refused. Instead, Thomas Wintour and Littleton were allowed to go and investigate this. John Talbot, however, proved to be loyal to King James I and sent away Wintour and Littleton. When they were both on their way back to Holbeche House, they found out that some of the conspirators had died while the rest of them had moved the field. When they received this message, Littleton chose to flee on his own and he urged Wintour to do the same. Wintour did not listen to him but proceeded to Holbeche House, where he saw that the conspirators were alive, but some of them were injured.

Robert Wintour was one of the conspirators who fled from Holbeche House on the night of 7–8 November and he met up with Littleton shortly thereafter. On 9 January 1606 they both were arrested. They had spent two months on a flight where they were hiding in barns and houses and at one time they had to block a drunk hunter who had discovered their hideaway. They were eventually revealed in Humphrey Littleton's home in Hagley Hall since a cook named John Finwood had informed the authorities about their retreat. Humphrey, who had managed to fly from his home in Hagley, was arrested later at Prestwood, Staffordshire. Stephen Littleton was sentenced to death for his actions and was executed sometime in 1606 in Stafford, Staffordshire.

== Bibliography ==
- Fraser, Antonia (2005) [1996], The Gunpowder Plot, Phoenix, ISBN 0-7538-1401-3
- Haynes, Alan (2005) [1994], The Gunpowder Plot: Faith in Rebellion, Hayes and Sutton, ISBN 0-7509-4215-0
- Nicholls, Mark (1991), Investigating Gunpowder plot, Manchester: Manchester University Press, ISBN 0-7190-3225-3
