= Wintour baronets =

Title in the Baronetage of England

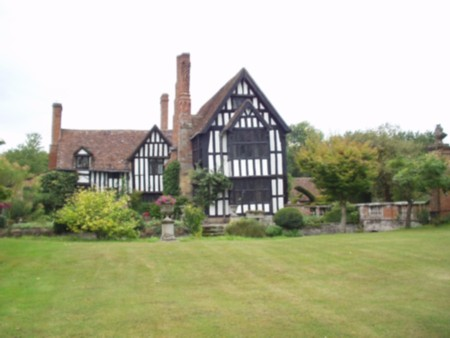
Hodington Court, or Huddington Court, the seat of the Wintour family

The Wintour Baronetcy, of Hodington in the County of Worcester, was a title in the Baronetage of England. It was created on 29 April 1642 for George Wintour. He was childless and the title became extinct on his death in 1658.

== Wintour baronets, of Hodington (1642) ==
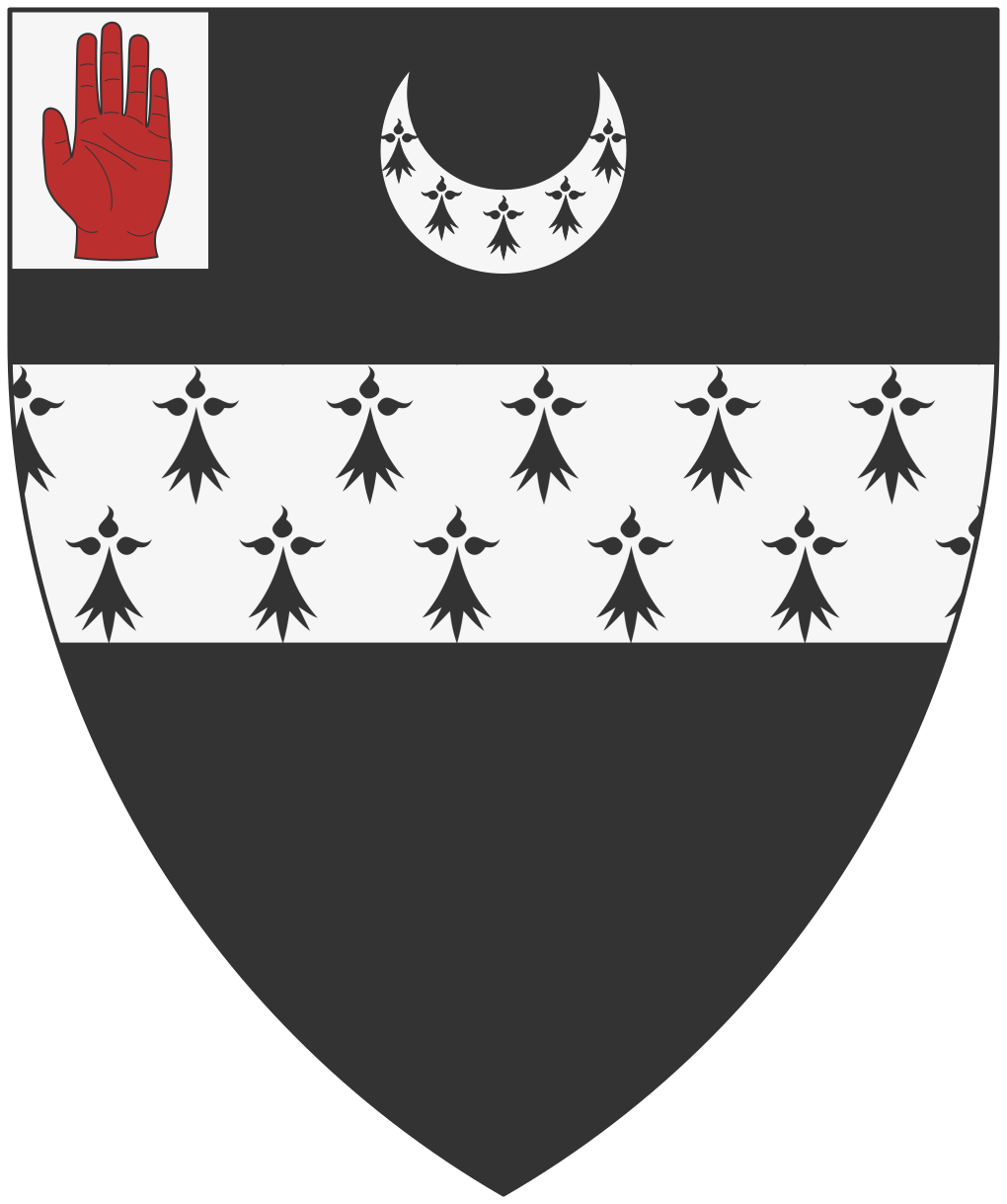
Arms of Wintour of Hodington

- Sir George Wintour, 1st Baronet (died 1658). Wintour was the grandson of Robert Wintour, one of the plotters in the 1605 Gunpowder Plot. He was created baronet, of Hodington in the County of Worcester, in 1642. He married Lady Frances Talbot, daughter of John Talbot, 10th Earl of Shrewsbury and the Honourable Mary Fortescue. He was the last of the Winters to live at Huddington Court. He died without issue on 4 June 1658, when the baronetcy became extinct. Wintour bequeathed his estate to Francis Talbot, 11th Earl of Shrewsbury, and Gilbert Talbot.
