= Humphrey Littleton =

Englishman executed for Gunpower Plot

- Born: 1576; Frankley
- Died: 7 April 1606; Red Hill, Worcester
- Cause of death: Executed
- Children: one son (at least)
- Parent: Sir John Lyttelton

Humphrey Littleton, or Humphrey Lyttelton, (died 7 April 1606) was a member of the Lyttelton family, who was executed for his involvement in the Gunpowder Plot. Robert Wintour and Stephen Lyttelton who had escaped from the fight at Holbeche House were captured at Hagley Park on 9 January 1606 despite Littleton's protests that he was not harbouring anyone. It was Littleton who told the authorities that Edward Oldcorne was hiding at Hindlip Hall after he had given him mass. Wintour, Oldcorne, and both Littletons were all executed.

== Biography ==
Littleton was one of the eight sons of Sir John Lyttelton. He was also the brother of another John Littleton who had been a member of parliament and had died in gaol for his part in the Essex rebellion. John had lost his estates at Hagley, Frankley, Upper Arley and Halesowen. Humphrey came from Frankley. This John left a widow called Muriel or Meriel who lived at Hagley Park, her husband's estates having been restored to her by James I in 1603.

Before the Gunpowder Plot was revealed Littleton had little knowledge of the true nature of the plot to kill the King and Parliament. He understood that Robert Catesby (the leader of the plot) was just raising a regiment to fight in Flanders. Catesby had offered to take one of Littleton's illegitimate sons as his page. Humphrey had been summoned to Dunchurch by Robert Catesby, but following the plot's failure he did not go to his nephew Stephen's Holbeche House with Stephen and the rest of the main plotters. (Stephen was the son of his elder brother George). Later, Stephen came to him with Robert Wintour. The two men had escaped arrest at Holbeche House and were on the run.

Littleton arranged for a tenant farmer to harbour the two fugitives, swearing his own servants to secrecy. The fugitives were captured at Hagley Park on 9 January 1606 because the authorities had been informed of their presence by Littleton's cook, John Fynwood. Despite Littleton's protests that he was not harbouring anyone, a search was made and another servant, David Bate, showed where the two plotters were escaping from a courtyard into the countryside. All three of them were to be tried and executed.

Littleton had visited and taken mass with Father Oldcorne and he let it be known that the priest was at Hindlip Hall. This information was to lead to four more people being caught there in priest holes; Father Oldcorne, Ralph Ashley, Henry Garnet and Nicholas Owen. Ironically Nicholas Owen had constructed the hideaways. Moreover, it was Muriel Littleton's brother who conducted the search of Hindlip Hall.

At Oldcorne's trial Littleton publicly asked for forgiveness and believed that he deserved to die for betraying his friends. Humphrey Littleton died on 7 April 1606; he was hanged, drawn and quartered together with Father Oldcorne, John Wintour, and Ralph Ashley at Red Hill, just outside the city of Worcester. John Perkes, the Hagley tenant farmer, and his servant Thomas Burford, were also executed for aiding the fugitives. Owen had died under torture. Garnet was hanged in London. Stephen Littleton was executed at Stafford.
