= Huddington Court =

15th-century manor house in Worcestershire, England

Coordinates: 52.213839°N 2.085624°W

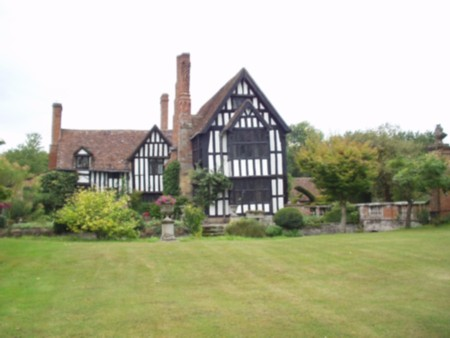
Huddington Court

Huddington Court is a 15th-century moated manor house in the village of Huddington in Worcestershire, England, some six miles east of Worcester. It was described by Sir Nikolaus Pevsner as 'the most picturesque house in Worcestershire'. It was the home of the Wintour family, of which the Gunpowder Plot conspirators Robert, Thomas and John Wintour are the most notorious. The house is a private residence and is not open to the public. It has been Grade I listed on the National Heritage List for England since 1952.

== The Gunpowder Plot ==
The plans of the Gunpowder Plot to blow up the Houses of Parliament in 1605 were, partially, conceived in Huddington Court.

Two priest holes, believed to have been built by Nicholas Owen, are in the building. One is behind an oak panel in what was the chapel, where mass was said by the resident priest. The main section of the hole has another door which leads to a small room where the priest would not have wanted to suffer from claustrophobia! The other hiding hole is in the room opposite and is a door made to look like a part of the wall. This enters into a quite sizeable room that was only discovered in the 1920s.

Following the arrest of Guy Fawkes the plotters fled to Huddington Court and arrived at about 2.00 p.m. on Wednesday 6 November. They left early the following morning in the pouring rain and made it as far as Holbeach House in Staffs where following a shoot out they were killed or arrested. Some had fled and were picked up later, including Robert Wintour who evaded capture for two months. Thomas had been wounded and their half brother, John, surrendered his sword at Dudley Castle. They were all executed. Huddington Court was confiscated along with all their estates. However, it was back in family ownership by 1607, most probably via the payment of large fines by the Talbot estates. Robert's wife, Gertrude, being the daughter of Sir John Talbot of Grafton Manor.

Etched into the glass in the main bedroom of the house are the words "past cark, past care", reputedly carved by Lady Wintour with her diamond ring while her husband hid in the woods around the house before his capture. However, this is untrue and it is in fact by a priest by the name of William Clerke, who was hiding out there in the summer of 1603 following his implication in the Bye Plot. He was arrested in Worcester on 13 August that year and executed in Winchester on 29 November.

== See also ==
- Winter baronets
