= Red Hill, Worcester =

Suburb of Worcester in Worcestershire, England

Coordinates: 52.182803°N 2.193116°W

Red Hill
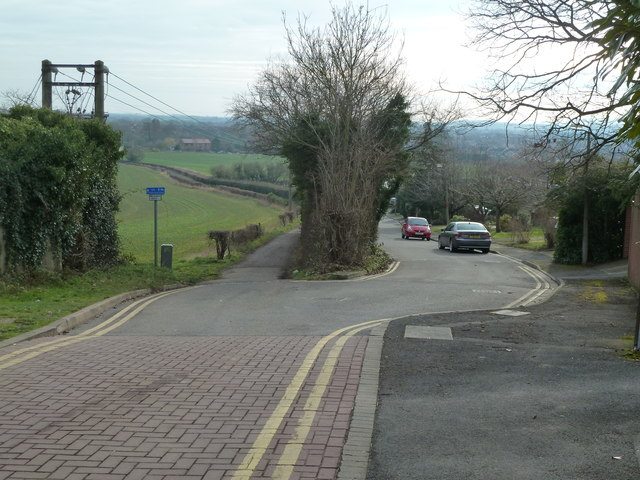
- Red Hill Lane, Red Hill, Worcester

- Location within Worcestershire
  - London: 133 mi (214 km) SE
- District: Worcester
- Shire county: Worcestershire
- Region: West Midlands
- Country: England
- Sovereign state: United Kingdom
- Post town: Worcester
- Postcode district: WR5
- Dialling code: 01905
- Police: West Mercia
- Fire: Hereford and Worcester
- Ambulance: West Midlands
- UK Parliament: Worcester

Red Hill is a southeastern suburb of Worcester in Worcestershire, England. It is on the A44. It has historically been used as a high ground to attack the city and as a place of execution.

== History ==
Red Hill is mentioned regarding King Stephen's attack upon the city of Worcester in 1149. He burnt Worcester and expelled William de Beauchamp, but the castle against which he raised two forts at Red Hill near Digly and Henwicks Hill resisted his attacks. It was said that the remains of this fort could still be seen in 1820.

In the 17th century, it was an area of execution. Edward Oldcorne and Ralph Ashley who had been captured at nearby Hindlip Hall were hanged, drawn and quartered on 7 April 1606. Holy relics of these Jesuit priests are still revered today. The others executed were a tenant farmer named Perkes, Humphrey Littleton and John Wintour. All were executed for involvement with the Gunpowder Plot. Franciscan priest John Wall was executed at Red Hill on 22 August 1679 during the time of Titus Oates's alleged plot.

The hill featured also in the Battle of Worcester in 1651 when it was fought over by Royalist forces and Oliver Cromwell's forces. Cromwell used the heights of Red Hill and Perry Wood to hold his artillery and most of his troops on 29 August 1651. At the time Red Hill was just outside the city gates. The Royalist attacks on the guns were turned back because there was a Worcester spy named Guise. He was caught and hanged.

Red Hill continued to be a place of execution for some time. On 16 August 1805, for instance, it is recorded that W. Dalton was executed for two counts of burglary. It was said that "His demeanor was becoming".
