= Blessed Edward Oldcorne Catholic College =

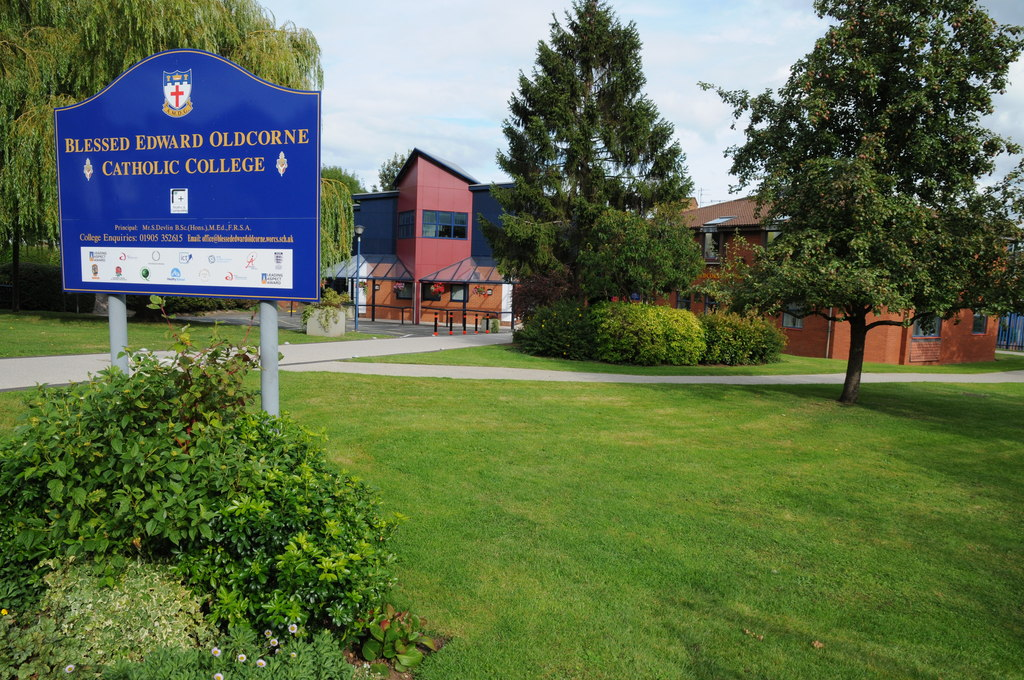

Location
- Timberdine Avenue; Worcester, Worcestershire, WR5 2XD; England; 52°10′57″N 2°12′40″W

Information
- Type: Voluntary aided school
- Mottoes: Ad Moriem De Gloriam (For the greater glory of God); A commitment to Gospel Values and Personal Achievement
- Religious affiliation: Roman Catholic
- Established: 1963
- Local authority: Worcestershire
- Department for Education URN: 116999 Tables
- Ofsted: Reports
- Headteacher: Greg McClarey
- Gender: Coeducational
- Age: 11 to 16
- Enrollment: 1048
- Website: http://www.blessededward.co.uk

Blessed Edward Oldcorne Catholic College is a coeducational Roman Catholic secondary school located in Worcester, England. In 2022 it received an Ofsted rating of Good. The school has around 1050 students.

== History ==
The school was founded by D-Day veteran Frank Doran (born 1924) in 1963, and named after Edward Oldcorne, a Jesuit priest executed in 1606 for his alleged part in the Gunpowder Plot.

== Subjects ==
The school teaches typical subjects such as mathematics, science, and languages.
