= Robert Catesby =

English Gunpowder Plot conspirator (c. 1572–1605)

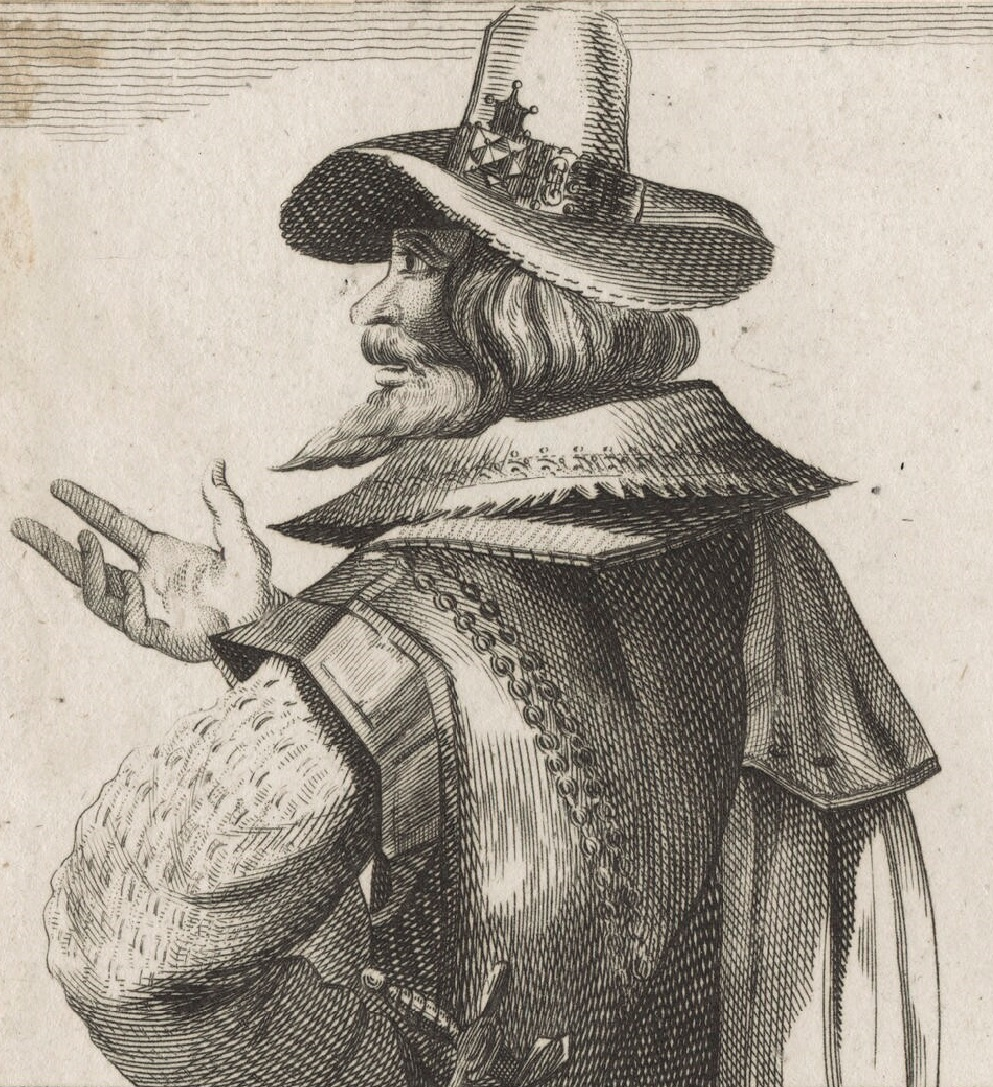
- 1794 portrait
- Born: 3 March 1572; Bushwood Hall, Henley-in-Arden, Warwickshire, England
- Died: 8 November 1605 (aged 32–33); Holbeche House, Dudley, England
- Cause of death: Gunshot wound
- Other names: Mr Roberts, Robin Catesby
- Spouse: Catherine Leigh
- Children: 2
- Motive: Gunpowder Plot, a conspiracy to assassinate King James VI & I and members of the Houses of Parliament
- Penalty: Exhumation, decapitation, impaled head displayed outside Parliament

Details
- Role: Leader

Robert Catesby (3 March 1572 – 8 November 1605) was the leader of a group of English Catholics who planned the failed Gunpowder Plot of 1605. Born in Warwickshire, Catesby was educated at Oxford University. His family were prominent recusant Catholics, and presumably to avoid swearing the Oath of Supremacy he left college before taking his degree. He married a Protestant in 1593 and fathered two children, one of whom survived birth and was baptised in a Protestant church. In 1601 he took part in the Essex Rebellion but was captured and fined, after which he sold his estate at Chastleton.

The Protestant James I, who became King of England in 1603, was less tolerant of Catholics than many persecuted Recusants had hoped. Catesby therefore planned a decapitation strike which he considered tyrannicide, aimed at the Government of England; by blowing up the King and the House of Lords with gunpowder during the State Opening of Parliament. The assassination of the King was to be the prelude to a popular uprising aimed at regime change, through which a Catholic monarch would be seated upon the English throne. Early in 1604, Catesby began to recruit other Catholics to his cause, including Thomas Wintour, John Wright, Thomas Percy, and Guy Fawkes. Over the following months, Fawkes helped to recruit a further eight conspirators into the plot, which, against the pleas of underground Jesuit superior Fr. Henry Garnet to cancel the plot, was scheduled to be carried out on 5 November 1605. Concerns about possible collateral damage caused an anonymous letter of warning to be sent to William Parker, 4th Baron Monteagle, who alerted the authorities. On the night before the planned explosion, Fawkes was arrested underneath the House of Parliament while guarding 38 barrels of gunpowder. News of his arrest caused the other plotters to flee London, warning Catesby along their way.

With a much-diminished group of followers, Catesby made a last stand at Holbeche House in Staffordshire (the modern-day Kingswinford suburb of Wall Heath), against a 200-strong Sheriff's posse led by Richard Walsh. Catesby was mortally wounded by gunfire and later found dead inside Holbeche Hall, where he had died while contemplating a holy card of the Virgin Mary. As a warning to other potential regicides, Catesby's body was exhumed, posthumously executed, and his severed head on a spike was displayed outside the Houses of Parliament.

== Early life ==
=== Origins ===
Arms of Catesby: Argent, two lions passant sable crowned or

He was born after 1572, the third and only surviving son and heir of Sir William Catesby of Lapworth in Warwickshire, by his wife Anne Throckmorton, a daughter of Sir Robert Throckmorton (c.1513–1581), KG, of Coughton Court in Warwickshire (by his second wife, Elizabeth Hussey). He was a lineal descendant of William Catesby (1450–1485), the influential councillor of King Richard III who was captured at the Battle of Bosworth and executed. His parents were prominent recusant Catholics; his father had suffered years of imprisonment for his faith, and in 1581 had been tried in Star Chamber alongside William Vaux, 3rd Baron Vaux of Harrowden, and his brother-in-law Sir Thomas Tresham, for harbouring the Jesuit priest Edmund Campion. The head of the Throckmortons, Sir Thomas Throckmorton, was also fined for his recusancy, and spent many years in prison. Another relation, Sir Francis Throckmorton, had been executed in 1584 for his involvement in a plot to free Mary, Queen of Scots.

=== Education ===
In 1586 Robert was educated at Gloucester Hall in Oxford, a college noted for its Catholic intake. Those either studying at university or wishing to take public office could not do so without first swearing the Oath of Supremacy, an act which would have compromised Catesby's Catholic faith. Presumably to avoid this consequence, he left without taking his degree, and may then have attended the seminary college of Douai. In 1588, at the time of the Spanish Armada, Robert was allegedly imprisoned at Wisbech Castle along with Francis Tresham.

=== Adulthood ===
On 8 May 1592, he married Katherine Leigh, daughter of Sir Thomas Leigh of Stoneleigh Abbey in Warwickshire (1530–1626) and Katherine Spencer (1544–1626), and granddaughter of Sir Thomas Leigh of Stoneleigh Abbey and his wife Alice Barker, sometimes known as Coverdale, who was an heiress, thanks to her uncle Sir Rowland Hill, publisher of the Geneva Bible. (Note: The indenture for this marriage is dated 2 March, and notes that he was not then 21 years old.)

Katherine came from wealthy and respected Protestant families and brought with her a dowry of £2,000, but also a religious association which offered Robert some respite from the recusancy laws then in effect. On the death of his grandmother Katherine in 1593, he came into the family property at Chastleton, in Oxfordshire. The couple's first son William died in infancy, but their second son Robert survived, and was baptised at Chastleton's Anglican parish church on 11 November 1595. (Note: Their son was taken to Ashby St Ledgers, and in later years married Thomas Percy's daughter.) When Catesby's father died in 1598, his estates at Ashby St Ledgers were left to his wife for life, while Catesby and his family remained at Chastleton. Catesby had seemed happy to remain a Church Papist (Note: "Church Papist' was a nickname for those who conformed to the rules of the Anglican Church, but who secretly remained Catholic.) but after his wife's death later that year he further embraced Catholicism.

In 1601 Catesby was involved in Essex's Rebellion. The Earl of Essex's purpose might have lain in furthering his own interests rather than those of the Catholic Church, but Catesby hoped that if Essex succeeded, there might once more be a Catholic monarch. The rebellion was a failure, however, and the wounded Catesby was captured, imprisoned at the Wood Street Counter, and fined 4,000 marks (approximately equivalent to £698,000 in 2025 (Note: The mark was a unit of account equal to two thirds of a pound, 160d or 13s/4d. 4,000 marks is therefore equal to £2,666/13/4.)) by Elizabeth I. Sir Thomas Tresham helped pay some of Catesby's fine and Catesby sold his estate at Chastleton afterwards. Several authors speculate about Catesby's movements as Elizabeth's health grew worse; he was probably among those "principal papists" imprisoned by a government fearing open rebellion, and in March 1603 he possibly sent Christopher Wright to Spain to see if Philip III would continue to support English Catholics after Elizabeth's death. (Note: Wright might have used the alias Anthony Dutton.) Catesby funded the activities of some Jesuit priests, and while visiting them made occasional use of the alias Mr Roberts.

== Gunpowder Plot ==
=== Background ===
Catholics had hoped that the persecution they suffered during Elizabeth's reign would end when she was succeeded in 1603 by James I. His mother, Mary, Queen of Scots (executed in 1587), had been a devout Catholic, and James's attitude appeared moderate, even tolerant towards Catholics. Protestant rulers across Europe had, however, been the target of several assassination attempts during the late 16th century, and until the 1620s some English Catholics believed that regicide was justifiable to remove 'tyrants' from power. Much of James's political writing was concerned with such matters, and the "refutation of the [Catholic] argument that 'faith did not need to be kept with heretics'". Shortly after he discovered that his wife Anne–who had been raised Lutheran and had abstained from the Anglican communion at her English coronation–had been sent a rosary from Pope Clement VIII, James exiled all Jesuits and other Catholic priests, and reimposed the collection of anti-Catholic fines. Catesby soon began to lose patience with the new dynasty.

British author and historian Antonia Fraser describes Catesby's mentality as "that of the crusader who does not hesitate to employ the sword in the cause of values which he considers are spiritual". Writing after the events of 1604–1606, the Jesuit priest Father Tesimond's description of his friend was favourable: "his countenance was exceedingly noble and expressive... his conversation and manners were peculiarly attractive and imposing, and that by the dignity of his character he exercised an irresistible influence over the minds of those who associated with him." Fellow conspirator Ambrose Rookwood, shortly before his own death, said that he "loved and respected him [Catesby] as his own life", while Catesby's friend, Father John Gerard, claimed he was "respected in all companies of such as are counted there swordsmen or men of action", and that "few were in the opinions of most men preferred before him and he increased much his acquaintance and friends." Author Mark Nicholls suggests that "bitterness at the failure of Essex's design nevertheless seems to have sharpened an already well-honed neurosis."

=== Early stages ===
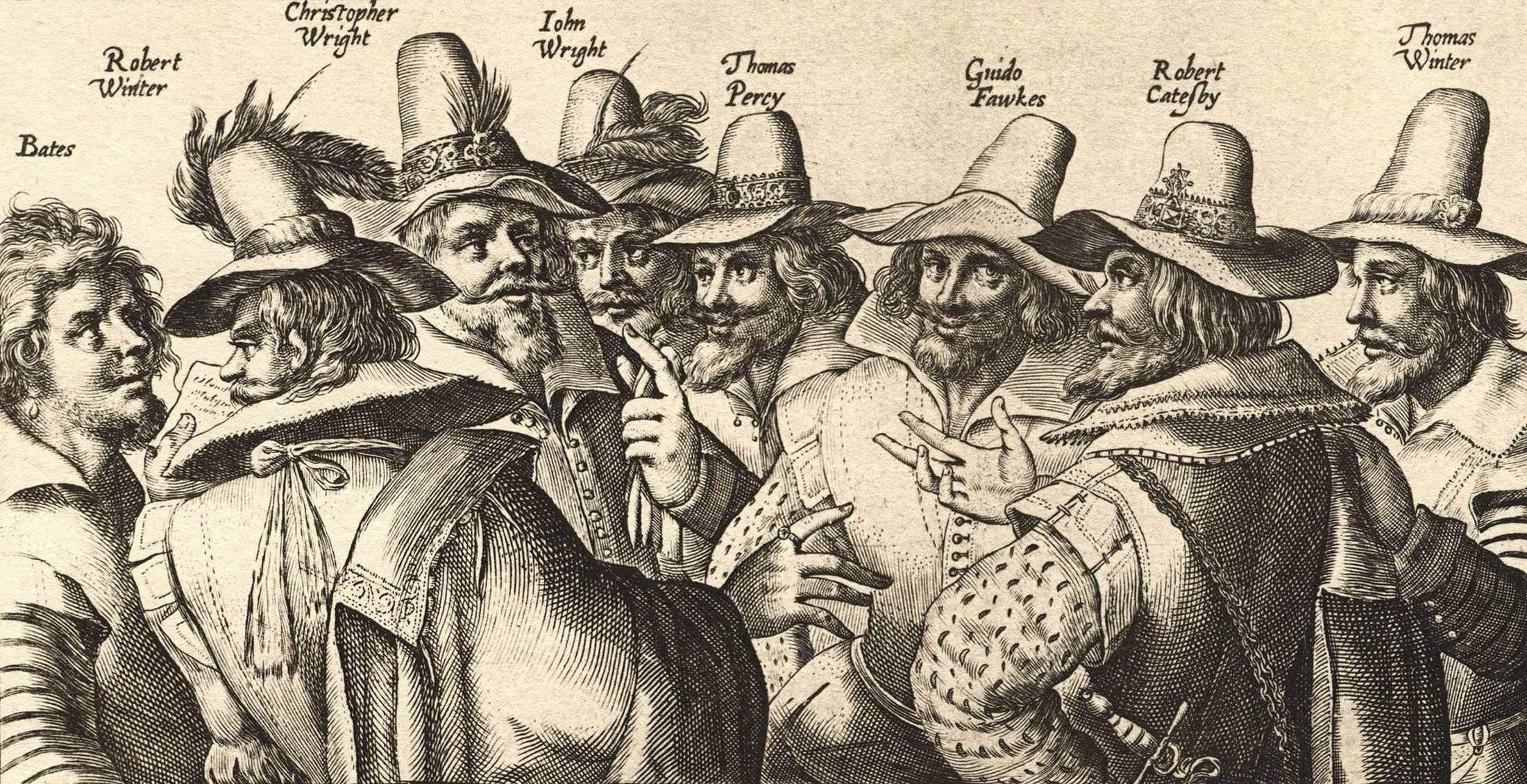
A contemporary engraving of eight of the 13 conspirators, by Crispijn van de Passe; Catesby is second from right

Despite the ease with which Catesby seems to have inspired his fellow conspirators, the fact it was he and not Fawkes (today most often associated with 5 November) who devised what became known as the Gunpowder Plot has largely been forgotten. The precise date on which he set events in motion is unknown, but he first likely had the idea early in 1604. Sometime around June of the previous year he was visited by his friend Thomas Percy. A great-grandson of the 4th Earl of Northumberland, Percy was reported to have had a "wild youth" before he became a Catholic, and during Elizabeth's final years had been entrusted by the 9th Earl with a secret mission to James's court in Scotland, to plead with the king on behalf of England's Catholics. He now complained bitterly about what he considered to be James's treachery and threatened to kill him. Catesby replied, "No, no, Tom, thou shalt not venture to small purpose, but if thou wilt be a traitor thou shalt be to some great advantage." Percy listened while Catesby added, "I am thinking of the surest way and I will soon let thee know what it is." During Allhallowtide on 31 October he sent for his cousin Thomas Wintour, who was at Huddington Court in Worcestershire with his brother Robert. Thomas was educated as a lawyer and had fought for England in the Low Countries, but in 1600 had converted to Catholicism. After the Earl of Essex's failed rebellion, he had travelled to Spain to raise support for English Catholics, a mission which the authorities later said comprised part of a 'Spanish Treason'. Although Thomas declined his invitation, Catesby again invited him in February 1601.

When Wintour responded to the summons he found his cousin with the swordsman John Wright. Catesby told him of his plan to kill the king and his government by blowing up "the Parliament House with Gunpowder... in that place have they done us all the mischief, and perchance God hath designed that place for their punishment". Wintour at first objected to his cousin's scheme, but Catesby, who said that "the nature of the disease required so sharp a remedy", won him over. Despite Catholic Spain's moves toward diplomacy with England, Catesby still harboured hopes of foreign support and a peaceful solution. Wintour, therefore, returned to the continent, where he tried unsuccessfully to persuade the affable Constable of Castile to press for good terms for English Catholics in forthcoming peace negotiations. He then turned to Sir William Stanley, an English Catholic and veteran commander who had switched sides from England to Spain, and the exiled Welsh spy Hugh Owen; both cast doubt on the plotters' chances of receiving Spanish support. Owen did, however, introduce Wintour to Guy Fawkes, whose name Catesby had already supplied as "a confidant gentleman" who might enter their ranks. Fawkes was a devout English Catholic who had travelled to the continent to fight for Spain in the Dutch War of Independence. Wintour told him of their plan to "doe somewhat in England if the pece with Spaine helped us nott", and thus in April 1604 the two men returned home. Wintour told Catesby that despite positive noises from the Spanish, he feared that "the deeds would not answer". That was a response which in Nicholls's opinion came as no surprise to Catesby, who wanted and expected nothing less. (Note: Philip III made peace with England in August 1604.)

On Sunday 20 May in the well-to-do Strand district of London, Catesby met Thomas Wintour, John Wright, Thomas Percy and Guy Fawkes, at an inn called the Duck and Drake. Percy had been introduced to the plot several weeks after Wintour and Fawkes's return to England. Alone in a private room, all swore an oath of secrecy on a prayer book, and then in another room celebrated Mass with the Jesuit priest (and friend to Catesby) John Gerard. Robert Keyes was admitted to the group in October 1604, and was charged with looking after Catesby's Lambeth house, where the gunpowder and other supplies were to be stored. Two months later (Note: According to Bates's confession.) Catesby recruited his servant, Thomas Bates, into the plot, after Bates accidentally became aware of it and by March 1605, three more were admitted: Thomas Wintour's brother Robert, John Grant, and John Wright's brother Christopher.

=== Further recruitment ===
Although the State Opening of Parliament was planned for February 1605, concern over the plague delayed it until 3 October. A contemporaneous government account has the plotters engaged in digging a tunnel beneath Parliament by December 1604, but no other evidence exists to prove this, and no trace of a tunnel has since been found. If the story is true, the plotters ceased their efforts when the tenancy to the undercroft beneath the House of Lords became available. Several months later, early in June 1605, Catesby met the principal Jesuit in England, Father Henry Garnet, on Thames Street in London. While discussing the war in Flanders, Catesby asked about the morality of "killing innocents". Garnet said that such actions could often be excused, but according to his own account during a second meeting in July he showed Catesby a letter from the pope which forbade rebellion. Catesby replied, "Whatever I mean to do, if the Pope knew, he would not hinder for the general good of our country." Father Garnet's protestations prompted Catesby's next reply, "I am not bound to take knowledge by you of the Pope's will." Soon after, Father Tesimond told Father Garnet that while taking Catesby's confession (Note: Haynes (2005) writes that Tesimond took Thomas Bates' confession.) he had learned of the plot. Father Garnet met with Catesby a third time on 24 July at White Webbs in Enfield Chase, the home of Catesby's wealthy relative Anne Vaux, and a house long suspected by the government of harbouring Jesuit priests. Without acknowledging that he was aware of the precise nature of the plot, the priest tried in vain to dissuade Catesby from his course.

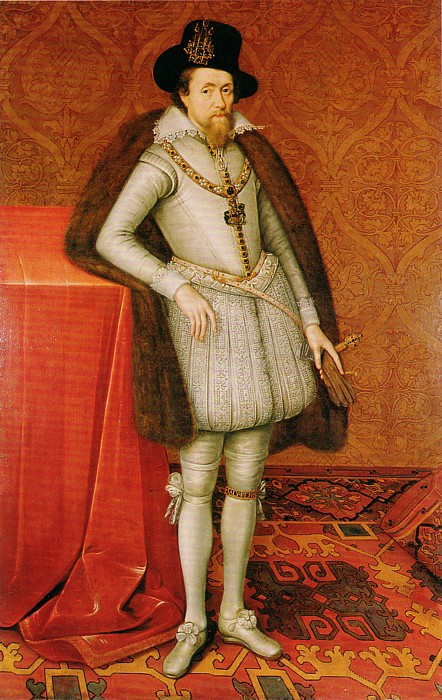
James I, by John de Critz, c. 1606

By 20 July 1605, 36 barrels of gunpowder had been stored in the undercroft, but the ever-present threat of the plague yet again prorogued the opening of Parliament, this time until 5 November 1605. Catesby had borne much of the scheme's financial cost thus far, and was running out of money. As their plans moved closer to fruition, during a secret meeting at Bath in August at which he, Percy and Thomas Wintour were present, the plotters decided that "the company being yet but few" he was to be allowed to "call in whom he thought best". Catesby soon added Ambrose Rookwood, a staunch Catholic who was both young and wealthy, but who most importantly owned a stable of fine horses at Coldham. For the plan to work Rookwood and his horses needed to be close to the other conspirators, and so Catesby persuaded him to rent Clopton House at Stratford-upon-Avon. Francis Tresham was brought into the plot on 14 October. Also descended from William Catesby, Tresham was Robert's cousin, (Note: Anne Throckmorton was sister to Meriel Throckmorton, Tresham's mother.) and as young children the two had often visited White Webbs. Although his account of the meeting is weighted with hindsight (when captured he sought to distance himself from the affair), he asked Catesby what support for the Catholics would be forthcoming once the king had been killed. Catesby's answer, "The necessity of the Catholics [was such that] it must needs be done", in Fraser's opinion this demonstrates his unwavering view on the matter, held at least since his first meeting with Thomas Wintour early in 1604. The final conspirator to be brought in was Everard Digby, on 21 October, at Harrowden. Catesby confided in Digby during a delayed Feast of Saint Luke. Like Rookwood, Digby was young and wealthy, and possessed a stable of horses. Catesby told him to rent Coughton Court near Alcester, so that he would "the better to be able to do good to the cause [kidnap Princess Elizabeth]".

The day after Tresham's recruitment, Catesby exchanged greetings in London with Fawkes's former employer, Lord Montagu, and asked him "The Parliament, I think, brings your lordship up now?" Montagu told him that he was visiting a relative, and that he would be at Parliament in a few weeks' time. Catesby replied "I think your Lordship takes no pleasure to be there". Montagu, who had already been imprisoned for speaking out in the House of Lords against anti-Catholic legislation, and who had no inclination to be present while more laws were introduced, agreed. After the plot's failure he became a suspect and was arrested, but after intense lobbying he was released some months later.

The recruitment of Rookwood, Tresham, and Digby coincided with a series of meetings in various taverns across London, during which the last remaining details were worked out. Fawkes would light the fuse, and escape by boat across the Thames. An uprising would be started in the Midlands and during it Princess Elizabeth captured. Fawkes would escape to the continent and explain to the Catholic powers what had happened in England.

=== Monteagle letter ===
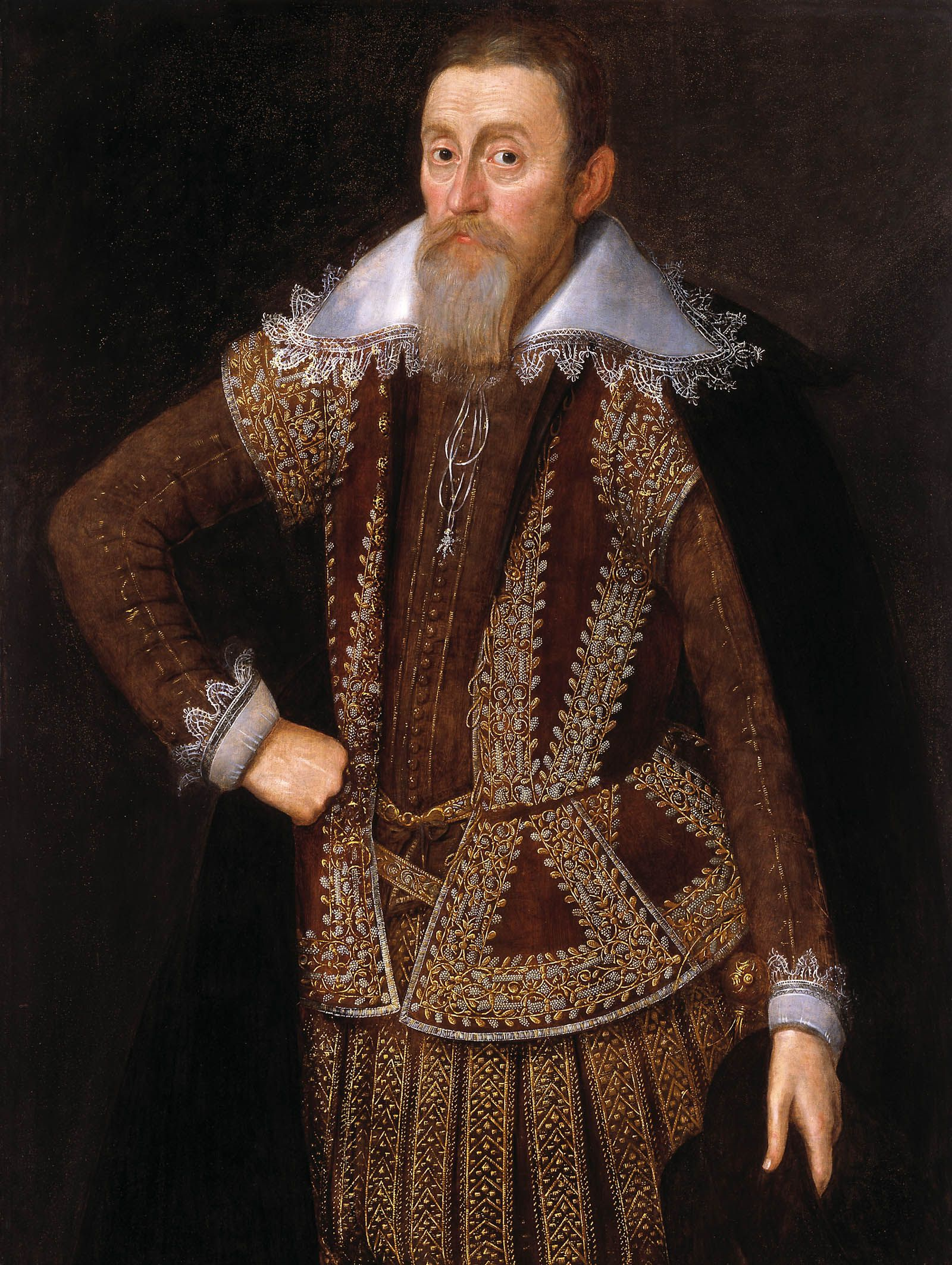
William Parker, Baron Monteagle, by John de Critz, c. 1615

Several of the conspirators expressed worries about fellow Catholics who would be caught up in the planned explosion; Percy was concerned for his patron, Northumberland, and when the young Earl of Arundel's name was mentioned Catesby suggested that a minor wound might keep him from the chamber on that day. Keyes's suggestion to warn the Earl of Peterborough was, however, derided. On 26 October, William Parker, 4th Baron Monteagle (Tresham's brother-in-law) received an anonymous letter while at his house in Hoxton, warning him not to attend Parliament, and forecasting that "they shall receive a terrible blow this Parliament; and yet they shall not see who hurts them". Uncertain of its meaning he delivered it to Secretary of State Robert Cecil, 1st Earl of Salisbury. In an extraordinary act of bravado Catesby had planned to go hunting with James, but was warned of the betrayal by Monteagle's servant. He immediately suspected that Tresham was responsible for the letter, a view which was shared by Thomas Wintour. Together the two confronted the recently recruited conspirator, and threatened to "hang him", but Tresham managed to convince the pair that he had not written the letter, and the next day urged them to abandon the plot.

Catesby waited for Percy's return from the north, before making his decision. He thought the letter too vague to constitute any meaningful threat to the plan, and decided to forge ahead. As Fawkes made a final check on the gunpowder, other conspirators took up their positions in the Midlands. Salisbury, already aware of certain stirrings before he received the letter, did not yet know the exact nature of the plot or who exactly was involved. He elected to wait, to see how events unfolded. On 3 November, Catesby met with Wintour and Percy in London. Although the nature of their discussion is unknown, Fraser theorises that some adjustment of their plan to abduct Princess Elizabeth may have occurred, as later accounts told how Percy had been seen at the Duke of York's lodgings, enquiring as to the movements of the king's daughter. Nicholls mentions that a week earlier—on the same day that Monteagle received his letter—Catesby was at White Webbs with Fawkes, to discuss kidnapping Prince Henry rather than Princess Elizabeth. (Note: Catesby had heard from Wintour that Prince Henry would not be at the opening of Parliament.)

== Death ==
Late on Monday 4 November, Catesby, John Wright and Bates left for the Midlands, ready for the planned uprising. That night Fawkes was discovered guarding the gunpowder in the undercroft beneath the House of Lords. As news of his arrest spread, the next day most of the conspirators still in London fled. Catesby's party, ignorant of what was happening in London, paused at Dunstable when his horse lost a shoe. When Rookwood caught them up and broke to them the news of Fawkes's arrest, the group, which now included Rookwood, Catesby, Bates, the Wright brothers and Percy, rode toward Dunchurch. At about 6:00 pm that evening they reached Catesby's family home at Ashby St Ledgers, where his mother and Robert Wintour were staying. To keep his mother ignorant of their situation, Catesby sent a message asking Wintour to meet him at the edge of the town. The group continued to Dunchurch, where they met Digby and his hunting party and informed them that the king and Salisbury were dead, thus persuading them to continue with the plan.

On 6 November, they raided Warwick Castle for supplies, taking cavalry horses from the stables to aid their escape, before continuing to Norbrook to collect stored weapons. From there they continued their journey to Huddington. Catesby gave Bates a letter to deliver to Father Garnet and the other priests at Coughton Court, informing them of what had transpired, and asking for their help in raising an army in Wales, where Catholic support was believed to be strong. The priest begged Catesby and his followers to stop their "wicked actions" and to listen to the pope's preachings. Father Garnet fled, and managed to evade capture for several weeks. Catesby and the others arrived at Huddington at about 2:00 pm, and were met by Thomas Wintour. Terrified of being associated with the fugitives, family members and former friends showed them no sympathy.

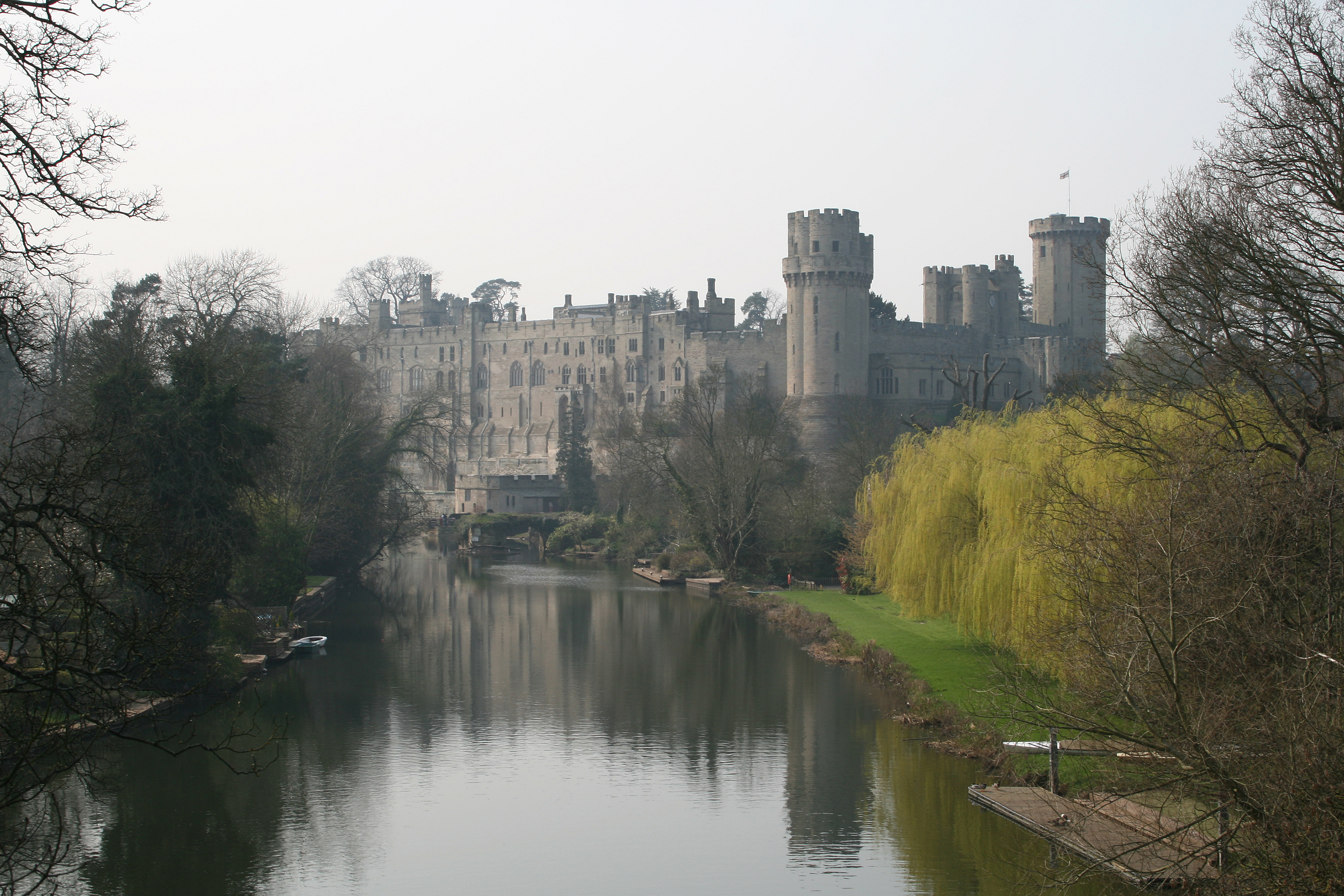
On 6 November 1605, the fugitives raided Warwick Castle for supplies.

Back in London, under pain of torture Fawkes had started to reveal what he knew, and on 7 November the government named Catesby as a wanted man. Early that morning at Huddington, the remaining outlaws went to confession, before taking the sacrament—in Fraser's opinion, a sign that none of them thought they had long to live. The party of fugitives, which included those at the centre of the plot, their supporters and Digby's hunting party, by now had dwindled to only thirty-six in number. They continued through pouring rain to Hewell Grange, home of the young Lord Thomas Windsor. He was absent however, so they helped themselves to further arms, ammunition, and money. The locals were unsupportive; on hearing that Catesby's party stood for "God and Country", they replied that they were for "King James as well as God and Country". The party reached Holbeche House, on the Staffordshire boundary, at about 10:00 pm. Tired and desperate, they spread in front of the fire some of the wet gunpowder taken from Hewell Grange, to dry out. Although gunpowder does not explode (unless physically contained), a spark from the fire landed on the powder and the resultant flames engulfed Catesby, Rookwood, Grant, and another man.

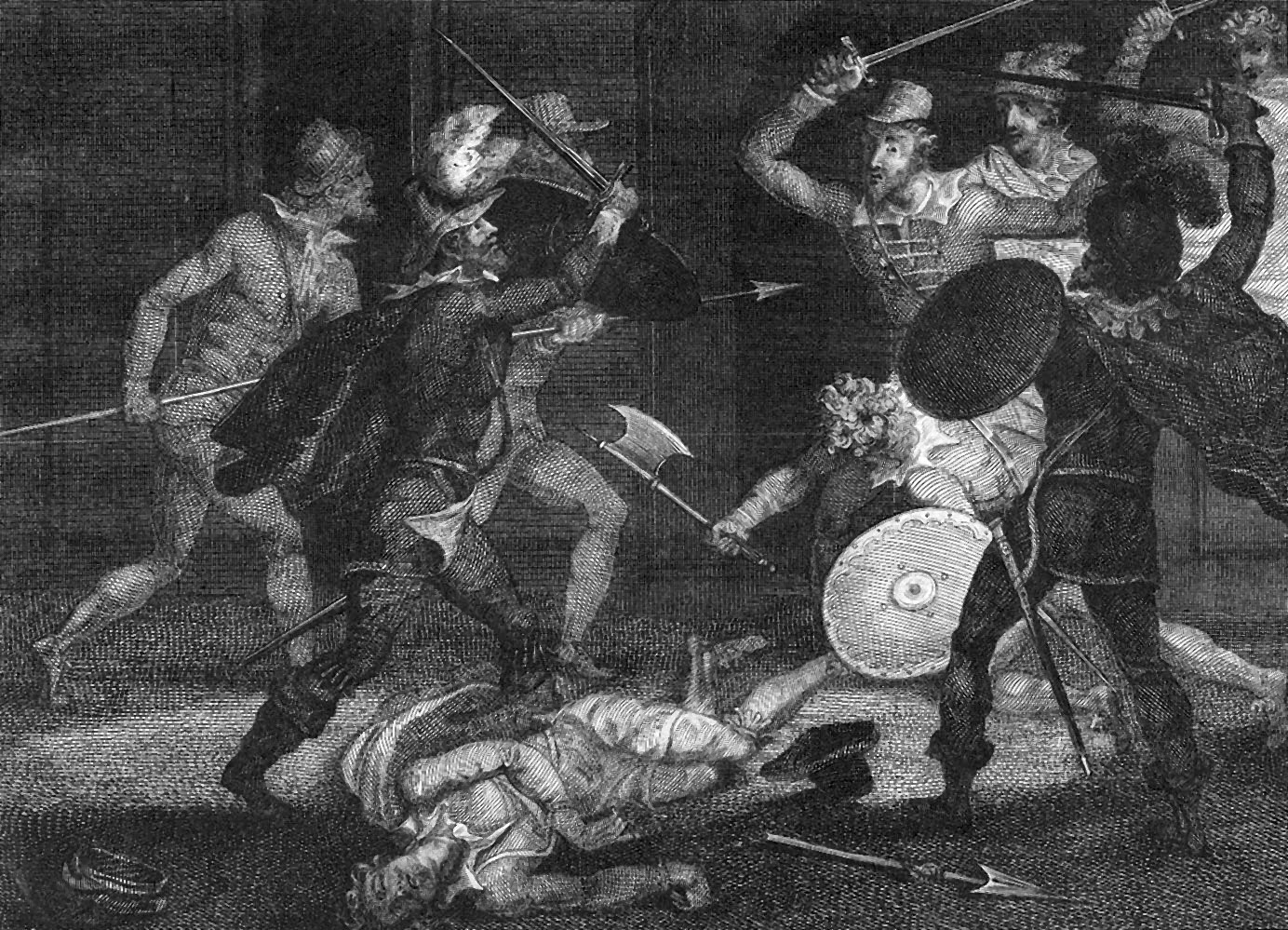
Percy and Catesby slain in attempting their escape from Holbeach, unknown artist

Catesby survived, albeit scorched. Digby left, ostensibly to give himself up, as did John Wintour. Thomas Bates fled, along with Robert Wintour. Remaining were Catesby (described as "reasonably well"), Rookwood, the Wright brothers, Percy and John Grant, who had been so badly injured that his eyes were "burnt out". They resolved to stay in the house and wait for the arrival of the king's men. Catesby, believing his death to be near, kissed the gold crucifix he wore around his neck and said he had given everything for "the honour of the Cross". He refused to be taken prisoner, "against that only he would defend himself with his sword".

Richard Walsh, Sheriff of Worcester, and his company of 200 men besieged Holbeche House at about 11:00 am on 8 November. While crossing the courtyard Thomas Wintour was hit in the shoulder. John Wright was shot, followed by his brother, and then Rookwood. Catesby and Percy were reportedly both dropped by a single lucky shot, while standing near the door. Catesby managed to crawl inside the house, where his body was later found, clutching a picture of the Virgin Mary. That and his gold crucifix were sent to London, to demonstrate what "superstitious and Popish idols" had inspired the plotters. The survivors were taken into custody and the dead buried near Holbeche. On the orders of the Earl of Northampton, the bodies of Catesby and Percy were exhumed and decapitated. John Harington made an opportune study of the heads while en route to London, and later reflected: "more terrible countenances were never looked upon". Placed on "the side of the Parliament House", Catesby's head on a spike became one of the "sightless spectators of their own failure". Catesby and the other plotters were declared guilty by an Act of Attainder passed by Parliament in 1605 (without a trial). All of their property was thus forfeit to the Crown and could not be passed by will. Robert Catesby's mother Anne was able to remain in Ashby St Legers due to her life interest, but after her death that property also passed to James I.

== Notable relatives ==
Modern actor and producer Kit Harington is reputedly a direct descendant of Robert Catesby, others report the direct line died out with the younger Robert Catesby. Harington and co-creators Ronan Bennett and Daniel West, produced a three-part dramatisation called Gunpowder with the BBC delving into Catesby's role as the mastermind of the Gunpowder Plot, with Harington himself starring as Catesby.

== In popular culture ==
Nicola Cornick's novel The Winter Garden (HarperCollins, 2022) is a time slip novel in which Catesby and his wife and mother are characters.
