= Guy Fawkes =

English participant in the Gunpowder Plot (1570–1606)

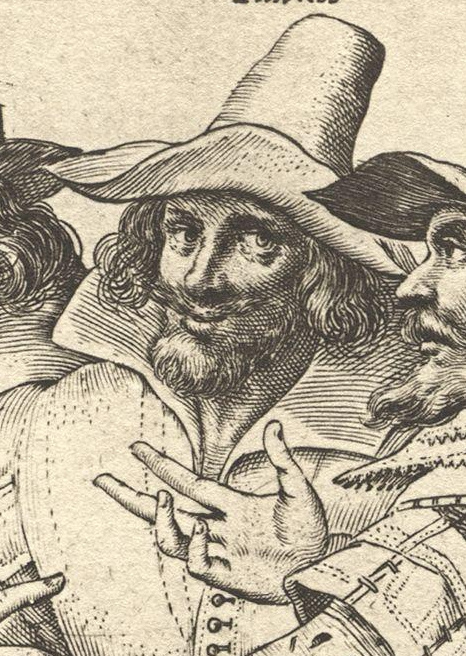
- An engraving of Fawkes from 1605
- Born: 13 April 1570 (presumed); York, England
- Died: 31 January 1606 (aged 35); Westminster, England
- Other names: Guido Fawkes, John Johnson
- Occupations: Soldier, alférez
- Status: Executed
- Motive: Gunpowder Plot, a conspiracy to assassinate King James VI and I and members of the Houses of Parliament
- Conviction: High treason
- Penalty: Hanged, drawn and quartered

Details
- Role: Explosives
- Enlisted: 20 May 1604
- Date apprehended: 5 November 1605

Signature
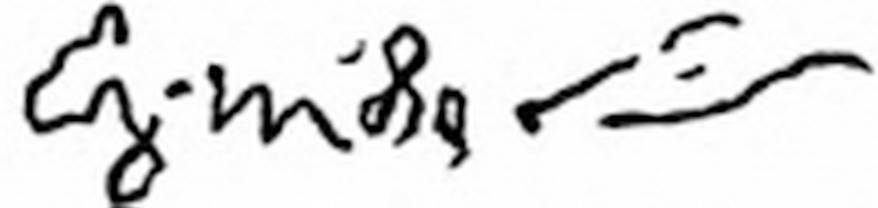

Guy Fawkes (/fɔːks/; 13 April 1570 – 31 January 1606), (Note: Dates in this article before 14 September 1752 are given in the Julian calendar. The beginning of the year is treated as 1 January even though it began in England on 25 March.) also known as Guido Fawkes while fighting for the Spanish, was a member of a group of provincial English Catholics involved in the failed Gunpowder Plot of 1605. He was born and educated in York; his father died when Fawkes was eight years old, after which his mother married a recusant Catholic.

Fawkes converted to Catholicism and left for mainland Europe, where he fought for Catholic Spain in the Eighty Years' War against Protestant Dutch reformers in the Low Countries. He travelled to Spain to seek support for a Catholic rebellion in England without success. He later met Thomas Wintour, with whom he returned to England. Wintour introduced him to Robert Catesby, who planned to assassinate King James I and restore a Catholic monarch to the throne. The plotters leased an undercroft beneath the House of Lords; Fawkes was placed in charge of the gunpowder that they stockpiled there. The authorities were prompted by an anonymous letter to search Westminster Palace during the early hours of 5 November, and they found Fawkes guarding the explosives. He was questioned and tortured over the next few days and confessed to wanting to blow up the House of Lords.

Fawkes was sentenced to be hanged, drawn and quartered. However, at his execution on 31 January, he died when his neck was broken as he was hanged, with some sources claiming that he deliberately jumped to make this happen; he thus avoided the agony of his sentence. He became synonymous with the Gunpowder Plot, the failure of which has been commemorated in the UK as Guy Fawkes Night since 5 November 1605, when his effigy is traditionally burned on a bonfire, commonly accompanied by fireworks.

== Early life ==
=== Childhood ===
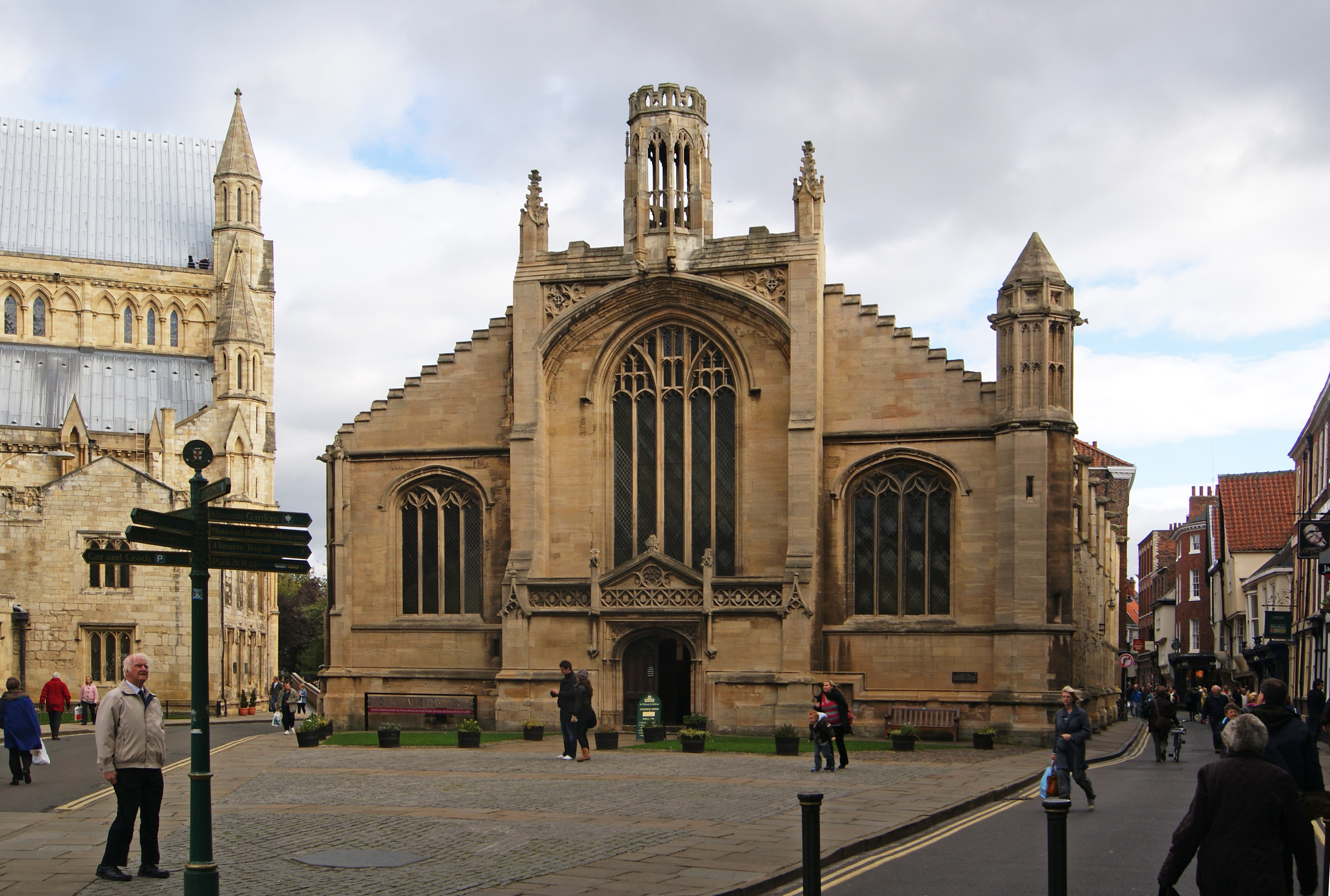
Fawkes was baptised on 16 April 1570 at the church of St Michael le Belfrey, York, next to York Minster (seen at left).

Guy Fawkes was born in 1570 in Stonegate, York. He was the second of four children born to Edward Fawkes, a proctor and an advocate of the consistory court at York, (Note: According to one source, he may have been Registrar of the Exchequer Court of the Archbishop.) and his wife, Edith. (Note: Fawkes's mother's maiden name is alternatively given as Edith Blake, or Edith Jackson.) Guy's parents were regular communicants of the Church of England, as were his paternal grandparents; his grandmother, born Ellen Harrington, was the daughter of a prominent merchant, who served as Lord Mayor of York in 1536. Guy's mother's family were recusant Catholics, and his cousin, Richard Cowling, became a Jesuit priest. Guy was an uncommon name in England, but may have been popular in York on account of a local notable, Sir Guy Fairfax of Steeton.

The date of Fawkes's birth is unknown, but he was baptised in the church of St Michael le Belfrey, York on 16 April. As the customary gap between birth and baptism was three days, he was probably born about 13 April. In 1568, Edith had given birth to a daughter named Anne, but the child died aged about seven weeks, in November that year. She bore two more children after Guy: Anne (b. 1572), and Elizabeth (b. 1575). Both were married, in 1599 and 1594, respectively.

In 1579, when Guy was eight years old, his father died. His mother remarried several years later, to the Catholic Dionis Baynbrigge (or Denis Bainbridge) of Scotton, Harrogate. Fawkes may have become a Catholic through the Baynbrigge family's recusant tendencies, and also the Catholic branches of the Pulleyn and Percy families of Scotton, but also from his time at St. Peter's School in York. A governor of the school had spent about 20 years in prison for recusancy, and its headmaster, John Pulleyn, came from a family of noted Yorkshire recusants, the Pulleyns of Blubberhouses. In her 1915 work The Pulleynes of Yorkshire, author Catharine Pullein suggested that Fawkes's Catholic education came from his Harrington relatives, who were known for harbouring priests, one of whom later accompanied Fawkes to Flanders in 1592–93. Fawkes's fellow students included John Wright and his brother Christopher (both later involved with Fawkes in the Gunpowder Plot) and Oswald Tesimond, Edward Oldcorne and Robert Middleton, who became priests (the latter executed in 1601).

After leaving school Fawkes entered the service of Anthony Browne, 1st Viscount Montagu. The Viscount took a dislike to Fawkes and after a short time dismissed him; he was subsequently employed by Anthony-Maria Browne, 2nd Viscount Montagu, who succeeded his grandfather at the age of 18. At least one source claims that Fawkes married and had a son, but no known contemporary accounts confirm this. (Note: According to the International Genealogical Index, compiled by the LDS Church, Fawkes married Maria Pulleyn (b. 1569) in Scotton in 1590, and had a son, Thomas, on 6 February 1591. These entries, however, appear to derive from a secondary source and not from actual parish entries.)

=== Military career ===
In October 1591 Fawkes sold the estate in Clifton in York that he had inherited from his father. (Note: Although the Oxford Dictionary of National Biography claims 1592, multiple alternative sources give 1591 as the date. Peter Beal, A Dictionary of English Manuscript Terminology, 1450 to 2000, includes a signed indenture of the sale of the estate dated 14 October 1591. (pp. 198–199)) He travelled to the continent to fight in the Eighty Years' War for Catholic Spain against the new Dutch Republic and, from 1595 until the Peace of Vervins in 1598, France. Although England was not by then engaged in land operations against Spain, the two countries were still at war, and the attempted invasion of England, led by the Spanish Armada in 1588, was only five years in the past. He joined Sir William Stanley, an English Catholic and veteran commander in his mid-forties who had raised an army in Ireland to fight in Leicester's expedition to the Netherlands. Stanley had been held in high regard by Elizabeth I, but following his surrender of Deventer to the Spanish in 1587 he, and most of his troops, had switched sides to serve Spain. Fawkes became an alférez or junior officer, fought well at the siege of Calais in 1596, and by 1603 had been recommended for a captaincy. That year, he travelled to Spain to seek support for a Catholic rebellion in England. He used the occasion to adopt the Italian version of his name, Guido, and in his memorandum described James I (who became king of England that year) as "a heretic", who intended "to have all of the Papist sect driven out of England". He denounced Scotland, and the king's favourites among the Scottish nobles, writing "it will not be possible to reconcile these two nations, as they are, for very long". Although he was received politely, the court of Philip III was unwilling to offer him any support.

== Gunpowder Plot ==
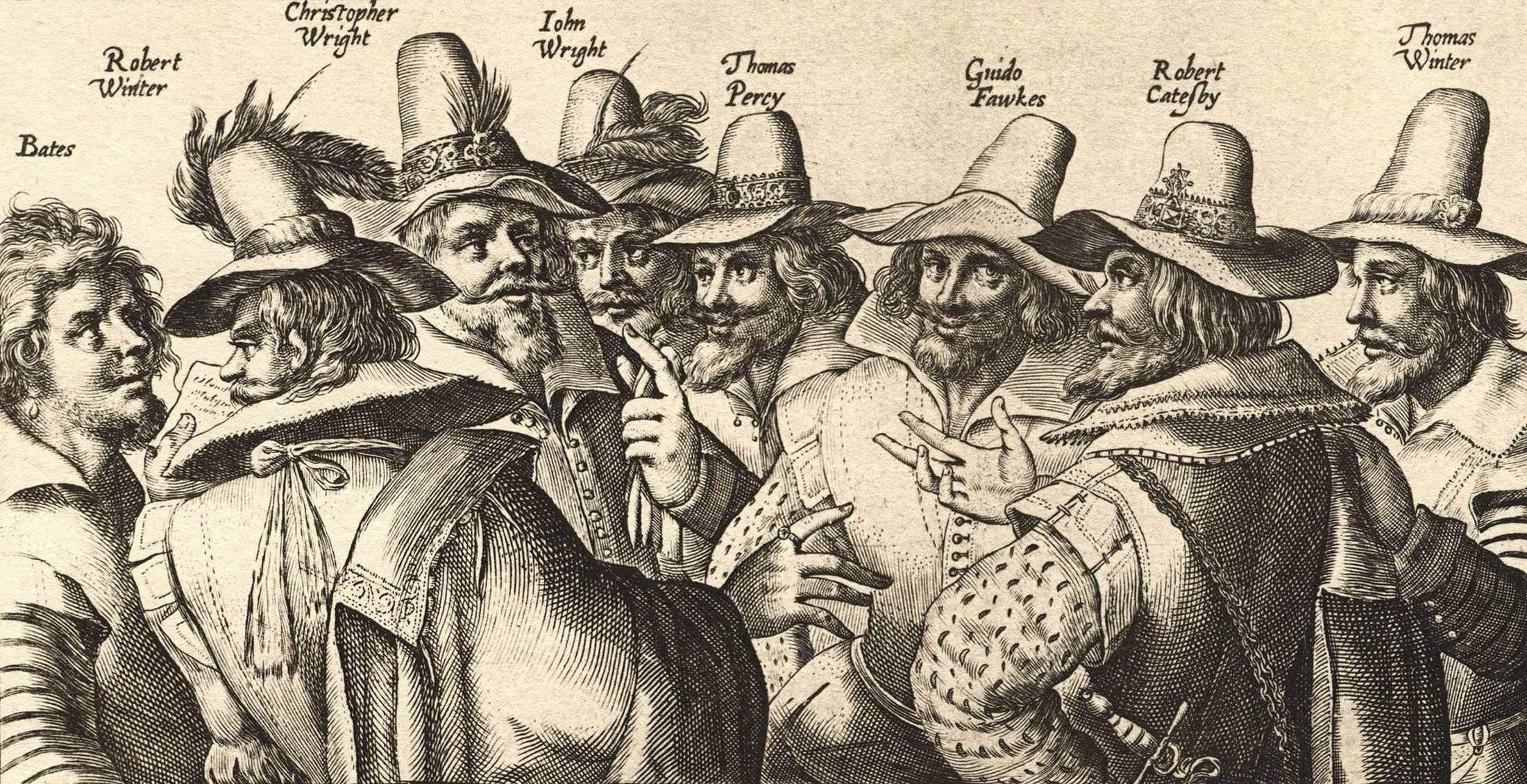
Engraving of eight of the thirteen conspirators, by Crispijn van de Passe. Fawkes is third from the right.

In 1604 Fawkes became involved with a small group of English Catholics, led by Robert Catesby, who planned to assassinate the Protestant King James and replace him with his daughter, third in the line of succession, Princess Elizabeth. Fawkes was described by the Jesuit priest and former school friend Oswald Tesimond as "pleasant of approach and cheerful of manner, opposed to quarrels and strife ... loyal to his friends". Tesimond also claimed Fawkes was "a man highly skilled in matters of war", and that it was this mixture of piety and professionalism that endeared him to his fellow conspirators. The author Antonia Fraser describes Fawkes as "a tall, powerfully built man, with thick reddish-brown hair, a flowing moustache in the tradition of the time, and a bushy reddish-brown beard", and that he was "a man of action ... capable of intelligent argument as well as physical endurance, somewhat to the surprise of his enemies."

The first meeting of the five central conspirators took place on Sunday 20 May 1604, at an inn called the Duck and Drake, in the fashionable Strand district of London. (Note: Also present were fellow conspirators John Wright, Thomas Percy, and Thomas Wintour (with whom he was already acquainted).) Catesby had already proposed at an earlier meeting with Thomas Wintour and John Wright to kill the king and his government by blowing up "the Parliament House with gunpowder". Wintour, who at first objected to the plan, was convinced by Catesby to travel to the continent to seek help. Wintour met with the Constable of Castile, the exiled Welsh spy Hugh Owen, and Sir William Stanley, who said that Catesby would receive no support from Spain. Owen did, however, introduce Wintour to Fawkes, who had by then been away from England for many years, and thus was largely unknown in the country. Wintour and Fawkes were contemporaries; each was militant, and had first-hand experience of the unwillingness of the Spaniards to help. Wintour told Fawkes of their plan to "doe some whatt in Ingland if the pece with Spaine healped us nott", and thus in April 1604 the two men returned to England. Wintour's news did not surprise Catesby; despite positive noises from the Spanish authorities, he feared that "the deeds would nott answere". (Note: Philip III made peace with England in August 1604.)

One of the conspirators, Thomas Percy, was appointed a Gentleman Pensioner in June 1604, gaining access to a house in London that belonged to John Whynniard, Keeper of the King's Wardrobe. Fawkes was installed as a caretaker and began using the pseudonym John Johnson, servant to Percy. The contemporaneous account of the prosecution (taken from Thomas Wintour's confession) claimed that the conspirators attempted to dig a tunnel from beneath Whynniard's house to Parliament, although this story may have been a government fabrication; no evidence for the existence of a tunnel was presented by the prosecution, and no trace of one has ever been found; Fawkes himself did not admit the existence of such a scheme until his fifth interrogation, but even then he could not locate the tunnel. If the story is true, however, by December 1604 the conspirators were busy tunnelling from their rented house to the House of Lords. They ceased their efforts when, during tunnelling, they heard a noise from above. Fawkes was sent out to investigate, and returned with the news that the tenant's widow was clearing out a nearby undercroft, directly beneath the House of Lords.

The plotters purchased the lease to the room, which also belonged to John Whynniard. Unused and filthy, it was considered an ideal hiding place for the gunpowder the plotters planned to store. According to Fawkes, twenty barrels of gunpowder were brought in at first, followed by sixteen more on 20 July. On 28 July, however, the ever-present threat of the plague delayed the opening of Parliament until Tuesday, 5 November.

=== Overseas ===
In an attempt to gain foreign support, in May 1605 Fawkes travelled overseas and informed Hugh Owen of the plotters' plan. At some point during this trip his name made its way into the files of Robert Cecil, 1st Earl of Salisbury, who employed a network of spies across Europe. One of these spies, Captain William Turner, may have been responsible. Although the information he provided to Salisbury usually amounted to no more than a vague pattern of invasion reports, and included nothing which regarded the Gunpowder Plot, on 21 April he told how Fawkes was to be brought by Tesimond to England. Fawkes was a well-known Flemish mercenary, and would be introduced to "Mr Catesby" and "honourable friends of the nobility and others who would have arms and horses in readiness". Turner's report did not, however, mention Fawkes's pseudonym in England, John Johnson, and did not reach Cecil until late in November, well after the plot had been discovered.

It is uncertain when Fawkes returned to England, but he was back in London by late August 1605, when he and Wintour discovered that the gunpowder stored in the undercroft had decayed. More gunpowder was brought into the room, along with firewood to conceal it. Fawkes's final role in the plot was settled during a series of meetings in October. He was to light the fuse and then escape across the Thames. Simultaneously, a revolt in the Midlands would help to ensure the capture of Princess Elizabeth. Acts of regicide were frowned upon, and Fawkes would therefore head to the continent, where he would explain to the Catholic powers his holy duty to kill the king and his retinue.

=== Discovery ===
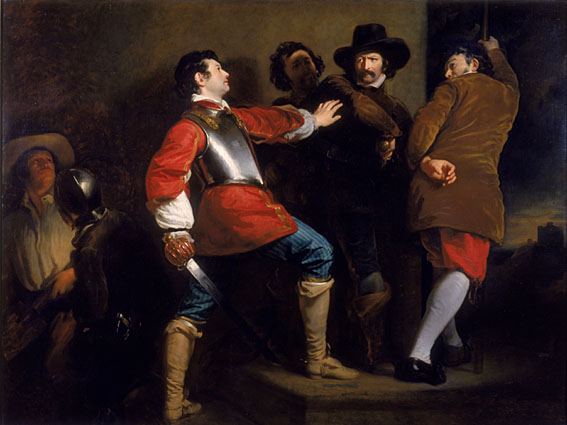
The Discovery of the Gunpowder Plot (c. 1823), by Henry Perronet Briggs

A few of the conspirators were concerned about fellow Catholics who would be present at Parliament during the opening. On the evening of 26 October, Lord Monteagle received an anonymous letter warning him to stay away, and to "retyre youre self into yowre contee whence yow maye expect the event in safti for ... they shall receyve a terrible blowe this parleament". Despite quickly becoming aware of the letter—informed by one of Monteagle's servants—the conspirators resolved to continue with their plans, as it appeared that it "was clearly thought to be a hoax". Fawkes checked the undercroft on 30 October, and reported that nothing had been disturbed. Monteagle's suspicions had been aroused, however, and the letter was shown to King James. The king ordered Sir Thomas Knyvet to conduct a search of the cellars underneath Parliament, which he did in the early hours of 5 November. Fawkes had taken up his station late on the previous night, armed with a slow match and a watch given to him by Percy "becaus he should knowe howe the time went away". He was found leaving the cellar, shortly after midnight, and arrested. Inside, the barrels of gunpowder were discovered hidden under piles of firewood and coal.

=== Torture ===
Fawkes gave his name as John Johnson and was first interrogated by members of the king's Privy chamber, where he remained defiant. When asked by one of the lords what he was doing in possession of so much gunpowder, Fawkes answered that his intention was "to blow you Scotch beggars back to your native mountains." He identified himself as a 36-year-old Catholic from Netherdale in Yorkshire, and gave his father's name as Thomas and his mother's as Edith Jackson. Wounds on his body noted by his questioners he explained as the effects of pleurisy. Fawkes admitted his intention to blow up the House of Lords, and expressed regret at his failure to do so. His steadfast manner impressed King James, who described Fawkes as possessing "a Roman resolution".

James's respect did not, however, prevent him from ordering on 6 November that "John Johnson" be tortured, to reveal the names of his co-conspirators. He directed that the torture be light at first, referring to the use of manacles, but more severe if necessary, authorising the use of the rack: "the gentler Tortures are to be first used unto him et sic per gradus ad ima tenditur [and so by degrees proceeding to the worst]". Fawkes was transferred to the Tower of London. The king composed a list of questions to be put to "Johnson", such as "as to what he is, For I can never yet hear of any man that knows him", "When and where he learned to speak French?", and "If he was a Papist, who brought him up in it?" The room in which Fawkes was interrogated subsequently became known as the Guy Fawkes Room.

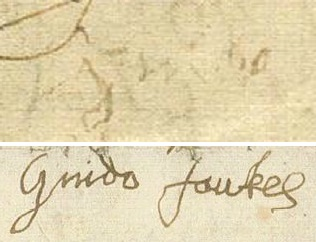
Fawkes's signature of "Guido", made soon after his torture, is a barely evident scrawl compared to a later instance eight days after the torture.

Sir William Waad, Lieutenant of the Tower, supervised the torture and obtained Fawkes's confession. He searched his prisoner, and found a letter addressed to Guy Fawkes. To Waad's surprise, "Johnson" remained silent, revealing nothing about the plot or its authors. On the night of 6 November he spoke with Waad, who reported to Salisbury "He [Johnson] told us that since he undertook this action he did every day pray to God he might perform that which might be for the advancement of the Catholic Faith and saving his own soul". According to Waad, Fawkes managed to rest through the night, despite his being warned that he would be interrogated until "I had gotton the inwards secret of his thoughts and all his complices". His composure was broken at some point during the following day.

The observer Sir Edward Hoby remarked "Since Johnson's being in the Tower, he beginneth to speak English". Fawkes revealed his true identity on 7 November, and told his interrogators that there were five people involved in the plot to kill the king. He began to reveal their names on 8 November, and told how they intended to place Princess Elizabeth on the throne. His third confession, on 9 November, implicated Francis Tresham. Following the Ridolfi plot of 1571, prisoners were made to dictate their confessions, before copying and signing them, if they still could. Although it is uncertain if he was tortured on the rack, Fawkes's scrawled signature suggests the suffering he endured at the hands of his interrogators.

== Trial and execution ==
The trial of eight of the plotters began on Monday 27 January 1606. Fawkes shared the barge from the Tower to Westminster Hall with seven of his co-conspirators. (Note: The eighth, Thomas Bates, was considered inferior by virtue of his status, and was held instead at Gatehouse Prison.) They were kept in the Star Chamber before being taken to Westminster Hall, where they were displayed on a purpose-built scaffold. The king and his close family, watching in secret, were among the spectators as the Lords Commissioners read out the list of charges. Fawkes was identified as Guido Fawkes, "otherwise called Guido Johnson". He pleaded not guilty, despite his apparent acceptance of guilt from the moment he was captured.

The jury found all the defendants guilty, and the Lord Chief Justice Sir John Popham pronounced them guilty of high treason. The Attorney General Sir Edward Coke told the court that each of the condemned would be drawn backwards to his death, by a horse, his head near the ground. They were to be "put to death halfway between heaven and earth as unworthy of both". Their genitals would be cut off and burnt before their eyes, and their bowels and hearts removed. They would then be decapitated, and the dismembered parts of their bodies displayed so that they might become "prey for the fowls of the air". Fawkes's and Tresham's testimony regarding the Spanish treason was read aloud, as well as confessions related specifically to the Gunpowder Plot. The last piece of evidence offered was a conversation between Fawkes and Wintour, who had been kept in adjacent cells. The two men apparently thought they had been speaking in private, but their conversation was intercepted by a government spy. When the prisoners were allowed to speak, Fawkes explained his not guilty plea as ignorance of certain aspects of the indictment.

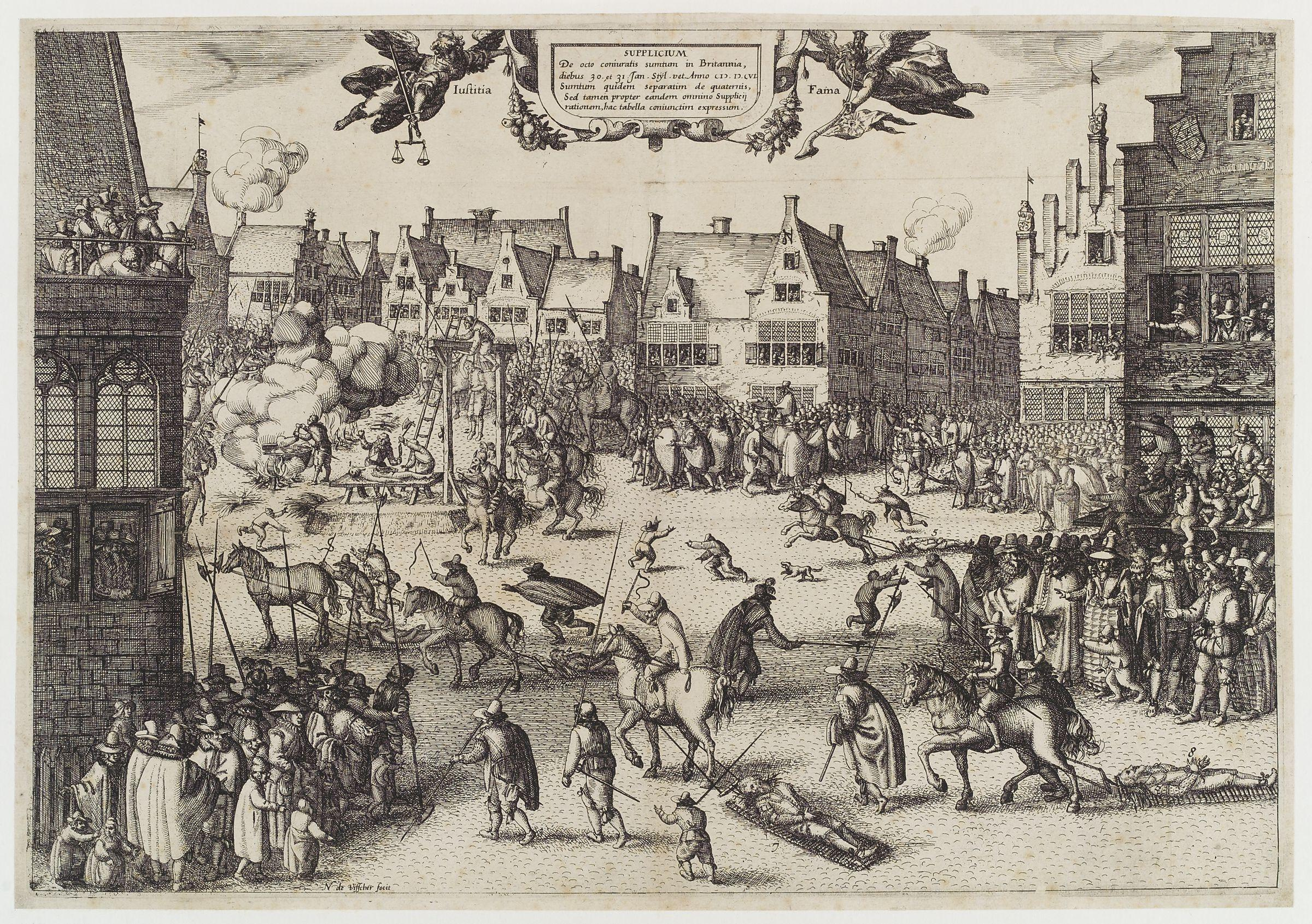
1606 etching of Fawke's execution by Claes Jansz. Visscher

On 31 January 1606, Fawkes and three others—Thomas Wintour, Ambrose Rookwood and Robert Keyes—were dragged from the Tower on wattled hurdles to the Old Palace Yard at Westminster, opposite the building they had attempted to destroy. His fellow plotters were then hanged and quartered. Fawkes was the last to stand on the scaffold. He asked for forgiveness of the king and state, while keeping up his "crosses and idle ceremonies" (Catholic practices). Weakened by torture and aided by the hangman, Fawkes began to climb the ladder to the noose, but either through jumping to his death or climbing too high so the rope was incorrectly set, he managed to avoid the agony of the latter part of his execution by breaking his neck. His lifeless body was nevertheless quartered and, as was the custom, his body parts were then distributed to "the four corners of the kingdom", to be displayed as a warning to other would-be traitors.

== Legacy ==
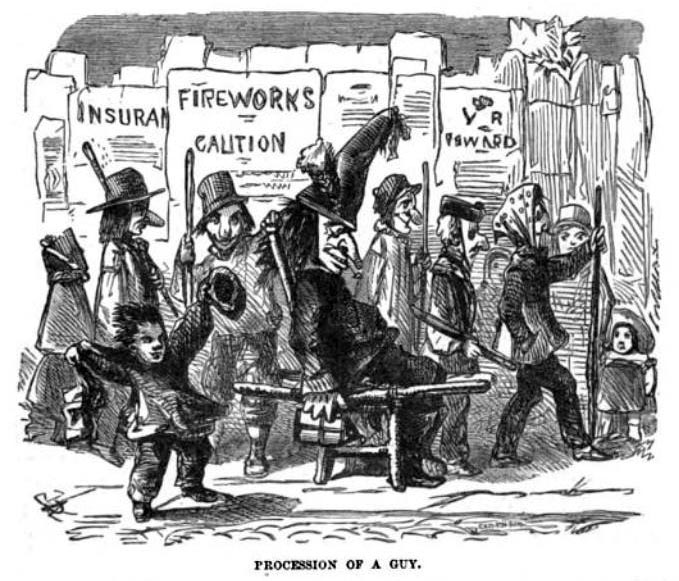
Procession of a Guy (1864)

On 5 November 1605, Londoners were encouraged to celebrate the king's escape from assassination by lighting bonfires, provided that "this testemonye of joy be carefull done without any danger or disorder". An act of Parliament, the Observance of 5th November Act 1605 (3 Jas. 1. c. 1), designated each 5 November as a day of thanksgiving for "the joyful day of deliverance", and remained in force until 1859. Fawkes was one of 13 conspirators, but he is the individual most associated with the plot.

In Britain, 5 November has variously been called Guy Fawkes Night, Guy Fawkes Day, Plot Night, and Bonfire Night (which can be traced directly back to the original celebration of 5 November 1605). Bonfires were accompanied by fireworks from the 1650s onwards, and it became the custom after 1673 to burn an effigy (usually of the pope) when heir presumptive James, Duke of York, converted to Catholicism. Effigies of other notable figures have found their way onto the bonfires, such as Paul Kruger, Margaret Thatcher, Liz Truss, Rishi Sunak and Vladimir Putin. The "guy" is normally created by children from old clothes, newspapers, and a mask. During the 19th century, "guy" came to mean an oddly dressed person, while in many places it has lost any pejorative connotation and instead refers to any male person and the plural form can refer to people of any gender (as in "you guys").

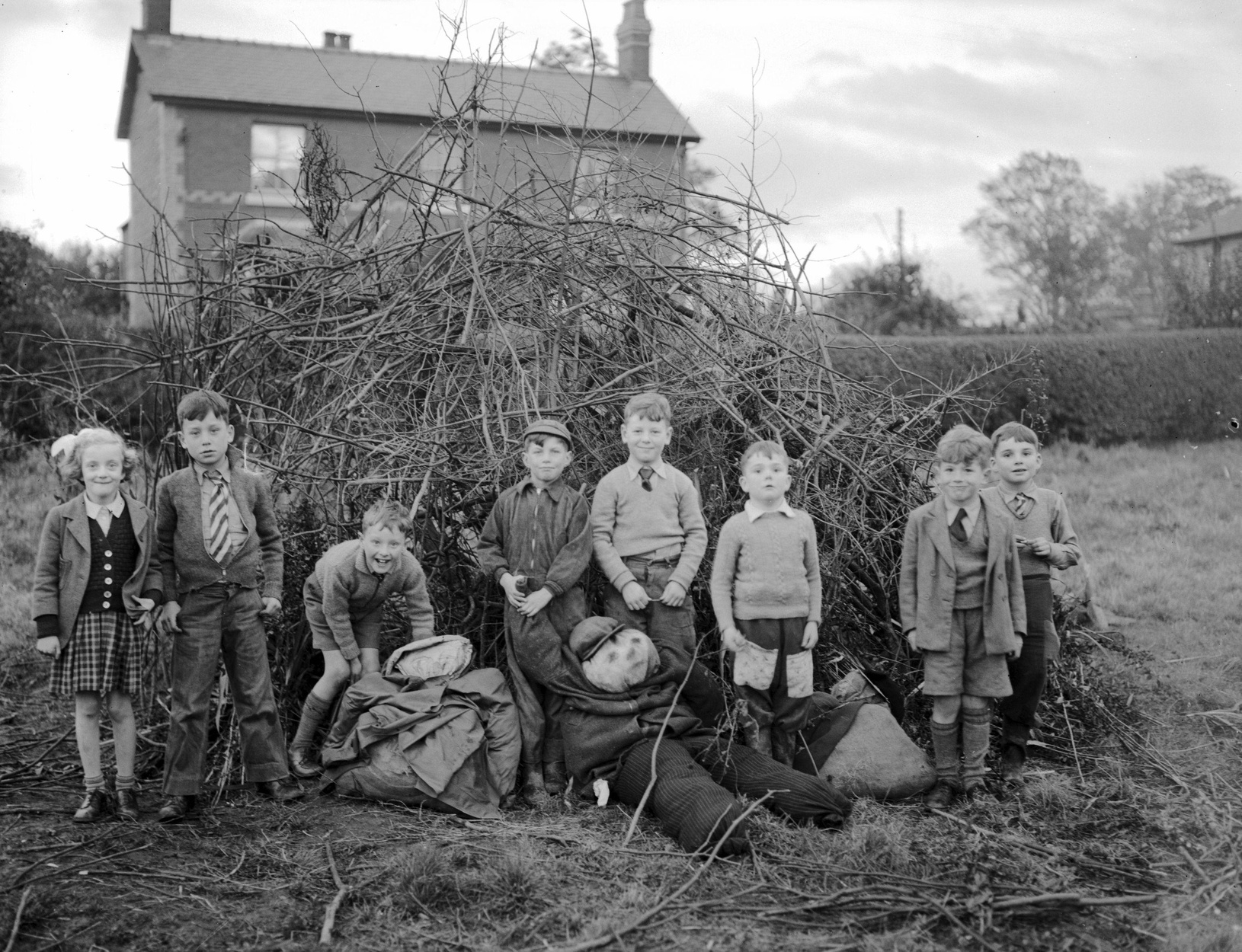
Children preparing for Guy Fawkes night celebrations (1954)

James Sharpe, professor of history at the University of York, has described how Guy Fawkes came to be toasted as "the last man to enter Parliament with honest intentions". William Harrison Ainsworth's 1841 historical romance Guy Fawkes; or, The Gunpowder Treason portrays Fawkes in a generally sympathetic light and his novel transformed Fawkes in the public perception into an "acceptable fictional character". Fawkes subsequently appeared as "essentially an action hero" in children's books and penny dreadfuls such as The Boyhood Days of Guy Fawkes; or, The Conspirators of Old London, published around 1905. According to the historian Lewis Call, Fawkes is now "a major icon in modern political culture", whose face became "a potentially powerful instrument for the articulation of postmodern anarchism" in the late 20th century. Fawkes is regarded by some as a martyr, political rebel or freedom-fighter, especially amongst a minority of Catholics in the United Kingdom.
