= Robert and Thomas Wintour =

Members of the Gunpowder Plot

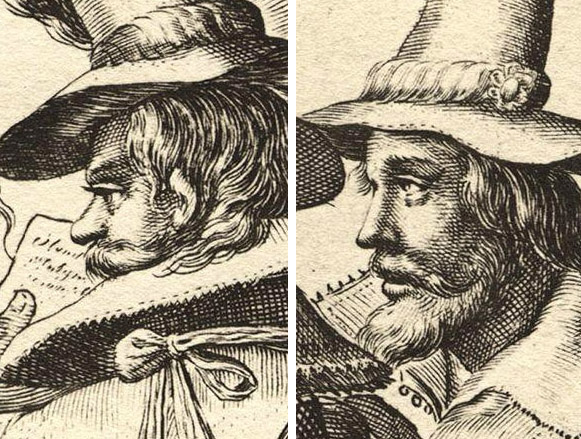
- Contemporary engravings of brothers Robert (left) and Thomas Wintour, from larger image by Crispijn van de Passe
- Born: 1568 (RW); 1571–72 (TW); Yorkshire, England
- Died: 30 January 1606 (aged 37–38) (RW); 31 January 1606 (aged 33–35) (TW); St Paul's (RW); Westminster (TW), England
- Cause of death: Hanged, drawn and quartered
- Spouse: Gertrude Talbot (RW)
- Parent(s): George Wintour, Jane Ingleby
- Motive: Gunpowder Plot, a conspiracy to assassinate King James I and VI and members of the Houses of Parliament

Details
- Role: Non-specific
- Enlisted: Early 1604 (TW); Early 1605 (RW)

Robert Wintour (1568 – 30 January 1606) and Thomas Wintour (1571 or 1572 – 31 January 1606), also spelt Winter, were members of the Gunpowder Plot, a failed conspiracy to assassinate King James I. They were brothers, and related to other conspirators, such as their cousin, Robert Catesby; a half-brother, John Wintour, also joined them following the plot's failure. Thomas was an intelligent and educated man, fluent in several languages and trained as a lawyer, but chose instead to become a soldier, fighting for England in the Low Countries, France, and possibly in Central Europe. By 1600, however, he changed his mind and became a fervent Catholic. On several occasions he travelled to the continent and entreated Spain on behalf of England's oppressed Catholics, and suggested that with Spanish support a Catholic rebellion was likely.

As momentum was building behind a peace settlement between the two countries, Thomas's pleas were ignored. Instead, in 1604 he decided to join with Catesby, who planned to restore England to Catholicism by killing the king and inciting a popular revolt in the Midlands, during which James's daughter, Princess Elizabeth, would be installed as titular queen. Thomas returned to the continent and again failed to elicit Spanish support, but instead met Guy Fawkes, with whom he returned to England. Robert, a devout Catholic who inherited Huddington Court near Worcester, joined the conspiracy the following year.

The plot began to unravel following the delivery of an anonymous letter to William Parker, 4th Baron Monteagle, warning him to stay away from Parliament. Thomas and Catesby confronted Monteagle's brother-in-law, the recently recruited Francis Tresham, threatening to kill him, but Tresham managed to convince them of his innocence. At that stage Thomas reportedly asked Catesby to abandon the scheme, to no avail. When Fawkes was captured at about midnight on 4 November 1605, Thomas fled to Robert's house at Huddington in Worcestershire. Catesby and most of the others spent two days travelling across the Midlands attempting to incite a rebellion, but with an ever-diminishing group of supporters they eventually settled at Holbeche House in Staffordshire, and waited for government forces to arrive. Thomas, by then reintegrated into the group, chose to remain with them, and in the ensuing firefight was shot in the shoulder, and captured. Robert, who had left before the battle, evaded capture until January 1606.

Much of what is written about the plot is based on Thomas's confessions, given in the Tower of London in November 1605. The brothers were tried on 27 January 1606, and hanged, drawn and quartered several days later in London.

== Family and life before 1604 ==
Robert (b. 1568) and Thomas Wintour (b. 1571–72) were sons of George Wintour of Huddington Court in Worcestershire, and his wife Jane (née Ingleby), daughter of Sir William Ingleby of Ripley Castle near Knaresborough. A sister, Dorothy, married another conspirator, John Grant. (Note: Author Alan Haynes mentions another sister, Anne Winter, married to John Ashfield. No other source used in this article makes this claim.) Two agnate half-siblings, John and Elizabeth, resulted from their father's marriage to Elizabeth Bourn, following Jane's death. Their paternal grandparents were Robert Wintour of Cavewell in Gloucestershire, and his wife Catherine, daughter of Sir George Throckmorton of Coughton in Warwickshire. As scions of the Throckmortons, they could therefore claim a kinship with plotters like Robert Catesby and Francis Tresham. Their maternal uncle Francis Ingleby, a Catholic priest, was hanged, drawn and quartered at York in 1586, a fact which, in the opinion of historian and author Antonia Fraser, "could hardly have failed to leave a stark impression upon the Wintour family". The Wintours took their name from the Welsh Gwyn Tour (White Tower). 'Wyntour' was sometimes used in signatures, but not 'Winter' (as the brothers are commonly named).

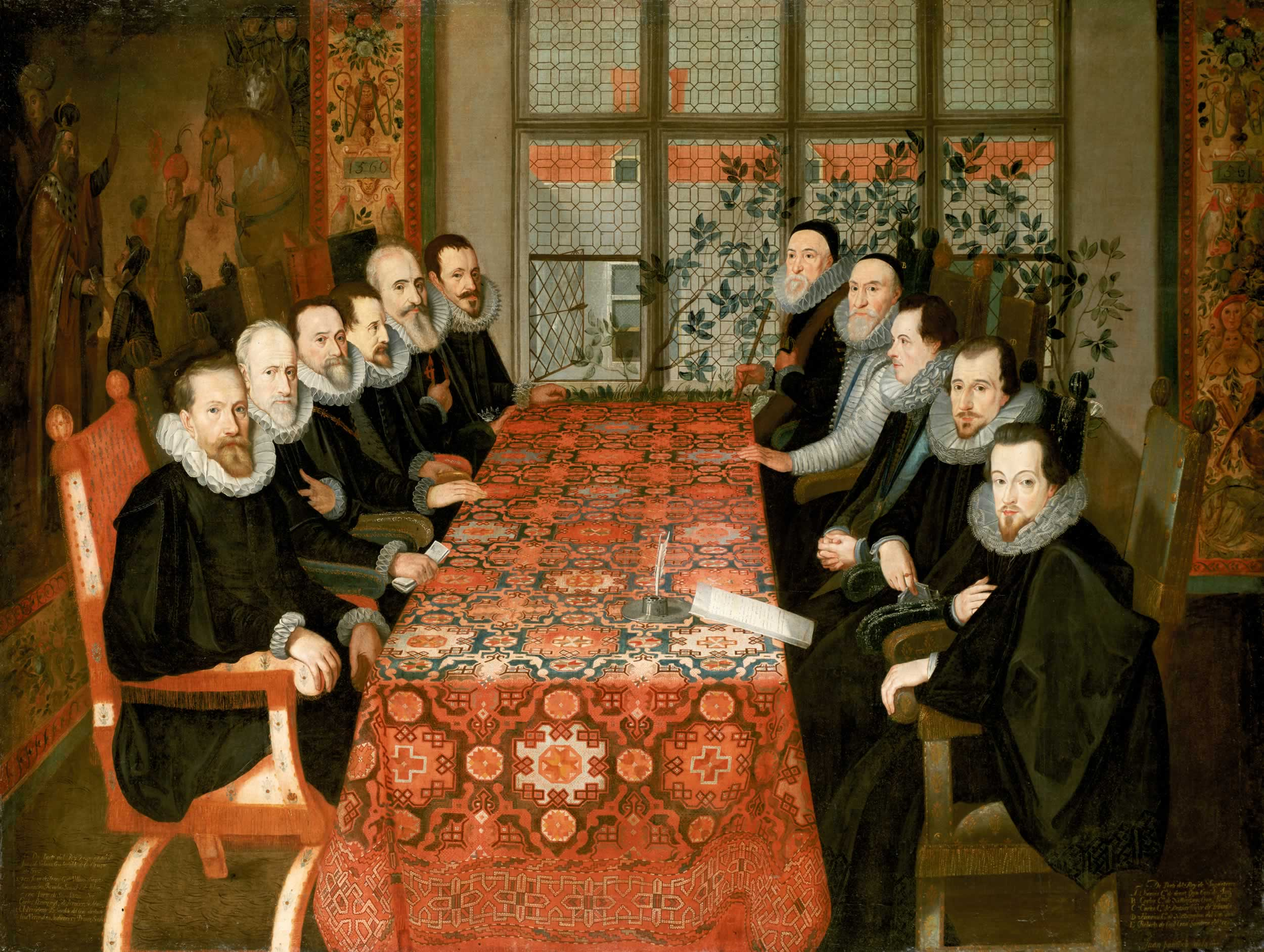
Don Juan de Tassis and Juan Fernández de Velasco, 5th Duke of Frías, pictured seated at the Somerset House Conference in August 1604. Thomas petitioned both on the plight of English Catholics.

Robert, a faithful Catholic, was married to Gertrude Talbot, daughter of the recusant John Talbot of Grafton. He inherited the Tudor Huddington Court near Worcester, along with a significant fortune with which he was known to be generous. Under Robert, Huddington Court became a known refuge for priests. The proclamation for his capture, issued following the plot's failure, described him as "a man of mean stature, and rather low than otherwise; square made, somewhat stooping; near 40 years of age; his hair and beard brown; his beard not much, and his hair short". The Jesuit John Gerard wrote that he was "esteemed in his life to be one of the wisest and most resolute and sufficient gentlemen in Worcestershire". Gerard's appraisal of Thomas was just as complimentary. He was apparently an intelligent, witty and educated man, who could speak Latin, Italian, Spanish and French. "He was of mean stature, but strong and comely and very valiant, about 33 years old or somewhat more." Thomas worked as a servant to William Parker, 4th Baron Monteagle. He was educated as a lawyer, but following several years of dissipation travelled to Flanders and enrolled in the English army. He fought against Catholic Spain in the Low Countries, France, and possibly against the Turks in Central Europe. However, by 1600 his views had changed; citing his belief in the injustice of fighting against the power of Catholic Spain, like his elder brother he became a passionate Catholic. Travelling as 'Mr Winter of Worcestershire', from 24 February 1601 he spent 13 days in Rome for the jubilee, and later that year and into 1602 travelled to Spain, to petition the Council on behalf of the Catholic rebels left leaderless by the execution of Robert Devereux, 2nd Earl of Essex. (Note: Essex was executed for staging a failed coup d'état against Queen Elizabeth I.) Father Henry Garnet, perhaps thinking that the purpose behind Thomas's visit was to gain financial support for impoverished English Catholics, sent him to Superior Father Joseph Creswell, who made the introductions to the Spanish. This trip to Spain later became the first of two visits to be dubbed by the English government as the Spanish Treason, but Thomas's timing was unfortunate, coming as it did so soon after Spain's failed attack in Ireland, and he received only vague assurances of their support. In England he met with the Spanish embassy Don Juan de Tassis, who in August 1603 landed at Dover to help negotiate an Anglo-Spanish treaty. Tassis quickly realised that any chance of a successful Catholic rebellion was unlikely, and discounted Thomas's claim that, with funding, "3,000 Catholics" would be available for the cause. After meeting with King James, he wrote to Spain emphasising the need to prioritise peace with England over the freedom of her Catholics.

== Thomas Wintour’s meeting with Robert Catesby and John Wright ==
I remained with my brother in the country for Allhollantide, in the year of our Lord 1603, the first of the King's reign, about which time, Mr. Catesby sent thither, entreating me to come to London, where he and other friends would be glad to see me. I desired him to excuse me, for I found not myself very well disposed, and (which had happened never to me before) returned the messenger without my company. Shortly I received another letter, in any wise to come. At the second summons I presently came up and found him with Mr. John Wright at Lambeth, where he brake with me how necessary it was not to forsake my country (for he knew I had then a resolution to go over), but to deliver her from the servitude in which she remained, or at least to assist her with our uttermost endeavours.

— Thomas Wintour

According to contemporary accounts late in February 1604 Thomas's cousin, Robert Catesby, invited him to his house in Lambeth, but Thomas was indisposed and could not attend. Catesby sent a second letter that Thomas did respond to, and when he arrived he found his cousin with John Wright, a devout Roman Catholic and a renowned swordsman. Catesby planned to re-establish Roman Catholicism in England by blowing up the House of Lords during the State Opening of Parliament, killing the King. Thomas did not immediately recoil from the idea. As a former soldier he was a practical man, and he agreed with Catesby that should the plot succeed, it would "breed a confusion fit to beget new alterations". He also offered a warning of the price of failure: "the scandal would be so great which the Catholic religion might hereby sustain, as not only our enemies, but our friends also would with good reason condemn us." He nevertheless agreed to join the conspiracy, and as Catesby had not entirely given up hope of foreign support—"because we will leave no peaceable and quiet way untried"—Thomas returned to the continent.

In Flanders he met Juan Fernández de Velasco, 5th Duke of Frías and Constable of Castile, who was holding court there before his journey to England to conclude the Treaty of London. Thomas again stressed the plight of English Catholics, hoping to influence the forthcoming treaty negotiations due to take place at Somerset House in London. The Constable was "friendly rather than forthcoming". Thomas also met the Welsh spy Hugh Owen, and Sir William Stanley, who were both disparaging of Catesby's hopes of Spanish assistance. Owen did, however, introduce Thomas to Guy Fawkes, a committed Roman Catholic who had served under Stanley as a soldier in the Southern Netherlands. Although at that time the plotters had no detailed plans, Thomas told Fawkes of their ambition to "do somewhat in England", should Spanish support be lacking. In late April therefore the two men returned together to Catesby's lodgings at Lambeth, and told him that despite positive noises from the Spanish, "the deeds would nott answere". (Note: Philip III made peace with England in August 1604.)

== Robert joins ==
With the addition to the conspiracy of Thomas Percy (John Wright's brother-in-law), the five plotters met at the Duck and Drake inn, in the fashionable Strand district of London, on 20 May 1604. From hereon Thomas Wintour remained at the heart of the conspiracy. The group leased properties in London, one in Lambeth for storing the gunpowder that was rowed across the Thames to its destination. His confession has the plotters digging a tunnel toward their target during one of the several prorogations of Parliament, (Note: The existence of this tunnel is disputed by Antonia Fraser.) abandoned when the chamber directly beneath the House of Lords became available.

Following the meeting in May Catesby enlisted the aid of several more Catholic men, including Robert Wintour. (Note: Alan Haynes suggests the enlistment was in January 1605.) On the same day he was admitted to the plot, 25 March 1605, the conspirators also purchased the lease to the undercroft they had supposedly tunnelled near. It was into this room that 36 barrels of gunpowder were brought, but when in late August Thomas and Fawkes made an inspection of the gunpowder, they found that it had decayed (separated). Thus, more gunpowder was brought in.

Shortly after this, Catesby recruited the last three conspirators, Sir Ambrose Rookwood, Sir Everard Digby and Francis Tresham. The latter's involvement in the plot has long been the subject of controversy, as on 26 October his brother-in-law William Parker, 4th Baron Monteagle, received an anonymous letter while at home, warning him to stay away from Parliament. Thomas went with Catesby to confront Tresham on the matter, threatening to "hang him" if he did not exonerate himself. Tresham managed to convince the pair that he was innocent, but Thomas then tried unsuccessfully to persuade Catesby to abandon the plot. His pleas were in vain; Catesby's position was echoed by Percy, who at a meeting of the three in London on Sunday 3 November, said that he was ready to "abide the uttermost trial". On the same day, Robert and three others stayed at the home of John Talbot of Grafton, his father-in-law. His friends were Robert Acton and his two sons, plus servants. The group left the following morning with extra horses supplied by Everard Digby, and travelled to Coventry.

== Failure and capture ==
Monteagle had delivered the letter to the English Secretary of State, Robert Cecil, 1st Earl of Salisbury, and on Saturday 2 November (about a week later) the Privy Council decided to undertake a search of Parliament. The following Monday, during the first search, Thomas Howard, 1st Earl of Suffolk, noticed the huge pile of faggots in the corner of the cellar beneath the House of Lords. The king insisted that another search be made, and about midnight another party, this time led by Thomas Knyvet, 1st Baron Knyvet, discovered Fawkes and arrested him.

News of Fawkes's capture soon spread throughout London, including the Strand, where Christopher Wright, John Wright's brother, overheard the commotion. He immediately went to Thomas, who was staying at the Duck and Drake inn. As Fawkes had given his name as "John Johnson", servant of Percy, it was for the latter that the government's first arrest warrant was issued. Thomas guessed as much, and told Wright to go to Percy and "bid him begone". As the rest of those conspirators still in London fled the city, undaunted, he went over to Westminster to try and discern what he could. In author Alan Haynes's opinion, this demonstrated an impressive degree of trust in Fawkes's ability to confound his interrogators, but when Thomas heard for himself that the treason had been uncovered, he left for Huddington, stopping at his sister's house in Norbrook along the way.

The fugitives reached Catesby's family home of Ashby St Ledgers at about 6:00 pm. Not wanting to implicate his mother, Catesby sent a message to Robert, who had just recently arrived there, asking to meet just outside the town. (Note: Robert had collected Stephen and Humphrey Littleton, and extra horsemen along the way, but had left them at some point to head for Catesby's home.) There he told him that Fawkes had been captured. At Dunchurch they collected Everard Digby and his 'hunting party', which included Robert and Thomas's half-brother, John Wintour. He had been invited to join them on 4 November. The next day the group raided Warwick Castle for supplies, something that Robert strongly objected to as it would create "a great uproar" in the country, and later arrived at Huddington Court, where they met Thomas. Early the next morning Huddington's occupants went to confession and took the Sacrament at Mass—in Fraser's opinion, a sign that none of them thought they had long to live. They collected further arms and munitions from Hewell Grange, but trying to recruit more people to their cause they were met with disdain; while the conspirators considered themselves to stand for "God and country", the men of Hewell Grange replied that they were for "King James as well as God and Country". Late that night, pulling a sodden cart full of weapons and armour behind them, they arrived at Holbeche House, near Kingswinford in Staffordshire. Robert was asked if he would go and see if he could elicit any help from his father-in-law, John Talbot at his mansion at 'Pepperhill' in Boningale, Shropshire. He refused, and Thomas went instead, with Stephen Littleton. Talbot was, however, loyal to James, and sent them away, claiming that their visit was "as much as his life was worth". While returning to Holbeche, they received a message that Catesby, Rookwood, John Grant and another man were dead, and the rest apparently fled. Tired and desperate, the plotters had attempted to dry their soaked gunpowder in front of the fire, only for a stray spark to ignite it. While Littleton chose to leave, begging his companion to follow his example, Thomas continued on to Holbeche, where he found the remaining plotters alive, but injured.

While several including Robert and his half-brother John chose to vanish into the night, Catesby, Percy, the Wright brothers, Grant, Rookwood and Thomas remained. Thomas asked them what they intended to do – "We mean here to die". Thomas replied "I will take such part as you do". Richard Walsh, Sheriff of Worcester, arrived with a vigilante force of about 200 men early on 8 November. Thomas was the first to be hit, in the shoulder, while crossing the courtyard. The Wright brothers were next, followed by Rookwood, still injured from the explosion the night before. Catesby and Percy were dropped by a single lucky shot. The sheriff's men then proceeded to strip the defenders of their valuables, but Thomas was saved by the sheriff's assistant. His fine sword, ordered and paid for four months previously, apparently proved too great a temptation for the Sheriff's men, as it was never seen again. He and the others were taken first to Worcester, and then to the Tower of London. Despite a proclamation of 18 November naming them as wanted men, Robert Wintour and Stephen Litteton managed to evade capture until 9 January 1606. They spent about two months hiding out in barns and houses; at one point they were forced to restrain a drunken poacher who happened upon their hiding place. They were eventually discovered at the house of Humphrey Littleton in Hagley, after a cook, John Finwood, informed on them. Humphrey managed to escape, but was captured at Prestwood, in Staffordshire.

== Thomas's confession ==
Historically, much of what is written about the Gunpowder Plot is derived from Thomas's confession, signed on 23 November 1605; details of the so-called Spanish Treason were added three days later. One of only two confessions printed in the King's Book (a highly partial contemporary account of the affair), Thomas Wintour's was the only account the government had of a plotter who had been involved from the beginning; Guy Fawkes, weakened by days of torture, may have been at the heart of the group, but he was not at its first meetings. However, Antonia Fraser views the document with suspicion, not least because Thomas's signature, 'Thomas Winter', differs from his normal signature, 'Thomas Wintour' (it was the former that was invariably used by the government). The signature, possibly forged by lieutenant of the Tower of London William Waad, was made only weeks after Thomas had been shot in the shoulder during the siege at Holbeche House. Biographer Mark Nicholls views the difference in signatures as a significant and puzzling lapse, if a "master forger" is presumed to be responsible for the document. He views the handwriting on the confession as "convincingly that of Winter [Wintour]", pointing out that it appears to be the work of an author, not an editor, and written as a draft for the King's Book. This is a view that generally, Alan Haynes agrees with: "no one has ever made a solid and sensible suggestion about why a government-employed forger (say Thomas Phelippes) would deliberately make such an error in a crucial state document".

Another of Fraser's concerns is Waad's report to Salisbury on 21 November: "Thomas Winter doth find his hand so strong as after dinner he will settle himself to write that he hath verbally declared to your Lordship adding what he shall remember"—or rather, what he was told to remember. A draft of Thomas's confession, in Coke's handwriting, places extra weight on the involvement of the Jesuits. Thomas's confession also details his account of the mine supposedly dug toward Parliament, not mentioned in Fawkes's first confession.

== Trial and death ==
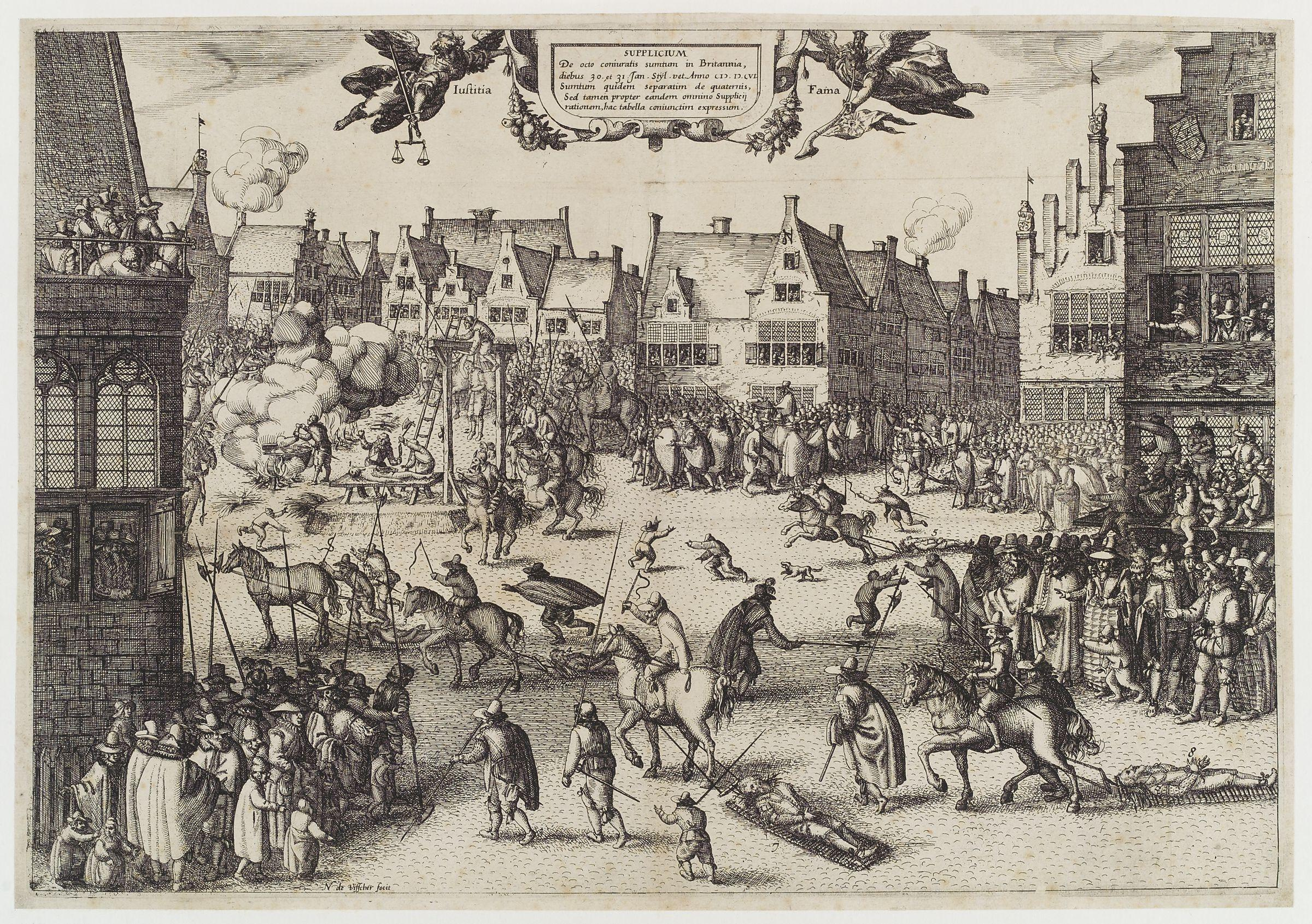
Print of members of the Gunpowder Plot being hanged, drawn, and quartered

The trial of the eight surviving conspirators began on Monday 27 January. The two brothers were brought with the other plotters by barge from the Tower (Catebsy's servant, Thomas Bates, arrived from the Gatehouse Prison), to Whitehall. They were kept in Star Chamber, before being led into Westminster Hall. Charged with high treason, and with no defence counsel, the outcome was never in doubt. The Spanish Treason was a feature of Attorney General Edward Coke's rhetoric, although the Spanish king was "reverently and respectfully spoken of". The Jesuits, such as Henry Garnet, were condemned. Each of the brothers' confessions were also read aloud. While in the Tower, Robert and Fawkes had shared adjacent cells, and were able to speak to each other. However, their private conversation was secretly recorded, and read aloud during the trial.

When asked if he had anything to say, "wherefore judgement of death should not be pronounced", Thomas spoke of his regret at having introduced Robert to the plot, and asked to be hanged on his behalf as well as his own. Robert merely begged for mercy. At the end of the trial, the jury pronounced them all guilty of high treason.

Everard Digby, Robert Wintour, John Grant and Thomas Bates were executed on Thursday 30 January 1606. Dragged by horse to Old St Paul's Cathedral, Robert was the second to be executed, praying quietly to himself before he was hanged, drawn and quartered. The following morning, the remaining four were dragged to the Old Palace Yard at Westminster, opposite the building they had planned to destroy. Thomas was the first to mount the scaffold. It was customary to grant the condemned a speech, but Thomas, "a very pale and dead colour", said it was "no time to discourse: he was come to die". He absolved the Jesuits of any involvement in the plot, asked for Catholics to pray for him, and declared his adherence to the Roman religion. He was hanged for only a few seconds, and then taken to the block for the remainder of his grim sentence. Their half-brother John was executed at Red Hill near Worcester, on 7 April.
