= Gunpowder (TV series) =

2017 British historical drama

- Genre: Period drama Thriller
- Developed by: Kit Harington; Daniel West
- Written by: Ronan Bennett
- Directed by: J Blakeson
- Starring: Kit Harington; Peter Mullan; Mark Gatiss; Liv Tyler
- Music by: Volker Bertelmann
- Country of origin: United Kingdom
- Original language: English
- No. of series: 1
- No. of episodes: 3

Production
- Executive producers: Kit Harington; Ollie Madden; Daniel West; Stephen Wright
- Producer: Laurie Borg
- Cinematography: Philipp Blaubach
- Running time: 60 minutes
- Production company: Kudos

Original release
- Network: BBC One
- Release: 21 October – 4 November 2017

Gunpowder is a British three-part television historical drama produced by Kudos and Kit Harington's Thriker Films for BBC One. The three-part drama premiered on BBC One in the United Kingdom on 21 October 2017 and on HBO in the United States on 18 December 2017.

The series was developed by Ronan Bennett, Kit Harington, and Daniel West and is based on the Gunpowder Plot in London in 1605. It stars Harington, who is a direct descendant of his character Robert Catesby. J Blakeson directed the series.

== Cast ==
=== Main ===
- Kit Harington as Robert Catesby
- Peter Mullan as Henry Garnet
- Mark Gatiss as Robert Cecil, 1st Earl of Salisbury
- Liv Tyler as Anne Vaux

=== Recurring ===
- Luke Broughton as Thomas Bates
- Philip Hill-Pearson as Sir Everard Digby
- Tom Cullen as Guy Fawkes
- Daniel West as Thomas Percy
- Joseph Ringwood as Ambrose Rookwood
- Martin Lindley as Francis Tresham
- Christopher T Johnson as Robert Wintour
- Edward Holcroft as Thomas Wintour
- Matthew Neal as Christopher Wright
- Luke Neal as John Wright
- Shaun Dooley as Sir William Wade
- Derek Riddell as James I
- Robert Emms as Father John Gerard
- Thom Ashley as Father Daniel Smith
- Sian Webber as Lady Dorothy Dibdale
- Pedro Casablanc as The Constable of Castile
- Andy Lucas as Juan de Tassis, 1st Count of Villamediana
- David Bamber as Henry Percy, 9th Earl of Northumberland
- Simon Kunz as Thomas Howard, 1st Earl of Suffolk
- Hugh Alexander as Philip Herbert, 4th Earl of Pembroke
- Sean Rigby as William Parker, 4th Baron Monteagle
- Robert Gwyllim as Sir William Stanley
- Andrew Jarvis as Edward Alford

== Production ==
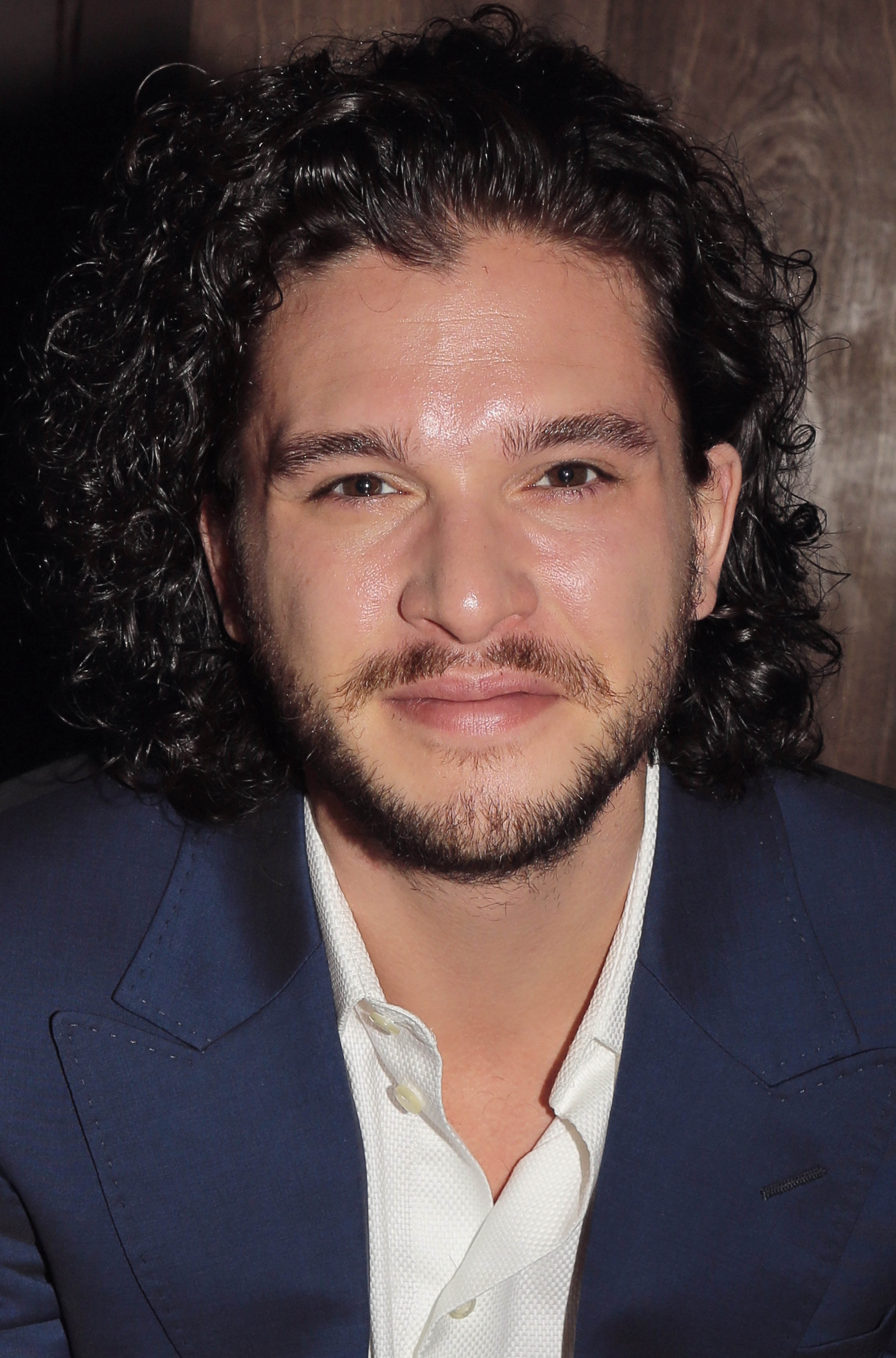
Harington portrays Catesby

In February 2017, the BBC ordered Gunpowder, then announced the three-part drama series was to be developed by Ronan Bennett, Kit Harington, and Daniel West; written by Ronan Bennett; and produced by Kudos. The series stars Kit Harington, Peter Mullan, Mark Gatiss, and Liv Tyler, and is directed by J Blakeson. Filming started in late February 2017.

Filming locations included the National Trust's East Riddlesden Hall and Fountains Abbey, alongside popular visitor attractions such as Oakwell Hall; Ripley Castle; Haddon Hall; Kirkstall Abbey; Bolton Abbey; Lendal Bridge in York City Centre; and Ilkley Moor. Beverley Minster depicted the regal splendour of the Palace of Westminster.

== Episodes ==
All three episodes were available on the BBC iPlayer following the terrestrial broadcast of the first episode.

England, 1603. Elisabeth I is dead. Scottish monarch James Stuart becomes James I of England. His Protestant kingdom has been at war with Catholic Spain for a generation. English Catholics are persecuted. Mass is forbidden. Several attempts have already been made on the new King's life. So far they have all been thwarted.

— Opening caption

No.	Title	Directed by	Written by	Original release date	UK viewers (millions)
1	"Episode 1"	J Blakeson	Ronan Bennett	21 October 2017	9.33
At Baddesley Clinton, Warwickshire, after Jesuit Superior Henry Garnet conducts mass for Robert Catesby, and Anne Vaux, Father Daniel Smith purposely reveals his priest hole to Sir William Wade, acting for Secretary of State Robert Cecil, 1st Earl of Salisbury, to save Garnet and Father John Gerard from discovery. Taking sole responsibility, Lady Dorothy Dibdale is executed for treason with Smith. Catesby vows revenge. In Whitehall, London Henry Percy, 9th Earl of Northumberland advises moderation; King James I must have peace with Spain. At the Tower of London, Cecil tasks Captain William Turner to spy on notorious papist, Sir William Stanley. At Ashby St Ledgers, Northamptonshire, Anne threatens suit against Sir Joseph for unlawfully detaining Catesby and Thomas Wintour, paying fines for their absence from parish Sunday services. Cecil persuades Philip Herbert, 4th Earl of Pembroke that James' life is in grave danger from Catholic conspirators. In Westminster, London, Garnet warns against Catesby's desperate move against James "by tumult." James summons Parliament for stiffer laws to suppress conspirators. Catesby enlists Jack Wright to attack Parliament. In Brussels, Flanders, the safe haven of the exiled English Catholics, George Farwell introduces Turner to Guy Fawkes, who kills Turner for espionage.
2	"Episode 2"	J Blakeson	Ronan Bennett	28 October 2017	7.49
In El Escorial, Spain, Catesby petitions Juan Fernández de Velasco, Duke of Frias, the Constable of Castile, for arms and horses to help kill James. Cecil interrogates Anne and young Robert about Catesby. While burning two heretics alive, Fernández denies Catesby help, preferring "a king who would negotiate" after twenty years of war. To raise an army, Catesby and Wintour meet Sir Stanley and Fawkes, an expert fortification engineer. Master Alford deciphers messages for Cecil. Fernández protests James new laws suppressing Catholic faithful, threatening to sever diplomatic ties. Discredited by Fernández, James chastises Cecil, who trades secretly with Fernández. Thomas Percy, Fawkes and Sir Everard Digby join Catesby's group to obliterate the Commons and Lords, march on Coombe Abbey, and enthrone James' daughter Princess Elizabeth, with Henry Percy, 9th Earl of Northumberland as Lord Protector. Catesby reconciles with his son, young Robert. Wade injures Catesby, who escapes, but Father Gerard is captured and tortured for Catesby's location. Catesby confesses, forcing Garnet to hear plans to kill James, his son, and wife the Queen. Garnet refuses absolution for Catesby's unrepentant pride. Anne warns Robert, Cecil will claim his lands and son when he "stumbles." Catesby infiltrates to rescue Gerard.
3	"Episode 3"	J Blakeson	Ronan Bennett	4 November 2017	5.25
5 November 1605 : Below Parliament, Catesby's men place 6,000 pounds of gunpowder. Fernández, worried about England's future church, questions Garnet, who is bound by the confessional. Juan de Tassis y Acuña, 1st Count of Villamediana, predicts Cecil will arrest thousands of Catholics. Catesby bids cousin Anne, "protect my son." De Tassis learns Catesby's plan from Gerard; Fernández informs Cecil. Wade hears Baron Monteagle's warning "advertisement" of "a terrible blow" to Parliament. Cecil informs James, who sends investigators. Susan Whinniard vouches for Master Percy's undercroft lease, but Wade breaks through. Fawkes lights the fuse; outnumbered, he is overcome, the fuse cut. Thomas Percy watches Fawkes being arrested. Faith restored in Cecil, James chooses his wife Anne of Denmark over Philip. Stanley's army never arrives. Catesby determines not to run. Urged to flee, Garnet surrenders, saving Anne. At Holbeche House, Catesby's group makes a last stand with damp gunpowder. Wade's forces attack, knocking a candle into drying powder, causing a fire. Catesby evacuates, and is killed. Tom is taken alive. Fawkes confesses. The Court of Wards grants Cecil young Robert, who is missing. Garnet is executed with the conspirators. King James signs a treaty with Spain. Anne Vaux and young Robert escape.

== Broadcast ==
Gunpowder premiered on BBC One in the United Kingdom on 21 October 2017. The series premiered in the United States on HBO on 18 December 2017.

== Reception ==
On the review aggregator Rotten Tomatoes, the series has an approval rating of 72% based on 25 reviews, with an average rating of 7.25/10. On Metacritic, which assigns a normalised rating, the series has a score 63 out of 100, based on 10 critics, indicating "generally favourable reviews".

The initial reaction to the first episode was mired with complaints from viewers about the depicted scenes of torture, nudity, and disembowelment despite the broadcast time being 10 minutes after the watershed of 9 pm. In response to complaints, the BBC said: "The scenes aired after 9.30pm with a clear warning given to viewers before the episode started. The methods depicted are grounded in historical fact and reflect what took place during the time of the Gunpowder Plot." It was described as 'a very good drama' by other viewers.

== See also ==
- Gunpowder, Treason & Plot
