= List of people convicted of high treason in England before 1 May 1707 =

Sir Thomas Wyatt the Younger Wyatt’s Rebellion

This is a list of people convicted of high treason in the Kingdom of England before the Union with Scotland on 1 May 1707. It does not include people convicted of petty treason.

== Chronological list ==
1283

- Dafydd ap Gruffydd, Prince of Wales

1305

- William Wallace

1381

- John Ball

1405

- Richard le Scrope, Archbishop of York

1478

- George Plantagenet, 1st Duke of Clarence, for plotting against King Edward IV of England in 1478

1495

- Sir William Stanley

1499

- Edward Plantagenet, 17th Earl of Warwick
- Perkin Warbeck

1521

- Edward Stafford, 3rd Duke of Buckingham

1535

- Thomas More, Lord Chancellor

1536 - Anne Boleyn, Kildare Rebellion, etc.

- Anne Boleyn, Queen
- George Boleyn, 2nd Viscount Rochford
- Sir William Brereton
- Sir Henry Norris
- Archdeacon Charles Reynolds
- Mark Smeaton
- Silken Thomas
- Sir Francis Weston

1537 - Pilgrimage of Grace

- Sir Robert Aske

1541 - Catherine Howard, etc.

- Catherine Howard, Queen
- Thomas Culpeper
- Francis Dereham

1549 - Kett's Rebellion Persons convicted for their involvement in Kett's Rebellion:

- Robert Kett

1553 Jane Grey, etc.

- John Dudley, 1st Duke of Northumberland
- Lady Jane Grey

1554 - Wyatt's Rebellion

- William Thomas
- Henry Grey, 1st Duke of Suffolk

1572 - Ridolfi plot See Ridolfi plot:

- Thomas Howard, 4th Duke of Norfolk

1586 - Babington plot Fourteen individuals were executed for their involvement in the Babington Plot. Persons convicted include:

- Sir Anthony Babington
- Mary, Queen of Scots
- Chidiock Tichborne

1601 - Essex Rebellion

- Robert Devereux, 2nd Earl of Essex
- Henry Wriothesley, 3rd Earl of Southampton

1603 - Main plot

Persons convicted for their involvement in the Main Plot include:

- Henry Brooke, 11th Baron Cobham
- Thomas Grey, 15th Baron Grey de Wilton
- Sir Walter Raleigh, executed 1618

1605 - Gunpowder plot

- Robert Catesby, John Wright, Thomas Wintour, Thomas Percy, Guy Fawkes, Robert Keyes, Thomas Bates, Robert Wintour, Christopher Wright, John Grant, Ambrose Rookwood, Sir Everard Digby and Francis Tresham, for the Gunpowder Plot

1649

- Charles I, King of England, Scotland and Ireland

Regicides of Charles I

See List of regicides of Charles I

Tonge plot

1680 - Popish Plot

Persons implicated in the alleged Popish Plot:

- William Howard, 1st Viscount Stafford

1683 - Rye House Plot

Those convicted in relation to the Rye House Plot include:

- William Russell, Lord Russell
- Elizabeth Gaunt

== Alphabetical list ==
A

B

- Anthony Babington (1586) (Babington Plot)
- Anne Boleyn, Queen (1536)
- George Boleyn, Viscount Rochford (1536)
- Sir William Brereton (1536)
- Henry Brooke, 11th Baron Cobham (1603) (Main Plot)

C

- Charles I, King of England, Scotland and Ireland (1649)
- Thomas Culpeper (1541)

D

- Francis Dereham (1541)
- Robert Devereux, 2nd Earl of Essex (1601) (Essex Rebellion)
- John Dudley, 1st Duke of Northumberland (1553)

E

F

- Guy Fawkes (1605) (Gunpowder Plot)

G

- Elizabeth Gaunt (1685) (Rye House Plot)
- Henry Grey, 1st Duke of Suffolk (1554) (Wyatt's Rebellion)
- Lady Jane Grey
- Thomas Grey, 15th Baron Grey de Wilton (1603) (Main Plot)
- Dafydd ap Gruffydd, Prince of Wales (1283)

H

- Catherine Howard, Queen (1541)
- Thomas Howard, 4th Duke of Norfolk (1572) (Ridolfi plot)
- William Howard, 1st Viscount Stafford (1680) (Popish Plot)

I

J

K

- Robert Kett (1549) (Kett's Rebellion/Norfolk rebellion)

L

M

- Thomas More, Lord Chancellor (1535)

N

- Sir Henry Norris (1536)

O

P

- Edward Plantagenet, 17th Earl of Warwick (1499)

Q

R

- Sir Walter Raleigh (1603, executed 1618) (Main Plot)
- William Russell, Lord Russell (1683) (Rye House Plot)

S

- Mark Smeaton (1536)
- Edward Stafford, 3rd Duke of Buckingham (1521)
- Sir William Stanley (1495)
- Mary Stuart, Queen of Scots (1586) (Babington Plot)

T

- William Thomas (1554) (Wyatt's rebellion)
- Chidiock Tichborne (1586) (Babington Plot)

W

- William Wallace (1305)
- Perkin Warbeck (1499)
- Sir Francis Weston (1536)
- Thomas Wintour or Winter (1605) (Gunpowder Plot)
- Henry Wriothesley, 3rd Earl of Southampton (1601) (Essex Rebellion)

== See also ==
- List of trials of peers in the House of Lords
