= Ambrose Rookwood =

17th century English conspirator

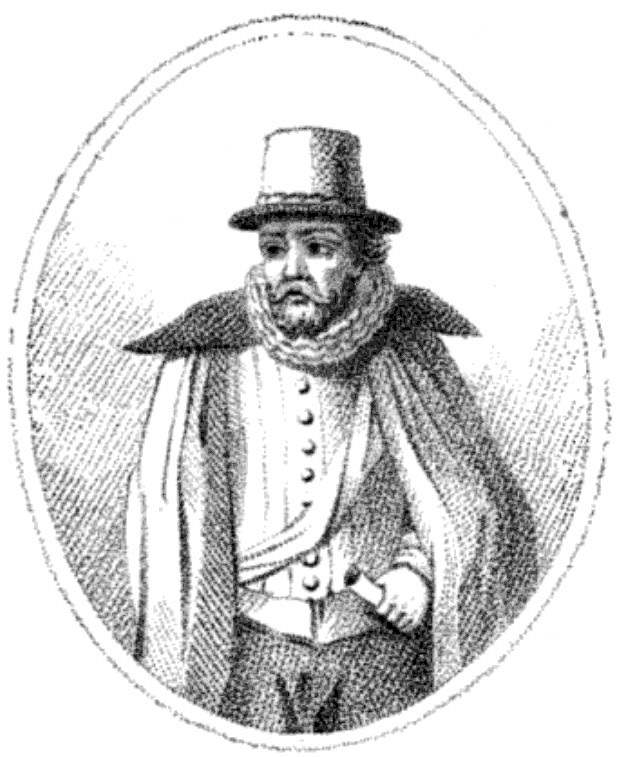
- Early 19th-century portrait of Rookwood
- Born: c. 1578; Suffolk, England
- Died: 31 January 1606 (aged 27–28); Westminster, London, England
- Occupation: Horse-breeder
- Spouse: Elizabeth Tyrwhitt
- Children: 2
- Motive: Gunpowder Plot, a conspiracy to assassinate King James I and members of the Houses of Parliament
- Conviction: High treason
- Penalty: Hanged, drawn and quartered

Details
- Role: Uprising
- Date apprehended: 8 November 1605

Ambrose Rookwood (c. 1578 – 31 January 1606) was a member of the failed 1605 Gunpowder Plot, a conspiracy to replace the Protestant King James I with a Catholic sovereign. Rookwood was born into a wealthy family of Catholic recusants and educated by Jesuits in Flanders. His older brother became a Franciscan and his two younger brothers were ordained as Catholic priests. Rookwood became a horse-breeder. He married the Catholic Elizabeth Tyrwhitt and had at least two sons.

He was enlisted into the plot in September 1605 by Robert Catesby, a religious zealot whose impatience with James' treatment of English Catholics had grown so severe that he conspired to blow up the House of Lords with gunpowder, killing the king and much of the Protestant hierarchy. With the other conspirators he had recruited, Catesby also planned to incite a rebellion in the Midlands, during which James's nine-year-old daughter Princess Elizabeth would be captured and installed as titular queen. Rookwood's stable of fine horses was essential for the uprising to succeed.

The explosion was planned to coincide with the State Opening of Parliament on 5 November 1605, but the man left in charge of the gunpowder stored beneath the House of Lords, Guy Fawkes, was discovered there and arrested. Rookwood fled the city and informed Catesby and the others of the plan's failure. Together the remaining conspirators rode to Holbeche House in Staffordshire, where on 8 November they were attacked by the pursuing Sheriff of Worcester and his men. Catesby was killed, but Rookwood survived and was imprisoned in the Tower of London.

Rookwood and the survivors were arraigned on 27 January 1606 in Westminster Hall. Pleading not guilty, he claimed to have loved Catesby "above any worldly man". He was convicted; his request for mercy was ignored, and he was hanged, drawn and quartered on 31 January, in the Old Palace Yard at Westminster.

== Early life ==
Born sometime about 1578, Ambrose Rookwood was the second of four sons born to Robert Rookwood and his second wife, Dorothy Drury, the daughter of Sir William Drury and Elizabeth Sothill. During his first marriage, to Bridget Kemp, Robert had fathered four sons, but all predeceased him.

The Rookwood family had lived at Stanningfield in Suffolk for 300 years. Wealthy, and staunch Catholics, the authorities viewed them as trouble-makers. Ambrose's Papist cousin Edward had spent ten years in prison for his faith, but in 1578 he entertained Queen Elizabeth I at his home, Euston Hall. It was an expensive visit that made a serious dent in the family's finances and neutered their influence for years thereafter. Ambrose's parents had been imprisoned for their recusancy, and he was indicted on the same charge in February 1605. He was apparently happy to advertise his faith; in the summer of 1605 he commissioned a London cutler, John Craddock, to place a Spanish blade into a sword hilt engraved with the story of the Passion of Christ. As such weapons were generally worn in public, it was "a potentially dangerous statement of faith". (Note: Haynes cites the quote to Piece reference SP 14/16 (link) at the Public Record Office.)

Ambrose and two of his brothers, Robert and Christopher, were educated by Jesuits at Saint-Omer, then in Flanders. (Note: This college later relocated to England and is now known as Stonyhurst.) Both brothers became priests (Ambrose's elder brother, Henry, became a Franciscan), and his half-sisters Dorothea and Susanna became nuns. According to the Jesuit Oswald Tesimond, Rookwood was "well-built and handsome, if somewhat short", which he compensated for by his taste in extravagant clothing. In author Antonia Fraser's opinion, this affectation was somewhat inappropriate at a time when "clothes were supposed to denote rank rather than money".

== Marriage, inheritance, and first treason ==
In or shortly before 1599 he married Elizabeth, daughter of William Tyrwhitt, of Kettleby in Lincolnshire, and his wife Elizabeth, daughter of Sir Peter Frescheville, of Staveley in Derbyshire. The Tyrwhitts were another prominent Roman Catholic family and his wife was possibly a first cousin to his future fellow conspirator Robert Keyes. The couple had two sons, Robert and Henry.

On his father's death in 1600, he inherited Coldham Hall, which subsequently became a refuge for priests. The following year he joined the Earl of Essex's abortive rebellion against the government, for which he was captured and held at Newgate Prison.

== Enlisted ==
In August 1605 Rookwood joined the Jesuits Henry Garnet and John Gerard on a pilgrimage to the shrine of St Winefride's Well in Holywell. Late in September, he was approached by Robert Catesby, Thomas Wintour and John Wright, and invited to join what became known as the Gunpowder Plot. English Catholics had hoped that the persecution of their faith would end when James I came to the throne, as his attitude appeared to be moderate, even tolerant towards Catholics. In Catesby's view, James had reneged on his promises. He therefore planned to kill the king by blowing up the House of Lords with gunpowder, and then incite a popular revolt to install James's daughter, Elizabeth, as titular queen. To this end he had already helped enlist nine Catholics into the conspiracy, but was running out of money and needed to recruit more men. Rookwood was a horse-breeder, and his stable of fine mounts at Coldham Hall was needed for the Midlands uprising. He had been asked to supply them with gunpowder about a year earlier, under the pretence that it was for William Stanley's regiment in Flanders—no longer an illegal operation due to the recent Treaty of London—but otherwise provided no funds for the conspiracy.

Although unverifiable, his wife's relationship to Robert Keyes may mean that Rookwood already suspected that something was being planned. He was at first concerned for the welfare of the Catholic lords who would be present at the explosion, but his compunction was alleviated when Catesby promised him that they would be tricked out of attending Parliament that day. Any lingering doubts Rookwood had were removed by Catesby's lie that the Jesuits had given the scheme their approval. Rookwood had stayed with the Wintours at Huddington Court, and that month with the Catholic Lacons at Kinlet Hall, but at Cateby's behest he rented Clopton House near Stratford upon Avon, and moved there after Michaelmas. He took with him several Catholic religious symbols, such as chalices, crucifixes, vestments, Latin books and praying beads. These were concealed in a cellar built by the Jesuit Nicholas Owen.

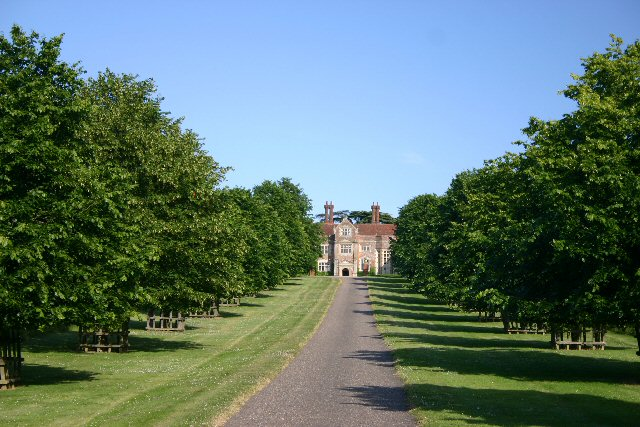
Coldham Hall

Toward the end of October he joined Keyes at his lodgings in London. A few days before the planned explosion he changed his mind about the sword he had ordered John Craddock to make and had the cutler replace the grip with a gold one. The modified sword, which in total probably cost Rookwood more than £20, was delivered on 4 November.

== Discovery ==
The existence of the plot had been revealed in an anonymous letter delivered ten days earlier to William Parker, 4th Baron Monteagle, warning him to keep away from Parliament. On the evening of 4 November the authorities made a search of the House of Lords, where they discovered one of the plotters, Guy Fawkes, guarding a hoard of explosives. He was immediately arrested.

Fawkes had posed as a servant of fellow plotter Thomas Percy, and it was therefore Percy's name that appeared on the first arrest warrant issued by the government. News of Fawkes's capture soon spread through London, prompting Christopher Wright (brother of John) to rush to Thomas Wintour and tell what had happened. Wintour guessed that the government was looking for Percy, telling Wright to travel to Percy's lodgings and "bid him begone". While Wintour lingered, Christopher Wright and Percy left the city, followed by Keyes and then Rookwood. A renowned horseman, Rookwood covered 30 miles in two hours on a single horse. Using various steeds he had left along the route, he passed Keyes at Highgate, and then Wright and Percy at Little Brickhill near Dunstable. He caught up with Catesby, who had left the previous day to prepare the uprising, and told him what had happened in London. The group, which now included Catesby, his servant Thomas Bates, both Wright brothers, Percy and Rookwood, rode on to Dunchurch.

While Fawkes was being tortured, on 6 November the government began to round up anyone they thought might be involved. Rookwood's servants, still in the house their master had so hastily departed, were questioned on the same day. His belongings at Clopton—including several incriminating Catholic symbols—were also taken, and by the time the plotters had reached Catesby's family home at Ashby St Ledgers, Rookwood's name was among the list of suspects drawn up by the Lord Chief Justice. The fugitives continued on to Dunchurch, where they met the recently recruited conspirator Everard Digby, with his hunting party. The next day the group stole horses from Warwick Castle, although with his fine cortège, Rookwood avoided the town. They then collected stored weapons from Norbrook and continued on to Huddington. The party tried in vain to expand their number, but were shunned; no one was prepared to risk being labelled a traitor. Father Garnet, contacted at Coughton Court by Bates, wrote Catesby a letter in which he implored the group to stop their "wicked actions", before himself fleeing.

== Fugitive ==
I doe acknowledge that uppon thursday morninge beeing the 7th of November 1605 my selfe and all the other gentlemen (as I doe remember) did confesse o' sinnes to one Mr. Hamonde Preeste, at Mr. Robert Wintour his house, and amonges other my sinnes I did acknowledge my error in concealing theire intended enterprise of pouder agaynste his Ma and the State, having a scruple in conscience, the facte seeminge to mee to bee too bluddye, hee for all in generall gave me absolution without any other circumnstances beeing hastned by the multitude that were to come to him.

— Declaration of Ambrose Rookwood, 21 January 1606

Rookwood was proclaimed a wanted man on 7 November. He went to confession and with the rest of the group took the sacrament—in Fraser's opinion, a sign that none of them thought they had long to live. Through pouring rain they rode to Hewell Grange, helping themselves to further arms, ammunition and money, and finally reached Holbeche House, on the border of Staffordshire, at about 10:00 pm that night. Tired from three days of riding, they spread in front of the fire some of the now-soaked gunpowder taken from Hewell Grange, to dry out. A stray spark landed on the powder, and Rookwood, Catesby, John Grant and another man were caught up in the resultant conflagration. Rookwood and Catesby were described as "reasonably well", but Grant was blinded.

Several of the conspirators disappeared into the night, but Rookwood, Catesby, the Wright brothers, Percy and Grant stayed on. By 11:00 am the next day the house was surrounded by 200 of the Sheriff of Worcester's men. In the ensuing battle, Wintour was shot in the shoulder. John and Christopher Wright were killed. Catesby and Percy were reportedly both killed by a single musket ball. Rookwood was also shot, but survived and was quickly captured. His belongings should by right have been seized by the government, but his elaborate sword apparently proved to be too great a temptation for the Sheriff's men, and disappeared without trace. Rookwood and the others were taken first to Worcester, and then to the Tower of London. Those conspirators still at large were rounded up shortly after.

== Trial and execution ==
Then did he acknowledge his offence to be so heinous, that he justly deserved the indignation of the King, and of the Lords, and the hatred of the whole Common-wealth, yet could he not despair of Mercy at the hand of a Prince, so abounding in Grace and Mercy : And the rather, because his offence, though it were incapable of any excuse, yet not altogether incapable of some extenuation, in that he had been neither Author nor Actor, but onely perswaded and drawn in by Catesby, whom he loved above any worldly man : and that he had concealed it, not for any malice to the Person of the King, or of the State, or for any ambitious respect of his own, but onely drawn with the tender respect, and the faithful and dear affection he bore to Mr. Catesby his Friend, whom he esteemed more dear than any thing else in the world. And this mercy he desired not for any fear of the image of death, but for grief that so shameful a Death should leave so perpetual a blemish and blot unto all Ages upon his Name and Blood. But howsoever that this was his first Offence, yet he humbly submitted himself to the Mercy of the King, and prayed, that the King would herein imitate God, who sometimes doth punish corporaliter, non-mortaliter; corporally, yet not mortally.

— The gunpowder-treason: with a discourse of the manner of its discovery (1679)

Watched in secret by the king and his family, the surviving conspirators were arraigned in Westminster Hall on 27 January 1606. Some of the prisoners hung their heads "as if their hearts were full of doggedness", while others were nonchalant. All except Digby pleaded "Not Guilty". Defending himself, Rookwood claimed that he had been enlisted into the plot through his friendship with Catesby, "whom he loved above any worldly man". He admitted that he could not expect mercy, but asked for it anyway, so as not to leave a "blemish and blot unto all ages".

His pleas were in vain. The jury convicted him, and he was sentenced to death. Three days later, Digby, Robert Wintour, John Grant and Thomas Bates were hanged, drawn and quartered at the western end of St Paul's churchyard. The following day, Rookwood, Thomas Wintour, Robert Keyes and Guy Fawkes were tied to wattled hurdles and dragged by horse from the Tower, to the Old Palace Yard at Westminster—a longer route than had been suffered by their fellow conspirators. Rookwood had asked to be informed when he passed by his lodgings in the Strand, so that he could open his eyes and see his wife, waiting at the window. He shouted "Pray for me, pray for me!" According to Father Gerard (who was not then present), Elizabeth answered, "I will, and be of good courage. Offer theyself wholly to God. I, for my part, do as freely restore thee to God as He gave thee unto me." For the rest of the journey he kept his eyes closed, in prayer. Thomas Wintour was the first that day to be hanged and then killed. Rookwood was next, and made a short speech to the assembled audience. He was repentant, asking God to bless the king, queen, and their "royal progeny", but "spoil[ed] all the pottage with one filthy weed" by beseeching God to make the king a Catholic. He seems to have been left to hang for longer than the others, before suffering the remainder of his sentence.
