= Everard Digby =

16th- and 17th-century English conspirator in the Gunpowder Plot of 1605

Sir Everard Digby
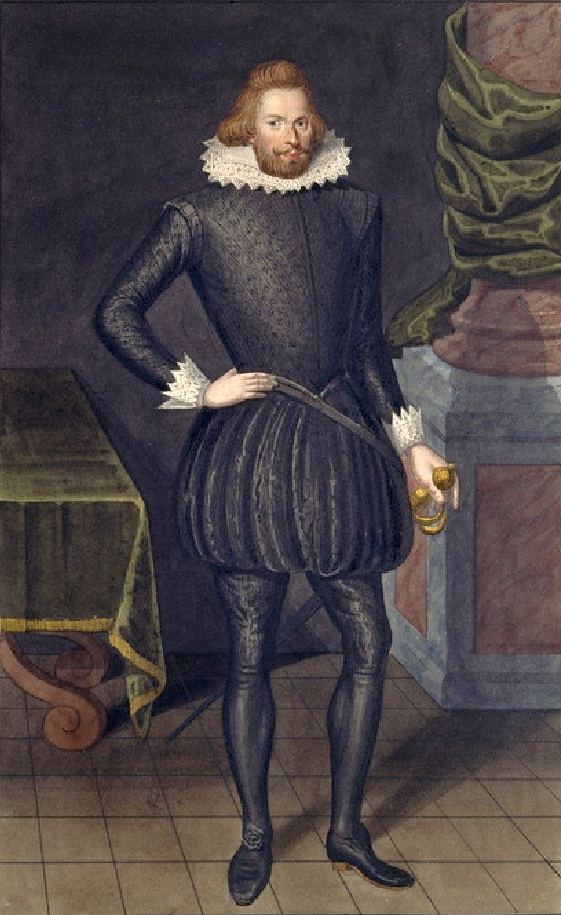
- Portrait of Digby
- Born: c. 1578
- Died: 30 January 1606 (aged 27–28); Castlebaynard Ward, City of London, Middlesex, England
- Spouse: Mary Mulsho
- Children: Kenelm Digby, John Digby
- Parent(s): Sir Everard Digby; Maria Neale
- Motive: Gunpowder Plot, a conspiracy to assassinate King James VI & I and members of the Houses of Parliament
- Conviction: High treason
- Penalty: Hanged, drawn and quartered

Details
- Role: Uprising
- Enlisted: 21 October 1605
- Date apprehended: 8 November 1605

Sir Everard Digby (c. 1578 – 30 January 1606) was a member of the group of provincial English Catholics who planned the failed Gunpowder Plot of 1605. Although he was raised in a Protestant household and married a Protestant, Digby and his wife were converted to Catholicism by the Jesuit priest John Gerard. In the autumn of 1605, he was part of a Catholic pilgrimage to the shrine of St Winefride's Well in Holywell, Wales. About this time, he met Robert Catesby, who planned to blow up the House of Lords with gunpowder, killing James I. Catesby then planned to incite a popular revolt, through which a Catholic monarch would be placed upon the English throne.

The full extent of Digby's knowledge of and involvement in the plot is unknown, but at Catesby's behest, Digby rented Coughton Court and prepared a "hunting party", ready for the planned uprising. The plot failed, however, and Digby joined the conspirators as they took flight through the Midlands, failing to garner support along their way. Digby left the other fugitives at Holbeche House in Staffordshire, and was soon captured and taken to the Tower of London.

Digby was tried on 27 January 1606. Despite an eloquent defence, he was found guilty of high treason, and three days later was hanged, drawn and quartered.

== Origins ==
The Digby family was of Leicestershire origin. Sir John Digby (d. 1269) served on two crusades, and, by 1418, Sir Everard "Greenleaf" Digby was Lord of Tilton and owner of the manor at Drystoke (Stoke Dry), and Rutland's Member of Parliament. Sir Everard lost his life (and his family much of their fortune) fighting in 1461 for Henry VI against Edward IV. The family had a more positive reversal of fortune in 1485 when Sir Everard's sons fought for the victorious Henry VII at the Battle of Bosworth Field.

== Early life ==
Everard Digby was the eldest son of Everard Digby, Esquire (who died in 1592) and his wife Maria (née Neale), daughter of Francis Neale of Keythorpe in Leicestershire. (Note: Maria Neale remarried to the recusant antiquary Sampson Erdeswicke in 1593, by whom she had 3 children in addition to the 14 she had borne to Everard Digby, as is shown by the inscription on Erdeswicke's monument at Sandon, Staffordshire. Erdeswicke died in 1603: his stepson Everard Digby was then living.) The conspirator was a cousin of Anne Vaux, who for years placed herself at considerable risk by sheltering Jesuit priests such as Henry Garnet. He was probably a near kinsman of the 16th-century scholar Everard Digby, but it is clear that the scholar, who died in 1605, was not his father, because as a Fellow of St John's College, Cambridge (a celibate calling) he could not have been married at the time when the young Everard and some of his 13 siblings were born, nor was he "Esquire", as the father is named in his inquisition post mortem of 1592.

In 1596, while still a teenager, he married Mary Mulshaw (or Mushlo), a young heiress who brought with her Gayhurst House in Buckinghamshire. By all accounts their marriage was a happy one, and they had two sons; Kenelm Digby was born in 1603 at Gayhurst, and John in 1605. Unlike other English Catholics, Digby had little first-hand experience of England's recusancy laws. Following the death of his father he had been made a ward of Chancery and was raised in a Protestant household. His wife Mary was converted to Catholicism by the Jesuit priest John Gerard. When Digby fell seriously ill, Gerard used the occasion to convert him also, and the two subsequently became close friends, "calling eachother [sic] 'brother' when we wrote and spoke". Gerard was godfather to Digby's eldest son, Kenelm, and the Digbys also built a hidden chapel and sacristy at Gayhurst.

Digby frequented the court of Elizabeth I, and became informally associated with the Elizabethan gentlemen pensioners. His marriage had significantly expanded his holdings, however, and possibly for this reason he left court to manage his estates. He was apparently an unforgiving landlord, as his tenants in Tilton petitioned the Crown for redress when he failed to honour the expensive leases granted them by his father. He added to his property in Buckinghamshire by buying land in Great Missenden, and a month after the queen's death his social station was elevated when on 24 April 1603 he was knighted by James I at Belvoir Castle. (Note: Digby Thomas gives the date as 23 April instead.) Four days later he was present for Elizabeth's funeral in London.

== Robert Catesby ==
In late August or early September 1605, Digby, his wife Mary, and their secret Jesuit chaplain Edward Oldcorne joined a pilgrimage organised by, amongst others, Henry Garnet and Anne Vaux. (Note: The "others" were Eleanor Brooksby, her nephew William Brooksby, and his wife Dorothy.) The party had set out from White Webbs at Enfield Chase, heading for the shrine of St Winefride's Well at Holywell, and had occasionally stopped along the way to collect more followers. As the thirty or so pilgrims returned from Holywell in mid-September, they stopped at Rushton Hall where Sir Thomas Tresham had recently died, and then continued on to Digby's seat at Gayhurst.

On 21 October Digby, his wife Mary, Garnet and Vaux were at Harrowden celebrating a delayed Feast of St Luke. While there he met Robert Catesby, (Note: Haynes and Fraser do not agree on the dates, or purposes here. Haynes was, however, published about ten years before Fraser, and therefore it is Fraser's chronology that is described from here, although Haynes's description of the meeting is used. Fraser is also apprehensive on the question of just how much Digby knew of Catesby's plot, whereas Haynes is certain that he was made fully aware from the beginning.) who at some point asked him to swear an oath of secrecy before introducing him to what later became known as the Gunpowder Plot. English Catholics had hoped that the years of persecution they suffered during Elizabeth's reign would end when James I came to the throne, as his attitude appeared moderate, even tolerant towards Catholics. In Catesby's view, however, James had reneged on his promises, and he had quickly lost patience with the new Stuart Dynasty. He therefore planned to kill James by blowing up the House of Lords with gunpowder, and then inciting a popular revolt during which a Catholic monarch would be restored to the throne. Catesby had enlisted the aid of other Catholics, but had borne much of the scheme's financial cost and was running out of money. The group had therefore agreed to expand their numbers. To this end Catesby had recruited Ambrose Rookwood—a young and wealthy Catholic with a stable of fine horses—and a wealthy cousin, Francis Tresham.

The extent of Digby's knowledge of the plot is unknown, but in the opinion of author Alan Haynes, Digby was shocked by what he heard, and asked what would become of some of their Catholic friends. Catesby replied "Assure your selfe that such of the nobilitie as are worth the saving shalbe preserved and yet knowe not of the matter." None of their friends would be caught in the explosion. He asked if Catesby had spoken of the matter with Garnet, or any other Jesuits; although Catesby was in no doubt that the Jesuits disapproved of any such action, he lied and said that he would not act without their approbation. Catesby then named the other conspirators, and promised Digby that as soon as they reached Gayhurst he would demonstrate that their religion allowed such acts of regicide, thus dissuading the young lord from confessing to Garnet and discovering the Jesuit's opinion of the matter. Catesby told him to rent Coughton Court from the head of the Throckmorton family, so that he would "the better to be able to do good to the cause [kidnap Princess Elizabeth]". From there, he was to organise a hunting party (in reality a group of armed men on horseback) and be ready for some kind of military manoeuvre. Digby also provided monetary assistance; he promised £1,500 after fellow plotter Thomas Percy failed to pay the rent due for several properties in Westminster.

== Hunting party ==
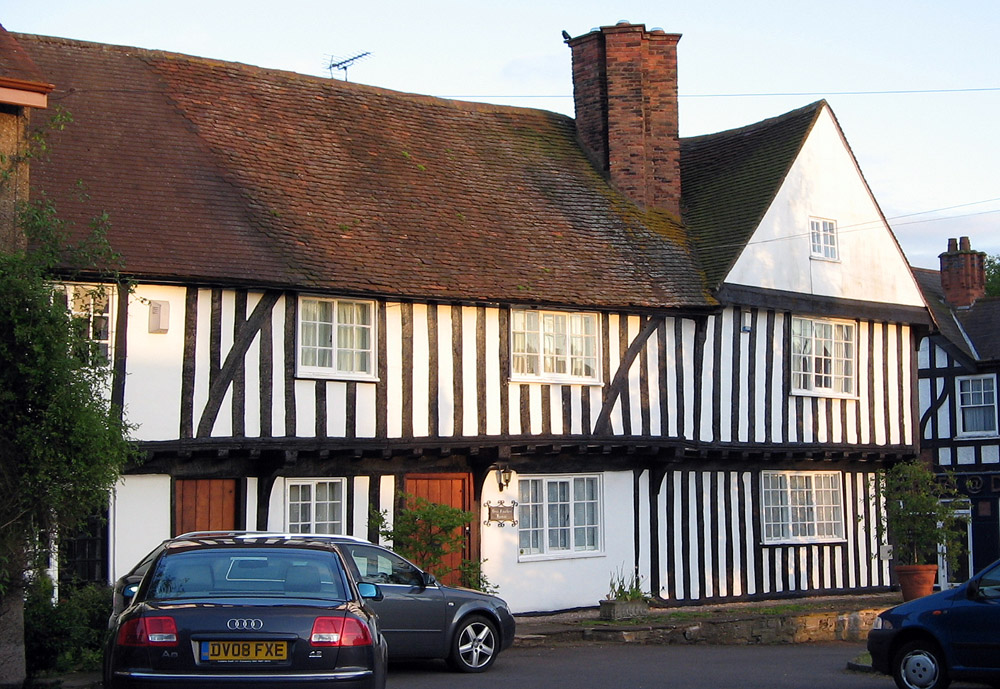
Guy Fawkes House, formerly known as the Red Lion, where Digby was installed on 4 November 1605

On 2 November at Gayhurst, while making preparations for his hunting party, Digby was visited by Gerard. Having noticed that the house was almost completely empty, the Jesuit asked him if there was "any matter in hand" and if Garnet knew of it. Keen not to implicate Gerard, despite being told less than two weeks earlier that the plot had Jesuit approval, Digby told him that there was nothing he knew of "or could tell him of". Although Gerard later used this conversation to defend himself against those who accused him of involvement in the plot, he lived to regret not being given the opportunity to dissuade Digby from his course.

Two days later Digby and his servants were ensconced at the Red Lion inn, in Dunchurch, where his hunt was to take place. He took with him several items of clothing, including "a white satin doublet cut with purple". Also present, but uninvolved, were his uncle, Sir Robert Digby, Humphrey Littleton and his nephew Stephen Littleton. They ate supper, before being joined by fellow conspirator John Grant and a friend. Also invited was the stepbrother of plotters Robert and Thomas Wintour, John Wintour. They attended a mass the next morning, conducted by a Father Hammond, before the party moved on.

Around midnight on 4 November, Guy Fawkes was discovered guarding the gunpowder the plotters had placed beneath the House of Lords, and arrested. Those conspirators still in London soon took flight for the Midlands, finding along the way those who had already left to prepare for the planned uprising. They met Digby and his party at Dunchurch. Catesby told Digby that the king and Salisbury were dead, and "if true Catholics would now stir, he doubted not that they might procure to themselves good conditions". Digby was won over, but many of his party were less than impressed at being so badly deceived, and worse, being associated with treason. One of his servants asked Digby what would happen to them; Digby told him that although he was aware of their ignorance, "but now there is no remedy".

== Flight ==
On 6 November the fugitives raided Warwick Castle and managed to secure more horses, before moving on to Norbrook to collect stored weapons. From there they continued their journey toward Huddington. Catesby ordered his servant (and fellow plotter) Thomas Bates to deliver a letter to Father Garnet at Coughton Court. Catesby and Digby asked Garnet to excuse their recklessness, before asking for his help in raising an army in Wales. Garnet's reply begged them to stop their "wicked actions", and to listen to the Pope's teachings. When the priest tried to comfort Mary Digby, also at Coughton Court, she burst into tears.

With their ever-decreasing band of supporters, the remaining fugitives arrived at Huddington at about 2:00 pm. Any expectation they had of support began to vanish; almost everyone they met showed concern only for their own safety, fearful of being involved with traitors. The next morning they rode through the rain, stopping briefly to help themselves to supplies from the home of the absent Lord Windsor at Hewell Grange. Still the locals refused to have anything to do with them; Digby later admitted that "not one man" joined them. They arrived that night at Holbeche House on the border of Staffordshire, and tired and desperate, spread out some of the now-soaked gunpowder in front of the fire, to dry out. A spark from the fire landed on the powder and the resultant flames engulfed Catesby, Rookwood, Grant, and another man.

== Surrender ==
Catesby and fellow conspirators Thomas Percy, John Wright and his brother Christopher were killed by the Sheriff of Worcester's men early on 8 November, but Digby had already left to give himself up (the only conspirator to do so). With two servants, possibly Bates and his son, he took several horses and hid in nearby woods. Their tracks were soon found, however, and with some hesitation (Digby had intended to surrender himself to someone more worthy), early that morning he presented himself to the most senior-looking of his adversaries. While Digby was taken to the Tower of London, Gayhurst was ransacked; the servants' belongings were stolen, the livestock was sold cheaply, and Mary Digby was left destitute. The sheriff later remarked "All goods are carried away, even to the very floor of the great parlour." At the Tower, Digby's two trunks of clothing were searched, and found to contain £100 in gold, and £50 in white money. William Waad, Lieutenant of the Tower, asked if he could take £50 to pay for Digby's food and bedding.

Yesterday I was before Mr Attorney and my Lord Chief Justice, who asked me if I had taken the Sacrament to keep secret the plot as others did. I said that I had not, because I would avoid the question of at whose hands it were.

— Everard Digby, 10 January 1606

Digby unsuccessfully sought an audience with James to try and explain himself, in Fraser's opinion suggesting either that the extent of his involvement was limited, or that he was "astonishingly naive and trusting of his sovereign's forgiveness." While imprisoned he busied himself with writing secret letters, smuggled from the Tower and not rediscovered until Kenelm Digby's death in 1665. Although he was fortunate not to suffer the fate of Guy Fawkes, who was tortured on several occasions, one of these letters hints that it had been "in a fashion, offered". He described his refusal to cooperate with his interrogators, boasted of his deceit, and how there was nothing he could do to make the plot appear less abhorrent to fellow Catholics. Digby also carved an inscription on the wall of his cell, extant as of 1996.

In December 1605 Mary Digby wrote to the Earl of Salisbury complaining that the Sheriff of Buckinghamshire had allowed people to strip their house for his profit, even her closet, and had not allowed them any of their clothes or linen. She entreated him for the life of her husband and his intercession with King James.

== Trial and execution ==
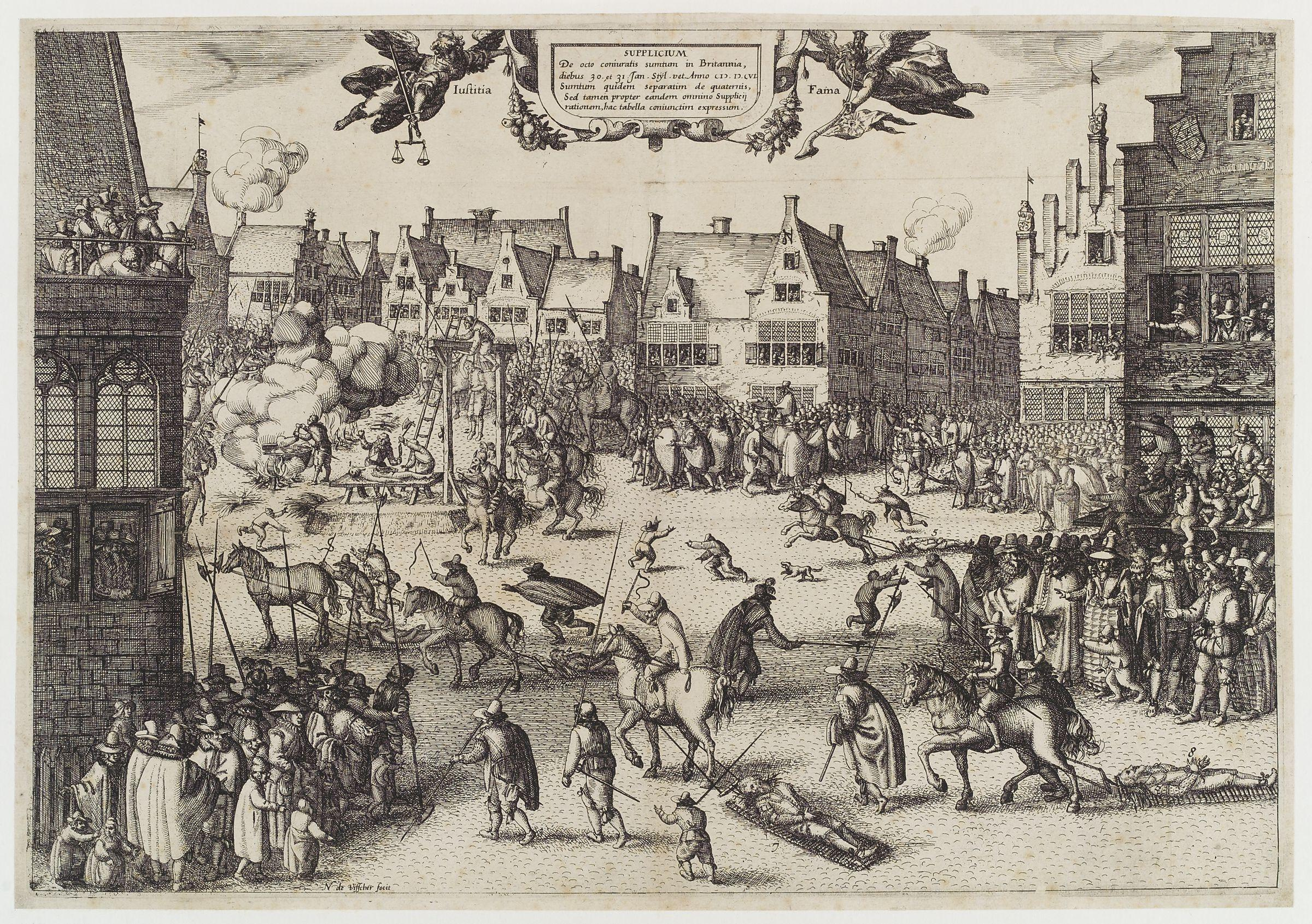
Print of members of the Gunpowder Plot being hanged, drawn and quartered

Digby was tried on the same day as seven of his surviving co-conspirators, in Westminster Hall, on Monday 27 January 1606. As the king and his family watched in secret, the charges against the plotters were read aloud. Alone amongst them Digby pleaded "Guilty", and was tried on a separate indictment. Dressed in a black satin suit and "tuff taffetie gown", he gave a short and moving speech, defending his actions by explaining his affection for Catesby, and the cause of his religion. He accused King James of reneging on his promises of toleration for Catholics, and told of his fears of harsher laws against recusancy. He also pleaded on behalf of his family, that they should not pay for his actions, before making a final request to be beheaded. His words fell on mostly deaf ears. The prosecution poured scorn on James's supposed perfidy, and ridiculed Digby for asking for leniency where he would have given none. Along with the other plotters, he was found guilty. As they were led from the hall, Digby exclaimed: "If I may but hear any of your lordships say, you forgive me, I shall go more cheerfully to the gallows." The reply came back, "God forgive you, and we do."

He spent his last few days in the Tower writing letters to his wife and his sons, urging the two brothers to avoid the examples set by figures such as Cain and Abel. (Note: Kenelm Digby was three years old when his father died, and was removed by his family from the custody of his mother, and made a ward of Archbishop William Laud.) He also wrote poetry:

Who's that which knocks? Oh stay, my Lord, I come:
I know that call, since first it made me know
Myself, which makes me now with joy to run
Lest he be gone that can my duty show.

Jesu, my Lord, I know thee by the Cross
Thou offer'st me, but not unto my loss.

Digby was hanged, drawn and quartered early on Thursday 30 January. Throngs of spectators lined the streets as he was strapped to a wattled hurdle, and alongside Robert Wintour and John Grant was dragged by horse to the western end of Old St Paul's Cathedral churchyard. Thomas Bates was delivered in a similar fashion, but from the Gatehouse Prison. Armed guards interspersed along the route were there to defend against any possible rescue, but did not keep the miscreants' families from witnessing the fate of the four men. Cold and grubby, Digby was the first of the four to face the executioner. He mounted the scaffold and addressed the audience, telling them that he knew he had broken the law, but that morally, and in the eyes of his religion, he had committed no offence. He asked for God's forgiveness, and the country's, and protested the Jesuits' and Father Gerard's innocence. He refused the attentions of a Protestant clergyman, speaking to himself in Latin, before saying goodbye to his friends.

Digby was then stripped of his clothing, except for his shirt. Murmuring "O Jesus, Jesus, save me and keep me", he climbed the ladder and was hanged for a short period. The executioner cut the rope, and Digby fell back to the scaffold, wounding his forehead. Fully conscious, he was taken to the block and castrated, disembowelled, and quartered. Wintour, Grant and Bates followed. The remaining four conspirators suffered similar fates the following day, at the Old Palace Yard in Westminster.
