= Robert Keyes =

English criminal

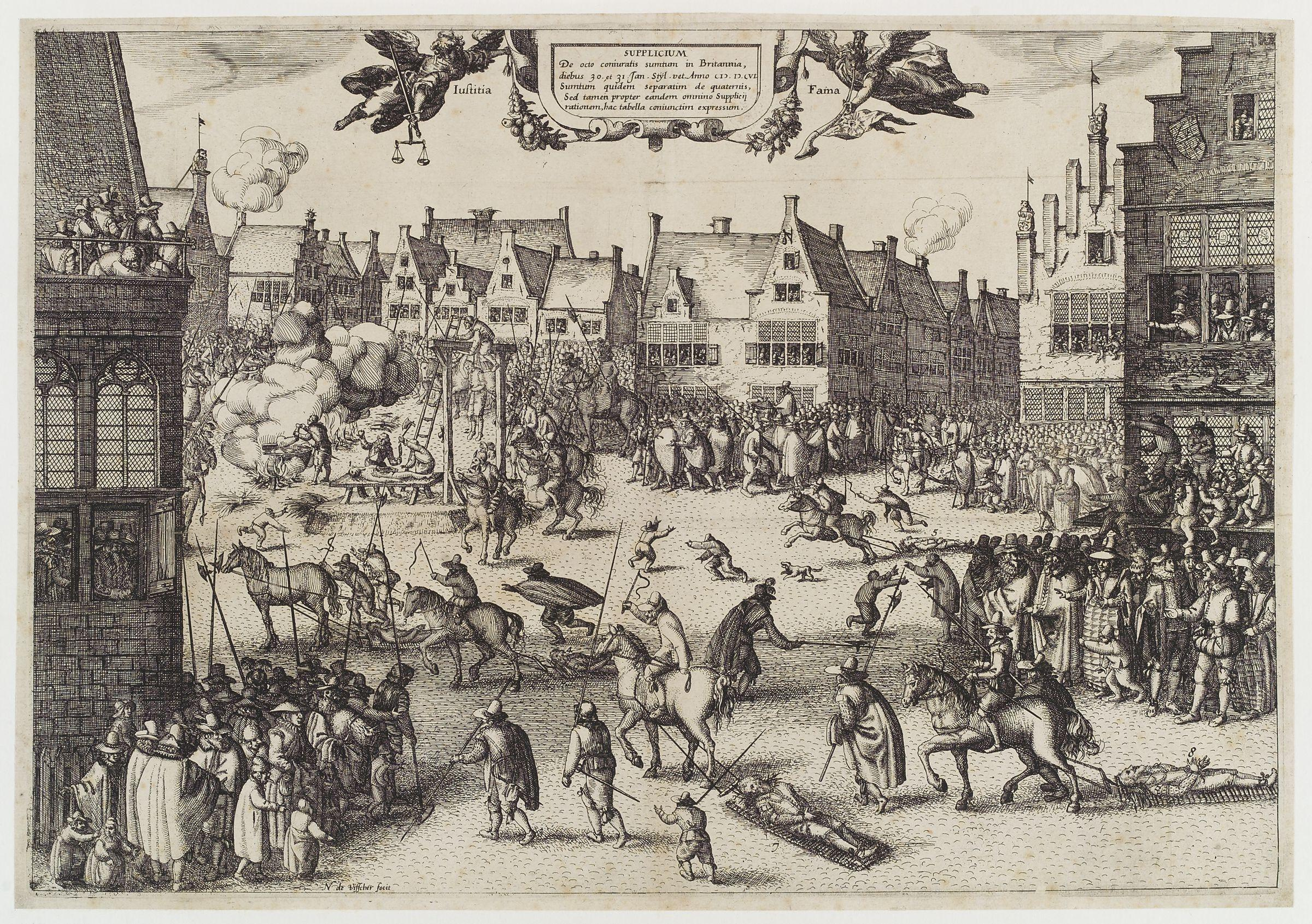
- Print of the execution of the conspirators in January 1606
- Born: c. 1565
- Died: 31 January 1606 (aged 40–41); Westminster, London, Kingdom of England
- Spouse: Christina
- Motive: Gunpowder Plot, a conspiracy to assassinate King James VI and I and members of the Houses of Parliament
- Conviction: High treason
- Penalty: Hanged, drawn and quartered

Details
- Role: Guarding the explosives
- Enlisted: October 1604

Robert Keyes (1565–1606) was a member of the group of provincial English Catholics who planned the failed Gunpowder Plot of 1605, a conspiracy to assassinate King James I by blowing up the House of Lords during the State Opening of Parliament on 5 November 1605. He was the sixth man to join the plot.

Unlike several other conspirators Keyes was not a particularly wealthy man. He was trusted by Robert Catesby, the plot's author, with guarding the explosives stored at the latter's lodgings in London. When the plot was uncovered he fled the city, and was captured several days later in Warwickshire. He was tried with his co-conspirators, found guilty, and in January 1606 hanged, drawn and quartered.

== Life before 1604 ==
Born in about 1565, Robert Keyes was the son of the Church of England Rector of Staveley in North Derbyshire. His mother was a daughter of Sir Robert Tyrwhitt of Kettleby, Lincolnshire, and related to the Catholic Babthorpes of Osgodby. Keyes' first cousin Elizabeth Tyrrwhitt was married to another member of the plot, Ambrose Rookwood. By 1604, Robert had converted to Catholicism. His wife Christina, a widow when he married her, was the governess for the children of Henry Mordaunt, 4th Baron Mordaunt, at Drayton, Northamptonshire and for this Keyes gained the use of horses and other amenities.

== Gunpowder Plot ==
English Catholics had hoped that the persecution of their faith would end when the apparently more tolerant King James I succeeded Queen Elizabeth I, but Robert Catesby, a Catholic zealot from Ashby St Ledgers, remained unimpressed by the new royal dynasty. He therefore planned to kill James by blowing up the House of Lords with gunpowder, following which he would help incite a popular revolt to install James's daughter, Princess Elizabeth, as titular Queen. His role being to guard the gunpowder and other items stored at Catesby's house in Lambeth, Keyes joined the conspiracy in October 1604.

The Jesuit priest John Gerard described Keyes as "a grave and sober man, and of great wit and sufficiency". Father Oswald Tesimond claimed that Keyes had "tasted persecution himself, having lost his goods because of it" while historian and author Cyril Northcote Parkinson's image of him was of a "desperate man, ruined and indebted". Tall, with a red beard, and despite his relative poverty, Catesby declared him "a trusty honest man", and may have paid him for his services. Like fellow plotter Guy Fawkes, he was thought capable of looking after himself. Several conspirators expressed concerns about the safety of fellow Catholics who would be at Parliament on the day of the planned explosion; Keyes was particularly worried about Lord Mordaunt, his wife's employer. Thomas Percy was concerned for his patron and kinsman, the Earl of Northumberland, and the Lords Vaux, Montagu, Monteagle and Stourton were also mentioned. Keyes's suggestion to warn Lord Mordaunt was treated by Catesby with derision, when he answered that "he would not for the chamber full of diamonds acquaint him with the secret, for that he knew he could not keep it."

Keyes and his cousin-in-law Ambrose Rookwood spent the night before the planned explosion at the house of an Elizabeth More, near Temple Bar. They were visited late that evening by Fawkes (in charge of the explosives beneath the House of Lords) who collected a watch left by Percy, for timing the fuse. Several hours later Fawkes was discovered guarding the explosives, and was arrested.

== Failure and death ==
When Keyes heard that Fawkes had been captured he took to his horse and fled for the Midlands. He was overtaken at Highgate by Rookwood, who was rushing to inform Catesby and the others of what had transpired. After he and Rookwood had caught up with Catesby, Percy, Thomas Bates, and John and Christopher Wright, Keyes left the group, and headed instead for Lord Mordaunt's house at Drayton, where he went to ground. He was identified as a suspect on 6 November, and captured several days later.

The conspirators were tried on 27 January 1606 at Westminster Hall. Despite entering pleas of not guilty (only Digby professed his guilt), all eight were found guilty. They were each allowed to speak "wherefore judgement of death should not be pronounced against them". Keyes made no attempt to excuse his actions, claiming that "death was as good now as at any other time", preferable to living "in the midst of so much tyranny". The Jesuit Oswald Tesimond wrote in his Narrative of Keyes's defence:

He claimed that his motive had been to promote the common good. That is, he hoped that his native land would be turned back to the Catholic faith. The violence of the present persecution had driven him also to take part in the conspiracy.

On 31 January 1606 Keyes, Rookwood, Thomas Wintour and Fawkes were taken to the Old Palace Yard in Westminster, to be hanged, drawn and quartered. Rookwood and Wintour were the first to ascend to the gallows. Grim-faced, Keyes went "stoutly" up the ladder, but with the halter around his neck he threw himself off, presumably hoping for a quick death. The halter broke, and he was taken to the block to suffer the remainder of his sentence.
