= Richard Walsh (English politician) =

Sir Richard Walsh was an English politician who served as High Sheriff of Worcestershire and is noted for his role in defeating Robert Catesby's remaining followers at Holbeche House following the failure of the Gunpowder Plot in 1605. He came from Shelsley Walsh.

== Gunpowder Plot ==
After Guy Fawkes was captured in the basement of the Houses of Parliament, many of his fellow plotters, under the leadership of Robert Catesby, fled to the Midlands. Walsh and his 200-strong force of Worcestershire Trained Bands began following the conspirators after they entered Worcestershire and caught up with them at Holbeche House in Staffordshire on 8 November. Among those in Walsh's force was John Streete, the noted marksman from Worcester, who at one point killed two plotters with a single shot.

The conspirators made two major errors: they got their gunpowder wet and then tried to dry it in front of the fire, causing it to blow up. Walsh invited the conspirators to surrender, and upon their refusal ordered an assault of the building. All of the conspirators were either captured or killed. Catesby was killed, as were John and Christopher Wright and Thomas Percy, but Ambrose Rookwood was captured alive and later held in Worcester gaol.
