= Bryn Hall =

Bryn Hall may refer to:

- Bryn Hall, Ashton-in-Makerfield, a house in Bryn Park, Ashton-in-Makerfield, Greater Manchester
- Bryn Hall (rugby union), New Zealand rugby union player
