= Robert Key =

Robert Key may refer to:

- Rob Key (born 1979), English cricketer
- Robert Key (politician) (1945–2023), British politician, Conservative MP for Salisbury 1983–2010

== See also ==
- Robert Kee (1919–2013), British broadcaster, journalist and writer
- Robert Keyes (c. 1565–1606), Catholic conspirator in the Gunpowder Plot
- Bobby Keys (1943–2014), American musician
