= I'Anson baronets =

Extinct baronetcy in the Baronetage of England

Escutcheon of the I'Anson Baronets of Bassetbury

The I'Anson Baronetcy of Bassetbury was a title in the Baronetage of England. It was created on 6 May 1652, at the Louvre in Paris, by Charles II of England for Sir Bryan I'Anson, Knight of Ashby St Ledgers, Northamptonshire, Gentleman of the Bedchamber to Charles I of England for whom he raised a regiment of horse and £10,000. He had been knighted by Henry Cary, 1st Viscount Falkland on 14 December 1624 in Ireland.

The baronetcy became extinct on the death of the 7th Baronet in 1800.

== I'Anson Baronets of Bassetbury (1652) ==
- Sir Bryan I'Anson, 1st Baronet (c. 1590 – c. 1665), Gentleman of the Bedchamber to Charles I
- Sir Henry I'Anson, 2nd Baronet (c. 1617 – c. 1684) LL.D, physician to Charles II of England
- Sir Thomas I'Anson, 3rd Baronet (c. 1648–1707) M.A., born at the Louvre Palace
- Sir Thomas Bankes I'Anson, 4th Baronet (c. 1701–1764), Gentleman Porter of the Tower of London
- Sir Thomas Bankes I'Anson, 5th Baronet (1724–1799), LL.B, born Languedoc, rector of Corfe Castle, Dorset
- Sir John Bankes I'Anson, 6th Baronet (1759–1799), rector of Corfe Castle, Dorse
- Sir John I'Anson, 7th Baronet (1733–1800), of New Bounds, Kent, brother-in-law of Earl James Annesley
