= Thomas Bates =

1605 Gunpowder Plot planner

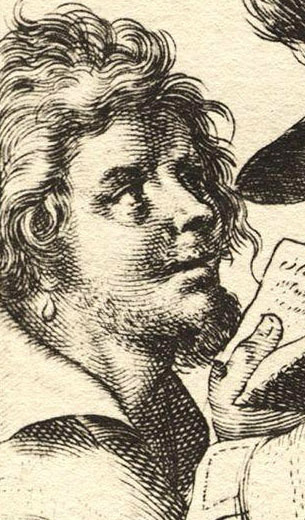
- A contemporary engraving of Bates, by Crispijn van de Passe.
- Born: 1567; Lapworth, Warwickshire, England
- Died: 30 January 1606 (aged 38–39); Westminster, London, England
- Cause of death: Hanged, drawn and quartered
- Occupation: Retainer
- Spouse: Martha Bates
- Motive: Gunpowder Plot, a conspiracy to assassinate King James VI & I and members of the Houses of Parliament
- Conviction: High treason
- Penalty: Hanged, drawn and quartered

Details
- Role: Catesby's retainer

Thomas Bates (1567 – 30 January 1606) was a member of the group of provincial English Catholics who planned the failed Gunpowder Plot of 1605.

Bates was born at Lapworth in Warwickshire, and became a retainer to Robert Catesby, who from 1604 planned to kill King James I by blowing up the House of Lords with gunpowder, and inciting a popular revolt during which a Catholic monarch would be restored to the English throne. Bates was invited to join the conspiracy after he accidentally became aware of it. As he rode with Catesby to prepare for the group's planned uprising on 5 November 1605, Guy Fawkes was found guarding the gunpowder stored under the House of Lords and arrested. Bates subsequently accompanied Catesby and his small group of fugitives to Holbeche House in Staffordshire, but left shortly before his master was killed there by government forces on 8 November. He was subsequently captured and taken to London.

Bates was the only member of the group to implicate the Jesuits in the conspiracy, but may have done so only to alleviate his punishment. He retracted his statement when it became clear he was to be executed. Three days after his trial on 27 January 1606, he was hanged, drawn and quartered.

== Biography ==
=== Servant ===
Bates was born at Lapworth in Warwickshire, and was married to Martha Bates. He was employed as a retainer to Sir Robert Catesby's family, and with his wife lived in a cottage on the Catesby family estate. He was allowed his own servant, as well as his own armour. Bates was considered a loyal and devoted servant to Catesby.

Bates was the seventh man to be enlisted into what became known as the Gunpowder Plot, a scheme devised early in 1604 by Catesby to kill King James I by blowing up the House of Lords with gunpowder, and inciting a popular revolt during which a Catholic monarch would be restored to the English throne. Bates's involvement in the plot began when he became suspicious of Catesby's movements. In December 1604 (Note: According to his confession.) he was invited to his master's lodgings at Puddle Wharf in London, and questioned there by Thomas Wintour and Catesby, who had noted his suspicion. Bates told them that he thought that they "intended some dangerous matter about the Parliament House, because he had been sent to get a lodging near unto that place." At that point the two men let Bates in on the secret.

In the same month it was announced that because of the plague, the re-opening of Parliament would not be in February, but rather in October. During this delay the conspirators may have dug a tunnel beneath Parliament, although no evidence for its existence has ever been found. The plotters ultimately stored their gunpowder in the undercroft directly beneath the House of Lords. In July 1605 the opening of Parliament was again delayed, this time until Tuesday 5 November. Catesby had funded most of the plot, but by August 1605 he was running out of money. During a secret meeting at Bath in August, at which he, Percy and Thomas Wintour were present, the plotters decided that "the company being yet but few" he was to be allowed to "call in whom he thought best". Bates was uncomfortable with the idea, and was the only member of the conspiracy to object. He was over-ruled however, and Catesby soon enlisted Ambrose Rookwood, Francis Tresham and Everard Digby.

=== Failure ===
The last details of the plot were finalised in October. Guy Fawkes would light the fuse and then escape across the Thames, while simultaneously a revolt in the Midlands would help to ensure the capture of Princess Elizabeth. Late on Monday 4 November, Bates set out with Catesby and John Wright for the planned revolt. The following day while at Dunstable re-shoeing Catesby's horse, they were met by Rookwood, who delivered the devastating news that Fawkes had been discovered guarding the gunpowder and arrested. As those conspirators still in London fled the city, the group soon integrated Christopher Wright and Thomas Percy. They rode toward Dunchurch, on horses sent from Everard Digby by prearrangement. They met Robert Wintour (brother to Thomas) at Ashby St Ledgers, and Digby at Dunchurch. On 6 November they stole horses from Warwick Castle, and collected stored weapons from Norbrook, near Stratford-upon-Avon. As they continued toward Huddington, and as the government issued a proclamation for the fugitives' arrest (Catesby's servant was listed as Robert Ashfield, probably a mistake for Bates), Catesby ordered Bates to deliver a letter to Father Henry Garnet at Coughton Court, asking for his support. Bates's news proved momentous for the Jesuits; he overheard Father Oswald Tesimond exclaim "we are all utterly undone". Garnet's reply to Catesby begged them to stop their "wicked actions", and to listen to the pope's teachings.

=== Capture ===
By the time the fugitives and their supporters arrived at Holbeche House on the border of Staffordshire, they were exhausted. Drenched from the rain, they spread out some of the now-soaked gunpowder in front of the fire, to dry out. A spark from the fire landed on the powder and the resultant flames engulfed Catesby, Rookwood, Grant, and another man. At some point between then and the arrival of the Sheriff of Worcester and his men, Bates left the house, possibly with his son and Digby. If he was with the latter, he was captured later the same day and taken to London. Catesby was killed early that day along with Percy, John Wright and his brother Christopher.

=== Imprisonment and execution ===
While imprisoned, on 4 December Bates claimed that Father Oswald Tesimond knew of the plot. In the opinion of author Antonia Fraser however, Bates's evidence is suspect; he was of a lower class than his co-conspirators, and could therefore reasonably have assumed he was at more risk of being tortured than the others. Perhaps trying to curry favour with his interrogators, he was the only conspirator to implicate the Jesuits. He later retracted his confession when it became clear that he was to be executed.

Bates was charged with high treason, and tried at Westminster Hall on Monday 27 January 1606, alongside seven of his fellow conspirators. He arrived at the hall separately from the others; prisons operated on a class-based system and so he was kept at the Gatehouse Prison, rather than the Tower. Only Digby pleaded guilty. On the morning of 30 January 1606 therefore, Bates was tied to a wattled hurdle and dragged by horse along the street, from the Gatehouse Prison to the western end of St Paul's Churchyard. There he was present as first Digby, then Robert Wintour, and then Grant, were hanged, drawn and quartered. Bates was the last to ascend the scaffold that day, and met a similarly gruesome end. The following day the four remaining conspirators were executed in the same manner.
