= Thomas Percy (Gunpowder Plot) =

English Gunpowder Plot conspirator (c.1560–1605)

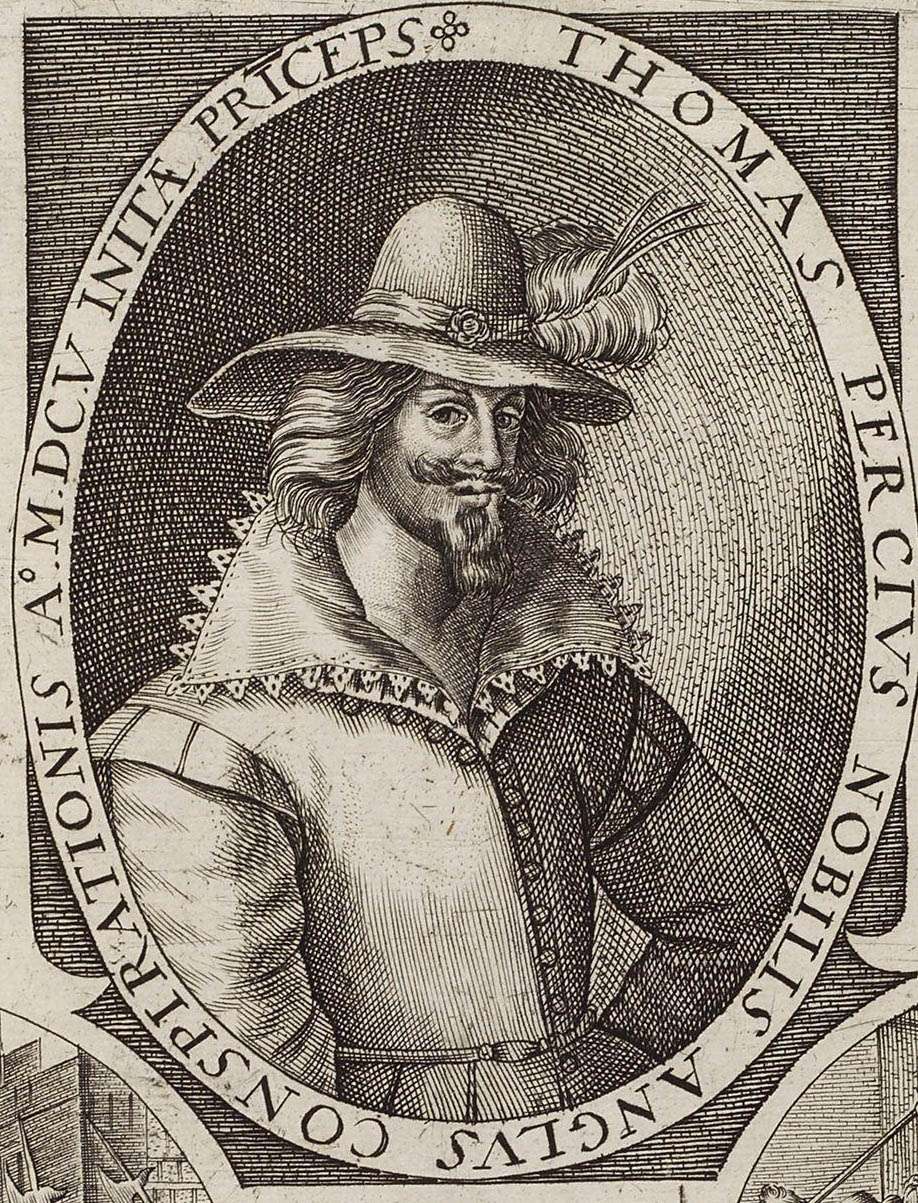
- Engraving of Percy
- Born: c. 1560
- Died: 8 November 1605 (aged 44–45); Holbeche House, Staffordshire, England
- Occupation: Constable of Alnwick Castle
- Spouse: Martha Wright
- Relatives: Allan Percy (cousin)
- Motive: Conspiracy to assassinate King James VI and I and members of the Houses of Parliament

Details
- Role: Logistics
- Enlisted: 20 May 1604

Thomas Percy (c. 1560 – 8 November 1605) was a member of the group of provincial English Catholics who planned the failed Gunpowder Plot of 1605. He was a tall, physically impressive man; little is known of his early life beyond his matriculation in 1579 at the University of Cambridge, and his marriage in 1591 to Martha Wright. In 1596 his second cousin once removed, Henry Percy, 9th Earl of Northumberland, appointed him constable of Alnwick Castle and made him responsible for the Percy family's northern estates. He served the earl in the Low Countries in about 1600–1601, and in the years before 1603 was his intermediary in a series of confidential communications with King James VI of Scotland.

Following James's accession to the English throne in 1603, Percy became disenchanted with the new king, who he supposed had reneged on his promises of toleration for English Catholics. His meeting in June 1603 with Robert Catesby, a religious zealot similarly unimpressed with the new royal Stuart dynasty, led the following year to his joining Catesby's conspiracy to kill the king and his ministers by blowing up the House of Lords with gunpowder. Percy helped fund the group and secured the leases to certain properties in London, one of which was the undercroft directly beneath the House of Lords, in which the gunpowder was finally placed. The conspirators also planned to instigate an uprising in the Midlands and to simultaneously kidnap James's daughter, Elizabeth. Percy was to remain in London and secure the capture of her brother, Henry.

When the plot was exposed early on 5 November 1605, Percy immediately fled to the Midlands, catching up with some of the other conspirators en route to Dunchurch in Warwickshire. Their flight ended on the border of Staffordshire, at Holbeche House, where they were besieged early on 8 November by the pursuing sheriff of Worcester and his men. Percy was reportedly killed by the same musketball as Catesby, and was buried nearby. His body was later exhumed, and his head exhibited outside Parliament. His membership in the plot proved extremely damaging to his patron, the Earl of Northumberland, who although uninvolved was imprisoned in the Tower of London until 1621.

== Life before 1604 ==
Thomas Percy was the younger of two sons born to Edward Percy of Beverley and his wife Elizabeth (née Waterton). His father was a son of Jocelyn/Josceline Percy (died 1532), whose father was Henry Percy, 4th Earl of Northumberland. Thomas was a second cousin once removed of the 4th Earl's descendant, Henry Percy, 9th Earl of Northumberland.

He was born around 1560 and matriculated at the University of Cambridge as a member of Peterhouse in 1579. Little is known of his early life. He may have been a papist before he was at some point received into the Catholic Church, and he may have sailed with George Clifford, 3rd Earl of Cumberland, in 1589. In 1591 he married Martha Wright, daughter of Ursula Wright (a convicted recusant) and sister to Christopher and John Wright (both later involved in the Gunpowder Plot). Claims by several authors that Percy may have left Martha "mean and poor" for an unidentified woman in Warwickshire are disputed, (Note: Author Paul Durst questions the reliability of contemporary reports on this matter, in Intended Treason: what really happened in the Gunpowder Plot, South Brunswick, New York, London: A S Barnes, 1971, ISBN 0-498-07830-2) but the two were at least estranged: in 1605 Martha and her daughter were living on an annuity funded by the Catholic William Parker, 4th Baron Monteagle. Thomas and Martha's son, Robert, married Emma Mead at Wiveliscombe in Somerset on 22 October 1615.

I understand by this bearer, my servant Meyricke of your willing disposition to favour Thomas Percy, a near kinsman to my brother of Northumberland, who is in trouble for some offence imputed unto him. I pray you to continue the same, that thereby his life may not be in hazard. He is a gentleman well descended and of good parts, and very able to do his country good service; you shall do a thing very acceptable to us both and not disagreeable with equity, which we will upon all occasions deserve of you.

— Letter from Robert Devereux, 2nd Earl of Essex, to Mr Justice Beaumont, February 1596

Despite not being a close relative, in 1595 the 9th Earl of Northumberland made Thomas responsible for collecting rents from his northern estates, and the following year appointed him constable of Alnwick Castle. Thomas exercised his authority in a manner which gave some cause for complaint, not least from an officer he replaced, and contemporary reports of his dealings with the earl's tenants include claims of mismanagement and bribery. (Note: One such report claims "...there was a bell carryed out of Warkworth castle and sold by Sir John Ladyman, Mr. Percye's deputie, to a Scottishman for £10, and a token sent by Mr. Percye to one Henrye Finch to carrye the bell to the Scottishman's ship at Almouth." Another says "John Wilkinson of Over Busdon says that Mr. Percy had £30 for his farmhold, being but 18s. of ancient rent, besides £4 he gave to Sir John Ladyman and Gabriel Ogle for procuring the bargain at Mr. Percy's hands.") During a border skirmish he killed James Burne, a Scot, for which he was imprisoned at a London gaol, but his release was secured by the intervention of Robert Devereux, 2nd Earl of Essex. Thomas subsequently aided Essex in a conspiracy against the Scottish warden of the middle marches, although unlike several others who later joined the Gunpowder Plot, he was not a member of the earl's failed rebellion of 1601.

Percy was a tall, physically impressive man, "of serious expression but with an attractive manner". He has been variously described as belligerent and eccentric, with "surges of wild energy subsiding into sloth". The Jesuit priest Father John Gerard wrote that in his youth Percy had "been very wild more than ordinary, and much given to fighting", while the Jesuit Oswald Tesimond thought he had been "rather wild and given to the gay life, a man who relied much on his sword and personal courage." According to both men, Percy's conversion to Catholicism was a calming influence, but biographer Mark Nicholls, who calls Percy "a pugnacious character", says that this was only true to a point. His excesses did not prevent him from joining Northumberland during his command in the Low Countries, held from 1600 to 1601, for which he was rewarded with £200. The earl also appointed Percy his receiver of rents in Cumberland and Northumberland, in 1603. Henry Percy was considered a supporter of the Catholic cause, and on several occasions before 1603, suspecting that Queen Elizabeth I did not have long to live, he entrusted Thomas with the delivery of secret correspondence to and from her probable successor, King James VI of Scotland. Northumberland's uncle had been executed for his involvement in the Rising of the North, a plot to replace Elizabeth with James's mother, Mary, Queen of Scots. He planned to make up for his family's disgrace by building a strong relationship with James, but also wished to counter the influence of Robert Cecil, 1st Earl of Salisbury, whose father Lord Burghley (it was rumoured) James believed had been responsible for Mary's death.

Exactly what assurances James gave Percy are unknown. Tesimond wrote that he made "very generous promises to favour Catholics actively", and "he would admit them to every kind of honour and office", but the consensus among historians is that what promises James did make were oral, rather than written. Fraser posits that the Scottish king probably intended to allow Catholics to worship privately, which if true was a much more reserved view than that subsequently announced by Percy, who told his fellow Catholics that the king had promised to protect their religion. Considering the "quaintness" of James's spoken English there may have been some misunderstanding on both sides. In his surviving correspondence with Northumberland, the king writes only that neither would "quiet" Catholics be disturbed, nor would those that deserved recognition "through their good service" be overlooked. This mixing of signals was to have lasting consequences.

== Plot ==
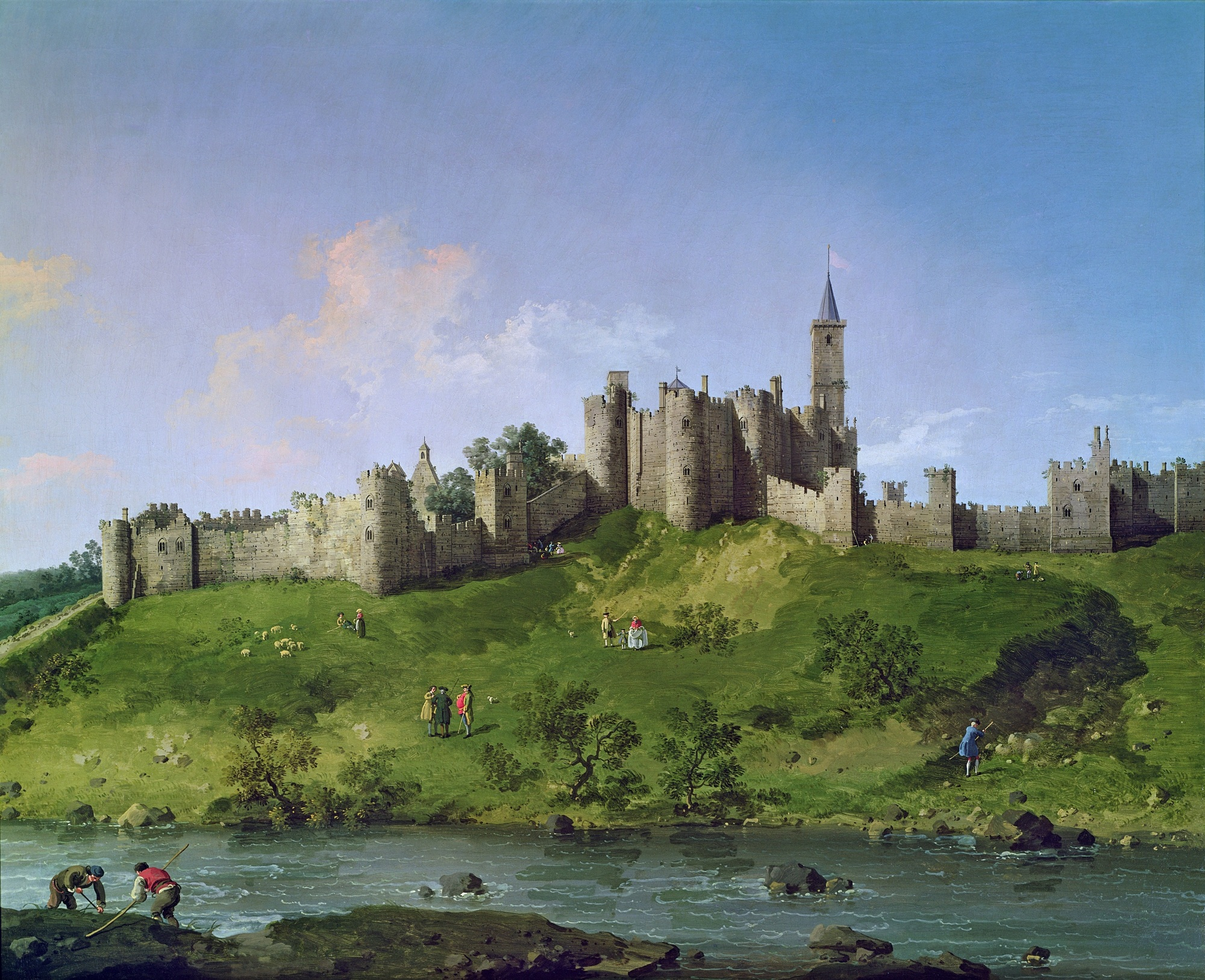
Alnwick Castle by Canaletto, c. 1760

Percy became the fifth member of the Gunpowder Plot on Sunday 20 May 1604. Almost a year earlier, he had called at Robert Catesby's home at Ashby St Ledgers, and complained bitterly about James, who since succeeding Elizabeth had done little to fulfil his expectations. (Note: Percy's brother-in-law was John Wright, a personal friend of Catesby's. Percy's daughter by Martha may have been betrothed that year to Catesby's eight-year-old son, creating a family connection between the two men.) He had threatened to kill the new king with his own hands, but was asked by Catesby to restrain himself, and told "I am thinking of a most sure way and I will soon let thee know what it is." Thus Percy found himself at the Duck and Drake inn near the Strand in London, along with Catesby and his cousin Thomas Wintour, John Wright and Guy Fawkes. His first words at the meeting were "Shall we always, gentlemen, talk and never do anything?" All five later swore an oath of secrecy on a prayer book, and then celebrated Mass in another room with Father Gerard, who was ignorant of their pact.

While the plotters did not then have a detailed plan, Percy's appointment on 9 June as a Gentleman Pensioner gave him a reason to establish a London base. Through Northumberland's agents, Dudley Carleton and John Hippesley, he subleased a house in Westminster from Henry Ferrers, a tenant of John Whynniard, and installed Fawkes there as his servant, "John Johnson". On 25 March 1605 Percy also obtained the lease for the undercroft directly underneath the first-floor House of Lords. It was into this room that the plotters moved 36 barrels of gunpowder from Catesby's lodgings on the opposite side of the River Thames. The plan was that during the State Opening of Parliament, at which the king and his ministers would be present, the plotters would blow up the House of Lords, killing all those within it. James's daughter, Elizabeth, would be captured during a Midlands uprising and installed as a titular queen.

Percy spent that autumn collecting Northumberland's rents, while Catesby continued to enlist support. By October 1605, he had 12 Catholic men assigned to his cause and was at work on the remaining details. (Note: Some of the plotters were invited to meet Catesby by letter, sent sometimes by Percy.) Several conspirators expressed disquiet over the safety of fellow Catholics who might be caught in the planned explosion. Percy's concern was for his patron, Northumberland, who it seems might have been made Lord Protector if the plot had succeeded. Lord Monteagle's name was also mentioned, by a worried Francis Tresham. The fate of Elizabeth's brother, Henry, was uncertain; although the plotters presumed that he would die with his father, they decided that, if he did not attend Parliament, Percy should kidnap him.

== Monteagle letter ==
On Saturday 26 October, at his house in Hoxton, Monteagle received an anonymous letter that warned him to stay away from Parliament. Uncertain of its meaning, he delivered it to Robert Cecil, 1st Earl of Salisbury. Cecil was already aware of certain stirrings, although he did not then know the exact nature of the plot or who exactly was involved. Instead of informing the king immediately, he decided to wait and watch what happened. Catesby's reaction to news of the letter's existence was somewhat different; he and Wintour suspected that Francis Tresham was its author and the two went to confront him. Tresham managed to convince them of his innocence, all the while urging them to abandon the plot. Percy reacted to the news by declaring that he was ready to "abide the uttermost trial". He may have visited King James's infant son Charles on 1 November, indicating perhaps that some rearrangement of the plan was being considered. The deposition of a servant claimed that Percy visited the young prince's lodgings and "made many enquiries as to the way into his chamber", although the statement came too late for Percy to comment on it.

Percy visited Northumberland at Syon House, west of London, on 4 November. Fraser suggests that his visit was a "fishing expedition", to find out what, if anything, Northumberland had heard about the letter. This "expedition" later proved disastrous for the earl, who claimed that there was nothing treasonable about their conversation, and that Percy had merely asked him "whether he would command any service" before leaving. Percy then went to another of Northumberland's properties, Essex House in London, and spoke with his nephew, Josceline. Later that evening he met with Wintour, John Wright and Robert Keyes, and assured them that all was well. He then travelled to his lodgings along Gray's Inn Road, where he left orders for his horses to be made ready for an early departure the next morning.

== Failure and death ==
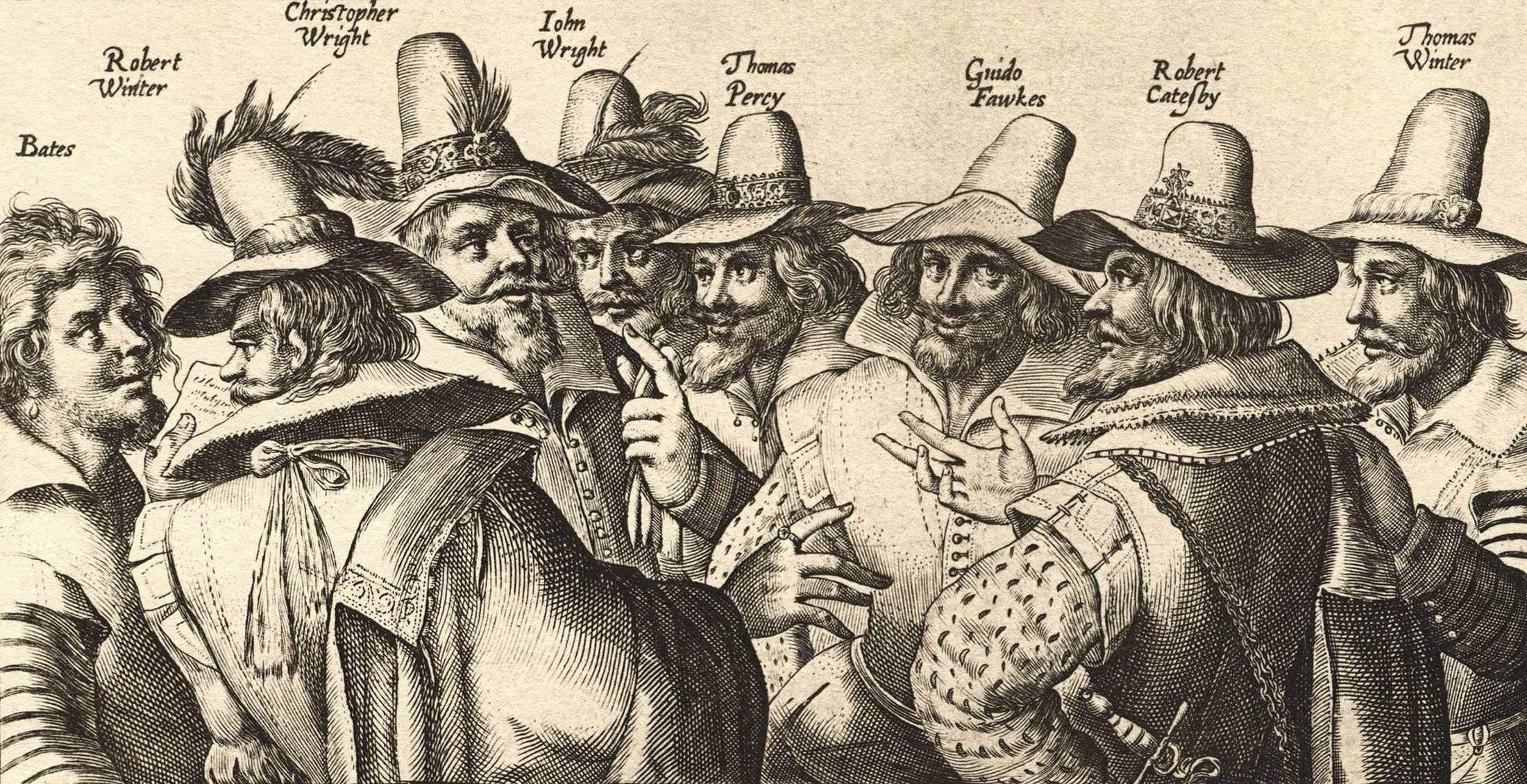
A contemporary engraving of eight of the thirteen conspirators, by Crispijn van de Passe. Percy is fourth from the right.

By early November, the king knew about the Monteagle letter. (Note: The king was shown the letter on Friday 1 November.) James felt that it hinted at "some strategem of fire and powder", perhaps an explosion exceeding in violence the one that had killed his father, Lord Darnley, in 1567. The following day, the Privy Council told him that they had decided to undertake a search of Parliament, "both above and below". The first, headed by Thomas Howard, 1st Earl of Suffolk, was made on 4 November. In the undercroft beneath the House of Lords he noticed a tall man who appeared to be a servant, and a large pile of faggots—far too large to serve the small house Percy had subleased from Henry Ferrers. The house's owner, John Whynniard, told the search party that its tenancy was held by Percy. Monteagle, present during the search, immediately told Suffolk that he suspected Percy was the letter's author. The king ordered a second, more thorough search to be made, and at about midnight, Fawkes was discovered guarding the gunpowder, and was immediately arrested.

As Fawkes identified himself as John Johnson, servant to Thomas Percy, it was Percy's name which appeared on the government's first arrest warrant. It described him as a "tall, florid man, with a broad beard—'the head more white than the beard'—and stooping shoulders, being also 'long footed, small legged'". The celebrated astrologer Simon Forman was employed to divine his whereabouts, a rider was sent to look for him in northern England, and a search was made of Essex House. All of this was in vain, however, as Percy had been warned of Fawkes's capture and had fled for the Midlands with Christopher Wright, telling a servant as he went, "I am undone." The two men met Catesby and the others (who had left for the Midlands uprising) and continued on to Dunchurch, at one point throwing their cloaks off to increase their speed. A relative of Lieutenant of the Tower of London William Waad encountered Percy leaving London, which led to Waad writing the following letter to Salisbury on 5 November:

It may please your good lordship my cousin Sir Edward York, being lately come out of the north and coming this afternoon to me, upon speech of the happy discovery of this most monstrous plot, he telleth me he met Thomas Percy, the party sought for, going down to the north disguised [...] From the Tower in haste.

Accompanied by some of his fellow conspirators, Percy's flight ended at about 10:00 pm on 7 November, at Holbeche House on the Staffordshire county boundary. He was unharmed by a gunpowder accident that injured Catesby and a few of the others, but those who remained resolved to wait for the arrival of government forces, who were only hours behind. Thus at 11:00 am the following morning the house was besieged by the Sheriff of Worcestershire, Richard Walsh, and his company of 200 men. In the ensuing firefight, Thomas Percy and Catesby were reportedly killed by the same musket ball, fired by a John Streete of Worcester. News of the battle soon reached London, rendering superfluous a government proclamation made on the same day and which offered a rich reward for his capture. The survivors were taken into custody and the dead buried near Holbeche, but on the orders of the Earl of Northampton, the bodies of Percy and Catesby were exhumed and their heads displayed on spikes at "the side of the Parliament House".

With Thomas dead, there was nobody who could either implicate or clear Henry Percy of any involvement in the plot. His failure to ensure that Thomas took the Oath of Supremacy upon his appointment as a gentleman pensioner, and their meeting on 4 November, constituted damning evidence, and the Privy Council also suspected that had the plot succeeded, he would have been Elizabeth's protector. With insufficient evidence to convict him he was charged with contempt, fined £30,000 and stripped of all public offices. He remained in the Tower until 1621.

== Bibliography ==
- Bengsten, Fiona (2005), Sir William Waad, Lieutenant of the Tower, and the Gunpowder Plot (illustrated ed.), Victoria, Canada: Trafford Publishing, ISBN 1-4120-5541-5
- De Fonblanque, Edward Barrington (1887), Annals of the house of Percy, from the conquest to the opening of the nineteenth century, vol. 2, London: R Clay and Sons
- De Fonblanque, Edward Barrington (1887a), Annals of the house of Percy, from the conquest to the opening of the nineteenth century, part 4, London: R Clay and Sons
- Dixon, William Hepworth (2009) [1869], Her Majesty's Tower, vol. 2, Charleston, South Carolina: BiblioBazaar, LLC, ISBN 978-1-103-08639-9
- Fraser, Antonia (2005) [1996], The Gunpowder Plot, London: Phoenix, ISBN 0-7538-1401-3
- Gerard, John (1871), John Morris (ed.), The condition of Catholics under James I : Father Gerard's narrative of the Gunpowder Plot, vol. 1, London: Longmans, Green
- Haynes, Alan (2005) [1994], The Gunpowder Plot: Faith in Rebellion, Sparkford, England: Hayes and Sutton, ISBN 0-7509-4215-0
- Nicholls, Mark (1991), Investigating Gunpowder plot, Manchester: Manchester University Press, ISBN 0-7190-3225-3
- Northcote Parkinson, C. (1976), Gunpowder, Treason and Plot, London: Weidenfeld and Nicolson, ISBN 0-297-77224-4
- Sharpe, J. A. (2005), Remember, remember: a cultural history of Guy Fawkes Day, London: Harvard University Press, ISBN 0-674-01935-0
- Tesimond, Oswald (1973), Francis Edwards (ed.), The Gunpowder Plot, The Narrative of Oswald Tesimond alias Greenway, London: The Folio Society, ISBN 0-85067-068-3
