= Catesby (surname) =

Catesby is an English surname. Notable people with the surname include:

- John Catesby (died 1486), British judge
- John Catesby (MP for Warwickshire) (died 1405), MP for Warwickshire (UK Parliament constituency)
- John Catesby (MP for Northamptonshire), MP for Northamptonshire (UK Parliament constituency) in 1425 and 1429
- Mark Catesby (1683–1749), English naturalist
- Robert Catesby (1573–1605), English leader of the Gunpowder Plot
- William Catesby (1450–1485), one of King Richard III of England's principal councillors, Chancellor of the Exchequer and Speaker of the House of Commons
- William Catesby (died 1478), English landowner and MP for Northamptonshire in 1449 and 1453
- William Catesby, High Sheriff of Warwickshire in 1371
