= Bryn Hall, Ashton-in-Makerfield =

Coordinates: 53.511°N 2.623°W

Bryn Hall
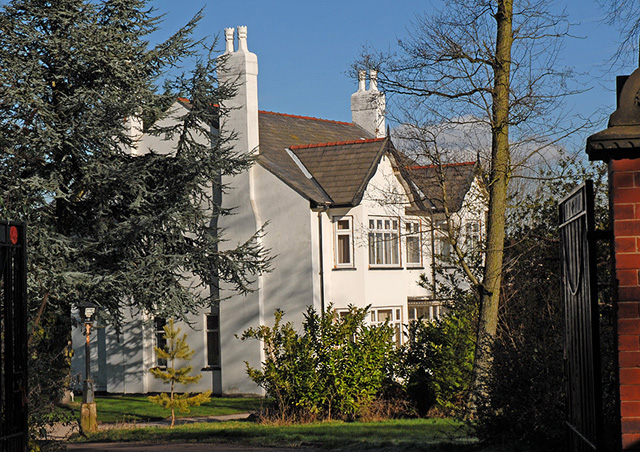
- Bryn Hall
- Interactive map of Bryn Hall
- Location: Bryn Park, Ashton-in-Makerfield, Metropolitan Borough of Wigan, Greater Manchester

Bryn Hall, also called Brynne Hall, is situated in Bryn Park, Ashton-in-Makerfield, Greater Manchester.

== History ==
=== Old Bryn Hall ===
The Ashton-in-Makerfield seat of the Gerard family was Bryn Hall, in their estate Bryn Park. Brynne Hall became the seat of the Gerard family by the marriage of William Gerard to the daughter and sole heiress of Peter de Brynne in 1250. In 1564 it was the birthplace of Jesuit John Gerard. The estate is now used for arable purposes, although part of it has been used for the Landgate housing development. It has been suggested that the site of the Old Hall should be excavated to find the remains of the house; however, the landowner has dug it up.

=== New Bryn Hall ===
New Bryn Hall was built by a different section of the family. It was erected during the reign of Edward VI and was built around a courtyard and entered by crossing a narrow bridge over a moat that surrounded the property. The hall had a gatehouse secured by huge doors. A porch led to the great hall, which had a railed gallery along one side used to observe entertainments below. The gallery was supported by richly carved double pilasters, which were later removed to Garswood Hall (The original stone footings of this building were no more than 40 feet square, so the 'great' hall wasn't as 'great' as you might imagine).

Thomas Gerard was High Sheriff of Lancashire in 1557. His son, Thomas Gerard, was created Baronet Gerard of Bryn in 1611. The Baronet's brother, Fr. John Gerard, was later ordained a Roman Catholic priest of the Society of Jesus and left behind a detailed memoir of his underground ministry in Elizabethan England

The Roman Catholic priest Fr. Edmund Arrowsmith, who was canonized by Pope Paul VI in 1970 as one of the Forty Martyrs of England and Wales, was related to the Gerards on his mother's side, and after his execution in 1628 his hand was reportedly cut off and preserved at the Hall in a white silk bag; it was referred to as the 'holy hand'. The Gerards were Royalists during the English Civil War. In 1651, Charles II travelled through Wigan and lodged at Bryn Hall on his way from Scotland to his ultimate defeat at the Battle of Worcester.

In the early 1600s the Gerards left Bryn Hall for nearby Garswood Hall before moving into New Hall, which dates to around 1692 and which they obtained from the Launder family; it has since been renamed Garswood Hall. New Bryn was later demolished.

Later, another 'Bryn Hall' was built, on a different site some distance from the original, by an offshoot of the Gerard family (Richard Gerard in marriage to Margaret Baldwin). The Crippin family moved into this hall and developed coal mining on the estate. In 1870 20 men were killed and 1873 six men were killed in explosions at Bryn Hall Colliery on the Bryn Hall Estate. Bryn Hall was home to colliery owner Edward Frederick Crippin.

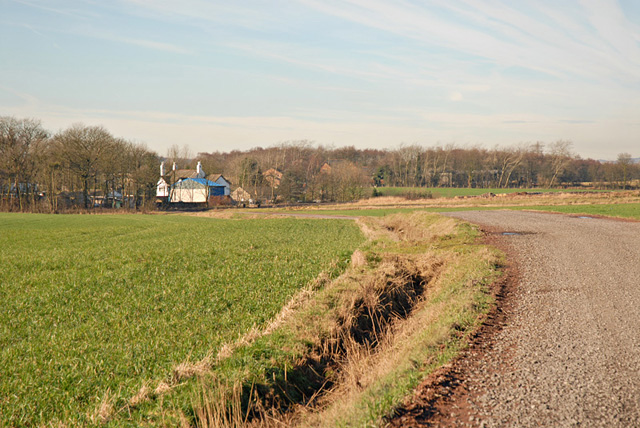
Bryn Hall from Bryn Gates Lane
