= Ashby St Ledgers =

Village in Northamptonshire, England

Coordinates: 52.30°N 01.16°W

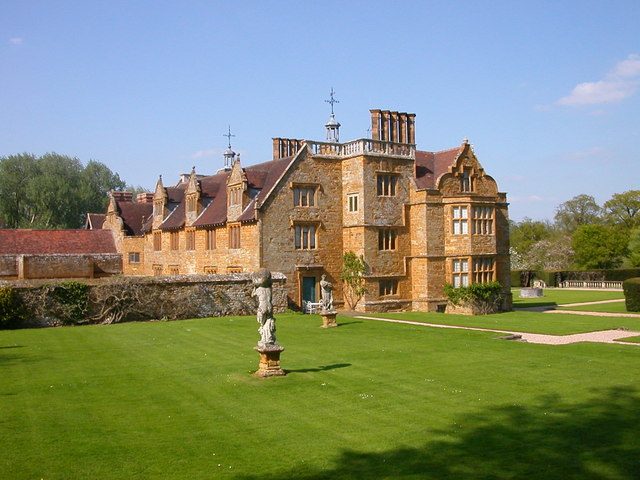
- The manor house where the Gunpowder Plot was reportedly planned

- Location within Northamptonshire
- Population: 173 (2011 Census)
- OS grid reference: SP5768
  - London: 78 miles (126 km)
- Unitary authority: West Northamptonshire
- Ceremonial county: Northamptonshire
- Region: East Midlands
- Country: England
- Sovereign state: United Kingdom
- Post town: RUGBY
- Postcode district: CV23
- Dialling code: 01788
- Police: Northamptonshire
- Fire: Northamptonshire
- Ambulance: East Midlands
- UK Parliament: Daventry

Ashby St Ledgers is a village in the West Northamptonshire district of Northamptonshire, England. The post town is Rugby in Warwickshire. The population of the civil parish at the 2011 census was 173. The Manor House is famous for being a location for the planning of the Gunpowder Plot in 1605. As of 2023, the property had been restored and can be rented for a fee.

== Location ==
The nearest large towns are Rugby, 5 miles (8 km) north west, and Daventry, 3 miles (5 km) south. The A5 road, following the course of the Roman Watling Street, passes about a mile east. Rugby has the nearest railway station on the West Coast Main Line, with trains to London Euston and several other parts of the country. It is about 5 miles (8 km) north via the A5 to the M1 London to Yorkshire motorway junction 18 and about 7 miles (11 km) south to junction 16.

== History ==
Ashby St Ledgers was first mentioned in the Domesday Book, which gave the place name as Ascebi ("ash tree settlement"). In Norman times, a church was erected on the site, dedicated to Saint Leodegarius, from whom the modern-day name is derived.

== Notable buildings ==
=== Manor House ===
The manor was given as a gift to Hugh de Grandmesnil by William the Conqueror and passed to various other occupants until 1375, when it passed into the Catesby family and became their principal residence.

In 1268 the manor passed to Edmund Crouchback as William de Ashby had murdered a man in Catesby Priory.

The manor was briefly confiscated after the attainder and execution of William Catesby, one of Richard III's counsellors, after the defeat at the Battle of Bosworth in 1485, but was later returned to his son, George. It passed down the male line to Robert Catesby's father, Sir William Catesby, who managed to hold on to the property in spite of massive debts caused by recusancy fines and years of imprisonment for his brave adherence to the Roman Catholic faith.

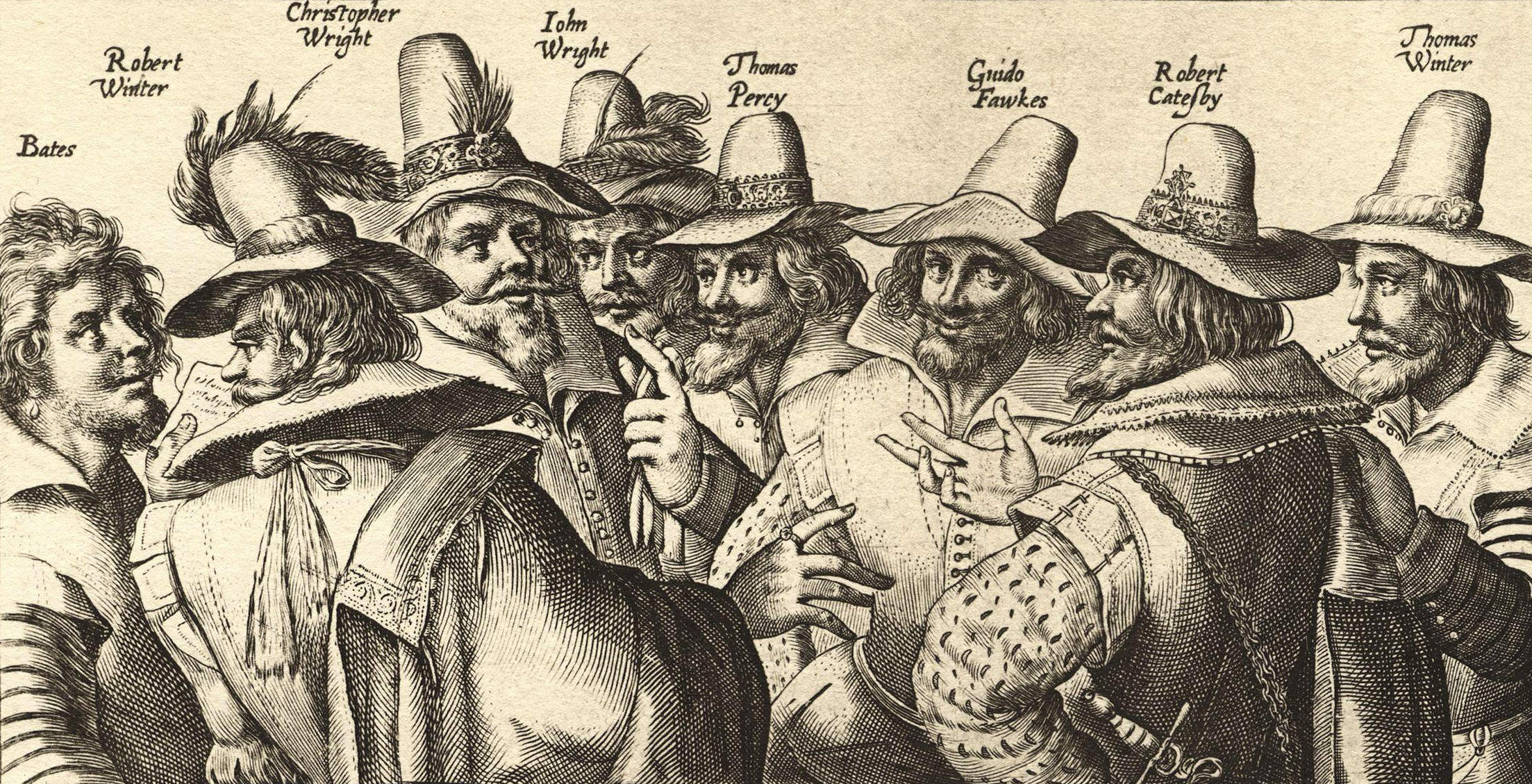
A contemporaneous engraving of the conspirators (detail). By Crispijn van de Passe the Elder. Use a cursor to explore

The manor's central location was convenient to the houses of the Catesbys' many friends and relations, which supposedly made Ashby St Ledgers a type of 'Command Centre' during the planning of the Gunpowder Plot. In the room above the Gatehouse, with its privacy from the main house and clear view of the surrounding area, Robert Catesby, his servant Thomas Bates and the other conspirators are said to have planned a great deal of the Gunpowder Plot. Catesby was killed with some other plotters at Holbeche House, whereas his servant was executed in the following January.

Following Robert Catesby's death in 1605, the manor was confiscated by the crown as the property of a traitor. However, Lady Anne Catesby had a life interest in a large portion of the property, given her by her husband at their marriage. This preserved a portion of the estate from alienation, and though an attempt was made in 1618 to reverse that, the settlement remained. In 1612, it was purchased by Bryan I'Anson (1560-1634), Sheriff of the City of London. He was the father of Sir Bryan I'Anson, 1st Bt., of Ashby St Ledgers; Gentleman of the Bedchamber to Charles I of England. In 1703, Esther I'Anson (Sir Bryan's elder brother John's great-granddaughter) sold the manor to Joseph Ashley, a London draper. When his great nephew, also called Joseph Ashley, died in 1798, the manor passed to his daughter, Mary, who was the wife of Sir Joseph Senhouse. Their daughter, Elizabeth, married Joseph Pocklington in 1835, and the manor remained in their family until 1903, when it was sold to Ivor Guest, 1st Viscount Wimborne, who had previously rented it for hunting.

Viscount Wimborne's grandson and namesake, Ivor Guest, 3rd Viscount Wimborne, sold the estate in 1976. It passed through a series of owners, including the British Airways Pension Fund, who separated the manor house from the rest of the estate. In 1998 the 3rd Viscount's son Ivor Guest, 4th Viscount Wimborne, bought the house, which had fallen into neglect, and restored it over two years. It was purchased by his cousin, Henry Guest, and his wife Nova.

The original medieval manor house was gradually replaced by later buildings, starting with a new range probably erected by the Catesbys in the early Tudor period. The I'Ansons created the main façade and an adjacent tower in the first half of the 17th century, together with another freestanding building across the court from the surviving medieval building. After being widowed in 1828, Mary Senhouse took up residence in the manor and expanded it in Jacobean revival style; a lifesize oil painting on the cellar door of a "Herculean" figure brandishing a club dates to this period and presumably alludes to the Guy Fawkes association of the house. The house was further expanded throughout the 19th century and then under the ownership of the Wimborns extensively remodelled by Edwin Lutyens, who worked on it for 40 years, the longest commission of his career, while also carrying out other commissions in the village. He created a new garden façade and a new range with its own tower, and behind the Jacobean façade, new Edwardian rooms with the floor lowered to give added height to the interiors. Rubble stone was used for the new building to blend with the original cut stone; some salvaged antique building elements were also used, including a complete medieval house from Ipswich that had been on exhibit in London in 1908. Lutyens' interiors were partially modified in the late 20th century, including demolition of the north wing, but the house was restored by the 4th Viscount Wimborne at the start of the 21st century.

The Baker family bought the 2,337-acre (9.46 km^{2}) Ashby St Ledgers estate from the British Airways Pension Fund in 1982. It includes an organic dairy farm, a country sports centre and Chapel Farm, which 150 years ago was the home of Thomas Arnold, the headmaster of Rugby School. The Bakers sold the estate to The Crown Estate in 2005. It will continue to be run as an agricultural business, but governed by its Rural Directorate.

=== Other buildings ===
The church is dedicated to Saint Leodegarius and has wall paintings showing the Passion of Christ ca. 1500, with 18 scenes, and the flagellation of St Margaret, ca. 1325.

The village has a pub, the Olde Coach House Inn.

Ashby Lodge, a house built by Londoner George Arnold in the early 1720s on the edge of the manor estate, was demolished in the 1920s.
