= John Gerard (Jesuit) =

English Jesuit priest

John Gerard (4 October 1564 – 27 July 1637) was a priest of the Society of Jesus who operated a secret ministry of the underground Catholic Church in England during the Elizabethan era.

He was born into the English nobility as the second son of Sir Thomas Gerard at Old Bryn Hall, near Ashton-in-Makerfield, Lancashire. After attending seminary and being ordained abroad, Gerard returned to England covertly shortly after the 1588 defeat of the Spanish Armada. Gerard not only successfully hid from the English authorities for eight years before his capture but also endured extensive torture, escaped from the Tower of London, recovered and continued with his covert mission until the exposure of the Gunpowder Plot made it impossible to continue.

After his escape to Catholic Europe, Gerard was instructed by his Jesuit superiors to write a book about his life in Latin. An English translation by Philip Caraman was published in 1951 as John Gerard: The Autobiography of an Elizabethan and is a rare first-hand account of the dangerous cloak-and-dagger world of a Catholic priest in Elizabethan England. Ignatius Press published a second edition in 2012 under the title The Autobiography of a Hunted Priest: John Gerard, S.J..

== Early life ==
John Gerard was born 4 October 1564, the second son of Sir Thomas Gerard of Bryn Hall, and Elizabeth, daughter and co-heiress of Sir John Port of Derbyshire. In 1569, when John Gerard was five years old, his father was imprisoned for plotting the rescue of Mary, Queen of Scots, from Tutbury Castle. His release in 1571 may have been influenced by his cousin Sir Gilbert Gerard who was Attorney General at that time. During that time John and his brother were placed with Protestant relatives, but his father obtained for them a Catholic tutor.

In August 1577, at age 12, he was sent to the English College at Douai, which relocated the following March to Rheims. At the age of 15 he spent a year at Exeter College, Oxford, which was followed by about a year of home-study of Koine Greek and Ecclesiastical Latin under a tutor, a Mr Leutner (Edmund Lewkenor, brother of Sir Lewes Lewknor Master of the Ceremonies to King James I). He then went to the Jesuit Clermont College in Paris. After some months there, followed by an illness and convalescence, in the latter part of 1581 he went to Rouen to see Jesuit priest Robert Persons.

== First mission ==
As Gerard had left for Clermont without the requisite travel permit, upon his return to England, he was arrested by customs officials upon landing at Dover. While his companions were sent to London, he was released in the custody of a Protestant in-law. But after three months, having still not attended Anglican services, he was remanded to the Marshalsea prison. He spent a little over a year there in company with William Hartley, Stephen Rowsham, John Adams, and William Bishop. In the spring of 1585, Anthony Babington, who was later executed for treason for his involvement in a plot to free the Catholic Mary, Queen of Scots, posted bond to secure Gerard's release.

== Second mission ==
Gerard then went to Rome and was given another mission on behalf of the Jesuits to England. In November 1588, three months after the defeat of the Spanish Armada, Gerard and Edward Oldcorne landed in Norfolk to begin their task of sustaining Catholics among the English people. Having made his way to Norwich he met there the Lord of the manor of Grimston, a Recusant called Edward Yelverton. After a two days’ journey on horseback, Gerard—now Mr. Thompson—settled down quietly in the Manor House at Grimston, 8 miles East of King's Lynn, as an honoured guest. He was in great danger, but his retreat was believed as safe as any south of the Humber. Gerard was no ordinary man. He had indeed strange powers of attraction and fascination. He was introduced to the chief families of the neighbourhood, Walpoles and Woodhouses among others, and though only twenty-four he had extraordinary influence among them. His stay in Grimston lasted seven or eight months. After that he lived for some time at Lawshall, near Bury St Edmunds. Eventually, Gerard was taken to the leader of the English Jesuits, Father Henry Garnet. Gerard soon became a very popular figure in the Catholic underground. To stay above suspicion, Gerard cultivated a respectable public image. By way of disguises, he appeared very secular, being versed in gambling and wearing fashionable clothes. Gerard wrote of many escapes from the law and of occasions when he hid in priest holes, which could often be as small as 1 meter tall and half a meter wide. In 1591 Gerard became the chaplain to the Wiseman household, Braddocks, led by William and Jane Wiseman. The household included Jane Wiseman who was William's widowed mother. Gerard persuaded her to create a new home for herself and a chaplain at the Wisemans' dower-house of Bullocks (not to be confused with their main house which was called Braddocks) which would become as additional centre for Catholicism and priest harbouring.

== Capture and torture ==
Gerard was finally captured in London on 23 April 1594, together with Nicholas Owen. He was tried, found guilty and sent to the Compter in the Poultry. Later he was moved to the Clink prison where he was able to meet regularly with other imprisoned English Catholics. Due to his continuation of this work, he was sent to the Salt Tower in the Tower of London, where he was further questioned and tortured by being repeatedly suspended from chains on the dungeon wall. The main aim of Gerard's torturers was to find out the London lodgings of Henry Garnet, so that they could arrest him. However, Gerard refused to answer any questions that involved others, or to name them. He later insisted that he never broke down, a fact borne out by the files of the Tower.

Henry Garnet wrote about Gerard:

Twice he has been hung up by the hands with great cruelty on the part of others and no less patience on his own. The examiners say he is exceedingly obstinate and a great friend either of God or of the devil, for they say they cannot extract a word from his lips, save that, amidst his torments, he speaks the word, "Jesus". Recently they took him to the rack, where the torturers and examiners stood ready for work. But when he entered the place, he at once threw himself on his knees and with a loud voice prayed to God that ... he would give him strength and courage to be rent to pieces before he might speak a word that would be injurious to any person or to the divine glory. And seeing him so resolved, they did not torture him.

== Escape from the Tower ==
Gerard's most famous exploit is believed to have been masterminded by Nicholas Owen. With help from other members of the Catholic underground, Gerard, along with John Arden, escaped on a rope strung across the Tower moat during the night of 4 October 1597. Despite the fact that his hands were still mangled from the tortures he had undergone, he succeeded in climbing down. He even arranged for the escape of his gaoler (jailer), with whom he had become friendly, and who he knew would be held responsible for the jailbreak. It is speculated that he befriended the jailer so that if circumstance favoured an escape, it could be turned to his advantage. Immediately following his escape, he joined Henry Garnet and Robert Catesby in Uxbridge. Later, Gerard moved to the house of Dowager Elizabeth Vaux at Harrowden, near Wellingborough, Northamptonshire. From this base of operations, he continued his priestly ministry, and reconciled many to the Catholic Church, including Sir Everard Digby (one of the future conspirators in the Gunpowder Plot).

== Later life ==
For the next eight years he continued his ministry among the English people before he was recalled to the continent to train Jesuits for the English Mission. He was accused by Robert Catesby's servant Thomas Bates of complicity in the Gunpowder Plot; in May 1604 he had celebrated Mass with two of the plotters, John and Christopher Wright, at the Duck and Drake Inn in The Strand ignorant of their purpose after the plotters had met in another room of the Inn and swore themselves to secrecy. While on the run, Gerard stayed at Harrowden again. While hiding in a priest hole during a nine-day search of the house, he wrote a refutation of Bates' charges, and arranged to have it printed and scattered about the streets in London. He eventually escaped from there to London. He left the country with financial aid from Elizabeth Vaux, slipping away disguised as a footman in the retinue of the Spanish Ambassador, on the very day of Henry Garnet's execution. Gerard continued the work of the Jesuits in Europe, where he wrote his autobiography on the orders of his superiors. He died in 1637, aged 72, at the English College, Rome, a seminary.

== Writings ==
- The Autobiography of a hunted priest (trans. from Latin to English by Philip Caraman), San Francisco, Ignatius Press, 2012, ISBN 978-1-58617-450-7
- A Narrative of the Gunpowder Plot ISBN 978-1-72975-539-6

== Bibliography ==
- Bernard Basset: The English Jesuits, London, 1967.
- Philip Caraman (trans.), John Gerard: The Autobiography of an Elizabethan, London, Longmans, Green & Co., 1951. With a foreword by Graham Greene.
- Francis Edwards (ed.): The Elizabethan Jesuits, London, 1981.
