= Huddington =

Village in Worcestershire, England

Coordinates: 52.214312°N 2.084398°W

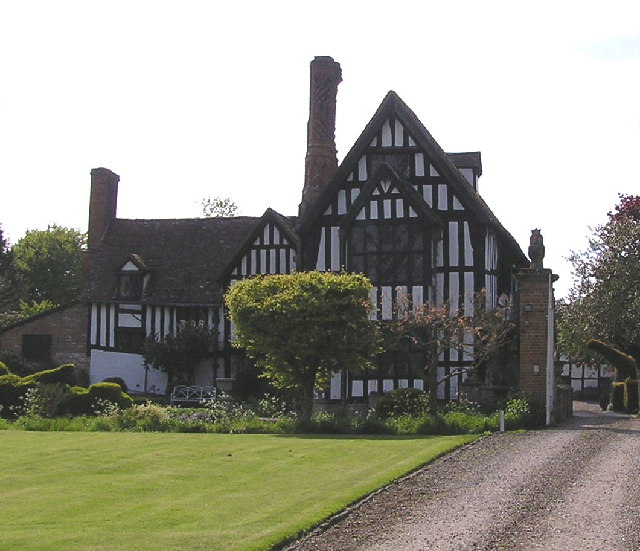
- Huddington Court

- Location within Worcestershire
- Population: 101 (2021)
- Civil parish: Huddington
- District: Wychavon
- Shire county: Worcestershire
- Region: West Midlands
- Country: England
- Sovereign state: United Kingdom
- Post town: Droitwich
- Postcode district: WR9
- Police: West Mercia
- Fire: Hereford and Worcester
- Ambulance: West Midlands
- UK Parliament: Mid Worcestershire

Huddington is a village in Worcestershire, England. It had a population of 101 at the 2021 census.

== Location ==
Huddington is located 5 miles (8.0 km) east of Worcester and 5 miles (8.0 km) south east of Droitwich Spa.

== History & Amenities ==
The name Huddington derives from the Old English Hudaingtūn meaning 'settlement connected with Huda'.

Huddington is associated with Huddington Court and the Worcestershire element in the Gunpowder Plot.
