= Oswald Tesimond =

English Jesuit priest involved in the Gunpowder Plot

Oswald Tesimond, SJ (1563 – 23 August 1636) was an English Jesuit born in either Northumberland or York who, while not a direct conspirator, had some knowledge of the Gunpowder Plot beforehand.

== Life ==
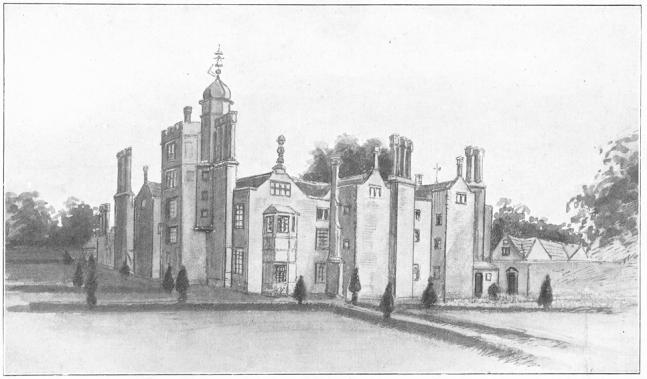
Hindlip Hall

He was educated in York, in the Royal School of William and Mary in the Horse Fayre, which cost no money to attend. Guy Fawkes, Edward Oldcorne and brothers Christopher and John Wright were among Tesimond's classmates, all of whom would become involved in the Gunpowder Plot. In 1580, at the age of seventeen, he entered English College in Rome. After three years of philosophy, Tesimond, with permission from the Jesuits' cardinal protector, Giovanni Morone joined the Society of Jesus in April 1584.

Tesimond spent most of his adult life in Italy, under the name of Philip Beaumont, (Beamond, Bémont). Later, Tesimond studied, among other things, theology in Messina, where he afterwards taught philosophy. He was ordained, some time before he left on the English Mission, in November 1587. He arrived at Gravesend on 9 March 1598. Tesimond worked for eight years as a missioner with Edward Oldcorne in Worcestershire and Warwickshire under the name "Father Greenway", primarily out of Hindlip Hall. He was professed as a Jesuit on 28 October 1603.

He would later become somewhat involved in the Gunpowder Plot. He effectively documented his experiences in a narrative which he wrote sometime after. He lived the later part of his life in various places, including Saint-Omer and Naples, where he died on 23 August 1636 at age 73.

== Gunpowder Plot ==
Oswald Tesimond played a small role in the Gunpowder plot; while not directly involved, he knew of the plot from the confessional, and the motives of the conspirators. It is a near-certainty that the actual plot was divulged to Tesimond by Robert Catesby, someone who was deeply involved. Catesby had asked for advice in general terms about the morality of collaterally causing the death of innocents. At the time, Tesimond assumed he was referring to fighting in the Dutch Wars, but afterwards became uneasy. Tesimond in turn revealed his disquiet to his Jesuit superior, Henry Garnet, in confession. Garnet judged that he had received this information under the seal of the confessional, and that canon law forbade him to repeat it, but urged Tesimond to dissuade Catesby. Garnet later told Catesby that the Pope did not want English Catholics to cause disturbances as that would only bring harsher treatment, but Catesby was unmoved. Tesimond and Garnet kept their knowledge secret, which constituted a violation of the law.

Sir Edward Coke conducted the prosecution for the government – an easy one, since the conspirators had no legal representation – and through his speeches, presented the plot as a Jesuit conspiracy. Thomas Wintour, at his later execution, cleared all Jesuits (Tesimond specifically and most especially), from any involvement, counseling or advising regarding the plot.

== Flight ==
Tesimond's arrest warrant was sworn out on 15 January 1606, describing him in detail: "..of a reasonable stature, black hair, a brown beard cut close on the cheeks and left broad on the chin, somewhat long-visaged, lean in the face but of a good red complexion, his nose somewhat long and sharp at the end, his hands slender and long fingers, his body slender, his legs of a good proportion, his feet somewhat long and slender. (Excerpt from the proclamation for Tesimond's arrest.)

Tesimond was able to escape arrest. He evaded the constables of London, then made his way to safe houses in Essex and Suffolk. He then proceeded to sail to Calais among a cargo of dead pigs by passing as the owner of the load. He then went to Boulogne, and then on to Saint-Omer.

== Later life ==
Tesimond, after escaping arrest, spent some years in Saint-Omer. He wrote a narrative based on the happenings of the Gunpowder Plot. Written in Italian, Tesimond's narrative probably comprises one of the most detailed and complete accounts of the plot itself. It may have been based on another Latin account of an unknown and unnamed secular priest. The narrative was sent to Rome to better inform the Jesuit authorities.

Later, from the year 1617, Tesimond was prefect of studies and consulter in Messina. He held this position there for many years, among time spent in Rome during the most of 1621, and among other minor occupations. After some time there, he moved to Naples, Italy, where he died in 1636. This was documented in a letter by Sir Edwin Rich to James I of England, which warned the king against accepting any gift he might receive, which might consist of poisoned clothing from Tesimond; in England, vigilance was still elevated after the events that transpired following the Gunpowder Plot.
