= John and Christopher Wright =

Members of the Gunpowder Plot 1605

Christopher and John Wright
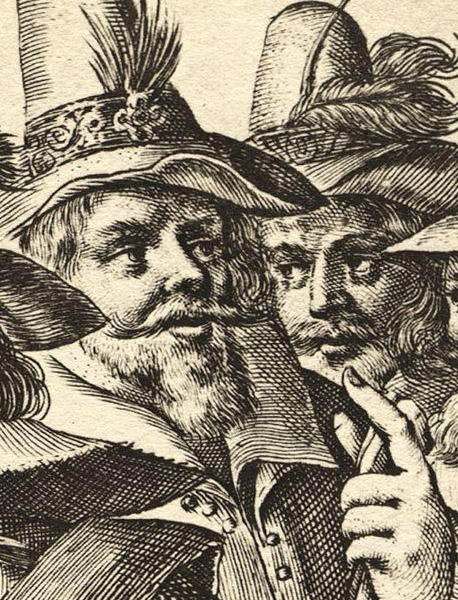
- A contemporary engraving of Christopher (left) and John Wright, from a larger image by Crispijn van de Passe
- Born: January 1568 (JW), 1570 (CW); Yorkshire, Kingdom of England
- Died: 8 November 1605 (both) (JW; aged 37) (CW; aged 34–35); Holbeche House, Staffordshire, Kingdom of England
- Cause of death: Gunshot wound
- Spouse(s): Dorothy (JW), Margaret Ward (CW)
- Children: 1 (JW)
- Motive: Gunpowder Plot, a conspiracy to assassinate King James VI and I and members of the Houses of Parliament

Details
- Role: Non-specific
- Enlisted: Early 1604 (JW), Spring 1605 (CW)

John Wright (January 1568 – 8 November 1605), and Christopher Wright (1570 – 8 November 1605), were brothers and members of the group of provincial English Catholics who planned the failed Gunpowder Plot of 1605, a conspiracy to assassinate King James I by blowing up the House of Lords. Their sister married another plotter, Thomas Percy. Educated at the same school in York, the Wrights had early links with Guy Fawkes, the man left in charge of the explosives stored in the undercroft beneath the House of Lords. As known recusants the brothers were on several occasions arrested for reasons of national security. Both were also members of the Earl of Essex's rebellion of 1601.

John was one of the first men to join the conspiracy, which was led by Robert Catesby. Christopher joined in March 1605. At about midnight on 4 November Fawkes was discovered and arrested, following which John, Christopher and the rest of the conspirators travelled across the Midlands, attempting to gain support for a popular uprising. Eventually the group opted to wait for the authorities at Holbeche House, on the border of Staffordshire. On 8 November the Sheriff of Worcester arrived with a large group of armed men, and both brothers were killed in the ensuing firefight.

== Family and life before 1604 ==
John and Christopher Wright were born to Robert Wright and his second wife, Ursula Rudston, daughter of Nicholas and Jane Rudston of Hayton. John was baptised at Welwick in Yorkshire, on 16 January 1568, and Christopher was born in 1570. Their sister Ursula married Marmaduke Ward of Givendale, Mulwith and Newby in 1584, and their first born child (John and Christopher's niece) would become the Venerable Mary Ward founder of the Sisters of Loreto (also known as the Institute of the Blessed Virgin Mary). Their sister, Martha, married the gunpowder plotter Thomas Percy in 1591.

The brothers were pupils at St Peter's School in York, along with Guy Fawkes, whose name has become synonymous with the Gunpowder Plot. Although outwardly conformist, the school's headmaster John Pulleine came from a notable family of Yorkshire recusants, and his predecessor at St Peter's had spent 20 years in prison for his recusancy. Three Catholic priests, Oswald Tesimond, Edward Oldcorn and Robert Middleton, were also educated at St Peter's. John and Christopher were both married, to Dorothy and Margaret respectively. John had a daughter, born some time in the late 1590s.

As a precautionary measure, in 1596 they were each arrested during Queen Elizabeth I's illness. They were incarcerated at the White Lyon prison in 1601 for their involvement in the Earl of Essex's rebellion. Both were skilled swordsmen, and John was renowned for his courage. The Jesuit priest Oswald Tesimond wrote that he possessed a "good physique and sound constitution. Rather on the tall side, his features were pleasing. He was somewhat taciturn in manner, but very loyal to his friends, even if his friends were few". Christopher's appearance was slightly different from that of his brother, "not like him in face, as being fatter and a lighter coloured hair and taller of person". According to Father John Gerard, John's involvement with Essex coincided with his conversion to Catholicism. Gerard also noted that John's household, Twigmoor Hall in Lincolnshire, was a place where "he had Priests come often, both for his spiritual comfort and their own in corporal helps", although the government's description, "a Popish college for traitors", was somewhat less favourable. Following his conversion John became "a man of exemplary life". Two years later, as the queen's health waned, a nervous government ensured that John and Christopher were again imprisoned, the English antiquarian William Camden describing them as men "hunger-starved for innovation". Christopher may have travelled to Spain in 1603 using the alias Anthony Dutton, seeking Spanish support for English Catholics, although biographer Mark Nicholls mentions that Dutton's role may have been attributed to Christopher by Fawkes and Thomas Wintour, held in the Tower of London after the failure of the plot.

== Gunpowder Plot ==
Early in 1604 Robert Catesby, a Catholic who had lost patience with King James I's lack of toleration of Catholics, invited his cousin Thomas Wintour to a meeting at which John was also present. Catesby proposed to blow up "the Parliament House with gunpowder", killing the king and his government, as in "that place, have they done us all the mischief". Catesby had not then given up hope on foreign help, and so he sent Wintour to the continent to meet with the Constable of Castille. Wintour also met with Welsh spy Hugh Owen, who introduced him to Guy Fawkes, a man with whose name Catesby was familiar. (Note: Fraser suggests that this familiarity might have arisen from anyone "within recusant circles", but also because John and Fawkes attended the same school.) A fifth conspirator, Thomas Percy, joined them several weeks later. Percy was related to the Wright family by marriage, having wed John's sister, Martha. The group met on 20 May 1604 at the Duck and Drake inn, in the fashionable Strand district of London. After the meeting they swore an oath of secrecy on a prayer book and celebrated Mass in another room with Father John Gerard, who was ignorant of their purpose.

From these early meetings, according to biographer Mark Nicholls, John exhibited "little sign of doubt or scruple thereafter". He remained close to the heart of the conspiracy, moving his family to Lapworth in Warwickshire, and stabling horses there. By March 1605 Christopher had joined the conspiracy as well, but in October that year, as the plan was nearing its culmination, its existence was revealed to the authorities by an anonymous letter delivered to William Parker, 4th Baron Monteagle, warning him to stay away from Parliament. Uncertain of its meaning Monteagle delivered the letter to the English Secretary of State, Robert Cecil, 1st Earl of Salisbury. Monteagle's servant was closely related to Christopher's wife, Margaret, and thus the plotters soon became aware of its existence. Catesby, by then at White Webbs near Enfield Chase with the Wright brothers, decided that the letter did not constitute a sufficiently serious threat to the scheme, and he decided to forge ahead. On 4 November Percy visited his patron, Henry Percy, 9th Earl of Northumberland, to see if he could discern what rumours surrounded the letter. He returned to London and assured John, Thomas Wintour and Robert Keyes that they had nothing to be concerned about. That same evening John probably set off for the Midlands with Catesby and his servant Thomas Bates, while the others moved into their positions, ready for the planned explosion the following day. At about midnight the authorities made a search of the House of Lords, and in the chamber's undercroft they discovered and arrested Fawkes, who was guarding the gunpowder the conspirators had placed there.

As news of Fawkes's capture spread, particularly through the great houses of the Strand, Christopher deduced what had occurred and went to Thomas Wintour at the Duck and Drake inn, exclaiming "the matter is discovered". Wintour ordered him to verify the news, and on confirming that the government were seeking Thomas Percy (for whom Fawkes, using the alias "John Johnson", claimed to be working), ordered him to alert Percy. Christopher and Percy left London together, heading for Dunstable.

With the group mostly reintegrated, they spent the next two days moving across Warwickshire and Worcestershire, attempting to drum up support for a rebellion that as time passed became ever more unlikely. On 6 November, the same day they were helping to raid Warwick Castle for supplies, the brothers were identified by the Lord Chief Justice Sir John Popham as suspects. This prompted the authorities to issue a public proclamation on 7 November naming them and several of their fellow conspirators as wanted men. The group tried unsuccessfully to recruit more rebels at Hewell Grange, but on 7 November, tired and desperate, they decided to make their stand at Holbeche House, on the border of Staffordshire. On the arrival the following morning of the Sheriff of Worcester and his company of men, a gun battle broke out and Catesby, Percy, and both Wright brothers were shot. With medical attention they might have survived, but "the baser sort" among the sheriff's men hurriedly stripped them of their clothes (Christopher's boots were pulled off to reach his silk stockings), and left them to die.

Their younger sister, Alice Wright, the wife of William Redshaw, had sought to be a nurse to Princess Mary, and was lodged in the Strand. She was suspected of involvement in the Gunpowder Plot by Sir Edward Hoby and Thomas Posthumous Hoby who wrote to Cecil about her on 26 November 1605, noting she was a friend of Thomas Percy.
