= Holbeche House =

House in Kingswinford, West Midlands, United Kingdom

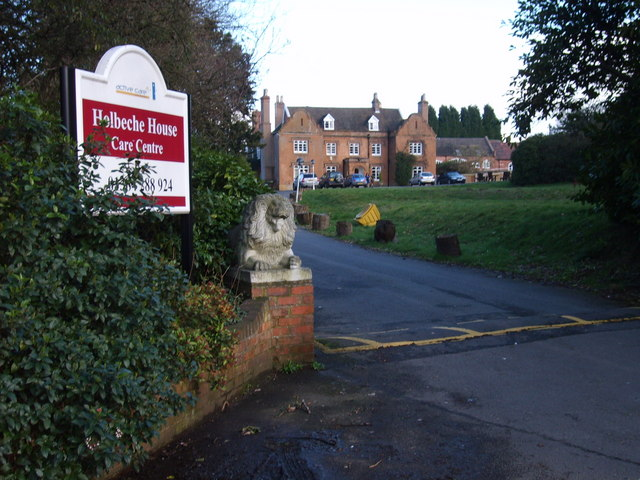
- Holbeche House was until recently a care home
- Interactive map of the Holbeche House area

General information
- Location: Kingswinford near Dudley (formerly in Staffordshire), England
- Coordinates: 52.5122°N 2.1713°W

Holbeche House (also, in some texts, Holbeach or Holbeache) is a mansion located approximately 1 mile (1.6 km) north of Kingswinford, now in the Metropolitan Borough of Dudley in the county of the West Midlands but historically in Staffordshire. Some members of the Gunpowder Plot were either killed or captured at Holbeche House in 1605.

== Gunpowder Plot ==
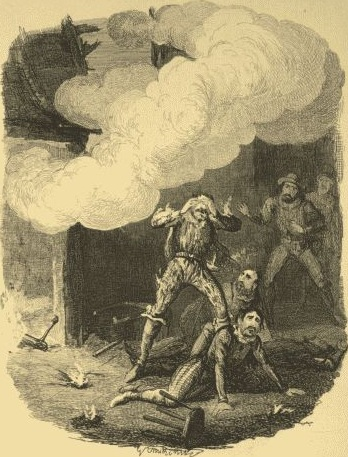
The Explosion at Holbeche, depicted by George Cruikshank (1792-1878)

Action at Holbeche House
- Part of Gunpowder Plot
Date	7 November 1605
Location	Holbeche House
Result	Government victory

Belligerents
Gunpowder plotters	Government posse

Commanders and leaders
Robert Catesby †	Richard Walsh

Strength
11 men	200 soldiers and militia

Casualties and losses
4 killed 7 wounded and captured (later executed)	None known

The Gunpowder Plot was an attempt by a small party of provincial English Catholics to blow up the House of Lords during the State Opening of Parliament, thereby killing James I and his court, as the prelude to a revolt during which a Catholic monarchy would be restored to the English throne.

It was after the failure of the plot that the fugitives took shelter in Holbeche House, owned by Stephen Lyttelton. They had taken supplies from Warwick Castle on 6 November and weapons and gunpowder from Hewell Grange on 7 November, but the powder became damp in the rain. After arriving at Holbeche House at about 10 pm, several were maimed when gunpowder left to dry in front of the fire was ignited by a stray spark. At about noon the next day, 8 November 1605, the house was surrounded by a posse led by Richard Walsh (the Sheriff of Worcestershire), originally seeking those responsible for the raid at Warwick Castle. Most of the plotters were either killed or wounded in the ensuing fight. Some walls have holes from muskets used in the storming of the house in 1605. Those still alive were taken to London and later tried and executed.

== House ==
The building was constructed in around 1600. The original house has a central block of three bays, with two stories and an attic with dormer windows, and projecting side wings with Dutch gables at each end. Some original wood panelling remains inside. New façades were added in the early 19th century, and the house was later expanded.

In 1951, it became a Grade II* listed building, as Holbeache House. It later became a private nursing home operated by Four Seasons Health Care.

The house was derelict and boarded up in 2022. Locals were campaigning to the National Trust to try and open up the house for visitors and preserve the building in 2023. The National Trust stated it would not take over the running of the house.

The house has been added to the Historic England Heritage At Risk Register.
