= Salwarpe =

Village in Worcestershire, England

Coordinates: 52.257°N 2.185°W

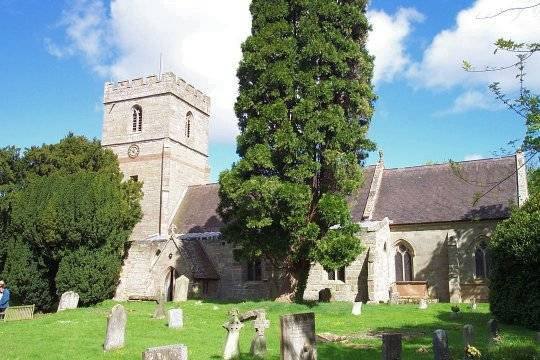
- St Michael and All Angels, Salwarpe

- Location within Worcestershire
- Civil parish: Salwarpe
- District: Wychavon
- Shire county: Worcestershire
- Region: West Midlands
- Country: England
- Sovereign state: United Kingdom
- Post town: DROITWICH
- Postcode district: WR9
- Police: West Mercia
- Fire: Hereford and Worcester
- Ambulance: West Midlands

Salwarpe is a small village and civil parish in the Wychavon district of Worcestershire, England, less than two miles south west of Droitwich, but in open country. The name is also spelled Salwarp, and in the time of John Leland was recorded as Salop. Since 2003, Salwarpe has shared a parish council with Hindlip and Martin Hussingtree.

== Etymology ==
The name Salwarpe probably derives from the Old English saluwearp meaning 'dark warp', i.e. silt deposited during flooding.

== History ==
A Saxon charter of the year 817 records that Coenwulf, King of Mercia, granted the manor of Salwarpe to Denebeorht, Bishop of Worcester, and his Priory. By the 11th century, the grant had been alienated, and a nobleman named Godwine had possession of the principal manor of Salwarpe, while his brother Leofric, Earl of Mercia, was a lesser landowner there. As Godwine was dying about 1052, Saint Wulfstan, who was Dean of Worcester, persuaded him to give his manor of Salwarpe back to Worcester Priory, but Godwine's son Ethelwine (named in the Domesday Book as being in possession in the time of King Edward) repudiated his father's Will and kept it, denying the bequest to the Priory. Salwarpe was in the ancient hundred of Clent.

By 1086, the Norman Urse d'Abetot had acquired an estate in Worcestershire which became the Barony of Salwarpe, which included Salwarpe Court, a substantial country house, later a seat of the Earls of Warwick. In 1382, this house was the birthplace of Richard de Beauchamp, 13th Earl of Warwick. It was rebuilt for a new owner, Sir John Talbot, in the time of Queen Elizabeth I. In this era, the Domesday hundreds of Clent and Cresslow were combined to form Halfshire hundred.

The ancient parish of Salwarpe contains several hamlets. The early nineteenth-century enclosure map shows Boycott, Chauson, Copcott, High Park, Hill End, Ladywood, Middleton, Newland, and Oakley, and most of these names were also recorded in the 17th century.

The Church of England parish church, dedicated to St Michael and All Angels, is unusually large for a village now so small, but it reflects greater importance in past centuries. Parts of the church are Norman.

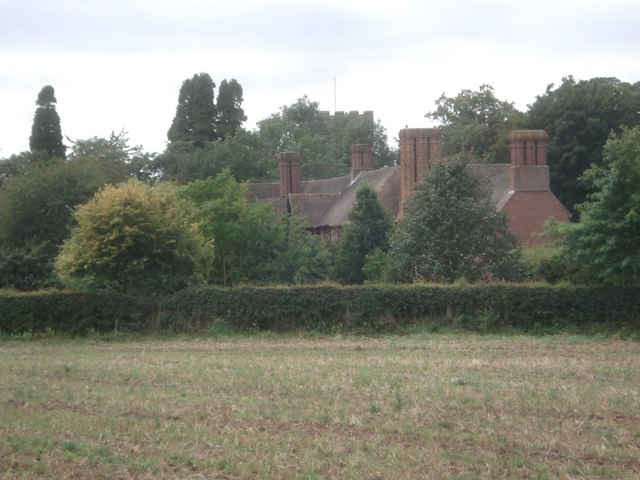
Salwarpe Court

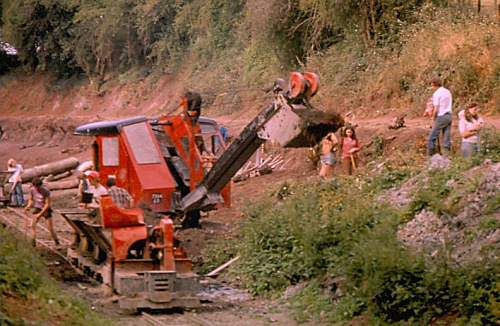
Excavation of the Droitwich Canal bed at Salwarpe in 1978

In 1868, the National Gazetteer of Great Britain and Ireland said

SALWARPE, a parish in the borough of Droitwich, upper division of Halfshire hundred, county Worcester, 5½ miles N. of Worcester, its post town, and 2 S.W. of Droitwich. The village, which is of small extent, is situated on the Droitwich canal and the river Salwarpe; the latter takes its rise under Lickey hills, thence flows 14 miles S.W. past Bromsgrove, Stoke-Prior, and Droitwich, to the Severn, at Hawford Bridge. Salwarpe, in Leland's time, was called Salop. The celebrated Earl of Warwick, Richard Beauchamp, was born here in 1351 [sic].

Salwarpe has a post box dating from the reign of Queen Victoria. The wall-mounted box just beyond the churchyard was made by the Birmingham founders, Smith & Hawkes, based in Broad Street. It was made sometime between the mid-1850s and mid 1870s when Smith & Hawkes was active in the manufacture of post-boxes. The current box is the original, though it was reset in the early 2000s when it was in danger of being replaced by the Post Office.

== Geography ==
The River Salwarpe rises near Bromsgrove and passes Stoke Prior, Upton Warren, Wychbold, Salwarpe, and Droitwich, after which it meets the River Severn at Hawford. The 18th century Droitwich Canal also passes near the village.

The BBC's Droitwich Transmitting Station, established in 1934, is a few miles north of the village.

== Notable people ==
- Richard Beauchamp, 13th Earl of Warwick, born at Salwarpe Court (1382).
- Nathaniel Torporley (1564–1632), Rector of Salwarpe (1608–1622).
- Sir John Talbot (1630–1714), soldier and politician, had his country seat at Salwarpe Court.
- William Hallifax (1655–1722), translator of Euclid, chaplain to the Levant Company, early explorer of Palmyra, chaplain to the Speaker of the House of Commons, rector of Oldswinford (1699–1722) and Salwarpe (1713–1722).
- Jennifer Harris, (1989–present), Member of the Emmanuel College team which won University Challenge 2010
