= North Claines =

Civil parish in Worcestershire, England

Coordinates: 52.234°N 2.213°W

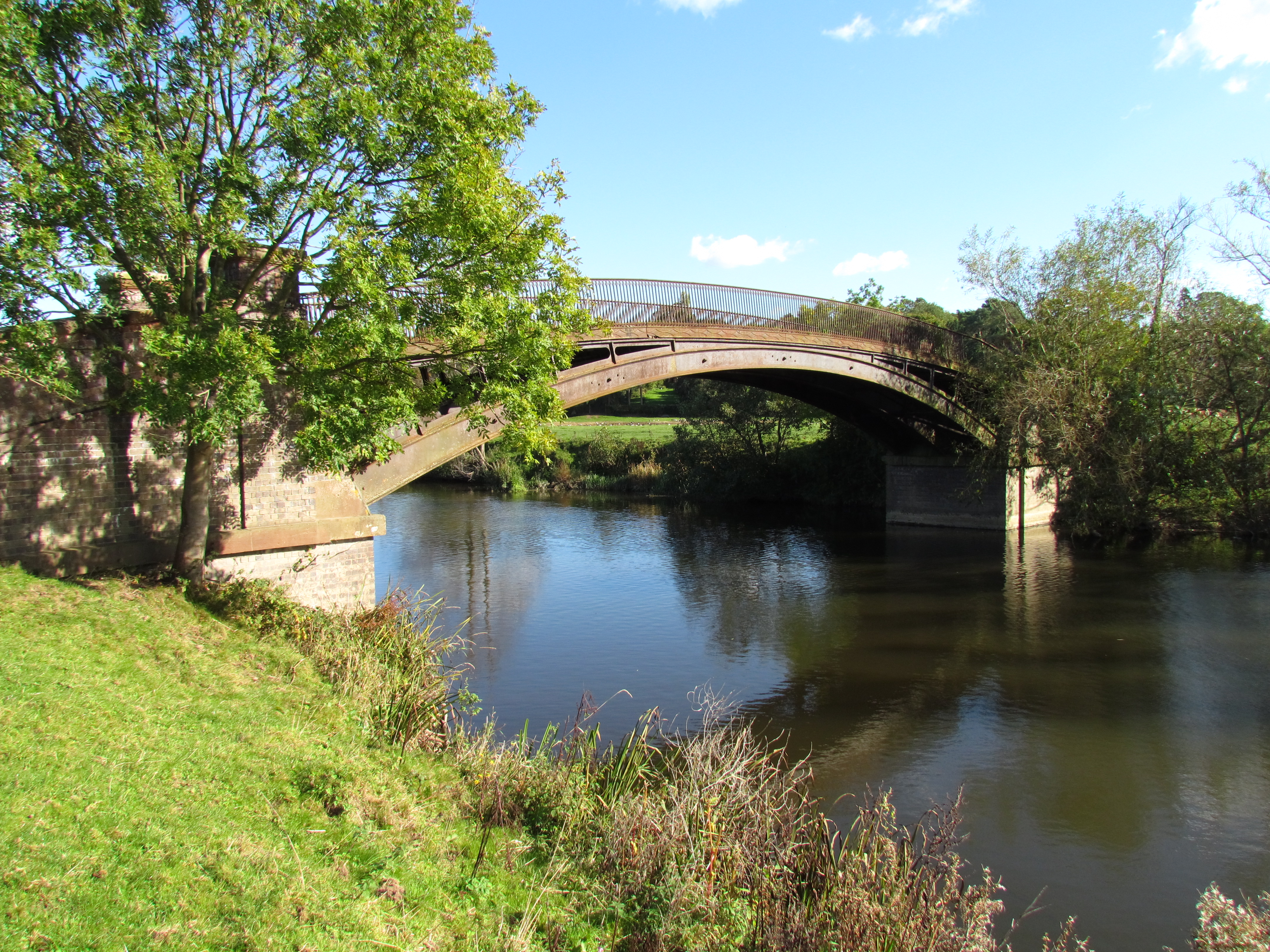
- The grade II listed Bevere bridge to an island in the River Severn on the western edge of the parish

- Location within Worcestershire
- Population: 4,460 (2021)
- OS grid reference: SO8457
- Civil parish: North Claines
- District: Wychavon
- Shire county: Worcestershire
- Region: West Midlands
- Country: England
- Sovereign state: United Kingdom
- Post town: WORCESTER
- Postcode district: WR3
- Police: West Mercia
- Fire: Hereford and Worcester
- Ambulance: West Midlands
- UK Parliament: Droitwich and Evesham

North Claines is a civil parish in Wychavon district, Worcestershire, England, immediately north of the city of Worcester. It includes the settlements of Fernhill Heath, Bevere, Lower Town, and Hawford. It is bordered to the west and north west by the River Severn and the River Salwarpe, with the Droitwich Canal running parallel to the Salwarpe.

The parish was formed in 1885 when the southern part of the parish of Claines was incorporated into Worcester under the Worcester Incorporation Act.

At the 2021 census the parish had a population of 4,460. The area of the parish was stated as 6.480 square kilometres (2.502 sq mi).

The parish has a parish council, the lowest level of local government. It is part of Lovett and North Claines ward (which had a 2021 population of 7,647) for elections to Wychavon district council.

As of January 2022 there are 30 listed buildings in the parish: Bevere House and the Mill Hall at grade II* and 28 including bridges, houses and a canal lock, at grade II.
