= Murder of Céline Figard =

Murder of a French woman in the UK

Céline Figard
- Undated photograph of Figard
- Pronunciation: French pronunciation: [selin fiɡaʁ]
- Born: 23 May 1976; Besançon, France
- Disappeared: 19 December 1995; Chieveley, Berkshire, United Kingdom
- Died: 19 December 1995 (aged 19); United Kingdom
- Cause of death: Murder by strangulation and bludgeoning
- Body discovered: Hawford, Worcestershire, United Kingdom
- Resting place: Scey-sur-Saône-et-Saint-Albin, Haute-Saône, France; 47.3957°N 5.5819°E (approximate)
- Occupation: Accountancy student

Céline Figard (French pronunciation: [selin fiɡaʁ]; 23 May 1976 – 19 December 1995) was a French woman who went missing and was murdered during a visit to the United Kingdom in December 1995. She accepted a lift from a lorry driver at Chieveley services on the M4 in Chieveley, Berkshire, on 19 December, but never arrived at her destination. Following an appeal for information on her whereabouts and police enquiries, her body was discovered on 29 December, at a lay-by on the A449 in Hawford, Worcestershire. A post-mortem determined she had been strangled and bludgeoned to death.

The case received extensive news coverage in the UK around the Christmas and New Year period, amid fears that it could be linked to a series of killings around the English Midlands, which police called the work of a "Midlands Ripper". The murder investigation included the UK's first national DNA screening programme in the hunt for a murder suspect, covering over 5,000 people.

Stuart William Morgan, a 36-year-old lorry driver from Poole, Dorset, was arrested in February 1996 after a colleague recognised his image from a photofit. Morgan was later charged with Figard's murder, and convicted in October. Detectives concluded that after raping, strangling and bludgeoning her, he carried her body in his vehicle for ten days over the Christmas period before dumping it. Morgan was given a life sentence, with a recommendation to serve at least twenty years. An appeal in February 1998 was rejected by the Court of Appeal, and in 2009 the High Court turned down his application for a review of the length of his sentence. He became eligible for parole in February 2016, and has continued to maintain his innocence. He remains imprisoned at HM Prison Frankland as of 2022, having had his most recent application for parole rejected earlier in the year.

Figard was buried in the French village of Scey-sur-Saône-et-Saint-Albin, Haute-Saône, at a service attended by her family, friends and politicians in January 1996. In the UK, she is remembered in a memorial garden established at a church in the Worcestershire village of Ombersley, close to where her body was discovered.

== Background and disappearance ==
Céline Figard was born on 23 May 1976 in Besançon, France, to Martine and Bernard Figard. She had two brothers, Stephane and Nicolas, and a sister, Karine. At the time of her death, she was studying accountancy at the Lycée le Grand Chênois in Montbéliard. She developed a fondness for the United Kingdom following a 1990 visit and travelled there repeatedly.

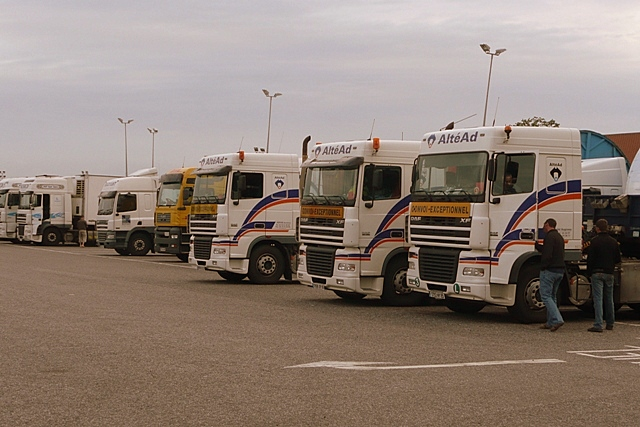
The lorry park of Chieveley Services in 2008. Figard was last seen alive here on the afternoon of 19 December 1995.

Figard spent the summer of 1995 working at a hotel in Fordingbridge, Hampshire, where her cousin Jean-Marc was head waiter, using the opportunity to improve her English. She planned to return to the UK in December to spend another two weeks with Jean-Marc. After leaving home on Monday, 18 December, she travelled with a family friend employed by a local haulage firm to the French coast, as arranged by her parents, and crossed the English Channel the following day, arriving in Ashford, Kent. She intended to travel to Fordingbridge by train; her escort found another French lorry driver, Roger Bouvier, who was willing to take her to Chieveley services near Newbury, Berkshire.

When they arrived, Figard tried to phone Jean-Marc to ask him to pick her up, but misdialed. She was offered a lift to Salisbury by the driver of a white Mercedes lorry. Bouvier had reservations about the driver, but let her go with him nonetheless. Figard left the service station with the driver at around 4:30 pm. She never arrived at her destination, and was reported missing.

Police appealed for information about her disappearance, and issued a photofit of the lorry driver, but he was not identified. By 25 December, investigators were working on the theory that he had abducted her. The following day, investigators were working on the assumption she had been murdered. Figard's father travelled to the UK to help detectives in their search for her and to appeal to the public for information as to her whereabouts.

== Discovery of body and post mortem ==
On the morning of Friday, 29 December, the naked body of a young woman was found dumped at a lay-by on the A449 near the Worcestershire village of Hawford by a motorist who had stopped to change a windscreen wiper. Police sought to establish her identity, but were sure it was not that of Louise Smith, an 18-year-old clerical assistant who had vanished early on Christmas Day after attending a nightclub at Yate, Gloucestershire. Smith's body was discovered in February 1996 in Chipping Sodbury, South Gloucestershire.

The body was positively identified as that of Figard the following day. The post mortem determined she had been strangled and bludgeoned with a heavy implement, but did not establish which was fatal. The post mortem revealed "no obvious signs" of sexual assault, but it was determined that sexual intercourse had taken place shortly before her death, and detectives believed it had occurred against her will. Police said that the body had been lying where it was found for about twenty-four hours and were working on the theory that she had been held captive before being killed. Detective Chief Superintendent Roger Hoddinott of Hampshire Police said at the time of discovery, Figard had been dead for at least four to five days, but did not announce a time of death.

== Investigation ==
The investigation was led by DCS John McCammont of West Mercia Police, and involved more than 100 detectives from three police forces. Officers examined similar unsolved murders amid concerns that they could all be the work of the same individual. McCammont ruled out a link at a press conference on 4 January: "I would stress that at this stage there is no firm evidence whatsoever to link Céline's murder with any other investigations." He appealed for information concerning a bottle of Pascal Chrêtien champagne, a gift given to Figard before she came to England: "This particular type of champagne is not exported to anywhere in the world outside France and is not sold in this country. It is a 1993 vintage and only 60,000 bottles have been produced."

On 12 January 1996, investigators announced that they would perform DNA testing on the drivers of all vehicles similar to the Mercedes. This was the first time the method was used nationally to identify a murder suspect. Detectives traced more than 1,000 vehicles and tested 5,000 drivers. On 19 February, West Mercia Police confirmed that a man had been arrested and was helping them with their inquiries. The following day, authorities announced that the suspect was English and had been arrested in Poole, Dorset in a joint operation between West Mercia and Dorset Police. He was subsequently identified as Stuart Morgan, a 36-year-old self-employed lorry driver, who on 21 February was remanded following an appearance at Redditch magistrates.

== Stuart Morgan ==
Stuart Morgan
- Born: Stuart William Morgan; 1959 or 1960 (age 66–67)
- Occupation: Lorry driver
- Status: In prison
- Conviction: Murder
- Criminal charges: Murder
- Penalty: Life imprisonment

Details
- Imprisoned at: HM Prison Frankland

Stuart William Morgan is an English lorry driver and former heating engineer from Poole. One of five children of John and Julianne Morgan, he was raised in Tunbridge Wells, Kent, where his father was employed as a council foreman and his mother – a refugee from the former East Germany – worked as a school cleaner. Morgan left school with three CSEs, and in 1974 served a custodial sentence in borstal following a conviction for burglary. After attending Croydon Polytechnic to train as a plumber and heating engineer, he established a plumbing business in the Tunbridge Wells area. He moved to Dorset following the failure of that business in 1983 and worked as a heating engineer for Bournemouth Borough Council. He became a lorry driver in 1991.

Morgan was driving from Leeds to Southampton Docks when he picked up Figard on 19 December 1995. Detectives concluded that after raping and killing her, Morgan left her body in the bottom bunk of his cab for up to ten days while he continued to drive the lorry, driving and sleeping in it for at least some of that time, before disposing of the body on 29 December. He was arrested in February 1996 after another lorry driver recognised him from a photofit. Morgan initially denied meeting her, but after he was picked out at an identity parade, he claimed he and Figard had met and engaged in consensual sex.

== Trial ==
The trial began at Worcester Crown Court on 2 October 1996, before Mr Justice Latham and a jury. Morgan's trial counsel was Nigel Jones QC, and the case was prosecuted by David Farrer QC. Morgan denied the charge.

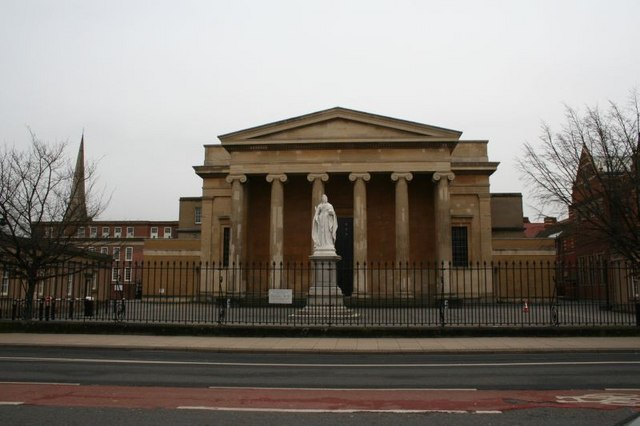
Morgan's trial was held at Worcester Crown Court in October 1996.

Evidence was presented by the prosecution to suggest that Morgan continued to use the vehicle while Figard's body lay in the cab, and that the lorry was parked outside his house over the Christmas period. Farrer said Morgan bought a spade, axe and hacksaw with the intention of dismembering the body, but changed his mind, instead making an overnight delivery run to dispose of it. After removing a fuse from his lorry's tachograph to conceal the journey, he drove to Worcestershire. Discrepancies were subsequently found in his travel records for 29 December 1995 because he forgot to replace the fuse following the trip. Several items belonging to Figard, including photographs and a toilet bag, were recovered from his house.

Morgan admitted giving Figard a lift on the afternoon of 19 December 1995, and that she was "smiling and happy". He did not come forward after police appealed for details of the driver who had given her a lift because he did not want his wife to learn of his infidelity. He claimed her photographs and other belongings were in his possession because she had left them in his truck, and the mattress had become stained with blood because a man had lain on it after gashing his leg while the vehicle was on loan to another driver in 1994.

On 16 October, a jury took three and a half hours to convict Morgan of Figard's murder, and he was sentenced to life imprisonment with a recommendation that the Home Secretary should decide his parole eligibility. Passing sentence, Mr Justice Latham said, "What you did to Céline has caused revulsion in the minds of all right-thinking people. You are a dangerous man and I will so report to the Home Secretary." Latham subsequently set a minimum term of twenty years, which was later endorsed by the Lord Chief Justice of England and Wales, Lord Bingham, and on 4 November 1998, the Home Secretary (Jack Straw) informed Morgan of the length of the sentence he must serve.

== Appeals ==
Morgan appealed his conviction on the grounds that it was unfair due to the level of publicity the case had received. His application was rejected by the Court of Appeal of England and Wales on 5 February 1998 after the three sitting judges ruled there were insufficient grounds to justify an appeal.

In January 2009, Morgan appealed again under paragraph 3 of Schedule 22 of the Criminal Justice Act 2003 to the High Court of England and Wales requesting a review of the minimum term recommendation. This too was rejected, in July of that year, with the presiding judge, Mr Justice Openshaw recommending, "The sentence is – and remains – a sentence of imprisonment for life. The defendant may not even be considered for release until he has served at least 20 years (less the time served before sentence). That is not to say that he will then be released; indeed he will be detained unless and until the Parole Board is satisfied that he no longer presents a risk to the public. Even if the Parole Board decides then or at some time in the future to authorise his release, he will be upon licence which will extend for the rest of his life."

In January 2016, Morgan appealed against the Ministry of Justice after it decided not to downgrade his prisoner status from that of a Category A prisoner, as well as challenging the Parole Board for refusing to allow him an oral hearing. A hearing at the High Court on 26 January was told that under the terms of his sentence, Morgan would be eligible for parole from February, but had continued to maintain his innocence throughout his time in prison, claiming to be in a "Catch-22" situation where he could not qualify for release without admitting his guilt. Rejecting Morgan's case, Justice William Davis suggested that Morgan had not "addressed his offending behaviour" and was "in effect in the same position as in December 1995, when he murdered his victim".

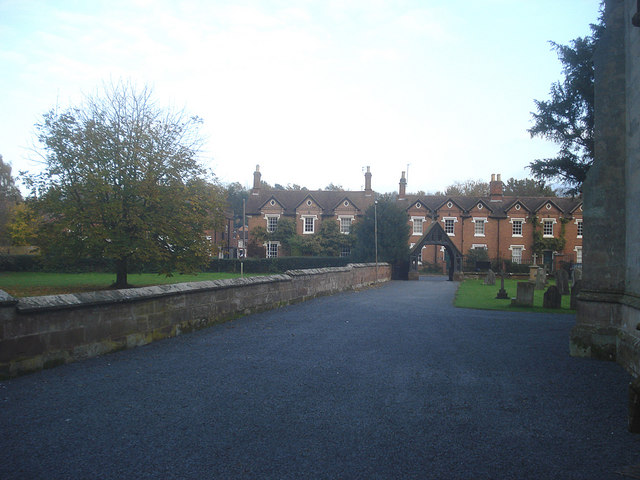
The entrance to St Andrew's Church in Ombersley, Worcestershire, where services are held in Figard's memory

In June 2022, the French newspaper L'Est Républicain reported that Morgan was still imprisoned and had seen another application for release rejected earlier in the year. In the 2022 Sky Crime documentary on the case, residents who lived near to Morgan at the time also said that he is still imprisoned. He is imprisoned at HM Prison Frankland.

== Aftermath and memorials ==
Figard's body was flown home to France on 17 January 1996, where her funeral was held on 20 January. She was buried in Scey-sur-Saône-et-Saint-Albin.

A memorial garden dedicated to Figard was planted at St Andrew's Church in the village of Ombersley, Worcestershire, close to where her body was found, and opened at a ceremony in June 1997. The garden also remembers other victims of violent crime, including Joanna Parrish and Caroline Dickinson, two English students who were murdered in France. On 29 December 2000, the fifth anniversary of the date Figard's body was recovered, the local newspaper, the Worcester News reported that an annual service of remembrance was held for her at the church during the autumn, attended by her parents. Flowers were also regularly placed at the lay-by at Hawford where she was found, and the location named Le Jardin de Céline (Céline's Garden) in her memory.

== 2022 documentary ==
In 2022, a Sky Crime documentary on the case was aired. It was part of the Murdered at First Sight series.

== See also ==
- Lists of solved missing person cases
- John Cannan, another infamous British murderer (and suspected killer of Suzy Lamplugh) who died in Full Sutton Prison on 6 November 2024 at the age of 70.
- Murder of Marie Wilks, another unsolved UK murder of a woman who was abducted from a motorway and dumped nearby
- Murder of Melanie Hall, unsolved UK murder of a woman whose remains were found dumped by the M5 motorway
- Murders of Jacqueline Ansell-Lamb and Barbara Mayo, two unsolved murder cases (believed to be linked) of women who were abducted on UK motorways and dumped nearby

Unsolved UK cases where the offender's DNA is likewise known:

- Murder of Deborah Linsley
- Murders of Eve Stratford and Lynne Weedon
- Murder of Lindsay Rimer
- Murder of Lyn Bryant
- Murder of Janet Brown
- Murder of Linda Cook
- Batman rapist, subject to Britain's longest-running serial rape investigation
