= Dodderhill =

Civil parish in Worcestershire, England

Coordinates: 52.28365°N 2.124867°W

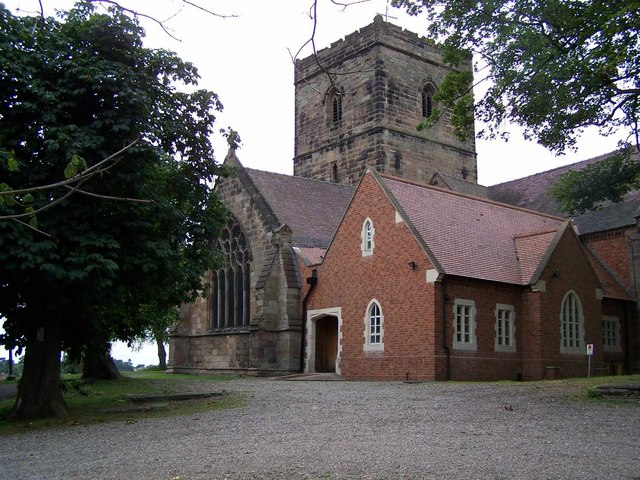
- St. Augustine's parish church

- Location within Worcestershire
- Population: 2,626 (2021)
- OS grid reference: SO901637
- Civil parish: Dodderhill
- District: Wychavon
- Shire county: Worcestershire
- Region: West Midlands
- Country: England
- Sovereign state: United Kingdom
- Post town: Droitwich
- Postcode district: WR9
- UK Parliament: Mid Worcestershire

Dodderhill is a civil parish, near Droitwich, Worcestershire, England, located on the River Salwarpe. The parish is bisected by the M5 motorway, constructed in 1962. It is home to the Droitwich transmitting station in Wychbold. In 2021, the parish had a population of 2,626.

== History ==
The name Dodderhill derives from the Old English Dudrahyll meaning 'Dudra's hill'.

One of the earliest mentions of Dodderhill is of the Saxon Royal Palace recorded in the Saxon Charter of AD 692. There was once a Roman fort and later an Anglo-Saxon church. The parish church of St. Augustine's, is on the hill overlooking Droitwich Spa. It was completed in 1220 and rebuilt in the 18th century. A possible ley tunnel is said by archeologists to lead from St Augustine's, to Friar Street Droitwich Spa, part of a system of tunnels linking St Augustine's and St Andrew's churches. (This 'tunnel' seems unlikely as it does not appear to have been located or mentioned when the railway and/or canal was built unless built after this time).

Notable people associated with Dodderhill include the MP Thomas Vernon, part of whose family estate was located in the parish; the royalist Sir Thomas Nott, who bought the manors of Sagebury and Obden in Dodderhill in 1637; and the 'Salt King' and philanthropist John Corbett who built the Chateau Impney in 1873.

== Schools ==
There is one school associated with the area which is known as RGS Dodderhill. This is a private (fee paying) school for pupils from age 2 to 16 years. The senior school is housed in the old vicarage of the church shown above. As of 2022 there are around 150 pupils.
