= Martin Hussingtree =

Village in Worcestershire, England

Coordinates: 52.239611°N 2.17318°W

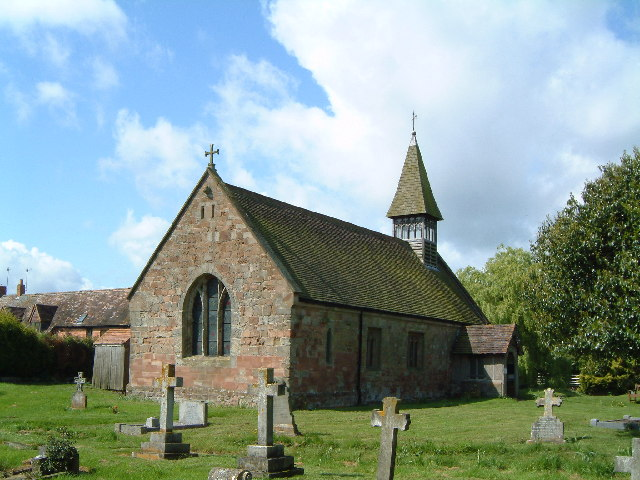
- St Michael & All Angels, Martin Hussingtree

- Location within Worcestershire
- Population: 272
- OS grid reference: SO882601
- District: Wychavon
- Shire county: Worcestershire
- Region: West Midlands
- Country: England
- Sovereign state: United Kingdom
- Post town: WORCESTER
- Postcode district: WR3
- Dialling code: 01905
- Police: West Mercia
- Fire: Hereford and Worcester
- Ambulance: West Midlands

Martin Hussingtree is a small village situated between Droitwich Spa and Worcester in the county of Worcestershire, England. It is north of another village called Fernhill Heath. It is situated on a junction of the A38 and A4538. A public house called The Swan is located just north of the junction. The civil parish population was 272 in 2021.

Its name derives from two separate manors: Meretun (meaning farmstead by the boundary) and Husan Treo (boundary tree of lands belonging to Husa, a personal name).

The village is within the area of the Hindlip, Martin Hussingtree and Salwarpe parish council.

The churchyard of the Church of St Michael and All Angels contains the grave of Thomas Tomkins, a composer of sacred music in the time of Queen Elizabeth I and King James I. He was a relative by marriage of the Folliott family, who were Lords of the Manor of Martin Hussingtree for generations. His work "Galliard-the Lady Folliott's" was written in honour of his daughter-in-law, Isabella Folliott.
