= Droitwich Canals Trust =

The Droitwich Canals Trust is an English limited company created in 1973 to work towards the restoration of the Droitwich Canal. From 2001 it worked as part of a larger group, the Droitwich Canals Restoration Partnership, and in 2004, following a successful application for a grant of £4.6 million from the Heritage Lottery Fund surrendered its lease on the canal to British Waterways, who then managed the restoration through to the reopening of the canals in 2011.

== History ==
The Droitwich Canals, consisting of the Barge Canal from Droitwich to the River Severn at Hawford and the Junction Canal from Droitwich to the Worcester and Birmingham Canal at Hanbury, were abandoned in 1939. During the early 1960s, the condition of the remains was regularly debated by Droitwich Borough Council, and various plans for its long-term future were suggested. In 1959 Max Sinclair began campaigning to reopen the Droitwich Canals and on 4 November 2013 was honored with the Freedom of the town for his services to Droitwich. A local member of the Inland Waterways Association started a press campaign in 1963, suggesting that restoration was feasible. At the time, Max Sinclair estimated that the work could be completed in less than two years. By 1966, the council were beginning to think of the canal in terms of an amenity, and floated the idea of its restoration to the general public through an illustrated article, which appeared in the Worcester Evening News on 14 June 1966.

In 1969, the Inland Waterways Association published a strategy document entitled Safeguarding Britain's Waterways, in which each of its eight branches were asked to work with local restoration groups. Where there was no such group, interest was created in forming one, and a group was set up for the Worcester and Birmingham Canal and the Droitwich Canals. As progress was made towards the start of actual restoration, a more formal structure was needed, and the Droitwich Canals Trust Ltd was established in 1973, with support from local councils. Work began on the canal soon afterwards. The Trust is a private company limited by guarantee with no share capital, and is registered with Companies House as Company No. 01132669.

Progress was slow, but the first section near Vines Park was reopened in October 1986. In 1994, a feasibility study on full restoration was presented to a packed public meeting at Worcester Town Hall. It identified two major problems, that of an adequate water supply and the crossing of the A449 road just above the junction with the River Severn. While the local authorities were committed to restoration, it was dependent on the availability of financial resources. The Trust indicated that it had neither the manpower nor the resources to complete the restoration as quickly as some people desired.

From July 2001, the Trust worked as part of the Droitwich Canals Restoration Partnership. This consisted of representatives from the Trust and from British Waterways, The Waterways Trust, Worcestershire County Council and Wychavon District Council. Following the creation of the Heritage Lottery Fund, grants were available for projects which sought to preserve the country's heritage, and in late 2004, a grant of £4.6 million was secured to complete the restoration. Further matched funding came from local councils and from Advantage West Midlands, the regional development agency covering the locality. In order to create a better structure for the management of such a large capital project, the Trust surrendered their lease of the canal to British Waterways, who would then lead the project.

== See also ==
- Canals of the United Kingdom
- History of the British canal system

== Bibliography ==
- Cumberlidge, Jane (2009). Inland Waterways of Great Britain (8th Ed.). Imray Laurie Norie and Wilson. ISBN 978-1-84623-010-3.
- Squires, Roger (2008). Britain's restored canals. Landmark Publishing. ISBN 978-1-84306-331-5.
- Rowley, Margaret (2012). The Droitwich Canals:Navigation Guide and Visitor Guide (2nd ed.). Droitwich Waterways Trust c/o Old Park, Plough Road, Tibberton, Droitwich Spa WR9 7NN. ISBN 978-0-9568183-1-7.
