= RGS Dodderhill =

Coordinates: 52.2720°N 2.1454°W

Location
- Dodderhill Road; Droitwich Spa, Worcestershire, WR9 0BE; England

Information
- Type: Private day school
- Established: 1945
- Department for Education URN: 147783 Tables
- Headmaster: Tom Banyard
- Gender: Co-educational Nursery & Prep School - Girls only Senior School
- Age: 2 to 16
- Enrolment: 180
- Website: https://www.rgsw.org.uk/dodderhill/

RGS Dodderhill is an all girls private school on the outskirts of Droitwich Spa, Worcestershire, England. For girls aged 9-16, RGS Dodderhill offers a focused, academically ambitious environment designed around how girls lean, lead and communicate. Every girl is known, valued and driven to achieve her very best.

== History ==
Dodderhill School was founded in 1945 as the senior girls' school of Whitford Hall, a well-established prep school located in Bromsgrove. In 1999, Whitford Hall moved to the village of Dodderhill and was known as "Whitford Hall and Dodderhill School" until 2006. On 30 April 2019, Dodderhill School merged with the RGS Worcester family of schools, and is now known as RGS Dodderhill. In September 2021, RGS Dodderhill Prep School became co-educational, whilst the Senior School remains exclusively for Girls.

== Academics ==
RGS Dodderhill has a strong academic record despite its relatively small size compared to other independent schools in the area. The broad curriculum and preparation for GCSEs was commended in the 2017 ISI inspection reports.
