= Wychbold =

Village in Worcestershire, England

Coordinates: 52.292403°N 2.114811°W

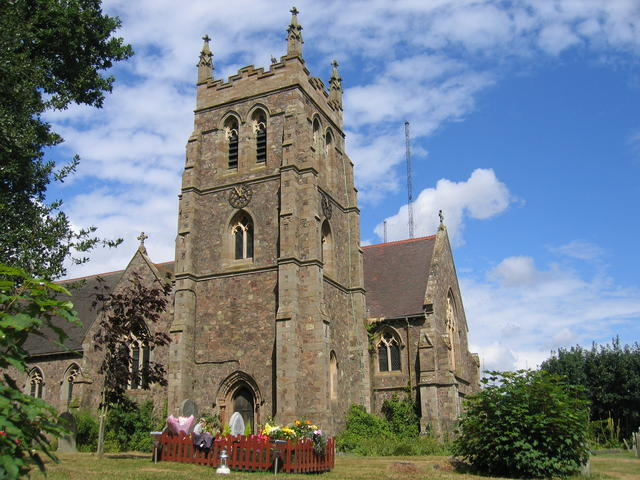
- Church of St Mary de Wyche

- Location within Worcestershire
- Population: 2,001 (2021 census)
- OS grid reference: SO922660
- Civil parish: Dodderhill
- District: Wychavon
- Shire county: Worcestershire
- Region: West Midlands
- Country: England
- Sovereign state: United Kingdom
- Post town: DROITWICH
- Postcode district: WR9
- Police: West Mercia
- Fire: Hereford and Worcester
- Ambulance: West Midlands
- UK Parliament: Redditch

Wychbold is a village in the Wychavon district of Worcestershire. The village is situated on the A38 between Droitwich Spa and Bromsgrove, and by Junction 5 of the M5 motorway. Its population was 2,001 in 2021.

The first records of Wychbold suggest that it was of great importance to the Anglo-Saxons, particularly in regards to its proximity to Droitwich Spa. The village is known primarily for the garden centre Webbs of Wychbold.

== Toponymy ==
The name Wychbold is derived from the Old English wīc–bold, meaning "Dwelling near the trading settlement". It has been recorded as Uuicbold (692) and Wicelbold (1086, Domesday Book). The "wych" element ("near the trading settlement") is likely to refer to Droitwich.

== History ==
=== Iron Age to Roman times ===
Evidence has been found of human settlement in Wychbold from the Iron Age and Roman times.

Various pits, ditches and postholes have been found in sites throughout the village, indicating the presence of roundhouses and a permanent Iron Age settlement. Archaeologists have also found various significant items from the Iron Age, such as broken vessels and a salt container from the Malvern Hills and Droitwich Spa. The presence of pottery from Malvern suggests that Wychbold had strong trade links outside of its immediate area, even in the Iron Age.

Wychbold is located on an old Roman road and salt road, now the A38. Romans are believed to have settled in the Wychbold area between the 1st and 4th century, shown by the presence of Severn Valley and samian pottery.

=== Middle Ages to Early modern period ===
The earliest known record of Wychbold is in a charter of 692 (where it is known as Uuicbold), describing how Æthelred of Mercia "granted ten hides of land there to his thegn Oslaf". The charter is generally considered to be fabricated, but describes the village as being "distinguished", suggesting that the village belonged to royalty at the time. The next known record of Wychbold is in a charter issued by Coenwulf of Mercia in 815. In this, and a later charter issued by Wiglaf of Mercia in 831, Wychbold is referred to as a royal vill, suggesting its importance as a royal base or even residence. Documents point to the existence of the Anglo–Saxon estate within Wychbold, but its location is currently unknown.

During the 11th century, possession of Wychbold passed from Earl Godwine to Osbern fitzRichard, who held it at the time of the Domesday Book. There were 11 hides (4 of which were exempt from tax), 5 mills and 26 salt–pans in the village. The population was around 50 people.

In 1204, William de Cantilupe, Sheriff of Worcestershire and steward to King John, came into possession of properties within the village.

During the Middle Ages, a manor house was built in Wychbold, north of Church Lane. Now known as Wychbold Court, the current timber-frame house dates back to the 16th or 17th century. Minor alterations have been made to the house, during the 19th and 20th centuries. Excavation near the Grade II listed house revealed pottery dating to the 13th or 14th century and evidence of farming in the area at the time.

There also once stood a manor house called Wychbold Hall within the village, the residence of the Amphlett family, described as being "modern" in 1911. It was in "perfect preservation" when it stood. The stone-flagged floor of the house was moved to Greyfriars, Worcester.

=== 20th Century ===
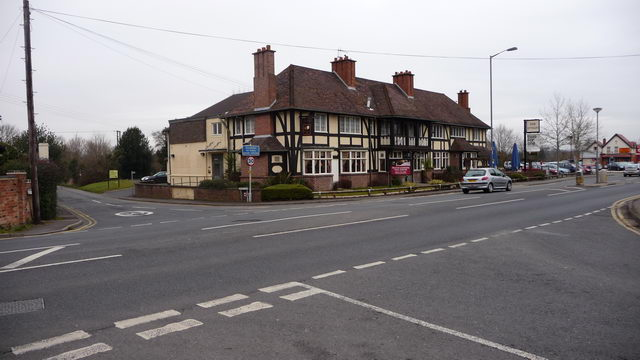
The Crown Inn, site of Wychbold Home Guard during the Second World War

During the Second World War, communal air raid shelters were built on either end of Wychbold, along with a concrete blast shelter near the main road. The village's Home Guard worked out of the Crown Inn.

== Governance ==
Wychbold is primarily governed by Dodderhill Parish Council, which performs maintenance on the village's public areas. It is then governed by Wychavon District Council. It falls within the Redditch constituency, being represented in Parliament by Chris Bloore.

Wychbold falls under Ombersley division within Worcestershire County Council and is represented by Peter Tomlinson.

== Geography and demography ==
Wychbold is located between the towns of Droitwich Spa and Bromsgrove. The River Salwarpe runs around the outside of the village.

Nearby villages include Upton Warren and Stoke Prior to the north-east, and Rashwood to the south-west.

The Droitwich transmitting station is located just outside the village, near Upton Warren.

At the 2021 UK census, Wychbold had a population of 2,001. The White ethnic group made up 93.5% of the population, whilst Christianity was the largest religion, at 54%.

In recent years, Wychbold has seen the development of multiple housing estates, such as the Elmbridge Gardens site built in 2014. The increase in population put pressure on the village's school, with rising demand for admissions places forcing the school to expand. Plans for further housing developments have been criticised, citing pressures on local infrastructure.

== Economy ==
Wychbold has several restaurants and pubs, including a Harvester and a McDonald's. Holiday Inn runs a hotel within the village, next to the motorway junction. There are also multiple petrol stations within the village, along the A38.

Webbs of Wychbold, a garden centre, is located just outside of Wychbold, and hires large numbers of staff from the local area. It is known for the number of events it puts on throughout the year, such as their Christmas ice rink, which bring visitors to the village. There is also a Hobbycraft and Cotswold Outdoor within the garden centre.

== Transport ==
The A38 runs through Wychbold, connecting it to Droitwich Spa and Bromsgrove. The village is by Junction 5 of the M5 motorway, allowing easy travel to Worcester and Birmingham.

In May 1966, in Nottingham, a new 54-mile motorway was proposed from the M5 at Rashwood, around the south of Birmingham, to the M1 near Nottingham, at Lockington, Leicestershire. The subsequent M42 motorway would reach Lockington, as the A42, but the M42 junction with the M5 was moved further north.

Wychbold main bus service is the 144, run by FirstGroup and goes between Worcester and Birmingham. In addition Diamond Bus operate service 145/145A between Rubery and Droitwich via Bromsgrove.

Both Droitwich Spa and Bromsgrove have train stations, providing services to Hereford and Birmingham.

== Places of worship ==
Wychbold's parish church is the church of St Mary de Wyche, located within the Anglican Diocese of Worcester. The Grade II* listed church was built between 1888 and 1889, funded by the Amphlett family and John Corbett, an industrialist and the local Member of Parliament. The southeast tower contains an original late 13th century doorway.

The hymn 'In the Cross of Christ I Glory', has a tune written by Walter Whinfield (1865-1919) called 'Wychbold'. Walter Whinfield was the curate at nearby St John's church, Bromsgrove, and paid for the building in 1907/8 of the church of Holy Trinity & St Mary at the Chartist village of Dodford, Worcestershire.

There also stood a Congregational church within the village, dating from 1836.

== Services and education ==
Wychbold's surgery on De Wyche Road is run as a branch by St Johns Surgery as part of NHS Redditch and Bromsgrove. The village's closest A&E is Worcestershire Royal Hospital, although there are non-urgent hospitals within Droitwich Spa and Bromsgrove.

Other emergency services are provided by West Mercia Police and Hereford and Worcester Fire and Rescue Service, both having stations in Droitwich Spa.

Wychbold's only school is Wychbold First and Nursery School, which opened in September 1972. It teaches children from the age of 3–10.

== Leisure and sport ==
In August 2018, a new play area opened opposite Wychbold Village Hall, containing new swings, climbing frames and slides. The play area will be improved further in the future, adding a small games area for table tennis and boules. The village hall also maintains football pitches, with access to changing rooms and a car park.

Wychbold also has a rural walk site called Centurion Way Woods.

After the sudden closure of the village's social club in April 2017, Wychbold's villagers raised over £20,000 to reopen the club. The Wychbold Sports and Social Club reopened in July 2017, with the aim to "bring the community together amidst several new housing developments" within the village. It offers a large lounge and function room, small bar and a snooker room.

Wychbold is represented in Sunday league football by Wychbold FC, who have played on the pitches outside the village hall for over 50 years.

== Notable people ==
- George Lashwood (1863–1942), English music hall singer, buried at St Mary de Wyche
