= Thomas Tomkins =

Welsh composer (1572–1656)

A Sad Paven for These Distracted Tymes (1649)
Performed by Phillip W. Serna, Treble, Tenor & Bass Viols

Thomas Tomkins (1572 – 9 June 1656) was a Welsh-born composer of the late Tudor and early Stuart period. In addition to being one of the prominent members of the English Madrigal School, he was a skilled composer of keyboard and consort music, and the last member of the English virginalist school.

== Life ==
Tomkins was born in St David's in Pembrokeshire in 1572. His father, also Thomas, who had moved there in 1565 from the family home of Lostwithiel in Cornwall, was a vicar choral of St David's Cathedral and organist there. Three of Thomas junior's half-brothers, John, Giles and Robert, also became eminent musicians, but none quite attained the fame of Thomas. By 1594, but possibly as early as 1586, Thomas and his family had moved to Gloucester, where his father was employed as a minor canon at the cathedral. Thomas almost certainly studied under William Byrd for a time, for one of his songs bears the inscription: To my ancient, and much reverenced Master, William Byrd, and it may have been at this period of his career, since Byrd leased property at Longney, near Gloucester. Although documentary proof is lacking, it is also possible that Byrd was instrumental in finding young Thomas a place as chorister in the Chapel Royal. In any case, all former Chapel Royal choristers were required to be found a place at university, and in 1607 Tomkins was admitted to the degree of B.Mus. as a member of Magdalen College, Oxford.

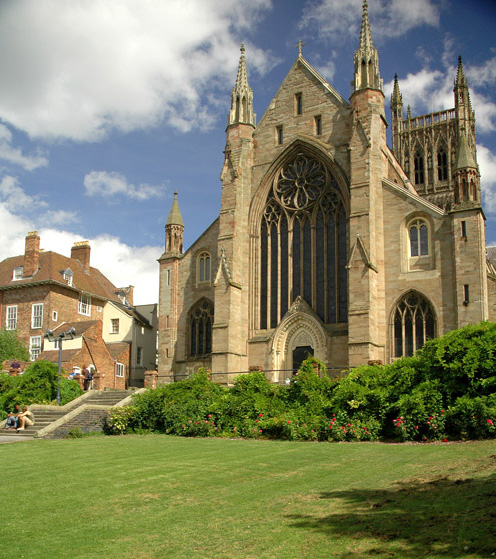
Worcester Cathedral

But already in 1596 he had been appointed Organist at Worcester Cathedral. The next year, he married Alice Patrick, a widow nine years his senior, whose husband Nathaniel, who died in 1595, had been Tomkins' predecessor at Worcester. Thomas's only son, Nathaniel, was born in Worcester in 1599, where he was to spend the rest of his life and become a respected musician.

Tomkins was acquainted with Thomas Morley, also a pupil of Byrd's, for his signed copy of Morley's publication Plaine and Easie Introduction to Practicall Musicke (1597) has been preserved, together with Tomkins' many annotations; and in 1601 Morley included one of Tomkins' madrigals in his important collection The Triumphs of Oriana.

In 1612, Tomkins oversaw the construction in Worcester cathedral of a magnificent new organ by Thomas Dallam, the foremost organ-builder of the day. He continued writing verse anthems, and his collection of 28 madrigals, the Songs of 3, 4, 5 and 6 parts was finally published in 1622 with a dedicatory poem by his half-brother John Tomkins (circa 1587–1638), now organist of King's College, Cambridge (later of St Paul's and of the Chapel Royal), with whom Thomas maintained an intimate and loving relationship.

Probably by about 1603, Thomas was appointed a Gentleman Extraordinary of the Chapel Royal. This was an honorary post, but in 1621 he became a Gentleman Ordinary and organist under his friend and senior organist, Orlando Gibbons. The duties connected with this post included regular journeys between Worcester and London, which Tomkins performed until about 1639.

On James I's death in March 1625 Tomkins, with other Gentlemen of the Chapel Royal, was required to attend to both the music for James's funeral and that for the coronation of Charles I. These monumental tasks proved too much for Gibbons, who died of a stroke in Canterbury, where Charles was supposed to meet his future bride, Henrietta Maria of France, placing an even greater strain on Tomkins. Because of plague, the coronation was luckily postponed until February 1626, giving Tomkins time to compose most of the eight anthems sung at the ceremony.

In 1628, Tomkins was named "Composer of [the King's] Music in ordinary" at an annual salary of £40, succeeding Alfonso Ferrabosco the younger who died in March that year. But this prestigious post, the highest honour available to an English musician, was quickly revoked on the grounds that it had been promised to Ferrabosco's son. This shabby treatment was to be only the first of a series of adversities that overtook the composer for the last fourteen years of his life. He continued, however, to perform his dual duties at Worcester and London until 1639.

Tomkins' devoted wife Alice died in 1642, the year civil war broke out. Worcester was one of the first casualties: the cathedral was desecrated, and Tomkins' organ badly damaged by the Parliamentarians. The following year, Tomkins' house near the cathedral suffered a direct hit by cannon shot, making it uninhabitable for a long period, and destroying most of his household goods and probably a number of his musical manuscripts. About this time Tomkins married his second wife Martha Browne, widow of a Worcester Cathedral lay clerk.

Further conflict and a siege in 1646 caused untold damage to the city. With the choir disbanded and the cathedral closed, Tomkins turned his genius to the composition of some of his finest keyboard and consort music; in 1647, he wrote a belated tombeau or tribute to Thomas Wentworth, 1st Earl of Strafford, and a further one to the memory of William Laud, Archbishop of Canterbury, both of them beheaded in the 1640s, and both admired by Tomkins. Charles I was executed in 1649, and a few days later Tomkins, always a royalist, composed his superb Sad Pavan: for these distracted times. His second wife Martha died around 1653, and deprived of his living, Tomkins, now 81, was in serious financial difficulties. In 1654, his son Nathaniel married Isabella Folliott, a wealthy widow, and Thomas went to live with them in Martin Hussingtree, some four miles from Worcester. He expressed his gratitude by composing his Galliard, The Lady Folliot's in her honour. Two years later he died and was buried in the churchyard of the Church of St Michael and All Angels in Martin Hussingtree on 9 June 1656.

== Works ==
Tomkins wrote and published madrigals—amongst which The Fauns and Satyrs Tripping, included in Morley's The Triumphs of Oriana (1601); Songs of 3,4,5 and 6 parts (1622); 76 pieces of keyboard (organ, virginal, harpsichord) music, consort music, anthems, and liturgical music. Stylistically he was extremely conservative, even anachronistic: he seems to have completely ignored the rising Baroque practice around him, with its Italian-inspired idioms, and he also avoided writing in most of the popular forms of the time, such as the lute song, or ayre. His polyphonic language, even in the fourth decade of the 17th century, was frankly that of the Renaissance. Some of his madrigals are extremely expressive, with text-painting and chromaticism worthy of Italian madrigalists such as Marenzio or Luzzaschi.

He was also a prolific composer of both full and verse anthems, writing more than almost any other English composer of the 17th century—surpassed (putatively) only by William Child—and several of his works for the church were contemporaneously copied for use elsewhere. The survival of his music was ensured by the posthumous publication, overseen by his son Nathaniel, of Musica Deo Sacra et Ecclesiae Anglicanae; or Music dedicated to the Honor and Service of God, and to the Use of Cathedral and other Churches of England (William Godbid, London: 1668); Musica Deo Sacra contains five services, five psalm tunes, the Preces and two proper psalms, and ninety-four anthems, and was published as a five-volume set—one volume each for Medius; Contratenor; Tenor; Bassus, and the Pars Organica.

== Sources ==
- Stephen D. Tuttle: Thomas Tomkins: Keyboard Music. Stainer & Bell, London 1973.
- Anthony Boden: Thomas Tomkins: The Last Elizabethan. Ashgate Publishing 2005. ISBN 0-7546-5118-5
- John Irving: The Instrumental Music of Thomas Tomkins, 1572–1656. Garland Publishing, New York 1989. ISBN 0-8240-2011-1
- Thomas Tomkins – Pièces pour Virginal, 1646–1654. Introduction de François Lesure. Fac-similé du ms. autographe de la Bibliothèque Nationale, Paris, Rés. 1122. Minkoff, Geneva 1982.
- Article "Thomas Tomkins," in The New Grove Dictionary of Music and Musicians, ed. Stanley Sadie. 20 vol. London, Macmillan Publishers Ltd., 1980. ISBN 1-56159-174-2
- The Concise Edition of Baker's Biographical Dictionary of Musicians, 8th ed. Revised by Nicolas Slonimsky. New York, Schirmer Books, 1993. ISBN 0-02-872416-X
