= Church of St Michael and All Angels, Martin Hussingtree =

Church in Worcestershire, England

Church of St Michael and All Angels
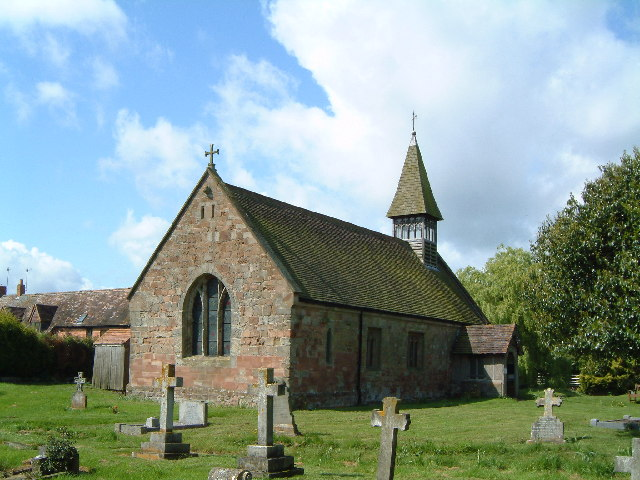
- Church of St Michael and All Angels
- 52.2365°N 2.1819°W
- Denomination: Church of England

History
- Dedication: St Michael and All Angels

Architecture
- Functional status: Parish church
- Heritage designation: Grade I
- Designated: 14 March 1969
- Architectural type: Church

Administration
- Diocese: Worcester
- Archdeaconry: Dudley
- Parish: Salwarpe and Hindlip with Martin Hussingtree

The Church of St Michael and All Angels is a Grade I listed church in Martin Hussingtree, Worcestershire.

The west wall is probably of 12th century origin, but the remainder of the church was rebuilt in the early 13th century.

Thomas Tomkins was buried in the churchyard on 9 June 1656.
