= Scey-sur-Saône-et-Saint-Albin =

- Commune
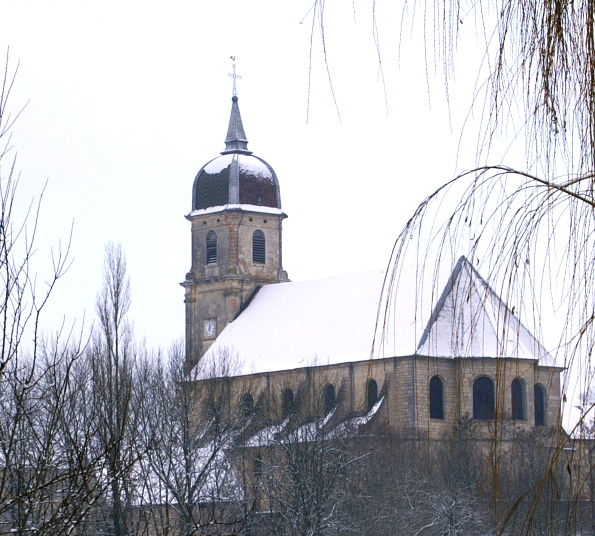
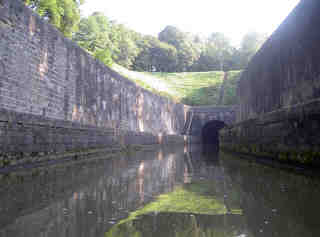
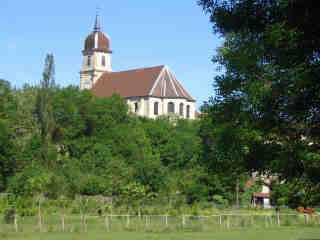
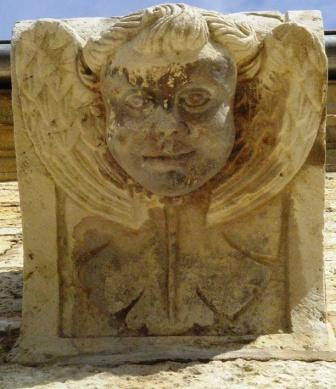
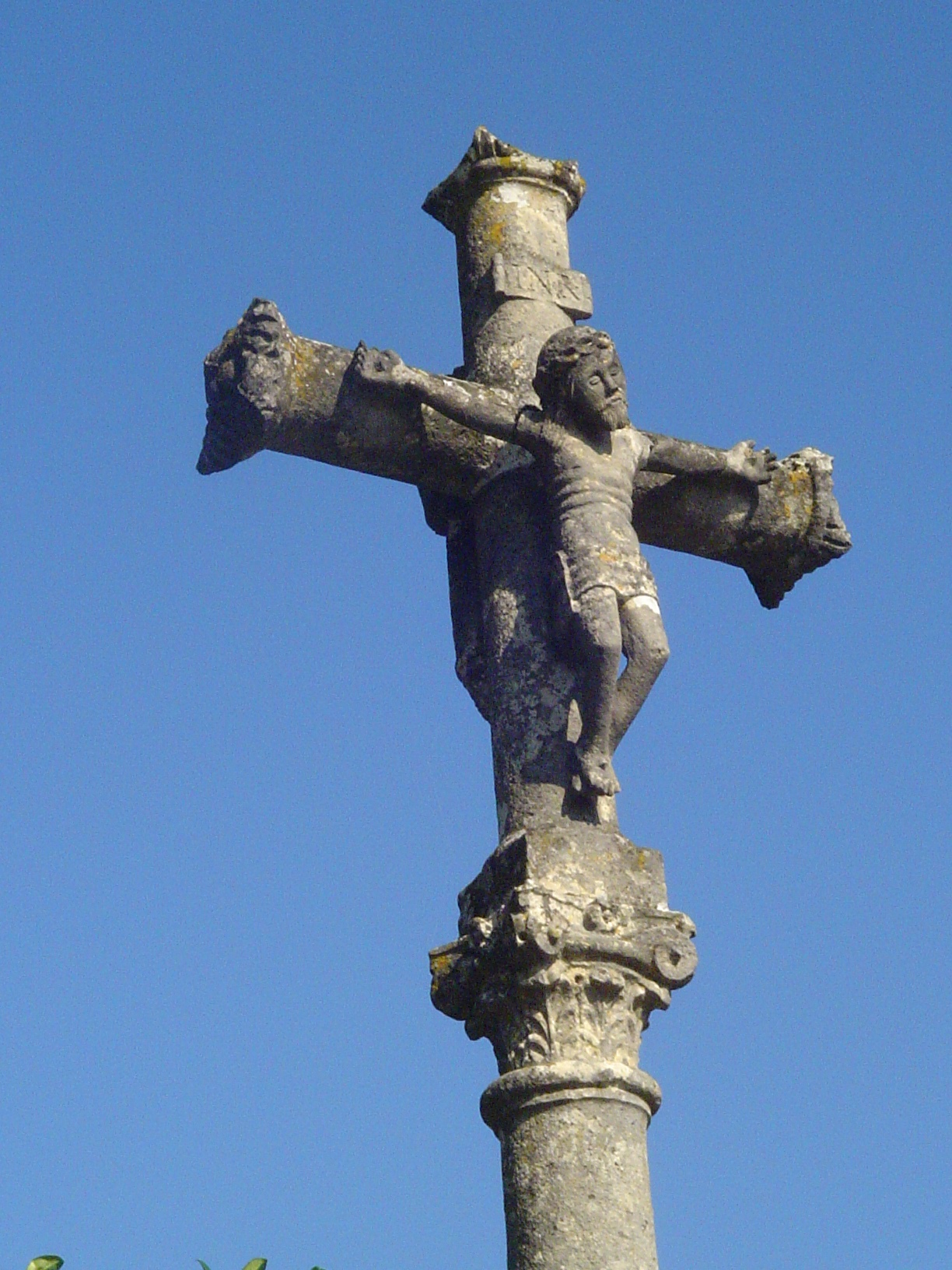
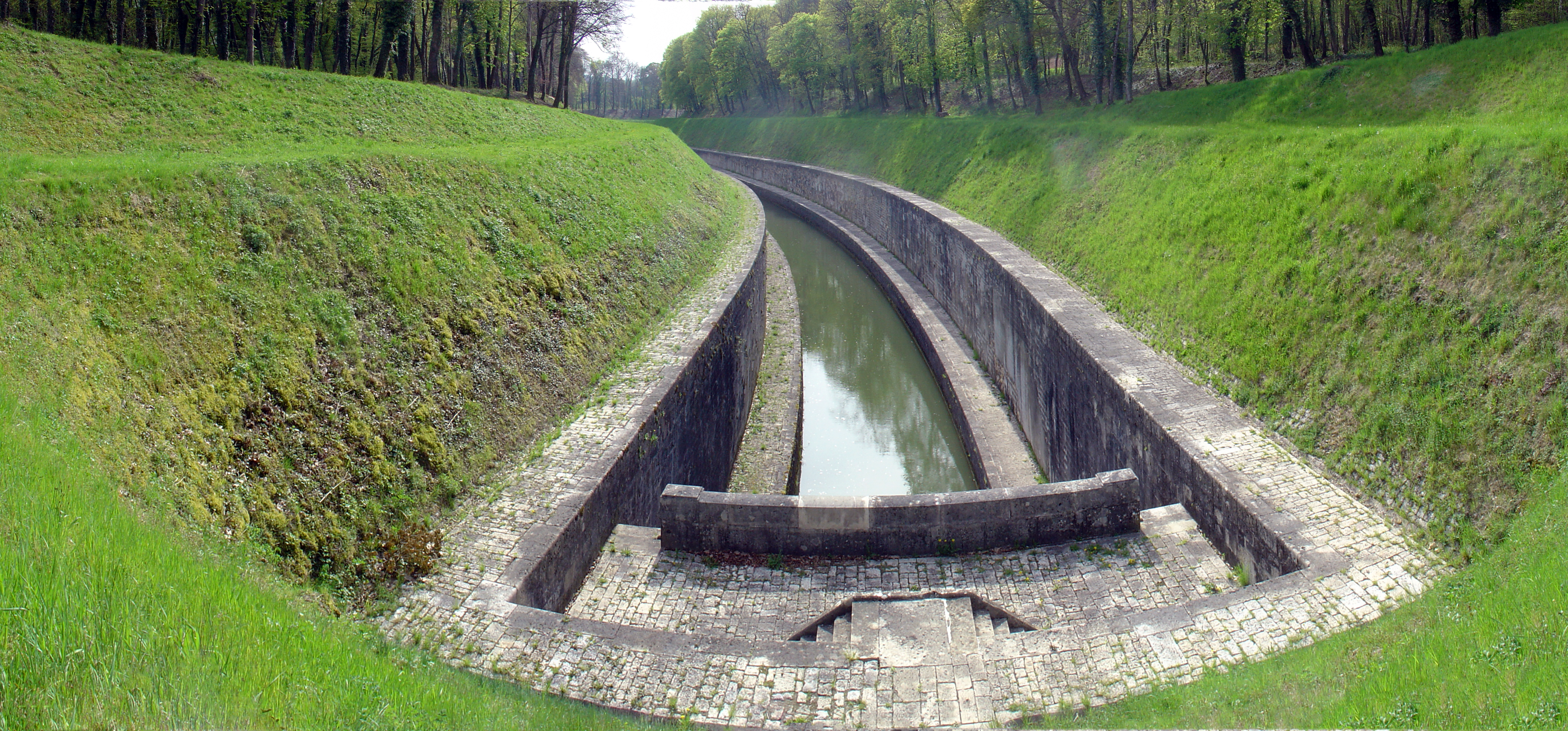
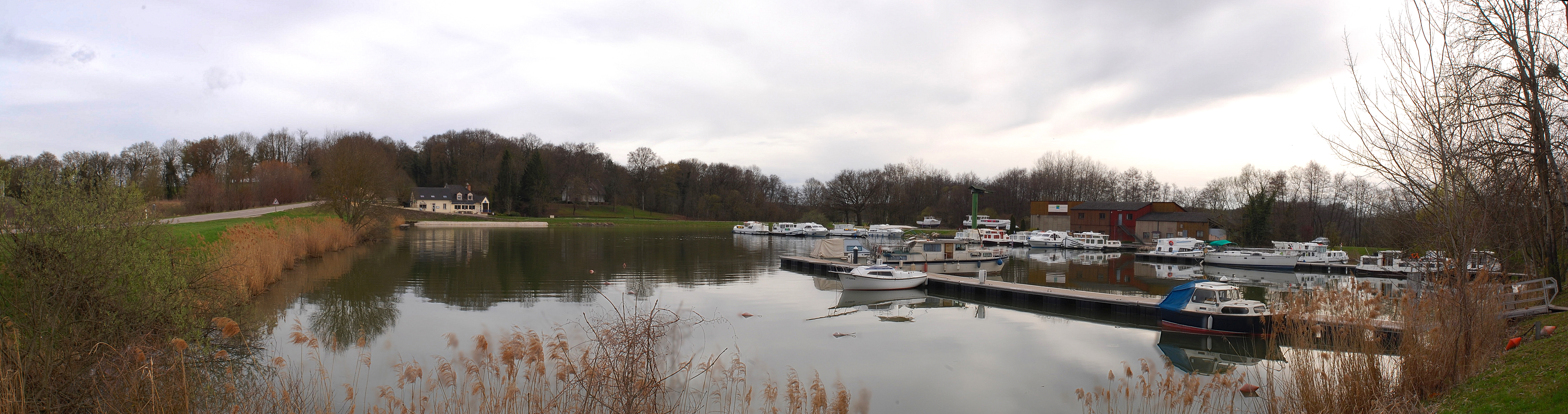
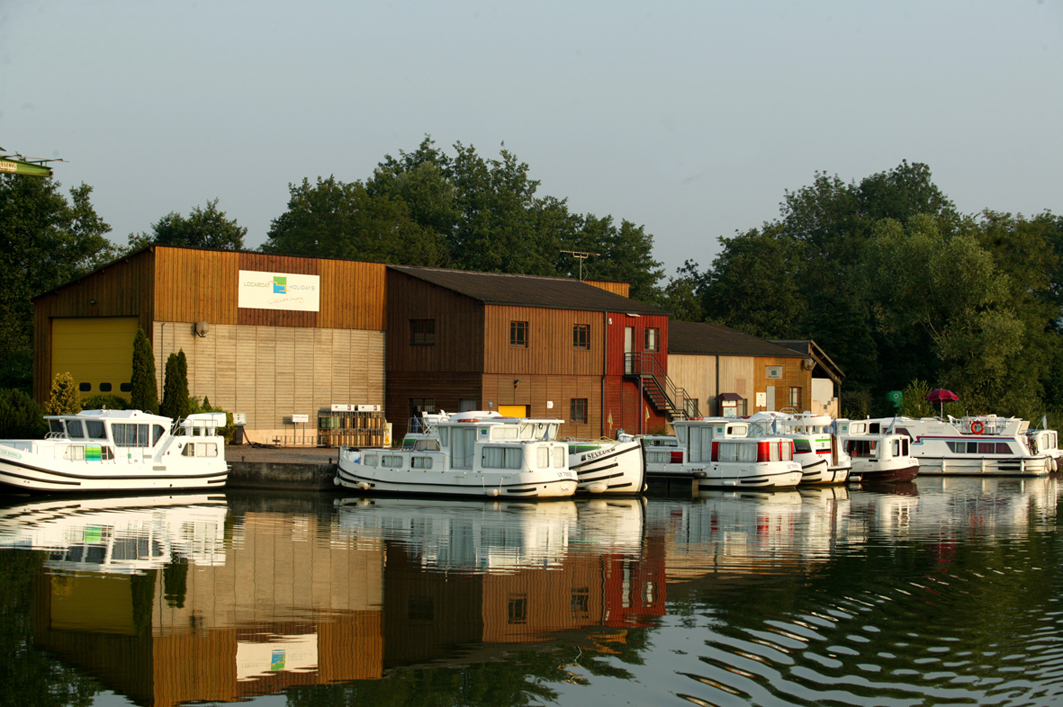

- Coat of arms
- Location of Scey-sur-Saône-et-Saint-Albin
- Location within France Location within Bourgogne-Franche-Comté
- Coordinates: 47°39′57″N 5°58′19″E
- Country: France
- Region: Bourgogne-Franche-Comté
- Department: Haute-Saône
- Arrondissement: Vesoul
- Canton: Scey-sur-Saône-et-Saint-Albin
- Area^{1}: 28.25 km^{2} (10.91 sq mi)
- Highest elevation: 354 m (1,161 ft)
- Lowest elevation: 204 m (669 ft)
- Population (2023): 1,525
  - Density: 53.98/km^{2} (139.8/sq mi)
- Time zone: UTC+01:00 (CET)
  - Summer (DST): UTC+02:00 (CEST)
- INSEE/Postal code: 70482 /70360
- ^{1} French Land Register data, which excludes lakes, ponds, glaciers > 1 km^{2} (0.386 sq mi or 247 acres) and river estuaries.

Scey-sur-Saône-et-Saint-Albin (French pronunciation: [sɛ syʁ son e sɛ̃.t‿albɛ̃], literally Scey on Saône and Saint-Albin) is a commune in the Haute-Saône department in the region of Bourgogne-Franche-Comté in eastern France.

== History ==
Murder victim Céline Figard is buried in the commune.

== See also ==
- Communes of the Haute-Saône department
