= Ombersley =

Village in Worcestershire, England

Coordinates: 52.271302°N 2.228711°W

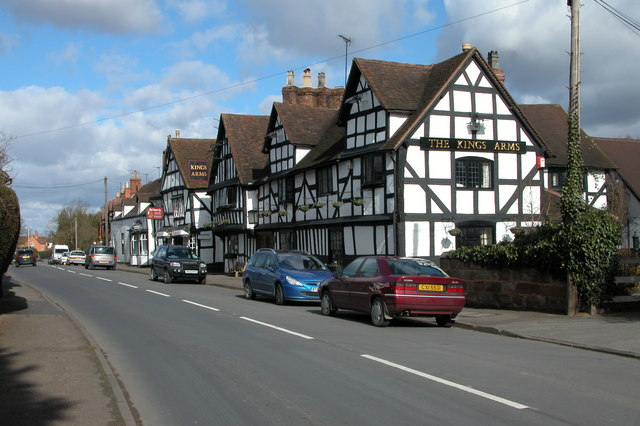
- The Kings Arms, Ombersley

- Location within Worcestershire
- Population: 2,407 (Parish, 2021)
- OS grid reference: SO844635
  - London: 103 miles
- Civil parish: Ombersley
- District: Wychavon
- Shire county: Worcestershire
- Region: West Midlands
- Country: England
- Sovereign state: United Kingdom
- Post town: DROITWICH
- Postcode district: WR9
- Dialling code: 01905
- Police: West Mercia
- Fire: Hereford and Worcester
- Ambulance: West Midlands
- UK Parliament: Droitwich and Evesham

Ombersley is a village and civil parish in the Wychavon district of Worcestershire, England. As well as the village itself, the parish also covers surrounding rural areas with several small hamlets, including Holt Fleet, where Thomas Telford's 1828 Holt Fleet Bridge crosses the River Severn. At the 2021 census the parish had a population of 2,407. Since 1973 it has shared a grouped parish council with the neighbouring parish of Doverdale.

== History ==
The name Ombersley derives from the Old English Ambreslēah meaning 'Ambre's wood/clearing', or amoreslēah, meaning 'yellowhammer wood/clearing'.

The first known reference to the village was the granting of a Charter to Abbot Egwin, later Saint Egwin, of Evesham Abbey in 706 AD. This was the Charter of King Æthelweard of the Hwicce, which granted twelve cassates in Ombersley to the Benedictine Abbey at Evesham.

During the reign of William the Conqueror, the Domesday Book indicates the village was within an exclave of the ancient hundred of Fishborough in 1086 and remained the property of the Abbey of Evesham (Saint Mary). It remained the property of the abbey until the Dissolution of the Monasteries in the early 16th century. By 1848 the village was within the parish of Ombersley (St. Ambrose), in the hundred of Oswaldslow.

=== Royal forest ===
Ombersley was part of a royal forest until 1229. The forest gives the village its name.

=== Ombersley Court ===
Ombersley Court is traditional home of the Lords Sandys, many of whom are buried in the family mausoleum in the churchyard of St Andrew's parish church. When St Andrew's was built in its current form between 1825 and 1829, the chancel of the old church was adapted for use as mausoleum for the lords of the manor. The architect of the church was Thomas Rickman; the cost of building was £18,000 of which two-thirds was contributed by Mary Sandys, dowager Marchioness of Downshire. It is grade I listed.

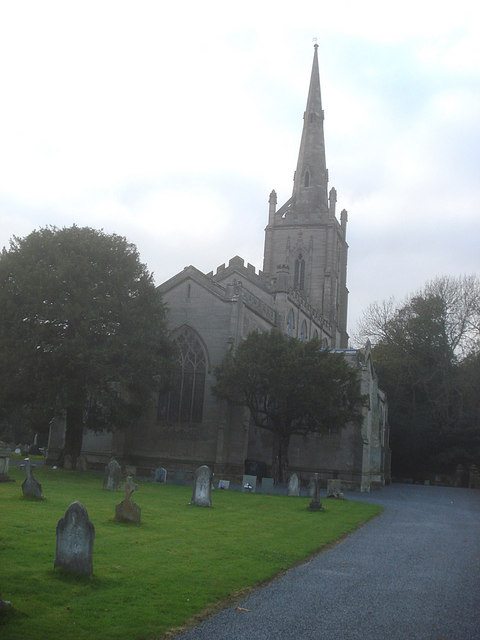
St Andrew's church

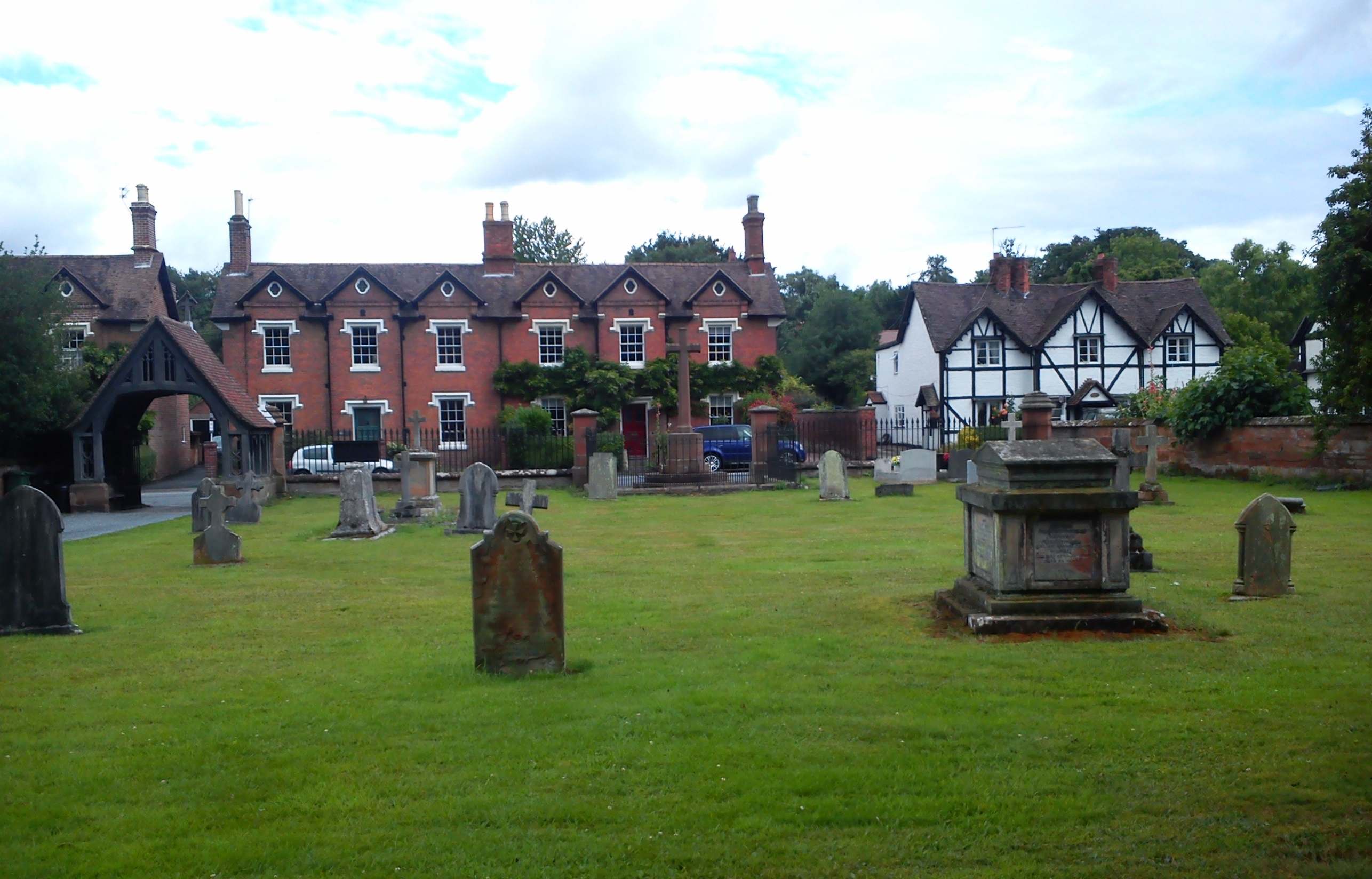
Churchyard of Saint Andrew's church

== Governance ==
There are three tiers of local government covering Ombersley, at parish, district and county level: Ombersley and Doverdale Parish Council, Wychavon District Council, and Worcestershire County Council. The parish council is a grouped parish council, established in 1973 to cover the two parishes of Doverdale and Ombersley. They remain legally separate civil parishes, although they are sometimes inaccurately described as being a single parish.

== Geography ==
Ombersley is 6 miles north of Worcester, 4 miles west of Droitwich, and 10 miles south of Kidderminster on the intersection of the A449 & A4133. The western boundary of the parish is the River Severn; to the east, Hadley Brook forms much of the boundary with the parish of Doverdale in the east, and the River Salwarpe, to the north of the Droitwich Canal, forms the southern boundary before it joins the Severn.

== Listed buildings ==
As of April 2022 there are 151 listed buildings in the parish. Ombersley Court is grade I listed, five buildings are grade II* listed and 145 are at grade II.

== References and further reading ==
- "Parishes: Ombersley". A History of the County of Worcester: volume 3. Victoria County History. 1913. pp. 460–468 – via British History Online.
- Staff. Ombersley Conservation Area Appraisal Wychavon District Council, June 2005
- Davis, Martin (2024). House of Sandys: Fragments from the Ombersley Court Archive. Cricklade, England: Anthony Eyre, Mount Orleans Press. ISBN 9781912945481.
