= Fernhill Heath =

Village in Worcestershire, England

Coordinates: 52.228033°N 2.194711°W

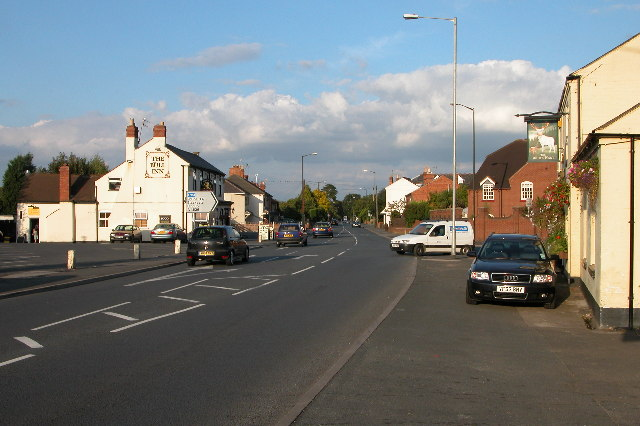

- Location within Worcestershire
- Population: 3,297
- OS grid reference: SO870591
- Civil parish: North Claines
- District: Wychavon
- Shire county: Worcestershire
- Region: West Midlands
- Country: England
- Sovereign state: United Kingdom
- Postcode district: WR3
- Dialling code: 01905

Fernhill Heath is a village in Worcestershire, England. It is in the civil parish of North Claines in Wychavon district. Its built-up area population was 3,297 in 2021.

Fernhill Heath is located on the A38 main road on the north-side of the City of Worcester and is approximately 3 miles (5 km) north of Worcester and 3 miles (5 km) south of Droitwich. The population of Fernhill Heath is around 3,000 people. The village features two public houses, "The White Hart" and "The Bull", a sub-post office, three shops, a primary school, a Baptist church, a war memorial hall and a community centre.

Fernhill Heath railway station opened in 1852 as Fearnall Heath but was closed in April 1965.

One of the oldest properties within Fernhill Heath is Fernhill Heath House which was once owned and occupied by Lady Hindlip (Mrs Allsopp) who had moved into this as a widower upon the death of Lord Hindlip. The house is now owned after extensive renovation 30-ish years ago by Richard Pearce. Agatha Hindlip donated money to the village upon her death to build a bowling green - however only the street name remaining Agatha Gardens.
