= Hawford =

Hamlet in Worcestershire, England

Coordinates: 52.244554°N 2.226491°W

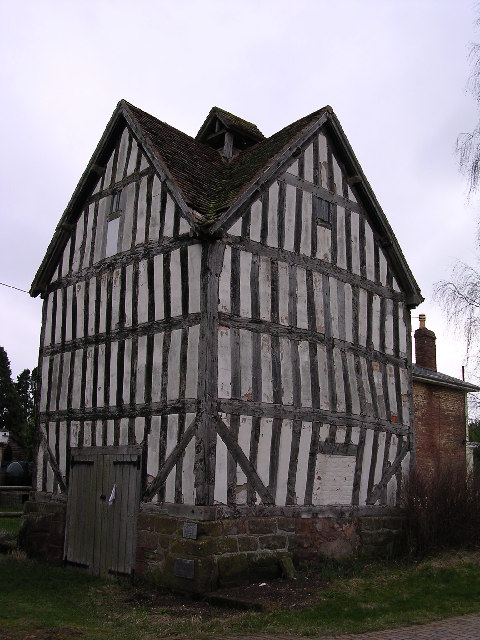
- Hawford dovecot

- Location within Worcestershire
- OS grid reference: SO846607
- District: Wychavon
- Shire county: Worcestershire
- Region: West Midlands
- Country: England
- Sovereign state: United Kingdom
- Police: West Mercia
- Fire: Hereford and Worcester
- Ambulance: West Midlands

Hawford is a hamlet in Worcestershire, England, located in the outer suburbs of Worcester, about 3 miles (4.8 km) from the city centre.

It falls within two parishes, North Claines and Ombersley. It is bisected by the River Salwarpe and the Droitwich-Worcester Canal, and is also bounded by the River Severn.

== Landmarks ==
Hawford Dovecote, owned by the National Trust, is a 16th-century half-timbered building. It is a remnant of a former monastic grange. The Trust describes it as "virtually unaltered since the late 16th century".

Hawford House, located one mile to the south of Hawford, is a Grade II listed 18th century house, now converted to apartments. Charles Castle, of Hawford House, served as High Sheriff of Worcestershire in 1881.
