= Droitwich Canal =

Synthesis of two canals in Worcestershire, England

Droitwich Canals
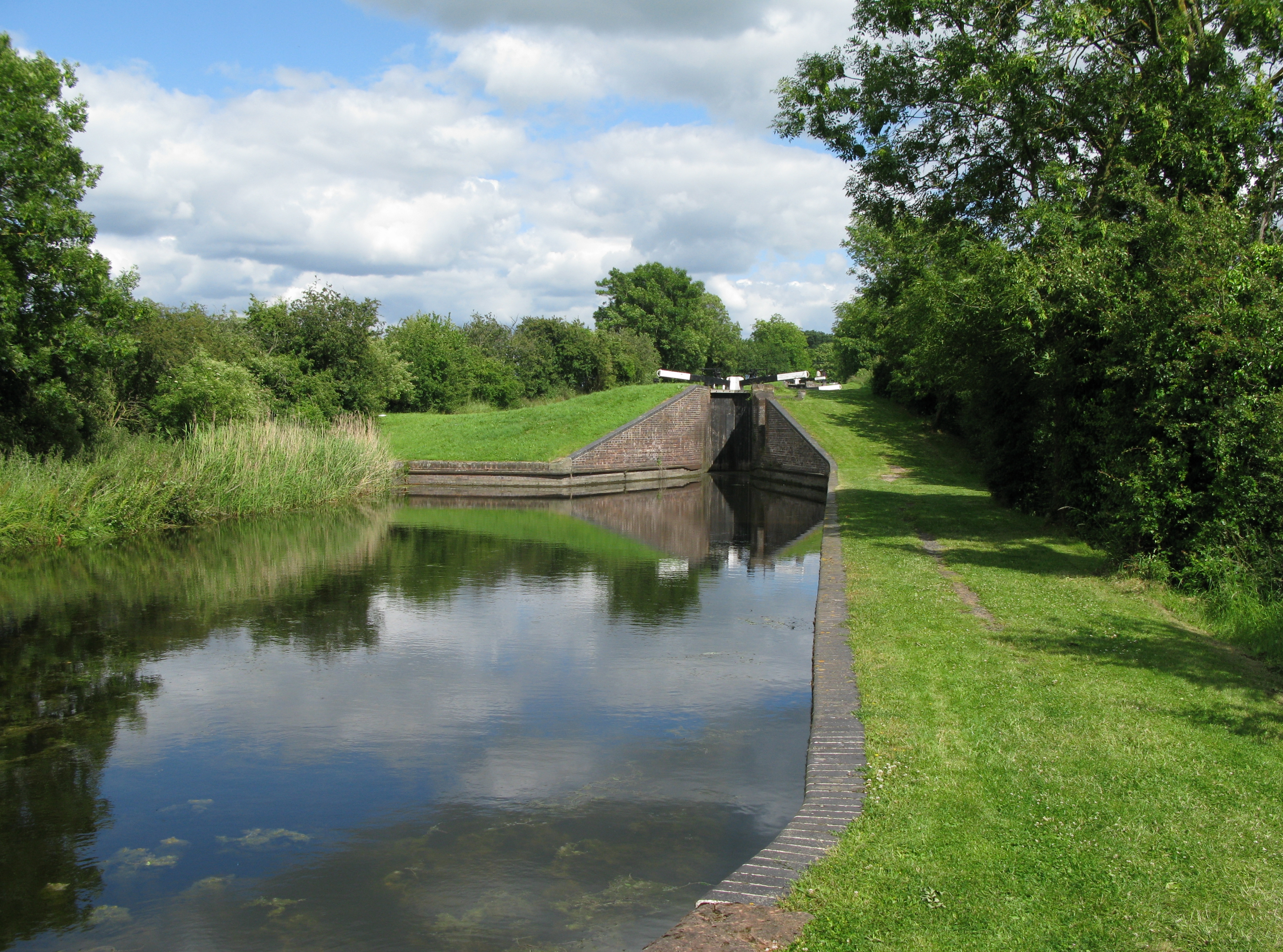
- One of the Hanbury locks

Specifications
- Maximum boat length: 71 ft 6 in (21.79 m) (originally 64 ft 0 in or 19.51 m)
- Maximum boat beam: 7 ft 0 in (2.13 m) (originally 14 ft 6 in or 4.42 m)
- Locks: 14
- Status: Navigable
- Navigation authority: Canal and River Trust

History
- Original owner: Sir George Duckett
- Principal engineer: James Brindley
- Date of act: 1768
- Date completed: 1771, 1854
- Date closed: 1939
- Date restored: 2010 (Barge Canal)

Geography
- Start point: Hanbury
- End point: Claines
- Connects to: Worcester and Birmingham Canal, River Severn

The Droitwich Canal is a synthesis of two canals in Worcestershire, England; the Droitwich Barge Canal and the Droitwich Junction Canal. The Barge Canal is a broad canal which opened in 1771 linking Droitwich Spa to the River Severn at Hawford Bottom Lock, Claines. The Droitwich Junction Canal is a narrow canal, opened in 1854, which linked Droitwich to the Worcester and Birmingham Canal. Both were built to carry salt, and were abandoned in 1939. They have been the subject of a restoration plan since 1973, and the Barge Canal was officially reopened in 2010, while the Junction Canal reopened in July 2011. Following the opening of the canal, ownership transferred to the newly created Canal and River Trust

== History ==
Droitwich has been an important centre for the production of salt, obtained from natural brine springs, since before Roman times. In order to get the product to market, an act of Parliament, the Rivers Stour and Salwarpe Navigation Act 1662 (14 Cha. 2. c. 14 Pr.), was obtained to authorise improvements to the River Salwarpe, but the work was not completed, being abandoned in 1675. The improvements involved six locks on the river, of which five had been built when the scheme failed. Another act of Parliament, obtained in the 1670s, authorised improvements to the Salwarpe and the River Stour, and although the promoters spent £4,000 on the scheme, another bill was put before Parliament in 1693, and a fourth attempt was made in 1703, but this was opposed by owners of the salt works. In 1747, Simon Wood again proposed making the river navigable, and in 1755 there was a scheme to construct a pipeline to carry the brine to Hawford on the River Severn, but both schemes foundered.

Droitwich Canal Act 1768
- Act of Parliament
- Parliament of Great Britain
- Long title: An Act for making and maintaining a navigable Cut or Canal from the River Severn, at or near a Place called Hawford, in the Parish of Claines, in the County of Worcester, to or near a Place called Chapel Bridge, within the Borough of Droitwich, in the said County.
- Citation: 8 Geo. 3. c. 37
- Territorial extent: Great Britain

Dates
- Royal assent: 29 January 1768
- Commencement: 24 November 1767
Other legislation
Amended by	Droitwich Junction Canal Act 1852; Droitwich Canals (Abandonment) Act 1939

Status: Amended

Text of statute as originally enacted

With salt production increasing, Droitwich Council asked James Brindley the canal engineer responsible for the Bridgewater Canal to survey a route from the town to the River Severn. This he did in 1767, and the following year an act of Parliament, the Droitwich Canal Act 1768 (8 Geo. 3. c. 37), was obtained to authorise the construction. This created The Company of Proprietors of the Droitwich Canal Navigation, who had powers to raise £33,400 by issuing shares, and an additional £20,000 if required. Although Brindley was officially "Inspector of the Works", he was busy building the Trent and Mersey Canal at the time, and so the contractor responsible for building the locks was sent by John Priddey, the resident engineer, to work with and be taught by Brindley. A working capital of £13,400 was raised by issuing 134 shares, mostly bought by local people, and construction started on 27 June 1768. As work proceeded, a further 66 shares were issued, raising another £6,600, and a loan of £3,500 was taken out, making the total cost of the project £23,500.

The canal was constructed as a broad canal, capable of taking Severn Trows which were 14.5 feet (4.4 m) wide and 64 feet (20 m) long. Like most of Brindley's canals, it was a contour canal, following the contours as much as possible, to reduce the number of embankments and cuttings required, although there was an awkward bend near Salwarpe church, as the obvious route to the north of the building was specifically excluded by the Droitwich Canal Act 1768. The canal was 5.7 miles (9.2 km) long, and included eight locks, with a total fall of 56.5 feet (17.2 m). Because of the presence of brine springs, the water was salty, and did not support populations of fresh-water fish.

The official opening was on 12 March 1771, and the canal was a commercial success. The first dividend was paid in 1775 and by 1777 the £100 shares were trading at £160. A proposal in 1784 to link to the Stourbridge Canal caused disagreement among the shareholders, but the bill to construct the new canal and amalgamate the two companies failed. After the event, the company changed its rules on proxy voting, since it felt that some of those who had voted for amalgamation had not been shareholders, and therefore had not upheld the interests of the canal.

=== Operation ===
With the prospect of the Worcester and Birmingham Canal causing the profitability of the canal to suffer, the company negotiated a clause in the Worcester and Birmingham Canal Act 1791 (31 Geo. 3. c. 59) for the new enterprise, that would guarantee a 5 per cent dividend on Droitwich shares. The agreement was made in March 1790, and as dividends had never been as high as 5 per cent, they started to claim the difference immediately, even though the new canal was not yet built. A claim was made every year, although the Worcester and Birmingham eventually declined to make payments, on the basis that the Droitwich was not encouraging trade sufficiently. The case went to court in 1808, and they had to pay. By November 1810, the Worcester and Birmingham took over the management of the canal, although little seems to have changed, for after an amalgamation attempt in 1821, which was abandoned when the landowner, Lord Somers, objected, the Droitwich company noted that the Worcester and Birmingham had often attempted to meddle in the management of the canal. The repeal of a tax on salt in 1822 and 1825 resulted in the company being able to pay 5 per cent dividends from the late 1820s out of revenue, and only a few claims to honour the guarantee were made subsequently.

Droitwich Junction Canal Act 1852 (Note: Section 2.)
- Act of Parliament
- Parliament of the United Kingdom
- Long title: An Act for making a Canal from the Droitwich Canal at Droitwich in the County of Worcester, to join the Worcester and Birmingham Canal at or near Hanbury Wharf in the Parish of Hanbury in the same County, and to be called "The Droitwich Junction Canal."
- Citation: 15 & 16 Vict. c. xxii
- Territorial extent: United Kingdom

Dates
- Royal assent: 28 May 1852
- Commencement: 28 May 1852 (Note: The Acts of Parliament (Commencement) Act 1793.)
Other legislation
Amends	Droitwich Canal Act 1768
Amended by	Sharpness Docks and Gloucester and Birmingham Navigation Act 1935; Droitwich Canals (Abandonment) Act 1939

Status: Amended

Text of statute as originally enacted

The fortunes of the canal started to decline after 1830, when a source of brine was discovered at Stoke Prior, a village to the north east of Droitwich. Much of this was carried overland to the Worcester and Birmingham, where it was taken northwards, but tolls for its carriage on the River Severn were also negotiated so that the price of the product in Gloucester and Bristol was competitive with that using the Droitwich Canal. The coming of the railways took further trade away, although it particularly affected salt from Stoke Prior, and in order to eliminate the overland carriage of both salt and coal, the Droitwich Junction Canal Act 1852 (15 & 16 Vict. c. xxii) was obtained for the construction of the Droitwich Junction Canal, to connect the barge canal to Hanbury Wharf on the Worcester and Birmingham. The company who built it was in theory independent, but the intent was that the Worcester and Birmingham would lease it once it was finished, at a rate which would pay a 5 per cent dividend. They also leased the barge canal from 1853 for 21 years.

In order to make it easier to compete with the railways, the locks on the barge canal were lengthened, so that coal could be carried up the River Severn and through both canals without having to be transhipped to shorter boats. This work was completed by mid-1854, and the Junction Canal was opened in late 1854. Built as a narrow canal, suitable for boats which were 7 feet (2.1 m) wide, it was one of the last canals to be built in the Canal Mania era. It was 1.75 miles (2.82 km) long and included another six locks, the final one of which connected the canal to the River Salwarpe. After 160 yards (150 m) on the river, the original sluice through which the barge canal was supplied with water had been converted to a wide lock, which enabled boats from the barge canal to use the river to reach a salt works situated above Chapel Bridge. The Barge Lock was 75 by 15 feet (22.9 by 4.6 m), and had four sets of gates, so that it could be used whatever the level of the river. Subsidence beneath it was a problem, as it had to be rebuilt in 1875/6 and 1903, the first time to raise it by 9 feet (2.7 m) and the second to raise it another 5 feet (1.5 m). The main cargo on both canals was always salt.

=== Decline ===
Droitwich Canals (Abandonment) Act 1939
- Act of Parliament
- Parliament of the United Kingdom
- Long title: An Act to provide for the abandonment of the Droitwich Canal and the Droitwich Junction Canal and the vesting thereof in the Droitwich Corporation; and for other purposes.
- Citation: 2 & 3 Geo. 6. c. lx
- Territorial extent: United Kingdom

Dates
- Royal assent: 13 July 1939
- Commencement: 13 July 1939
Other legislation
Amends	Droitwich Canal Act 1768; Droitwich Junction Canal Act 1852

Status: Current legislation

With their financial position worsening, the Worcester and Birmingham Canal received an offer from three railway contractors to buy the canal and the Junction Canal, to convert them into railways. The canal company accepted the offer, but when a bill was submitted to Parliament in 1866, it was defeated, as was a second attempt the following year. In September 1873, the Worcester and Birmingham Canal received an offer from the Sharpness New Docks Company to take over the canal and both Droitwich Canals. The Gloucester and Berkeley Canal Act 1874 (37 & 38 Vict. c. clxxxi) was obtained to authorise the takeover, and the new company became the Sharpness New Docks and Gloucester and Birmingham Navigation Company. They set to work improving the Worcester and Birmingham route, but soon realised that the canal was not profitable. Despite this, they dredged 73,000 tons of mud from the Droitwich Canals in 1881, and altered the upper cills of the locks in 1888-9, to give a navigable depth of 6 feet (1.8 m). The locks were then 77 by 15 feet (23.5 by 4.6 m), and could accommodate boats of 115 tons. By 1906, the costs of maintenance on both canals exceeded the income, and they gradually decayed. Finally, an act of Parliament authorising abandonment, the Droitwich Canals (Abandonment) Act 1939 (2 & 3 Geo. 6. c. lx) was obtained in July 1939. The last boat to use the barge canal had done so in 1916, while the Junction Canal had not seen any traffic since 1928.

== Restoration ==
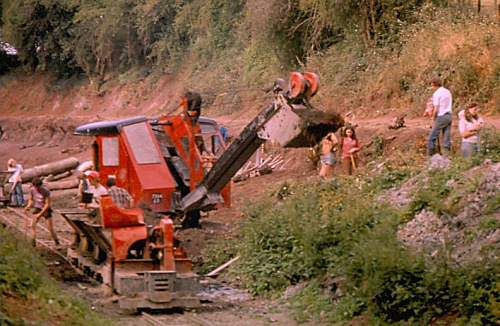
Excavation of the canal bed at Salwarpe during WRG Summer Work Camp, 1978

The problem of what to do with the canals was regularly debated by Droitwich Borough Council in 1963, and a campaign for their restoration was started by Max Sinclair, who suggested that restoration could be completed in under two years. The council realised the potential amenity value of the canal, and the concept was aired in the Worcester Evening News, which carried an illustrated article on 14 June 1966. A restoration group was formed in 1969, as part of a national drive by the Inland Waterways Association called Safeguarding Britain's Waterways, which led to the formation in 1973 of the Droitwich Canals Trust, a limited company with local authority support, which began to work towards the restoration of the canal. On 27–28 October 1973 The Droitwich Dig, organized by the Waterway Recovery Group, gathered together the largest number of volunteers then ever assembled at a restoration site. In 1975, the canal was one of thirteen to benefit from the Job Creation Scheme, set up by the Manpower Services Commission, which provided paid workers to work on restoration and maintenance.

Funding came from various sources. These included £200,000 from Wychavon District Council in 1980, which funded work in Vines Park, including a mooring basin, while a new swing bridge was funded by an award from Shell. The following year, the Manpower Services Commission provided 15 workers with a budget of £19,000 for materials. The section of the barge canal through Vines Park was opened in October 1986, enabling the Trust's trip-boat to provide longer trips. An engineering feasibility study was carried out in 1994, which concluded that restoration was certainly possible, and would bring with it economic benefits to the region. It was presented to a packed meeting, at which the problems of passing beneath the A449 at Hawford and of ensuring an adequate water supply were identified. The scheme had the support of the local authorities, who were keen to identify sources of funding, without which the restoration was unlikely to be completed.

In 2002, British Waterways held their Unlocked and Unlimited conference, which identified that completion of the Droitwich scheme would require some £9.5 million. Two years later, the Heritage Lottery Fund awarded £4.6 million for the project, with other funding provided by Advantage West Midlands and the local councils. As part of this, British Waterways took over the lease of the canals from the Droitwich Canal Trust. A planning application for the restoration was submitted by British Waterways on behalf of the Droitwich Canals Restoration Partnership in April 2007, by which time a total of £10.5 million had been promised, some of which was dependent on match funding, and the Restoration Partnership needed to raise £1 million in order to release the other funding.

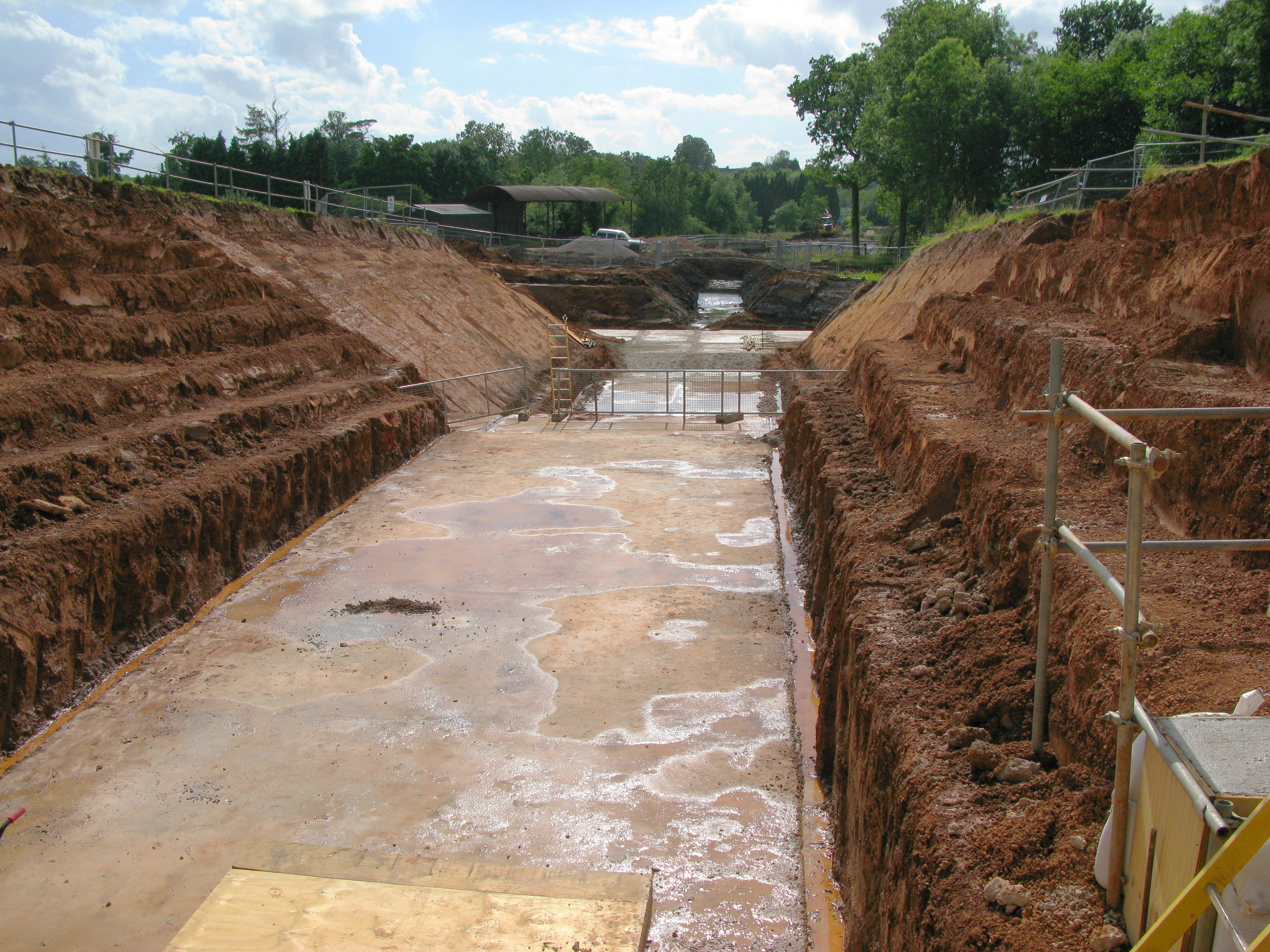
The new double lock needed to get under the M5 motorway during construction

The project was planned to take two years, with both of the Droitwich Canals completely restored and reopened in 2009. Although the majority of the 7-mile (11 km) length of the canals was still in existence, a 550-yard (500 m) stretch between the M5 motorway and Hanbury Locks had to be completely rebuilt. The existing culvert for the Body Brook has been used to allow the canal to pass under the motorway.

The Barge Canal and the Junction Canal have been connected together by canalising a 600-yard (550 m) stretch of the River Salwarpe through the centre of Droitwich. The course of the river has been made wider and deeper, and a weir has been constructed adjacent to the new lock 7, to maintain the water levels. In order to minimise the mixing of canal water with river water, a pipeline has been built under the towpath, running from just above lock 7 to just below the Barge Lock. The river improvements were to be partially funded by a Section 106 agreement, as part of a housing development along the river bank, but the withdrawal of the developer from the scheme resulted in delays, which put back the full opening of the canal. The Droitwich Barge Canal opened officially on 11 September 2010, and the whole canal was completed by mid-2011, with the official opening held on 1 July.

== Map ==
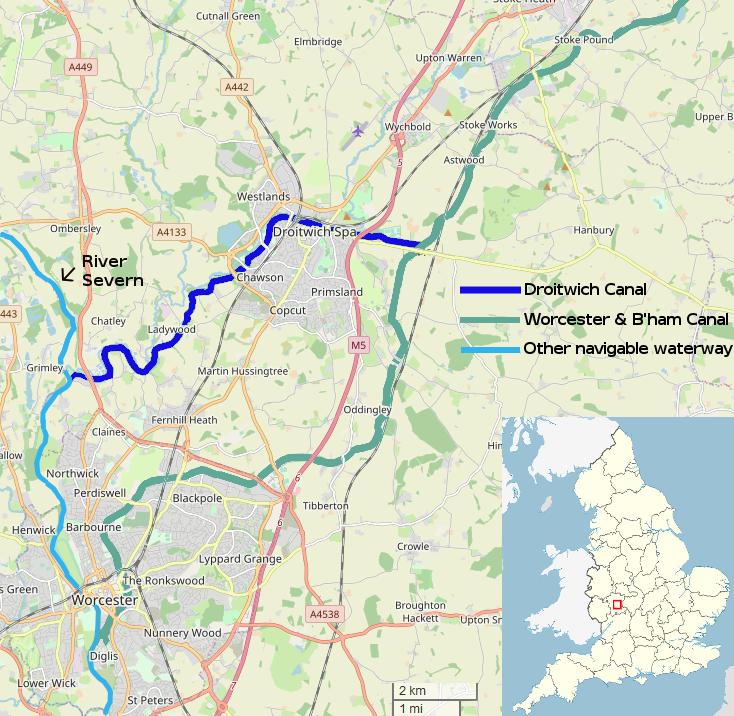
Map of the Droitwich Canal

== Points of interest ==
Point	Coordinates (Links to map resources)	OS Grid Ref	Notes
Jn with Worcs and B'ham Canal	52.2650°N 2.1151°W	SO922629	
M5 culvert	52.2672°N 2.1332°W	SO910632	
Barge Lock	52.2696°N 2.1456°W	SO901635	
Ladywood Lock	52.2478°N 2.1944°W	SO868610	
A449 Hawford Bridge	52.2381°N 2.2261°W	SO846600	
Jn with River Severn	52.2374°N 2.2322°W	SO842599	

== See also ==
- Canals of the United Kingdom
- History of the British canal system

== Bibliography ==
- Cumberlidge, Jane (2009). Inland Waterways of Great Britain (8th Ed). Imray Laurie Norie and Wilson. ISBN 978-1-84623-010-3.
- Fairhurst, Richard (July 2011). "Guide to the Droitwich Canals". Waterways World. 40 (7). ISSN 0309-1422.
- Hadfield, Charles (1985). The Canals of The West Midlands (3rd Ed). Brunel House, Hewton Abbot, Devon: David and Charles. ISBN 978-0-7153-8644-6.
- Priestley, Joseph (1831). "Historical Account of the Navigable Rivers, Canals, and Railways of Great Britain". Archived from the original on 3 March 2016.
- Shill, Ray (2011). Silent Highways - The Forgotten Heritage of the Midlands Canals. Stroud: History Press. ISBN 978-0-75245842-7.
- Squires, Roger (2008). Britain's restored canals. Landmark Publishing. ISBN 978-1-84306-331-5.
