= River Salwarpe =

River in Worcestershire, England

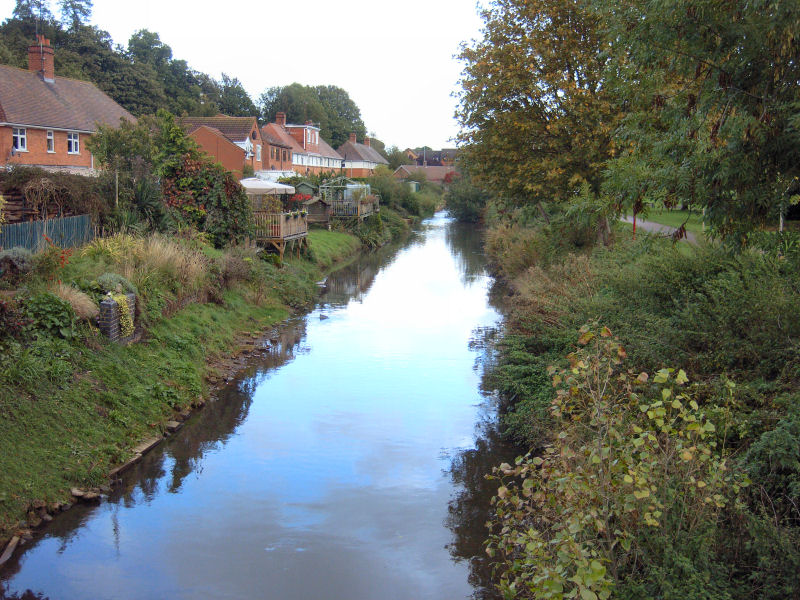
- River Salwarpe in Vines Park, Droitwich

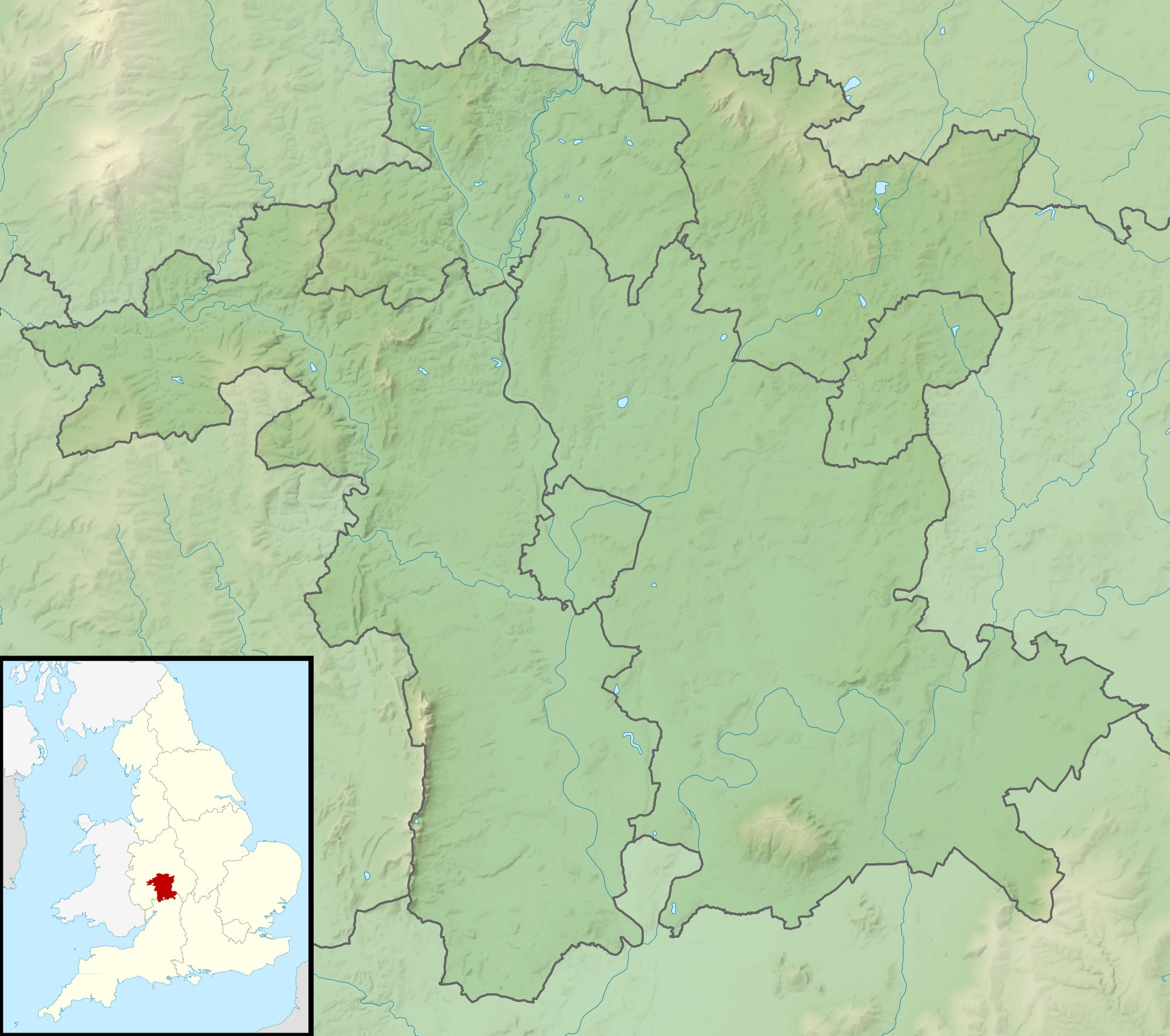
- Location within Worcestershire

Location
- Country: England
- Counties: Worcestershire

Physical characteristics
- Mouth
  - location: River Severn
  - coordinates: 52.2388°N 2.2334°W
- Length: 32.8 km (20.4 mi)
- Basin size: 196 km^{2} (76 sq mi)
- Discharge
  - location: Harford Hill
  - average: 1.35 m^{3}/s (48 cu ft/s)

The River Salwarpe is a 20.4 miles (32.8 km) long river in Worcestershire, England. It is a left bank tributary of the River Severn, which it joins near Hawford.

== Course ==
The Salwarpe is formed by the confluence of the Battlefield and Spadesbourne Brooks in Bromsgrove; it then passes Stoke Prior, Upton Warren, Wychbold, and Droitwich. Downstream of Droitwich, it passes Salwarpe, and then meets the River Severn, near Hawford.

Andrew Yarranton attempted unsuccessfully to make it navigable in the 1660s, but in the 21st century a stretch of the river in Droitwich was canalized to link the Barge and Junction sections of the Droitwich Canal.

Tributaries include the Elmbridge, Hadley and Hen brooks.

== Hydrology ==
The flow of the Salwarpe has been measured in its lower reaches at Harford Hill since 1958. The long-term record shows that the catchment of 184 square kilometres (71 sq mi) to the gauging station yielded an average flow of 1.35 cubic metres per second (48 cu ft/s). The highest river level recorded at the station occurred in January 1960 with a height of 2.69 metres (8 ft 10 in), giving a corresponding flow of 39 cubic metres per second (1,400 cu ft/s).

The Salwarpe catchment upstream of the station has an average annual rainfall of 666 millimetres (26.2 in) and a maximum altitude of 294 metres (965 ft) at Beacon Hill, in Lickey Hills Country Park at its north-eastern edge. Land use is primarily agricultural arable and grassland.

== Water quality ==
The Environment Agency measures the water quality of the river systems in England. Each is given an overall ecological status, which may be one of five levels: high, good, moderate, poor and bad. Several components are used to determine this, including biological status, which looks at the quantity and varieties of invertebrates, angiosperms and fish. Chemical status, which compares the concentrations of various chemicals against known safe concentrations, is rated good or fail.

The water quality of the Salwarpe and its tributaries was as follows in 2016.

Section	Ecological Status	Chemical Status	Overall Status	Length	Catchment
Battlefield Bk - source to conf Spadesbourne Bk	Moderate	Good	Moderate	10.4 kilometres (6.5 mi)	19.1 square kilometres (7.4 sq mi)
Spadesbourne Bk - source to conf Battlefield Bk	Moderate	Good	Moderate	5.1 kilometres (3.2 mi)	10 square kilometres (3.9 sq mi)
Salwarpe - source to conf Elmbridge Bk	Poor	Good	Poor	21.9 kilometres (13.6 mi)	58.3 square kilometres (22.5 sq mi)
Elmbridge Bk - source to conf R Salwarpe	Poor	Good	Poor	10.1 kilometres (6.3 mi)	31.5 square kilometres (12.2 sq mi)
Hadley Bk - source to conf R Salwarpe	Poor	Good	Poor	26.4 kilometres (16.4 mi)	55.3 square kilometres (21.4 sq mi)
Salwarpe - conf Elmbridge Bk to conf R Severn	Poor	Good	Poor	10.8 kilometres (6.7 mi)	21.8 square kilometres (8.4 sq mi)

The water quality of all the riverine waterbodies in the lower catchment have regressed from moderate in 2009 to poor in 2016. The two upper tributaries remained at moderate. Chemical quality is good in the Salwarpe and its four monitored tributaries.

== See also ==
- List of rivers in England
