= WR postcode area =

Postcode area within the United Kingdom

Worcester
- Postcode area
- Coordinates: 52.167°N 2.188°W
- Country: United Kingdom
- Postcode area: WR
- Postcode area name: Worcester
- Post towns: 7
- Postcode districts: 17
- Postcode sectors: 50
- Postcodes (live): 8,733
- Postcodes (total): 12,461
- Statistics as at May 2020

The WR postcode area, also known as the Worcester postcode area, is a group of fifteen postcode districts in England, within seven post towns. These cover central and southern Worcestershire (including Worcester, Broadway, Droitwich, Evesham, Malvern, Pershore and Tenbury Wells), plus very small parts of Herefordshire, Shropshire, Warwickshire and Gloucestershire.

== Coverage ==
The approximate coverage of the postcode districts:

Postcode district	Post town	Coverage	Local authority area(s)
WR1	WORCESTER	Worcester	Worcester
WR2	WORCESTER	Powick, Hallow	Worcester, Malvern Hills
WR3	WORCESTER	Fernhill Heath, Claines	Worcester, Wychavon
WR4	WORCESTER	Warndon, Long Meadow	Worcester, Wychavon
WR5	WORCESTER	Kempsey, Broomhall	Worcester, Wychavon, Malvern Hills
WR6	WORCESTER	Martley, Clifton on Teme, Abberley	Malvern Hills, Wyre Forest, Herefordshire
WR7	WORCESTER	Inkberrow, Crowle, Upton Snodsbury	Wychavon
WR8	WORCESTER	Upton upon Severn, Hanley Castle, Hanley Swan	Malvern Hills, Wychavon
WR9	DROITWICH	Droitwich, Ombersley, Wychbold, Rushock	Wychavon, Wyre Forest
WR10	PERSHORE	Pershore, Eckington, Drakes Broughton	Wychavon
WR11	BROADWAY		non-geographic
WR11	EVESHAM	Evesham, Harvington, Badsey, Sedgeberrow, Ashton under Hill	Wychavon, Stratford-on-Avon, Tewkesbury, Cotswold
WR12	BROADWAY	Broadway, Willersey, Childswickham	Wychavon, Tewkesbury, Cotswold
WR13	MALVERN	Colwall, Cradley, Welland	Malvern Hills, Herefordshire, Forest of Dean
WR14	MALVERN	Malvern, Upper Welland	Malvern Hills, Herefordshire
WR15	TENBURY WELLS	Tenbury Wells, Burford, Newnham Bridge, Bockleton	Malvern Hills, Wyre Forest, Shropshire, Herefordshire
WR78	WORCESTER	Kays Ltd	non-geographic
WR99	WORCESTER	Kays Ltd	non-geographic

== Map ==
WR postcode area map, showing postcode districts in red and post towns in grey text, with links to nearby B, CV, DY, GL, HR and SY postcode areas.

== See also ==
- Postcode Address File
- List of postcode areas in the United Kingdom
