= Henry Vaux =

English recusant and poet

- Born: c. 1559
- Died: 19 November 1587 (aged 27–28); Leicestershire, England
- Noble family: Vaux
- Father: William Vaux, 3rd Baron Vaux of Harrowden
- Mother: Elizabeth Beaumont
- Occupation: Recusant, poet

Henry Vaux (c. 1559 – 19 November 1587) was an English recusant, priest smuggler, and poet during the reign of Elizabeth I. He was the eldest child of William Vaux, 3rd Baron Vaux of Harrowden. His first wife, Elizabeth Beaumont, was the daughter of John Beaumont of Grace Dieu, Leicester. Both of Vaux's parents came from traditionally Catholic families.

== Family life ==
After Henry's birth, William Vaux had three more children with his first wife: Eleanore (later to become the well-known priest-smuggler and recusant, Mrs. Brooksby), Elizabeth (who became a Franciscan nun in Rouen) and Anne (who assisted Eleanore's recusant work under the pseudonym ‘Mrs. Perkins’). After his first wife's death, Lord Vaux married Mary Tresham in 1563. The new Lady Vaux was the sister of Sir Thomas Tresham who was to become a leading recusant spokesman in the Elizabethan age. The Tresham and Vaux families had been cordial neighbours for generations and had often intermarried. William Vaux had five more children with this second marriage: George, Edward, Ambrose, Muriel, and Catherine.

== Edmund Campion ==
Lord Vaux's eldest two children, Henry and Eleanore, proved to be prodigious learners, and in 1568 their father hired Edmund Campion of Oxford University (a future Jesuit martyr) to tutor them for several months. Later, on the eve of his departure to mainland Europe to study for Catholic orders, Campion wrote a letter of encouragement to Henry Vaux, his young former pupil, in Latin. Here is a brief (translated) extract:

From the day your Father first asked me to see you and to superintend your education I have become amazingly attached to you. For I marveled and was almost perplexed when I saw a boy who had not yet completed his ninth year, scion of a notable family, of such pleasant demeanour and refinement; who wrote and spoke Latin so well; who was equally good at prose and verse, accurate and quick at figures, devoted to the study of letters, diligent in application, able to sketch out and arrange his whole course of study. If circumstances had permitted it I should have desired nothing better than to give my enthusiastic help to that celebrated man, your Father, and to you, a boy of such great promise. But since some unknown fate, yours and mine, has deprived you of me and me of you, your Father (by whom I am dearly loved, and whom I particularly revere) has easily persuaded me that my voice and advice should come to you. ... Oxford, 28 July 1570.

== Changing circumstances ==
In 1571, William Vaux moved with his family to the grander family seat at Harrowden with the second Lady Vaux. The children of his first marriage were entrusted to the care of their maternal grandmother for the next ten years. She was provided with £20 annually for Henry and £10 for each of his three sisters. Lord Vaux formed an agreement with Sir Thomas Tresham whereby the knight would receive £100 per annum for a period of fifteen years and provide a dowry of £500 each for Eleanore, Elizabeth, and Anne.

It was probably at his grandmother's residence that Henry Vaux wrote those poems of his which have survived. Some ("No trust in Fortune", "Beautie is brittle", and "Meditatio de Passione Christi") are dated as having been written when he was thirteen (c. 1572) and others (the Agamemnon poems) when he was seventeen (c.1576), but the similarity in style and subject in the remaining undated poems suggests that they were also written during his teenage years. Incidentally, Henry Vaux's cousins, Francis and John Beaumont, the playwright and the poet, came from the same home.

== Priest smuggling ==
In 1580, Edmund Campion and Robert Persons, another leading Jesuit, were sent to England by Cardinal Allen and the Jesuit Father General. The pair reached England in June 1580, and on their arrival in London were met by George Gilbert, the organiser of an association of young Catholic gentlemen whose task it was to assist and provide for the missionary priests. Henry Vaux was one of the chief members of this group, as was his brother-in-law Edward Brooksby. From 1580 until his arrest in 1586, Henry Vaux was continually involved in sheltering priests.

== Refusal to marry ==
In an attempt to secure the family's financial situation, Lord Vaux decided to arrange a profitable marriage for Henry. Henry refused, however, as he had decided to lead a contemplative life. In 1585 Henry Vaux reluctantly signed an agreement whereby his half-brother George would inherit the interests of the barony while he would receive a modest annuity for himself. After Henry Vaux's death the title would pass to George or his heir, thus reuniting the barony with the family fortune.

== Unwanted attention ==
In August 1584 Henry Vaux was mentioned in a report to Sir Francis Walsingham, the Queen's spymaster, and from this time onwards his name appeared regularly in confessions and the reports of spies. (Henry Vaux unwittingly had two apostate priests in his employ). By May 1585, the government knew that Henry Vaux was serving as treasurer for the priest-smuggling network. At around that time he attended a large meeting of Jesuits, recusants, and secular clergy in Hoxton, which established a fund for the support of the Catholic clergy and to which he promised one hundred marks.

In May 1585 Anthony Babington visited Lord Vaux in Hackney about purchasing land from him in Nottinghamshire. While seemingly innocent enough, the Vaux family's subsequent association with Babington aroused the suspicions of Walsingham's spy network. Henry Vaux's house was closely watched once Walsingham became aware of the plot and in August 1586 Henry Vaux was named in a list of Babington's regular associates. Not only was he by now the de facto leader of the priest smuggling network, but he had been associated in the past with other conspirators such as Francis Throckmorton, a distant cousin, who had been executed in 1584 for conspiring to assassinate the Queen in 1583. Lord Vaux and Sir Thomas Tresham were suspected of being willing to aid the Babington Plot but were both in prison at the time.

== Southwell, Garnett and Arrest ==
Robert Southwell and Henry Garnett (two future martyrs) arrived in England on 23 July 1586. Garnett was housed by Eleanore Brooksby and her sister Anne at Shoby while Robert Southwell took up residence at Henry Vaux's home in Hackney. From 1586-1587 Robert Southwell had the use of the Vaux house in Hackney. On 4 November 1586, the chief magistrate of London, Richard Young, led a search of the Vaux house but could not find Southwell. They did, however, arrest Henry Vaux, who was brought before the Privy Council and committed to the Marshalsea Prison.

== Leave and death ==
On 22 May 1587 Henry Vaux was granted three months’ sick-leave from the Marshalsea. He had contracted consumption (modern-day pulmonary tuberculosis) and went to recuperate in Leicestershire where he was cared for by his sisters, Anne and Eleanore. He died unexpectedly on 19 November 1587 and was buried in the local parish. Father Henry Garnett later claimed that Henry Vaux uttered the simple vows of a Jesuit priest on his deathbed. However, Robert Persons makes no mention of Henry Vaux desiring to become a Jesuit, but rather indicates that he desired to lead a contemplative and celibate life. Persons makes the following tribute to Henry Vaux:

That blessed gentleman and saint, Mr. Henry Vaux, whose life was a rare mirror of religion and holiness unto all that knew him and conversed with him. He died most sweetly and comfortably in England, having resigned long before his death, and in his perfect health, his inheritance to the barony to his younger brother, reserving only a small annuity to himself whereby to live in study and prayer all the days of his life, without marrying, as he fully resolved to do. (Persons: 1878, pp.29-30)

== See also ==
- William Vaux, 3rd Baron Vaux of Harrowden
- Eleanor Brooksby
- Anne Vaux
