= Christopher Bagshaw =

English academic and Roman Catholic priest

- Born: c. 1552; Derbyshire, United Kingdom
- Died: c. 1625; Paris, France
- Burial place: Paris, France

Christopher Bagshaw (1552 – 1625?) was an English academic and Roman Catholic priest.

== Life ==
Christopher Bagshaw came from a Derbyshire family. He graduated B.A. on 12 July 1572, at Balliol College, Oxford and, in the same year, was elected probationer fellow of his college. Before going to Oxford, he matriculated in 1566 at St John's College, Cambridge. According to Anthony à Wood, he owed his fellowship to the influence of Robert Parsons, but Wood's editor, Philip Bliss, contradicts him; connecting Bagshaw with the expulsion of Parsons from the college. On 21 June 1575, Bagshaw took the degree of M.A. At this time, he was a strong if quarrelsome Protestant.

About 1579, Bagshaw became Principal of Gloucester Hall, where he made himself very unpopular. He resigned this office and, in 1582, went to France. Here, he became a convert to Catholicism and was made a priest. Then, with the permission of Cardinal William Allen, he was admitted to the English College, Rome; but his temper made him so unpopular that he was expelled by Cardinal Boncompagni. On leaving Rome, he returned to Paris, where he became a doctor of divinity at the Sorbonne. Jesuit writers styled him derisively doctor erraticus and doctor per saltum.

Christopher Bagshaw went to England as a missioner and, in 1587, was imprisoned in the Tower of London. In 1593, he was confined with other Catholics in Wisbech Castle. He clashed with Father William Weston, who found him disobedient, setting off the "Wisbech Stirs". When examined at the Tower for treasonable practices, Edward Squire, an emissary from some English priests in Spain, affirmed that he had come with a letter (which he threw into the sea off Plymouth) from Father Henry Walpole to Bagshaw at Wisbech. After his liberation, Bagshaw continued to reside abroad.

In 1612, he held a disputation with Daniel Featley concerning transubstantiation. Wood says that Bagshaw died and was buried at Paris after 1625, citing Franciscus à Santa Clara.

== Works ==
Christopher Bagshaw published, at Paris in 1603, 'An Answer to certain points of a Libel called An Apology of the Subordination in England,' 8vo. He is also thought to have been concerned in

- 'Relatio compendiosa Turbarum quas Jesuitæ Angli una cum D. Georgio Blackwello, Archipresbytero, Sacerdotibus Seminariorum Populoque Catholico concivere,' &c., Rothomagi, 1601, (published under the name of John Mush);
- 'A true Relation of the Faction begun at Wisbich by Father Emonds, alias Weston, a Jesuit, 1595, and continued since by Father Walley, alias Garnet, the Provincial of the Jesuits in England, and by Father Parsons in Rome,' 1601.

== Notes ==
Attribution

This article incorporates text from a publication now in the public domain: "Bagshaw, Christopher". Dictionary of National Biography. London: Smith, Elder & Co. 1885–1900.
