= Bavant =

Bavant may refer to:

- John Bavant (fl. 1550–1598) English Roman Catholic priest
- Fifield Bavant, a village in Wiltshire, England
- Norton Bavant, a village in Wiltshire, England
