= William Bavand =

English writer

William Bavand (died 1575) was an English lawyer and translator. He is chiefly remembered as the translator of Johannes Ferrarius's The Good Ordering of a Commonweal (1559).

== Family ==
We know very little of the family of William Bavand. His father was Robert Bavand of Rostherne in Cheshire. There were many Bavands in Cheshire, but no connection has been traced between them and Robert and his son William. It is probable, however, that he was related to the recusant priest John Bavant, also of Cheshire origins. In his will of 1575, William Bavand named his wife as Barsaba, and stated himself to be of Stoke Albany in Northamptonshire.

== Lawyer at the Middle Temple ==
On 15 August 1557, William Bavand was admitted to the Middle Temple in London, one of the Inns of Court, where young men were trained in the law. His pledge was Edward Martin of Wokingham, Surrey (d. 1604). In 1558, Bavand himself stood pledge to Thomas Bowyer of London (d. 1595), who married Magdalen, the daughter of the exiled theologian Bartholomew Traheron. Bavand rose quickly through the ranks of the Middle Temple. By 1561, he served as under-treasurer, under the celebrated legal scholar Edmund Plowden. By 1569, he had stepped down as under-treasurer, and he is last heard of at the Middle Temple in 1573.

== Roman Catholic Connections ==
Bavand made some useful connections at the Middle Temple. In 1570, he was left £5 in the will of the Worcestershire gentleman William Sheldon (d. 1570) of Beoley. Sheldon had studied at the Middle Temple in his youth, and his daughter Catherine married Edmund Plowden. Bavand may have moved in the circle of Roman Catholic gentry in the north midlands of England. In 1570, Bavand was granted the right to present Henry Smythe to the rectory of Solihull in Warwickshire. The true patron was Robert Throckmorton of Coughton Hall in Warwickshire, a prominent Roman Catholic gentleman in that county. He too was a former member of the Middle Temple, and his daughter Anne married William Sheldon's son, Ralph Sheldon (d. 1613), who was a contemporary of Bavand's at the Temple. A previous incumbent at Solihull is noted as John Bavant, who had converted to Roman Catholicism and removed himself to Rome. A family relation seems probable.

== The Good Ordering of a Commonweal ==
Bavand's translation of The Good Ordering of a Commonweal was printed by John Kingston for John Wight very late in 1559. Bavand signed his dedication to queen Elizabeth I : ‘At the Middle Temple the 20th day of December’. The text is a close translation of the recently printed De republica bene instituenda paraenesis (1556) of Johannes Ferrarius, rector of the Protestant university of Marburg in Germany. Ferrarius is given to illustrate his points with extracts from the great Latin poets of antiquity, and Bavand translates them into English verse. His achievement was noted by Jasper Heywood in the verse preface to his translation of Seneca’s Thyestes, where Bavand is one of a group of poets at the Inns of Court whom he praises as ‘Minerva’s men’. Heywood writes : ‘There Bavand bides, that turn’d his tool, a Commonwealth to frame, | And greater grace in English gives to worthy author’s name’. The other poets mentioned by Heywood are : Thomas North (Lincoln's Inn); Thomas Sackville (Inner Temple); Thomas Norton (Inner Temple); Christopher Yelverton (Gray's Inn); William Baldwin; Thomas Blundeville (Gray's Inn); and Barnabe Googe (Staple Inn).
