= Eleanor Brooksby =

English noblewoman

- Born: c. 1560
- Died: 1625
- Noble family: Vaux (by birth); John Beaumont (maternal grandfather)
- Spouse: Edward Brooksby (m. 1577)
- Issue: 2
- Father: William Vaux, 3rd Baron Vaux of Harrowden
- Mother: Elizabeth Beaumont

Eleanor Brooksby (née Vaux, c. 1560–1625) was an English noblewoman, recusant and priest harbourer. Along with her sister Anne Vaux, she supported Roman Catholics in England during the 16th century, by providing safe houses including Baddesley Clinton in Warwickshire and Whitewebbs in Enfield Chase near London for Jesuit missionaries such as Henry Garnett.

== Family and early life ==
Brooksby was born about 1560. She was the eldest daughter and second of four children born to William Vaux, 3rd Baron Vaux of Harrowden, and his first wife, Elizabeth Vaux (née Beaumont), daughter of the judge John Beaumont of Grace Dieu, Leicester. Brooksby's mother died in 1562.

Brooksby was raised at Harrowden, where her education was influenced by the Jesuit priest Edmund Campion who was her older brother Henry Vaux's tutor. Campion was later a religious martyr who was canonised as a saint by Pope Paul VI in May 1970.

Her sister Elizabeth Vaux became a nun at Caen in Normandy.

== Issue ==
She married Edward Brookesby, Esq., of Shoby, Leicestershire, around 1577.

They had issue:

- William Brookesby (died 1606).
- Mary Brookesby (c. 1579–1628), who married Richard Thimelby Cath of Irnham, South Kesteven, Lincolnshire.
  - Brooksby's granddaughter Mary Thimelby would become an Augustinian nun and prioress at St. Monica's Convent in Louvain in Flanders.
  - Brooksby raised another of her daughter Mary's children, Edward Thimelby, who attended the seminary at the English College in Rome to prepare for entering the priesthood.

Brooksby also adopted her five-year-old first cousin and goddaughter Frances Burroughs of Burrow on the Hill. Frances was the daughter of Brooksby's paternal aunt, Maud Burroughs, who died in 1581. When she was 11 years old, Frances defended her adoptive mother against pursuivants who entered the Brooksby home searching for hidden priests. She later took vows as an Augustinian nun at St Ursula's Convent, in Louvain in Flanders.

Brooksby was widowed in the summer of 1581.

== Recusancy ==
As recusant Catholics, Brooksby and her sister Anne Vaux used their wealth to hire and provide safe houses for priests, including at Baddesley Clinton in Warwickshire and Whitewebbs in Enfield Chase near London. They regularly hosted the Jesuit missionary Henry Garnett. Brooksby's family home at Green Street, East Ham, Essex, was also the temporary location of a secret recusant printing press.

In 1605, Brookesby and her sister attended an illegal pilgrimage of Catholic recusants to Holywell. She and her sister completed the journey without shoes. The pilgrimage was later suspected by authorities of having been used as cover for planning the Gunpowder Plot, and Brooksby's sister Anne was arrested.

== Death ==
Shortly before her death, in 1625, Brooksby was convicted of recusancy and was fined £240. She did not pay the fine. Brookesby died of unknown causes in 1625.
