= Henry Garnet =

16th-century English Jesuit priest (1555–1606)

The Rev. Henry Garnet SJ
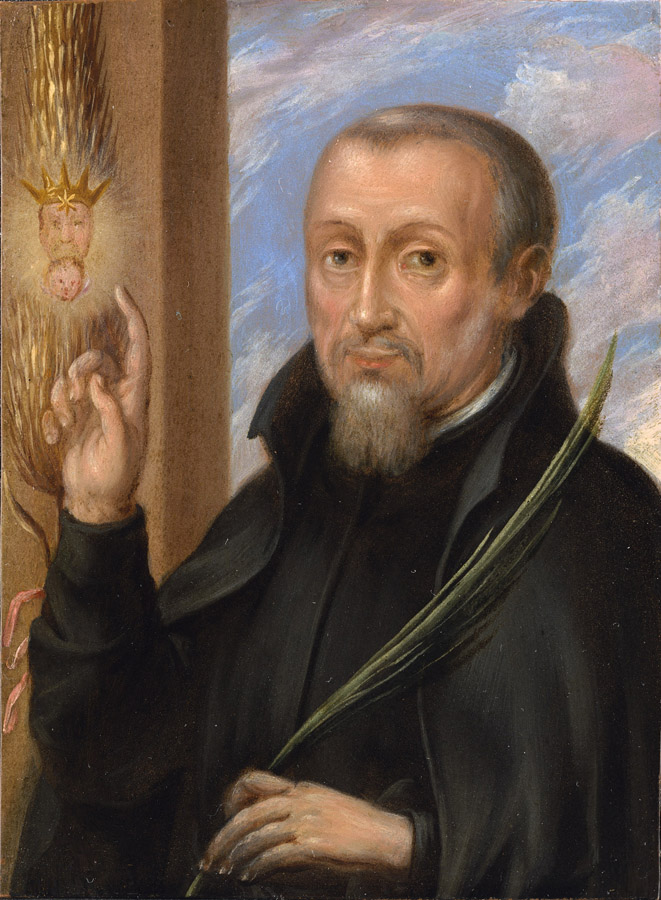
- A portrait of Garnet pointing to the bloodstained straw husk saved from the scene of his execution and said to bear his image
- Born: July 1555; Heanor, Derbyshire, England
- Died: 3 May 1606 (aged 50); St Paul's, London, England
- Cause of death: Execution
- Occupation: Jesuit superior in England
- Parent(s): Brian Garnett, Alice Jay
- Conviction: Treason
- Penalty: Hanged, drawn and quartered

Details
- Date apprehended: 27 January 1606

Henry Garnet (sometimes Garnett; July 1555 – 3 May 1606) was an English Jesuit priest executed for high treason for having had advance knowledge of the 1605 Gunpowder Plot and refusing to violate the Seal of the Confessional by notifying the authorities.

Born in Heanor, Derbyshire, he was educated in Nottingham and later at Winchester College before he moved to London in 1571 to work for a publisher. There he professed an interest in legal studies and in 1575, he travelled to the continent and joined the Society of Jesus. He was ordained in Rome some time around 1582. In 1586 Garnet returned to England as part of the Jesuit mission, soon succeeding Fr William Weston as Jesuit superior, following the latter's capture by the English authorities.

Garnet established a secret press, which lasted until late 1588, and in 1594 he interceded in the Wisbech Stirs, a dispute between secular and regular clergy. Garnet preferred nonviolent resistance to the religious persecution Catholics faced in England. He accordingly approved of the disclosure by Catholic priests of the existence of the 1603 Bye Plot, and repeatedly exhorted English Catholics not to plot violent regime change.

In the summer of 1605 Garnet met with Robert Catesby, a member of the gentry who, unknown to him, planned to assassinate the Protestant King James I. The existence of Catesby's Gunpowder Plot was revealed to Garnet by a fellow Jesuit priest, Oswald Tesimond, on 24 July 1605, but as the information was received under the seal of the confessional, canon law prevented Garnet and Tesimond from telling the authorities under penalty of immediate excommunication. Instead, Garnet pleaded with Catesby to cancel what he was plotting. Garnet also wrote to his superiors in Rome, urging them to order English Catholics not to use violence.

When the plot failed Garnet went into hiding, but he was eventually arrested on 27 January 1606. He was taken to London and interrogated by the Privy Council, whose members included John Popham, Edward Coke and Robert Cecil, 1st Earl of Salisbury. Imprisoned in the Tower of London, his conversations with fellow prisoner Edward Oldcorne were monitored by eavesdroppers, and his letters to friends such as Anne Vaux were intercepted. His conviction, announced at the end of his trial on 28 March 1606, was a foregone conclusion. Criticised for his use of equivocation, which Coke called "open and broad lying and forswearing", and condemned for not warning the authorities of what Catesby planned, he was sentenced to be hanged, drawn and quartered. He was executed on 3 May 1606.

== Early life ==
Henry Garnet (or Garnett) was born some time around July 1555 at Heanor in Derbyshire, son of Brian Garnet (or Garnett) and Alice (née Jay). He had at least five siblings: two brothers, Richard and John, and three sisters, Margaret, Eleanor and Anne, all of whom became nuns at Louvain. He was uncle to Saint Thomas Garnet SJ. Henry studied at the grammar school in Nottingham where, from 1565, his father was master. Following his election as a scholar on 24 August 1567, in 1568 he entered Winchester College, where he apparently excelled. His love of music and "rare and delightful" voice were complemented by an ability to perform songs without preparation, and he was reportedly also skilled with the lute.

Fr Thomas Stanney wrote that Garnet was "the prime scholar of Winchester College, very skilful in music and in playing upon the instruments, very modest in his countenance and in all his actions, so much that the schoolmasters and wardens offered him very great friendship, to be placed by their means in New College, Oxford."

== Rome ==
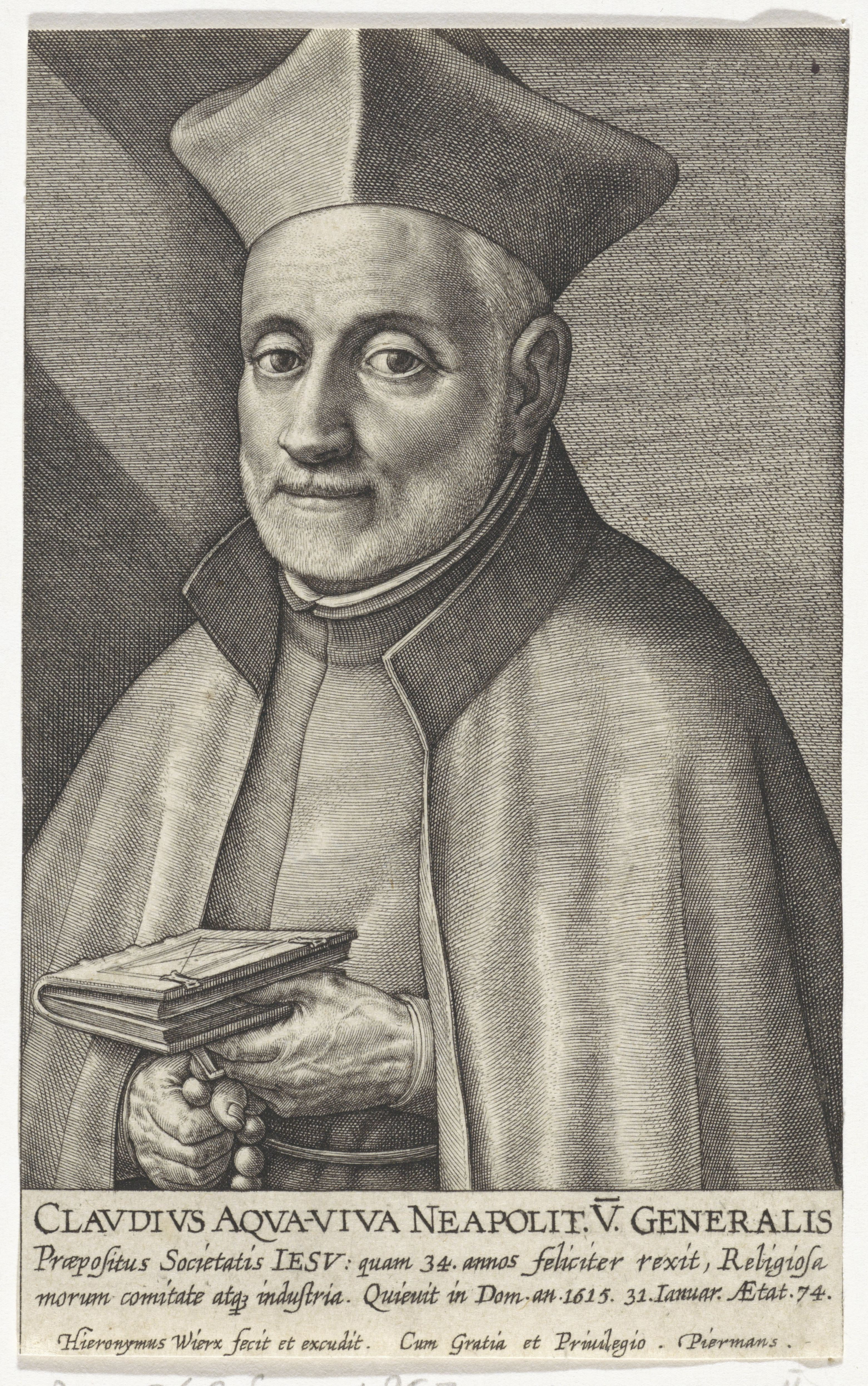
Garnet's superior in Rome, Claudio Acquaviva

Garnet did not enter New College; instead, late in 1571, he left Winchester for London. There he worked for a legal publisher, Richard Tottell, as a proof-reader and corrector. He often dined with John Popham, who as Lord Chief Justice was to preside over the trial of the Gunpowder Plotters, men whose association with Garnet would eventually prove so fateful. Although Garnet professed to Popham an interest in legal studies, in 1575 he sailed for Portugal with Giles Gallop, to enter the Society of Jesus.

The two men travelled to Rome and on 11 September 1575 were accepted into the church at Sant'Andrea della Valle. Garnet studied under the theologian Robert Bellarmine, who, together with Christopher Clavius, praised his abilities. He was ordained sometime around 1582 and stayed in Rome as a professor of Hebrew, lecturing also on metaphysics and mathematics. He was also an English confessor at St Peter's, but in May 1584 his academic career was curtailed when, perhaps as a consequence of a petition from the Jesuit superior for England William Weston,

Robert Persons asked that he be sent to England. The Superior General Claudio Acquaviva, who saw Garnet as his successor, refused this request. He thought Garnet more suited to "the quiet life" than that which awaited him in England, but on 2 May 1586 he relented and allowed him to leave. Appointed superior for the journey, Garnet travelled with Robert Southwell, leaving for Calais on 8 May. He landed near Folkestone early in July 1586.

== England ==
After meeting the Jesuit superior for England William Weston at a London inn, Garnet, Southwell and Weston travelled to Harlesford, near Marlow, Buckinghamshire. Spending just over a week at the home of Richard Bold, they engaged in prayer and masses, and also took confessions. They discussed their mission in England, deciding to meet each year in February and August (later changed to Easter and autumn). Weston also gave the two men details of Catholic houses that would shelter them.

Acquaviva had instructed that should anything happen to Weston, Garnet was to succeed him as superior in England, which he did when only days after leaving Harlesford, Weston was captured en route to London. (Note: Weston's capture came as a result of intensified persecution of Catholics, caused by the Babington Plot.) Acquaviva had also given Garnet permission to print pro-Catholic literature, and so early the next year he met Southwell in London to discuss the establishment of a secret press, which was probably located somewhere around a former Augustinian hospital near Spitalfields. It lasted until late 1588 and was responsible for A Consolatory Letter to All the Afflicted Catholikes in England, author unknown, and An Epistle of Comfort, by Southwell.

From a friend's window in Ludgate Hill, Garnet witnessed the November 1588 procession to a thanksgiving service at Old St Paul's Cathedral, celebrating the failed Spanish invasion. Spain's actions gave Garnet much cause for concern, "For when we thought that there was an end to these disasters by which we are already nearly destroyed, our hope was suddenly turned to sorrow, and now with redoubled effort the overseers are pressing upon us". People were allowed to spectate from windows only if their loyalty to Queen Elizabeth I was guaranteed by the householder. In a letter to Acquaviva, Garnet said that many of his supporters thought that he was more concerned for the Queen than her Calvinist ministers.

In light of the Armada's destruction, he also wrote to the general to ask for advice on two versions of a proposed oath to allow Roman Catholics to swear their allegiance to the Queen. The government's version required that Catholics reject the pope's authority over Elizabeth, whereas the Catholic version proposed that they recognise her authority and "would wish with every effort to struggle to thwart and to fight to the death all those who will in any way endanger the life of her Highness". The Privy Council rejected the latter.

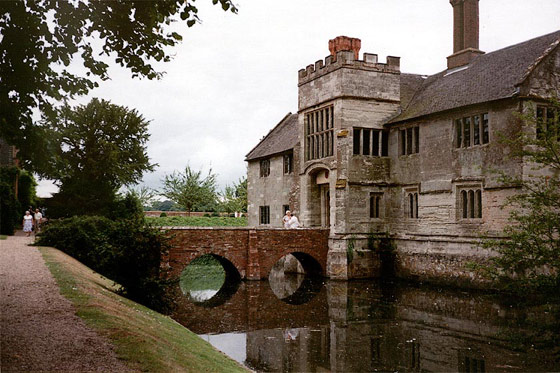
In 1591 Garnet was almost caught at Baddesley Clinton

Garnet's first few years in England were spent meeting new priests in London, including John Gerard and Edward Oldcorne. Jesuits had been banished from England since 1585, and if discovered they risked being charged with high treason. (Note: See Jesuits, etc. Act 1584) Avoiding pursuers was therefore a recurrent problem, and Garnet was almost caught on several occasions. As a result of an almost disastrous meeting at Baddesley Clinton in 1591, when he and many others were almost captured together while renewing their vows, he reorganised the mission into eleven smaller groups, each assigned two weeks annually.

Following Southwell's capture in June 1592, and the search of Anne Vaux and Eleanor Brooksby's rented house in Warwickshire, he wrote to Acquaviva to ask for an assistant who could succeed him as superior. Henry Walpole was thus dispatched, but was captured on his arrival in December 1593, and executed in York in April 1595. Garnet believed that it was his duty to observe (in disguise) the executions of his fellow priests, so as to secretly administer the last rites, and he may have been present at Southwell's execution at Tyburn in 1595. The latter's death was a significant blow for Garnet, who later wrote of the "intolerable burden of loneliness" he carried while in England.

In November 1593 Garnet travelled to the decrepit and decayed Wisbech Castle, requisitioned by the government in 1579 for the internment of Catholic priests. William Weston was held there. The castle's inhabitants were supported by Catholic alms and lived a relatively comfortable existence; Garnet was complimentary about Wisbech, calling it a "college of venerable confessors". The following year he mediated in a dispute there between secular and regular clergy (the latter represented by the Jesuits), which became known as the Wisbech Stirs. The argument was settled by the end of the year, but Garnet was concerned that reports of discontent at the Jesuit-administered English College in Rome and tension between some Catholic English exiles in Brussels might undermine his efforts to stabilise the situation. (Note: Jesuits preferred to hold to traditional Catholic values, risking death if captured, but some in Wisbech painted them as traitors. Their opponents wanted a compromise with the English government, hoping for more toleration by practising a minority form of Catholicism. They wanted an end to the Jesuit administration of continental seminaries, the removal of the Jesuits from the Catholic mission and the restoration of ordinary episcopal governance in England.The type of episcopal governance the Appellants wanted involved English Catholic bishops being granted the traditional powers of consecration and confirmation, distancing them from Rome, and advancing their cause to have Catholicism in England accepted as a minority religion.)

== Gunpowder Plot ==
=== Introduction to Catesby ===
Garnet spent much of 1604 on the move, although few details of his travels exist. At Easter he reportedly gave a Mass at Twigmoor Hall, the house of John Wright. In London, Garnet met the Spanish diplomats Juan de Tassis, 1st Count of Villamediana and Juan Fernández de Velasco y Tovar, 5th Duke of Frías. He visited Tassis two or three times, at Walsingham House and at Somerset House. He also met the French ambassador Christophe de Harlay, Count of Beaumont. In November he was with Anne Vaux (whose family he had been introduced to in summer 1586) at White Webbs near Enfield, renewing the vows given on the Feast of the Presentation of Our Lady.

On 9 June 1605, he was to be found in a room on Thames Street in London, with Robert Catesby. In the midst of what Garnet later recalled was a seemingly casual conversation, Catesby asked the priest about the morality of "killing innocents". Garnet replied according to Catholic theology, that often, during war, innocents were killed alongside the enemy. According to Antonia Fraser, Garnet may have thought that Catesby's request was to do with him possibly raising a regiment in Flanders.

Garnet was not at all like Catesby, described by Fraser as possessing the mentality "of the crusader who does not hesitate to employ the sword in the cause of values which he considers are spiritual". Catesby was also described as "exceedingly tangled in debts and barely able to subsist" In contrast, Garnet believed that "things were best settled by submission to the will of God." He was ebullient over King James I's succession to the English throne and hoped that there would be no foreign interference. Of the 1603 Bye Plot, revealed (with his blessing) to the Privy Council by two Catholic priests, he wrote that it was "a piece of impudent folly, for we know that it is by peaceful means that his Holiness and other princes are prepared to help us." He exhorted that Pope Clement VIII instruct all English Catholics not to engage in violent rebellion, "quiete et pacifice". It was a message echoed by Archpriest George Blackwell, who commanded his priests never to attempt any such thing, but it proved controversial; early in summer 1605 Garnet reported to Rome that English Catholics had reached "a stage of desperation".

The two met again in July at Fremland in Essex. Garnet told Catesby that he "wished him to look what he did if he intended anything. That he must first look to the lawfulness of the act itself, and then he must not have so little regard of Innocents that he spare not friends and necessary persons for the Commonwealth." When Catesby offered to tell the priest more, Garnet declined: "I told him what charge we all had of quietness and to procure the like in others." Garnet also spoke with William Parker, 4th Baron Monteagle, asking him "if Catholics were able to make their part good by arms against the King", but Monteagle's reply was vague. Author Alan Haynes suggests that Garnet may at that point have become marginalised.

=== Seal of the confessional ===
Garnet later claimed to have been ignorant of Catesby's designs until 24 July, when he was approached by the Jesuit priest Oswald Tesimond. "An intelligent and thoughtful man", Tesimond wanted his superior's advice as Catesby had recently told him of his plan. As Garnet viewed Tesimond's information as having been imparted under the seal of the confessional, he later claimed to have felt unable to warn anyone of Catesby's plan. According to his own account, the two had a third meeting around 24 July. He read to Catesby a letter he had received from Persons, urging him to speak to the Pope before attempting any scheme, but fearful of being discovered, Catesby declined. So Garnet wrote to Aquaviva, claiming to have prevented several outbreaks of violence, and of his suspicion that there was "a risk that some private endeavour may commit treason or use force against the King". As he had done following the failed Bye Plot, he urged the pope to publicly warn against the use of force, attempting to hide his knowledge of the plot by suggesting that the warning be aimed at recusants in Wales. He also sent Sir Edmund Baynham to deliver the same message, and when Parliament was prorogued on 28 July, Garnet satisfied himself that the danger had been averted.

On 24 August he was at White Webbs near Enfield, with Anne Vaux, her sister Eleanor Brooksby, her nephew William Brooksby and his wife Dorothy. A few days later the group set out on a pilgrimage to St Winefride's Well at Holywell in Wales. They travelled to John Grant's home at Norbrook, then Huddington Court near Worcester, through Shrewsbury, and finally to Wales. About 30 people made the journey west, including Everard Digby and his wife, and their secret chaplain Edward Oldcorne, and Nicholas Owen. On his return from Wales, Garnet travelled with Anne Vaux to Rushton Hall, home of the recently deceased Thomas Tresham (father to Francis Tresham).

From there they travelled to Digby's home at Gayhurst House in Buckinghamshire. Vaux was suspicious that so many horses were being collected at the homes of her friends and family, and confessed to Garnet her fear that "these wild heads had something in hand". She asked him to speak with Catesby, but Garnet reassured her that Catesby was instead seeking a commission in Flanders. Garnet wrote a letter of recommendation for Catesby for that very purpose. When in October Vaux raised the issue once more, claiming that several women had asked her where they should retreat to once "the brunt was passed in the beginning of Parliament", Garnet again mentioned Flanders, although Fraser suggests that Vaux's questioning must have concerned him deeply.

=== Arrest and imprisonment ===
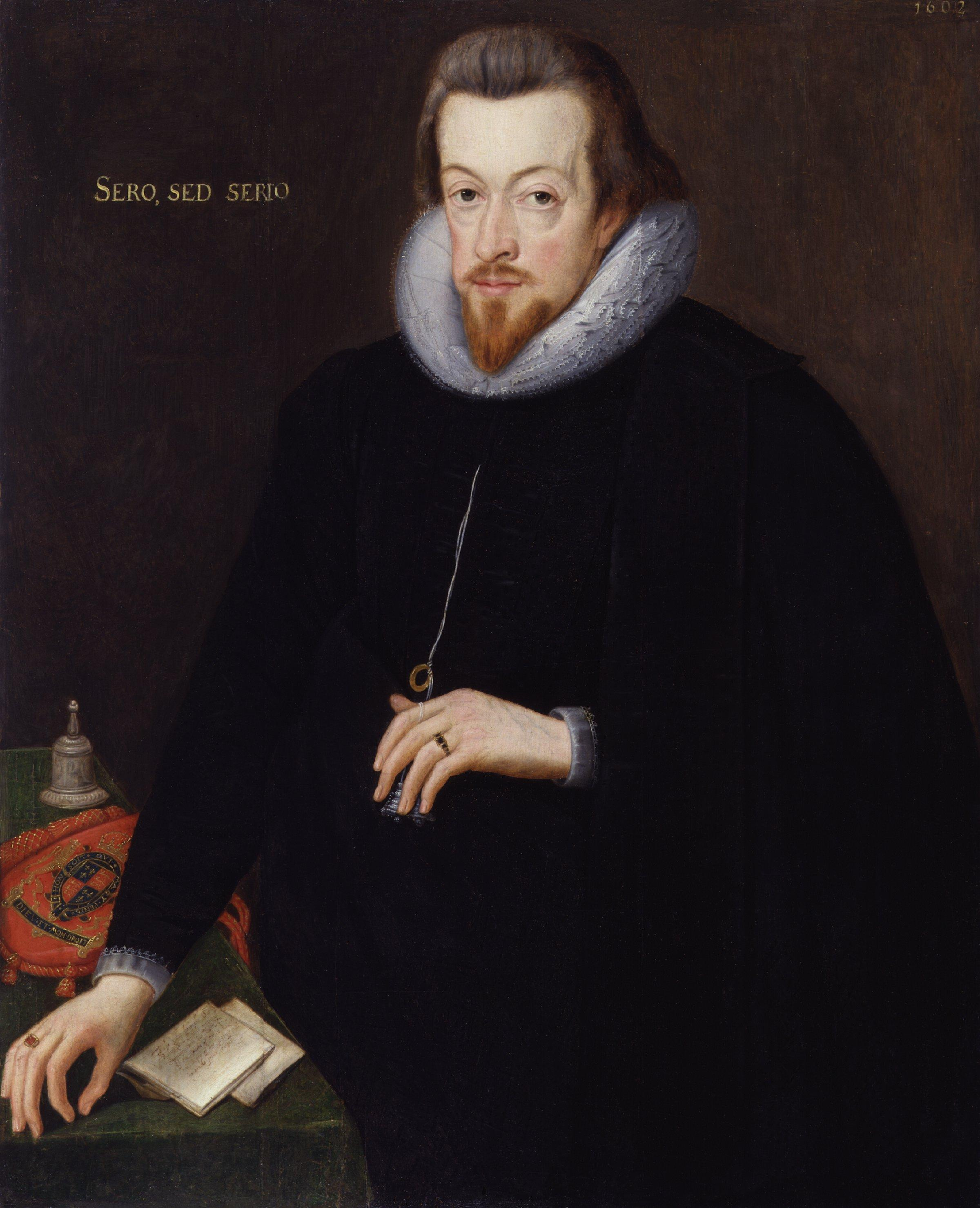
Robert Cecil, 1st Earl of Salisbury, was part of the Privy Council that interrogated Garnet.

Garnet was at Coughton Court on 6 November when Thomas Bates brought news of the plot's failure. Catesby wanted him to help raise support in Wales, where it was thought Catholic support would be more likely, but Garnet was horrified. In a letter to Catesby and Digby, he urged them to abandon their "wicked actions" and follow the pope's advice. He spent weeks on the run but was eventually arrested on 27 January 1606, at Hindlip Hall. There, for eight days, he and fellow Jesuit priest Edward Oldcorne (later beatified) had secreted themselves in a small, cramped space, unable even to stand or stretch their legs. They received sustenance from their protectors through a small drinking straw hidden within the building's structure, but with no commode or drainage they were eventually forced by "customs of nature which must of necessity be done" to emerge from hiding, and were immediately captured.

They were taken first to Holt Castle in Worcestershire, and a few days later to London. Garnet was still weak from his ordeal, and Salisbury therefore ordered that he be given a good mount; his supplies were paid for by the king. The group was accompanied by a Puritan minister who "ranted at length without interruption", but Garnet's replies remained erudite, brief and clear—much to the minister's disappointment. On his arrival in London he was taken to the Gatehouse Prison in Westminster, which was already home to many Catholic prisoners, including his nephew, Fr Thomas Garnet.

Garnet first appeared in front of the Privy Council on 13 February 1606. Present were Sir John Popham, Edward Coke, Sir William Waad, and the Earls of Worcester, Northampton, Nottingham and Salisbury. Superficially, they treated him with respect, removing their hats and addressing him as "Mr Garnet", although they made fun of his relationship with Anne Vaux, claiming he was her lover, not her confessor. During his questioning he admitted some of his movements, and that he had received Catesby's letter on 6 November, but he denied being involved in the plot, whose members he did not name.

Garnet was convinced that his captors were interested only in the failed scheme and believed he might be able to clear his name, but the councillors also asked him about the doctrine of equivocation. His own treatise on this topic, one of the "heretical, treasonable and damnable books" found amongst Francis Tresham's possessions, was laid on the council table before him. (Note: The Council may not have realised that the treatise was authored by Garnet.) Although it condemned lying, Garnet's treatise supported the notion that when questioned, for instance, on the presence of a priest in his house, a Catholic might "securely in conscience" answer "No" if he had a "secret meaning reserved in his mind". The occasions on which a Catholic might legitimately use equivocation, he supposed, were limited, but such replies could be taken as an example of insincerity or deviousness—especially to the king's council, who may not have wanted to see Garnet prove his case. The council's view of equivocation was very different from Garnet's. In their eyes, it was simple deceit.

The next day, Garnet was moved to the Tower of London, into what he described as "a very fine chamber". He was afforded claret with his meals, though it took him some time to get bedding and coal for the fireplace. He claimed that Lieutenant of the Tower William Waad treated him well, although on the subject of religion his speeches became "violent and impotent".

Garnet's recent interrogation was only the first of many. Generally, his answers were carefully considered and demonstrated a passive resistance to his questioners; the use of the rack was a distinct possibility, one which he answered with "Minare ista pueris [Such threats are only for children]". (Note: Haynes (2005) appears to have misspelt this as Minute ista pueris.) What information he did give up was of limited interest only. His jailer, a man named Carey, was employed by Waad to gain the priest's trust, offering to relay letters to his nephew in the Gatehouse Prison. Carey then placed Garnet into a cell containing a hole through which he was able to converse with Oldcorne, who was in a neighbouring cell. From "a place which was made for this precise purpose", two government eavesdroppers were therefore able to record details of conversations between the two priests.

Their communications were mostly innocent, although Garnet's admission that on one occasion he drank too much wine was later used against him, along with other incriminating evidence recorded during their stay. His communications with his nephew, and Anne Vaux, were also intercepted. Most of these letters found their intended recipient, but not before they had first been read by Waad, who also kept Salisbury informed. Although Garnet told Vaux that the council's evidence constituted nothing but "presumptions", insufficient for a state trial, early in March he confessed, possibly as a result of torture. Vaux too was arrested and interrogated twice, just as further questions were being asked of Garnet by the council and the king, the latter of whom was interested in his opinion on theological matters.

Despite his claims to have been horrified by Catesby's plan, his declaration, which admitted that he had "dealt very reservedly with your Lordships in the case of the late powder action", gave the government proof that he had prior knowledge of the plot, and in their view, he was therefore guilty of misprision of treason.

=== Trial ===
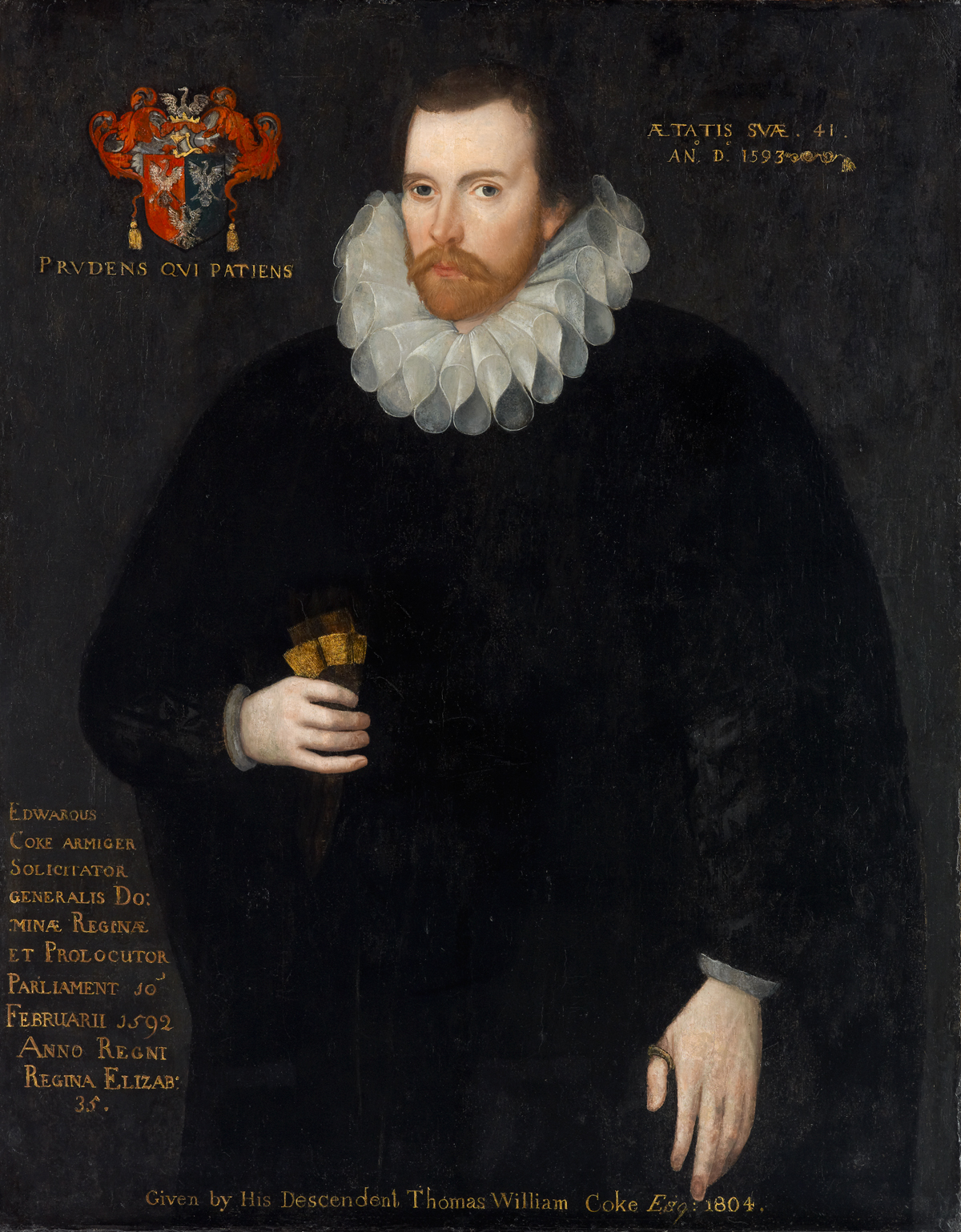
Sir Edward Coke accused Garnet of involvement in every treason since 1586.

Garnet's trial took place on Friday 28 March 1606. He was taken to the Guildhall by closed coach; an unusual method, considering prisoners were usually walked to trial, though the authorities may have had some concern about support from a sympathetic crowd. The trial began at about 9:30 am and lasted all day. In attendance were King James (hidden from public view) and several courtiers including Lady Arbella Stuart and Catherine Howard, Countess of Suffolk. Garnet was introduced with his various aliases, which included "Whalley, otherwise Darcy, otherwise Roberts, otherwise Farmer, otherwise Philips". He was accused of having conspired with Catesby on 9 June 1605 to kill the king and his son, and to "alter and subvert the government of the kingdom and the true worship of God established in England". He was also accused of having conspired with several others to blow up the House of Lords with gunpowder. He pleaded "not guilty".

Speaking for the government, Edward Coke accused him of involvement in every treason since 1586, the year he returned to England. According to Coke, the provincial superior was involved in the Main and Bye Plots of 1603. He had sent Edmund Baynham to Rome to gain papal approval for the 1605 plot, and while at Coughton in November, had prayed "for the success of the great action". Coke called Garnet "a doctor of five Ds, namely, of dissimulation, of deposing of princes, of disposing of kingdoms, of daunting and deterring of subjects, and of destruction". His supposed inappropriate relationship with Anne Vaux was mentioned, but his adherence to the doctrine of equivocation proved extremely damaging.

Francis Tresham's deathbed letter, which claimed that Garnet had played no part in the so-called Spanish Treason, (Note: Perhaps thinking that the purpose behind his intended visit to Catholic Spain was to gain financial support for impoverished English Catholics, in 1602 Garnet had sent Thomas Wintour to see Superior Father Joseph Creswell, who made the introductions to the Spanish.) was read aloud. Tresham claimed not to have seen Garnet "for fifteen or sixteen years before", despite government evidence that the two had met more recently. Garnet had not seen the letter and did not know that it referred to events before 1602, not 1605. He was unable to explain it, except by saying "it may be, my Lord, that he meant to equivocate."

Statements regarding Jesuit-encouraged plots against Queen Elizabeth were read to the court, as well as some of the plotters' confessions. Garnet defended his use of equivocation with his own treatise on the doctrine. He had denied his conversation with Oldcorne as it was a secret, but said that in matters of faith, equivocation could never be lawful. When asked by Salisbury what he would do if the pope excommunicated King James, he "denied to answer". His defence of equivocation was scorned by Coke, who called it "open and broad lying and forswearing".

As for Tesimond's confession, the planned assassination had not at that point happened and so Salisbury said that Garnet could easily have alerted the government. Salisbury attacked the idea that it had ever been made under the seal of the confessional, and claimed anyway that Garnet could have warned the authorities after his more ordinary conversation with Catesby about the death of innocents; the priest replied by saying that at the time, he did not understand the relevance of Catesby's questions. The Earl of Northampton said, in Latin, "quod non-prohibet cum potest, jubet" (what a man does not forbid when he can, he orders). Garnet's defence, that he had forbidden Catesby from proceeding, was futile.

The jury took fifteen minutes to decide that Garnet was guilty of treason. He was sentenced to be hanged, drawn and quartered.

=== Execution ===
The day after his trial Garnet made a new statement, which he hoped would clarify his dealings with Tresham. He also wrote to the king, reiterating his stance on violence against a rightful monarch. When the government lied and told him they had captured Tesimond, he wrote an apologetic letter to the priest regarding the nature of their conversation the previous year. He also wrote a final letter to Anne Vaux, on 21 April, relating his lack of fortune over the previous few months.

After about three months spent in the Tower, on Saturday 3 May 1606 Garnet was strapped to a wooden hurdle and taken by three horses to the churchyard of St Paul's. He wore a black cloak over his clothes and hat, and spent much of the journey with his hands together and eyes closed. Present in the churchyard were the Sheriff of London, Sir Henry Montague, George Abbot, and John Overall, the Dean of St Paul's. When asked if he had knowledge of any further treasons, Garnet replied that he had nothing to say.

He rejected any entreatments to abandon his faith for Protestantism, and said that he had committed no offence against the king. The only thing he thought he might be condemned for was for abiding by the terms of the confessional, and if by that action he had offended the king or state, he asked for forgiveness. The recorder announced that this was an admission of guilt, but Garnet reiterated his not guilty plea and continued to argue the point.

Garnet highlighted the date of his execution, 3 May, the Feast of the Cross, and reaffirmed his innocence. He defended Anne Vaux against claims that their relationship had been inappropriate. He then prayed at the base of the ladder, disrobed down to his long, sewn-up shirt, "that the wind might not blow it up", and mounted the ladder. He ignored a Protestant minister who came forward, replying to an objectionable member of the audience that he "ever meant to die a true but perfect Catholic". Dean Overall protested that "we are all Catholics", although Garnet disagreed with this.

He once again said his prayers, and was then thrown off the ladder. Before the executioner could cut him down alive, many in the crowd pulled on his legs, and as a result, Garnet did not suffer the remainder of his grim sentence. (Note: Haynes disagrees with Fraser and says that at the King's command, Garnet was left to hang until he died.) There was no applause when the executioner held Garnet's heart aloft and said the traditional words, "Behold the heart of a traitor". His head was set on a pole on London Bridge, but crowds of onlookers fascinated by its fresh and unblemished appearance eventually forced the government to turn the head upward, so its face was no longer visible.

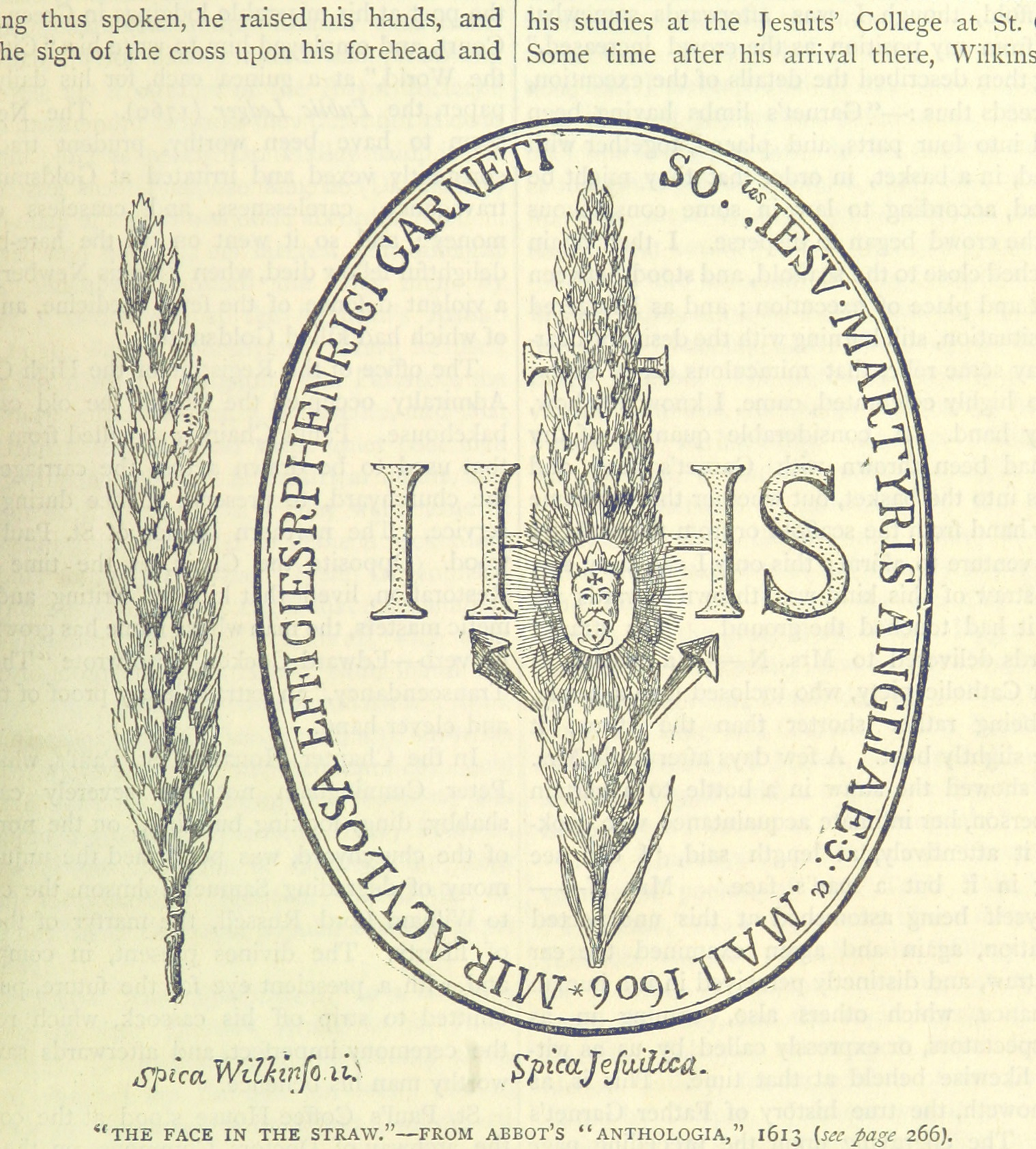
The Face in the Straw, from Abbot's Anthologia, 1613. Also to be seen in Garnet's portrait.

A bloodstained straw husk saved from the scene of the execution and said to bear Garnet's image became an object of curiosity. It was smuggled out of the country into the possession of the Society of Jesus, before being lost during the French Revolution. Another relic from Garnet's role in the Gunpowder Plot is an account of the treasonous activities and subsequent trials titled A True and Perfect Relation of the Whole Proceedings Against the Late Most Barbarous Traitors, Garnet a Jesuit and His Confederates, at least one copy of which is believed to have been bound in Garnet's skin, though this instance of anthropodermic bibliopegy has not been confirmed.

== Writings ==
Garnet's writings include An Apology Against the Defence of Schisme (1593), an attack against church papistry in which he scolded Thomas Bell for supporting the occasional taking of Communion in the Church of England. This was followed by A Treatise of Christian Renunciation (1593), which comprised a selection of quotations on what Catholics should be prepared to renounce for their faith, and The Societie of the Rosary (1593–1594)

His defence of the practice of equivocation was published in A Treatise against lying and fraudulent dissimulation (c. 1598), originally titled A Treatise of Equivocation. Equivocation was condemned by most of his Protestant contemporaries as outright lying. Even William Shakespeare may have alluded to Garnet in Macbeth with the following line: "who committed treason enough for God's sake, yet could not equivocate to heaven", although Shakespeare's personal views on equivocation are unknown.

Catholic Church titles
Preceded by William Weston	Vice-Prefect of the English Mission of the Society of Jesus residing in England; 1587–1606	Succeeded by Richard Holtby
