= William Weston (Jesuit) =

English Jesuit missionary priest

- Portrait of Father William Weston in the Royal English College in Valladolid
- Born: 1550; Maidstone
- Died: Valladolid
- Occupations: Missionary, Catholic theologian

William Weston, SJ (c. 1551 – 9 June 1615) was an English Jesuit missionary priest. He was appointed superior of the Jesuits on the English Mission.

== Life ==
Educated at Oxford, 1564-1569 (?), and afterwards at Paris and Douai (1572–1575), he went thence on foot to Rome and entered the Society of Jesus, 5 November 1575, leaving all he possessed to Douai College. His novitiate was made in Spain, and there he worked and taught until appointed as vice-prefect or superior of the English mission.

There was not then a single Jesuit at liberty in the country. He reached England, on 20 September 1584, receiving into the Catholic Church Philip Howard, Earl of Arundel. Weston left an autobiography full of the missionary adventures. One salient feature was the practice of exorcisms, at which a number of other priests assisted. The first to object to these witchcraft proceedings were the older priests, but eventually the matter caught the attention of the Anglican authorities, and the exorcists, almost to a man, were arrested and imprisoned, Weston amongst them (August, 1586). Many were executed.

In 1588, the Government moved Weston and a number of other priests to Wisbech Castle, where for four years their confinement was strict. But in 1592 the prisoners were, for economy's sake, allowed to live on the alms supplied by Catholics, and freedom of conversation was permitted. The Catholic faithful came to visit the confessors, who on their part arranged to live a sort of college life. This was not accomplished without much friction, in what became called the "Wisbech Stirs". The majority with Weston (20 out of 33) desired regular routine with a recognized authority to judge delinquencies, e.g. quarrels and possible scandals. The minority dissented, and when the majority persisted, and even dined apart (February, 1595), a cry of schism was raised, and Weston was denounced as its originator, the pugnacious Christopher Bagshaw taking the lead against him. In response, Weston decided to keep to his room and cease taking meals with the rest of the prisoners stating that he was unwilling to participate in any common life unless rules were drawn up to regulate it. In May, arbitrators (John Bavant and Alban Dolman) were called in, but without result, as one espoused one side, one the other. In October two more arbitrators, John Mush and Dudley, were summoned, and they arranged a compromise amid general rejoicings. The whole body agreed to live together by a definite rule (November, 1595).

In the spring of 1597, the troubles of the English College, Rome, spread to England, and led to a renewal of the "Wisbech stirs", which were soon overshadowed by the Appellant controversy. Weston took no part in this, as he was committed, early in 1599, to the Tower of London, where he almost lost his sight.

In 1603, he was sent into exile and spent the rest of his days in the English seminaries at Seville and Valladolid. He was rector of the latter college at the time of his death. His autobiography and letters show a man learned, scholarly, and intensely spiritual, if somewhat narrow. A zealous missionary, he strongly attracted many souls, while some found him unconciliatory. Portraits of him are preserved at Rome and Valladolid.

Catholic Church titles
Preceded by Jasper Heywood	Vice-Prefect of the English Mission of the Society of Jesus residing in England; 1584–1586	Succeeded by Henry Garnet
