= Baron Vaux of Harrowden =

Title in the Peerage of England

Barony Vaux of Harrowden
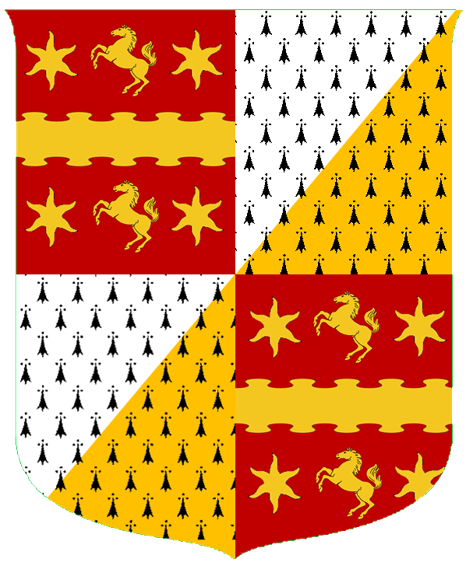
- Armorial Blazon: Arms: Quarterly: 1st and 4th, Gules a Fess nebuly Or in chief a Horse rampant between two Estoiles and the like in base all of the last (Gilbey); 2nd and 3rd, Per bend sinister Ermine and Erminois a Lion rampant Or (Mostyn); Crest: In front of a Tower proper issuant from the battlements thereof a Dragon's Head Gules a Fleur-de-lis Or all between two Ostrich Feathers Argent.; Supporters: Dexter: A Griffin Sable beaked Or the forelegs Gold; Sinister: A Buck Or, each supporter gorged with a Torse Argent and Gules pendant therefrom by a Ring Gold an Escutcheon of the Arms of Vaux (checky Or and Gules on a Chevron Azure three Roses Gold)
- Creation date: 1523
- Created by: Henry VIII
- Peerage: Peerage of England
- First holder: Nicholas Vaux
- Present holder: Richard Gilbey
- Heir apparent: Alexander John Charles Gilbey
- Remainder to: 1st baron's heirs general
- Seat: Rusko Estate
- Former seat: Great Harrowden Hall
- Motto: Hodie Non Cras (Today, not tomorrow)

Baron Vaux of Harrowden (/ˈvɔːks/ VAWKS) is a title in the Peerage of England. It was created in 1523 for Sir Nicholas Vaux. The barony was created by writ, which means that it can pass through both male and female lines. Vaux was succeeded by his son, the second Baron. He was a poet and member of the courts of Henry VIII and Edward VI. The Vaux family was related to Queen Consort Katherine Parr by the first baron's two wives; Elizabeth FitzHugh and Anne Green (sister to Lady Maud Parr). On the death in 1663 of his great-grandson, the fifth Baron, the title fell into abeyance between the late Baron's surviving sister Joyce, and the heirs of his deceased sisters Mary, Lady Symeon, and Catherine, Baroness Abergavenny.

The Vaux family owned Great Harrowden Hall until 1695 when they sold it to Thomas Watson-Wentworth, of Rockingham Castle, the hall was rebuilt in 1719.

The barony remained in abeyance for 175 years, until the abeyance was terminated in 1838 in favour of George Charles Mostyn, who became the sixth Baron. He was the son of Mary Lucinda Browne-Mostyn, a descendant of Mary, the eldest sister of the fifth Baron, by her marriage to Charles Mostyn, grandson of Sir Edward Mostyn, 5th Baronet (see Mostyn Baronets, of Talacre). He was succeeded by his grandson, the seventh Baron. He was in the Diplomatic Service. The seventh Baron Vaux was able to buy back the hall. On his death in 1935 the title fell into abeyance between his three daughters, the Hon. Grace Mary Eleanor Gilby, the Hon. Gladys Flora Charleton and the Hon. Dorothy Alice Mostyn.

The abeyance was terminated in 1938 in favour of the eldest daughter, Grace, the eighth Baroness and so far the only woman to hold the barony. She was the wife of William Gordon Gilbey, the owner of a wine and spirits group. Grace was succeeded by her eldest son, Peter Hubert Gordon Gilbey (Father Gabriel Gilbey), the ninth Baron. He was a monk at Ampleforth Abbey. Lord Vaux of Harrowden took his seat in the House of Lords in 1962 and thereby became the first Benedictine monk to do so since 1559. On his death the title passed to his younger brother, the tenth Baron. As of 2017 the title is held by the latter's grandson, the twelfth Baron, who succeeded his father in 2014 and was elected to the House of Lords in 2017.

The family seat is Rusko Estate, near Gatehouse of Fleet, Kirkcudbrightshire.

== Barons Vaux of Harrowden (1523) ==
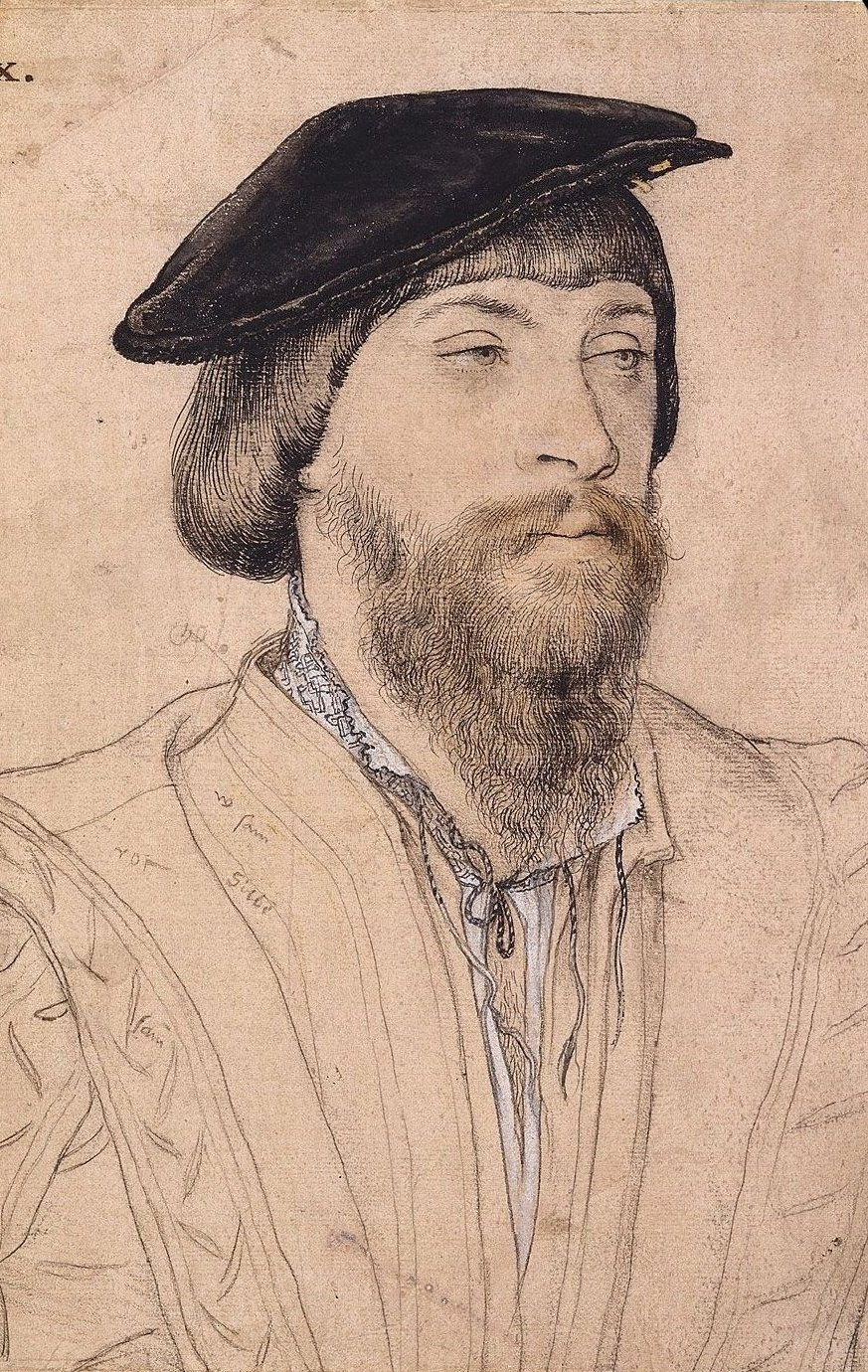
Thomas Vaux, 2nd Baron Vaux of Harrowden

- Nicholas Vaux, 1st Baron Vaux of Harrowden (c. 1460–1523)
- Thomas Vaux, 2nd Baron Vaux of Harrowden (1509–1556)
- William Vaux, 3rd Baron Vaux of Harrowden (1535–1595)
- Edward Vaux, 4th Baron Vaux of Harrowden (1588–1661)
- Henry Vaux, 5th Baron Vaux of Harrowden (1591–1663) (abeyant 1663)
- George Charles Mostyn, 6th Baron Vaux of Harrowden (1804–1883) (abeyance terminated 1838)
- Hubert George Charles Mostyn, 7th Baron Vaux of Harrowden (1860–1935) (abeyant 1935)
- Grace Mary Eleanor Gilbey, 8th Baroness Vaux of Harrowden (1887–1958) (abeyance terminated 1938)
- Peter Hubert Gordon Gilbey, 9th Baron Vaux of Harrowden (1914–1977)
- John Hugh Philip Gilbey, 10th Baron Vaux of Harrowden (1915–2002)
- Anthony William Gilbey, 11th Baron Vaux of Harrowden (1940–2014)
- Richard Hubert Gordon Gilbey, 12th Baron Vaux of Harrowden (b. 1965)

The heir apparent is the present holder's son, the Hon. Alexander John Charles Gilbey (b. 2000).

== See also ==
- Mostyn Baronets, of Talacre

== Sources ==
- Kidd, Charles, ed. (1903). Debrett's peerage, baronetage, knightage, and companionage. London: Dean and son. p. 864.
- Leigh Rayment's Peerage Pages
- Wellingborough Golf Club,
