= John Feckenham =

Abbot of Westminster

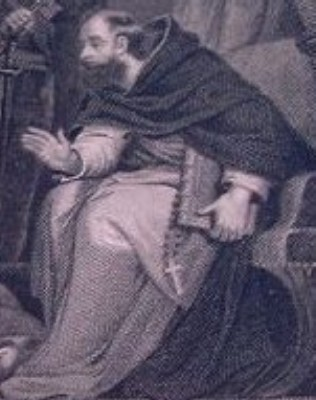
- Detail of Lady Jane Grey and Feckenham – Artist likely Northcote and Engraved by J. Rogers
- Born: c. 1515; Feckenham Forest, Worcestershire
- Died: October 1584; Wisbech
- Education: Gloucester Hall, Oxford

Ecclesiastical career
- Church: Roman Catholic
- Offices held: Rector of Finchley, Rector of Solihull, Dean of St Paul's, Last Abbot of Westminster Mary I's Chaplain and Confessor

John Feckenham O.S.B. (c. 1515 – October 1584), also known as John Howman of Feckingham and later John de Feckenham or John Fecknam, was an English churchman, the last abbot of Westminster.

== Under Henry VIII and Edward VI ==
Feckenham was born at Feckenham, Worcestershire, into a family of substantial yeomen. The family name was Howman, but as a monk he chose to be known by the name of his place of origin. Thomas Fuller notes in Worthies of England that Feckenham was the last clergyman to be "locally surnamed". His early education came from the parish priest, but he was sent at an early age to the cloister school at Evesham Abbey, and from there, at age eighteen, to Gloucester Hall, Oxford, as a Benedictine student. After taking his degree in arts, he returned to Evesham Abbey, and took monastic vows. In 1537 he went back to Oxford and took his degree of Bachelor of Divinity on 11 June 1539. He was at Evesham at the time the abbey was surrendered on 27 January 1540 in the dissolution of the monasteries. Then, with a pension of £10 a year, he went back to Oxford. Soon afterwards he became chaplain to John Bell Bishop of Worcester and then served Edmund Bonner, Bishop of London, in the same capacity from 1543 to 1549. In 1544 Bonner gave him the position of rector of Solihull.

Feckenham established a reputation as a preacher and a disputant of keen intellect but unvarying charity. After Bonner was deprived of his see, in about 1549, Thomas Cranmer sent Feckenham to the Tower of London, and while there learning and eloquence made him such a successful advocate that he was temporarily freed ("borrowed out of prison") to take part in seven public disputations against John Hooper, John Jewel and others.

== Under Mary I ==
Released by Queen Mary I on her accession in 1553, he returned to Bonner's service, became a prebendary of St Paul's, rector of Finchley, then of Greenford Magna, chaplain and confessor to the Queen, and then Dean of St Paul's (10 March 1554). He took part in the Oxford disputes against Cranmer, Hugh Latimer and Nicholas Ridley; but he was ill at ease with the brutality of some measures put in force against the Church of England. Feckenham employed his influence with Mary "to procure pardon of the faults or mitigation of the punishment for poor Protestants". He was sent by the Queen to prepare Lady Jane Grey for death and when her half-sister, Elizabeth, was sent to the Tower on 18 March 1554, Feckenham interceded for her life and liberty, even at the cost of displeasing the Queen.

In May 1556, the degree of Doctor of Divinity was conferred on him by the University of Oxford, and when Westminster Abbey was revived, Feckenham was appointed abbot. Under his guidance traditional monastic life began again on 21 November 1556, Westminster School was reopened and the shrine of St Edward the Confessor was restored.

== Under Elizabeth I ==
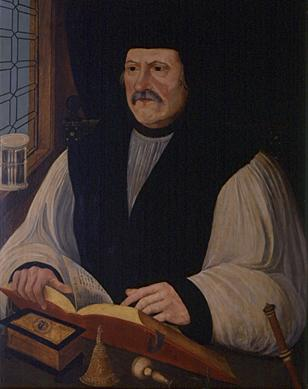
Matthew Parker, the Archbishop of Canterbury who had Feckenham sent to the Tower of London

The story that Queen Elizabeth I sent for Feckenham and offered him the archbishopric of Canterbury, and offered to let the abbot and his monks stay at Westminster if they conformed to the Church of England has no contemporary source. Feckenham sat in Elizabeth's first parliament, and was the last mitred abbot to do so. He consistently opposed all the legislation for changes in religion, and he refused the Oath of Supremacy. The abbey was dissolved again on 12 July 1559, and within a year Feckenham was sent by Archbishop Matthew Parker to the Tower (20 May 1560), according to Jewel, "for having obstinately refused attendance on public worship and everywhere declaiming and railing against that religion which we now profess."

Except for some brief periods when he was a prisoner at large, Feckenham spent the rest of his life in confinement either in some recognized prison, or in the keeping of the bishops of Winchester and Ely. After fourteen years' confinement, he was released on bail and lived in Holborn, where his benevolence was shown by all manner of works of charity. "He relieved the poor wheresoever he came, so that flies flock not thicker to spilt honey than beggars constantly crowd about him". He set up a public aqueduct in Holborn, and a hospice for the poor at Bath; he distributed every day to the sick the milk of twelve cows, took care of orphans, and encouraged sports on Sundays among the youth of London by giving prizes.

In 1577 he was committed to the care of Richard Cox, bishop of Ely, with strict instructions as to his treatment. Cox could find no fault with him except that "he was a gentle person but in the popish religion too, too obstinate." In 1580 he was moved to Wisbech Castle, and there exercised a good influence among his fellow-prisoners; this was remembered when, in later years, the Wisbech Stirs broke out. Here, at his own cost, he repaired the road and set up a market cross in the town. Twenty-four years after the death of Queen Mary, he died in prison and was buried in the St Peter and St Paul's Church, Wisbech, Isle of Ely on 10 October 1584.

== Published work ==
John Feckenham's surviving published works include:

- (London 1554) A Conference Dialoguewise held between the Lady Jane Dudley and Master J. F. ... touching the faith and belief of the sacrament and her religion,
- (London 1555) Two Homilies on the first, second, and third Articles of the Creed
- (London 1555) A notable Sermon at the Exequies of Joan, Queen of Spain
- (London 1559) The Oration of Dr. F. made in the Parliament House
- (London 1566) The Declaration of such Scruples and Stays of Conscience touching the Oath of Supremacy
- (London 1570) Objections or Assertions made against Mr. John Gough’s Sermon preached in the Tower of London
- (1576) Rules to be Observed at the Bathe

== Depiction in media ==
Feckenham was played by the actor Michael Hordern in the 1986 historical drama Lady Jane. Feckenham's scenes in the film depict his friendship with Lady Jane Grey.
