= Thomas Garnet =

English Roman Catholic saint

Saint Thomas Garnet S.J.
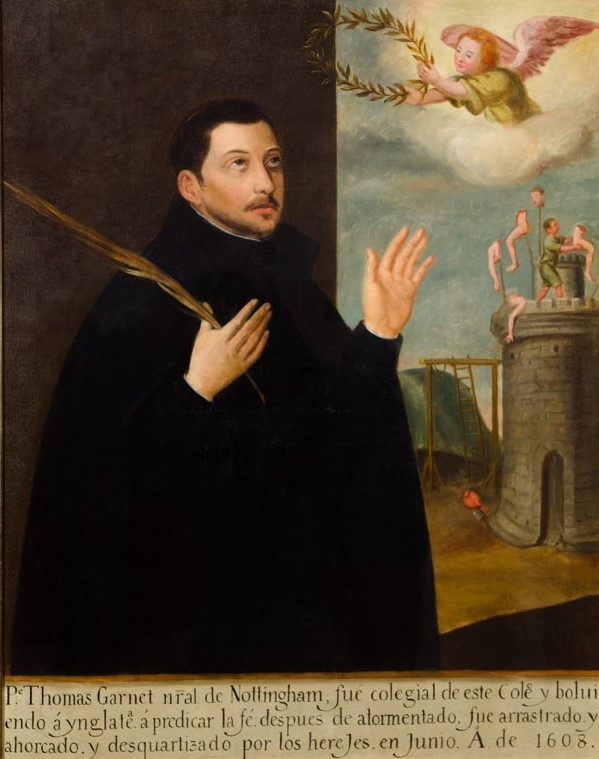
- Portrait from the Royal English College in Valladolid

Priest and Martyr
- Born: 9 November 1575; Southwark, Central London, England
- Died: 23 June 1608 (aged 32); Tyburn, Middlesex, England
- Venerated in: Roman Catholic Church
- Beatified: 15 December 1929 by Pope Pius XI
- Canonized: 25 October 1970 by Pope Paul VI
- Feast: 23 June (individual); 25 October (with Forty Martyrs of England and Wales)
- Attributes: Martyr's palm

Thomas Garnet, SJ (9 November 1575 – 23 June 1608) was an English Jesuit priest who was executed in London during the English Reformation. He is the protomartyr (i.e., the first martyr associated with a place) of Saint Omer and of Stonyhurst College. He was executed at Tyburn and is one of the Forty Martyrs of England and Wales.

== Early life and education ==
Thomas Garnet was born into a prominent family in Southwark. His uncle, Henry Garnet, was the superior of the Jesuits in England. Richard Garnet, Thomas's father, was at Balliol College, Oxford, at the time when great severity began to be used against Catholics. His example provided leadership to a generation of Oxford men which was to produce Edmund Campion, Robert Persons, and other English Catholics.

Thomas attended Collyer's School in Horsham, Sussex, and was afterwards a page to one of the half-brothers of Philip Howard, Earl of Arundel, who were, however, conformists (i.e. conformed to the Anglican faith).

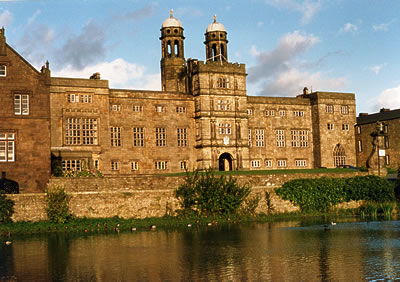
St. Omer – Stonyhurst College

Because English colleges had been turned over to Protestants, English Catholics had an incentive to go to the continent for their education. Thomas, at age 17, was amongst the first students of Saint Omer's Jesuit College (at Stonyhurst since 1794) in 1593. By 1595 he was considered fit for Saint Albans, the new English seminary at Valladolid. In January he set out from Calais with five others from Calais, John Copley, William Worthington, John Ivreson, James Thomson, and Henry Mompesson.

== Captured in the Channel ==
They were lucky in finding as a travelling companion a Jesuit Father William Baldwin, who was going to Spain in disguise under the alias Ottavio Fuscinelli, but misfortunes soon began. After severe weather in the English Channel, they found themselves obliged to run for shelter to The Downs, where their vessel was searched by men from some of Queen Elizabeth's ships, and they were discovered hiding in the hold. They were immediately made prisoners and treated very roughly. They were sent round the Nore up to London, and were examined by Charles, second Lord Howard of Effingham, the Lord High Admiral.

== Father Baldwin's test ==
After this Baldwin was sent to Bridewell prison, where one of those incidents occurred that were so representative of the treacherousness of the Elizabethan age. He met a confessor named James Atkinson who, under torture, had divulged names. He was riven by remorse and terror that he would be tortured again, this time to death and would die unabsolved for his betrayals.

This placed Baldwin in a real quandary. Was Atkinson a spy? In appealing for a priest to hear his confession was he angling to trick Baldwin into revealing himself as a priest? In the end he heard Atkinson's confession, whose joy at absolution was luminous. Later, Atkinson would suffer further tortures from which he died.

== Escapes ==
Meantime his young companions had been handed over to Archbishop Whitgift, the Archbishop of Canterbury, who, having found that they encouraged one another, sent them one by one to different Protestant bishops or doctors.

Only the youngest, Mompesson, conformed. The rest eventually escaped and returned to their colleges on the continent after many adventures. It is not known for certain what happened to young Garnet, but it seems likely that he was the youth confined to the house of Richard Edes. He fell ill and was sent home under bond to return to custody at Oxford by a certain day.

The boy escaped yet again, and to avoid trouble he had then to keep away even from his own father. At last, he reached Saint Omer again, and then went to Valladolid in 1596, after many escapades.

== Return to the dangers of England ==
After ordination, in 1599, age 24, "returning to England, I wandered", he says, "from place to place, to reduce souls which went astray and were in error as to the knowledge of the true Catholic Church".

During the excitement caused by the Gunpowder Plot in 1605 he was arrested near Warwick while going under the name Thomas Rokewood, which he had no doubt assumed from Ambrose Rokewood of Coldham Hall, whose chaplain he then was, and who had, unfortunately, been implicated in the plot.

== Imprisonment ==
Garnet was now imprisoned first in the Gatehouse, then in the Tower, where he was tortured in order to make him give evidence against Henry Garnet, his famous uncle, superior of the English Jesuits, who had recently admitted him into the Society of Jesus. The authorities suspected that Henry Garnet was implicated in the plot, for which suspicion he was later executed.

Though no connection with the conspiracy could be proved against Thomas, he was kept in the Tower of London for seven months, at the end of which time he was suddenly put on board ship with forty-six other priests, and a royal proclamation, dated 10 July 1606, was read to them, threatening death if they returned. They were then carried across the Channel and set ashore in Flanders.

== Return to the Continent, Return to England and martyrdom ==
Garnet now went to his old school at Saint Omer, then to Brussels to see the superior of the Jesuits, Baldwin, his companion in the adventures of 1595. Father Baldwin sent him to the English Jesuit novitiate, Saint John's, Leuven, in which he was the first novice to be received.

In September 1607, he was sent back to England, but was arrested six weeks later by an apostate priest called Rouse. This was the time of King James' controversy with Cardinal Bellarmine about the Oath of Allegiance. Garnet was offered his life if he would take the oath, but he steadfastly refused, and was executed at Tyburn at the age of 32, protesting that he was "the happiest man this day alive". His relics, which were preserved at Saint Omer, were lost during the French Revolution. St. Thomas Garnet's Independent School in Boscombe, Bournemouth, which closed in 2020, was dedicated to the saint at its foundation.

== Bibliography ==
- Pollen, "Protomartyr of Stonyhurst College" in Stonyhurst Magazine (1889), 334-82
- Blackfan, Annales Coll. S. Albani, Vallesoleti, ed. POLLEN (1899), 57, 84
- CAmm in The Month (Aug., 1898), 164-77
- Yepez, Persecucion de Inglaterra (Madrid, 1599), 820-30
- Henry Foley, Records of the English Province of the Society of Jesus, II, 475–505.

== Notes ==
1. Also spelled Robert Parsons

Attribution
