= Edward Vaux, 4th Baron Vaux of Harrowden =

English peer

Edward Vaux, 4th Baron Vaux of Harrowden (13 September 1588 – 8 September 1661) was an English peer. He was the son of George Vaux (1564–1594) and his wife Elizabeth Roper (daughter of John Roper, 1st Baron Teynham, born about 1564), and the grandson and heir of William Vaux, 3rd Baron Vaux of Harrowden. He succeeded his grandfather as Baron Vaux of Harrowden in August 1595, just before his seventh birthday.

== Early life and religion ==
The Vaux and Roper families were Catholics, and the third Baron Vaux was convicted of recusancy several times during the reign of Elizabeth I. As a minor heir to a barony, Edward Vaux became a ward of the queen on his grandfather's death. His widowed mother, known as the "Dowager of Harrowden" or (incorrectly, as her husband was never Lord Vaux) as the "Dowager Lady Vaux", devastated by the loss of her beloved husband, vowed to never remarry and devoted the rest of her life to religion. During a remodelling of the family estate at Great Harrowden in young Edward's name, she incorporated hidden rooms for the harbouring of Catholic priests including her confessor, the dashing Jesuit John Gerard. Her activities were closely watched by the authorities, and both Edward and his mother were investigated in the aftermath of the Gunpowder Plot of 1605. Edward felt it prudent to go abroad for some years.

He returned to England in 1611, apparently to intercede for his mother, who had been arrested for recusancy. For refusing to take the 1606 Oath of Allegiance to James I, entailing a denial of the pope's authority over the king, Edward was committed to the Fleet prison. He was sentenced in the Kings Bench to perpetual imprisonment and loss of property on 1 March 1612, but he was transferred to the custody of the Dean of Westminster and had a grant of his forfeited lands in October 1612. He had already saved some of the family estates by conveying them in trust to five of his Protestant neighbours, even though such a transaction was strictly forbidden by law. He was later released on surety of £1000.

== Military career ==
On 3 January 1621, Vaux was summoned to the Parliament which James reluctantly called to raise funds for the military assistance of his son-in-law Frederick V, Elector Palatine. When Parliament instead demanded abandonment of the planned Spanish Match for Charles, Prince of Wales and war with Spain, James dissolved Parliament and pursued the Spanish bride for his son with renewed vigor. The king supported a request by the Spanish ambassador to allow volunteers to be recruited for service in the Spanish Army of Flanders, which relied heavily on foreign mercenaries, and suspended the statute that required volunteers in foreign service to take the Oath of Allegiance before leaving the country. In 1622 Edward Vaux was licensed to raise a regiment of English Catholics for the Spanish service, but at the Siege of Bergen op Zoom, he was dismayed to find his regiment facing English Protestant troops despite Spanish promises to the contrary, and many of his men deserted rather than engage their fellow-countrymen.

Vaux paid £300 to purge his personal attendance on Charles I at York in March 1639 for the military expedition into Scotland known as the First Bishops' War.

== Marriage and estate ==
When Edward was seventeen, his mother sought to arrange his marriage to Elizabeth Howard, daughter of Thomas Howard, 1st Earl of Suffolk, but the marriage negotiations were abandoned as hopeless in the wake of the Gunpowder Plot, and Elizabeth was married to William Knollys, 1st Earl of Banbury who was some 40 years her senior on 23 December 1605. Nevertheless, Edward and Elizabeth Howard seem to have fallen in love, for they were married in June 1632 within five weeks of her first husband's death. The marriage produced no children, but Elizabeth's two sons, Edward (1627–1645) and Nicolas (1631–1674), born in the lifetime of her elderly first husband, were widely presumed to be the illegitimate sons of Edward Vaux. Neither son is mentioned in the earl's will, but in 1641 the law courts decided that Edward was Earl of Banbury, and when he was slain in an argument aged 18 (before June 1645), his brother Nicholas, who had used the surname "Vaux", took the title. On 19 October 1646, Edward Vaux settled the whole of his estates on Nicholas, speaking of him as "now Earl of Banbury, heretofore called Nicholas Vaux" to the total exclusion of his own lawful heirs. However, in the Convention Parliament of 1660 the House of Lords questioned Nicolas's right to the title and through Nicholas and his descendants arose a long contest for the Banbury peerage (see Knollys family).

Edward Vaux's wife Elizabeth died on 17 April 1658, aged 71. Vaux died on 8 September 1661, aged 74. Both were buried at Dorking, Surrey.

On Edward's death without legitimate issue, the Barony of Vaux of Harrowden was inherited by his brother Henry who died without issue in 1663.

In 1632, he added to his property in the area by purchasing the Manor of Little Harrowden from John Sanderson, his wife Cecily and John Sanderson junior.

== Notes ==
Peerage of England
Preceded by William Vaux	Baron Vaux of Harrowden; 1595–1661	Succeeded by Henry Vaux
