= John Bavant =

English Roman Catholic priest

John Bavant or Bavand alias Clarke (d. 1610/1613) was an English Roman Catholic priest. He was a well-respected teacher and scholar at Oxford, and served as the rector of Solihull during the 1560s, but eventually converted to Roman Catholicism and led the rest of his long life as an active missionary and ecclesiastical administrator.

== Oxford fellow ==
Nothing is known of John Bavant's origins, except that he came from Cheshire. He matriculated at Christ Church, Oxford, in 1547, where he took his MA on 17 February 1554, amongst a very distinguished cohort that included : Lawrence Humphrey, John ab Ulmis, and James Calfhill. Here he stayed until in 1558 he was appointed one of the three first graduate scholars at the newly established St John's College in the same university. Bavant was the first Greek reader at the college, from 1558 to c. 1564, and he counted amongst his pupils Edmund Campion and Gregory Martin. In 1560, Bavant was appointed rector of Solihull, in Warwickshire. He seems to have found his situation convenient, and his non-residence at St John's was resented. Finally, after declining to return to Oxford, Bavant was removed by the Founder, Sir Thomas White from his fellowship around 1566.

== Anglican clergyman ==
John Bavant was appointed to the rectory of Solihull on 12 September 1560, on the presentation of Sir Robert Throckmorton of Coughton Hall, who as lord of the manor of Solihull, owned the advowson, or right to present to a church living. Throckmorton was one of the central figures of the Roman Catholic community in the Midlands until his death in 1581; and a previous incumbent of Solihull (1544—1554) had been John Feckenham alias Howman, later abbot of Westminster Abbey under Queen Mary. Bavant remained at Solihull until he was deprived for non-residence in 1570, by which time he had presumably left for Rome. Bavant had other friends in the Roman Catholic community. Sir Edward Griffin of Dingley, in Northamptonshire, a friend of the Throckmortons, made Bavant a small bequest in his will, signed 11 August 1569. He also stipulated that Bavant should be first in line when one of the several livings in his presentation should become vacant. It was too late, however, for Bavant had set his sights on Rome. He was replaced at Solihull by Henry Smith, who was presented, with Throckmorton's permission, by the translator William Bavand. Bavand, who may have been a relative of John Bavant, lived at Stoke Albany in Northampton, a few miles from Dingley, and here Griffin was the lord of the manor, too.

== Roman Catholic missionary ==
By 1572, John Bavant was in Rome, when he resided at English Hospice (later the English College). He served as Warden in 1575, and Chamberlain in 1576; he also acted as Chaplain. After apparently receiving his doctorate of divinity in Rome, Bavant took himself to the English College in Rheims, where he worked with cardinal William Allen before returning to England as a missionary on 15 June 1581, with, amongst others, the scholar, poet and Jesuit, Jasper Heywood. After narrowly escaping arrest in Harrow, Middlesex, in November 1554, he was finally caught at Longford, Derbyshire, and by April 1585 he found himself locked up in the Wood Street Counter, in London. A petition was raised to have him released on the grounds of his age; and eventually he was set free. He continued his mission, and in the years that followed was reported to be active in Huntingdonshire and Berkshire. He was also protected by Sir Thomas Tresham, who as a child was a ward of Sir Robert Throckmorton, Bavant's patron at Solihull. Tresham also supported Bavant's old pupil Campion. In May 1595, he was called in to help settle the disputes amongst the Roman Catholic clergy imprisoned in Wisbech Castle, in Cambridgeshire. Bavant took an active and generally conciliatory role in the so-called ‘Wisbech Stirs’, that continued until 1598. In that year he was named as one of the six assistants to the Roman Catholic Archpriest in England, George Blackwell. John Bavant was still alive on 28 March 1610, when he wrote a letter from England to the Jesuit Robert Persons in Rome. His year of death is not known, but he had died before October 1613, when he was replaced by Richard Broughton as an assistant to the Archpriest, then George Birkhead.
