= Per saltum =

Latin phrase

Per saltum is a Latin phrase, meaning "hopping". It is used to mean that someone has reached an ecclesiastical position or degree without going through the posts or lower grades according to the established order. For example, as in some Protestant churches, being consecrated bishop without first being ordained priest.

Some universities award degrees per saltum where the student on examination shows they have completed necessary academic preparation but perhaps not been awarded the necessary lesser degrees for some good reason: this is different from an honorary degree. A notable example is Erasmus of Rotterdam's Doctor of Sacred Theology degree from the University of Turin in 1509, gained over fifteen days. Erasmus had previously studied or taught at the Universities of Paris, Cambridge, Oxford and Louvain; this per saltum degree is his only recorded qualification.

The phrase is also used in the legal term certiorari per saltum, meaning the possibility of seeking a resolution before a higher court, bypassing intermediate courts.

In Canada, parties to a case in a superior trial court can jointly seek leave to appeal per saltum from a decision of that court directly to the Supreme Court of Canada, bypassing the intermediate appellate court.
