= Wisbech Stirs =

English Roman Catholic clergy quarrel

The Wisbech Stirs was a divisive quarrel between English Roman Catholic clergy held prisoner in Wisbech Castle in the Isle of Ely, Cambridgeshire, towards the end of the reign of Elizabeth I of England. It set some of the secular clergy (not members of a religious institute) against the regular clergy represented by the Society of Jesus (the Jesuits), the religious institute that was emerging as clerical leaders, and who wished for a more ordered communal life in the prison.

The arguments came to a head during 1594–5, and were then patched up, but distrust continued; the Stirs foreshadowed two generations of conflict, including the Archpriest Controversy, and the troubles over the Old Chapter, which likewise set part of the Catholic secular clergy against some of the Jesuit missioners concerned with England. In fact there was a long period, from 1587 well into the 17th century, when this division among Catholic priests in England was prominent. The idea that there was a continuous strand of anti-Jesuit agitation in these troubles was launched early by Jesuit Robert Persons, but is not now accepted in unqualified form.

== Background ==
Wisbech Castle at this time was an episcopal palace of the Bishop of Ely. From 1580 it was used to detain Catholic clergy who had been arrested under penal laws, in a policy of internment.

The problems that surfaced at Wisbech went back at least 15 years. Thomas Watson died in 1584, the last bishop of the Catholic hierarchy in England who commanded general allegiance. Thomas Metham had informally acted as Watson's successor at Wisbech; he died in 1592. Cardinal William Allen died in 1594. A group around Charles Paget opposed the appointment of the Jesuit Robert Parsons as his replacement, supporting instead Owen Lewis. Lewis died also in 1594, but Parsons was not made Cardinal, and campaigning involving the English College, Rome, included also efforts to lobby the secular priests at Wisbech. Contemporary with the later years of the Stirs were disputes in Flanders that Ludwig Pastor regarded as similar.

== The Wisbech factions ==
The opposing groups were led by Christopher Bagshaw with Thomas Bluet, and the Jesuit William Weston. The immediate cause of the friction was the keeping of fast days. Peter Burke sees the faultline, traditionally described as "Jesuits and seculars" (for example in Thomas Graves Law, The Conflicts between Jesuits and Seculars in the reign of Queen Elizabeth, 1889) as between Counter-Reformation Catholics and Catholics of a more traditional mould; he takes as example the strife over a hobby horse brought out for Christmas celebrations.

There were perhaps 33 Catholics then kept in the castle, who were almost all priests. A list given by Law (Appendix A) applies to 1595/6, and shows 32. A group of 18 were with the Jesuits Weston and Thomas Pounde (a lay brother) in wishing a separate regular life (on some accounts Pounde was not at Wisbech for the main episodes of the Stirs, however). Henry Garnet, who was Jesuit provincial in the country, consented to this in February 1595. But in practical terms there was hardly room for two groups living separately. In 1584 a maximum of 20 had been set. Garnet's handling of the issue set off vehement protest from Bagshaw and his supporters.

In his later book on the affair, Bagshaw blamed the Stirs on Weston, as emissary of Parsons. The underlying tension over Parsons and the vacuum caused for the English mission by the death of Cardinal Allen played a part, and were the reason for intrigue; but so did local factors, including Bagshaw's abuse of those wishing to have a more regulated communal life, with comparisons to Puritans and Calvinists. The conflict had wide ramifications: Bagshaw was in touch not only with Paget, who had backing from William Gifford in France, but with another group with connections in Rome (Hugh Griffin and Nicholas Fitzherbert).

John Bavant and Alban Dolman were called in first, but they were split as to what to do. Bavant was not a Jesuit, but participated in an administrative network set up by the Jesuits, for which he took responsibility in East Anglia. Dolman was in the Servants of Mary. In October 1595 two more arbitrators, John Mush and Richard Dudley, intervened to mediate, with greater success; Mush was more sympathetic to the anti-Jesuit group led by Bagshaw. But the problem returned in 1596.

In late 1600 or early 1601 there was a transfer of 36 priest prisoners at Wisbech Castle to Framlingham Castle in Suffolk.
