= Anne Vaux =

Recusant

- Born: c. 1562
- Died: In or after 1637 (aged about 75)
- Noble family: Vaux (by birth)
- Father: William Vaux, 3rd Baron Vaux of Harrowden
- Mother: Elizabeth Beaumont

Anne Vaux (c. 1562 – in or after 1637) was a wealthy Catholic recusant. She was suspected of being the author of a letter warning about the Gunpowder plot.

== Background ==
Vaux was the third daughter of William Vaux, 3rd Baron Vaux of Harrowden (1535–1595) and his first wife, Elizabeth, daughter of John Beaumont of Grace Dieu, Leicester. She and her sister Eleanor Brooksby supported Catholic priests by renting houses where priests could convene safely. Among these houses was Whitewebbs in Enfield Chase, which was visited by several of the Gunpowder Plotters.

Vaux was particularly devoted to Father Henry Garnet, a Jesuit priest who was later executed for his foreknowledge of the Gunpowder Plot. She was related to Francis Tresham, one of the plotters. Both Vaux and Tresham have been suspected of being the author of an anonymous letter to William Parker, 4th Baron Monteagle, warning him to avoid Parliament on 5 November 1605, the day that the Gunpowder Plotters intended to blow it up. This letter, which Monteagle gave to Robert Cecil, 1st Earl of Salisbury, was instrumental in foiling the plot. The identity of the letter's author has never been conclusively determined. The theory that it was written by Vaux is based largely on "perceived similarities" between her handwriting and that used in the letter.

Vaux suspected the existence of the Gunpowder Plot, but she played no direct role in it. She was arrested shortly after the plot was discovered but was released on a bond put up by Lewis Pickering. After her release, she tried unsuccessfully to hide Garnet at the home of Thomas Abington at Hindlip, Worcestershire. He was discovered and arrested by Thomas Bromley on 25 January and incarcerated in the Tower of London. Vaux travelled to London by 11 March.

She attempted to communicate with Garnet through concealed messages on letters given to his gaoler. The messages were written in orange juice; historian Anstruther argues that their illegibility, noted by Garnet, indicates that Vaux was near-sighted and unaccustomed to writing. Recent researchers conclude that her use of punctuation is not unusual and the writing is difficult to read only because invisible ink is difficult to use. The messages were forwarded to Salisbury, and Vaux was arrested in March 1606. Under interrogation, she proclaimed herself innocent of treason but admitted to receiving conspirators at her houses; she was released in August.

Vaux moved to her sister Eleanor's family estate in Leicestershire, where she was convicted of recusancy in 1625, and after her sister's death moved to Stanley Grange, Derbyshire. She founded a school for boys from Catholic noble families, which the Protestant authorities tried to shut down in 1635. She died in 1637 or later.

== In popular culture ==
Anne Vaux was played by Helen Longworth in The Gunpowder Plot on BBC Radio 3, Carolyn Pickles in the BBC Radio 4 miniseries Gunpowder Women and by Liv Tyler in the BBC One series Gunpowder.
