= William Vaux, 3rd Baron Vaux of Harrowden =

English peer

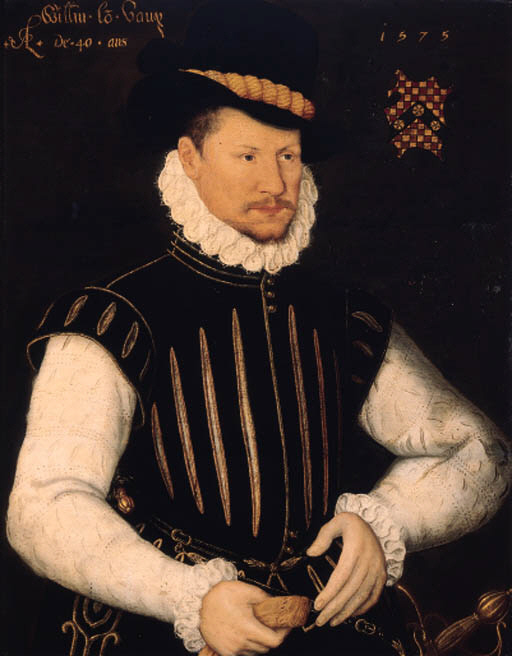
William, Lord Vaux of Harrowden, 1575

William Vaux, 3rd Baron Vaux of Harrowden (before 14 August 1535 – 20 August 1595) was an English peer. He was noted for his Roman Catholic faith and support of Catholic missionary activity.

== Life ==
The son of Thomas Vaux, 2nd Baron Vaux of Harrowden, he succeeded his father as Baron Vaux of Harrowden in October 1556.

As a Catholic, Vaux was several times convicted of recusancy during the reign of Elizabeth I. He was committed to the Fleet Prison by the Privy Council, and afterwards was tried in the Star Chamber on 15 February 1581 along with his brother-in-law Sir Thomas Tresham for harbouring the Jesuit Edmund Campion and contempt of court. He was sentenced to imprisonment in the Fleet and a fine of £1,000 (about £343,000 as of 2025).

== Marriages and children ==
William Vaux married firstly Elizabeth, daughter of John Beaumont of Grace Dieu, Leicester. Their children were:

- Henry
- Eleanor; married Edward Brokesby, Esq., of Sholdby, Leicester
- Elizabeth; a nun, at Caen, in Normandy
- Anne

His second wife was Mary, daughter of John Tresham of Rushton, son of Sir Thomas Tresham I. Their children were:

- George (died 13 July 1594); married Elizabeth, daughter of Sir John Roper of Welle Place, Kent. They were parents to Edward Vaux, 4th Baron Vaux of Harrowden.
- William
- Henry
- Katherine
- Edward
- Ambrose
- Muriel; married George Foulshurst

== Properties and heirs ==
In 1557 Vaux conveyed the manors and advowsons of the family estates at Great and Little Harrowden to his second wife's grandfather, Sir Thomas Tresham I, who died in 1559 and was succeeded by his grandson, another Sir Thomas. The Tresham Papers contain an account of the family disputes which resulted from a 1571 settlement of the properties, under which the younger Sir Thomas stood security for the payment of £500 (£223,000 as of 2025) to each of Vaux's daughters by his first wife.

William Vaux's eldest son Henry renounced his rights to the family titles to his half-brother George with the intention of entering the priesthood, but both Henry and George predeceased their father. On Vaux's death in 1595, he was succeeded by his grandson, George's son Edward, who inherited the titles shortly before his seventh birthday.

== Notes ==
Peerage of England
Preceded by Thomas Vaux	Baron Vaux of Harrowden; 1556–1595	Succeeded by Edward Vaux
