= Diego de Estella =

Spanish theologian (1524–1578)

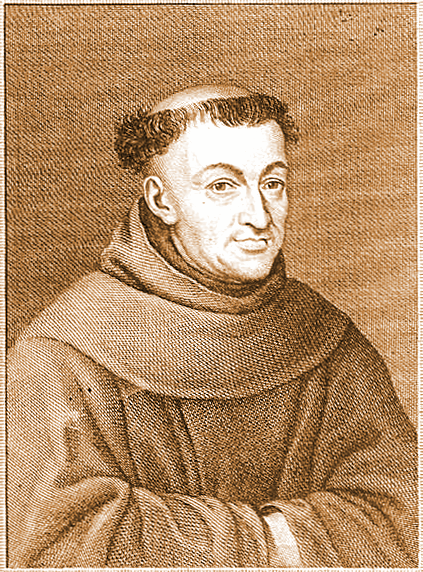

Diego de Estella (Latin: Didacus Stella) was a 16th-century Spanish Franciscan mystic and theologian, born 1524 in Estella, Navarra, died 1578 in Salamanca. His secular name was Diego Ballesteros y Cruzas.

With connections in the Spanish court, he was appointed preacher of Philip the Second, and enjoyed worldwide recognition for his theological works displayed in an outstanding classical rhetoric, notably his "The contempt of the world and the vanitie thereof" translated to a vast number of languages both by Catholics and Protestants-Ánglicans from the ending of the 16th to the 20th century. In Elizabethan England his main title, often smuggled, was used as a tool by both, English recusants wishing to keep their catholic faith alive and Anglicans, who enjoyed the high rhetorics of Fray Diego while they adapted the Catholic dogmas to Anglicanism.

After some criticism to the king because of the erection of the royal palace "El Escorial" Fray Diego was exiled to a Franciscan monastery, where, also in conflict with Franciscan authorities, he spent the rest of his days battling the inquisition for his book "Enarrationes in Evangelium secundum Lucam".

== Works ==
- Libro de la vanidad del mundo (1562)
- Tratado de la vida de San Juan (1554)
- Tratado de la vanidad del mundo (second edition) (1574)
- Enarrationes in Evangelium secundum Lucam (1577)
- Meditaciones dévotisimas del amor de Dios (1578).

He was the author of a book on Saint Luke that was outlawed by the Spanish Inquisition.
