= Wisbech Castle =

Former castle site in Wisbech, Cambridgeshire, England

Coordinates: 52.66423°N 0.16011°E

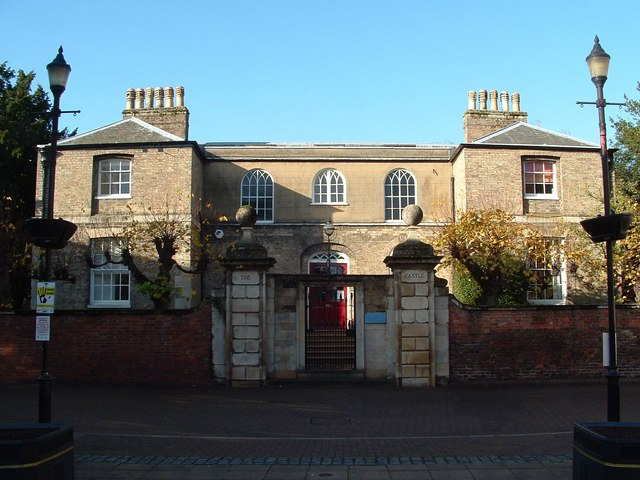
Building on the site of the castle at Wisbech

The Castle at Wisbech was a stone motte-and-bailey castle built to fortify Wisbech (historically in the Isle of Ely and now also in the Fenland District of Cambridgeshire, England) on the orders of William I in 1072, it probably replaced an earlier timber and turf complex. The layout was probably oval in shape and size, on the line still marked by the Circus. The original design and layout is unknown. It was rebuilt in stone in 1087. The castle was reputedly destroyed in a flood in 1236. In the 15th century, repairs were becoming too much for the ageing structure, and a new building was started in 1478 under John Morton, Bishop of Ely (later Archbishop of Canterbury and Chancellor of England). His successor, John Alcock, extended and completed the re-building and died in the Castle in 1500. Subsequent bishops also spent considerable sums on this new palace. The Bishop's Palace was built of brick with dressings of Ketton Stone, but its exact location is unknown.

In later Tudor times, the rebuilt castle became a notorious prison. The site was again redeveloped in the mid-17th century and yet again in 1816 by Joseph Medworth. A 1794 plan of the 'castle' exists; this only shows the 'castle' as it existed at the end of the 18th century, prior to the development of the site to its current form.

The Regency building known as The Castle, Museum Square, Wisbech PE13 3ES was given Grade II* listed status on 31 October 1983 following the vaults Grade II listed in 1969. It now stands in the middle of a circus.

== History ==
=== Middle Ages ===
The Domesday Book of 1086 makes no mention of a castle at Wisbech.

King John travelled from Lynn to Lincolnshire via Wisbech, and stayed at the castle on 12 October 1216. His baggage train is reported to have got into difficulties crossing a river or estuary and the wagons and contents, including the regalia and other treasures, were lost. In recent years, treasure seekers have tried to find the location of this incident and the lost treasures.

The castle and town of Wisbech were swept away in a storm in 1236, although the castle appears to have soon been rebuilt as a keeper or Constable is named in 1246.

King Edward II of England visited the castle in 1292, 1298, 1300 and 1305.

In 1315, Richard Lambert of King's Lynn, a merchant, brought an action against William le Blowere and others for a conspiracy to imprison him. He had been "thrown in the depth of the gaol of Wysebech among thieves, where by toads and other venomous vermin he was so inhumanely gnawed that his life was despaired of".

The castle tower was repaired during 1332–1333 using six fotmel (approximately 420 lb) of lead, and a year later the bakehouse wall was buttressed using 6,000 bricks.

In 1350, John de Walton was lodged in the castle accused of trespass and rebellion. In the same year the Bishop's Constable and his men were "besieged" by John de Stonore, Lord Chief Justice of the King's Bench.

There were several fisheries belonging to the manor of Wisbech alone. In the 1350s the reeves of Walton and Leverington each sent a porpoise to Wisbech Castle, and the reeve of Terrington a swordfish.

In 1355, a licence was issued to John Boton, vicar of Wysebeche, to marry Hugh Lovet of Lincoln, the bishop's domicellus, and Jane de Pateshalle in the chapel of the Castle of Wysebech.

"On 23 July 1381 Thomas Arundel, Bishop of Ely, by his letters dated from Wisbech Castle gave directions for the excommunication of those involved in insurrection in Cambridge."

In 1409, a new Floud Gate and a new water gate were erected and a new pons tractabilis (bridge) built towards the church. Constructions in 1410 included a new pons tractabilis towards the church, a chapel within and a bridge without the castle, and a garden and dove house (destroyed in 1531), all walled around and moated.

In 1410, John Colvile was the governor or constable. (Note: probably son of John Colville (died 1394)) A steel seal used by him has a representation of a castle in the form of a fortress, with circular keep. A wax copy may be seen in Wisbech & Fenland Museum.

In 1414, Dominus Heyle and several prisoners taken by the Earl of Dorchester were kept here by permission of bishop John Fordham.

In 1443, the houses and chambers called Le Dungeon are allotted to the Constable.

During 1478–83, the Bishop's Palace in Wisbech was constructed of bricks measuring 11 inches in length and 2.5 inches thick with a dressing of Ketton stone. The property's cellars and foundations can still be seen. The palace was extended by Bishop Alcock.

=== 16th century ===
Wisbech was used as a prison in part due to its remote location. It took prisoners under escort three days to walk between Wisbech and London. During Queen Mary's restoration of Roman Catholicism, Protestants were imprisoned at Wisbech. William Wolsey and Robert Piggott were imprisoned but then removed and later burnt at the stake.

In 1577 Cecilia Samuel was tried, convicted and hanged at Ely for drowning her newborn son in the ditch called the Castell dike in Wisbech.

In 1580 the bishop was enjoined to put the castle "in order and strength" to receive prisoners, and the first were received in October. In October 1580 Roger Goad, Bridgewater and William Fulke engaged in the examination of John Bourne, a glover and some others of the Family of Love who were confined in the castle.

In 1583 a prisoner, Andrew Oxenbridge, is recorded as taking the oath of supremacy.

In 1584 John Feckenham (aka John Howman) died in the castle. Imprisoned in the Tower of London during the reign of Edward VI, he was made Abbot of Westminster by Mary Tudor but sent back to the Tower by Elizabeth I. While a prisoner in Wisbech he is said to have paid for a market cross to be erected. Later it was changed to an obelisk, but it was removed in April 1811.

During the reign of Elizabeth I while the seat of the bishopric was left vacant, the Queen's halmote court to dealt with cases such as the surrender (transfer) of land at "Stowecroft", "Sybbilsholme", "Harecrofte" by Jacomina Robinson to her son John Crosse in July 1586.

Other leading Roman Catholics were imprisoned for political reasons at the time of the Spanish Armada: Robert Catesby and Francis Tresham are reported to have been held at Wisbeach Castle in 1588. Later they were principal conspirators in the Gunpowder Plot.

In the last years of the 16th century there were 33 Catholics held prisoner in Wisbech Castle, almost all of them priests, including the Jesuit priests Christopher Holywood and William Weston, and lay brother Thomas Pounde. A quarrel arose among them that came to be known as the "Wisbech Stirs". In the winter of 1594-95 a substantial group (18 of the 33) wished to separate themselves from the rest and adopt a regular communal life. This was largely impossible without appearing to castigate those who did not want to make this change and on account of the limited space. The unwilling minority argued, which only confirmed the others in their resolve, and the separation was carried out in February 1595, but came to an end with a general reconciliation in November of that same year. Philip Strangeways was one of the missionary priests imprisoned at Wisbech at the end of Elizabeth's reign.

Francis Young's research indicates that there were at least 111 prisoners.

=== 17th century ===
John and Robert Nutter were brothers, born in Burnley. After university, both studied at the English College in Rheims before being ordained. Soon after returning to England to minister to recusant communities, they were captured and sent to the Tower of London. Robert was tortured before being forced to see his brother being hanged, drawn and quartered. Robert was eventually released and transported to France, but recaptured on his return to England and sent to Newgate, the Marshalsea and thence to Wisbech Castle. After escaping from the castle and recapture, he was martyred at Lancaster in July 1600. A fellow prisoner in Wisbech Castle was Antony Champney.

William Chester was Constable from 1605 until his death in the castle in 1608; he was buried in St Peter's churchyard.

There is a memorial to Matthias Taylor, Constable of the Castle in the Parish Church of St Peter and St Paul, Wisbech. Eight Jesuits escaped custody during his tenure: three in 1614 and five in 1615. His monument states that three sons, five daughters and 22 grandchildren survived him.

In 1616, a priest, Thomas Tunstal, escaped from the castle to Norfolk. Hamon L'Estrange had him pursued and apprehended. He was tried at Norwich and condemned and executed. The use of the castle for recusant prisoners ceased in 1627.

During the English Civil War, after Oliver Cromwell had been appointed governor of the Isle of Ely for his activity in swaying it to the interest of Parliament, he refortified the castle and town with outposts at the Horseshoe Sluice and Leverington. The soldiers stationed to defend the town were commanded by Colonel John Palgrave and Captain William Dodson; and the ammunition, and other warlike stores, were supplied from a Dutch ship, which the Queen had dispatched from Holland for the use of the Royalists, but which had been captured. In 1643 the castle was used to secure the river Nene frontier and to block any attempt by the Newark garrison to relieve the besieged King's Lynn Royalists. The castle was armed with cannon "Great Guns" from Ely and money from the town paid for ironwork to repair the drawbridge. The garrison at Wisbech was commanded by Col Dodson and carried out skirmishing in the surrounding Fenland. The naval blockade, siege and bombardment brought capitulation from King's Lynn after three weeks. Peterborough was occupied by the Parliamentarians before the capture of Crowland.

Captain Thomas Pigge of Walsoken was taken prisoner by the Earl of Essex in October 1634 and exchanged at Burghley House "on a bond of £2,000 never to bear arms again".

Secretary of State John Thurloe, of Lincoln's Inn, Middlesex, purchased the manors of Wisbech Barton, Elm and Todd St. Giles and the "castle estate". He sold off some property, demolished the bishop's palace, and then built and furnished a mansion, aka Thurloe's mansion (demolished by Joseph Medworth c. 1816). Shortly afterwards, during the Restoration of the Monarchy, his house and estates in Wisbech were repossessed by the Bishop of Ely. Jonas Moore's "Mapp of the Great Levell of the Fens" (1658) shows the town with a church and a large building surrounded by a moat, Thurloe's coat of arms is one of those nearby. William Dugdale noted that a lock at the Horseshoe (on the River Nene) erected in an earlier phase of the drainage work, which "cost £7000 at least" had since been "pulled down, as useless, and is disposed of to Mr. Secretary Thurloe, towards his building of that fair new house in Wisbech, which stands where the old Castle was". Thurloe also built a property (or properties) nearby for his sons.

The demolition of the bishop's palace and construction of Thurloe's mansion did not end the imprisonment for religious beliefs in Wisbech. In 1663 John Inds late of Ely, was taken with several other Friends from a peaceable meeting on 16 February, and sent to Wisbech Gaol, where he was kept prisoner for three years.

In 1664 Matthew Wren, Lord Bishop of Ely, was liable for 24 hearths. In 1662 it had been 25, one later being pulled down.

Henry Pierson (died 1664), born in Wisbech, was the first post-Restoration tenant to lease the castle from the Bishop of Ely.

The Southwell family were tenants for over 100 years.

=== 18th century ===
The household goods of Mrs Edwards (deceased) were auctioned at the castle on 8 July 1724.

'Notice To be SOLD, A Very good Milch Ass, with a She-foal a Fortnight old. Enquire at the Castle in Wisbeach', was advertised in the Stamford Mercury on 7 July 1737. In 1762 it was reported that Henry Southwell, Esq., an eminent Merchant at Wisbech, Receiver-General of this County, and many years in the Commission of the Peace, had died. In 1778/1779, the Italian author and poet Giuseppe Marc'Antonio Baretti (1718–1789) resided with Edward Southwell and his family living at the Castle for about a fortnight. Afterwards, he published a series of letters, Lettere Familiari de Giuseppe Baretti, including a description of his Wisbech visit, including attending the race meet and a theatre performance.

The death of Edward Southwell, age 60, of The Castle, Wisbech was reported in the January 1788 press.

To be sold by auction At the New Theatre (now the Angles Theatre) in Deadman's Lane, in Wisbech on Tuesday the eighth of November, 1791, and the following days. On the death of Edward Southwell, All the elegant and genuine HOUSEHOLD FURNITURE, LINEN, and CHINA, brought from the Castle (his late Dwelling-House) in Wisbech, a sale not being permitted on the Premises.

Jane Southwell, (aka Lady Jane Trafford) (1732–1809), heiress of Wisbech Castle, married Sir Clement Trafford (aka Clement Boehm); they had three children, Clement (1761–1768), Sigismund & Jane. Separated by 1764. She changed her name back to Southwell by an act of Parliament in 1791 in order to inherit from her brother Edward. Buried at Orsett, Essex, the home of her daughter Jane who married Richard Baker. In her will she expressed a wish to be buried in Wisbech.

The Wisbech Saint Peter's Castle Act 1793 (33 Geo. 3. c. 53 Pr.), empowered the Bishop of Ely to sell the castle. James Yorke, the Bishop of Ely put up the castle for auction in six lots at the Rainbow coffee house, Cornhill, London on 13 November 1793. Joseph Medworth was the highest bidder for all six lots, totalling £2,305.

In 1796 John Thelwall attempted to give his lecture in a room in the castle; the lecture was not completed due to disturbances outside the castle.

=== 19th century ===
Joseph Medworth was elected town bailiff in 1809. In 1811 he offered Thurloe's mansion and the enclosed garden to the corporation for £2,000 for the use of Wisbech Grammar School, but they did not take up the offer. Subsequently, Medworth demolished the mansion and used the material to build his villa, now known as the castle. It was reported "The removal of the ancient building left unseemly hollows, and as the best mode of dealing with them Mr Medworth built arches upon which is laid a terraced garden walk. In one portion of the vaults the end of the basement wall of the garden front of Thurlow's house may be seen cut through, and a well is preserved, the lower part of which is very possibly of some antiquity.

William Richards, in his History of Lynn Vol I published in 1812, describes the castle site.

"The detached (castle) buildings have been removed and some elegant rows of houses have been erected. The plan of a large Circus has already also been laid out, about one half which has already been built: when the plan is completed it will add greatly to the pleasantness and beauty of the town. The Castle is still standing, and likely to stand, with what may be called fair play, as long as any of the new buildings, although it has been built now over 150 years, and was, at the time of the sale, stated (even by his lordship, it seems) to be in a decayed and ruinous condition".

In January 1814, the castle was temporarily used by the seminary for young ladies run by Miss Diggle and Miss Oldham, whilst their property in The Crescent was completed.

W. Holmes ran a boarding school at the castle for young gentlemen from about 1830 until the 1840s. In 1842, F. Ewen's name also featured in the adverts. By January 1844, the school was advertised as a boarding and day school of W. Holmes & son.

Charles Boucher (1817-1853) of the castle is reported to have broken his arm. Boucher married Elizabeth Russell on 4 July 1844. A son was born to the Bouchers in 1845. On Friday, 30 October 1846 the Lincolnshire Chronicle paper reports a birth: "At The Castle, Wisbech on the 15th inst., the lady of Charles Boucher. jun., Esq., of a son". Later, it reports a death: "Died at Wisbech, on the 30th April, 1849 in her 26th year, Elizabeth Russell wife Chas. Boucher, jun. Esq, and only child of Thos. Stear, Esq"

The next tenant appears to have been a school advertising in the press.

The Castle, Wisbech. MISS HARMAN ANNOUNCES to her Friends, that her Establishment will Re-open on Saturday, the 20th inst and the Duties Resumed Monday, the 22nd. Prospectuses forwarded on application.

In March 1864, the castle was sold at a public auction for £1,300 to William Peckover FSA and later passed down the family. The occupant of the Castle at this time was reported to be a Miss Hannan and the building in use as a boarding school. Sarah Hardman, aged 74, died at the castle in 1868.

The will of Chas. Boucher, Esq., (died December 1865 aged 82) of Wisbech, father of Charles Boucher, was reported in the press on 10 August 1866. Harman was still running the school on the site in 1886. By 1888, F. W. Bradley was in residence, as the press reports "an interesting gathering of archaeologists and others, including many members of Wisbech Natural History Society, to view The Castle grounds and vaults, by invitation of Mr. F. W. Bradley, who conducted the party over the premises." Bradley married May Langley, youngest daughter of J Langley, of Primrose Farm Tilney, at Tilney All Saints on Wednesday, 11 September 1889. One of the pupils of the private school at the castle run by May Bradley was farmer's daughter Lilian Pratt.

=== 20th century ===
At the turn of the century The Castle tenant was still the dentist F W Bradley. The Northern Whig No 28,517 reported on Tuesday 2 January 1900 "Births" - "Bradley December 31, at Wisbech Castle, Cambs, the wife of F.W.Bradley, of a daughter."

On 16 May 1903 a chimney fire set the roof on fire at the castle. It took 12 hours to extinguish. In the 1920s the lawn was laid out as a lawn tennis court. He remained in occupation as a tenant of Lord Peckover for 48 years until 1935. At this time there was still a statue of Mercury (from the garden of Thurloe’s Mansion) above the vaults in the garden.

In 1955 excavations on the site of Messrs. Keightley's new building in the Market Place revealed evidence of a wall and extensive moat, in which were found pottery, leather sole shoes, slim fitting with long pointed toes and an early 15th century gilt spur.

Following the death of A.P.D. Penrose, son of J. Doyle Penrose and grandson of Baron Peckover, the castle was put up for auction in October 1957, the property was withdrawn at £4,450 but bought a few weeks later by Mrs F C D Fendick, wife of the Isle of Ely Chief Education officer. Her husband Tee Gordon Fendick, M.A. LL.B. wrote an article 'Wisbech castle: Past and Present' published in 1960 in it, he refers to the building's secrets, including a bricked up space between two rooms. An Anglia Television report on the history of Wisbech Castle shown in 1963 is available on the East Anglian Film Archive. After his death in the 1960s, Florence transferred ownership to Isle of Ely County Council in March 1969. Fendick, aged 94, died in 1984. After a merger this became the Cambridgeshire and Isle of Ely County Council, then later Cambridgeshire County Council. In 1988 Princess Alice, Duchess of Gloucester made a tour of The Castle.

The Castle was to be used as an educational museum for schools. A concealed fire escape was installed. The Fendick Room, previously the drawing room was to be used for meetings of a cultural and educational nature (maximum capacity - 30 persons). Leslie 'George' Anniss MBE FGS was castle custodian from 1971-1977 and carried out research leading to the publication of A History of Wisbech Castle. One of his paintings, a copy of an earlier painting of Thurloe's mansion, is available from an online collection.

The custodian in 1979 was Mr F Sumner when it was used for a Save the Children Fund coffee Morning.

The Castle was used as a Teacher's Professional Development Centre, providing a venue for meetings and training. In 1987 it also staged an outdoor performance of Romeo and Juliet by the theatre company of the Angles Theatre; the balcony scene utilised the balcony of The Castle itself.

=== 21st century ===
In September 2009, excavations were carried out on the site by Oxford Archaeology East and local volunteers. The report was published in July 2010. The Wisbech Castle Community Archaeology Project was 'Highly Commended' in the Best Community Archaeology Project category at the 2010 British Archaeological Awards. As a result of the dig, local volunteers formed a local archaeology group – the Wisbech and District Archaeology Society (WADAS) - now FenArch (Fenland Archaeological Society).

Cambridgeshire County Council intended to sell the property. It was registered as an asset of community value to enable a community group to take it on. However, Wisbech Town Council stepped in and a business plan was drawn up and presented by Cllr Hoy.

In February 2018, Wisbech Town Council acquired a 30 year lease from Cambridgeshire County Council and a loan of £150,000 to carry out repairs and took over the running of the site. The Castle project was to be run by a Castle Management committee of Wisbech Town council and a Castle Working Party of councillors and volunteers. In November 2019 an open day was held at The Castle to mark the 10th anniversaries of the 2009 dig and the formation of Fenland Archaeological Society (FenArch). The finds from the 2009 dig, now held by Wisbech & Fenland Museum, were loaned for the exhibition.

There have been school visits, and the property is licensed for civil weddings.

The museum's collection of artworks is now online and includes painting of the castle, former occupants and others associated with the castle in its various forms.

In May 2021 the castle hosted the Mayor-making for the first time. In July 2021 following the relaxation of COVID-19 lockdown restrictions the gardens were a venue for a concert by the Hexachordia trio performing All in a Garden Green a celebration of the English garden in music, song and verse, tracing its history from monastic herb gardens to more formal grounds. The event raised funds for the Wisbech & Fenland Museum. By 2023 the operation of running the castle was still making a loss.

== The Vaults ==
The Castle vaults lie where Thurloe's mansion was built. In 1878 when the 35th Congress of the British Archaeological Association took place in Wisbech, it was reported that "the removal of the ancient building left unseemly hollows and as the best method of dealing with them Mr Medworth built arches upon which is laid a terraced garden walk". The vaults are opened to the public on occasion. They are now accessed by a door facing the front of Medworth's Regency villa. William Weston in his diaries states that all the Catholic prisoners could observe through the windows of their cells the assemblies of over a thousand people taking part in religious events inside the castle site. The ceiling of Thomas Pounds's cell (beams, plaster, mortar and all) fell in. This could not have been the case if the prisoners were kept in the vaults that are present on the site today. They are still sometimes erroneously described by volunteer guides and ghost-hunters as being where the religious prisoners were kept or as being the Norman dungeons. Archaeological investigations do not ascribe these remains, with the possible exception of a well, to periods that early.

== Constables of the Castle ==
- 1246 William Justice
- 1262 Simon de Dullingham
- 1308 Richard de Halstead (or Halsted)
- 1401 Thomas De Bramstone (Braunstone?)
- 1408 Sir John de Rochford
- 1410 Sir John de Colvile aka Sir John Colville (c.1365-1446), who founded the college of St. Mary-on-the-Sea at the nearby village of Newton-in-the-Isle.
- 1446 Sir Andrew Hoggard or Ogard
- 1476 Sir Thomas Grey
- 1489 Sir James Hobart or Sir Thomas Hobart
- 1525 Walter And Miles Hubbard
- 1531 Thomas Megges,
- Sir Richard Cromwell
- 1605 William Chester, Sen, Esq
- c.1609–1619 Rowland Bradford
- 1633 Matthias Taylor, Esq

== Keepers of the Castle ==
- c1584-c 1588 Thomas Grey

== Popular culture ==
The Castle, under the name Barbican House, in The Crescent, is one of several local sites that features in local journalist John Gordon's novel The Flesh Eater. Gordon frequently used Wisbech locations in his novels.
