= Apostolic Vicariate of England =

17th-century Catholic jurisdiction

The Apostolic Vicariate of England (and Wales)

Location
- Country: England and Wales

Information
- Denomination: Catholic Church
- Sui iuris church: Latin Church
- Established: 1623
- Dissolved: 30 January 1688

Map

The Apostolic Vicariate of England (and Wales) was an ecclesiastical jurisdiction of the Roman Catholic Church in England and Wales. It was led by a vicar apostolic (or apostolic vicar) who was a titular bishop. The apostolic vicariate was created in 1623 and was divided into four districts in 1688.

== Background ==
Soon after the accession of Queen Elizabeth I, in 1559, the bishops of England and Wales were forced to choose between taking the Oath of Supremacy, thus denying the authority of the Pope, and losing their episcopal sees. Those who chose to continue their allegiance to Rome were subsequently deposed and replaced in their sees by priests of the Church of England. Most of the deposed Bishops were imprisoned in various locations and died in captivity over a period of years, though some left the country and continued their work overseas. The last of the deposed bishops was Thomas Goldwell, Bishop of St Asaph, who died in Rome on 3 April 1585.

== Apostolic Vicariate of England (and Wales) ==
In 1623, after 65 years of formal absence from England, Pope Urban VIII decided once again to appoint a bishop with actual jurisdiction in England. His choice fell upon William Bishop, who was given the title of Apostolic Vicar of England. Bishop landed secretly in England at midnight on 31 July 1623, but was to die only nine months later.

Bishop was succeeded in office by Richard Smith, also ordained a bishop, who arrived in England in April 1625. However, two warrants were issued for Smith's arrest in August 1631, and he was forced to resign and flee to France, where he eventually died in Paris in 1655. After 1631, there was no Roman Catholic bishop in England for another 54 years, and the void was to some extent filled by a dean and chapter of rather unsure legal status, first established by Bishop and confirmed by Smith.

It was only in 1685 that a successor was appointed by Rome, in the person of John Leyburn, a Doctor of Divinity of the Sorbonne and a former President of the English College at Douai, who was consecrated bishop in Rome on 9 September 1685. In 1623, Bishop had divided England into six areas, at the head of each of which he placed a superior with the title of vicar general, and this had remained the system thereafter. Leyburn reduced these six areas to four. In the summer of 1687 he toured the North of England and confirmed over 20,000 Catholics there.

On 30 January 1688, the number of bishops in England and Wales was increased by the Pope to four vicars apostolic, as a result of which the single apostolic vicariate was divided into the London, Midland, Northern and Western districts.

== Office holders ==
=== List of Archpriests ===
Archpriests of England (and Wales)
From	Until	Incumbent	Notes
1598	1608	George Blackwell	Appointed in March 1598, became involved in the Archpriest Controversy and removed from his position on 1 February 1608, died in The Clink on 12 January 1613
1608	1614	George Birkhead	Appointed on 1 February 1608 and died in office on 6 April 1614
1615	1621	William Harrison	Appointed on 23 February 1615 and died in office on 11 May 1621
In 1623, the Vicariate Apostolic of England (and Wales) was established

=== List of Vicars Apostolic ===
Vicars Apostolic of England (and Wales)
From	Until	Incumbent	Notes
1623	1624	William Bishop, Titular Bishop of Chalcedon	Appointed vicar apostolic on 15 March 1623 and consecrated titular bishop on 4 June 1623. Died in office on 13 April 1624.
1624	1632	Richard Smith, Titular Bishop of Chalcedon	Appointed vicar apostolic on 29 November 1624 and consecrated titular bishop on 12 June 1625. Resigned in 1632 and died on 18 March 1655.
1632	1685	Vacant	
1685	1688	John Leyburn, Titular Bishop of Adramyttium	Appointed vicar apostolic on 24 August 1685 and consecrated titular bishop on 9 September 1685. Became Vicar Apostolic of the London District on 30 January 1688.
In 1688, England and Wales was divided into four apostolic vicariates – the London, Midland, Northern and Western districts.

== See also ==
- Religion in the United Kingdom
- Roman Catholicism in England and Wales
- Roman Catholicism in the United Kingdom

== Bibliography ==
- Brady, W. Maziere (1876c). The Episcopal Succession in England, Scotland and Ireland, A.D. 1400 to 1875. Vol. 3. Rome: Tipografia Della Pace.
- Hemphill, Basil (1953). The Early Vicars Apostolic of England 1685-1750. London: Burns & Oates.
- Schofield, Nicholas; Skinner, Gerard (2009). The English Vicars Apostolic. Oxford: Family Publications. ISBN 978-1-907380-01-3.
