= John Colleton (priest) =

English priest

John Colleton (1548–1635) was an English Roman Catholic priest.

== Life ==
He was son of Edmund Colleton of Milverton, Somerset, where he was born. He was sent to the University of Oxford in 1565, and studied at Lincoln College. A convert to Catholicism when about twenty years of age, he went to Leuven with the intention of becoming a Carthusian monk, and entered the novitiate; but did not proceed further. He then went to the English College, Douai, where he was admitted 14 January 1576.

Colleton was ordained priest at Binche on 11 June 1576, and sent on the English mission on 19 July. He was a priest in England till 1581, when he was taken prisoner, arraigned and tried with Edmund Campion and others for conspiring abroad against the queen and government. The indictment charged them with having concerted an invasion and compassed the queen's death by a conspiracy carried on at Reims and at Rome; but Colleton was acquitted. He was then kept a prisoner in the Tower of London till 1584, when he was exiled with 71 other priests.

Colleton arrived at the English College, then temporarily at Reims, on 3 March 1585, and left it on 24 April 1585. He remained abroad till 1587, when he returned to England on the mission, and lived for the most part in London and Kent. Colleton sided with the secular clergy in the Wisbech Stirs, the dispute involving the Jesuits at Wisbech Castle in 1595; and he was associated with John Mush in an attempt to unite the English Catholic clergy. He was one of the thirteen priests who signed the protestation of allegiance to Queen Elizabeth in 1602; and he opposed the appointment and the administration of the archpriest George Blackwell.

Later he was made archdeacon by George Birkhead, the next archpriest, and when he died filled the position until William Harrison was appointed. In 1610, when the gaols were filled with priests and laymen who had refused to take the oath of allegiance, Colleton was in The Clink prison in Southwark, and petitioned for his liberty to the king.

When William Bishop as bishop of Chalcedon came to England in 1623 and erected a chapter, Colleton was constituted dean of the English clergy and also the bishop's vicar-general. On 22 November 1624 he wrote to Pope Urban VIII, requesting a dispensation for the marriage of Prince Charles with Henrietta Maria. Since his health was poor, George Musket, archdeacon of Surrey and Middlesex, was appointed as coadjutor to Colleton in February 1626.

Colleton spent the end of his life in the house of Sir William Roper at Eltham in Kent, where he died on 19 October 1635, aged 87.

== Works ==
His works are:

- ‘A Ivst Defence of the Slandered Priestes: Wherein the reasons of their bearing off to receiue Maister Blackwell to their Superiour before the arriuall of his Holines Breue are layed downe ... Newly imprinted 1602,’ sine loco.
- A supplication to the king of Great Britain for a toleration of the catholic religion.
- Epistle to Pope Paul V.
