= John Mush =

English Roman Catholic priest

John Mush (alias Ratcliffe) (b. in Yorkshire, 1551 or 1552; d. at Wenge, Buckinghamshire, 1612 or 1613) was an English Roman Catholic priest, the confessor to Margaret Clitherow.

== Life ==
Having spent six months in the English College at Douai, he went to Rome (1576) where he studied for seven years. Ordained priest, he returned to England (1583) and laboured at York, being confessor, to Margaret Clitherow who was executed for harbouring him, and Francis Ingleby. Arrested 28 October 1586, and condemned to die, he escaped with two other priests.

For many years he worked on mission in the North, becoming a recognized leader among his brother priests. When the dissensions among the imprisoned priests at Wisbech Castle broke out in 1595 (the so-called "Wisbech Stirs"), he with Dr. Dudley went there to arbitrate. Failing in this, together with John Colleton he set himself to devise some organization of a voluntary character among the clergy which might supply the want of episcopal government much felt after the death of Cardinal William Allen in 1594. Opposed by Robert Persons, it was rendered superfluous by the appointment of an archpriest (1599).

In the ensuing archpriest controversy Mush was one of the appellant clergy who appealed to Rome against the archpriest. Against the Adversus factiosos in ecclesia circulated by Thomas Lister, Mush wrote Declaratio Motuum (1601) collecting documentation, and in 1602, with Anthony Champney, Bluet and Cecil, went as a deputation to Rome where for eight months they fought for their petition. Their petition, first for six bishops and then for six archpriests, was refused; but though the archpriest succeeded in maintaining his position, the appellants were acquitted of the charges of rebellion and schism.

On his return to England, Mush was one of the thirteen priests who signed the protestation of allegiance to Elizabeth I of England (1603). In his later years he acted as assistant to two successive archpriests, George Blackwell and George Birkhead, in Yorkshire, but he seems to have been acting as chaplain to Lady Dormer in Buckinghamshire at the time of his death.

== Works ==
His works are:

- The Life and Death of Mistress Margaret Clitherow (written 1586, first printed 1849);
- An account of the sufferings of Catholics in the Northern Parts or England (probably the same as the MS. account printed by John Morris in Troubles of our Catholic Forefathers, series iii);
- Declaratio Motuum (Rouen, 1601).

His diary of the deputation to Rome in 1602 was preserved in manuscript, in the Inner Temple, London. Dodd also says he wrote against the apostate priest Thomas Bell, and John Pitts quotes his English translation of Lectiones Panagorali Turini, but these works are not now known to exist.
