= George Leyburn =

English Catholic priest

George Leyburn (1597 – 29 December 1677) was an English Catholic priest, who became President of the English College, Douai.

== Life ==
From an ancient Westmoreland family, Leyburn was a great-grandson of Sir James Leyburn, MP for Westmorland under Henry VIII. His uncle James Leyburn was executed as a Catholic traitor in Lancaster in 1583. He was admitted a student in the English College at Douai on 13 March 1617, under the name of George Bradley. He studied philosophy under Thomas White, and was ordained priest on 5 August 1625. Subsequently, he lived in Arras College, Paris, and in 1630 went on the English mission. On landing at Dover he was arrested and committed to Dover Castle; but he obtained his liberty through the intercession of Queen Henrietta Maria, who made him one of her chaplains. She consulted him on matters relating to Catholics, until she was obliged by an Order in Council to dismiss all the ecclesiastics in her household.

Leyburn was then imprisoned, and after being again released at the queen's request, he went back to Douai College, where he was employed in teaching philosophy and divinity. At this period he was created D.D. by the University of Reims. Shortly before the English Civil War broke out, he returned to England, and in 1644 he was a prisoner in the Tower of London; there he met George Monck, and foretold that he would be a general in the north, and would eventually command the three kingdoms. On his release Leyburn returned to France, where he supported the royalist party. In 1647 he was sent to Ireland, with credentials from the court in exile, in order to bring about a better understanding between the two Catholic armies and James Butler, Duke of Ormonde.

In 1648 Richard Smith, bishop of Chalcedon, then residing at Paris, appointed Leyburn his vicar-general in England, in conjunction with Mark Harrington, B.D., of the Sorbonne. Later Leyburn was chosen president of the English College at Douai, on the death of William Hyde, and was installed by patent dated 24 June 1652. He governed the college for about eighteen years, resigning the presidency in favour of his nephew, John Leyburn, in 1670. Subsequently, he resided at Rome for a year and a half. He died at Chalon-sur-Saône on 29 December 1677. Throughout his life he was hostile to the jurisdiction of the Old Chapter in England.

== Works ==
- ‘The Memoirs of George Leyburn … Being a Journal of his Agency for Prince Charles in Ireland in the year 1647,’ appeared at London in 1722.
- ‘The Summe of Doctor Leyburnes Answere to a Letter printed against him by Mr. Blacloe’ [Thomas White], Douay, 1657, pp. 42.
- ‘A Letter written by G. L. to Mr. And. Kingh. and Mr. Tho. Med.’ [Douay, 1657].
- ‘To Her Most Excellent Maiestie Henrietta Maria, Queen of Great Britaign, Dr. Leyburn's Apologie’ [Douay? 1660?].
- ‘Dr. Leyburns Encyclicall Answer to an Encyclicall Epistle sent to our Brethren of England,’ Douay, 1661, 4to, pp. 96. This was in reply to ‘An Encyclical Epistle sent to their Brethren by the Venerable Dean and Chapter of the Catholick Clergy in England upon occasion of Dr. Leyburn’ [1660]. There also appeared ‘A Manifest Publisht to their Brethren by the General Chapter of the Catholick English Clergy. In Vindication of their Innocency from the false calumnies laid upon them in a seditious libel publisht by Dr. Leyburn’ [1661].
- ‘Vindiciæ censuræ Duacenæ; seu confutatio scripti cujusdam Thomæ Albii [White] contra latam à S. facultate theologica Duacena in 22 propositiones ejus censuram,’ Douay, 1661. Dodd says that some attribute the authorship of this book to John Warner.
- ‘Holy Characters,’ 2 parts, Douay, 1662.
