= John Cecil (priest) =

English Roman Catholic priest and spy

The Reverend John Cecil

Orders
- Ordination: April 1584

Personal details
- Born: 1558 Worcester, England
- Died: 21 December 1626 (aged 68) Paris, France
- Denomination: Roman Catholic
- Education: Trinity College, Oxford; University of Paris

John Cecil, alias John Snowden (1558 – 1626) was an English Roman Catholic priest, diplomat, spy and political adventurer.

== Biography ==
=== Education ===
John Cecil was born in 1558 of parents who lived at Worcester. He was educated at Trinity College, Oxford, became a Roman Catholic, joined the seminary at Rheims in August 1583, and in April of the following year, when he was twenty-six years of age, passed to the English College, Rome, where he received holy orders. For eighteen months (1587–8) he acted as Latin secretary to Cardinal Allen, and afterwards spent two years in Spain, and was with Father Parsons at his newly erected seminary at Valladolid.

=== Diplomacy ===
==== England and Scotland ====
Early in 1591 Parsons sent Cecil, with another priest, Fixer, alias Wilson, into England, via Amsterdam; but the vessel in which they sailed was captured by her Majesty's ship Hope in the Channel, and the two priests were carried to London. Here they at once came to terms with Lord Burghley. Cecil had already in 1588 corresponded, under the name of Juan de Campo, with Sir Francis Walsingham. He now declared that although he and his companion had been entrusted with treasonable commissions by Parsons, in preparation for a fresh attack upon England by the Spanish forces, they nevertheless detested all such practices, and had resolved to reveal them to the Government at the first opportunity. Cecil hoped to obtain liberty of conscience for Catholic priests who eschewed politics, and, with the view of helping to distinguish loyal from disloyal clergy, he willingly undertook to serve the Queen as secret informer, provided that he was not compelled to betray Catholic as Catholic, or priest as priest. On this understanding he was sent, at his own request, into Scotland. For the next ten years this clever adventurer contrived, without serious difficulty, to combine the characters of a zealous missionary priest, a political agent of the Scottish Catholic earls in rebellion against the King, and a spy in the employment of Burghley and Sir Robert Cecil. In Scotland he resided generally with Lord Seton, and acted as confessor or spiritual director of Barclay of Ladyland.

==== Spain ====
When George Kerr was captured, on his starting for Spain with the "Spanish Blanks", 31 December 1592, there were found among his papers letters from John Cecil to Cardinal Allen and to Parsons, assuring them of his constant adherence to the Catholic faith and of his sufferings in consequence, also a letter from Robert Scott to Parsons, referring indeed to some false rumours in circulation to the discredit of Cecil, but recommending him to the Jesuit on account of "his probity and the good service he had done in the vineyard". Three months later the Catholic lords, when hard pressed by King James, sent Cecil on a diplomatic mission to Parsons in Spain. Here he was welcomed by his former friend and patron, who unsuspectingly introduced him to Juan d'Idiaquez as "a good man who had suffered for the cause". For greater secrecy Parsons sent him disguised as a soldier, and told Idiaquez that he must give him money to get back to Scotland. In the statement regarding the projects of the Scottish lords laid before Idiaquez by Cecil, he describes himself as "a pupil of the seminary of Valladolid". All this time he was in constant communication with Sir Robert Cecil and Sir Francis Drake, who seemed to place some value on his services, and in 1594 he boasted to the Earl of Essex of all he had done, and how he had discovered the plots of Catholics by bringing their letters to Burghley.

In October 1594 Cecil was again sent into Spain by the Earls of Angus and Errol to represent to King Philip the condition of Catholics in Scotland, and to solicit his aid. He made no secret of this mission to Sir Robert Cecil; for, writing to him, 30 (?) December 1595, he says: "When last in Spain I gave such satisfaction that I was employed by the contrary party to give information of the estate of Scotland, and to see if the King of Spain would be brought to do anything to succour the nobility there and in Ireland." He tells that he had handed over to Drake letters of Parsons and Sir Francis Englefield, adding: "I am again ready to serve you, always reserving my own conscience. Not a leaf shall wag in Scotland but you shall know."

In 1596 Cecil was once more in Spain, commissioned by the Catholic earls to follow up and to countermine the diplomatic intrigues of John Ogilby of Poury, who had, or pretended to have, a secret mission from James to seek the friendship and alliance of Philip, and to assure the King and the Pope of his own Catholic sympathies and proclivities. Cecil met Ogilvy at Rome, where the two men endeavoured to overreach each other at the Papal Court and with the Duke of Sesa, with whom they had frequent interviews. They then journeyed together into Spain, and in May and June they presented to Philip at Toledo their several memorials, Cecil attacking Ogilvy, and demonstrating the hostility of James to the Catholic religion and its adherents, and the falsity of all his Catholic pretences. This exposure of the Scottish King enraged Father William Crichton, the aged Jesuit, who, in opposition to the policy of Father Parsons, had constantly upheld James's claim to succeed to the English throne. He accordingly wrote anonymously, and disseminated in manuscript An Apologie and Defence of the K. of Scotlande against the infamous libell forged by John Cecill, English Priest, Intelligencer to Treasurer Cecill of England. To this Cecil, who had received about this time the degree of Doctor of Divinity from the University of Paris or of Cahors, replied in the rare tract, of which the copy in the British Library is probably unique; it is entitled A Discoverie of the errors committed and inivryes don his M.A. off Scotlande and Nobilitye off the same realme, and Iohn Cecyll, Pryest and D. off diuinitye by a malitious Mythologie titled an Apologie and cõpiled by William Criton, Pryest and professed Iesuite, whose habit and behauioure, whose cote and cõditions, are as sutable as Esau his hādes, and Iacob his voice. The preface is dated "from the monastery of Montmartre", 10 August 1599. The writer, indignant at being stigmatised as "intelligencer" to the English government, declares that it was done to ruin him, and that, as he is about to pass into Scotland, the charge might be his death.

==== France and Rome ====
At the end of 1601 Cecil was in France, and apparently in company with Robert Bruce; for Cardinal d'Ossat, writing from Rome, 26 November, warns Villeroi against both men as spies acting on behalf of Spain. D'Ossat may have been misinformed on this point with regard to Cecil. In any case, two months later this versatile diplomatist appears in quite another company. When the four deputies of the English appellant priests, John Mush, Bluet, Anthony Champney, and Barneby, were starting on their journey to Rome to lay before the Pope their grievances against the archpriest Blackwell and the Jesuits, Dr. Cecil unexpectedly took the place of Barneby in the deputation; and fortified with testimonials from the French government, in spite of D'Ossat's warnings, he for the next nine months assumed a leading part in the proceedings with the Pope and cardinals: proceedings in which one of the main charges brought against the Jesuits was their improper meddling with the affairs of state. Parsons now in vain denounced Cecil to the Pope as a swindler, a forger, a spy, the friend of heretics, and the betrayer of his brethren; for as the Jesuit had made similar or more incredible accusations against all his other opponents, the charges were disbelieved or disregarded by the papal court. Cecil had several favourable audiences of the Pope, and his ability and tact gained for him great credit with the clerical party, to whose cause he had attached himself. It is probably to his pen that we owe the Brevis Relatio, or formal account of the proceedings in the case at Rome. In 1606 he was chosen, together with Dr. Champney, to present to the Pope the petition of a number of English priests for episcopal government. The indignant Parsons again denounced his adversary, and desired that he might be seized and put upon his trial, but Dr. Cecil remained unharmed in fortune or character.

=== Later life and death ===
He for some time held the appointment of chaplain and almoner to Margaret of Valois, the divorced wife of Henry IV, and settled down to a quiet life. There are even indications that he became friendly with the Jesuits. He handed over, indeed, copies of certain letters touching Garnet to the English ambassador George Carew; but he, forwarding them to Salisbury, 2 February 1607, wrote that "he [Cecil] is of late so great with Père Cotton that I dare not warrant this for clear water". He died at Paris, on 21 December 1626.

== Sources ==
- Dodd's Church History ii. 377;
- Statements and Letters of "John Snowden", Cal. State Papers, Dom. Eliz. 1591–4, pp. 38–71;
- Calderwood's History v. 14–36;
- Documents illustrating Catholic Policy. &c., viz.
1. Summary of Memorials presented to the King of Spain by John Ogilvy of Poury and Dr. John Cecil;
2. Apology and Defence of the King of Scotland by Father William Creighton, S. J., edited, with introduction, by T. G. Law, in Miscellany of the Scottish History Society 1893;
- The Archpriest Controversy (Royal Historical Society), vol. ii. passim.

== Bibliography ==
- Law, Thomas Graves (1901). "Cecil, John" . In Lee, Sidney (ed.). Dictionary of National Biography (1st supplement). Vol. 1. London: Smith, Elder & Co.
