= English post-Reformation oaths =

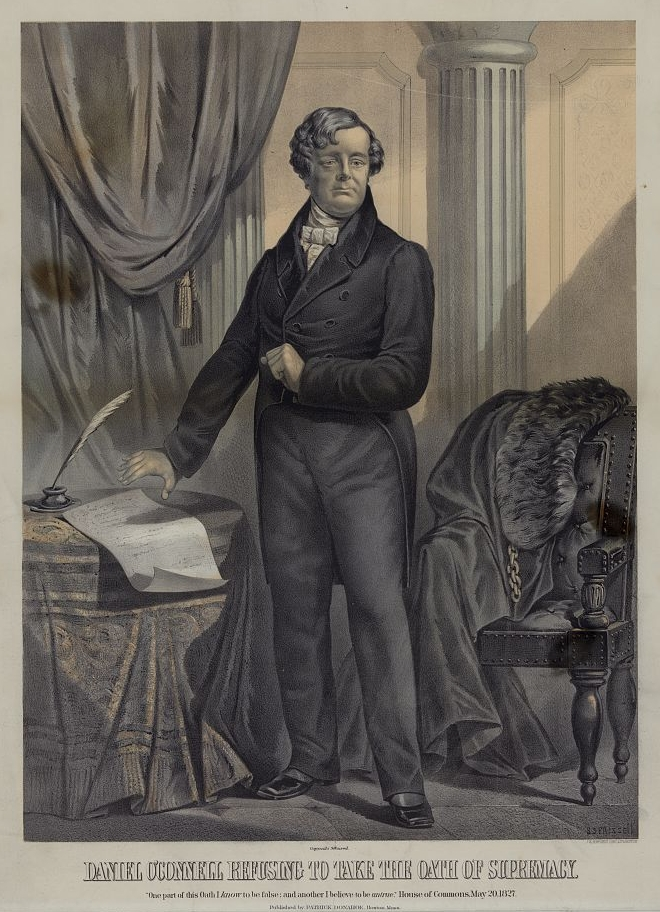
Lithograph of Daniel O'Connell refusing to take the oath of supremacy. Caption: "One part of this Oath I know to be false; and another I believe to be untrue. House of Commons, May 20, 1829."

The English Protestant Reformation was imposed by the English Crown, and submission to its essential points was exacted by the State with post-Reformation oaths. With some solemnity, by oath, test, or formal declaration, English churchmen and others were required to assent to the religious changes, starting in the sixteenth century and continuing for more than 250 years.

== Oath of Royal Supremacy (1534, renewed 1559) ==
This oath was imposed in March 1534 (Act of Supremacy 1534). The title "Supreme Head" had first been introduced by Henry VIII into a decree of Convocation, 11 February 1531; and had been resisted by the clergy. Though it did not as yet have any religious significance, and might be a matter of compliment only, it might, they feared, receive another interpretation later. But acting under the advice of John Fisher, Warham, and others, they submitted after adding the conditional phrase, quantum per legem Dei licet.

Two years later, the king had broken with the pope, and Parliament had enacted that the king should be "taken, accepted and reputed the only supreme head on Earth of the church of England" by every one of his subjects. But no formula for the oath was laid down in the Act, and great differences seem to have prevailed in practice. Many long "acknowledgments of supremacy" are extant but it would seem that most people were only asked to swear to the Succession, that is to the king's marriage with Anne Boleyn, which the pope condemned, and which therefore involved the supremacy, though the form of the Oath of Succession preserved in The Lords' Journals, refers to the supremacy only lightly. It is unclear what form of the oath Fisher and Thomas More refused to sign. They were ready to accept the succession of Anne Boleyn's children, but refused the supremacy.

The Act of Supremacy was repealed in 1554 by Queen Mary (Second Statute of Repeal) and revived by Elizabeth in 1559 (the Act of Supremacy 1558). The formula then adopted ran:

"I, A.B., do utterly testify and declare in my conscience, that the Queen's Highness is the only supreme Governor of the Realm . . . as well in all Spiritual or Ecclesiastical things or causes as Temporal, &c. &c. &c. So help me God."

This was not to be proposed at once to every one; but was to be taken by the clergy, and by all holding office under the Crown; by others, when asked. This moderation in exacting the oath helped to prevent an outcry against it, and enabled the Government to deal with the recalcitrant in detail. Many years elapsed, for instance, before it was imposed on the graduates of the universities. The last laws passed by Elizabeth against Catholics (1592-3) enjoined a new test for Recusants (Popish Recusants Act 1592). It comprised (1) A confession of "grievous offence against God in contemning her Majesty's Government"; (2) Royal Supremacy; (3) A clause against dispensations and dissimulations, perhaps the first of its sort in oaths of this class.

Elizabeth's "settlement of religion" (see Elizabethan Religious Settlement) had included compromise with the Puritan party, as they were to become, and they were not in love with the supremacy. An informal test was used, asking the suspected person whether he would fight against the pope, if he sent an army to restore Catholicism. The Catholics called this the "bloody question". There was no law to enforce an answer and no specific penalty for refusal.

Towards the end of Elizabeth's reign, a split began in the Catholic ranks on this subject. Some of the priests who had joined in the Archpriest Controversy and appeal against the archpriest George Blackwell had afterwards presented to Elizabeth a "Protestation of Allegiance". This was not the first example of such a declaration of loyalty, but it was the first which withheld from the pope any possible exercise of the deposing power, rather than simply denying the validity of the deposition pronounced by Pius V.

== Oath of Abjuration under the Commonwealth (1643) ==
When the Puritan party had gained the upper hand during the civil wars, the exaction of the Oaths of Supremacy and Allegiance fell into desuetude, and they were repealed by the Act of February, 1650, and their place taken by an "engagement of allegiance" to the Commonwealth. An "Oath of Abjuration was passed 19 August 1643, and afterwards, in 1656, reissued.

Everyone was to be "adjudged a Papist" who refused this oath, and the consequent penalties began with the confiscation of two thirds of the recusant's goods, and went on to deprive him of almost every civic right. In practice the enactments were sparingly enforced. They checked the gallicanizing party among the English Catholics, which had at first been ready to offer forms of submission similar to the old oath of Allegiance, which is stated (Reusch, 335) to have been condemned anew about this time by Innocent X. The chief writer on the Catholic side was the lawyer John Austin, who generally used the pseudonym William Birchley. The oath was also used against Quakers who refused any oath.

== The Test Oath (1672, 1678) ==
(Also known as the Declaration of Attestation Oath.) The first Parliament after the Restoration revived the Oaths of Supremacy and Allegiance, which were taken on 14 July 1660. The Catholics in England being at first in some favour at Court, managed, as a rule, to escape taking it. In Ireland the old controversy was revived through an address to the Crown, called "The Irish Remonstrance", which emphasized the principles of the condemned Oath of Allegiance. It had been drawn up by a Capuchin friar (who afterwards left the order), called Peter Valesius Walsh, who published many books in its defence, which publications were eventually placed on the Index.

After the conversion of James, then Duke of York, the jealousy of the Protestant party increased, and in 1672 a Test Act was carried by Shaftesbury, which compelled all holders of office under the Crown to make a short "Declaration against Transubstantiation", viz., to swear that "there is not any transubstantiation in the sacrament of the Lord's Supper, . . . at or after the consecration thereof by any person whatsoever" (25 Chas. II, c. 2). This test was effective: James resigned his post of Lord High Admiral.

In reaction to the Popish Plot in 1678, however, a new test was devised, later known as "the King's Declaration". This test added a further clause that "The invocation of the virgin Mary, or any Saint and the Sacrifice of the Mass . . . are superstitious and idolatrous . . . and that I make this declaration without any evasion, equivocation, or mental reservation whatsoever, and without any dispensation already granted me by the pope, &c., &c. (30 Chas. II, ii. 1). It was originally appointed for office holders and the members of both Houses, except the Duke of York.

On the death of Charles, James II succeeded, and he would no doubt have gladly abolished the anti-Catholic oaths altogether. But he never had the opportunity of bringing the project before Parliament. The Oaths of Supremacy and Allegiance were less of a live issue during James's reign, but the Test was the subject of constant discussion, for its form and scope had been expressly intended to hamper a reform such as James was instituting. He freed himself, however, more or less from it by the Dispensing Power, especially after the declaration of the judges, June, 1686, that it was contrary to the principles of the constitution to prevent the Crown from using the services of any of its subjects when they were needed.

The Revolution of 1688 quickly brought the Test back into greater vogue than ever. The first Parliament summoned after the triumph of William of Orange added a clause to the Bill of Rights, which was then passed, by which the Sovereign was himself to take the Declaration (1 W. & M., sess. 1, c. 8). By this device no Catholic could ever be admitted to accept the new regime, without renouncing their faith.

== The Irish Oath of 1774 to Catholic Emancipation, 1829 ==
In 1770 John Burgoyne proposed unsuccessfully to free Catholic soldiers from the obligations of the Test. In 1774, however, it was necessary to pacify Canada, and the Quebec Act was passed, the first measure of toleration for Catholics sanctioned by Parliament since the days of the Tudor Queen Mary. Soon after began the war of American Independence, the difficulties of which gradually awakened English statesmen to the need of reconciling Catholics.

The Irish Government took the first step by undoing William III's work of joining the profession of fidelity to the sovereign with the rejection of papal authority. In 1774 an oath was proposed of allegiance to King George (§ 1) and rejection of the Pretender (§ 2), but without prejudice to the pope's spiritual authority, or to any dogma of the Faith. The alleged malpractice of "no faith with heretics" was renounced (§ 3), so was the deposing power (§ 4), but without the objectionable words, "impious, damnable and heretical." The "temporal and civil jurisdiction of the pope, direct and indirect within the realm" was also abjured (§ 5), and the promise was given that no dispensation from this oath should be considered valid (§ 6). This Irish Oath, of 1774, was accepted by the legislative authorities as proof of loyalty, and it was freely taken.

In 1778, the first Relief Bill, came before the British Parliament. It was intended to relieve the English Catholics from the worst consequences of the penal laws, and in it was embodied the Irish Oath. This bill was passed with little difficulty, as the Papists Act 1778 (18 Geo. 3. c. 60), also called Sir George Savile's Act and the oath was taken without remonstrance by the clergy of all schools.

The relief given by the bill of 1778 was so imperfect that further legislation was soon called for, and now the disadvantages of the system of tests were acutely felt. A committee of lay Catholics, with Gallican proclivities, who afterwards characteristically called themselves the Cisalpine Club entered into negotiations with the government. To them it was represented that if more concessions were required more assurances should be given. They were accordingly presented with a long "Protest", which not only rejected the alleged malpractices, already disowned by the Irish Oath, but declaimed against them and others of the same kind in strong but untheological language. It reintroduced, for instance, the objectionable terms "impious, heretical and damnable" of James's Oath of Allegiance. The committee insisted (1) that words would be understood in a broad popular way, and (2) that, to obtain the Relief Act, it must be signed instantly. To prevent such a misfortune, it was freely signed by laity and clergy, and by the four vicars Apostolic, but two of these recalled their names. When, however, the signatures had been obtained, the new Relief Bill was brought forward by Government, with an oath annexed founded on the Protest (the "Protestation Oath"), which excluded from relief those who would not swear to it, and accept the name of "Protesting Catholic Dissenters". John Milner, later a bishop, argued against it.

The Second Relief Act, therefore, passed (1791) without changing the previous oath, or the name of Catholics. Though the Emancipation Bill was eventually carried without any tests, this was not foreseen at first. The Catholic Committee continued its endeavours, but their proposals (like the Veto) often savoured of Gallicanism. So too did the oath annexed to the bill proposed in 1813, which from its length was styled the "Theological Oath". Eventually, owing to the growing influence exercised by Daniel O'Connell and the Irish, Catholic Emancipation was granted without any tests at all in 1829.

== Repeal of the Statutory Oaths against Catholicism (1867-1910) ==
The Relief Bills were generally measures of relief only, leaving the old statutes, oaths, and tests still on the Statute Book, and some of the chief officers of State had still to take them. The actual repeal of the disused tests and oaths of William III took place later.

In 1867, during the reign of Queen Victoria, the Declaration was repealed by the Office and Oath Act 1867 (30 & 31 Vict. c. 75). After this, the only person bound to pronounce the oath was the king himself at the commencement of his reign. The Promissory Oaths Act 1871 (34 & 35 Vict. c. 48) removed all the old Oaths of Allegiance. In 1891 the first attempt was made by Lord Herries in the House of Lords to get rid of the king's Declaration, but the amendments offered by the government were so insignificant that the Catholics themselves voted against their being proposed at all.

In 1901 strong resolutions were passed against its retention by the House of Commons of Canada, as also by its hierarchy, and these were emphasized by similar petitions from the hierarchies of Australia, and the Catholics of the English colonies. In 1904, 1905, and 1908 bills or motions to the same effect were introduced by Lord Braye, Lord Grey, Lord Llandaff, the Duke of Norfolk, and John Redmond, but without the desired effect. After the death of King Edward VII, however, King George V is believed to have urged the Government to bring in a repealing Act. This was done and public opinion, after some wavering, finally declared itself strongly on the side of the Bill, which was carried through both Houses by large majorities, and received Royal Assent on 3 August 1910, thus removing the last anti-Catholic oath or declaration from the English Constitution.

== See also ==
- Oath of Allegiance (United Kingdom), contemporary oath
