= John Leyburn =

English Roman Catholic Bishop

The Right Reverend John Leyburn
- Vicar Apostolic of the London District
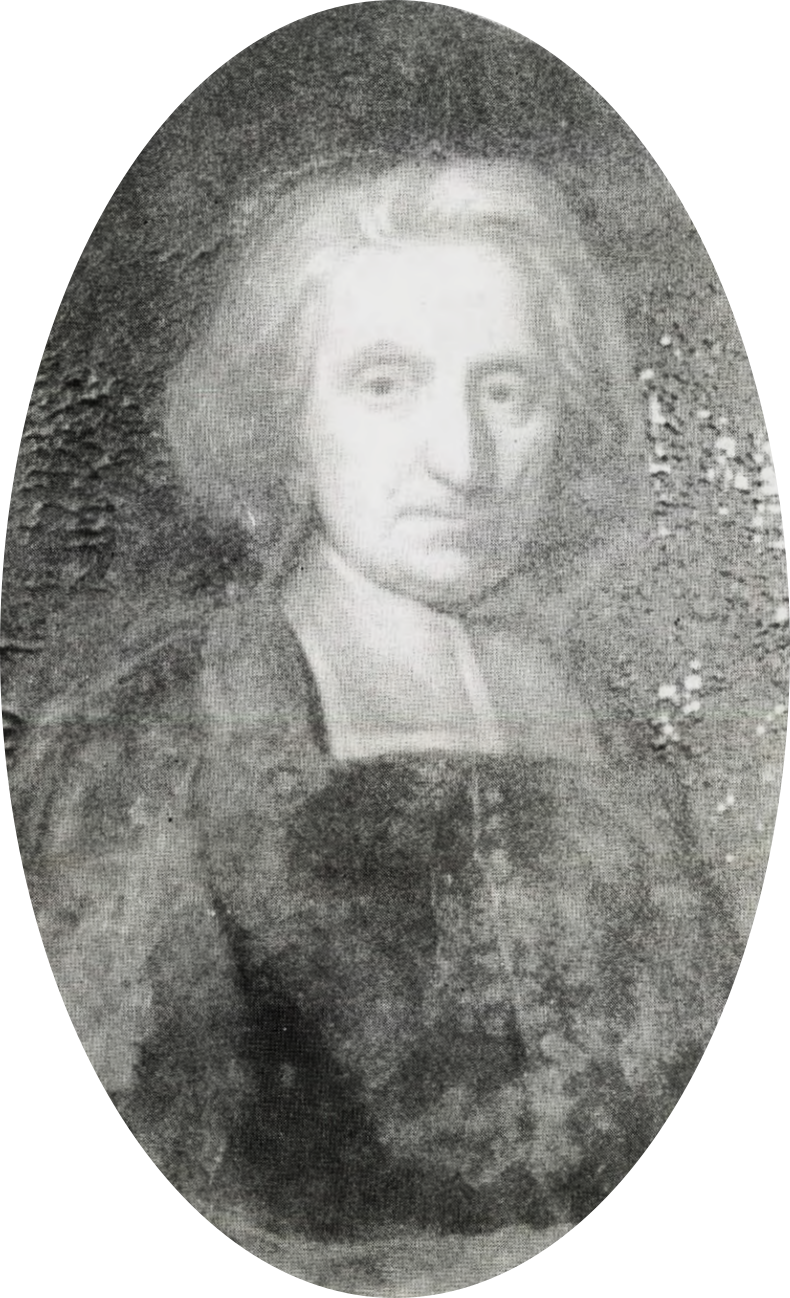
- Portrait miniature, from St Edmund's College, Ware
- Appointed: 30 January 1688
- Term ended: 20 June 1702
- Predecessor: Richard Smith
- Successor: Bonaventure Giffard
- Other post: Titular Bishop of Adramyttium
- Previous post: Vicar Apostolic of England (1685–1688)

Orders
- Consecration: 9 September 1685 by Federico Baldeschi Colonna

Personal details
- Born: 1615 Cunswick, near Kendal, Westmorland
- Died: 20 June 1702 (aged 86–87) London
- Denomination: Roman Catholic
- Parents: John Leyburn and Catharine Carr
- Education: English College, Douai

John Leyburn (1615 – 20 June 1702) was an English Catholic prelate who served as Vicar Apostolic of England from 1685 to 1688 and as Vicar Apostolic of the London District from 1688 to 1702. He was not only a theologian but also a mathematician and an intimate friend of René Descartes and Thomas Hobbes.

== Life ==
He was the fourth son of John Leyburn and Catharine Carr, nephew of George Leyburn, and descended from Westmorland MP Sir James Leyburn. He was educated at the English College, Douai, where he was admitted a student on 20 June 1633. He received holy orders in 1646, and was engaged for some time in teaching the classics in the college.

Richard Smith had served as chaplain to Viscountess Montague, wife of Anthony-Maria Browne, 2nd Viscount Montagu, at Battle Abbey in Sussex, from 1603 to 1609, when he left to go to Paris to study and write at Arras College. Smith was appointed Apostolic Vicar for the whole of England, Wales and Scotland in 1625, the same year that George Leyburn went to Arras. When Smith returned to England, he stayed in Turvey, Bedfordshire, at the house of Lord Montagu. In 1628 a warrant was issued for his arrest. He resigned his post in 1631, when he fled to Paris. After his ordination, Leyburn was, for a time, secretary to Bishop Smith.

During the time of the English Civil War Leyburn was tutor to Francis Browne, eldest son of Viscount Montague, and made the Grand Tour with his pupil, who later became the 4th Viscount Montagu. For about twelve years he resided in England as domestic chaplain in the family of Lord Montague, whose family home was at Cowdray House. (During the Civil War two thirds of the Cowdray estate was sequestered from the 3rd Viscount Montagu, and the house was garrisoned by Parliamentary forces.)

Bishop Smith had resigned as Apostolic Vicar when he fled to France in 1631. The position remained vacant for some time, during which the church was governed by the Old Chapter, a body of archdeacons and deans created by Smith's predecessor, William Bishop, as a standing council for his own assistance, with power, during the vacancy of the see, to exercise episcopal ordinary jurisdiction. The Chapter was an anomaly in canon law; and Rome neither recognized nor censured it. The Chapter understood this lack of condemnation as implied consent. Unlike his uncle, John Leyburn regarded the Old Chapter as validly erected, and confirmed by the Holy See, and became its Secretary.

Leyburn was one of the divines recommended to the authorities at Rome in 1657 as successor to Richard Smith, Titular Bishop of Chalcedon, as Vicar Apostolic of England.

He was appointed President of the English College at Douai, that post being surrendered to him by his uncle George Leyburn, in May 1670. He resigned the presidency in 1676, and went to Rome, when he became secretary and auditor to Cardinal Philip Howard. In a particular congregation for English affairs held in the Quirinal Palace on 6 August 1685, the Propaganda, on the relation of the Cardinal, elected Leyburn vicar-apostolic of all England, and the pope gave his approbation the same day. He was consecrated at Rome on 9 September, with the title of bishop of Adramyttiumin partibus. In the following month he arrived in London, and James II lodged him in St. James's Palace, and allowed him a pension of £1,000 a year. With him came Ferdinando d'Adda, as papal nuncio. He made a pastoral visitation of the kingdom, administering confirmation to many people, for there had been no catholic bishop resident in England since 1629. During his residence at court he was on terms of intimacy with Thomas Cartwright, bishop of Chester.

Leyburn tried to moderate James II's zeal for the Catholic cause, and he told the king that the fellows and students of Magdalen College, Oxford had been wronged, and that restitution ought to be made to them on religious as well as political grounds. In 1688, England was divided into four apostolic vicariates, the London, the Midland, the Northern, and the Western districts; Leyburne was named Vicar Apostolic of the London District, the senior position. He became the first vicar-apostolic of the London district, created by letters apostolic of 30 January 1688.

When the Glorious Revolution broke out, Leyburn and Bonaventure Giffard were seized at Faversham on their way to Dover, and were under arrest when the king was brought there. Both prelates were committed to prison, Leyburn being sent to the Tower of London. On 9 July 1690, he and Giffard were liberated on bail by the court of queen's bench, on condition that they transported themselves beyond sea before the last day of the following month. Afterwards he was frequently alarmed and summoned when any disturbance happened in relation to the government, but eventually the ministry took no further notice of him, and only desired to be made acquainted from time to time with his place of abode. He died in London on 9 June 1702, and was succeeded in the vicariate-apostolic of the London district by Giffard.

== Works ==
Leyburn translated into Latin Sir Kenelm Digby's treatise on the soul, under the title of ‘Demonstratio Immortalitatis Animæ Rationalis,’ Paris, 1651 and 1655. With Giffard, P. Ellis, and James Smith he published ‘A Pastoral Letter from the four Catholic Bishops to the Lay-Catholics of England’ (on the re-establishment of Catholic episcopal authority in England), London, 1688, 1747.

== Notes ==
Attribution

Catholic Church titles
Preceded by Richard Smith	Vicar Apostolic of England; 1685–1688	Divided into four districts
New title	Vicar Apostolic of the London District; 1688–1702	Succeeded by Bonaventure Giffard
Court offices
Preceded by Francis Turner	Lord High Almoner; 1687	Succeeded by Philip Howard
