= James Smith (vicar-apostolic of the Northern District) =

English prelate

James Smith (1645–1711) was an English Roman Catholic prelate, Vicar-Apostolic of the Northern District under James II of England.

== Life ==
Born at Winchester in 1645, he was the second son of Bartholomew and Frances Smith of Stoke Charity. Smith was educated at the English College, Douai, and was created D.D. on 5 February 1680. He was appointed President of Douai College, in succession to Francis Gage, on 28 August 1682, and while in that post he inherited a large estate from his father (most of which he granted to a younger brother).

In 1687 he was nominated by James II to be one of the four vicars-apostolic of England, each of whom had an annual stipend of £1,000. He was elected by the Propaganda Fide on 12 January 1687, and was consecrated at Somerset House on 13 May 1688 as titular bishop of Calliopolis. After his consecration he went to his vicariate, arriving on 2 August at York, where he was received by the secular and regular clergy, who sang the Te Deum. In one of his visitations Smith was deprived of his large crozier by Thomas Osborne, Earl of Danby, who deposited it in York Minster.

On the flight of the king, Smith left York and sought refuge in the house of Francis Tunstall of Wycliffe, who gave him hospitality and protection till the time of his death. At different times, Smith assumed the aliases of Brown, Harper, and Tarlton to avoid the penal laws. In 1700 it was contemplated that he should be promoted to the cardinalate and to the office of Protector of England, which had been vacant since the death of Cardinal Howard; the Duke of Berwick and Dr. George Witham were commissioned from St. Germain to solicit this appointment from Clement XI. Upon the death of John Leyburn in 1702, Smith was solicited for the London District, but expressed his reluctance to accept and recommended instead Bonaventure Giffard.

Smith died at Wycliffe on 13 May 1711 at the age of 66. Silvester Jenks was appointed to succeed Smith as Vicar Apostolic of the Northern District, but died before his consecration.

== Works ==
His name is subscribed to ‘A Pastoral Letter from the four Catholic Bishops to the Lay Catholics of England,’ on the re-establishment of Catholic episcopal authority in England, London, 1688 and 1747.

Catholic Church titles
New title	Vicar Apostolic of the Northern District; 1688–1711	Succeeded by George Witham
