= Robert Drury (priest) =

English Roman Catholic priest and martyr

Blessed Robert Drury
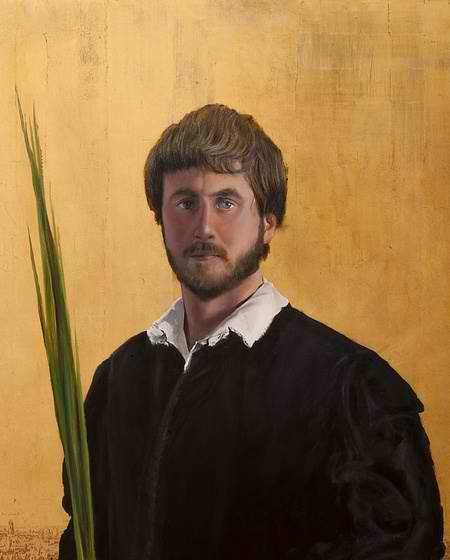

Priest and Martyr
- Born: c. 1567; Buckinghamshire, England
- Died: 26 February 1607 (aged 39 - 40); Tyburn, London, England
- Honored in: Roman Catholic Church
- Beatified: 22 November 1987 by Pope John Paul II
- Feast: 26 February (individual); 22 November (one of the Eighty-five martyrs of England and Wales); 29 October (one of the Douai Martyrs)

Robert Drury (1567–1607) was an English Roman Catholic priest, executed for treason. He is a Catholic martyr, beatified in 1987.

== Life ==
He was born of a Buckinghamshire family, presumably the younger son of Robert Drury of Hedgerley and Chalfont St. Peter.

He was received into the English College at Reims, 1 April 1588. On 17 September 1590, he was sent to the new college at Valladolid; here he finished his studies, was ordained priest and returned to England in 1593. He worked on his mission chiefly in London, and often stayed at a safe house where Anne Line sheltered priests.

He was one of the appellants against the archpriest George Blackwell, and his name is affixed to the appeal of 17 November 1600, dated from Wisbech Castle. An invitation from the English Government to these priests to acknowledge their allegiance and duty to the queen (dated 5 November 1602) led to the loyal address of 31 January 1603, drawn up by Dr. William Bishop, and signed by thirteen of the leading priests, including Drury and Roger Cadwallader.

In this address they acknowledged the queen as their lawful sovereign, repudiated the claim of the pope to release them from their duty of allegiance to her, and expressed their abhorrence of the forcible attempts already made to restore the Catholic religion and their determination to reveal any further conspiracies against the Government which should come to their knowledge. In return they pleaded that as they were ready to render to Caesar the things that were Caesar's, so they might be permitted to yield to the successor of Peter that obedience which Peter himself might have claimed under the commission of Christ, and so to distinguish between their several duties and obligations as to be ready on the one hand "to spend their blood in defence of her Majesty", but on the other "rather to lose their lives than infringe the lawful authority of Christ's Catholic Church".

This repudiation of the papal deposing power was condemned by the theological faculty of the Catholic University of Leuven; but Dr. William Bishop was in the end nominated Bishop of Chalcedon and first vicar Apostolic in England in 1623.

Elizabeth I of England died within three months of the signature of the address, and James I of England was not satisfied with purely civil allegiance. A new oath of allegiance was drawn up. It was imposed 5 July 1606, and about this time Drury was arrested. He was condemned for his priesthood, but was offered his life if he would take the new oath. A letter from Father Robert Persons, S.J., against its lawfulness was found on him. The oath declared that the "damnable doctrine" of the deposing power was "impious and heretical", and it was condemned by Pope Paul V, 22 September 1606, "as containing many things contrary to the Faith and Salvation". This brief, however, was suppressed by the archpriest, and Drury probably did not know of it. But he felt that his conscience would not permit him to take the oath. He refused to save his life by taking the new oath, and died a Catholic martyr at Tyburn, 26 February 1606–7.

A contemporary account of his martyrdom, entitled "A true Report of the Arraignment . . . of a Popish Priest named Robert Drewrie" (London, 1607), which has been reprinted in the "Harleian Miscellany", calls him a Benedictine, and says he wore his monastic habit at the execution. But this "habit" as described proves to be the cassock and cap work by the secular clergy. The writer adds, "There were certain papers shown at Tyburn which had been found about him, of a very dangerous and traitorous nature, and among them also was his Benedictine faculty under seal, expressing what power and authority he had from the pope to make men, women, and children here of his order; what indulgence and pardons he could grant them", etc. He may have been a confrater or oblate of the order.

== See also ==
- Douai Martyrs
