= Appellants =

Appellants may refer to:

- ones making an appeal in a court of law
- the Lords Appellant who charged the king of England's favourites with treason (1386–1388)
- those who appealed to the pope during the Archpriest Controversy (1598–1603)
- those Jansenists who appealed to the pope against their condemnation (1713)
