= Lettice Mary Tredway =

English canoness regular and abbess

Mother Lettice Mary Tredway, C.R.L., (1595 – October 1677), courtesy title Lady Tredway, was an English canoness regular and abbess who founded a monastery for the English members of her Order in 17th-century Europe.

== Life ==
In July 1616, Tredway entered the novitiate of the Canonesses Regular of the Lateran at their Priory of Notre-Dame-de-Beaulieu in the village of Sin-le-Noble, near Douai, in the County of Flanders, which had been established in the 13th century as a hostel for travellers and the sick. She was probably educated there, and in October 1617, made her solemn profession of vows as a member of the community.

In 1631 she and Miles Pinkney, better known as Father Carre, a priest of the English College at Douai, conceived the project of opening a monastery of canonesses for English subjects only at Douai. The idea was approved by the Catholic authorities at home and abroad, and in 1634 it was decided to open this English priory at Paris.

Bishop Richard Smith, who was charged with the spiritual care of the Catholics of Great Britain, then in exile in Paris, helped them generously and may be counted a co-founder. He blessed Lady Tredway as abbess, and the Priory of Notre-Dame-de-Sion was permanently established on the Rue des Fosses in 1639. Carre and Tredway were also practically the founders of the Seminary of St. Gregory (now Downside Abbey) for training priests for the English mission. A pension for English ladies and a school were attached to the new monastery, of which Tredway held the office of abbess till 1675, when illness compelled her to resign.

After her death the superiors of the priory held the title of prioress, as is customary for communities of Augustinian canonesses.

The priory which Tredway established continued in operation, along with the school attached to it, until the French Revolution, when the English canonesses were finally forced to flee. They returned to their homeland, where they found that they were able to live out their life as a religious community. Eventually the community established itself as St Augustine's Priory, Ealing.

== Family ==
Mother Mary was the daughter of Sir Walter Tredway, of Buckley Park in Northamptonshire; her mother was Elizabeth Weyman.

== Attribution ==
The entry cites:

- François-Marie Cédoz, Un couvent de religieuses anglaises (1891)
- Leo Almond, Les dames anglaises (Paris, 1911).
