= Archpriest Controversy =

16th-century conflict in the Roman Catholic Church

The Archpriest Controversy was the debate which followed the appointment of an archpriest by Pope Clement VIII to oversee the efforts of the Roman Catholic Church's missionary priests in England at the end of the sixteenth century.

The discussion became an acrimonious church intrigue, active approximately from 1598 to 1603. The English government saw advantage in its continuation and supported the appellants or opponents of the archpriest; the controversy is also widely known as the Appellant Controversy. It produced a rich pamphlet literature. Interpretations of its underlying substance have differed: one question to the fore was the allegiance of recusants to the English crown, but it is now argued that internal church matters were central. Other factors were the role of the Jesuits in the English mission and tensions between Catholic clerics and laymen.

== Background ==
At the time, under Queen Elizabeth I's Protestant religious settlement, the Roman Catholic faith suffered legal disabilities. Foreign powers, most notably Spain and France, supported the training of English Catholic clergy on the European mainland. These priests came principally from two backgrounds: Jesuits and seminary priests. The seminary priests were trained at the English College, Douai in Northern France, an establishment set up by Cardinal Allen and associated to the University of Douai.

The root of the controversy stemmed from two different views of the state of the Roman Catholic Church in post-Reformation England. The Jesuits saw England as a missionary field, almost a clean slate, while many of the secular clergy saw their church's survival as a continuation of the institutions of the past. There were also suspicions in England that Jesuit missionaries supported Spanish foreign-policy aims, endangering English Catholics through their political entanglements

== Appointment of Blackwell ==
In 1598, some four years after the death of Cardinal William Allen in 1594, the Cardinal Protector of England appointed an archpriest to oversee the mission in England, with the permission of Pope Clement VIII. Enrico Caetani had taken on the role of Cardinal Protector, given that the obvious successor to Allen in terms of involvement in the English mission, Robert Parsons, was not broadly acceptable. There were early misgivings about Caetani's choice, however. The archpriest was to have authority over all secular clergy in England, and George Blackwell was chosen: he was close to the Jesuits, and his letter of appointment included instructions to co-operate with them. The new nuncio in Brussels was Ottavio Mirto Frangipani who had jurisdiction over the archpriest, and he believed the arrangement gave excessive control to the Jesuits. At the same time, Richard Barret was given control of secular priests in the Spanish Netherlands other than those answerable to the nuncio there, and was told to co-operate with Blackwell, and to act against disruptive English priests.

== Resistance to Blackwell ==
Affronted, and fearing their loss of independence, a vocal minority of seminary priests refused Blackwell's authority. William Bishop and Robert Charnock travelled to Rome to represent their views and appeal against Blackwell's appointment. They arrived in December 1598; but Parsons had them arrested; and the Pope excluded Bishop from both Rome and England. Some of the seminary priests supported Blackwell, with others continuing to appeal to Rome for his removal. The latter group came to be known as "Appellants". Their leaders included Christopher Bagshaw, Thomas Bluet, John Colleton, the layman Anthony Copley, John Mush and William Watson. Bagshaw and Parsons had been at odds since 1574. Henry Constable, a poet and theological polemicist, was a prominent lay Catholic advocate for the appellant side.

The approach taken in appealing against Blackwell changed over the space of about four years. The first appeal of 1598/9 was quite clumsy. In 1602 negotiations were backed by a decision of the French theologians of the Sorbonne, and had much greater success. As framed by Thomas Graves Law, the controversy turned on Blackwell's relationship to the Jesuits as laid down by Caetani, and this was the central thrust of the appeal of 1600. It was dated 17 November 1600 from Wisbech (where in Wisbech Castle around 30 priests were interned).

== Official resolution ==
In 1602, the Pope settled the quarrel by reaffirming Blackwell's authority in a brief of 11 October, but making concessions to the Appellants. He ordered that the next three vacancies among Blackwell's assistants were to be filled from among the Appellants, and he rescinded the instruction that Blackwell was to consult with the Jesuits, instead forbidding such consultation. Relations between the two factions of seminary priests then improved; though there was an attempt to make out the fine print of the brief to disadvantage three appellant clergy (Bluet, Watson and William Clark).

== The Protestation of Allegiance ==
Some Appellants went to the Queen, requesting religious toleration in return for their declaring allegiance to her and for her expelling the Jesuits from England. Seeing a chance to divide the Catholics, Elizabeth initially welcomed these approaches, and her government gave some of the Appellants access to printers during the pamphlet war. However, in 1602, disappointed at the Pope's settlement of the dispute, Elizabeth issued a proclamation accusing the Appellants of disloyalty, offering them mercy only if they gave themselves up and signed a "protestation of allegiance". Thirteen of the Appellants publicly asserted their loyalty to Elizabeth in this manner: they were Bishop, Colleton, Mush, Charnock with Roger Cadwallador and Robert Drury (future Catholic martyrs), Francis Barnaby, Anthony Champney, John Boseville, Richard Button, Anthony Hebourn, John Jackson, and Oswald Needham.

== Richard Bancroft and the Appellants ==
A bitter pamphlet war followed from the inflammatory manuscript Adversus factiosos in ecclesia circulated in 1598 by Thomas Lister.

The royal policy of helping the appellants print pamphlets was implemented by Richard Bancroft as bishop of London. Leading printers were used: Robert Barker, Thomas Creede, Richard Field, James Roberts and three others. The authors included the French writers against the Jesuits, Antoine Arnauld and Étienne Pasquier.

Bancroft cultivated his contacts with individual appellant priests. He supported Thomas Bluet's wish to travel to Rome and see Pope Clement VIII, with permission and contacts in Parliament. In September 1601 William Watson was resident at Fulham Palace, under the protection of Bancroft. Francis Barnaby was another appellant contact of Bancroft's, who communicated for him with Christopher Bagshaw, in Paris, and had worked with William Clark in writing a 1603 pamphlet against the English Jesuits.
