= John Cecil =

John Cecil may refer to:

- John Cecil (priest) (1558–1626)
- John Cecil, 4th Earl of Exeter (1628–1678)
- John Cecil, 5th Earl of Exeter (c. 1648–1700)
- John Cecil, 6th Earl of Exeter (1674–1721)
- John Cecil, 7th Earl of Exeter (c. 1700–1722)
