= St Augustine's Priory, Ealing =

School in Ealing, London, England

Coordinates: 51.5238°N 0.2927°W

St Augustine's Priory School

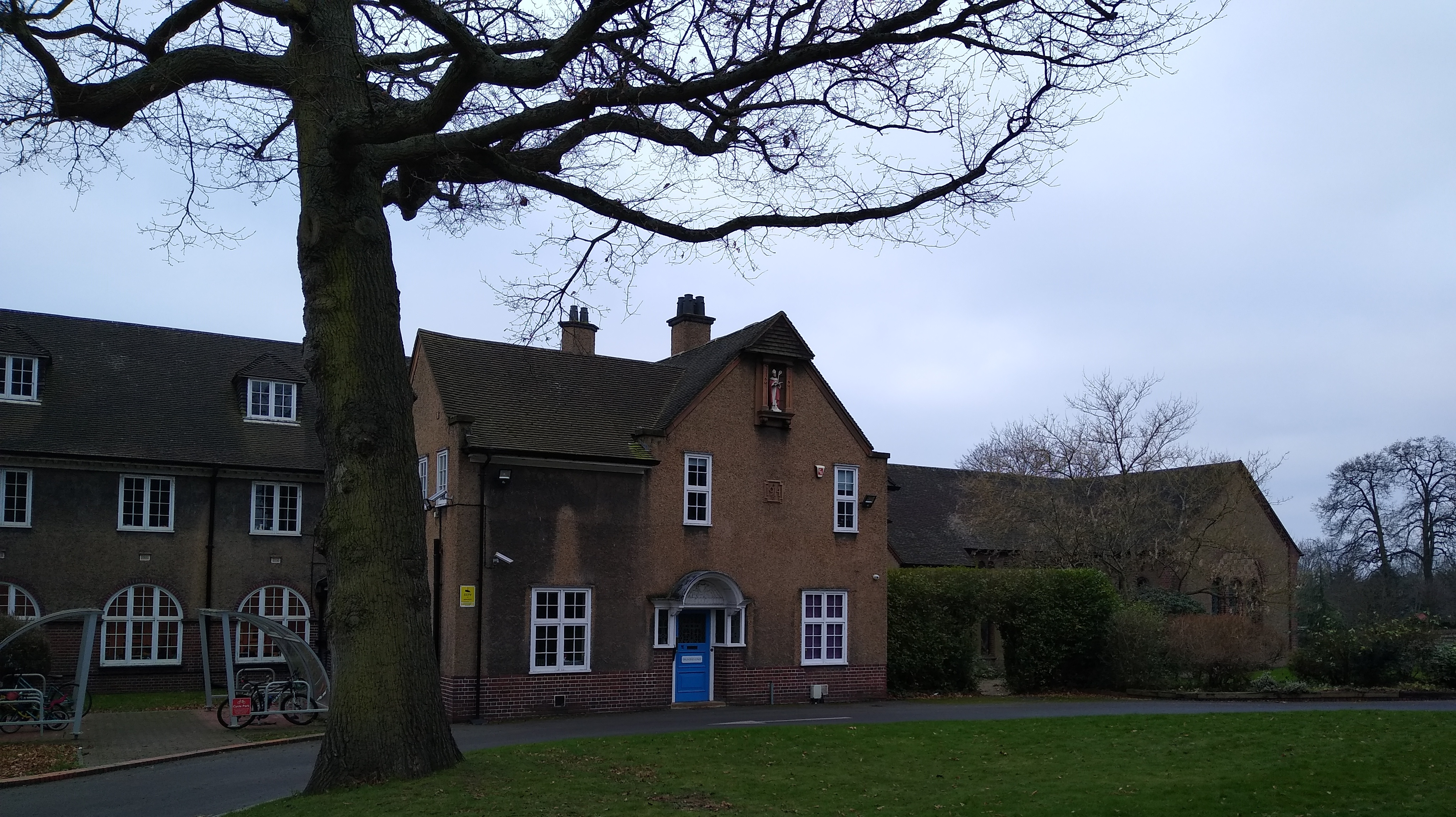

Location
- Hillcrest Road; London, W5 2JL; England

Information
- Type: Private day school
- Motto: Veritas (Truth)
- Religious affiliation: Roman Catholic
- Established: 1634; 392 years ago
- Local authority: Ealing
- Department for Education URN: 101946 Tables
- Ofsted: Reports
- Headteacher: Mrs C Macallister
- Gender: Girls; Coeducational (Nursery)
- Age: 3 to 18
- Enrolment: ~500
- Houses: St Michael; St George; St Raphael; St Gabriel
- Colours: Blue & Turquoise
- Former pupils: Old Augustinians
- Website: http://www.sapriory.com

St. Augustine's Priory
- Interactive map of St. Augustine's Priory

Monastery information
- Full name: Priory of St. Augustine
- Other names: Monastery of Notre-Dame-de-Sion, Paris
- Order: Canonesses Regular of the Lateran
- Established: 1631
- Disestablished: 1996
- Dedication: St. Augustine of Hippo
- Diocese: Westminster

People
- Founders: Abbess Lettice Mary Tredway, C.R.L.

St Augustine's Priory School, is an independent Catholic girls' school with boys in the Nursery in the London Borough of Ealing, England. It caters from Nursery children to Sixth Form. It was founded and staffed by nuns from the priory, though the school has been run by a lay head since 1996. The school consists of Nursery (2-4) Prep (4–7 years), Junior (7-11) and Senior (11-18) departments and welcomes girls of all faiths.

== History ==
Lettice Mary Tredway, CRL, was a member of a French community of Canonesses Regular of the Lateran at the Priory of Notre-Dame-de-Beaulieu in the village of Sin-le-Noble, near Douai, in the County of Flanders, which provided nursing care to the region. She was authorized by the religious authorities, including Bishop Richard Smith, Vicar Apostolic for Great Britain, to found an English-speaking community of her Order. She founded the monastery, called Notre-Dame-de-Sion, in 1631 in Paris.

Shifting from medical care, the school was opened by the community in 1634 for English pupils escaping the persecution of Catholics in their homeland. The priory remained in operation there until the canonesses were forced to flee France at the outbreak of the French Revolution, at which point they returned to England. Finding refuge in their native country, they re-established their religious community and the school under its current name.

The priory moved to Ealing in 1910, to Castlebar Road, and in 1915 moved to its present site in Hillcrest Road. During the campaign for women's suffrage, one of the school leaders (Headmistress and Latin tutor), Mother Mary Frances, supported this cause by chaining herself to railings and breaking windows.

The Second World War was a difficult time as London was bombed during the Blitz but the school continued operating. Whenever the air raid sirens sounded, canonesses would take the girls down to the cellars and continue lessons.

Although a priory by name, it now consists solely of the school, run by lay staff members, as the canonesses voted in a final meeting in 1996 of the chapter of the priory to dissolve, due to their reduced numbers and the advanced age of its members. They dispersed to join other communities of the Order. The school maintains its Catholic ethos through its pastoral care and has close links with the local archdiocese and the nearby Benedictine Ealing Abbey which hosts the school's annual Carol Concert in December.

== Grounds ==
The school is set in 13 acres (5.3 ha) of grounds, adjacent to Hanger Lane, consisting of a wild flower meadow, orchard, Prep meadow, two netball courts, a rose garden, a working farm, croquet lawn, a sweeping playing field and an all-weather floodlit AstroTurf.

== Notable former pupils ==
- Hannah Kendall (born 1984) — composer
- Rena Lalgie — civil servant, Governor of Bermuda
- Molly Manning Walker (born 1993) – filmmaker
- Phoebe Waller-Bridge (born 1985) — actress, writer, playwright and director of stage and television
