= Ferdinando d'Adda =

His Eminence Ferdinando d'Adda
- Cardinal-Bishop of Albano
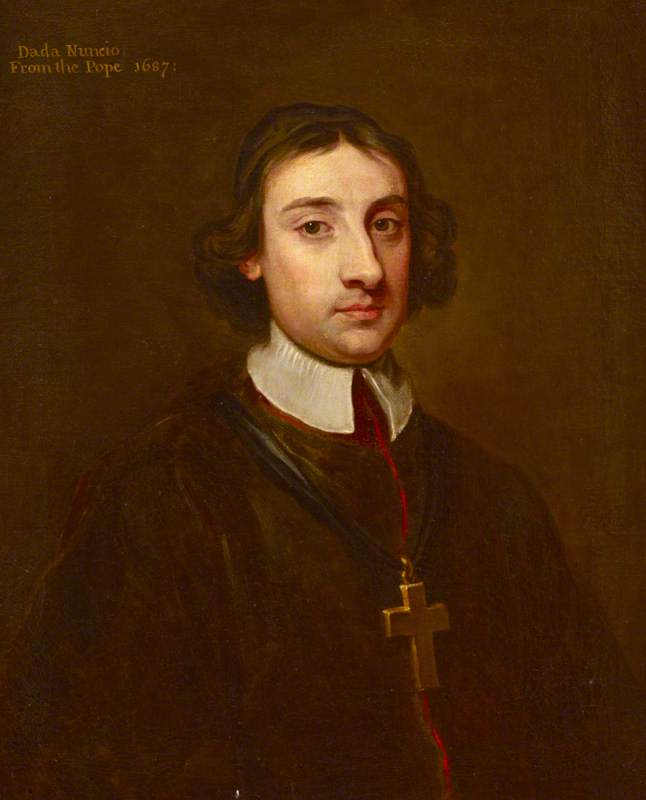
- Ferdinando d'Adda, in a portrait by Sir Godfrey Kneller
- Church: Catholic Church

Orders
- Consecration: 1 May 1687 by Dominic Maguire
- Created cardinal: 6 May 1690 by Alexander VIII

Personal details
- Born: 27 August 1649 Milan, Duchy of Milan
- Died: 27 January 1719 (age 68) Rome, Papal States
- Buried: San Carlo ai Catinari

Ferdinando d'Adda (27 August 1649 – 27 January 1719) was a Catholic Cardinal, bishop and diplomat. As a member of the family of the counts of Adda, he was a kinsman of Pope Innocent XI, who conferred upon him the titular abbacy of a famous abbey.

== Biography ==
Ferdinando d'Adda was born to an ancient patrician family in Milan. He was educated at Bologna and Pavia. He served as Prefect of the Congregation of Rites. Having performed a purely formal duty in Madrid in 1681, Adda was sent by Innocent XI as Papal Nuncio in London during the reign of James II in November 1685, the Catholic Encyclopedia reports that he was charged with the delicate task of inducing the English King to intercede with Louis XIV (then quite inimical to the Holy See) in favour of the oppressed Protestants of France.

He was made titular Archbishop of Amasia, and was consecrated in the Royal Chapel of St James's Palace, in a full Roman Catholic ceremony on 1 May 1687 by Dominic Maguire, Archbishop of Armagh, with John Leyburn, Titular Bishop of Adramyttium, and John O'Molony, Bishop of Killaloe, serving as co-consecrators. The King's decision at the ceremony to prostrate himself before d'Adda horrified his Protestant courtiers, who were in no way reassured by his explanation that he was kneeling to d'Adda as Archbishop, not as nuncio.

During his residence in England, he was often quite critical of the King's policies: he was one of the few Catholic observers who understood that the Trial of the Seven Bishops for seditious libel, (in that they had refused to republish the King's Declaration of Indulgence) would be a serious political mistake. He remarked "This matter seems very serious, and perhaps the most critical that has yet arisen in this reign. It could yet have more implications than are yet apparent."

D'Adda was made Cardinal-Priest of San Clemente by Pope Alexander VIII in 1690. In 1715, d'Adda was made Cardinal Bishop of Albano, and began a thorough restoration of Albano Cathedral, where his memorial records his works.

He died in Rome in 1719 and is buried in the church of San Carlo ai Catinari.

== Works ==
- Dal Pozzo, Francesco (1679). Trattato intorno al gouerno del magnif. Collegio sopra la custodia dell'Adige. Con raccolta vniuersale de decreti dell'eccellentiss. Senato, Ordini, e Capitoli in tal materia stabiliti in diuersi tempi dal Consiglio di 12. e 50. della magnifica citta di Verona, & di detto officio. Ridotto in capi da Francesco dal Pozzo dottor collegiato ... In Verona: per Gio. Battista Merlo stamp. cam.

Catholic Church titles
Preceded by	Apostolic Nuncio to Great Britain; 1687–1690	Succeeded by
Preceded by Francesco de' Marini	Titular Archbishop of Amasea; 1687–1690	Succeeded by Agostino Cusani
Preceded by Innico Caracciolo (seniore)	Cardinal-Priest of San Clemente; 1690–1696	Succeeded by Tommaso Maria Ferrari
Preceded by José Sáenz de Aguirre	Cardinal-Priest of Santa Balbina; 1696–1714	Succeeded by Antonfelice Zondadari
Preceded by Fulvio Astalli	Cardinal-Priest of San Pietro in Vincoli; 1714–1715	Succeeded by Lorenzo Casoni
Preceded by César d'Estrées	Cardinal-Bishop of Albano; 1715–1719	Succeeded by Fabrizio Paolucci
