= George Musket =

George Musket, alias Fisher (1583 – 24 December 1645) was an English Roman Catholic priest and controversialist. On the English mission he was under sentence of death for around 20 years, but survived.

== Life ==
The son of Thomas Fisher and Magdalene Ashton, he was born in 1583 at Barton, Northamptonshire. He was educated for three years partly at Barton and partly at Stilton, and subsequently for about half a year in Wisbech Castle, where he was a volunteer attendant on the incarcerated Catholic priests. In 1597 he became a Catholic convert. Two of his brothers were also converted about the same time: Richard, who ultimately joined the Society of Jesus, and Thomas, who became a secular priest.

George proceeded to the English College of Douay and was formally reconciled to the Roman Catholic Church. He continued his studies there for four years, and was then sent to the English College at Rome, where he was admitted on 21 October 1601. He took the college oath on 3 November 1602, was ordained priest on 11 March 1606, and was sent to England in May 1607, but he was detained at Douay, where he was engaged for upwards of a year in teaching theology.

On 9 September 1608 he left Douay for the English mission. He resided for the most part in London. He was dexterous in managing conferences between representatives of his own co-religionists and Protestants. On 21 and 22 April 1621, he and John Percy the Jesuit held a disputation with Daniel Featley and Thomas Goad. In the reign of Charles I he was in confinement for many years. On 6 January 1627 the secretaries of state Edward Conway, 1st Viscount Conway and John Coke issued a warrant for the apprehension of him and of Richard Smith, bishop of Chalcedon. A memorandum of the period states that Musket had several years before broken out of Wisbech Castle, had since been banished, and, having returned, had again been taken prisoner.

On 6 October 1628 he was in confinement at the Gatehouse Prison. Subsequently he was brought to trial, and, as one of the witnesses swore positively to his saying mass, he was condemned to death. He remained for twenty years under sentence, but operated as before. On the intercession of Queen Henrietta Maria he was reprieved and afterwards pardoned, but only on the condition of his remaining in confinement during the King's pleasure.

When a proposal was made in 1635 for the appointment of a Catholic bishop for England, Musket's name was in the list of persons proposed to the Holy See. He was still a prisoner when he was chosen president of the English College of Douay in succession to Matthew Kellison, who died on 21 January 1641; but through the Queen's intercession he was released and banished. He arrived at Douay on 14 November 1641. Though he governed the college in hard times, he brought down its debt. He died on 24 December 1645, and was succeeded in the presidency by William Hyde.

== Works ==
He is believed to be the author of an anonymous polemical book and impersonation on the death of John King.
