= Miles Pinkney =

English Roman Catholic priest

Miles Pinkney (1599–1674), alias Thomas Carre or Carr, was an English Roman Catholic priest of the Old Chapter. A point of contact for English Catholics with Cardinal Richelieu, some of whose works he translated, he was also a founder of the St Augustin convent in Paris.

== Life ==
He was brought up at Broom Hall (now known as Broomhall farm), Ushaw Moor, in the bishopric of Durham. He was sent to the English College at Douai, was admitted among the clergy per tonsuram 13 June 1620, and was ordained priest by special dispensation 15 June 1625.

Afterward, he was appointed procurator of the college, and he held that office till 1634, when he undertook the project of founding a monastery of canonesses of St Augustin at Paris, where he resided as their confessor until his death. The foundation of this monastery preoccupied him through much of his life. After a seizure with a palsy he became almost paralysed for nearly twelve years before his death, which occurred in the monastery, then situated in the Rue des Fossés Saint Victor, Paris, on 31 October 1674.

He was a great friend of Richard Crashaw the poet, and saw his Carmen Deo Nostro through the press. Arras College in Paris was in 1667 much expanded by him, though it was not completed till many years later, when Dr. John Betham was appointed to preside over it. Carre was respected by the court of France, especially by Cardinal Richelieu, who was a munificent benefactor to the English Catholics abroad through his mediation.

== Works ==
His works are:

- A Treatise of the Love of God, 2 vols., Paris, 1630, translated from the French of St. Francis of Sales.
- The Spiritual Conflict, 1632, translated from the French of Bishop Camus.
- The Draught of Eternity, 1632, a translation from the French of Bishop Camus.
- The Principall Points of the Faith of the Catholike Chvrch. Defended against a writing sent to the King by the 4 Ministers of Charenton. By the most eminent Armand Ihon de Plessia, Cardinal Dvke de Richeliev. Englished by M.C., confessor to the English Nuns at Paris, 1635.
- Of the Following of Christ, written in Latin by Thomas à Kempis, Paris, 1636.
- Occasional Discourses, Paris, 1646.
- Thomas of Kempis, Canon Regvlar of S. Avgvstine's Order, his Sermons of the Incarnation and Passion of Christ. Translated out of Latine, Paris, 1653.
- Thomas of Kempis, his Soliloquies translated ovt of Latine, Paris, 1653.
- A Christian Instrvction composed longe a goe, by that most eminent Cardinall Armand Ihon de Plessis, Cardinall of Richeliev, newly translated, 3rd ed., Paris, 1662.
- Meditations and Prayers on the Life, Passion, Resvrrection, and Ascension of our Saviovr Iesus-Christ. Written in Latine by Thomas of Kempis, Paris, 1664.
- A Proper Looking Glasse for the Daughters of Sion or S. Augustine's Life Abridged, and reduced into points of Meditation. With Meditations for a spirituall exercise at Clothings and Profeßions. By Thomas Carre their confessour, Paris, 1665.
- Sweete Thoughtes of Jesvs and Marie, or Meditations for all the Sundays and Feasts of our B. Saviour and B. Virgin Mary; for the use of the daughters of Sion, 2 parts, 1655.
- Pietas Parisiensis, or a short description of the Pietie and Charitie commonly exercised in Paris. Which represents in short the pious practises of the whole Catholike Church, Paris, 1666. An abridgment of this work was published by Abraham Woodhead in Pietas Romana et Parisiensis, Oxford, 1687, and that work elicited Some Reflections, with a Vindication of Protestant Charity by James Harrington, Oxford, 1688.
- The Funerall Sermon of the Queen of Great Britanie, Paris, 1670.
