= Apostolic Prefecture of the United States =

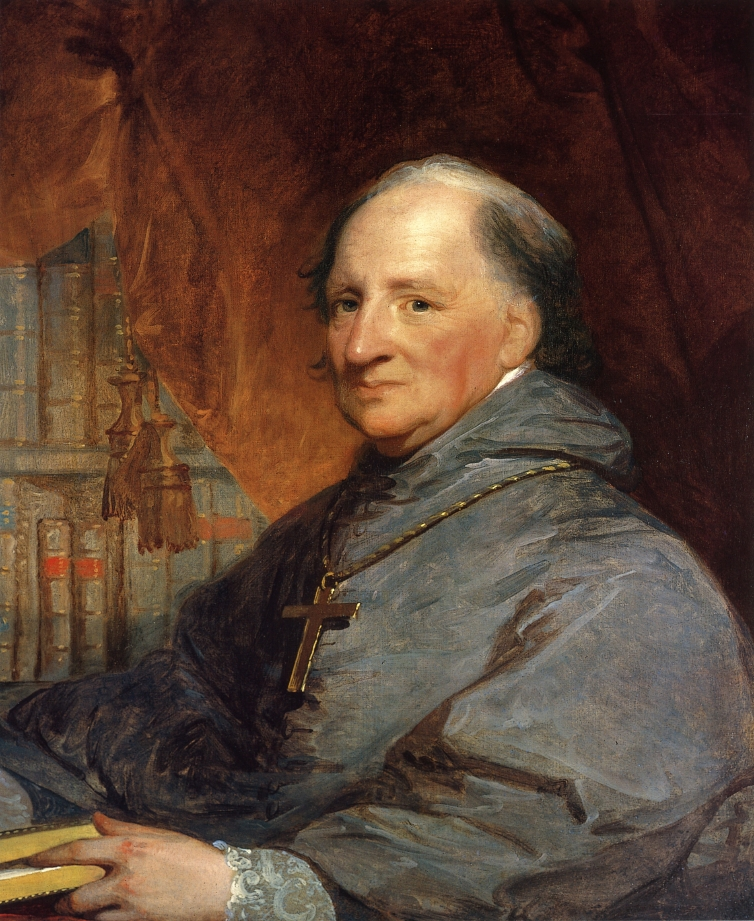
Gilbert Stuart's portrait of John Carroll, first leader of the Apostolic Prefecture of the United States.

The Apostolic Prefecture of the United States (Latin: Praefectura Apostolica Civitatum Foederatarum Americae Septentrionalis) was the earliest Roman Catholic ecclesiastical jurisdiction to be officially recognized within the United States after its declaration of independence in 1776.

== Previous British jurisdiction and American independence ==
Before and during the American Revolutionary War, the Catholics in the Thirteen Colonies (not including French Canada) were under the ecclesiastical jurisdiction of the bishop of the Apostolic Vicariate of the London District in England.

The war was formally ended by the Treaty of Paris, which was signed on September 3, 1783, and was ratified by the Congress of the Confederation (of the newly independent United States of America) on January 14, 1784, and by King George III of Great Britain on April 9, 1784. The ratification documents were exchanged in Paris on May 12, 1784. A petition was sent by the Maryland clergy to the Holy See, on November 6, 1783, for permission for the missionaries in the United States to nominate a superior who would have some of the powers of a bishop.

== Nomination of John Carroll ==
In response to that, Father John Carroll—having been elected by his brother priests—was confirmed by Pope Pius VI, on June 6, 1784, as Superior of the Missions in the thirteen United States of North America, with power to give the sacrament of confirmation. This act established a hierarchy in the United States and removed the Catholic Church in the United States from the authority of the Vicar Apostolic of the London District.

== Approval by the Holy See ==
The Holy See then established the Apostolic Prefecture of the United States on November 26, 1784. Five years later, the prefecture was elevated to a diocese: the Diocese of Baltimore.

== See also ==
- Roman Catholic Archdiocese of Baltimore
- Apostolic Nunciature to the United States
- Holy See–United States relations
