= Apostolic Vicariate of the London District =

Former Catholic ecclesiastical jurisdiction in England & Wales (1688-1850)

The Apostolic Vicariate of the London District

Location
- Country: England, British America, British North America
- Territory: Until 1850: Berkshire, Essex, Hampshire, Hertfordshire, Kent, Middlesex, Surrey and Sussex, together with the Isle of Wight and the Channel Isles; Until 1840: Bedfordshire and Buckinghamshire; Until November 1784: Thirteen Colonies; Until May 1784: Newfoundland

Information
- Denomination: Catholic Church
- Rite: Latin Church
- Established: 30 January 1688
- Dissolved: 29 September 1850

The Apostolic Vicariate of the London District was an ecclesiastical jurisdiction of the Catholic Church in England and Wales. It was led by a vicar apostolic who was a titular bishop. The apostolic vicariate was created in 1688 and was dissolved in 1850, when its former area was replaced by the episcopal sees of Westminster and Southwark.

== Background ==
Soon after the accession of Queen Elizabeth I, in 1559, the bishops of England and Wales were forced to choose between taking the Oath of Supremacy and thus denying the authority of the Pope or losing their episcopal sees. Those who chose to continue their allegiance to Rome were subsequently deposed and replaced in their sees by priests of the Church of England. Most of the deposed Bishops were imprisoned in various locations and died in captivity over a period of years though some left the country and continued their work overseas. The last of the deposed bishops was Thomas Goldwell, Bishop of St Asaph, who died in Rome on April 3, 1585.

== Apostolic Vicariate of England ==
In 1623, after 65 years of formal absence from England and Wales, Pope Urban VIII appointed a bishop with actual jurisdiction in England. His choice fell upon William Bishop, who was given the title of Apostolic Vicar of England. Bishop landed secretly in England at midnight on 31 July 1623, but was to die only nine months later.

Bishop was succeeded in office by Richard Smith, also ordained a bishop, who arrived in England in April 1625. However, two warrants were issued for Smith's arrest in August 1631, and he was forced to resign and flee to France, where he eventually died in Paris in 1655. After 1631, there was no Roman Catholic bishop in England for another 54 years, and the void was to some extent filled by a dean and chapter of rather unsure legal status, first established by Bishop and confirmed by Smith.

It was only in 1685 that a successor was appointed by Rome, in the person of John Leyburn, a Doctor of Divinity of the Sorbonne and a former President of the English College at Douai, who was consecrated bishop in Rome on 9 September 1685. In 1623, Bishop had divided England into six areas, at the head of each of which he placed a superior with the title of vicar general, and this had remained the system thereafter. Leyburn reduced these six areas to four. In the summer of 1687 he toured the North of England and confirmed over 20,000 Catholics there.

== Apostolic Vicariate of the London District ==
On 30 January 1688, the number of bishops in England and Wales was increased by the Pope to four vicars apostolic, as a result of which the single apostolic vicariate was divided into the London District, the Midland District, the Northern District and the Western District. The first vicar apostolic of the London District was Bishop John Leyburn, who had previously since 24 August 1685 served as Vicar Apostolic of England. In 1688, the Apostolic Vicariate of London also became responsible for Catholics in the British colonies of the New World. This ended in Newfoundland on 30 May 1784 with the creation of the Apostolic Prefecture of Newfoundland, and in the United States on 26 November 1784 with the creation of the Apostolic Prefecture of the United States. Although the vicariates as a whole were later more finely divided over the years, and notwithstanding intermittent persecution, an Apostolic Vicariate of the London District continued in existence until 29 September 1850, when Pope Pius IX issued the bull Universalis Ecclesiae by which thirteen new dioceses were created, among them the metropolitan Diocese of Westminster, a new jurisdiction which formally replaced part of the previous vicariate. At the same time, the remainder of the London District became the suffragan Diocese of Southwark.

The last Apostolic Vicar of the London District was Bishop Nicholas Wiseman (d. 1865), who on 29 September 1850 was assigned the title of Metropolitan Archbishop of Westminster. The following day he was created a cardinal. The district ceased to be missionary territory and exempt, its prelate becoming the head of the new English ecclesiastical province.

== List of Apostolic Vicars of the London District ==
Vicars Apostolic of the London District
From	Until	Incumbent	Notes
1688	1702	John Leyburn, Titular Bishop of Hadrumetum	Hitherto Apostolic Vicar of England 1685–1688. Appointed apostolic vicar on 30 January 1688. Died in office on 9 June 1702.
1703	1734	Bonaventure Giffard, Titular Bishop of Madaurus	Previously Apostolic Vicar of the Midland District 1687–1703. Appointed apostolic vicar on 14 March 1703. Died in office on 12 March 1734.
1734	1758	Benjamin Petre, O.S.B., Titular Bishop of Prusa	Appointed coadjutor vicar apostolic on 23 June 1721 and consecrated titular bishop on 11 November 1721. Succeeded vicar apostolic on 12 March 1734. Died in office on 22 December 1758.
1758	1781	Richard Challoner, Titular Bishop of Doberus	Appointed coadjutor apostolic vicar on 12 September 1739 and consecrated titular bishop on 29 January 1741. Succeeded apostolic vicar on 22 September 1758. Died in office on 12 January 1781.
1781	1790	James Robert Talbot, Titular Bishop of Birtha	Appointed coadjutor apostolic vicar on 10 March 1759 and consecrated titular bishop on 24 August 1759. Succeeded apostolic vicar on 12 January 1781. Died in office on 26 January 1790.
1790	1812	John Douglass, Titular Bishop of Centuria	Appointed apostolic vicar on 10 September 1790 and consecrated titular bishop on 19 December 1790. Died in office on 8 May 1812.
1812	1827	William Poynter, Titular Bishop of Alia	Appointed coadjutor vicar apostolic on 6 Mar 1803 and consecrated titular bishop on 29 May 1803. Succeeded apostolic vicar on 8 May 1812. Died in office on 26 November 1827.
1827	1836	James Yorke Bramston, Titular Bishop of Usula	Appointed coadjutor apostolic vicar on 4 February 1823 and consecrated titular bishop on 29 June 1823. Succeeded apostolic vicar on 26 November 1827. Died in office on 11 July 1836.
1836	1847	Thomas Griffiths, Titular Bishop of Olena	Appointed coadjutor apostolic vicar on 30 July 1833 and consecrated titular bishop on 28 October 1833. Succeeded apostolic vicar on 11 July 1836. Died in office on 12 August 1847.
1848	1849	Thomas Walsh, Titular Bishop of Cambysopolis	Previously Apostolic Vicar of the Central District 1840–1848. Appointed apostolic vicar on 17 July 1848. Died in office on 18 February 1849.
1849	1850	Nicholas Wiseman, Titular Bishop of Milopotamus	Appointed coadjutor apostolic vicar on 29 August 1847 and succeeded apostolic vicar on 18 February 1849. Became the first Archbishop of Westminster on 29 September 1850.
In 1850, the London District was dissolved and replaced by the episcopal sees of Westminster and Southwark.

== See also ==
- Religion in the United Kingdom
- Roman Catholicism in England and Wales
- Roman Catholicism in the United Kingdom
- Lists of office-holders
- Apostolic Prefecture of the United States
- Roman Catholic Archdiocese of Baltimore (United States)

== Bibliography ==
- Anstruther, Godfrey. The Seminary Priests. Vol. 1. Ware: St Edmund's College. pp. 321–322.
- Anstruther, Godfrey. The Seminary Priests. Vol. 2. Ware: St Edmund's College. pp. 193, 195–200.
- Brady, W. Maziere (1876c). The Episcopal Succession in England, Scotland and Ireland, A.D. 1400 to 1875. Vol. 3. Rome: Tipografia Della Pace.
- Hemphill, Basil (1953). The Early Vicars Apostolic of England 1685-1750. London: Burns & Oates.
- Schofield, Nicholas; Skinner, Gerard (2009). The English Vicars Apostolic. Oxford: Family Publications. ISBN 978-1-907380-01-3.
