= John Betham =

English Catholic priest and tutor

John Betham (1642?–1709) was an English Catholic priest and tutor to James Francis Edward Stuart (son of James II of England and later called the Old Pretender).

== Life ==
He was a native of Warwickshire, where his elder brother owned an estate. He completed his studies at Douai, and was ordained priest there. He went to Paris in 1667, resuming his studies, and after ten years was created a doctor of the Sorbonne. Then he came to England on the English Mission, but the excitement caused by Titus Oates's narrative of the Popish Plot meant he returned to France.

Betham then revived an old project for erecting a seminary for the benefit of such of the English clergy taking degrees in the university of Paris. Arras College at Paris had been founded as early as 1611 for the maintenance of learned writers in defence of Catholicism. In 1667, this institution was expanded by Thomas Carre (né Miles Pinkney); but the scheme was not completed until many years later, when Betham was appointed to preside over the seminary. He was appointed one of the chaplains and preachers in ordinary to King James II. A sermon he preached before the king and queen in the Chapel Royal, St James's Palace on the Feast of the Annunciation, 1686, was printed by royal order.

He remained in office until the Glorious Revolution, and soon afterwards he followed James to St Germain. He was appointed preceptor to the Chevalier de Saint George, and after King James's death that office was confirmed to him by commission, dated 30 October 1701. Betham was a sympathizer with Jansenism, and Mary of Modena objected to his views. Broad as Betham may have been in theology, his curriculum for the young Chevalier has been seen as narrow.

Betham was able to purchase a house and garden in the Rue des Postes, Faubourg Saint Marceau, and open St Gregory's seminary by letters patent from the king of France in 1701. Some years before his death he retired there, where he ended his days in 1709.
