= Anthony Champney =

English Roman Catholic priest and controversialist

Anthony Champney (c. 1569 in England – c. 1643 in England) was an English Roman Catholic priest and controversialist.

== Life ==
He studied at Reims (1590) and Rome (1593). As priest he was imprisoned at Wisbech Castle, and was active against the Jesuits, acting later for the Appellant Clergy in Rome (1602).

Afterwards he was appointed president of Arras College near Paris, becoming doctor of theology and Fellow of the Sorbonne. He was vice-president of Douai College, from 1619 to 1625, and from 1628 until he returned to England, where he died some time after 1643.

== Works ==
He published:

- An Answer to a Letter of a Jesuited Gentleman (1601);
- A Manual of Controversies (1614);
- A Treatise of the Vocation of Bishops (1616), a reply to the Consecration of Bishops in the Church of England (1613) of Francis Mason
- Mr. Pilkington his Parallela Disparalled (1620)
- An Answer to a Pamphlet (by D. Featley) titled 'The Fisher catched in his own Net'. (1623);
- Defence of the Appendix to the Antidote (before 1624)
- Legatum Fratribus suis Cleri Anglicani Sacerdotibus Testamento relictum (in Bishop Smith's Monita)

His "History of Queen Elizabeth" (Annales Elizabethae Reginae) is still in manuscript. Formerly, as stated by Joseph Gillow, Thompson Cooper, Thomas Francis Knox, etc., it was preserved in the archives of the Old Chapter; from 1879 it has been in the Westminster Diocesan Archives. There are also some other works in manuscript.
