= Thomas Bell (Catholic priest) =

English Roman Catholic priest and later an anti-Catholic writer

Thomas Bell (fl. 1573–1610) was an English Roman Catholic priest, and later an anti-Catholic writer.

== Life ==
He was born at Raskelf, near Thirsk, Yorkshire, in 1551, and is said to have been beneficed as a clergyman in Lancashire. Subsequently, he became a Roman Catholic, and was imprisoned at York, around 1573. In 1576 he went to Douay College, and in 1579, when twenty-eight, entered the English College, Rome as a student of philosophy. In 1581, by then a priest, he was in the English seminary at Rome, and in the following March (1582) was sent into England.

In 1586 he appears as the associate of Thomas Worthington and other priests in Yorkshire, Lancashire, Cheshire, and elsewhere. He was mentioned in 1592 as one ill-affected to the government, and he shared the fate of other seminary priests in being arrested. He was sent to London; but he recanted, and was sent back to Lancashire to help look for Jesuits. After this he went to Cambridge, where he began the publication of his controversial writings.

After leaving Catholicism he participated in the persecution of Catholics, advocating the use of the rack, leading night time searches of Catholic homes and made a list of Catholics who had previously given him money as well as Lancastrian houses where Catholicism was still practiced.

Bell dedicated his Christian Dialogue (1609) to members of the Yorkshire Puritan gentry, including Stephen Proctor, Timothy Whittingham, Timothy Hutton, and the exchequer official Vincent Skinner.

== Works ==
They include:

- Thomas Bels Motives: concerning Romish Faith and Religion, Cambridge, 1593; 2nd ed. 1605.
- A Treatise of Usurie, Cambridge, 1594.
- The Survey of Popery, London, 1596.
- Hunting of the Romish Fox, 1598. This is entered on the Stationers' Register, 8 April 1598, and Bell himself claims the authorship in his Counterblast. Another work with the same title had been published by William Turner in 1543 (Basle).
- The Anatomie of Popish Tyrannie, wherein is conteyned a Plain Declaration … of the Libels, Letters, Edictes, Pamphlets, and Bookes lately published by the Secular Priests, and English Hispanized Jesuites, London, 1603.
- The Golden Balance of Tryall, London, 1603, annexed to this is A Counterblast against the Vaine Blast of a Masked Companion, who termeth Himself E. O., but thought to be Robert Parsons, the Trayterous Jesuite.
- The Downefall of Poperie, proposed by way of challenge to all English Jesuites and … Papists, London, 1604 and 1605; reprinted and entitled The Fall of Papistrie in 1628. Robert Parsons, Richard Smith, and Francis Walsingham wrote answers to this work.
- The Woefull Crie of Rome, London, 1605.
- The Popes Funerall: containing an exact and pithy Reply to a pretended Answere of a .. Libell, called the "Forerunner of Bells Downfall". … Together with his Treatise called the Regiment of the Church, London, 1606.
- The Jesuites Ante-past: containing a Reply against a Pretended Aunswere to the Downefall of Poperie, London, 1608.
- The Tryall of the New Religion, London, 1608.
- A Christian Dialogue between Theophilus, a Deformed Catholike in Rome, and Remigius, a Reformed Catholike in the Church of England, 1609.
- The Catholique Triumph: conteyning a reply to the pretended answere of B. C. [i.e. Parsons] lately published against The Tryall of the New Religion, London, 1610.

In his Jesuites Ante-past he states that Queen Elizabeth granted him a pension of fifty pounds a year, which James I continued.
