= Diocese of Adramyttium =

The Roman Catholic Diocese of Adramyttium was established in the 13th century as a suffragan of Cyzicus, but was later made a suffragan of Ephesus. In 1222, an unnamed bishop was entrusted with a papal assignment.

== Titular see ==
The diocese of Adramyttium was nominally revived as a Latin titular bishopric.

It is vacant, having had the following incumbents, all of the lowest (episcopal) rank :

- Jean Heysterbach, Dominican Order (O.P.) (1436.02.10 – 1447)
- Wilhelm Mader, Norbertines (O. Praem.) (1447.03.29 – 1450)
- Martin Dieminger (1450.11.13 – 1460.07.18)
- Jodok Seitz, O. Praem. (1460 – 1471.01.23)
- Jakob Goffredi (1471.05.13 – 1473)
- Ulrich Geislinger, Friars Minor (O.F.M.) (1474.03.23 – 1493.02.16)
- Bishop-elect Johann Welmecher, O.F.M. (1481.06.18 – ?)
- Johann Kerer (1493.05.05 – 1507.03.24)
- Heinrich Negelin (1506.12.06 – 1520.10)
- Michael Dornvogel (1554.08.13 – 1589.12.06)
- Sebastian Breuning (1586.06.23 – 1618.02.14)
- Peter Wall (1618.05.28 – 1630.07.05)
- Sebastian Müller (1631.04.28 – 1644.10.20)
- Kaspar Zeiler (1645.01.30 – 1681.07.04)
- John Leyburn (1685.08.24 – 1702.06.20), Apostolic Vicar of the London District
- Dionisio Resino y Ormachea (1705.12.14 – 1711.09.12)
- José Platas (1732.10.01 – 1745.11.02)
- Pedro Ponce y Carrasco (1746.11.28 – 1762.12.20)
- Miguel Cilieza y Velasco (1765.04.22 – 1767.04.27)
- Rafael Lasala Locela, Augustinians (O.E.S.A.) (1767.12.14 – 1773.06.18)
- Simonas Mikalojus Giedraitis (Szymon Michal Józef Arnold Giedroyć) (1804.08.20 – 1838.07.17)
- Michael von Deinlein (1853.06.27 – 1856.07.13), Auxiliary Bishop of Bamberg (Germany) ([1853.04.17] 1853.06.27 – 1856.07.13), later Bishop of Augsburg ([1856.01.12] 1856.07.13 – 1858.06.17), finally Metropolitan Archbishop of Bamberg (Germany) ([1858.06.17] 1858.09.17 – 1875.01.04)
- James Gibbons (1868.03.03 – 1872.07.30), Apostolic Vicar of North Carolina (USA) (1868.03.03 – 1877.05.20), later Bishop of Richmond (USA) (1872.07.30 – 1877.05.29), later Titular Archbishop of Ionopolis (1877.05.29 – 1877.10.03), Coadjutor Archbishop of Baltimore (USA) (1877.05.29 – 1877.10.03), succeeding as Metropolitan Archbishop of Baltimore (1877.10.03 – 1921.03.24), and was created Cardinal-Priest of Santa Maria in Trastevere (1887.03.17 – 1921.03.24), becoming Protopriest of the Sacred College of Cardinals (1920.12.07 – 1921.03.24)
- Louis-Taurin Cahagne (1873.03.21 – 1899.09.01)
- Clemente Coltelli (郭德禮), O.F.M. (1900.02.15 – 1901.01.28)
- Gabriel-Joseph-Elie Breynat, Missionary Oblates of Mary Immaculate (O.M.I.) (1901.07.22 – 1939.12.11), Apostolic Vicar of Mackenzie (Canada) (1901.07.31 – 1943.04.06), later Titular Archbishop of Garella (1939.12.11 – 1954.03.10)
- Joseph-Marie Trocellier, O.M.I. (1940.06.26 – 1958.11.27)
- Nicola Agnozzi, Conventual Franciscans (O.F.M. Conv.) (1962.04.02 – 1966.02.01)

== See also ==
- Adramyttium
- Catholic Church in Turkey

== Bibliography ==
- Van Tricht, Filip (2011). The Latin Renovatio of Byzantium: The Empire of Constantinople (1204–1228). Leiden: Brill. ISBN 978-90-04-20323-5.
