= William Harrison (Archpriest of England) =

English Roman Catholic priest

The Reverend Father William Harrison, D.Th.
- Archpriest of England
- Church: Roman Catholic Church
- Appointed: 23 February 1615
- Term ended: 11 May 1621
- Predecessor: George Birkhead

Orders
- Ordination: before 23 April 1578

Personal details
- Born: circa 1553 Derbyshire, England
- Died: 11 May 1621 (aged c. 68)
- Denomination: Roman Catholic
- Education: English College, Douai; English College, Rome

William Harrison (c.1553–1621) was an English Roman Catholic priest. He was the third and last archpriest of England.

== Life ==
Born in Derbyshire circa 1553, he entered the English College, Douai in 1575. Ordained a deacon, he afterwards went to Rome. The records of the English College, Rome contain an entry to the effect that "Pater Gulielmus Harrison", then aged 25 years, and a priest studying Theology in the College, took the mission oath on 23 April 1578. He left the College for England on 26 March 1581, having previously, as usual on such occasions, had an audience with the Pope. From 1581 to 1587, he served the English mission, and in the last named year, went to Paris and became Licentiate in civil and canon law.

In 1590, he was entrusted by Father Robert Persons with the government of a small school for English in Eu, Normandy, and remained there until it was broken up by civil war, in 1593. Harrison then became the Procurator of the English College at Reims, took his degree of Doctor in Theology in 1597. Having returned to Douai when the college was restored there, he took his doctorate in divinity, in 1597, in that university, and was professor of theology at the English College until 1603.

He then went to Rome for five years, where he gained wide experience in ecclesiastical affairs. Harrison returned to Douai on 29 October 1608, and left it on 19 June 1609, when he set out on his way back to the mission in England.

Following the death of George Birkhead in 1614, Harrison was appointed archpriest of England by Pope Paul V on 23 February 1615. His brief was dated 11 July 1615. Besides the usual faculties, Pope Paul V granted to Harrison "Facultates pro archipresbytero Angliæ, in regnis Angliæ, Scotiæ, Hiberniæ, Monæ, et aliis locis dominii regis Magnæ Britanniæ, ac pro personis eorundum regnorum et dominiorum tantum" on 23 July 1615.

On 9 March 1617, Harrison issued a prohibition wherein secular priests under his jurisdiction were forbidden to attend plays by common players upon common stages, under penalty of losing their ecclesiastical faculties. In 1621 he sanctioned a protest sent to Rome by ten representatives of the secular regarding the institute established by Mary Ward as being opposed to the decrees of the Council of Trent.

His general policy was to restore peace between the secular clergy and the Jesuits while endeavouring to secure the independence of the former. To this end he aided Dr Matthew Kellison, president of the English College, Douai, in lessening the influence of the Jesuits there. He also aimed at restoring episcopal government in England. His influence ultimately secured this, though he himself died on 11 May 1621, just as his envoy was setting out for Rome.

== Bibliography ==
- Brady, W. Maziere (1876). The Episcopal Succession in England, Scotland and Ireland, A.D. 1400 to 1875. Vol. 3. Rome: Tipografia Della Pace.
- Tierney, M. A. (1843). Dodd's Church History of England. Vol. 5. London: Charles Dolman.

Catholic Church titles
Preceded by George Birkhead	Archpriest of England; 1615–1621	Succeeded by William Bishop as Vicar Apostolic of England
