= William Hyde (Douai) =

English Roman Catholic convert and priest

William Hyde (1597–1651) was an English Roman Catholic convert and priest, presumed to be of Dutch or Flemish background, who became President of the English College, Douai.

== Life ==
His real surname was Bayart or Beyard, and he was born in London on 27 March 1597. He entered Leyden University on 16 June 1610. He matriculated from Christ Church, Oxford, in October 1614, and graduated B.A. in December of the same year, having been allowed to count a semester when he studied logic at the University of Leyden. He proceeded M.A. in 1617.

In 1622 Bayart, known from that time as Hyde, became a Catholic, and entered the English College at Douai on 6 January 1623. He studied philosophy there under Harrington, and divinity, and was ordained priest in 1625. Succeeding his master Harrington, he remained for four more years in the college, as professor of philosophy. He returned to England, where he remained for a few years, holding the chaplaincy to John Preston of Furness Abbey in 1631, and the same office in the household of Henry Parker, 5th Baron Monteagle in 1632.

In 1633 he went back to Douai, and lectured on divinity; some of his letters written about this time are preserved. Driven from Douai by the plague about 1636, he became chaplain to the Blount family of Soddington, Worcestershire, where he remained for three years, holding during part of that time the Roman Catholic office of archdeacon of Worcester and Salop. He afterwards entered the family of Humphrey Weld, who during Hyde's chaplaincy in 1641 purchased Lulworth Castle, Dorset. In 1641 George Muscott, held as a prisoner in England, was appointed President of the college at Douai; Hyde agreed to fill his place, and arrived in Douay on 12 October 1641. Meanwhile, Muscott was unexpectedly set free and banished. He then assumed the presidency, and Hyde acted as vice-president, with a papal pension, until Muskett's death in 1645. He succeeded as President on 21 July 1646, and was created a D.D. in the year following.

As president Hyde cleared the college of a heavy load of debt, increased its library, and settled a controversy about the degrees of missioners. The Bishop of Arras made him censor librorum in 1648. He became canon of St. Amalus, and was appointed both regius professor of history and public orator in the University of Douai in 1649. In March 1651 Charles II of England paid the college a visit, and Hyde presented him with an address.

Hyde died on 22 December 1651, and was buried in Our Lady's chapel in the church of St. James at Douay. By his will he left the English College over nine thousand florins.

== Works ==
Two manuscripts of Hyde's remain:

- ‘A Resolution of Certain Cases.’
- ‘Abridgment of the Annals of Baronius.’
