= Old Chapter =

Ecclesiastical body in England

The Old Chapter was the body in effective control of the Roman Catholic Church in England from 1623 until an episcopal hierarchy was restored in 1850.

== Origin ==
The origin of the body known as the Old Chapter, dates from 1623, when after a period of more than half a century during which there was no episcopal government in England, William Bishop was at length created vicar apostolic. He survived less than a year, but during this period he organized a form of Catholic ecclesiastical government, by means of archdeacons and rural deans, throughout the country. It continued in force with little change down to the re-establishment of the hierarchy.

An integral part of his scheme was the creation of a chapter consisting of twenty-four canons with John Colleton as dean. The ecclesiastical status of the chapter has been disputed. A chapter without a diocese is an anomaly, unknown in canon law, and Rome always refrained from any positive act of recognition. On the other hand, she equally refrained from any censure, although it was known that the chapter was claiming and exercising large functions. They therefore argued that the chapter existed sciente et tacente sede apostolica (with the knowledge and silent consent of the pope) and that this was sufficient to give it a canonical status. When Bishop died they sent a list of names from which his successor might be chosen, and the Holy See accepted their action choosing the first name, Richard Smith. Three years later he had to leave the country, and spent the rest of his life in Paris. After his death the chapter assumed the right to rule the country in the vacancy of the episcopal office, and for thirty years all faculties were issued by the dean who claimed the verbal approval of Pope Alexander VII.

John Leyburn, Smith's former secretary, became the secretary for the Old Chapter.

== Later history ==
When James II of England ascended the throne, and England was divided into four districts or vicariates, the position of the chapter became still more anomalous. Leyburn, the first vicar Apostolic of that reign, was required to take an oath not to recognize the chapter, and a decree was issued in general terms suspending all jurisdiction of chapters of regulars and seculars so long as there were vicars Apostolic in England. According to Bernard Ward, "The Chapter had, it appears, offended Rome by constantly refusing to receive a Vicar Apostolic and demanding an Ordinary." In practice, they submitted, and ceased to exercise any acts of jurisdiction; but they continued their existence. The vicars Apostolic themselves were usually members.

When the hierarchy was reestablished in 1850, a chapter was erected in each diocese, and whatever claims to jurisdiction the Old Chapter had, from that time ceased. Not wishing to dissolve, however, they reconstituted themselves as the "Old Brotherhood of the English Secular Clergy", the dean of the chapter becoming president of the brotherhood.
