= Silvester Jenks =

English Catholic priest and theologian

Silvester Jenks (c. 1656 – December 1714) was an English Catholic priest and theologian.

== Biography ==
Born in Shropshire, Jenks attended the English College, Douai, where he served as Professor of Philosophy from 1680 to 1686. He later served as a preacher to James II. After the Glorious Revolution in 1688, he fled to Flanders. Upon his return to England, he laboured as a missionary in or near London and was appointed Archdeacon of Surrey and Kent. In 1711, he was elected Vicar Apostolic of the Northern District. Bishops Giffard and Witham wrote Rome to say that Jenks had been ill, and that it would be better to defer his consecration until after parliament had been dissolved to avoid any disturbance. Jenks died before being consecrated, probably in mid-December 1714.

== Works ==
Among Jenks's works are:

- A Contrite and Humble Heart
- Practical Discourses on the Morality of the Gospel
- The Blind Obedience of a Humble Penitent the Best Cure for Scruples
- The Whole Duty of a Christian
- A Short Review of the Book of Jansenius

A portrait engraved by le Pouter in 1694 is prefixed to a Paris edition of A Contrite and Humble Heart.
