= Roger Cadwallador =

Welsh Roman Catholic priest and martyr

Blessed Roger Cadwallador
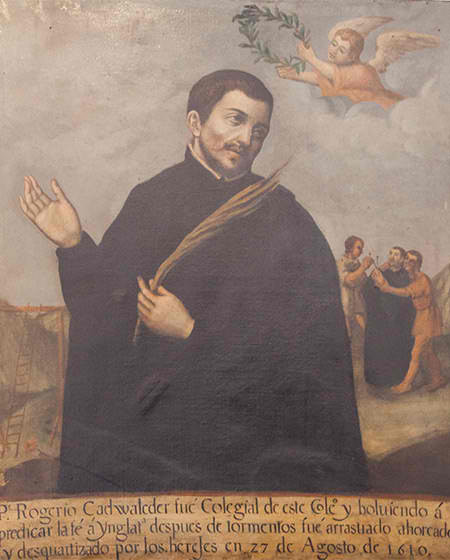

Priest and Martyr
- Born: c. 1568; Stretton Sugwas, Hereford, England
- Died: 27 August 1610 (aged 41 - 42); Leominster, Herefordshire, England
- Honored in: Roman Catholicism
- Beatified: 22 November 1987 by Pope John Paul II
- Feast: 27 August, 22 November
- Attributes: martyr's palm

Roger Cadwallador (1568 – 27 August 1610) was a Roman Catholic priest. He is a Catholic martyr, beatified in 1987.

== Life ==
Roger Cadwallador was born to a Welsh family at Stretton Sugwas, near Hereford. He was ordained subdeacon at Reims, 21 September 1591, and deacon the following February. In August 1592, was sent to the English College at Valladolid, where he was ordained priest in 1593.

Returning to England in 1594, he worked in Herefordshire as a missionary in both Welsh and English, especially among the poor, for about 16 years. Search was made for him in June 1605, but it was not till Easter, 1610, that he was arrested at the house of Mrs. Winefride Scroope, widow, within eight miles of Hereford. He was then brought before the Bishop of Hereford, Robert Bennet, who committed him to Hereford gaol where he was loaded with irons night and day. On being transferred to Leominster gaol he was obliged to walk all the way in shackles, though a boy was permitted to go by his side and bear up by a string the weight of some iron links which were wired to the shackles.

He was condemned, merely for being a priest, some months before his execution, which took place at Leominster; a very full account is given by Richard Challoner. He is said to have hung for a long time, suffering great pain, owing to the unskilfulness of the hangman, and was eventually cut down and butchered alive.

John Pitts praises his knowledge of Greek, from which he translated Theodoret's Ecclesiastical History. It was published posthumously at St. Omer's.

== Veneration ==
Roger Cadwallador was beatified by Pope John Paul II in 1987. There is a chapel dedicated to Cadwallador in the Church of Saint Ethelbert in Leominster.

== See also ==
- Douai Martyrs
