= Arras College =

Arras College was a Catholic foundation in Paris, a house of higher studies associated with the University of Paris, set up in 1611. It was intended for English priests, and had a function as a House of Writers, or apologetical college. This aspect of the college was prompted by the 1609 foundation of Chelsea College in London, designed for the production of polemical Protestant literature.

The original Arras College had support from Thomas Sackville, third son of Thomas Sackville, 1st Earl of Dorset, and Philippe de Caverel, abbot of St. Vedast in Arras, enlisted by Augustine Bradshaw (John White), providing its name.

Among those setting up the college, near Porte St Victoire, were Richard Smith, who had gained papal approval for it, Anthony Champney, Matthew Kellison, and Richard Ireland. William Bishop joined them shortly, after release from prison in England. Henry Holden was there in 1623 after his ordination; a few years later George Leyburn resided there before going on the English mission.

The original foundation lasted until 1635. At a later point, in 1667, Miles Pinkney began to revive the project, and a second house of higher studies, St. Gregory's, lasted in Paris until 1785, having had the support of John Betham, the first superior, with Bonaventure Giffard and Edward Paston.
