= William Bishop (bishop) =

Roman Catholic Bishop

The Right Reverend William Bishop
- Vicar Apostolic of England
- Appointed: 15 March 1623
- Term ended: 13 April 1624
- Predecessor: Post established
- Successor: Richard Smith
- Other post: Titular Bishop of Chalcedon

Orders
- Ordination: 1581
- Consecration: 4 June 1623

Personal details
- Born: 1553 Brailes, England
- Died: 13 April 1624 (aged 70–71)
- Denomination: Roman Catholic

William Bishop (c. 1553 – 13 April 1624) was an English Catholic prelate who served as the first Catholic bishop in England after the Reformation, serving as Vicar Apostolic of England.

Catholicism had been banned in England in 1559. Bishop was appointed as vicar apostolic in 1623. As Catholicism was officially illegal in England at the time, he was given the Titular See of Chalcedon in Asia Minor. He arrived in England secretly on 31 July 1623 at age 70 and had to walk 12 miles to find refuge. He identified and selected 20 archdeacons to take charge over geographical districts. He is one of several recorded bishops named Bishop.

== Life ==
The son of John Bishop, who died in 1601 at the age of 92, he was born at Brailes in Warwickshire in or about 1554. He was sent to Gloucester Hall, Oxford aged 16 around 1570. After remaining there three or four years he settled his paternal estate, which was considerable, on his younger brother, and went over to the English College at Rheims, where he began his theological studies; he then spent time at Rome. He returned to Rheims, was ordained priest at Laon in May 1583, and was sent on the English mission.

Arrested on his landing, he was taken before secretary Francis Walsingham and was imprisoned in the Marshalsea with other priests. Towards the close of the year 1584 he was released, and went to Paris, where he studied for several years at the Sorbonne, and was made a licentiate of divinity. He returned to England on the mission, 15 May 1591; after about two years he returned to Paris to complete the degree of D.D., and then came back to England.

Bishop was drawn into the Archpriest Controversy between the secular and regular clergy. When a dispute arose between George Blackwell, the archpriest, and a number of his clergy, who appealed against him for maladministration and exceeding his commission, Bishop and John Charnock were sent to Rome by their brethren to remonstrate against him. On their arrival they were both taken into custody by order of Cardinal Henry Cajetan, the protector of the English nation, who had been informed that they were turbulent persons and the head of a factious party. They were confined in the English College, Rome under the inspection of Robert Parsons, a Jesuit. After a time they regained their liberty and returned to England.

English Catholics in the new King James's reign were faced by a novel oath of allegiance. In the subsequent troubles Bishop was committed to the Gatehouse Prison; he and twelve other priests had declared civil allegiance, published by them in the last year of Queen Elizabeth's reign. He was examined on 4 May 1611, when he said he was opposed to the Jesuits, but declined to take the oath of allegiance, as Blackwell and others had done, because he wished to uphold the credit of the secular priests at Rome, and to get the English College there out of the hands of the Jesuits. On being again set at liberty he went to Paris and joined the small community of controversial writers which had been formed in Arras College.

According to the Catholic view, the episcopal hierarchy in England had come to an end when Thomas Goldwell died. The Holy See had been frequently importuned to appoint a bishop for England. William Bishop became vicar-apostolic and bishop-elect of Chalcedon in February 1623. In the following month a papal bull was issued for his consecration, followed almost immediately by a brief, conferring on him episcopal jurisdiction over the Catholics of England and Scotland. Thus Bishop had ordinary jurisdiction over the Catholics of England and Scotland, but it was revocable at the pleasure of the pope; in the language of the Papal Curia he was vicar-apostolic with ordinary jurisdiction. Almost immediately, the Scots objected that given the history between the two countries, that Pope Alexander III had declared that no Englishman should have authority in Scotland, not Scotsman in England. Pope Gregory then ordered that the new bishop should abstain from supervision over Catholics in Scotland.

Bishop instituted a dean and a chapter as a standing council for his own assistance, with power, during the vacancy of the see, to exercise episcopal ordinary jurisdiction. The appointment of this chapter, in time known as the Old Chapter, was a controversial matter, dividing the secular priests from the regular clergy.

Bishop was consecrated at Paris on 4 June 1623. He landed at Dover around midnight on 31 July, and walked thirteen miles to the house of William Roper at St. Dunstan's Manor, outside Canterbury. Then he was guest of Lady Dormer, administering the sacrament of confirmation to the Catholics in and near London. He next joined her nephew, Viscount Montague in Sussex. Returning to London, he passed most of the winter in retirement, and used all precautions to conceal himself and to avoid irritating the government. Falling sick at the residence of Sir Basil Brook, at Bishop's-court near London, he died on 13 April 1624.

His post was filled by Father Richard Smith.

== Works ==
His works are:

- ‘Reformation of a Catholic deformed in answer to Wm. Perkins,’ 2. parts, 1604–7.
- ‘A Reproofe of M. Doct. Abbot's Defence of the Catholike Deformed by M. W. Perkins. Wherein his sundry abuses of Gods sacred word, and most manifold mangling, misaplying, and falsifying the auncient Fathers sentences, be so plainely discouered, euen to the eye of euery indifferent reader, that whosouer hath any due care of his owne saluation, can neuer hereafter giue him more credit, in matter of faith and religion,’ 2 parts, Lond. 1608.
- ‘Disproof of Dr. R. Abbots counter-proof against Dr. Bishops reproof of the defence of Mr. Perkins' reform. Cath.,’ Paris 1614, part i.
- ‘Defence of the King's honour and his title to the Kingdom of England.’
- Pieces concerning the archpriest's jurisdiction.
- Preface to John Pits's book, ‘De illustribus Angliæ Scriptoribus,’ Paris, 1619.
- ‘An Account of the Faction and Disturbances in the Castle of Wisbech, occasioned by Father Weston, a Jesuit,’ manuscript.

In the second part of Thomas Scott's ‘Vox Populi, or Newes from Spayne’ (1624), there is an illustration of Bishop presiding at a meeting of the ‘Iesuits and prists: as they vse to sitt at Counsell in England to further ye Catholicke Cause.’

== See also ==
- James I of England

== Sources ==
- Leys, M. D. R., Catholics in England 1559-1829: A social history (London : Camelot Press Ltd., 1961)
- Holmes, Peter, ‘Bishop, William (c.1554–1624)’, Oxford Dictionary of National Biography, Oxford University Press, 2004

Catholic Church titles
Preceded by William Harrison as Archpriest of England	Apostolic Vicar of England; 1623–1624	Succeeded by Richard Smith
