= The Clink =

Former prison in Southwark, London

Coordinates: 51°30′25.48″N 0°05′30.95″W

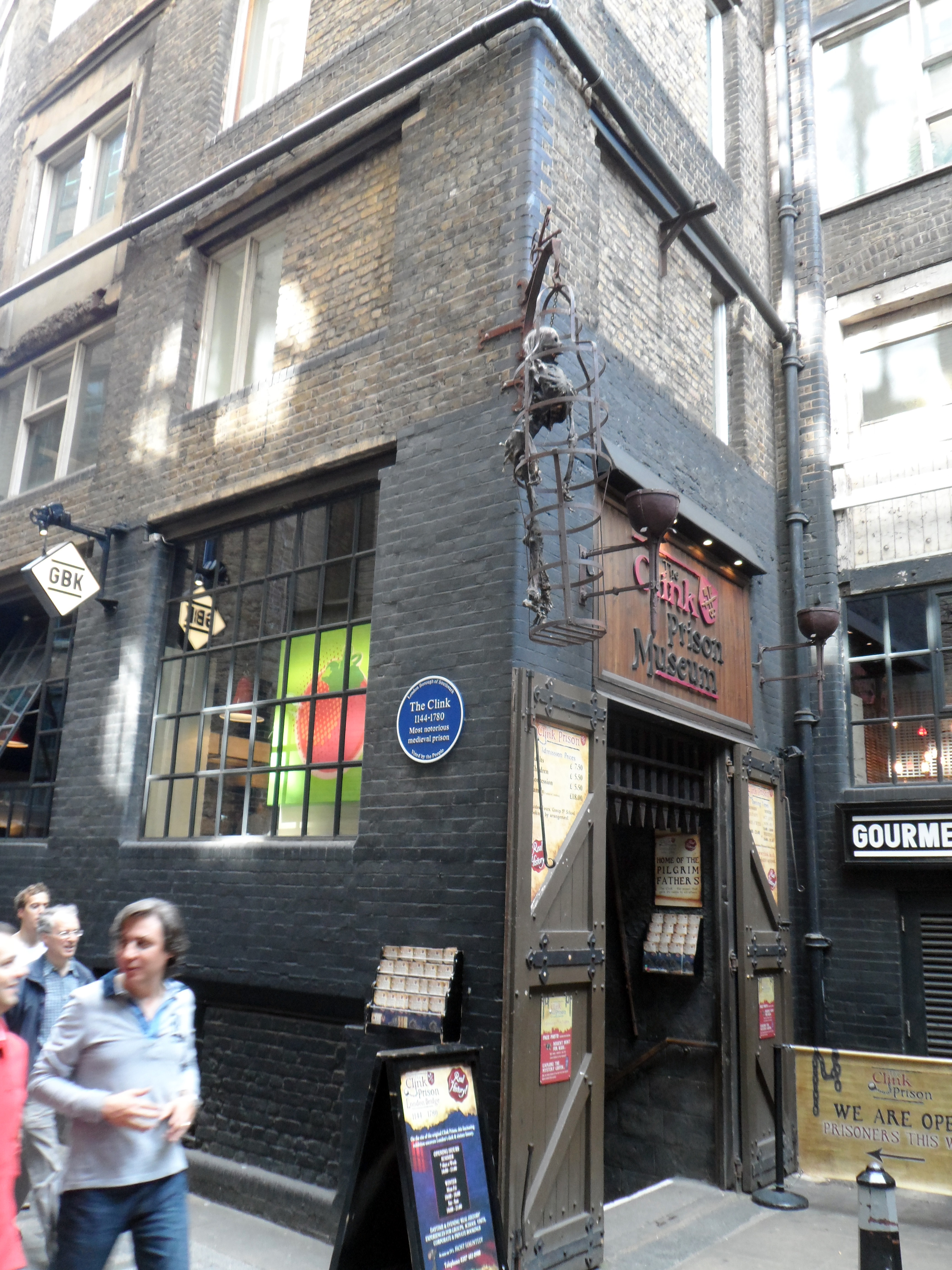
Entrance to The Clink prison museum, with a blue plaque commemorating the original prison

The Clink was a prison in Southwark, England, which operated from the 12th century until 1780. The prison served the Liberty of the Clink, a local manor area owned by the Bishop of Winchester rather than by the reigning monarch. As the Liberty owner, the Bishop kept all revenues from the Clink Liberty, and could put people in prison for failing to make their payments. As the Bishop, he could also imprison heretics. The Clink prison was situated next to the Bishop's London-area residence of Winchester Palace. The Clink was possibly the oldest men's prison and probably the oldest women's prison in England.

It is uncertain whether the name of the prison derived from, or was bestowed on, the Liberty that it served. The origins of the name "The Clink" are possibly onomatopoeic, deriving from the sound of striking metal as the prison doors were bolted, or the rattling of the chains the prisoners wore.

The name has become slang as a generic term for prison or a jail cell.

== History ==
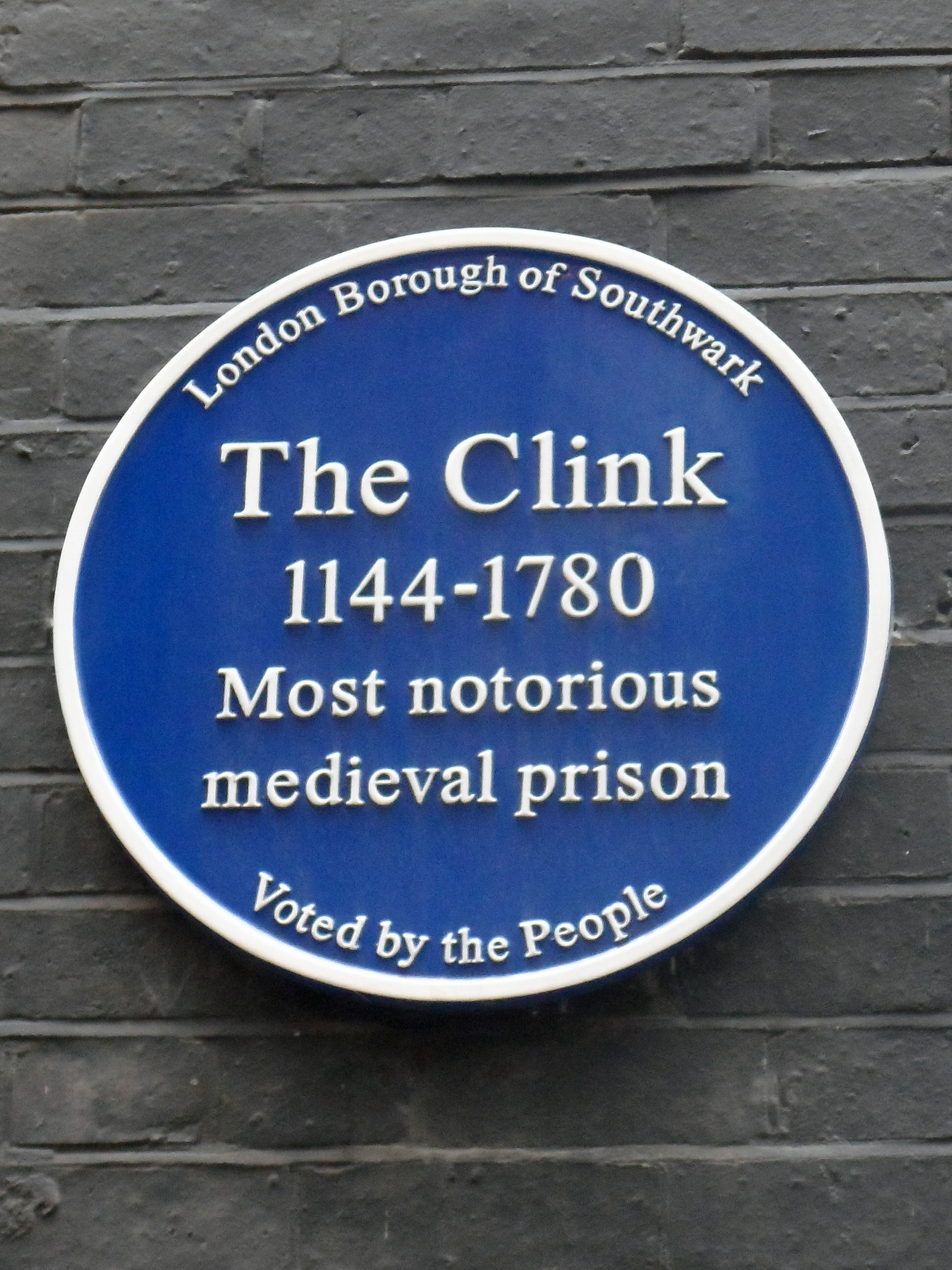
Blue plaque on the site

There had been a prison owned by the Bishop of Winchester in one form or another since the year 860, although at that time it would only have been one cell in a priests' college. By 1076 an archbishop had several types of punishment allowed: scourging with rods; solitary confinement; and bread and water in silence.

The Bishop of Winchester, whose diocese was located in Hampshire on the southern coast of England, ordered the construction of the Winchester Palace chapel and mansion at the Southwark site to serve as a residence close to his London governmental duties, sometime after the acquisition of the manor territory between 1144 and 1149.

The prison was made up of a number of structures within the mansion's area in which local miscreants were kept to await trial. That some of the prisoners were of higher status was solely because the Bishop of Winchester was a senior member of the king's government, usually Lord Chancellor. His ecclesiastical court could also put on trial those accused of heresy and other religious offences.

The gaolers were very poorly paid, so they found other ways to supplement their income. This meant that prisoners with money and friends on the outside were able to pay the gaolers to make their time better. The gaolers hired out rooms, beds, bedding, candles and fuel to those who could afford it. Food and drink were charged at twice the outside price. They accepted payments for fitting lighter irons and for removing them completely. For a fee, prisoners would be allowed outside to beg or even to work. Madams were allowed to keep a brothel going, with payments going to the gaolers. Poorer prisoners had to beg at the grates that led up to street level and sell anything they had with them, including their clothes, to pay for food.

Winchester House was raided by rioters protesting the Statute of Labourers in 1450. Classing clerics as tax collectors, they murdered them and released prisoners from the Clink before burning it down. The rebellion was put down and Winchester House was rebuilt and extended, including a new prison.

Originally, most of the prisoners had been those who had broken the rules of the Liberty, but by the 16th century, it had become largely a prison for actual or supposed heretics who held contrary views to the bishops. The Marian martyrs John Bradford and John Hooper were amongst the inmates. In later years it was mainly a debtors' prison.

=== Decline ===
In 1649 Winchester House was sold to a property developer and was divided into shops, tenements and dye houses. The Cage was removed temporarily as taxpayers had complained about the cost of upkeep, but the whipping post was still busy. By 1707 both of these and the stocks were all unused because of the cost of upkeep, and by 1732 there were only two registered inmates. In 1745 a temporary prison was used, as the Clink was too decayed to use, but by 1776 the prison was again taking in debtors. It was burnt down in 1780 by Gordon rioters, and was never rebuilt.

=== Today ===
The Clink Prison Museum exhibition is located on Clink Street, near to the original site, at Bankside, Southwark. The Clink Prison Museum tries to recreate the conditions of the original prison.

== Notable prisoners ==
=== English Catholics ===
- Father Laurence Vaux ~ 1581–1585 priest, catechism author
- William Alabaster ~ 1597, poet and playwright.
- Father John Gerard, S.J. ~1594–1597
- Father John Jones OFM ~1596–1598.
- Father George Blackwell ~1607–1613
- Matthew Wilson, alias Edward Knott, Jesuit author. 1629–1633

=== English Protestants ===
- John Lothropp
- Anne Askew

== See also ==
- List of prisons in the United Kingdom
- The Clink (restaurant)
