= John Pitts (Catholic scholar) =

English Roman Catholic scholar and writer

John Pitts (also Pits, Pitseus; 1560 – 17 October 1616) was an English Roman Catholic scholar and writer.

== Life ==
Pitts was born in Alton, Hampshire in 1560 and attended Winchester College. From 1578 to 1580 he studied at New College, Oxford. In 1581 he was admitted to the English College, Rome.

In 1588 he was ordained priest, and became professor at the English College, Reims. He then graduated Lic.D. at Trier (1592) and D.D. at Ingolstadt (1595). He became Canon at Verdun, then confessor and almoner to the Duchess of Cleves; after her death he became Dean of Liverdun. He died in Liverdun, Lorraine.

== Work ==
- Relationum Historicarum de rebus Angliæ in four parts:
  - De Illustribus Angliæ Scriptoribus, published in Paris in 1619
  - De Regibus Angliæ
  - De Episcopis Angliæ
  - De Viris Apostolicis Angliæ

(the last three parts remained in manuscript in Liverdun)

- Tractatus de legibus, published in Trier in 1592
- Tractatus de beatitudine, published in Ingolstadt in 1595
- Libri septem de peregrinatione published in Düsseldorf in 1604
