= George Birkhead =

English Roman Catholic priest

The Reverend Father George Birkhead
- Archpriest of England
- Church: Roman Catholic Church
- Appointed: 1 February 1608
- Term ended: 6 April 1614
- Predecessor: George Blackwell
- Successor: William Harrison

Orders
- Ordination: 6 April 1577

Personal details
- Born: circa 1549 County Durham, England
- Died: 6 April 1614 (aged c. 65)
- Denomination: Roman Catholic

George Birkhead or Birket, alias Hall, Lambton, and Salvin (c.1553–1614) was an English Roman Catholic priest who served as the archpriest of England from 1608 until his death in 1614.

== Life ==
He was a native of County Durham. He entered the English College, Douai in 1575, and was ordained priest on 6 April 1577. In January 1578 he set out from Reims, accompanied by Richard Haddock and four students, for the English College at Rome, which had just been founded by William Allen under the auspices of Pope Gregory XIII. He left Rome for Reims in September 1580, passing by way of Milan where he and his companions enjoyed the hospitality of Archbishop charles Cardinal Borromeo He was sent in the same year on the English mission.

In 1583 he took relics of Edmund Campion to Reims. On 22 January 1608 Pope Paul V nominated him archpriest of England, when George Blackwell was deposed in consequence of his acceptance of the Oath of Allegiance to James I. The new archpriest was admonished to dissuade Catholics from taking the oath and frequenting Protestant worship. Birkhead retained the post until his death in 1614, and was succeeded as archpriest by William Harrison.

== Sources ==
- This article incorporates text from a publication now in the public domain: "Birkhead, George". Dictionary of National Biography. London: Smith, Elder & Co. 1885–1900.
- Brady, W. Maziere (1876). The Episcopal Succession in England, Scotland and Ireland, A.D. 1400 to 1875. Vol. 3. Rome: Tipografia Della Pace. pp. 64–65.

Catholic Church titles
Preceded by George Blackwell	Archpriest of England; 1608–1614	Succeeded by William Harrison
