= Richard Smith (bishop) =

English Roman Catholic bishop

The Right Reverend Richard Smith
- Vicar Apostolic of England
- Appointed: 29 November 1624
- Term ended: 1632
- Predecessor: William Bishop
- Successor: John Leyburn
- Other post: Titular Bishop of Chalcedon

Orders
- Ordination: 7 May 1592
- Consecration: 12 January 1625 by Bernardino Spada

Personal details
- Born: November 1568 Hamworth, England
- Died: 18 March 1655 (aged 86)
- Denomination: Roman Catholic
- Education: Trinity College, Oxford; English College

Richard Smith (November 1568 – 18 March 1655) was an English Catholic prelate who served as Vicar Apostolic of English from 1624 to 1632. Having studied at the English College in Rome, he taught at Valladolid and Seville.

== Life ==
Richard Smith was born in Lincolnshire, England in 1568. He studied at Trinity College, Oxford University where he became a Catholic and in 1586 was admitted to the English College, Rome where he studied under Robert Bellarmine.

Smith was ordained in Rome as a priest in 1592. He obtained his doctorate in theology at the English College, Valladolid, where he also taught philosophy. In 1598 became a professor of controversies at the English College of St Gregory in Seville.

In 1603 he went on the English mission at a time when Catholicism was officially banned, and could have faced death if caught and tried. He was well known at the Holy See, not only as a student, but as an agent on behalf of the English clergy. He served as chaplain to Viscountess Montague, wife of Anthony-Maria Browne, 2nd Viscount Montagu, at Battle Abbey in Sussex, England. Smith left Sussex in 1613 he became superior of the small body of English secular priests who had rented the Benedictine house in Paris called Arras College, where they devoted themselves to writing controversy.

== Vicar apostolic ==
Smith was appointed Apostolic Vicar for the whole of England, Wales and Scotland on 29 November 1624 and was consecrated Titular bishop of Chalcedon, in January 1625. He followed William Bishop, who had held the post for less than a year. He arrived in England in April 1625, and stayed in Turvey, Bedfordshire, at the house of Lord Montagu.

Unlike his predecessor, Smith claimed authority over Scotland, and asserted that no priest sent to England should exercise their faculties unless approved by him. He created new vicars and archdeacons, and issued a regulation that none of the regular clergy (i.e., priests belonging to religious orders) could hear confessions unless he was approved by Smith. His order that the laity should receive his ministers and officials put them in jeopardy of arrest. Smith had also managed to antagonize the Catholic nobles by arbitrarily assigning confessors, and threatening to make Lord Morley return to live with his wife.

The disputes had become so contentious that his residence in London became known and in 1628 a warrant was issued for his arrest. In March 1629, a reward of £100 was offered for his capture. Smith stayed with the French ambassador, the Marquess de Chateauneuf.

King Charles was aware of this. At a dinner during Lent, the King encouraged his pregnant wife to eat some meat, which the queen was reluctant to do without ecclesiastical permission. Whereupon the king turned to the ambassador and requested that he quickly send a servant to obtain the said permission, adding that he knew full well he would find the bishop there.

In the meantime, Pope Urban had the French nuncio remind Smith that he had been consecrated Bishop of Calcedon, not of England, and that his ordinary powers were both limited and revocable, that missionaries sent by the Holy See did not require his approval, and that he should work better with them. Upon receiving the brief through the Queen's chaplain, Robert Phillip, Smith decided that his position as Apostolic Vicar was untenable and went to France. His resignation was quickly accepted, and although he attempted to rescind it, he was forbidden to return to England

== Death ==
In Paris, Smith lived at first with Cardinal Richelieu until the latter's death in 1642. He held the title of commendatory abbot of Charroux Abbey, resigning that title in 1648. He died at the Paris priory of English Canonesses Regular of the Lateran, whose founding, under Mother Lettice Mary Tredway, C.R.L. (formally called Lady Treadway), he had supported.

== Works ==
Smith authored:

- "An answer to T. Bel's late Challenge" (1605), against Thomas Bell;
- "The Prudentiall Ballance of Religion", (1609);
- "Vita Dominae Magdalenae Montis-Acuti" i.e., Viscountess Montagu (1609);
- "De auctore et essentia Protestanticae Religionis" (1619), English translation, 1621;
- "Collatio doctrinae Catholicorum et Protestantium" (1622), tr. (1631);
- "Of the distinction of fundamental and not fundamental points of faith" (1645);
- "Monita quaedam utilia pro Sacerdotibus, Seminaristis, Missionariis Angliae" (1647);
- "A Treatise of the best kinde of Confessors" (1651);
- "Of the all-sufficient Eternal Proposer of Matters of Faith" (1653);
- "Florum Historiae Ecclesiasticae gentis Anglorum libri septem" (1654).

== See also ==
- James I of England

== Sources ==
- Leys, M. D. R., Catholics in England 1559-1829: A social history (London : Camelot Press Ltd., 1961)

Attribution

Catholic Church titles
Preceded by William Bishop	Apostolic Vicar of England; 1624–1632	Vacant Title next held by John Leyburn
