= George Blackwell (priest) =

English Roman Catholic Archpriest

The Reverend Father George Blackwell, B.D.
- Archpriest of England
- Church: Roman Catholic Church
- Appointed: March 1598
- Term ended: 1 February 1608
- Successor: George Birkhead

Orders
- Ordination: 1575

Personal details
- Born: circa 1545 Middlesex, England
- Died: 12 January 1613 (aged c. 68) The Clink, Southwark, England
- Denomination: Roman Catholic

Father George Blackwell (c. 1545 – 12 January 1613) was Roman Catholic Archpriest of England from 1597 to 1608.

== Biography ==
Blackwell was born in Middlesex, England about 1545, perhaps the son of the pewterer Thomas Blackwell. He was admitted as a scholar to Trinity College, Oxford on 27 May 1562. He graduated with a bachelor's degree in 1563, and became a probationer of the college in 1565, a fellow in 1566, and graduated MA in 1567. He then removed to Gloucester Hall, a house much suspected of Catholic tendencies.

He resigned or was ejected from Trinity College in 1571, probably for his religious beliefs, and in 1574 left England for the English College, Douai. He was ordained priest in 1575, and graduated BST from the University of Douai the same year.

Father George Blackwell returned to England as a missionary in November 1576. He was imprisoned in 1578 for his work as a priest. After being released from prison, he lived and worked from the house of Mrs. Meany in Westminster, England in secret.

In 1601 a government spy described Blackwell as "about 50 years of age, his head brownish, his beard more black, cut after the fashion of a spade, of stature indifferent, and somewhat thick, decently attired"

=== Appointment as Archpriest ===
After the death of Cardinal Allen in 1594, the leadership of the clandestine Catholic Mission in England was thrown into disarray. On 7 March 1598, Pope Clement VIII appointed Blackwell archpriest over the secular clergy in England. Six assistants were named for him and another six were left to his discretion. As Archpriest, he lodged at the town house of Anthony-Maria Browne, 2nd Viscount Montagu, when in London. His instructions enjoined him to work in close consultation with the head of the Jesuit mission in England.

A number of secular priests in England, thinking Blackwell was too close to the Jesuits, appealed to the Pope to overturn Blackwell's appointment and name a vicar apostolic with full episcopal powers. Bitter controversy followed on this appeal, and two more appeals followed. According to John Hungerford Pollen, Blackwell's "main defect appears to have been an entire want of experience in government, Joined wit xaggerated ideas of his position as Superior."

The English government was keen to turn the controversy to its advantage, and encouraged Blackwell's "Appellant" enemies behind the scenes. The upshot of the third and final appeal was that Blackwell's powers were confirmed, but he was censured for his lack of tact and ordered in future not to communicate to the Jesuits any matters pertaining solely to the mission of the secular clergy.

=== Removal as Archpriest ===
Following the Gunpowder Plot, Blackwell wrote to Rome and obtained a letter from Pope Paul V condemning the plot and calling on English Catholics not to disturb the peace. Part of the English government's response was to enforce a new oath of allegiance, drafted in such a way that it was bound to create divisions within the English Catholic community as to whether it could be taken in good conscience. In particular, one passage of the oath could be read as giving the English authorities the right to define heresy.

He wrote an open letter to the English clergy, urging them to do the same. He insisted that the oath could legitimately be read as not contradicting the pope's "Supremacie in spirituall causes". The Pope, however, condemned the new oath soon afterwards. Blackwell, and some others, continued to defend the oath despite this. An international theological controversy developed concerning the licitness of the oath.

Blackwell was captured near Clerkenwell on 24 June 1607. He was initially at the Gate-House in Westminster, and then at The Clink in Southwark. Over the following ten days he was questioned several times as to whether or not he had been aware of the Gunpowder Plot, and about his opinion of the oath. At the end of that period he was tendered the oath, which he took.

Blackwell's interpretation of the oath did not satisfy the Pope himself, who relieved Blackwell of his position as archpriest, nor the English authorities, who kept him imprisoned for the remainder of his life.

=== Death and legacy ===
George Blackwell died in The Clink on 12 January 1613.

== Sources ==
- "Blackwell, George". Dictionary of National Biography. London: Smith, Elder & Co. 1885–1900.
- "Blackwell, George" (by subscription). Oxford Dictionary of National Biography website .
- D. A. Bellenger, ed., English and Welsh priests, 1558–1800 (1984), p. 40
- John Hungerford Pollen, The Institution of the Archpriest Blackwell (1916)
- T. G. Law, ed., The Archpriest Controversy: Documents Relating to the Dissensions of the Roman Catholic Clergy, 1597–1602, 2 vols, Camden new series 56 & 58 (1896–1898)
- Peter Milward, Religious Controversies of the Elizabethan Age: A Survey of Printed Sources (1977)
- Peter Milward, Religious Controversies of the Jacobean Age: A Survey of Printed Sources (1978)
- A. O. Meyer, England and the Catholic Church under Queen Elizabeth, translated by J. R. McKee (1916), reprinted with an introduction by John Bossy (1967), pp. 411–50

Catholic Church titles
New title	Archpriest of England; 1598–1608	Succeeded by George Birkhead
