= Henry Wilkinson =

Henry Wilkinson may refer to:

- Henry Wilkinson (1610–1675) (called "Long Harry"), English divinity professor and nonconformist
- Henry Wilkinson (1616–1690) (called "Dean Harry"), English philosophy professor and nonconformist
- Henry Clement Wilkinson (1837–1908), British Army officer
- Henry Spenser Wilkinson (1853–1937), professor of military history and writer
- H. B. Wilkinson (1870–1954), Arizona politician
- Henry Wilkinson (cricketer) (1877–1967), English first-class cricketer
- Henry Wilkinson (footballer, born 1883), English footballer
- Henry Wilkinson, early owner of Wilkinson Sword Company

== See also ==
- Harry Wilkinson (disambiguation)
