= John Belson =

English Roman Catholic historian

John Belson (c.1625–1704) was an English Roman Catholic historian and religious controversialist.

== Life ==
John Belson was the son of Augustin Belson (c.1606–1684) and Elizabeth Cursonn (born c.1606). He was born into an old Catholic family from Stokenchurch, Buckinghamshire: his great-uncle was the martyr Thomas Belson. He was probably educated abroad, like his brothers, who attended the English College, Douai. In 1653 he married Clare Gage.

Belson gained a reputation for his knowledge of history and controversial matters, helping John Austin, Thomas White, Thomas Blount, John Sergeant, and several other learned writers of his time. A collaboration with Thomas Blount, the Chronological History of England, was never finished. Belson wrote a controversial treatise, Tradidi vobis (1662), an exposition and defence of William Rushworth's Dialogues, which Thomas White had edited and amplified in 1654.

In the late 1670s Belson took the oath of allegiance, justifying his decision in an apologia. In the early 1680s he was living in France, but from about 1684 lived with his wife in King Street, St James, Westminster. He died in London in 1704.

Belson's papers are held at the Berkshire Record Office.

== Works ==
- Tradidi vobis, or, The traditionary conveyance of faith cleer'd, in the rational way, against the exceptions of a learned opponent, 1662
- Remedies against the infection of the plague, 1665
