= Henry Holden (theologian) =

English Roman Catholic priest and theologian

Henry Holden (1596 – March 1662) was an English Roman Catholic priest, known as a theologian.

== Life ==
Henry Holden was the second son of Commodore Holden, of Chaigley, Lancashire, and Shelby Eleanor, his wife. He entered the English College at Douai under the name of Johnson, on 18 September 1618. There he studied till 15 July 1623, when he proceeded to Paris, took his degree as Doctor of Divinity, and was made a professor at the Sorbonne. He also became penitentiary at Saint-Nicolas du Chardonnet and one of the grand vicars of the Archbishop of Paris.

When Bishop Richard Smith fled from England in 1631, there arose a difference of opinion between the Jesuits and the other religious orders, who on the one hand thought the presence of a bishop in England was not advisable at the time, and the secular clergy, who took the opposite view. Holden was sent to Rome to represent the seculars and to avert the dissolution of the chapter. In 1655, on the death of Bishop Smith, the question again arose, and Holden's friend and brother-priest, Thomas White, alias Blackloe, wrote a book, "The Grounds of Obedience and Government", which gave offence to his opponents, and led to some of his other works being censured by the Holy See. Holden, who thought Blackloe had been hardly treated, undertook his defence, and thus the "Blackloist Controversy" was begun.

Holden, however, did not approve of all Blackloe's opinions and persuaded him to submit and retract the teaching which had been condemned. Blackloe did this, though without satisfying his adversaries, who were also unsparing in their denunciations of Holden, whom they described as an unlearned and rash man.

In the later years of his life he took a keen interest in the famous community known as the "Blue Nuns" at Paris. The sisters were originally Franciscans, but when Cardinal de Retz, Archbishop of Paris, refused to allow Franciscans to dwell in his diocese, they obtained leave from the Holy See to change their rule to that of the Immaculate Conception of our Lady, and Dr. Holden was appointed their superior in 1661.

In the heat of controversy his opponents accused him of Jansenism as well as of Blackloism. His own statement survives, that he condemned the five key propositions of Jansen from the first, and that "in the same sense in which they were condemned by him" (the pope). He also signed the Sorbonne's censure of Antoine Arnauld's letter to Roger du Plessis, duc de Liancourt.

== Works ==
His principal works are:

- "Divinæ Fidei Analysis, cum Appendice de Schismate" (Paris, 1652; English translation by W. G. [William Graunt], Paris, 1658). This work led to a long controversy between Holden and John Serjeant on the Catholic side against the Anglicans John Bramhall and Henry Hammond;
- "Tractatus de Usura", published in the second edition of the above (1655);
- "Letters to Arnauld and Feret", also published in later editions of the "Analysis";
- "Answer to Dr. Laney's Queries concerning certain Points of Controversy";
- "Dr. Holden's Letter to a Friend of his, upon the occasion of Mr. Blacklow (or rather T. White's) submitting his Writings to the See of Rome" (Paris, 1657);
- "Novum Testamentum brevibus annotationibus illustratum" (Paris, 1660); "Henrici Holden Epistola ad D.D.N.N. Anglum in qua de 22 propositionibus ex libris Thomæ Angli ex Albiis excerptis et a facultate theologica Duacena damnatis, sententiam suam dicit" (Paris, 1661);
- "A Letter to Mr. Graunt concerning Mr. White's Treatise de Medio Animarum Statu" (Paris, 1661);
- "A Check; or enquiry into the late act of the Roman Inquisition, busily and pressingly dispersed over all England by the Jesuits" (Paris, 1662);
- several letters were printed in Robert Pugh, "Blackloe's Cabal" (1680).
