= William Rushworth =

William Rushworth may refer to:

- William Rushworth (cricketer) (1914–1966), English cricketer
- William Rushworth (trade unionist) (1879–1929), English trade union leader
- William Rushworth (organ builder) (1807–?), English organ builder
- William Rushworth (priest) (died 1637), English Roman Catholic priest
