= Harry Wilkinson =

Harry Wilkinson may refer to:

- Harry Wilkinson (footballer, born 1883) (1883–?), English footballer
- Harry Wilkinson (footballer, born 1903) (1903–1997), English footballer
- Harry Wilkinson (footballer, born 1926), English footballer
- Harry Wilkinson (rugby) (1864–1942), rugby union footballer of the 1880s for England and Halifax
- Harry Wilkinson (rugby league), rugby league footballer of the 1920s, 1930s and 1940s
- Harry Wilkinson (rugby union) (1903–1988), rugby union footballer of the 1920s and 1930s for England and Halifax

== See also ==
- Harry Wilkinson Moore (1850–1915), English architect
- Henry Wilkinson (disambiguation)
- Harold Wilkinson (disambiguation)
