= Humphrey Ellis =

English Roman Catholic priest

Humphrey Ellis, D.D. (died 1676), was an English Roman Catholic priest, real name Waring, a leader of English Catholics in the Commonwealth period.

== Life ==
Ellis belonged to a family "of great antiquity and good account", and finished his theological studies at the English College at Douay. On 25 August 1628 he was sent from Douay, with nine other students, under the care of the Rev. Joseph Harvey, to take possession of the newly founded English College of Lisbon. There he pursued his theological studies under Thomas White (alias Blackloe), and by degrees became professor of philosophy and divinity, doctor in the latter faculty, and president of the college. Afterwards he returned to England.

In 1649 he was involved in the interrogation of William and Mary Gadbury who were tried twice after he claimed to be Jesus Christ and she claimed to be Christ's spouse. Both recanted but Mary was mistreated to encourage her compliance. In 1650 he published his account of the crimes and trials.

Ellis was elected dean of the Old Chapter at the general assembly held in November 1657, but he did not take the oath attached to the office until 14 October 1660, although in the meantime he acted in the capacity of dean.

Some Jesuits and Franciscans were opposed to the reintroduction of a Catholic bishop in England. Claudius Agretti, canon of Bruges and minister apostolic in Belgium, sent by Pope Clement IX on a mission to examine Catholic affairs in England in 1669, stated in his report that Ellis was anxious for the confirmation of the status of the chapter; and was willing that the Pope should create afresh a new dean and chapter. Agretti doubted, however, whether they would really assent to this outcome. He described Ellis as "noble, esteemed, learned, and moderate" but tinged with "Blackloism".

Ellis died in July 1676.
