= Robert Pugh (disambiguation) =

Robert Pugh (born 1948) is a Welsh actor.

Robert Pugh may also refer to:

- Bob Pugh (Robert Archibald Lewis Pugh, 1909-1986), Welsh footballer for Newport County
- Robert G. Pugh (1924–2007), attorney in Shreveport, Louisiana
- Robert Pugh (MP), Member of Parliament (MP) for Caernarvonshire
- Robert Pugh (Jesuit) (1610–1679), Welsh Jesuit priest and controversialist
- Robert L. Pugh (born 1931–2013), American diplomat
