= John Austin (1613–1669) =

John Austin or Austen (born 1613 at Walpole, Suffolk, England; died London, 1669) was an English lawyer, controversial writer, and one of the founding Fellows of the Royal Society.

== Life ==
He was a student of St. John's College, Cambridge, and of Lincoln's Inn, and about 1640 became a Catholic. He was well regarded in his profession and was looked on as a master of English style.

His time was entirely devoted to books and literary pursuits. He enjoyed the friendship of such scholars as the antiquary Thomas Blount, Christopher Davenport (Franciscus a Santa Clara), John Sergeant, and others.

== Works ==
- The Christian Moderator; or Persecution for Religion condemned by the Light of Nature, by the Law of God, the Evidence of our Principles, but not by the Practice of our Commissioners for Sequestrations—In Four Parts (London, 1652, 4to.) Published under the pseudonym of William Birchley, and in it he disclaims the papal deposing power. "In his work, Austin assuming the disguise of an independent, shows that Catholics did not really hold the odious doctrines vulgarly attributed to them, and makes an energetic appeal to the independents to extend to the adherents of the persecuted church such rights and privileges as were granted to other religious bodies"
- The Catholique's Plea; or an Explanation of the Roman Catholik Belief, concerning their Church, Manner of Worship, Justification, Civil Government, Together with a Catalogue of all the Poenal Statutes against popish Recusants, all which is humbly submitted to serious consideration, By a Catholick Gentleman (London, 1659, 18mo.) also under the pseudonym of William Birchley.
- Reflections upon the Oaths of Supremacy and Allegiance; or the Christian Moderator, The Fourth Part, By a Catholick Gentleman, an obedient son of the Church and loyal subject of his Majesty (London, 1661)
- A Punctual Answer to Doctor John Tillotson's book called 'The Rule of Faith'. (unfinished)
- Devotions, First Part: In the Ancient Way of Offices, With Psalms, Hymns, and Prayers for every Day in the Week, and every Holiday in the Year. It is not known when and where the first edition appeared; the second, a duodecimo, is dated 1672. An edition printed at Edinburgh, 1789, contains a life of the author, presumably by Charles Dodd. This work was adapted to the uses of the Anglican Church in George Hickes's Harmony of the Gospels, etc., (London, 1701), and was often reprinted as a stock book as "Hicks' Devotions".
- Devotions, Second Part, The Four Gospels in one, broken into Lessons, with Responsories, To be used with the Offices, Printed Anno Domini 1675 (2 vols., Paris, 12mo), a posthumous work, divided into short chapters with a verse and prayer at the end of each. The prayers, says Joseph Gillow, "gave rise to offense under the impression that they favoured Blackloe's doctrine concerning the middle state of souls, and on account of this the work was not republished". A third part of the "Devotions" was never printed; it contained, according to the author's own statement "Prayers for all occasions framed by an intimate friend according to his (Austin's) directions, and overlooked by himself".

Austin also wrote several anonymous pamphlets against the theologians who sat in the Westminster Assembly.
