= Nicholas Clagett the Younger =

English controversialist

Nicholas Clagett the Younger, D.D. (1654–1727), was an English controversialist.

== Life ==
Clagett was the son of the Rev. Nicholas Clagett the elder, of Bury St. Edmunds, and the younger brother of the controversialist William Clagett. He was baptised 20 May 1654, and was educated at the Norwich Grammar School. In 1671 he was admitted to Christ's College, Cambridge, and took the degrees of B.A. and M.A, in due course. In 1680, upon the removal of his brother to the preachership of Gray's Inn, he was elected preacher of St. Mary's Church, Bury St. Edmunds, in his room, which office he held for nearly forty-six years. Three years later he was also instituted to the rectory of Thurlow Parva in Norfolk, and in 1693 Dr. John Moore, then bishop of Norwich, who was well acquainted with his abilities and virtues, collated him to the archdeaconry of Sudbury. In 1704 he graduated D.D., and in 1707 he was instituted to the rectory of Hitcham, Suffolk.

He died in January 1727, and was buried in the chancel of the parish church in which he had been so long preacher. He is reported to have been a good preacher, and a charitable and blameless man. He had several children, among them being Nicholas Clagett, bishop of Exeter.

== Works ==
- A Persuasive to Peaceableness and Obedience, 1683.
- A Persuasive to an Ingenuous Trial of Opinions in Religion, 1685.
- Christian Simplicity, 1705.
- Truth defended and Boldness in Error rebuked; or a Vindication of those Christian Commentators who have expounded some Prophecies of the Messias not to be meant only of him, &c., 1710 (against William Whiston's Accomplishment of Scripture Prophecies).
- (ed.) Sermons by his brother William Clagett, collected and published 1689-93
