= John Betts (physician) =

English physician

John Betts (c. 1623 – 1695) was an English physician. His later professional standing was affected by his religious beliefs, and then his non-juring attitude after the Glorious Revolution.

== Life ==
The son of Edward Betts by his wife Dorothy, daughter of John Venables of Rapley in Hampshire, he was born at Winchester. After schooling at Winchester College, he was elected a scholar of Corpus Christi College, Oxford, in February 1643, and took the degree of B.A. on 9 February 1647.

Betts was ejected in 1648, during the parliamentary visitation of the University of Oxford. He applied himself to the study of medicine, and accumulated the degrees of M.B. and M.D. at Oxford on 11 April 1654. He was admitted a candidate of the College of Physicians of London on 30 September 1654 and a fellow on 20 October 1664.

A Roman Catholic, Betts practised with success in London, mostly among Catholics. Later he was appointed physician in ordinary to King Charles II. His position in the College of Physicians was influenced by religious and political issues. Richard Middleton Massey recorded that Betts had been excluded from it, in the period from 1679 to 1684, of the Exclusion Crisis and Popish Plot repression. With John Gother and others, Betts supported the building of Lime Street Chapel in 1686.

Censor of the College in 1671, 1673, 1685, and 1686, Betts was named an elect on 25 June 1685. On 1 July 1689 he was returned to the House of Lords as a "papist", and on 25 October 1692 was threatened with the loss of his place as an elect if he did not take the oath of allegiance to the king, William of Orange. He did not take the oath, but, now aging, was allowed to remain undisturbed in his position.

Betts was dead on 15 May 1695, when Edward Hulse was named an elect in his place; and he was buried at St Pancras.

== Works ==
Betts published:

- De ortu et natura Sanguinis, London, 1669. George Thomson criticised this treatise in his True way of Preserving the Blood in its integrity. It included:
- Anatomia Thomæ Parri annum centesimum quinquagesimum secundum et novem menses agentis, cum clariss. viri Gulielmi Harveii aliorumque adstantium Medicorum Regiorum observationibus. This was an account of the post-mortem examination of Old Tom Parr. Anthony Wood claimed that it was drawn up by William Harvey. The manuscript was given to Betts by William's nephew Michael Harvey.
- Medicinæ cum Philosophia naturali consensus, London, 1692.

== Family ==
His son Edward Betts also became a physician, and died on 27 April 1695.
