= Lime Street Chapel =

Former Roman Catholic chapel in the City of London

Lime Street Chapel was a Roman Catholic place of worship in the City of London, in use during a short period of the reign of James II and VII of Great Britain.

== History ==
In 1686 John Gother with John Betts and others founded a chapel on London's Lime Street. All Catholic places of worship in London at the time were private, attached to the court or diplomatic residences. The chapel constructed was evidently larger than the needs of a private household, and in March 1686 Robert Geffrye, the Lord Mayor, tried to have building stopped. Harris calls the development of this place of worship a "transparent sham". Geffrye was encouraged to intervene by a group including the clerics Henry Compton and William Sherlock, and the Whig politician Robert Clayton. Pedro Ronquillo Briceño, Spanish ambassador in London, commented on the atmosphere of rumour which surrounded the construction. He also noted that many believed that the founding group of priests were the main force.

The chapel was shortly given a diplomatic status, with James Stanford, Resident for Philip William, Elector Palatine, as owner: he was an English Catholic, considered to have been acting as a figurehead for a group of influential Catholics. James II backed the chapel's construction. Besides the king's support, there were contributions from Catholic merchants and priests. The Elector Palatine's views were not consulted.

The house on which the chapel was based had been leased by Betts, in 1676. It was later associated with Thomas Abney as Lord Mayor. The chapel was a separate structure, constructed possibly after Stanford (name given at the time also as Stamford or Sandford) had made a chapel in the house, and involved Catholic priests. There were hostile attentions from April 1686.

The king required Stanford to bring in Jesuit priests, in June 1686, to replace the secular priests originally employed. There was a peaceful period of two years, in which a school was established, linked to the chapel. One of the Jesuits was Alexander Keynes (1641–1712), from a Somerset recusant family of Compton Pauncefoot. The school, in Fenchurch Street, was adjacent to the house and chapel, and was one of two in James II's London run by Jesuits.

The chapel's activity came to an end in 1688. When Charles Petre SJ, brother of Edward Petre, preached there on 30 September against the King James Version, there was a riot, on which John Evelyn reported: Petre was removed from the pulpit, which was damaged, as was the altar. The chapel was protected against another attack on 29 October, by the trained bands and the watch.

== Aftermath ==
Following the Glorious Revolution, James Stanford moved to Lancashire, where he lived in the Ribble Valley area. He had raised funds for Catholic churches in London, but the Elector Palatine wanted nothing to do with those efforts. Some of his papers passed into the Tempest Manuscripts, of Stephen Tempest of Broughton Hall, Skipton in Yorkshire.

Stanford (name recorded as "Stanphord") died on 6 December 1695 at Stydd. He was then of Clayton-le-Dale, and left a charitable foundation, "Stanford's Dole", with money to provide support for the poor, especially Catholics, of Stydd, Ribchester and the adjacent manor of Bailey. At this period, Catholic charitable bequests were hedged around by legal restrictions.

Stephen Tempest (1654–1742) was one of Stanford's executors, and his family were involved in the Stanford Trust to fund a local Catholic priest at Ribchester. Lady Tempest, the daughter of Sir Thomas Gascoigne, 2nd Baronet put on trial and acquitted at York, as part of the Barnbow accusations which were an offshoot of the Popish Plot fabrications, was his aunt. The Stanford Trust exists as a registered charity.
