= William Clagett =

William Clagett may refer to:

- William Clagett (controversialist) (1646–1688), English clergyman and controversialist
- William B. Clagett (1854–1911), Maryland tidewater tobacco farmer
- William H. Clagett (1838–1901), American politician and lawyer
