= Harold Wilkinson =

Harold Wilkinson may refer to:

- Harold Wilkinson (footballer, born 1926)
- Harold Arthur Faulkner Wilkinson, Australia soldier and public servant

== See also ==
- Harry Wilkinson (disambiguation)
