= Peter Gooden =

Peter Gooden (died 1695) was an English Roman Catholic priest, who came to prominence as a controversialist during the reign of James II.

== Life ==
Born near Manchester, he was educated in the English College at Lisbon, and after being ordained priest was sent back to England on mission, in company with Edward Barlow, alias Booth. He appears first to have been chaplain to the Middletons at Leighton Hall, near Lancaster. About 1680 he removed to Aldcliffe Hall, the seat of the seven daughters of Robert Dalton. There Gooden educated young boys, who were afterwards sent to Catholic seminaries abroad.

After the accession of James II, he was appointed chaplain to the regiment of James FitzJames, 1st Duke of Berwick. At that period he had frequent discussion with Edward Stillingfleet, William Clagett, and other Church of England clergy. The Glorious Revolution of 1688 obliged him to retire to his old place at Aldcliffe Hall, where he died on 29 December 1695.

== Works ==
He published:

- The Controversial Letters on the Grand Controversy, concerning the pretended temporal authority of the Popes over the whole earth; and the true Sovereignty of kings within their own respective kingdoms; between two English Gentlemen, the one of the Church of England, and the other of the Church of Rome, 2nd edit. 1674. This was against Thomas Birch, vicar of Preston, Lancashire from 1682 till his death in 1700.
- The Sum of the Conference had between two Divines of the Church of England and two Catholic Lay-Gentlemen. At the request and for the satisfaction of three Persons of Quality, Aug. 8, 1671, London, 1687. An earlier edition was published (1684).

His conference with Stillingfleet gave rise to the publication of several controversial pamphlets, and The Summ of a Conference on Feb. 21, 1686, between Dr. Clagett and Father Gooden, about the point of Transubstantiation, was published in 1689–90 by William Wake. It is reprinted in Seventeen Sermons, &c. by William Clagett, 3rd edit., London, 1699, vol. i.
