= Lancet window =

Tall, narrow window with a pointed arch at its top

A lancet window is a tall, narrow window with a sharp pointed arch at its top. This arch may or may not be a steep lancet arch (in which the compass centres for drawing the arch fall outside the opening). It acquired the "lancet" name from its resemblance to a lance. Instances of this architectural element are typical of Gothic church edifices of the earliest period. Lancet windows may occur singly, or paired under a single moulding, or grouped in an odd number with the tallest window at the centre.

The lancet window first appeared in the early French Gothic period (c. 1140–1200), and later in the Early English period of Gothic architecture (1200–1275). The lancet window feature was so common that this era is sometimes known as the "Lancet Period".

The term lancet window is properly applied to single-light windows of austere form, without tracery. Paired windows were sometimes surmounted by a simple opening such as a quatrefoil cut in plate tracery. This form gave way to the more ornate, multi-light traceried window.

== Examples ==
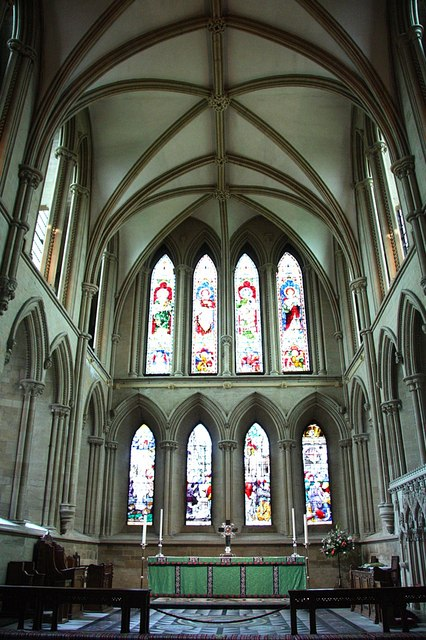
Early English lancet windows, built 1234, east end of Southwell Minster, Nottinghamshire, England.

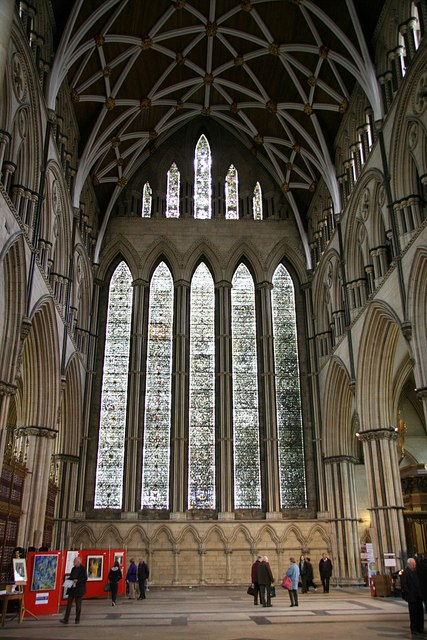
The so-called 'Five Sisters Window' in York Minster: a group of lancets with original grisaille glass.

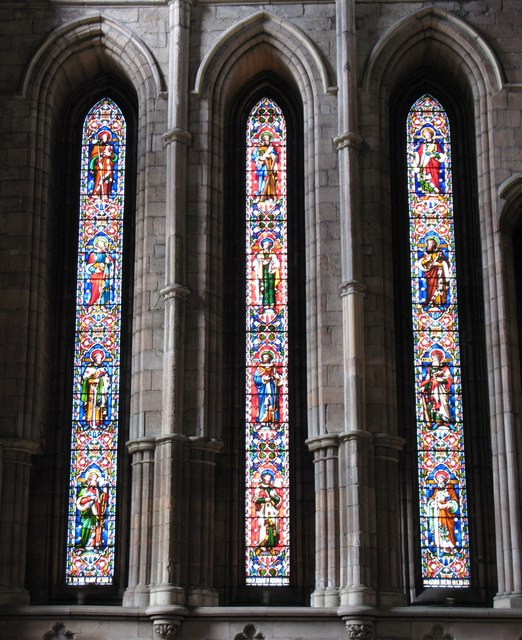
Lancet windows in Hexham Priory, Northumberland.

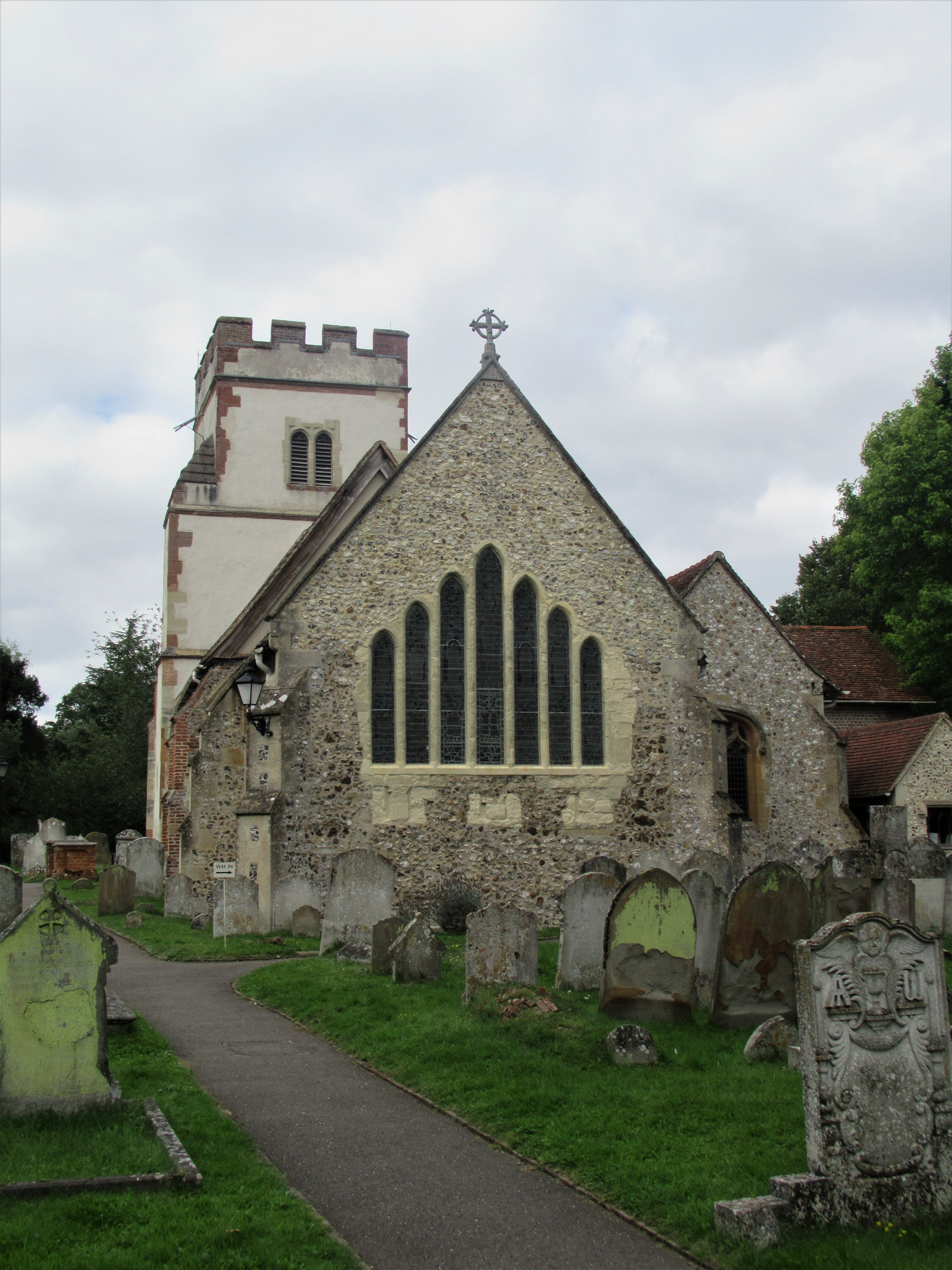
A group of seven stepped lancets at Ockham church, Surrey.

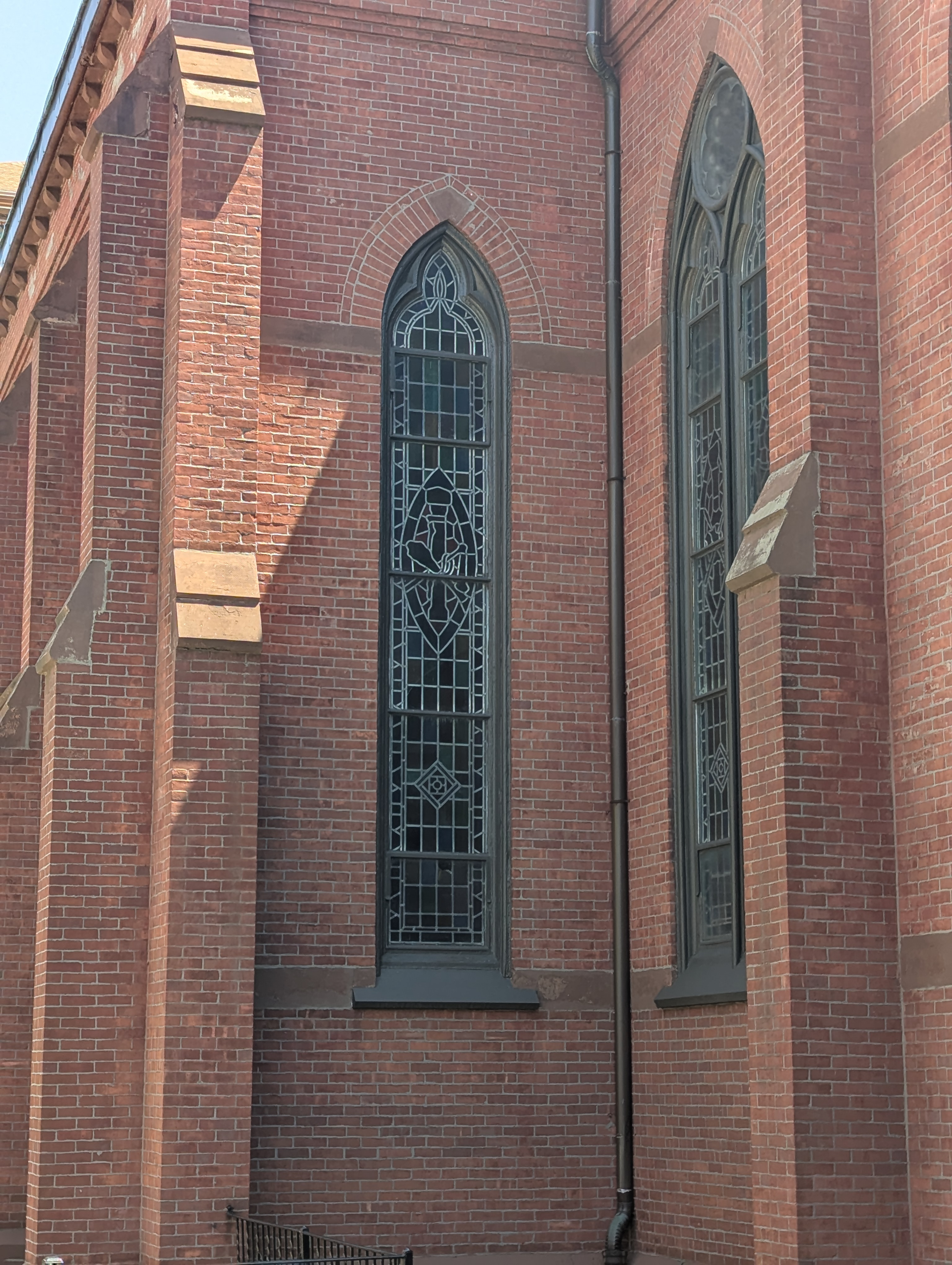
Lancet window at St. Mary Roman Catholic Church, Long Island City.

== See also ==
- Church window
- Monofora
- Polifora
