= Nicholas Clagett the Elder =

English Puritan cleric and ejected minister

Nicholas Clagett (c. 1610 – 1662) was an English Puritan cleric and ejected minister.

== Life ==
Clagett was baptised at Canterbury on 16 December 1610, and in 1628 entered Merton College, Oxford, where he proceeded B.A. in October 1681. He then migrated to Magdalen Hall, and commenced M.A. in June 1634, reputed in philosophy.

About 1636 Clagett became vicar of St Michael with St Mary's Church, Melbourne, Derbyshire and about 1644 he was chosen lecturer or preacher at St. Mary's Church, Bury St. Edmunds, Suffolk, where he was popular with the "precise party". After the Restoration he was ejected from the preachership for nonconformity. He died by 16 October 1662, when his will was proved, and was buried in the chancel of St Mary's Church.

== Family ==
With his wife Jane, who died at Bury St Edmunds on 23 August 1673, Clagett had two sons who became noted ministers, William Clagett and Nicholas Clagett the younger.

== Works ==
Clagett published The Abuse of God's Grace; discovered in the Kinds, Causes, Punishments, Symptoms, Cures, Differences, Cautions, and other Practical Improvements thereof. Proposed as a seasonable check to the wanton Libertinisme of the present Age, Oxford, 1659. This was co-written with Henry Wilkinson.

It was dedicated to his "honoured cousin" William Clagot, and his "dear consort" the Lady Southcote.

== Notes ==
Attribution

- This article incorporates text from a publication now in the public domain: Cooper, Thompson (1887). "Clagett, Nicholas (1610?-1663)". Dictionary of National Biography. Vol. 10. p. 366.
