= William Clagett (controversialist) =

English clergyman

William Clagett (1646–1688) was an English clergyman, known as a controversialist.

== Life ==
William Clagett was the eldest son of Nicholas Clagett the Elder, a preacher at St. Mary's Church, Bury St Edmunds, Suffolk. He was born in the parish on 24 September 1646, and educated at Bury grammar school under Dr. Thomas Stephens, author of notes on Statius. He was admitted a pensioner of Emmanuel College, Cambridge on 5 September 1659, before the age of thirteen, under the tuition of Thomas Jackson. He graduated B.A. in 1663, M.A. in 1667, D.D. in 1683.

Clagett was elected preacher at St. Mary's Church, Bury St Edmunds, on 12 December 1672, and resigned on 17 June 1680 after being appointed preacher at Gray's Inn, London. He was made chaplain in ordinary to King Charles II in 1677. He was also presented to the rectory of Farnham Royal, Buckinghamshire by its Lord Keeper Francis North, 1st Baron Guilford, a kinsman of his wife's, and (instituted on 14 May 1683). Along with his preacher's place at Gray's Inn, Clagett held the lectureship of St Michael Bassishaw, to which he was elected about two years before his death; and he also served as chaplain in ordinary to James II.

On Sunday evening, 16 March 1688, after having preached at St Martin-in-the-Fields in his Lent course there, he succumbed to smallpox, and died on 28 March 1688. He was buried in a vault under the church of St Michael Bassishaw. John Sharp preached the funeral sermon. His wife, Thomasin North, died eighteen days later and was buried in the same grave.

== Works ==
Clagett took a leading part in the controversy carried on during the reign of James II respecting the points in dispute between Protestants and Catholics.

His works are:

- A Discourse concerning the Operations of the Holy Spirit; with a confutation of some part of Dr. Owen's book upon that subject, part i., London, 1677, part ii., London, 1680. Against John Owen; in the second part there is an answer to John Humfrey's Animadversions on the first part. Clagett wrote a third part, to prove that the Church Fathers were not on Owen's side, but the manuscript was burnt by accident. In 1719 Henry Stebbing published an edition of the first two parts.
- A Reply to a pamphlet called The Mischief of Impositions, by Mr. Alsop, which pretends to answer the dean of St. Paul's Sermon concerning the Mischief of Separation, London, 1681. Against Vincent Alsop, on behalf of Edward Stillingfleet.
- An Answer to the Dissenters' Objections against … the Liturgy of the Church of England, London, 1683.
- The Difference of the Case between the Separation of the Protestants from the Church of Rome, and the Separation of Dissenters from the Church of England, London, 1683.
- A Discourse concerning the Worship of the Blessed Virgin and the Saints, London, 1686.
- A Paraphrase, with Notes and Preface, upon the sixth chapter of St. John, London, 1686.
- Of the Humanity and Charity of Christians. A Sermon preached … 30 Nov. 1686.
- A View of the whole Controversy between the Representer and the Answerer, with an answer to the Representer's last reply; in which are laid open some of the methods by which Protestants are misrepresented by Papists, London, 1687. The 'Representer' was John Goter.
- Of the Authority of Councils and the Rule of Faith. By a Person of Quality … , London, 1687. The first two parts were written by a certain C. Hutchinson; the third, containing the 'Postscript' in answer to Abraham Woodhead, was written by Clagett.
- An Examination of Bellarmine's Seventh Note, of Union of the Members among themselves and with the Head, London, 1687. Against Robert Bellarmine.
- The Twelfth Note of the Church examined, viz. The Light of Prophecy, London, 1687.
- The School of the Eucharist established upon the miraculous respects and acknowledgments which beasts, birds, and insects, upon several occasions, have rendered to the Holy Sacrament of the Altar. Whence Catholicks may increase in devotion towards this divine Mystery, and Hereticks find there their confusion. By F. Toussain Bridoul, of the Society of Jesus. Printed in French at Lille, 1672, and now made English, and published with a Preface concerning the Testimony of Miracles,' London, 1687. Clagett supplied the Preface. Toussaint Bridoul (1595?–1672) was a Flemish Jesuit from Lille.
- An Abridgment of the Prerogatives of St. Ann, Mother of the Mother of God. With the Approbation of the Doctors at Paris; and thence done into English to accompany the Contemplations on the Life and Glory of Holy Mary; and the Defence of the same; with some Pieces of the like nature. To which a Preface is added concerning the Original of the Story, London, 1688.
- A Discourse concerning the pretended Sacrament of Extreme Unction … With a Letter to the Vindicator of the Bishop of Condom (i.e. Jacques-Bénigne Bossuet), London, 1688. The 'vindicator' was Joseph Johnston (secular name Henry Johnston), a Benedictine, of the King's Chapel.
- A Second Letter from the Author of the Discourse concerning Extreme Unction, to the Vindicator of the Bishop of Condom, London, 1688.
- The State of the Church of Rome when the Reformation began; as it appears by the advices given to Paul III and Julius III by creatures of their own, London, 1688.
- The Queries offered by T. W. to the Protestants concerning the English Reformation, reprinted and answered (anon.), London, 1688. The Catholic side was put by Thomas Ward.
- Notion of Idolatry considered and confuted, London, 1688.
- Several captious Queries concerning the English Reformation, first proposed by Dean Manby, and afterwards by T. W., briefly and fully answered, London, 1688. Against Peter Manby, Dean of Derry, and Thomas Ward.
- The Summ of a Conference on 21 Feb. 1686, between Dr. Clagett and Father Gooden, about the point of Transubstantiation, London, 1689. The Catholic side was taken by Peter Gooden.
- A Paraphrase and Notes upon the first, second, third, fourth, fifth, seventh, and eighth Chapters of St. John, London, 1693.
- His brother Nicholas Clagett the Younger published a collection of his Sermons.

The present State of the Controversie between the Church of England and the Church of Rome; or an account of the books written on both sides (London 1687) was by William Wake. Clagett saw it through the press, while Wake was in hiding in Dorchester, and it has been attributed to him.
