= Henry Wilkinson (1616–1690) =

English clergyman and academic

Henry Wilkinson (1616–1690) was an English clergyman and academic, Principal of Magdalen Hall, Oxford and White's Professor of Moral Philosophy, and later an ejected minister.

== Life ==
He was the son of William Wilkinson, curate or chaplain of Adwick le Street, Yorkshire and born there. John Wilkinson, Principal of Magdalen Hall and President of Magdalen College, Oxford, is stated by Anthony Wood to have been his uncle.

After some time at Edward Sylvester's school, Oxford, Henry matriculated from Magdalen Hall on 10 October 1634, aged 17. He graduated B.A. on 28 November 1635, M.A. on 26 May 1638, and became a noted tutor and dean of his house. When the First English Civil War broke out, Wilkinson left Oxford and joined the parliament, took the Solemn League and Covenant, and became a preacher in much request. He was appointed lecturer or minister of Buckminster, Leicestershire, in 1642, and was instituted vicar of Epping, Essex, on 30 October 1643.

He was appointed one of the parliamentary visitors of Oxford University on 1 May 1647. He was created B.D. on 14 April 1648, fellow and vice-president of Magdalen College on 25 May, principal of Magdalen Hall on 12 August 1648, and White's Professor of Moral Philosophy on 24 March 1649. A strong parliamentarian, Wilkinson entertained Oliver Cromwell, Thomas Fairfax, and the other commanders at Magdalen Hall on 19 May 1649, and, preaching before them next day, ‘prayed hard for the army’. A salary for preaching regularly at Carfax was voted him by the council of state on 27 May 1658.

At Oxford Wilkinson was known as ‘Dean Harry’ to distinguish him from his two contemporaries, Henry Wilkinson (1566–1647), and the latter's son Henry (1610–1675). Chancellor Hyde, on his visitation in September 1661, addressing him as ‘Mr. Dean,’ chided Wilkinson for the nonconformity of his house, and complained that it contained only ‘factious and debauched persons’; Wood's account adds that the Chancellor declared he was afraid to come to his hall.

Wilkinson was ejected from Magdalen Hall by the 1662 Act of Uniformity, although some of the heads of the university desired to keep him there, as a good disciplinarian. After again preaching for a short time at Buckminster he returned to Essex and settled at Gosfield. There, during an interim in the vicars (1669–72), he seems to have officiated at the parish church. The visitation book of the archdeaconry contains under date of 9 June 1671 an entry of his citation for not reading divine service according to the rubric. On 19 July he was pronounced contumacious and excommunicated. After the second indulgence he took out on 16 May 1672 a license to be a Presbyterian teacher at Gosfield, as well as one for his house to be a Presbyterian meeting-house. In 1673 he removed to the neighbouring parish of Sible Hedingham, where his library was distrained on his refusing to pay the fine for unlawful preaching. In November 1680 he was living at Great Cornard in Suffolk, where he remained until his death on 13 May 1690. He was buried at Milden, near Lavenham.

== Works ==
As well as sermons, Wilkinson published works in Latin, including:

- Conciones tres apud Academicos, Oxford, 1654.
- Brevis Tractatus de Jure Diei Dominicæ, Oxford, 1654.
- The Hope of Glory, Oxford, 1657.
- Conciones sex ad Academicos, Oxford, 1658.
- The Gospel Embassy, Oxford, 1658.
- De Impotentia Liberi Arbitrii ad bonum spirituale, Oxford, 1658.
- Three Decads of Sermons, Oxford, 1660.
- The Doctrine of Contentment briefly explained and practically applied, London, 1671.
- Two Treatises, London, 1681.
- The Abuse of God's Grace (with Nicholas Clagett)

He had a hand in compiling the Catalogus Librorum in Biblioth. Aulæ Magdalenæ, Oxford, 1661, and wrote prefaces to Henry Hurst's Inability of the Highest, &c., Oxford, 1659, and Nicholas Clagett's Abuse of God's Grace, Oxford, 1659; as well as an elegy in verse appended to his funeral sermon (Oxford, 1657) on Margaret Corbet, wife of Edward Corbet and daughter of Sir Nathaniel Brent.

His papers are held at the Bodleian Library.

== Family ==
Wilkinson married, first, Elizabeth, daughter of Anthony Giffard of Devonshire, who died on 8 December 1654, aged 41; and, secondly, Anne Benson. He had issue by both wives.
