= St Mary's Church, Bury St Edmunds =

St Mary's Church, Bury St. Edmunds
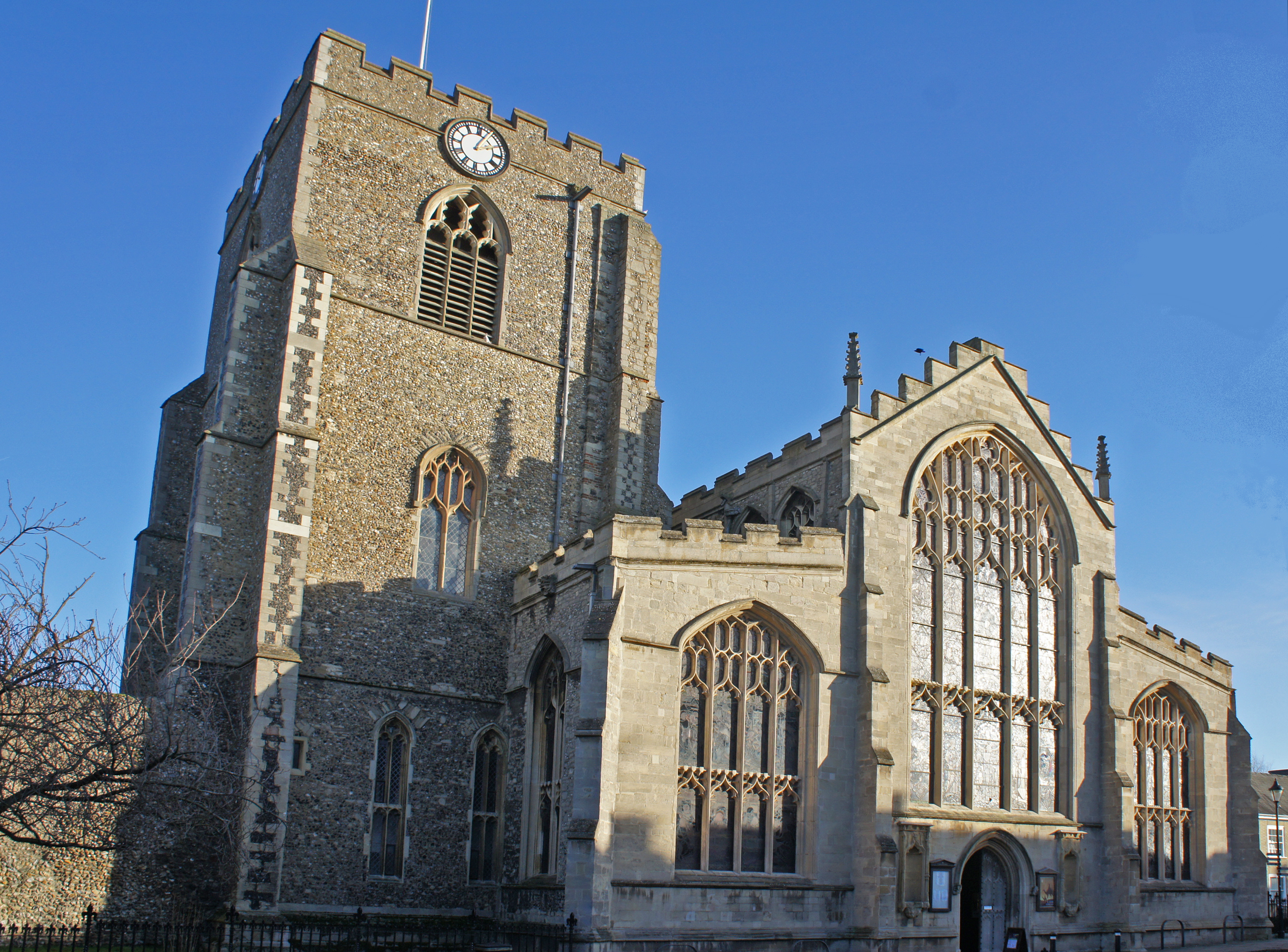
- St Mary's from Crown Street
- St Mary's Church, Bury St. Edmunds
- 52.2424°N 0.7172°E
- OS grid reference: TL 85604 63945
- Country: England
- Denomination: Church of England
- Previous denomination: Roman Catholic
- Website: www.wearechurch.net

History
- Founded: 11th Century
- Dedication: Assumption of the Blessed Virgin Mary

Architecture
- Style: Decorated
- Years built: 1424–1446

Specifications
- Length: 213ft

Administration
- Province: Canterbury
- Diocese: Diocese of St Edmundsbury and Ipswich
- Deanery: Thingoe
- Parish: St Mary with St Peter, Bury St Edmunds

Clergy
- Vicar: The Revd Christopher ("Tiffer") Robinson

St Mary's Church is the civic church of Bury St Edmunds in Suffolk, England and is one of the largest parish churches in England. It claims to have the second longest nave (after Christchurch Priory), and what is believed to be the largest west window of any parish church in the country. It was part of the abbey complex and originally was one of three large churches in the town (the others being St James, now St Edmundsbury Cathedral, and St Margaret's, now gone). The official full name of the church is The Church of the Assumption of the Blessed Virgin Mary.

== History ==
The present church is not the first building to stand on the site, the first being built in the seventh century, founded by King Sigeberht. The second church was built in the early twelfth century by Abbot Anselm to replace the previous church of St Mary which was demolished to make space for the construction of the south wing of the Abbey Church. However, nothing survives of the Norman church and the oldest part of the existing building is the decorated chancel (c. 1290). There was a major renovation between the 14th and 16th centuries and it is at this point that the nave, its aisles and the tower were built. It is also at this time that Mary Tudor, Queen of France, favourite sister of Henry VIII (not to be confused with his daughter Mary I of England), died and was buried in the abbey church. When the abbey was destroyed, her body was removed and reburied here in St Mary's. Her tomb is in the sanctuary directly to the north of the Lord's table. The church, however, is dedicated to Mary, the mother of Jesus, and not, as some mistakenly believe, to Mary Tudor. A tablet was erected to her memory in 1758. At the suggestion of Edward VII, who visited the church in 1904, a marble kerb surrounds her grave stone.

During the 16th century, John Notyngham and Jankyn Smyth, two wealthy local benefactors, bequeathed large amounts of money to the church. These funds contributed to building the north and south quire aisles, now the Lady Chapel and Royal Anglian (formerly Suffolk Regimental) chapel, two chantry chapels and a north and south porch. The north porch, known as the Notyngham porch, was built in 1437 in accordance with the will of John Notyngham. The south porch of 1523 was removed during a restoration in 1831. St Wolstan's chapel, on the north-west side, formerly held the Suffolk Regimental cenotaph until it was moved to the end of the north aisle. It now holds the church kitchen.

The west window is believed to be the largest of any parish church in the country, measuring 35 ft 6 in (10.82 m) by 8 ft 6 in (2.59 m).

Simon Jenkins, who awards the church three stars in his 1999 book England's Thousand Best Churches, writes:

The interior has one of the largest and most exhilarating naves in the country. Arcades of ten majestic bays march towards the chancel, each rising on continuous mouldings with only the tiniest of capitals. The unusually wide hammerbeam roof is a marvellous survival. Eleven pairs of angels guard the space below, attended by lesser angels on the wallplates and by saints, martyrs, prophets and kings, 42 figures in all. On the frieze a medieval menagerie takes over, with dragons, unicorns, birds and fish. ... The south chapel is littered with pleasant brasses. The north aisle by the tower has its memorials spectacularly displayed. They climb up the wall to the ceiling, a valhalla of Bury worthies..

== Choirs ==
Until recently, St Mary's Church had a traditional Anglican choir of boys and gentlemen, with a history dating back to as early as 1354, after which there are many references to singers and ‘childs with a surplys’. This tradition is believed to have remained untouched even during Puritan times. The choir has in the past toured Spain, Turkey, Cyprus, Israel and Malta, France, Belgium, and Germany, and has sung evensongs at cathedrals including Canterbury and St Paul's. The Choir is affiliated to the RSCM, and choristers are trained using the RSCM Voice for Life scheme.

2010 saw the inception of St Mary's Ladies' Choir, and the Girls' Choir began in 2015. Although they were formerly quite separate from the Church Choir, joining together only for large services, the choir is now mixed.

== Organ and bell ==
There is evidence for an organ in St Mary's as early as 1467, in the will of John Baret which states that ‘ye pleyers at ye orgenys [to be paid] ij d’. Another bequest from 1479 grants the organist 10d.

The main organ is a four-manual instrument with 79 speaking stops. Built initially by John Gray of London in 1825, it was rebuilt and enlarged in 1865, 1885, and 1898 by J. W. Walker. There have been later rebuilds by Hill, Norman and Beard in 1931, John Compton in 1959, and Kenneth Canter in 1988, the latter included providing a mobile console. The organ was over-hauled in 2009 by Clevedon Organ Services, and is equipped with a 250-channel memory.

A separate, portable four-stop chamber organ, possibly by John Harris (son of Renatus Harris, c. 1677 – 1743) is placed in the Suffolk Regimental Chapel and is occasionally used as a continuo instrument.

The bell weight is 27 cwt.

=== Organists ===
The following list is taken from Peter Tryon's book.

- Ralph Guest 1796–1822.
- Robert Nunn 1822–1863
- Thomas Bentick Richardson 1864–1893 (formerly chorister and assistant organist at Salisbury Cathedral)
- Matthew Kingston 1893–1896
- George William Boutell 1897–1909
- Edwin Percy Hallam 1909–1937 (subsequently organist at St Edmundsbury Cathedral)
- Clifton Cecil Day 1937–1942
- Dr Adcock 1942–1948
- Norman Holdford Jones 1948–1969
- John Fear 1969–1980
- David Ivory 1980–1982 (formerly assistant)
- Peter Tryon 1983–2015
- Adrian Marple 2015–2018 (formerly assistant; subsequently Director of Music at Inverness Cathedral)
- DB di Blasio 2018–2020 (formerly assistant)
- Richard Baker 2021–2022
- DB di Blasio 2023–present

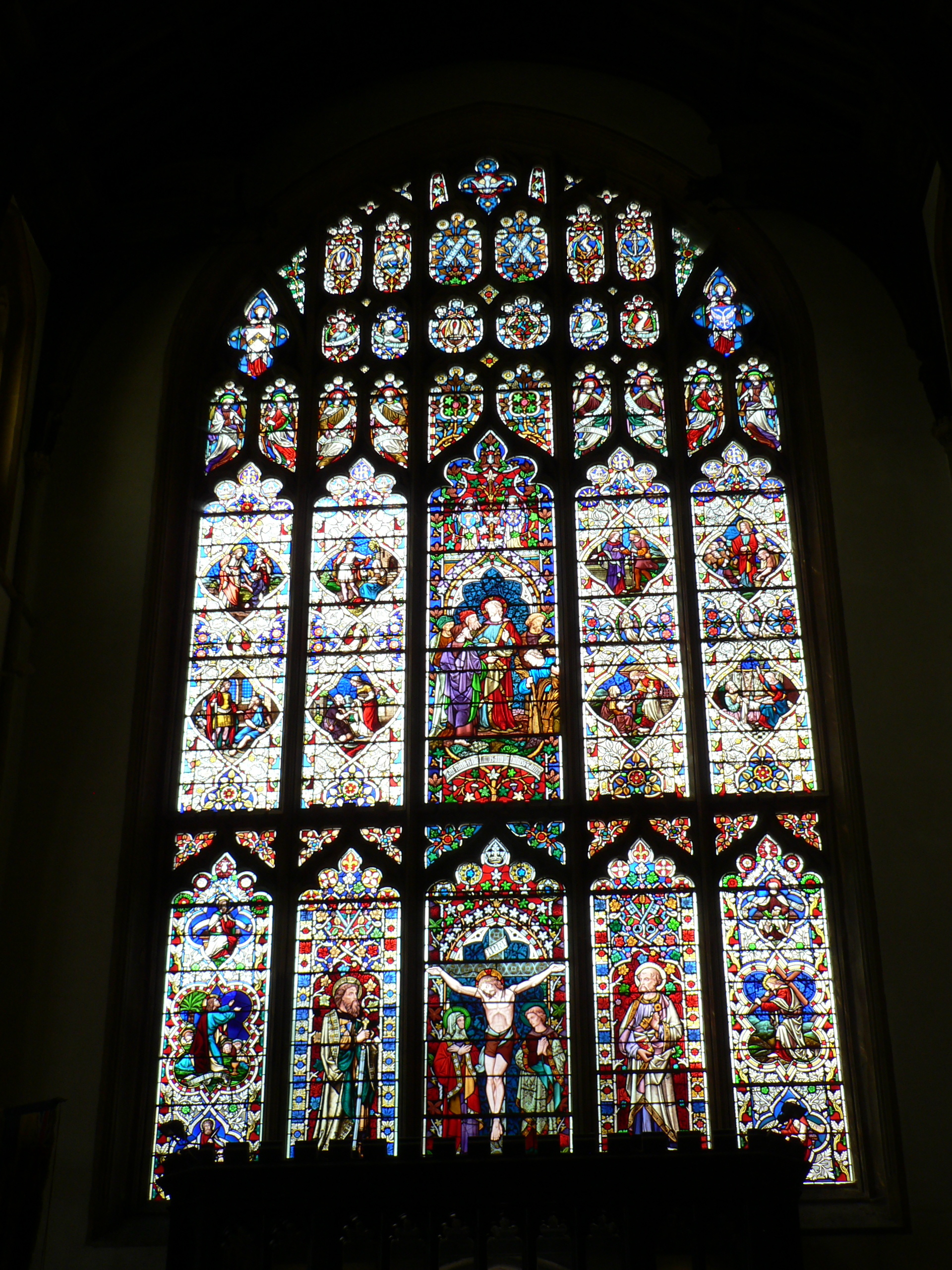
The west window of the church

== Notable burials ==
- Mary Tudor, Queen of France and sister of Henry VIII, (d. 1533).
- Nicholas Clagett the Elder (d. 1662), English Puritan cleric and ejected minister.
- Sir William Carew (d. 1501) of Bury St Edmunds, created a knight banneret by King Henry VII, after the Battle of Blackheath (1496). He was the fifth son of Nicholas III Carew of Mohuns Ottery in Devon, by his wife Joan Courtenay (born 1411), a daughter of Sir Hugh Courtenay (1358–1425) of Haccombe in Devon and of Boconnoc in Cornwall, MP and Sheriff of Devon, a grandson of Hugh de Courtenay, 2nd/10th Earl of Devon (1303–1377) and grandfather of Edward Courtenay, 1st Earl of Devon (d.1509)
- George Kirbye (d. 1634), madrigalist and churchwarden of St Mary's.
- Peter Gedge (d. 1818), founder of the Bury and Norwich Post
- John Reeve (d. 1540), last abbot of Bury St Edmunds
