= Harrison Oxley =

British organist

- Also known as: Fred Oxley
- Born: Thomas Frederick Harrison Oxley; 3 April 1933; England
- Died: 6 April 2009 (aged 76)
- Genres: Classical
- Occupation: Organist
- Instrument: Pipe organ
- Years active: 1957–2003

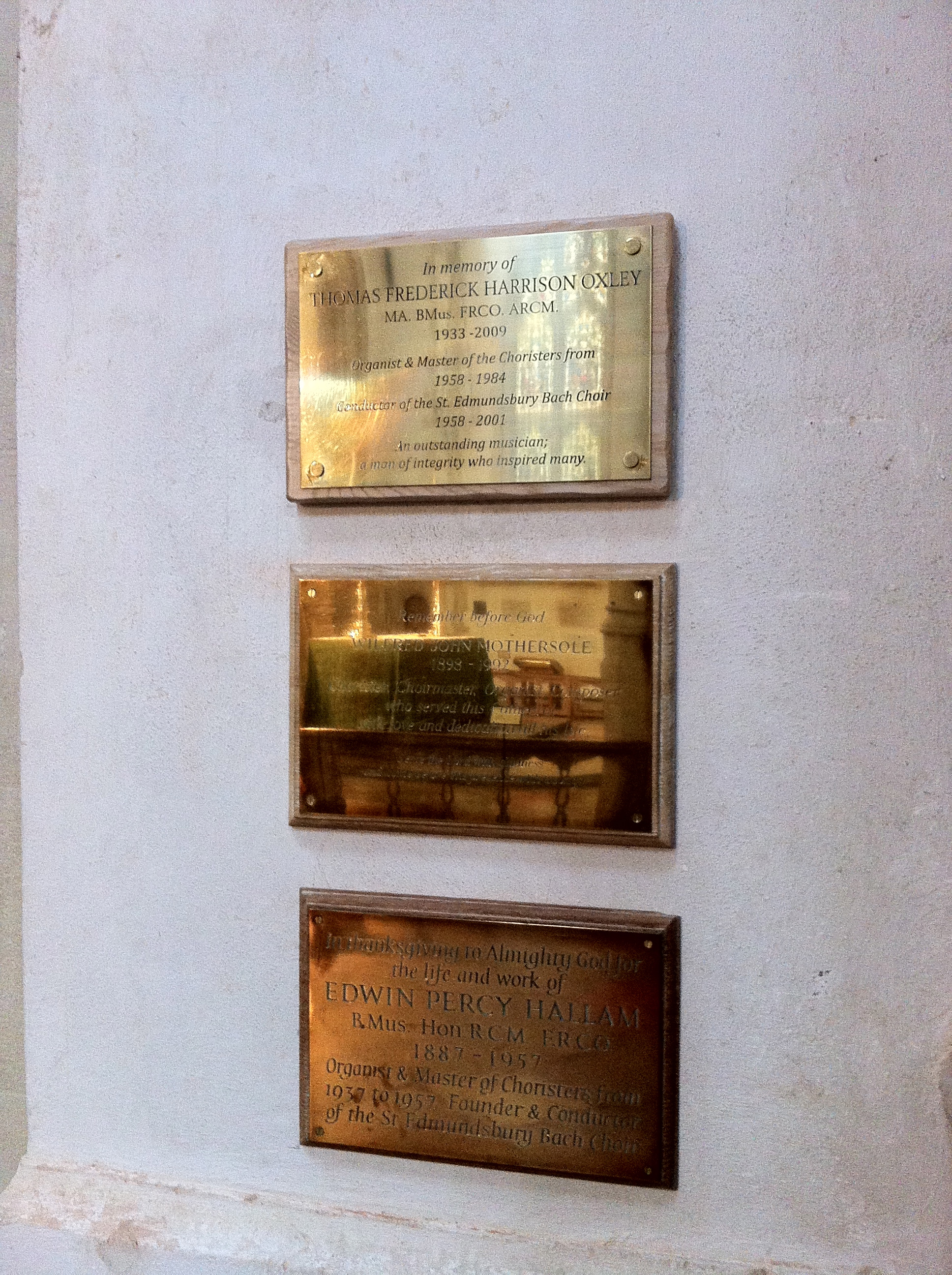
Top of these three plaques in St. Edmundsbury Cathedral is to Harrison Oxley

Thomas Frederick Harrison Oxley (known professionally as Harrison Oxley and socially as Fred Oxley) (3 April 1933 – 6 April 2009) was a British organist, who was appointed Organist of St Edmundsbury Cathedral aged 24. At the time, he was the youngest cathedral organist in the country. He was the first English cathedral organist to supplement the boys' voices in the cathedral choir with those of girls; he began to use girls' voices as early as the 1960s as a separate choir and to support the boys' voices for large events. The cathedral choir then became a permanent mixed treble line from the early 1970s until 1984.

== Life ==
Oxley was born on 3 April 1933. His father was an organist and metallurgist, and Oxley learned how to play the organ from watching his father at St Francis of Assisi's Church, Bournville, Birmingham, where he was the deputy organist. Aged 11, Oxley played for G. D. Cunningham, the Birmingham City Organist, whose advice was that Oxley should study at King Edward's School, Birmingham (to which he won a scholarship in 1946) and aim for a career as a musician. He won a silver medal from the Associated Board for his results in a piano examination when he was 12, and won the under-20 piano class aged 13. As a pupil at King Edward's, he studied under the school's Director of Music, Willis Grant, who appointed him as his Assistant. He became organ scholar of Christ Church, Oxford in 1951, under Thomas Armstrong; he was appointed assistant organist in 1953 and obtained a first-class degree in music from the University of Oxford in 1954. Oxley was a noted organ recitalist, in Britain and in the United States, and composed both choral and organ music, his 'Elegy' becoming a standard in the repertoire of 20th century organ music.

A stroke in 2003 meant that he had to re-learn how to play the piano and organ. His daughter, Ruth Oxley, said that he practised regularly, learning virtually "from scratch" after his stroke, and made an unexpected "amazing recovery" in terms of his playing. He died of heart failure on 6 April 2009; his funeral was held at St Edmundsbury Cathedral.

== St Edmundsbury Cathedral ==
After National Service, Oxley was appointed as Organist of St Edmundsbury Cathedral in 1957, aged 24 – the youngest cathedral organist at that time. His conducting of the Bury Bach Choir (with whom he worked until his retirement in 2001) was highly praised. Oxley controversially decided to introduce girls into the then all-male cathedral choir in the early 1970s. The mixed choir stopped some time after a new Provost of the cathedral took office in 1981 and began to phase out the girls. Oxley resigned in 1984 on a point of principle. He said that he had never been forgiven by some other cathedral organists for his actions in admitting girls but he could not see a reason to "bar half of humanity from the benefits and opportunities of cathedral choir membership." The cathedral choir only re-admitted girls on an equal footing in 2021. The St Cecilia Chorale, formed in 2002 by James Thomas, was the successor to the girls part of the cathedral choir, having erstwhile been under the directorship of Oxley after his resignation from St Edmundsbury, independently from the Cathedral. Before 2002 it operated under the name the St Cecilia Singers. Although girls have been reinstated back into the cathedral choir, Harrison Oxley's forward-thinking and pioneering work with girls' voices, ensuring equality of vocal opportunities, has been quite overlooked by some other English cathedrals, themselves claiming to be the first to have admitted girls.

Cultural offices
Preceded by Edward Percy Hallam	Organist and Master of the Choristers of St Edmundsbury Cathedral; 1958-1985	Succeeded by Paul Trepte
