= Edward Percy Hallam =

English cathedral organist

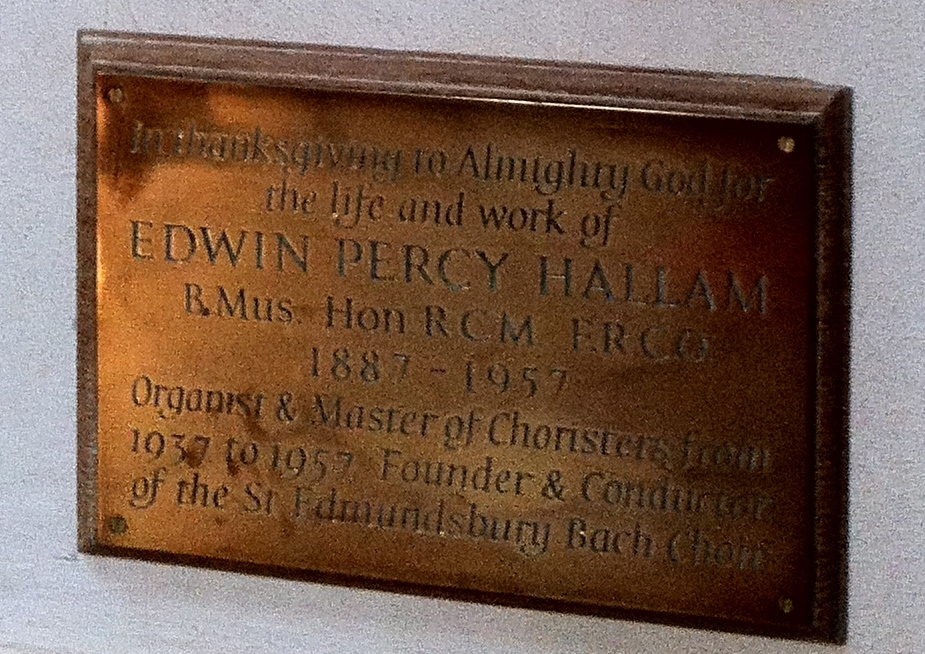
Plaque in St. Edmundsbury Cathedral to Edwin Percy Hallam

Edwin Percy Hallam (1887–1957) (Known as E.Percy Hallam) was an English cathedral organist, who served in St Edmundsbury Cathedral for twenty years from 1937 to 1957. Before serving at the Cathedral, he was organist of St Mary's Church, Bury St Edmunds for eighteen years from 1909 to 1937. He was affectionately known as 'Porky' despite being quite lean.

== Background ==
Hallam was born on 4 September 1887 in Nottingham. He studied the organ with James Kendrick Pyne at Manchester Cathedral.

He was the founder and conductor of the Bach Choir of Bury St. Edmunds.

== Career ==
Organist of:

- St. Chad's Church, Withington, Manchester 1907–1909
- St. Mary's Church, Bury St. Edmunds 1909–1937
- St Edmundsbury Cathedral 1937–1957

== Works ==
- Magnificat and Nunc Dimittis in A-flat
- Thou wilt keep him in perfect peace
- Lord's Prayer

Cultural offices
Preceded by Charles John Harold Shann	Organist and Master of the Choristers of St Edmundsbury Cathedral; 1937–1957	Succeeded by Harrison Oxley
