= St Matthew Friday Street =

Former church-site in London

Coordinates: 51°30′49″N 0°5′44″W

St. Matthew Friday Street
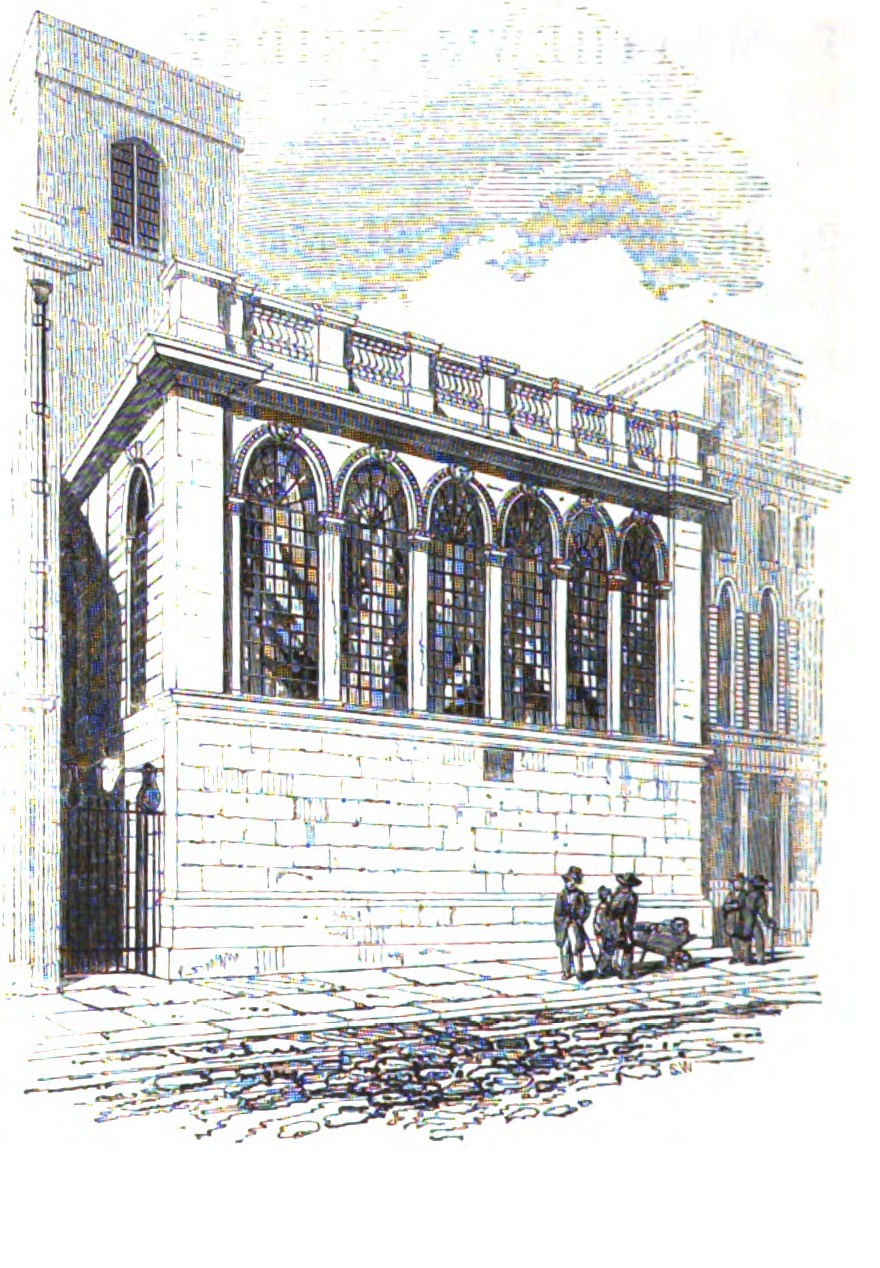
- St. Matthew Friday Street
- OS grid reference: TQ 32246 81128
- Location: Friday Street, London
- Country: England
- Denomination: Church of England

Architecture
- Architect: Christopher Wren
- Style: Baroque
- Demolished: 1885

St. Matthew Friday Street was a church in the City of London located on Friday Street, off Cheapside. Recorded since the 13th century, the church was destroyed in the Great Fire of 1666, then rebuilt by the office of Sir Christopher Wren. The rebuilt church was demolished in 1885.

== The middle ages ==
St. Matthew was the only church in the City of London dedicated to the apostle and patron saint of accountants. Friday Street was so named, according to John Stow, after the fishmongers living there, although none are recorded in the parish records. Cheapside was the principal market street of medieval London (“cheap” meaning market) and many of the lesser streets running off were called after the commodity sold there, such as Milk Street, Bread Street and Wood Street. It is more likely, therefore, that Friday Street was so called from fishmongers vending, rather than living there.

The earliest surviving reference to the church is in a document from the reign of Henry III, as “St Matthew in Fridaistret”. A document from 1381–1382 refers to the church as “St. Matthew in Chepe”.

== Seventeenth century ==
In 1631, Hugh Myddleton, the entrepreneur who had engineered the New River to supply water to London (and which still survives between Hertfordshire and Stoke Newington) was buried in St. Matthew Friday Street. He had been a parishioner and churchwarden. When the church was demolished, 254 years later, an unsuccessful attempt was made to find his monument and coffin.

During this time, the rector of St. Matthew's was the puritan divine Henry Burton. In 1636, he preached there that William Laud’s changes to church ritual were drawing the Church of England closer to popery and accused the bishops of being “caterpillars”, not pillars of the church. As a result, Burton was placed in a pillory and had his ears cut off. After Laud's fall and execution, Burton published “The Grand Impostor Unmasked, or a detection of the notorious hypocrisie and desperate impiety of the late Archbishop (so styled) of Canterbury, cunningly couched in that written copy which he read on the scaffold”.

St. Matthew's ties with the Dissenters survived the Restoration. By the Act of Uniformity 1662, the Book of Common Prayer was made compulsory in all churches. The churches minister Henry Hurst was ejected from the church. In his diary entry on the day the Act came into effect, Sunday 24 August 1662, Samuel Pepys recorded a visit to his uncle's house for dinner, and recounted:

Among other things they tell me that there hath been a disturbance in a church in Friday Street; a great many young people knotting together and crying out "Porridge" often and seditiously in the church, and took the Common Prayer Book, they say, away; and, some say, did tear it; but it is a thing which appears to me very ominous. I pray God avert it.

"Porridge” was a Puritan term for the Book of Common Prayer.

Four years’ later, St. Matthew's, along with the great majority of the churches in the City, was destroyed in the Great Fire.

== Rebuilding after the Great Fire ==
The parish was combined with that of nearby St Peter, Westcheap which was not rebuilt, its site being retained as a graveyard, which survives today as a public space off Cheapside. The Commissioners responsible for rebuilding the churches after the Fire contemplated moving St Matthew's to a more convenient location. This did not happen. Instead, the site of the church was augmented by a piece of parish land. Building commenced in 1682 and the church was complete by 1685, at a total cost of £2,309. In addition to this amount, the combined parishes paid Wren a gratuity of £3 8s.

St. Matthew Friday Street was the smallest and cheapest of the Wren churches. Its plan was an irregular rectangle; George Godwin described the interior as "a plain room of most uneven shape, about 60 feet long and 30 feet broad within the walls, with a plain flat ceiling, slightly coved at the sides. There was a gallery at the west end with a small organ. The exterior walls were of brick, except for the east front, towards Friday Street, which was faced with stone. The east wall was unadorned at street level, but had a row of five round-headed windows with cherub-headed keystones above. The tower, in the south west corner, which was not visible from the street, was the plainest of any Wren church. It was plain brick and hung one bell. Entrance to the church was via alleyways to the north and south.

St. Matthew's communion table and Royal Arms are now in St. Vedast-alias-Foster, while the font and pulpit are in St. Andrew-by-the-Wardrobe.

== Demolition ==
Due to the move of population from the City to the suburbs in the second half of the nineteenth century, the church became redundant and was demolished in 1885 under the Union of Benefices Act 1860. The parish was joined to St Vedast alias Foster, the site sold for £22,005, and the proceeds used to build St. Thomas Finsbury Park.

The reredos, by Edward Pearce, was acquired by the London decorating firm of White, Allom & Company, who suggested to Margaret Greville (the Honorable Mrs. Ronald Greville: 1863–1942), a noted society hostess, that it should be rebuilt in the hall at Polesden Lacey, her house at Great Bookham, near Dorking in Surrey – where it remains. It has a segmental pediment on two Corinthian columns, framing two round-headed panels, which originally framed the Ten Commandments

The section of Friday Street on which the church formerly stood was destroyed during the Second World War. The street was built over by the New Change Buildings in the 1950s, the site of St. Matthew's being in the courtyard. The site has since been redeveloped.

A section of Roman tiled pavement found 18 feet below the floor of St. Matthew's is now displayed in the courtyard of nearby St Vedast alias Foster.

== Organ ==
A new organ was built in 1762 by George England.

=== Organists ===
- John Young 1735–1767
- Martin Rennoldson 1767–1802
- William Boyce 1802–1812
- John Cash 1812–1815
- Thomas Grady 1815–1817
- J.C. Webb 1818–1830
- Miss Lea 1830–1835
- Mrs Andrews 1836–1878

== See also ==
- List of Christopher Wren churches in London
- List of churches rebuilt after the Great Fire but since demolished

== Publications ==
- Cobb, Gerard "The Old Churches of London" Batsford,1942
- Jeffery, Paul. "The city churches of Sir Christopher Wren", Hambledon Press, 1996
- Huelin, Gordon. "Vanished churches of the City of London", Guildhall Library Publications, 1996
