= Daniel Fitter =

English Catholic clergyman

Daniel Fitter (born in Worcestershire, England, 1628; died at St. Thomas' Priory, near Stafford, 6 Feb., 1700) was an English Catholic clergyman who was affected by but managed to navigate his way through the religious strife of the late seventeenth century.

He entered the English College, Lisbon at the age of nineteen, went through his studies with some distinction, and was raised to the priesthood in 1651. A year or two later, he returned to England, and was appointed chaplain to William Fowler, Esq., of St. Thomas' Priory, where he remained until his death. During the reign of James II of England, he opened a school at Stafford, which was suppressed during the Glorious Revolution. At the period of controversy following the Titus Oates plot (1678), he, with a few others, upheld the lawfulness of taking the oath then tendered to every well-known Catholic. He himself took the oath, and defended his action on the ground of a common and legal use of the term "spiritual". In consequence of this, when the chapter chose him as Vicar-General of the Counties of Staffordshire, Derbyshire, Cheshire and Salop, they required that he should "sign a Declaration made by our Brethren in Paris against the Oath of Supremacy".

In a letter to the clergy of England and Scotland (1684), Cardinal Philip Howard recommended warmly the "Institutum clericorum in communi viventium", founded in 1641 by the German priest Bartholomew Holzhauser, and approved by Innocent XI in 1680 and 1684. The institute met with eager acceptance in England, and Fitter was appointed its first provincial president and procurator for the Midland district. The association was, however, dissolved shortly after his death by Bishop Giffard in 1702, on account of a misunderstanding between its members and the rest of the secular clergy. Fitter had bequeathed property to "The Common Purse" of the institute, with a life-interest in favour of his elder brother Francis; but when the institute ceased to exist, Francis, by a deed of assignment, established a new trust (1703), called "The Common Fund" for the benefit of the clergy of the district. This fund became subsequently known as "The Johnson Fund" and still exists. Daniel Fitter also left a fund for the maintenance of a priest, whose duty it should be to reside in the county of Stafford and take spiritual charge of the poor Catholics of the locality.
