= Mary Gadbury =

English seller of "Laces, pins, Bandstrings, and other trifles for Gentlewomen"

- Born: c. 1610
- Died: After 1650
- Known for: disciple of alleged messiah

Mary Gadbury (born c. 1610 – died after 1650) was an English seller of "Laces, pins, Bandstrings, and other trifles for Gentlewomen" and associate of William Franklin (Pseudochristus). She claimed to be the spouse of Jesus Christ and was tried twice.

== Life ==
Gadbury is thought to have been born in about 1619. Her name at birth may have been Mary Pakeman as an 18-year-old girl of that name had married James Gadbury at St Gregory by St Paul's church in London in September 1637.

In 1649 she met William Franklin who had been a ropemaker and he was now telling people that he was the Son of God.

The two them had been asserting that William was Jesus Christ come to earth in a new body and Gadbury was claiming to be the spouse of Jesus.

She came to trial on 27 January 1650. The first trial was in Winchester when two witnesses confirmed their offences. She and William were required to sign and recant their beliefs. William signed and so did Gadbury but only after she had been whipped. While imprisoned they were interrogated by Humphrey Ellis who was a Roman Catholic minister.

The trial was repeated on 7 March 1650 in front of Lord Chief Justice Henry Rolle who was a member of the Council of State. The same happened again as William agreed to recant quickly whereas Gadbury was given "correction" to persuade her to make her mark. They were both released within weeks and never heard from again although one follower and a disgraced minister mentioned him in 1666.

In 1650 Humphrey Ellis published his account as Pseudochristus: or, A true and faithful relation of the grand impostures, horrid blaspemies, abominable practises, gross deceits; lately spread abroad and acted in the county of Southampton, by William Frankelin and Mary Gadbury ...
