= William Clifford (priest) =

English Roman Catholic theologian

William Clifford (alias Mansell) (died 30 April 1670) was an English Roman Catholic theologian.

== Life ==
After education and ordination at Douai, Clifford went on the English mission. As vice-president, he helped the English College, Lisbon through difficult times, and became superior of Tournay College (Paris), assigned by Cardinal Richelieu to the English clergy.

He evaded being made bishop in 1660, declined in 1670 the presidency of Douai, and closed his life in the Hôpital des Incurables in Paris.

== Works ==
Clifford's works are:

- "Christian Rules proposed to a vertuous Soule" (Paris, 1615), dedicated to Mrs Ursula Clifford;
- "The Spirituall Combat", translated by R.R. (Paris, 1656), dedicated to Abbot Montague;
- "Little Manual of Poore Man's Dayly Devotion" (2nd edition, Paris, 1670), often reprinted;
- "Observations upon Kings' Reigns since the Conquest" (MS.);
- "Collections concerning Chief Points of Controversy" (MS.)

== Family ==
He was the son of Henry Clifford and wife Elizabeth Thimelby. After the death of his father, Clifford's mother joined the English Augustinian nuns in Leuven. She died at aged 77 on 3 September 1642.

Clifford never asserted his right to the Barony of Cumberland.
