= English College, Lisbon =

Catholic seminary in Lisbon, Portugal

- Convento dos Inglesinhos, Lisboa
- Other names: Pontifical English College of St. Peter and St. Paul, Lisbon
- Type: Seminary
- Active: 1624–1973
- Founder: Pedro Coutinho
- Religious affiliation: Roman Catholic

The English College, Lisbon (Portuguese: Convento dos Inglesinhos) was a Roman Catholic seminary that existed from the 17th century to the 20th century.

== Early history ==
Philip III of Spain issued a royal charter for the college on 3 December 1621, with a papal brief from Gregory XV following on 29 September 1622. In 1624, Pedro Coutinho, a member of a prominent family, proceeded to found a college for English students wishing to study for the Catholic priesthood and for mission work in England and Wales. It was known as SS. Peter and Paul's (with greater formality the Pontifical English College of Sts Peter and Paul - Lisbon). It was awarded the same rights and privileges as the English College, Rome, and was one of the Pontifical Colleges in the sense of being centrally controlled from Rome, one of the substantial group of institutions set up with the aim of maintaining the Catholic faith in England, Ireland, and Scotland. In 1628, the first students arrived from the English College, Douai.

The moving force behind the foundation was the priest William Newman (1577–1640), though he never became head of the college. Newman had been entrusted with property from the estate of the late Nicholas Ashton, a Catholic chaplain in Lisbon. Initial progress was slow after a papal brief of Pope Gregory XV in 1622, with only a church erected on property given by Coutinho, who also gave endowment. Richard Smith, the Catholic bishop in England, took a hand and sent one of his archdeacons, Joseph Haynes (also Hynes, Harvey). The foundation was supported by the arrival of group of students and teachers from the English College, Douai in 1628, the first president being Haynes. Haynes, however, then died quite suddenly, shortly after the college opened in 1629.

The second president was Thomas White, alias Blacklow, with William Clifford as vice-president. He was at the college for three years from 1630. His rules for its governance brought it under the Bishop of Chalcedon (the title used at the time by the Catholic bishop in England). Pursuing further funding and students in England, he was dissatisfied at the results and resigned.

Following the French revolution and the closure of seminaries in Douai and Paris, the Lisbon college was enlarged to accommodate 40 more people.

== Later history ==
The college suffered severely from the earthquake of 1755, but continued its work. It assembled an extensive belle-lettristic library in English over the second half of the eighteenth century, including works by Shakespeare, the earliest to reach Portugal and indeed the earliest known to have circulated in the Portuguese-speaking world. The college finally closed in 1973, James Sullivan being the final president of the college. In 1974 the archives and library of the college were transferred to Ushaw College, Durham. The college had remained on the site it was originally established on, until its closure. The Lisbonian Society was set up by alumni of the college to maintain the legacy and communicate with former students.

== People associated with the College ==
- Peter Baines, president 1865-1882
- James Barnard, president 1776-1782
- Gerard Bernard, alias Woodbury, president 1756-1776
- John Ignatius Bleasdale, student
- Edward Booth, student
- James Yorke Bramston, student
- Francis Clayton (alias Whitaker), professor and president 1652-1653
- William Clifford, vice-president
- Humphrey Ellis, student in 1628
- Daniel Fitter, student
- Peter Gooden, student
- John Goter, student and president-elect
- Victor Guazzelli, student later bishop
- Thomas Hall, student
- William Hall, student
- William Hart, third President of the college, serving from 1634 to 1637
- Thomas Haydock
- Roger Hesketh
- William Hilton, born in 1825; educated at Lisbon; ordained 1850; served some time on the mission in the Diocese of Shrewsbury, England; made a domestic prelate in 1881; and returned to Lisbon as president in 1883.
- Joseph Ilsley, professor of theology and canon law, served as vice-president and president of the college 1853-1865
- Edward Jones, professor, vice-president(1699-1707) and long serving president from 1707 to 1729 and from 1732 to 1737 (his death)
- John Manley, president 1729-1732 and from 1737 to 1755 (his death)
- John Perrot (alias Barnesley), convert to Catholicism, professor, vice-president 1653–59, president 1659-1672
- Edward Pickford, student and first alumnus president
- Richard Russell, bishop in Portugal, diplomat who served as secretary to the Queen of Portugal
- John Sergeant, Cambridge-educated convert to Catholicism who served as professor in Lisbon
- Thomas Tylden (alias Godden), Oxford-educated convert to Catholicism, trained in Lisbon, served as professor, vice president and president
- Mathias Watkinson, long-serving president from 1672 to 1706
- Thomas White, second president 1630–1633
- Edmund Winstanley, president 1819 - 1852

== See also ==
- English College, Douai
- English College, Rome
- English College, Valladolid
- Royal Scots College
- Irish College at Lisbon
