= Henry Wilkinson (cricketer) =

English cricketer (1877–1967)

Personal information
- Born: 11 December 1877; Huddersfield, Yorkshire, England
- Died: 15 April 1967 (aged 89); Simonstown, Cape Province, South Africa

Henry Wilkinson(11 December 1877 – 15 April 1967) was an English first-class cricketer, who played fifty-one first-class games from 1903 to 1912. He appeared in forty-eight games for Yorkshire County Cricket Club from 1903 to 1905, and for North of England (1904), Woodbrook Club and Ground (1912) and C. B. Fry's XI (1912) in first-class games, and for the Yorkshire Second XI (1903–1906), Yorkshire Colts (1900) and Yorkshire Cricket Council (1903).

Born in Hillhouse, Huddersfield, Yorkshire, England, Wilkinson was a right-handed batsman, who scored 1,467 runs at 19.05, with the highest score of 113, his only century, against the Marylebone Cricket Club (MCC). He took 21 catches in the field. He took three wickets at 40.33, with the best of 2 for 28 against Kent.

Wilkinson died in April 1967, in Simonstown, Cape Province, South Africa.
