= Rapley =

Rapley is a surname. Notable people with the surname include:

- Chris Rapley (born 1947), British scientist and scientific administrator
- Curtis Rapley (born 1990), New Zealand rower
- Frank Rapley (born 1937), New Zealand cricketer
- Kevin Rapley (born 1977), British footballer
- Teremoana Rapley (born 1973), New Zealand singer, MC and television presenter
