= William Rushworth (priest) =

English Roman Catholic priest

- Died: 1637
- Occupation: Roman Catholic priest

William Rushworth (died 1637), or William Richworth, was an English Roman Catholic priest and controversialist.

== Biography ==
Rushworth was a native of Lincolnshire. He received his education in the English College at Douay, where he went by the name of Charles Ross. He was ordained priest on 29 September 1615, and on 8 March 1617–18 he undertook the office of general prefect, which he resigned on 18 August 1618. Soon afterwards he was sent to the mission in England, where he died in 1637. His anonymous biographer says: "He was a man curious in divinity, controversies, mathematicks, and physick, but chiefly delighted in mathematics, and, by the name of Robinson, entertained correspondence with the learned Oughtred."

Rushworth left in manuscript a work which was published under the title of "The Dialogves of William Richworth; or, the iudgmend [sic] of common sense in the choise of Religion," Paris (John Mestais), 1640 (12mo, pp. 582; reprinted, Paris, 1648, 12mo). Another edition, corrected and enlarged by the Rev. Thomas White, who added a fourth dialogue, is entitled: "Rushworth's Dialogues. Or the Judgment of common sence in the choyce of Religion," Paris, 1654, 8vo, pp. 280. William Chillingworth wrote: "An Answer to some Passages in Rushworth's Dialogues" which appeared at the end of the ninth edition of his "Works," London, 1727, fol., and Matthew Poole also replied to Rushworth in "The Nullity of the Romish Faith," 1667 and 1679. Thomas White published "An Apology for Rushworth's Dialogues. Wherein the Exceptions of the Lords Falkland and Digby are answer'd, and the Arts of their commended Daillé discovered," Paris, 1654, 8vo; and another vindication of Rushworth appeared in a work entitled "Tradidi Vobis; or the Traditionary Conveyance of Faith Cleer'd in the rational way, against the exceptions of a Learned Opponent. By J[ohn] B[elson], Esquire," London, 1662, 12mo.
