= Henry Wilkinson (1610–1675) =

English clergyman

Henry Wilkinson (1610–1675) was an English clergyman, in the Commonwealth period a canon of Christ Church, Oxford, Lady Margaret Professor of Divinity, and member of the Westminster Assembly. Later he was a nonconformist preacher.

== Life ==
He was born at Waddesdon, Buckinghamshire, on 4 March 1610 to a clerical family.

He matriculated at Magdalen Hall, Oxford, on 14 February 1623, aged 12, graduated B.A. on 25 November 1626, M.A. on 11 June 1629, and B.D. on 16 November 1638. He preached in and about Oxford; for a sermon attacking some of the ceremonies of the church, preached at St. Mary's on 6 September 1640, Wilkinson was suspended from his divinity lecture, and from all his priestly functions in the university until he should recant. He appealed to the Long parliament, and in December 1640 was restored by the committee of religion of that body, who ordered the sermon to be printed.

Subsequently, Wilkinson moved to London, was appointed minister of St. Faith's under St. Paul's, chosen a member of the Westminster Assembly, and in 1645 became rector of St. Dunstan's-in-the-East. In 1646 he was one of the six preachers despatched by the Long parliament to Oxford, where he was chosen senior fellow of Magdalen, and deputed a parliamentary visitor. On 12 April 1648 he was appointed canon of Christ Church on the expulsion of Dr. Thomas Iles. He was created D.D. on 24 July 1649, and elected Lady Margaret professor of divinity on 12 July 1652, which office he filled until 1662. In 1654 he served on the commission for ejecting scandalous ministers from Oxfordshire.

He was known in Oxford as 'Long Harry' or 'senior' to distinguish him from another Henry Wilkinson (1616–1690) known as 'Dean Harry'.

After the Restoration he was ejected from his professorship by the king's commissioners and left Oxford. Wilkinson preached first at All Hallows, Lombard Street, and afterwards at Clapham. A conventicle of sixty or more persons to whom he was preaching was broken up at Camberwell in August 1665. After the 'indulgence' he took out a licence on 2 April 1672 for his house or the schoolhouse at Clapham to be a presbyterian meeting-house. He was well known around London as a preacher.

He died on 5 June 1675, either at Deptford or Putney. His body was conducted by many hundreds of persons to Drapers' Hall, and thence to its burial in St. Dunstan's Church.

== Works ==
Some of his sermons were published in Samuel Annesley's Morning Exercise, 1661, and Supplement, 1674 (republished in 1844). He also wrote Babylons ruine, Jerusalems rising in 1643.

== Family ==
He was the son of Henry Wilkinson ("the elder") (1566–1647), by his wife Sarah Wake. His father, who was elected fellow of Merton College, Oxford, in 1586, was created B.D. on 7 July 1597, and was from 1601 till his death on 19 March 1647 rector of Waddesdon. He was chosen one of the Westminster divines in 1643; he published A Catechism (4th edit. London, 1637), and The Debt Book, or a Treatise upon Rom. xiii. 8 (London, 1625). By his wife Sarah, daughter of Arthur Wake of Salcey Forest, Northamptonshire, and sister of Sir Isaac Wake, he had six sons and three daughters.

According to Anthony à Wood Henry married 'a woman called the lady Carr,' and in his will he mentions one son and two daughters.
