= Edward Barlow (priest) =

English Roman Catholic priest and mechanician

- Born: 1639
- Died: 1719 (aged 79–80)
- Education: English College, Lisbon
- Occupations: Priest, mechanician
- Father: Edward Booth

Edward Barlow, alias Booth (1639–1719), was an English priest and mechanician.

== Life ==
Barlow was the son of Edward Booth, of Warrington, in Lancashire, where he was baptised 15 December 1639. He took the name of Barlow from his uncle, Father Ambrose Barlow, the Benedictine monk, who suffered martyrdom on account of his priestly character. At the age of twenty he entered the English College at Lisbon (1659), and after being ordained a priest he was sent on the English mission. He first resided with Lord Langdale in Yorkshire, and afterwards removed to Parkhall, in Lancashire, a seat belonging to Mr. Houghton, but his chief employment was attending the poor in the neighbourhood, "to whom he conformed himself both in dress and diet." He died in 1719 at the age of eighty.

Dodd, the church historian, who was personally acquainted with Barlow, observes that:

he was master of the Latin and Greek languages, and had a competent knowledge of the Hebrew before he went abroad, and 'tis thought the age he lived in could not show a person better qualified by nature for the mathematical sciences; tho' he read not many books of that kind, the whole system of natural causes seeming to be lodged within him from his first use of reason. He has often told me that at his first perusing of Euclid, that author was as easy to him as a newspaper. His name and fame are perpetuated for being the inventor of the pendulum watches; but according to the usual fate of most projectors, while others were great gainers by his ingenuity, Mr. Barlow had never been considered on that occasion, had not Mr. Tompion (accidentally made acquainted with the inventor's name) made him a present of 200l. [£200].

== Inventions ==
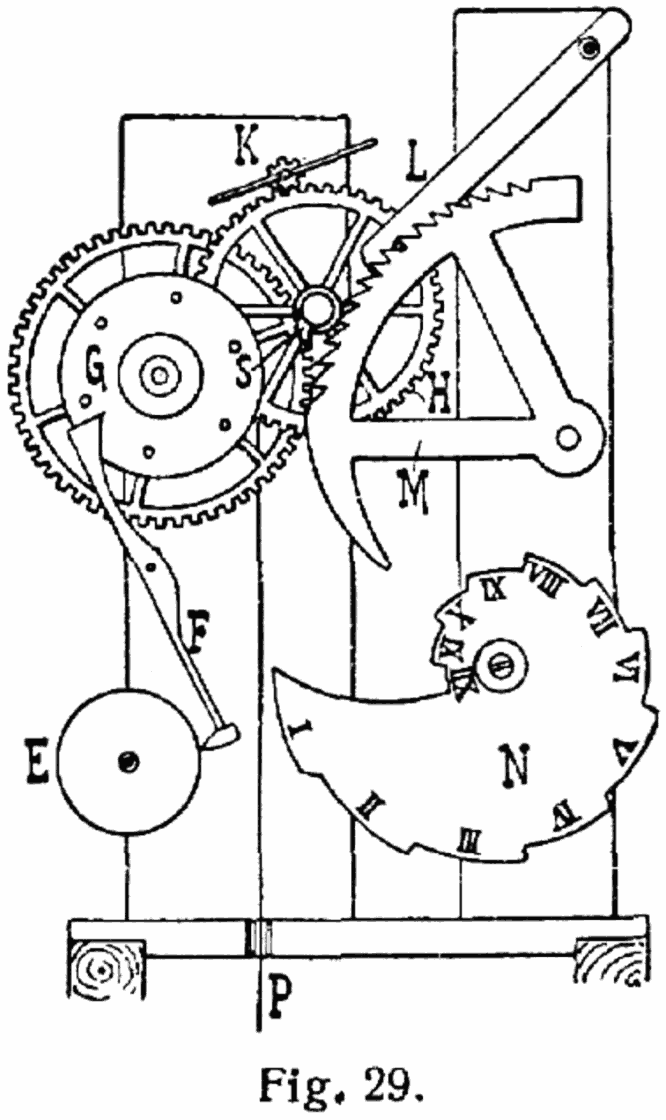
Rack striking (see text)

During the 20th century there was a common misconception that Barlow invented the rack and snail striking mechanism for striking clocks in about 1675–6. In fact, his invention was connected with a repeating mechanism employing the rack and snail allowing repeater clocks to be built which, at the pull of a string, would strike the number of hours. In this age before widespread artificial illumination, these were used to tell the time after dark.

This invention was afterwards applied to pocket watches. Barlow and London watchmaker Daniel Quare disputed the patent rights to the repeating watch. In 1687, King James II decided the question by having each watchmaker submit a quarter repeater watch for the examination of the king and his council. The king, upon trying each of them, gave preference to Quare's, of which notice was given soon after in The London Gazette. The difference between these two inventions was that Barlow's was made to repeat by pushing in two pieces on each side of the watch-box, one of which repeated the hour, the other the quarter-hour. Quare's was made to repeat by a pin that stuck out near the pendant; which being pressed repeated both the hour and quarter.

== Works ==
He was the author of:

- Meteorological Essays concerning the Origin of Springs, Generation of Rain, and Production of Wind; with an account of the Tide, London 1715, 8vo.
- An exact Survey of the Tide; explicating its production and propagation, variety and anomaly, in all parts of the world, especially near the coasts of Great Britain and Ireland; with a preliminary Treatise concerning the Origin of Springs, Generation of Rain, and Production of Wind. With twelve curious maps, London 1717, 8vo; 2nd edition, 1722.
- A Treatise of the Eucharist, 3 vols. 4to, MS.
