= Harold Arthur Faulkner Wilkinson =

Australian army officer and public servant

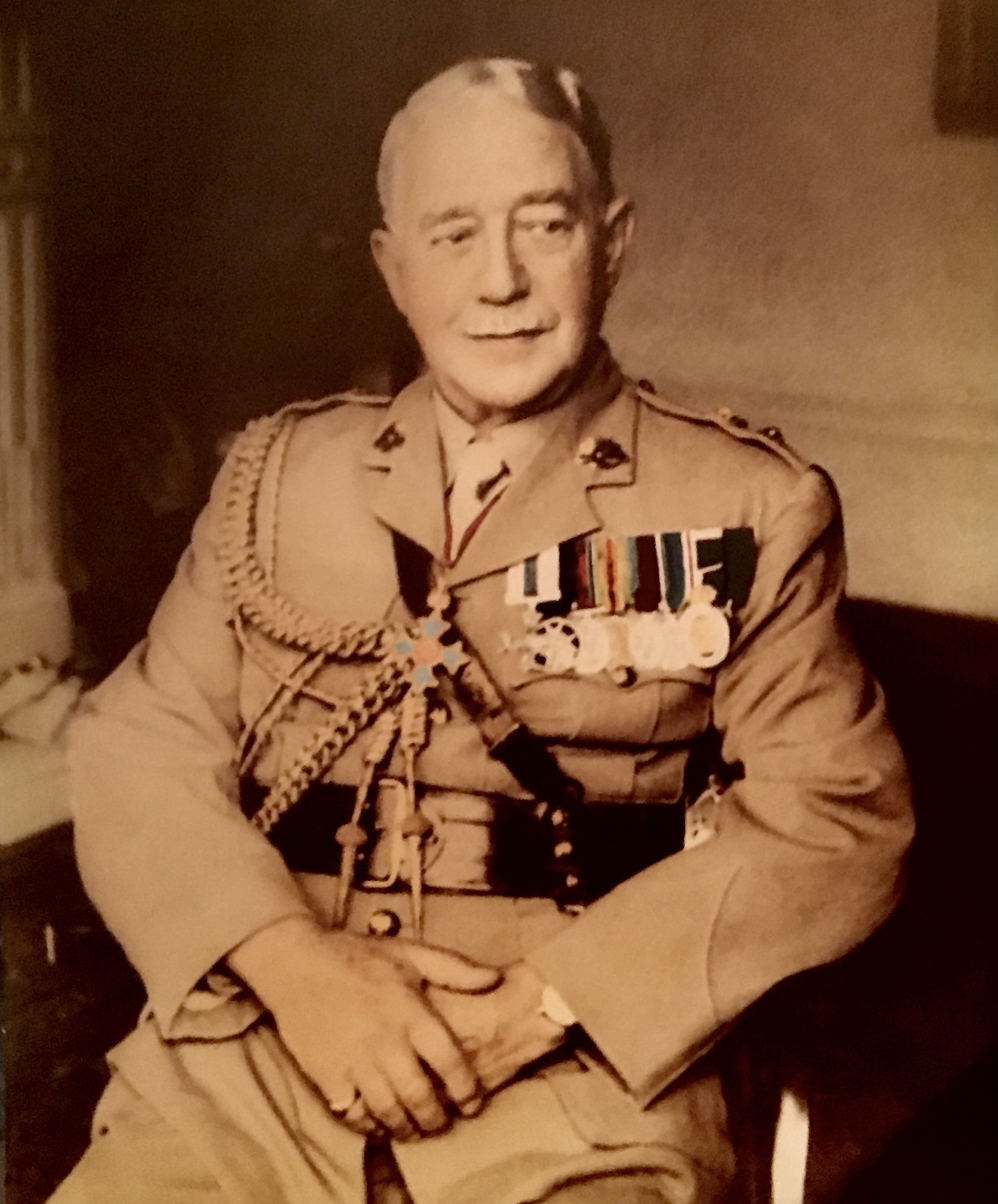
Lieutenant Colonel Harold Arthur Faulkner Wilkinson CBE MC VD circa 1949

Lieutenant Colonel Harold Arthur Faulkner Wilkinson CBE MC VD, (1879–1960) was an Australian Army officer and public servant who served as Private Secretary and Aide-de-Camp to successive Governors and Lieutenant Governors of Western Australia and Victoria.

== Early life and military service ==
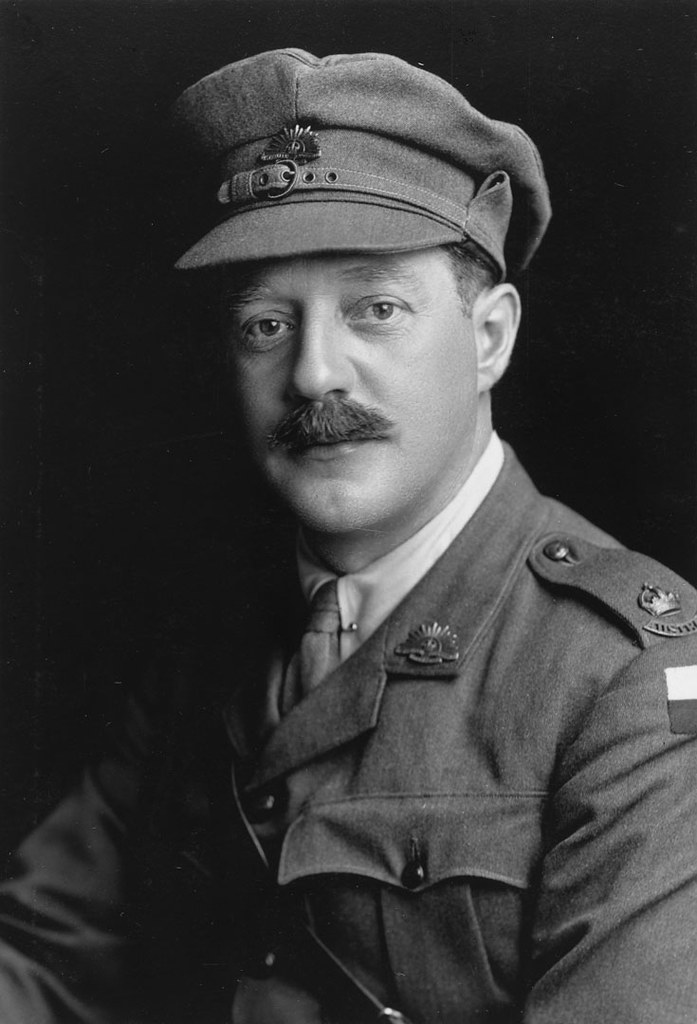
Captain (Hon Major) Harold Arthur Faulkner Wilkinson 16th Infantry Battalion Australian Imperial Force. circa 1917.

Born in 1879 in Perth, Wilkinson was the son of Captain George Faulkner Wilkinson, 68th Durham Light Infantry. He was educated at the Hale School and joined the Western Australian public service in 1896 as a junior, subsequently working his way up to the position of Inspector in the Audit Department.

Wilkinson joined the Civil Service Corps in 1900, receiving his first commission as a Lieutenant in 1901. In 1904 he was promoted Captain, and Major in 1912. In 1914 he held the appointment of Adjutant to the Western Australian Infantry Regiment for three and a half years and assumed command temporarily on two occasions. In 1909 he was sent by the Commonwealth Government to India for special training, being attached to the 1st Battalion Royal Warwickshire Regiment with local rank in the British Army, where he served with Bernard Montgomery.

Wilkinson enlisted in the Australian Imperial Force at the beginning of 1917. He arrived in France in August 1917 after training in England. He initially held the rank of Lieutenant and later appointed Captain, but was afforded the rank of Honorary Major throughout the war. Serving with the 16th Infantry Battalion at Ypres and throughout the German spring offensive, he was awarded the Military Cross during the Battle of Hamel fighting in the Vaire and Hamel Woods. He was presented his MC by George V at an investiture ceremony at Buckingham Palace on 27 March 1919. His citation read:

With great dash he led his company forward into the enemy front line system, enabling the rest of his battalion to advance without severe casualties. He then organised bombing sections up a communication sap and trench and cleared them for the advance. At one strong point he led a small party against a nest of enemy machine guns, capturing two guns, and putting the crews out of action. He did very fine service.

In August 1918 he was seconded for duty with the 3rd Infantry Training Brigade at Coxford and was appointed commander of the Brigade in 1919.

In 1939 he was appointed a lieutenant colonel and placed on the retired list.

== Public service ==
He served as ADC to Sir Edward Stone between 1906 and 1916 and to the Governor Sir Gerald Strickland from 1909 to 1912. He was Private Secretary to Strickland from 1912 and to Sir Harry Barron from 1913.

Upon returning from the war, Wilkinson served as Private Secretary to the Governor of Victoria the Earl of Stradbroke between 1922 and 1923. In 1924 he returned to Western Australia as Private Secretary to Lt Governor Sir Robert McMillan and to the Governor Sir William Campion. In 1931 he settled in Melbourne on a permanent basis serving as Private Secretary and ADC to Lt Governor Sir William Irvine. Assistant Private Secretary to the Governor Lord Huntingfield and Private Secretary to Sir Frederick Mann. From 1947 to 1949 he was Private Secretary to Lt Governor Sir Edmund Herring and Assistant Private Secretary Sir Reginald Dallas Brooks. In 1948 he was made a Commander of the British Empire.

== Personal life ==
Wilkinson married Grace Mabel Stanford Bluntish in England in 1917. They had two children, Vaire (named for the place he won his MC) and Dudley.

Dudley served with the 2nd AIF as General Thomas Blamey's driver in Palestine and was later severely wounded by a Japanese sniper in 1945 serving with the 2/6th Infantry Battalion near Aitape.

Wilkinson retired to England to live with his daughter and her family near Bath where he died in 1960.
