= Henry Hurst (theologian) =

Henry Hurst (1629–1690) was an English Nonconformist theologian and ejected minister.

== Life ==
He was born at Mickleton in Gloucestershire in 1629. He attended the Merchant Taylors' School and went on to study at Magdalen Hall, Oxford.

In 1656 he began his teaching at Aston Subedge and at the end of 1658 he became the rector of St Matthew Friday Street a now lost church in London. By the Act of Uniformity 1662, the Book of Common Prayer was made compulsory in all churches. Hurst, spent some time considering his position. He was ejected from the church.

In 1675 he was made chaplain to the Earl of Anglesey.

== Sermons ==
- Three Sermons on Rom. vii. 7, Oxford, 1659, 8vo.
- Three Sermons on the Inability of the highest, improved natural Man to attain a sufficient Knowledge of Indwelling Sin, 1660, 12mo.
- The Revival of Grace, &c., London, 1678, 8vo (dedicated to his patron, Arthur, earl of Anglesea).
- Annotations upon Ezekiel and the Twelve Lesser Prophets (in continuation of Matthew Poole's Annotations on the Holy Bible), 1688.
