= John Gother =

English convert to Catholicism, priest, controvertist and eirenicist

John Gother (died 1704), also known as John Goter, was an English convert to Catholicism, priest, controvertist and eirenicist.

== Life ==
Born at Southampton, England, Gother was educated a strict Presbyterian, but part at least of his mother's family were Catholics. Gother himself was converted to Catholicism as a boy and on 10 January 1668 entered the English College at Lisbon, a seminary for the formation of Catholic clergy.

Ordained priest in 1676, he returned to England in 1681 to work on the mission in London, where at least from 1685 he began to devote time to writing. Later, at an unknown date (possibly 1688), Gother became chaplain to the recusant family of George Holman of Warkworth, Northamptonshire, at the Castle or Manor. It was there that he instructed and received into the Catholic Church a boy called Richard Challoner, son of the housekeeper, who was later to become a Bishop and Vicar Apostolic of the London District. Challoner, one of the most impressive characters of the period of English persecution of Catholics, made his own not a few aspects of Gother's eirenicism and programme of spiritual promotion.

Gother is said to have been put forward as a possible successor to Bishop Philip Michael Ellis (OSB), Vicar Apostolic of the Western District. The latter had been appointed in 1688, but almost immediately was imprisoned by the Protestant régime resulting from the Dutch invasion and was then forced to take refuge first at Saint-Germain and afterwards in Rome, resigning the post as Vicar Apostolic in 1704.

It was in 1704 that Gother was sent to be President of the English College, Lisbon. Already ill on his departure, he died at sea, probably on October 1704, after receiving the last rites from another Catholic priest on board. Owing to the respect he had won among the captain and crew, his body was preserved and brought to Lisbon, where it was conveyed to the English College and interred in the chapel there.

== Lime Street Chapel ==
In 1686 Gother with John Betts and others founded a chapel on London's Lime Street. All Catholic places of worship in London at the time were private, attached to the court or diplomatic residences. The chapel constructed was evidently larger than the needs of a private household, and in March 1686 Robert Geffrye, the Lord Mayor, tried to have building stopped. Harris calls the development of this place of worship a "transparent sham". Geffrye was encouraged to intervene by a group including the clerics Henry Compton and William Sherlock, and the Whig politician Robert Clayton. Pedro Ronquillo Briceño, Spanish ambassador in London, commented on the atmosphere of rumour which surrounded the construction. He also noted that many believed that the founding group of priests were the main force.

The chapel was shortly given a diplomatic status, with James Stanford, Resident for Philip William, Elector Palatine, as owner: he was an English Catholic, considered to have been acting as a figurehead for a group of influential Catholics. James II backed the chapel's construction. Besides the king's support, there were contributions from Catholic merchants and priests. The Elector Palatine's views were not consulted.

The house on which the chapel was based had been leased by Betts, in 1676. It was later associated with Thomas Abney as Lord Mayor. The chapel was a separate structure, constructed possibly after Stanford (name given at the time also as Stamford or Sandford) had made a chapel in the house, and involved Catholic priests. There were hostile attentions from April 1686.

The king required Stanford to bring in Jesuit priests, in June 1686, to replace the secular priests originally employed. There was a peaceful period of two years, in which a school was established, linked to the chapel. One of the Jesuits was Alexander Keynes (1641–1712), from a Somerset recusant family of Compton Pauncefoot. The school, in Fenchurch Street, was adjacent to the house and chapel, and was one of two in James II's London run by Jesuits.

The chapel's activity came to an end in 1688. When Charles Petre SJ, brother of Edward Petre, preached there on 30 September against the King James Version, there was a riot, on which John Evelyn reported: Petre was removed from the pulpit, which was damaged, as was the altar. The chapel was protected against another attack on 29 October, by the trained bands and the watch.

== Legacy ==
On his death Gother left in manuscript form a revision of the Gospel and Epistle readings for the Mass. He felt this was necessary since the Rheims Version of 1582 was becoming dated by this time. His manuscript was used by William Crathorne (1670-1739) in a series of missals first published circa 1719, which presented readings from the Mass in parallel Latin and English columns.

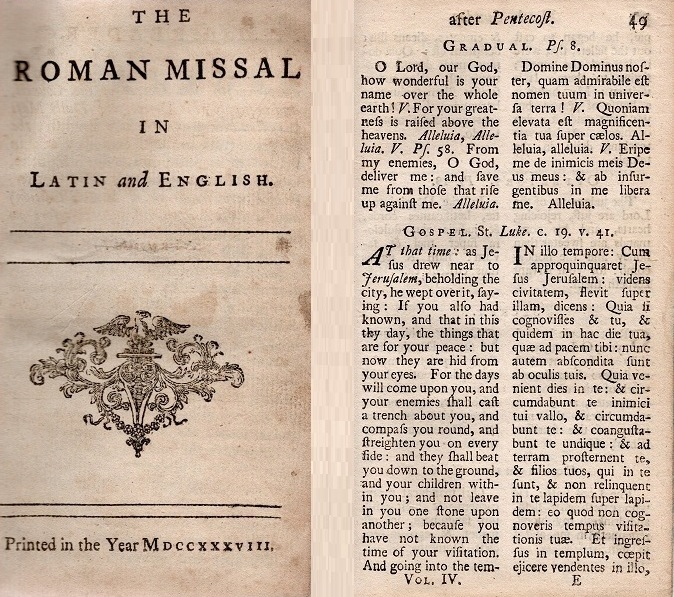
Title and sample page from an early Latin-English missal. Shown is the Gospel reading for the Ninth Sunday after Pentecost. Note in lines 5 and 6 the rendering "If you also had known." This is revised from the original Rhemes rendering, "If thou also hadst knowen."

== Works ==
The 1913 Catholic Encyclopedia describes Gother as "something of an eirenicist", presenting Catholic viewpoints and debating Protestants in the hope of making converts to Catholicism or at least improving its public image.

Gother also emphasized prayer and spiritual experience, and in later life wrote many works of a devotional character. These were popular among Catholics for well over a century.

His work, A Papist Misrepresented and Represented, lists at length commonly held errors as to Catholic doctrine and practice. All such errors are duly "refuted" in the manner of the time, but courteously and in an English style that was well regarded. Various Anglican divines made reply, including notably Edward Stillingfleet, later Anglican Bishop of Worcester, in a prolonged series of rejoinders and counter-rejoinders.

The principal among John Gother's many works, some translated into other languages, are:

- A Papist Misrepresented and Represented, or a two-fold Character of Popery (London, 1665 but often republished into the 20th century)
- Nubes Testium, or a Collection of the Primitive Fathers (London, 1686)
- The Sincere Christian's Guide in the Choice of a Religion (London, 1804)
- Instructions of the Epistles and Gospels of the Whole Year (London, 1780)
- The Sinner's Complaint to God (London, 1839)
- Principles and Rules of the Gospel (London, 1718
- A Practical Catechism
- Instructions and Devotions for Hearing Mass (London, 1767)
- Instructions for Confession, Communion and Confirmation (Dublin, 1825).

William Crathorne edited The Spiritual Works of Rev. John Gother in 1718 (16 vols.).
