= Robert Pugh (Jesuit) =

Welsh priest (1610–1679)

Robert Pugh (1610–1679) was a Welsh Jesuit priest and controversialist.

== Life ==
He was one of the several sons of Philip Pugh of Penrhyn, in the parish of Eglwys-Ross, Carnarvonshire. His elder brother, Richard, born in 1607, entered the English College at Valladolid under the alias of Bartholomew Phillips in 1626, was ordained there in 1633, entered the Society of Jesus, and died on the mission in Wales about 1645. A younger brother, John, born 1620, who also used the alias of Phillips, was ordained priest at the English College at Rome, but died in 1645 before he left the college.

Robert Pugh was educated at the College of St. Omer, under the name of Phillips. He entered the Society of Jesus, but in 1645 left it. Anthony à Wood says that he was dismissed the Society for accompanying the Royalist army of the First English Civil War as a military chaplain without the consent of his superiors. After the Royalist's defeat he studied and became doctor of civil and canon law, probably at the University of Paris.

In 1655 the pope made him protonotarius apostolicus and he became one of Queen Henrietta Maria's chaplains. At this period, and despite his dismissal from the Society of Jesus, he remained his former Order's strenuous defender. He was the most prominent opponent of Thomas White and "Blackloism", in other words appeasement of The Protectorate of Oliver Cromwell. Pugh collected letters from the Jesuit Provincial, John Warner and these were published as Blacklo’s Cabal. He also wrote against the authority claimed by the Old Chapter. He had a better Latin style than Thomas White alias Blacklow, but had less ecclesiastical learning.

After the Restoration of 1660 he resided with the William Herbert, 1st Marquess of Powis. During the religious persecution of Catholics at the time of the Popish Plot, whilst paying a visit to some of the Catholic gentry confined in Newgate Prison, he was betrayed, and himself detained a prisoner. He died of disease in Newgate on 22 January 1679, aged 69. He was interred in the burial-ground attached to Christ Church, near Newgate.

Henry Foley rather confuses him with the Scottish Oratorian, Fr. Robert Phillip.

== Works ==
- De retinenda cleri Anglicani in sedem Apostolicam observantia. Parisiis, 1659, 4to.
- Elenchus Elenchi; sive Animadversiones in Georgii Batei, Cromwelli parricida: aliquando protomedici, Elenchum motuum nuperorum in Anglia. Parisiis, 1664, 8vo.
- An anonymous writer attributed to his pen Lord Castlemaine's "Catholic Apology," 1666.
- Of the several states and governments that have been in England since 1642, MS. in Lord Castlemain's possession in Wood's time.
- Amuletum Excantationis. (?), 1670, 8vo, in rejoinder to White's "Monumetham."
- Blacklo's Cabal, discovered in several of their Letters, clearly expressing designs inhuman against Regulars, unjust against the Laity, schismatical against the Pope, cruel against orthodox Clergymen, and owning the nullity of the chapter, their opposition to Episcopal Authority. Second Edition, s.l., 1680, 4to, pp. 126, vide under Hen. Holden, vol. iii. 338, No. 14.
- A Latin ode which Wood says he had seen.
- Barthoniensium et Aquisgranensium Thermarum Comparatio, rebus adjunctis illustratis. Lond. 1676, 12mo, written by way of Epistle to his patron Lord Castlemain, dated "Bathe, 7 Kal. Aug. 1675."

== Sources ==
- Public domain text by Joseph Gillow from A literary and biographical history, or bibliographical dictionary, of the English Catholics from the breach with Rome, in 1534, to the present time (1885), online text.
