= Harry Wilkinson (footballer, born 1883) =

English footballer

Personal information
- Full name: Henry Wilkinson
- Date of birth: 1883
- Place of birth: Bury, Lancashire, England
- Date of death: Unknown
- Position: Outside forward

Senior career*
Years	Team	Apps	(Gls)
- Newton Heath Alliance
1903–1904	Manchester United	8	(0)
1904–1905	Hull City		
1905–1906	West Ham United	14	(2)
1906	Manchester United	0	(0)
- Haslingden
- St Helens Recs
1907–1908	Bury	2	(0)
- Oswaldtwistle Rovers
- Rochdale
- * Club domestic league appearances and goals

Henry "Harry" Wilkinson (born 1883) was an English footballer who played in either outside-forward position.

Born in Bury, Lancashire, Wilkinson played for Newton Heath Alliance of the Manchester League, where he won a runners-up medal. Wilkinson signed professional forms with Manchester United in December 1903 but was allowed to move to Hull City, who at that point were only competing in friendly games. When Hull joined the Second Division, United demanded £150 for his transfer, a sum the Yorkshire club were unable to afford. With West Ham United competing in the Southern League, outside of the Football League structure and not bound by their rules, they were able to sign Wilkinson for nothing.

He made his Hammers debut on 16 September 1905 in a 1–2 defeat against Luton Town at Upton Park and made 15 league appearances for the club.

He later played for Haslingden, Bury, Oswaldtwistle Rovers, and Rochdale.
