= John Sergeant (priest) =

English Roman Catholic priest, controversialist and theologian

John Sergeant (1621–1707 or 1710) was an English Catholic priest, controversialist and theologian.

== Life ==
He was a son of William Sergeant, a yeoman in Barrow-upon-Humber, Lincolnshire, and was admitted in 1639 as a sub-sizar at St John's College, Cambridge, graduating in 1643. On the recommendation of William Beale he was appointed secretary to Thomas Morton, the Anglican Bishop of Durham, time he spent on transcriptions of the Church Fathers. A year or so later, he converted to Catholicism as result of his studies.

He subsequently moved to the English College, Lisbon. He studied theology and in 1650 was ordained as a Catholic priest. He subsequently taught at the college until 1652, when he became procurator and prefect of studies. From 1653 to 1654, he worked as a priest in England before returning to Lisbon where he resumed his earlier work and taught philosophy. In 1655 he was elected canon and appointed as secretary. For the next twenty years he was actively engaged in controversy, both with Anglicans such as the bishops Edward Stillingfleet and John Tillotson, and Catholics who differed from Thomas White.

At the time of the Oates Plot he entered into communication with the Privy Council which greatly scandalized the Catholics. This arose from his opposition to Jesuit influence in the English Catholic Church. He avoided arrest by passing as a physician under the names of Dodd, Holland, and Smith. There is an original painting of him at Ushaw College, in Durham.

== Works ==
He was reportedly difficult to work with, saying and writing many things that offended even his co-religionists. He was a voluminous writer, leaving over fifty works, either published or in manuscript, some of which are listed below:

- J[ohn] S[ergeant] (1665). Sure-footing in Christianity, or Rational Discourses on the Rule of Faith. With Short Animadversions on Dr [Thomas] Pierce's Sermon; also on Some Passages in Mr [Daniel] Whitby and Mr [Edward] Stillingfleet, which Concern that Rule. London. OCLC 613962049.

His three philosophical works, written late in life, were:

- The Method to Science. London, 1696.
- Solid Philosophy Asserted, Against the Fancies of the Ideists: or, The Method to Science Farther Illustrated. With Reflexions on Mr. Locke's Essay Concerning Human Understanding. London, 1697.
- Transnatural Philosophy, or Metaphysicks: Demonstrating the Essences and Operations of all Beings whatever, which gives the Principles to all other Sciences. And shewing the perfect Conformity of Christian Faith to Right Reason, and the Unreasonableness of Atheists, Deists, Anti-trinitarians, and other Sectaries. London, 1700.
