= Thomas White (scholar) =

English Catholic priest, scholar and philosopher

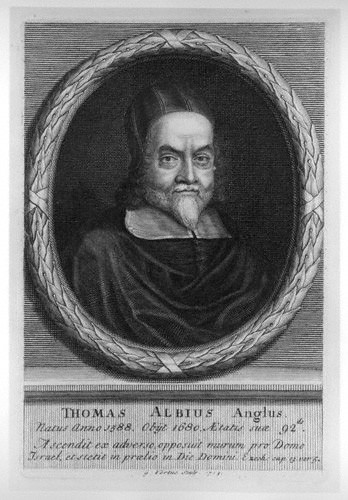
Thomas White, 1713 engraving by George Vertue.

Thomas White (1593, Runwell – 6 July 1676, London) was an English Roman Catholic priest and scholar, known as a theologian, censured by the Inquisition, and also as a philosopher contributing to scientific and political debates.

== Life ==
Thomas White was the son of Richard White of Hutton, Essex and Mary, daughter of Edmund Plowden. He was educated at St Omer College and Douai College; and subsequently at Valladolid. He taught at Douai, and was president of the English College, Lisbon. Ultimately, he settled in London.

His role in English Catholic life was caricatured by the hostile Jesuit Robert Pugh in terms of the "Blackloist Cabal", a group supposed to include also Kenelm Digby, Henry Holden, and John Sergeant. In fact the Old Chapter was controlled by a Blackloist faction, in the period 1655 to 1660.

== Works ==
He wrote around 40 theological works, around which the "Blackloist controversy" arose, taking its name from his alias Blackloe (Blacklow, Blacloe).

Thomas Hobbes wrote a refutation of White's De Mundo Dialogi Tres in 1642, which remained unpublished until 1973. The Institutionum peripateticarum (1646, English translation Peripatetical Institutions, 1656) represented itself as an exposition of the 'peripatetic philosophy' of Kenelm Digby. It was a scientific work, showing acceptance of the motion of the Earth and ideas of Galileo, but disagreeing with him on the cause of the tides.

In 1654, he produced an edition of the Dialogues of the controversialist William Rushworth (or Richworth). The Grounds of Obedience and Government (1655) was written during the Protectorate of Oliver Cromwell. Its implicit message, the Blackloist line for Catholics, was submission to the de facto ruler. The political aim was to secure an accommodation, and religious tolerance for Catholicism, and this was particularly controversial since the achievement of the objective might be at the cost of the access of Jesuits to England.

He replied to Joseph Glanvill's The Vanity of Dogmatizing (1661), an attack on Aristotelians, with Scire, sive sceptices (1663).

- De mundo dialogi tres, Parisii, 1642.
- Institutionum peripateticarum ad mentem... Kenelmi equitis Digbaei pars theorica, item Appendix theologica de origine mundi, authore Thoma Anglo ex Albiis East-Saxonum, Lugduni, 1646.
- Euclides physicus, sive De principiis naturæ Stoecheidea E Londini, 1657.
- Euclides metaphysicus, sive, de principiis sapientiae, stoecheida E Londini, 1658.
