= Edward Maynard (priest) =

Edward Maynard (1654–1740) was an English priest and antiquarian.

== Early life ==
Born at Daventry, Northamptonshire, in 1654, he was the son of William Maynard of Daventry. He was educated at Magdalen College, Oxford, and graduated B.A. on 7 July 1674, and M.A. 22 May 1677.

Maynard was a Fellow of Magdalen College, 1678–94, and bursar 1687–8.

== Role at the period of the expulsion of the Fellows ==
Henry Clerke, President of Magdalen, died on 24 March 1687. King James II issued his Declaration of Indulgence for England, in early April, and aimed to break the Anglican monopoly at Oxford with his nomination of Anthony Farmer as successor. The Fellows, however, chose John Hough on 15 April, in an election for which Maynard was the placeholder second candidate.

Maynard then withdrew from college life, moving to Coleshill, Warwickshire, seat of William Digby, 5th Baron Digby, where he had a position as Lord Digby's chaplain. He was absent for the confrontation of November 1687 between the Fellows and the king, which saw most of the Fellows expelled, and Samuel Parker imposed as president. He was expelled by the commissioners of James II in August 1688, on the plea of non-residence, by which time Parker had died and Bonaventure Gifford was president; but was then restored on 25 October in the same year. He proceeded B.D. on 3 November 1688, and D.D. 3 March 1691.

== Later life ==
After he regained his position as Fellow, Maynard continued to spend time with Lord Digby, and was mostly absent from Oxford. He was for about eight years, from 1692, preacher at Lincoln's Inn.

On 15 November 1700 Maynard was installed precentor of Lichfield Cathedral, Staffordshire, and was for 40 years canon and precentor there. From 1701 to 1706 he was rector of Passenham, Northamptonshire, and from 3 April 1696 until his death rector of Boddington in the same county. He died on 13 April 1740, aged 86, and was buried in Boddington Church.

== Works ==
Maynard published:

- The second edition (1716) of William Dugdale's History of St. Paul's Cathedral.
- Two volumes of Sermons, London, 1722–4. He revised and expanded the original addresses at Coleshill.

== Legacy ==
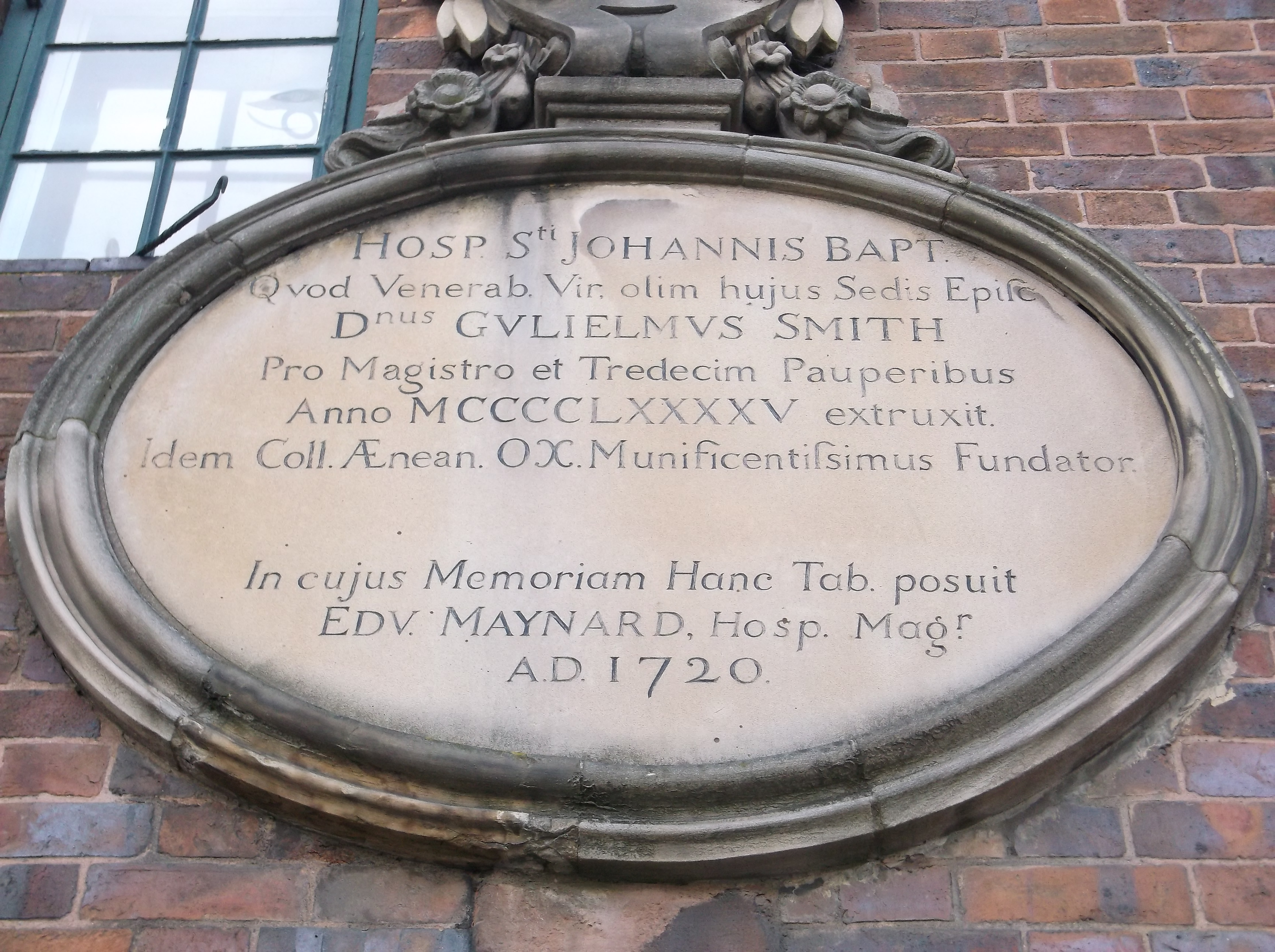
Commemorative tablet set up by Edward Maynard to honour William Smyth, at St John's Hospital Chapel, Lichfield

From 1719 Maynard was Master of Hospital of St John Baptist without the Barrs, Lichfield. He found the buildings in a ruinous state. He repaired them and left them in good condition. In 1720 he set up a tablet there to commemorate its founder, William Smyth.

Maynard contributed £697 to the construction of the New Building at Magdalen College. He made a bequest to its library, which included about 20 volumes on the religious controversy in James II's reign, the sum of £500 and a silver flagon presented to him at Lincoln's Inn in 1700. He also made charitable bequests to Daventry and Boddington and to the Society for the Propagation of the Gospel.

A gift of £200 to a charity school in Daventry contributed to Daventry Grammar School. Maynard was also a benefactor of the Coleshill lending library founded by Lord Digby in 1698, in a group including Dugdale (died 1696) and Thomas Bray.

== Family ==
Maynard married Elizabeth (died 1736), daughter of William Hastings of Hinton. He had no surviving children.
