= John Parker =

John Parker may refer to:

== In the arts ==
- John Parker (painter) (1710–1765), English painter
- John William Parker (1792–1870), English publisher and printer
- John Henry Parker (writer) (1806–1884), English writer on architecture
- John Adams Parker (1829–1905), New York painter
- John Parker (author) (born 1938), British author and journalist
- J. S. Parker (1944–2017), New Zealand painter
- John Parker (potter) (born 1947), New Zealand potter
- John L. Parker Jr. (born 1947), American runner, writer
- Jon Kimura Parker (born 1959), Canadian pianist
- John Parker (musician), British musician from the band Nizlopi

== Clergy ==
- John Parker (priest) (died 1592), English Anglican priest
- John Parker (bishop) (died 1681), Church of Ireland clergyman
- John Parker (cleric) (1798–1860), cleric, artist and author of The Passengers: containing the Celtic Annals

== Jurists ==
- John Parker (Irish judge) (c. 1500–1564), English-born merchant, politician and judge
- John Parker (English judge) (fl. 1655), member of the judiciary during the Interregnum, sat on the High Court of Justice in 1649 that tried Capel, Holland and Hamilton; father of Samuel Parker, Bishop of Oxford
- John J. Parker (1885–1958), American judge who served at the Nuremberg Trials and missed a nomination to the Supreme Court by one vote
- John Victor Parker (1928–2014), US federal judge

== Military ==
- John Parker (Jacobite) (c. 1651–in or after 1719), English army officer and Jacobite conspirator
- John Parker (captain) (1729–1775), captain of the Lexington militia at the Battle of Lexington
- John Boteler Parker (1786–1851), English army general
- John Frederick Parker (United States Navy) (1853–1911), US Navy captain and one-time governor of American Samoa, 1908–1910
- John Lankester Parker (1896–1965), British test pilot
- John Henry Parker (general) (1866–1942), (a.k.a. "Gatling Gun Parker"), U.S. Army general, officer commanding the Gatling Gun Detachment in Cuba during the Spanish–American War
- John William Robinson Parker (1857–1938), British soldier and antiquarian

== Politicians ==
=== Canada ===
- John Mason Parker (Saskatchewan politician) (1882–1960), politician in Saskatchewan
- John Havelock Parker (1929–2020), commissioner of the Canadian Northwest Territories
- John Parker (Canadian politician) (born c. 1954), former Ontario MPP and Toronto City Councillor

=== United Kingdom ===
- John Parker (died 1617) (1548–1617), MP for Truro, Hastings, Launceston and East Looe
- John Parker (died 1619) (1548–1619), MP for Queenborough
- John Parker (MP for Rochester) (fl. 1631–1680), recorder in Kent, MP for Rochester, a judge and a Baron of the Exchequer
- John Parker, 1st Baron Boringdon (1735–1788), British peer and Member of Parliament
- John Parker (MP for Clitheroe) (1754–1797)
- John Parker, 1st Earl of Morley (1772–1840), British peer and politician
- John Parker (Whig politician) (1799–1881), British politician of the Victorian era, Privy Counsellor, 1853
- John Parker (Labour politician) (1906–1987), British politician, Labour MP for Dagenham, 1945–1983
- John Parker, 6th Earl of Morley (1923–2015), British peer

=== United States ===
- John Parker (Continental Congress) (1759–1832), South Carolina delegate to the Continental Congress, 1786–1788
- John M. Parker (New York politician) (1805–1873), congressman from New York
- John Parker (Iowa politician), member of the Michigan Territory's last legislature
- John Francis Parker (1907–1992), mayor of the city of Taunton, Massachusetts
- John Parker (Montana politician) (born 1970), state representative of Montana
- John Parker (Oswego County, NY) (1810–?), New York assemblyman 1866 and 1870
- John M. Parker (1863–1939), Democratic governor of Louisiana, 1920–1924

== Sportsmen ==
=== Cricket ===
- John Parker (cricketer, born c. 1823) (c. 1823–1892), Scottish cricketer
- John Parker (West Indian cricketer) (1871–1946)
- John Parker (English cricketer) (1902–1984), played for Hampshire 1926–29 & 1932–33
- John Parker (Australian cricketer) (1936–2018)
- John Parker (New Zealand cricketer) (born 1951), New Zealand test cricketer

=== Other sports ===
- John Willie Parker (1925–1988), English former professional footballer
- John Parker (water polo) (born 1946), American water polo player
- John Parker (rower) (born 1967), American rower
- John Parker (Australian footballer) (born 1971), former Australian rules footballer
- John Parker (American football), player and coach

== In other fields ==
- John Parker (pioneer) (1758–1836), founder of Fort Parker in Texas, killed in the Fort Parker massacre
- John Palmer Parker (rancher) (1790–1868), founder of the Parker Ranch of Hawaii
- John Parker (cleric) (1798–1860), cleric, artist and author of The Passengers: containing the Celtic Annals
- John Parker (whaling master) (1800–1867), whaler
- John Parker (abolitionist) (1827–1900), African American abolitionist, inventor, and industrialist
- John Frederick Parker (1830–1890), bodyguard to Abraham Lincoln, derelict of duty the night of Assassination of Abraham Lincoln
- John Richard Parker (1834–1915), American kidnapped by Native American raiding party
- John William Robinson Parker (1857–1938), British soldier and antiquarian
- John C. Parker (1864–1927), trade unionist
- Michael Parker (courtier) (John Michael Avison Parker, 1920–2001), Duke of Edinburgh's private secretary
- Sir John Parker (businessman) (born 1942), British businessman
- John Parker (botanist), British botanist, Cambridge University

== In fiction ==
- John Parker, fictional character in Buckaroo Banzai

== See also ==
- Johnny Parker (disambiguation)
- Jack Parker (disambiguation)
- Jackie Parker (1932–2006), American football player
