= Edmund Bateman =

English cleric and academic

Edmund Bateman (1704–1751) was an English cleric and academic, the Archdeacon of Lewes from 1737 until 1751.

== Life ==
He was the son of Thomas Bateman of St. Martin's-in-the-Fields, London, and his wife Mary Symmons, born in Scotland Yard on 9 August 1704. He was educated at St. Martin's school and Eton College. His father was assistant surveyor to Sir Christopher Wren working on St Paul's Cathedral, by 1701, replaced by John James in 1715; and died in 1719.

Bateman matriculated at Christ Church, Oxford in 1720 at age 16, graduating B.A. in 1723, and M.A. in 1726. He was ordained deacon in 1726, and priest in 1727. He was a tutor at Christ Church. At that period Samuel Johnson was a student at Pembroke College, Oxford. Having determined that Bateman had a high reputation for his teaching in the university, he recommended to his school friend John Taylor of Ashbourne that he should not apply to Pembroke College, but to Christ Church; and Taylor matriculated there in 1729. Johnson himself attended lectures by Bateman.

In 1731 Bateman became chaplain to William Wake, the Archbishop of Canterbury; and Wake presented him to the London living St Dunstan-in-the-East. In 1732, chaplain to John Potter then Bishop of Oxford, he was presented also to Chevening in Kent; and the following year to Hollingbourne as a sinecure; and through his father-in-law held a prebend in Lichfield Cathedral. In early 1737, Potter having become Archbishop of Canterbury, he took degrees of B.D. and D.D. at Oxford, and was made Archdeacon of Lewes.

From 1740 Bateman was also chancellor of Lichfield Cathedral. In the same year, he was appointed Master of Hospital of St John Baptist without the Barrs, as successor to Edward Maynard. Both these preferments he again owed to his father-in-law.

Bateman died on 28 April 1751, and was buried at Lichfield in the hospital chapel.

== Works ==
Batemen published four sermons in the period 1738 to 1743. There was a "Spital Sermon" in 1738 on 1 John 4:7. One in 1740, to the Sons of the Clergy on 2 Kings 4:1–4:2 , mentioned favourably Queen Anne's Bounty, against which the Walpole ministry had moved in 1736 with its Mortmain Bill intended to prevent charitable bequests. Hudson comments that Bateman "was evidently a Tory, though politically moderate and learned".

In 1741 Bateman preached to the trustees of the Province of Georgia. At this time there was internal criticism in the new colony, founded in the 1730s, from a group called the Malcontents. The annual sermons to the Georgia trustees by this time had political content, and Bateman directed support to them in an address on Deuteronomy 33:18–33:19 (p. 11 of published text): "We do not say Gold or a Diamond is useless, because the Ore is rough, the Stone at first not greatly glistring".

== Family ==
Bateman married Mary Smalbroke (died 1791), third daughter of Richard Smalbroke, who from 1731 was Bishop of Lichfield. They had a daughter, Mary.

Church of England titles
Preceded by James Williamson	Archdeacon of Lewes; 1737–1751	Succeeded by John Courtail
