= Thomas Smith (scholar) =

English scholar

Thomas Smith (3 Jun 1638 – 11 May 1710) was an English scholar, expelled Fellow of Magdalen College, Oxford, and non-juring divine.

== Early life and academic career ==
He was the son of John Smith, a London merchant, and was born in the parish of Allhallows, Barking, on 3 June 1638. He was admitted batler (poor scholar) of The Queen's College, Oxford, on 7 August 1657, and matriculated as servitor on 29 October following, graduating B.A. on 15 March 1651, and M.A. on 13 October 1653. In that year he was appointed master of Magdalen school, in succession to Timothy Parker. He was elected probationer-fellow of Magdalen College in 1666 (when he resigned the schoolmastership), actual fellow in 1667, and dean in 1674, the year in which he graduated B.D. Elected vice-president of Magdalen in 1682, he proceeded D.D. in 1683, and became bursar of the college in 1686. he was elected a fellow of the Royal Society in December 1677.

== Voyage to the Levant ==
In 1668, Smith served as chaplain to Sir Daniel Harvey, ambassador at Constantinople. He returned to Oxford after three years, bringing with him a number of Greek manuscripts. He then devoted several years to the expression of his opinions and observations on the affairs of the Levant, and especially on the state of the Greek Orthodox Church; he gained the name at Oxford of 'Rabbi' Smith or 'Tograi' Smith. In common with Sir Paul Rycaut, he projected a rapprochement with the eastern church.

== 1680s ==
He held for about two years (1678–1679) the post of chaplain to Sir Joseph Williamson. He returned to Magdalen on his election as vice-president in 1683. He was in 1684, presented to the rectory of Standlake, but soon resigned. When Henry Clerke died on 24 March 1687, Smith tried through Bishop Samuel Parker to become his successor as Magdalen's President. James II, however, had other intentions. In August 1688 Smith was deprived of his fellowship by Bonaventure Giffard, President after Parker had died in the office. He was restored in October 1688, but he detested the revolution that ensued bringing William III and Mary II to the throne, and, losing touch with the other Fellows, he left Oxford finally for London on 1 August 1689. His fellowship was declared void on 26 July 1692, after he had repeatedly refused to subscribe the oaths to William and Mary.

== Later life ==
He settled in the household of Sir John Cotton, the grandson of Sir Robert Cotton, founder of the Cotton library. For twelve years at least, he seems to have had the principal charge of the Cottonian manuscripts. He was consulted on the formation of libraries, in particular by Narcissus Marsh. At this period he knew Samuel Pepys, and corresponded with Humphrey Wanley in Oxford.

== Death and legacy ==
Smith appears to have moved from the Cottons' at Westminster before his death, which took place on 11 May 1710 in Dean Street, Soho, in the house of his friend Hilkiah Bedford. He was buried on the night of Saturday, 13 May, in St. Anne's Church, Soho. He left Thomas Hearne a large collection of books and papers. On Hearne's death, in 1735, manuscripts, book, notes and papers came to the Bodleian Library; with the rest following in 1755.

=== Works ===
- Smith, Thomas, Vitæ quorundam Eruditissimorum et Illustrium Virorum, (1707) (Latin), The lives of certain illustrious and erudite men.
- Septem Asiae Ecclesiarum et Constantinopoleos Notitia, Utrecht, 1694
