= Jonathan Parker =

Jonathan Parker may refer to:

- Jonathan Parker (judge)
- Jonathan Parker (politician)
- Jonathan Parker (chess player)

== See also ==
- John Parker (disambiguation)
