= Samuel Parker (bishop of Oxford) =

English churchman

The Right Reverend Samuel Parker
- Bishop of Oxford
- Diocese: Diocese of Oxford
- Installed: 1686
- Term ended: 1688
- Predecessor: John Fell
- Successor: Timothy Hall
- Other post: President of Magdalen College, Oxford (1687–1688)

Orders
- Consecration: 17 October 1686 by William Sancroft

Personal details
- Born: 1640 Northampton, Northamptonshire
- Died: 21 March 1688 Magdalen College, Oxford
- Denomination: Anglican
- Parents: John Parker; Elizabeth Parker
- Spouse: Mary Parker
- Children: Richard Parker; Samuel Parker
- Education: Wadham College, Oxford (BA); Trinity College, Oxford (MA)

Samuel Parker (1640 – 21 March 1688) was an English churchman, of strong Erastian views and a fierce opponent of Dissenters. His political position is often compared with that of Thomas Hobbes, but there are also clear differences; he was also called in his time a Latitudinarian, but this is not something on which modern scholars are agreed. During the reign of King James II he served as Bishop of Oxford, and was considered by James to be a moderate in his attitude to Catholics.

== Early life and career ==
He was born at Northampton, England in 1640, the second son of John Parker the judge and Baron of the Exchequer. After studying at Northampton Grammar School, he entered Wadham College, Oxford, 30 September 1656, and matriculated at the Michaelmas term 1657. At Wadham he lived an intense presbyterian life, and graduated BA 28 February 1659. After the Restoration, his views met the disapproval of the warden of Wadham, Walter Blandford, and he migrated to Trinity College, where he proceeded MA 9 July 1663. Under the influence of Ralph Bathurst, senior fellow of Trinity, he moderated his views, and in the following year he was ordained.

Parker became rector of Chartham, Kent, in 1667, and in 1670 he became Archdeacon of Canterbury. Two years after he was appointed rector of Ickham, Kent. In 1673 he was elected master of the Eastbridge Hospital, Canterbury.

He was elected a Fellow of the Royal Society in June 1666.

== Against the Platonists ==
In 1665 he published an essay entitled Tentamina physico-theologica de Deo, dedicated to Archbishop Gilbert Sheldon, who in 1667 appointed him one of his chaplains. In 1666-7 Parker published two pamphlets targeting the Cambridge Platonists. He had just become a Fellow of the Royal Society, and these works were designed to put distance between the experimentalists of the Society and the speculations of metaphysics. In fact the Free and Impartial Censure took wide aim at hermetic thinkers in general, such as Rosicrucians, Thomas Vaughan and John Heydon. It also had as a byproduct of the critique of Platonism acute things to say about the assumption that innate knowledge was necessarily correct.

== A Discourse of Ecclesiastical Politie ==
His Discourse of Ecclesiastical Politie (1670) advocated state regulation of religious affairs, and is his major work. It has been called "the most ferocious of the Restoration assaults upon the dissenters". The aim of the book was, 'by representing the palpable inconsistency of fanatique tempers and principles with the welfare and security of government, to awaken Authority to beware of its worst and most dangerous enemies, and to force them to that modesty and obedience by severity of Laws to which all the strength of Reason in the world can never persuade them.' Hobbes's doctrine of sovereignty is fully accepted (p. 27), and the absolute supremacy of the civil power is unhesitatingly asserted. Religion, it is asserted, is so far from being at liberty from the authority of the civil power that 'nothing in the world will be found to require more of its care and influence' (p. 15). Other points of Leviathan, however, are sharply criticised. The position of dissenters is declared to be untenable and ridiculous, and the author discourses with much spirit upon 'the Pretense of a Tender and Unsatisfied Conscience; the Absurdity of Pleading it in opposition to the commands of Publick Authority.'

This book was answered at once in a pamphlet Insolence and Impudence Triumphant, and by John Owen in Truth and Innocence vindicated. Parker replied to Owen. John Locke wrote comments on the Discourse, but they remained unpublished.

It also led him into polemical controversy with Andrew Marvell (1621–1678) who illegally published the two parts of The Rehearsal Transpros'd (London, 1672, 1673) as a response to several of Parker's pamphlets, including Discourse &c. Parker further defended his position. In the controversy, Marvell succeeded in humiliating Parker to such an extent that he did not return to ecclesiastical controversy until after Marvell's death.

== Against Hobbes ==
Although Parker was thought to be close to the arguments on Hobbes on state power (and this opinion is still current), he went to lengths to attack Hobbes on the grounds of atheism, a common charge brought up against him. In A Demonstration of the Divine Authority of the Law of Nature (1681) Parker developed earlier work, and also adapted arguments from the De legibus naturae (1672) of Richard Cumberland. He contradicts Hobbes on human nature as selfish, and argues that our understanding of natural law develops from our understanding of nature, without the requirement that it be innate.

== Bishop of Oxford, President of Magdalen ==
King James II appointed Parker to the bishopric of Oxford in 1686, and he in turn forwarded the king's policy, especially by defending the royal right to appoint Roman Catholics to office. In 1687 the Ecclesiastical Commission forcibly installed Parker as president of Magdalen College, Oxford, the fellows having refused to elect any of the king's nominees. This became one of the most celebrated episodes leading up to James's abdication.

In detail, Parker was early aware of the king's intention to use the appointments to office in the universities for the furtherance of Catholicism. When, after the death of Henry Clerke, President of Magdalen, Thomas Smith called upon him to canvass support, he replied that 'the king expected that the person he recommended should be favourable to his religion.' Six months later, after the failure of his attempt to force Anthony Farmer upon the fellows, the king nominated Parker himself as President of Magdalen College (14 August 1687). Parker was ill, perhaps dying, and desired to be admitted by proxy; but the fellows refused to elect him, having already elected John Hough. The King's visit to Oxford did not advance matters, and finally the ecclesiastical commission visited the college and, after inquiry, installed Parker as president by the king's mandate, and, forcibly entering the lodgings, placed him in possession (25 October).

On 2 November he came into residence, and during the next four months admitted Catholic Fellows and demies, including several Jesuits, on successive mandates from the king. He made futile endeavours to induce the members of the foundation to recognise him as president, and expelled refractory demies. It was rumoured that Parker had proposed in council that one college at Oxford should be given to Catholics. But the king's mandate ordered him to admit nine more Catholics as Fellows. Parker's patience was exhausted, and a burst of anger coincided with a worsened condition. He died on 21 March 1688.

== Views ==
According to Jon Parkin,

For Parker, natural law required nonconformists to submit to the legal requirements imposed by the sovereign for the common good. Parker's illiberal use of the natural law argument soon attracted accusations that he was following the arguments of Thomas Hobbes.

Parker was commonly regarded as a Roman Catholic, because of his actions at Magdalen. Those were consistent with an extreme exponent of the High Church doctrine of passive obedience. To Catholic priests sent to persuade him on his deathbed to be received into the Roman Church, the bishop declared that he "never had been and never would be of that religion," and he died in the communion of the Church of England.

== Family ==
He died in Magdalen College, Oxford in 1688 and was buried in the chapel there. His second son, also named Samuel Parker (1681–1730), was a writer.

== Works ==
- Tentamina Physico-Theologica de Deo. London: 1665.
- An Account of the Nature and Extent of the Divine Dominion & Goodnesse. Oxford: 1666.
- A Free and Impartial Censure of the Platonick Philosophie. Oxford: 1666.
- A Discourse of Ecclesiastical Politie. London: 1670.
- A Defence and Continuation of the Ecclesiastical Politie. London: 1671.
- A Discourse in Vindication of Bishop Bramhall and the Clergy of the Church of England. London: 1673.
- A Reproof to the Rehearsal Transprosed. London: 1673.
- Disputationes de Deo et Providentia Divina. London: 1678.
- A Demonstration of the Divine Authority of the Law of Nature and of the Christian Religion in Two Parts. London: 1681.
- The Case of the Church of England. London: 1681.
- An Account of the Government of the Christian Church for the First Six Hundred Years. London: 1683.
- Religion and Loyalty. London: 1684.
- Religion and Loyalty, the Second Part. London: 1685.
- Reasons for Abrogating the Test Imposed upon All Members of Parliament. London: 1688.
- A Discourse Sent to the Late King James. London: 1690.
- History of His Own Times. London: 1727.

== Notes ==
Academic offices
Preceded by John Hough	President of Magdalen College, Oxford; 1687–1688	Succeeded by Bonaventure Giffard
Church of England titles
Preceded by John Fell	Bishop of Oxford; 1686–1688	Succeeded by Timothy Hall
