= Richard Challoner =

Roman Catholic priest and writer (1691–1781)

The Right Reverend Richard Challoner
- Vicar Apostolic of the London District
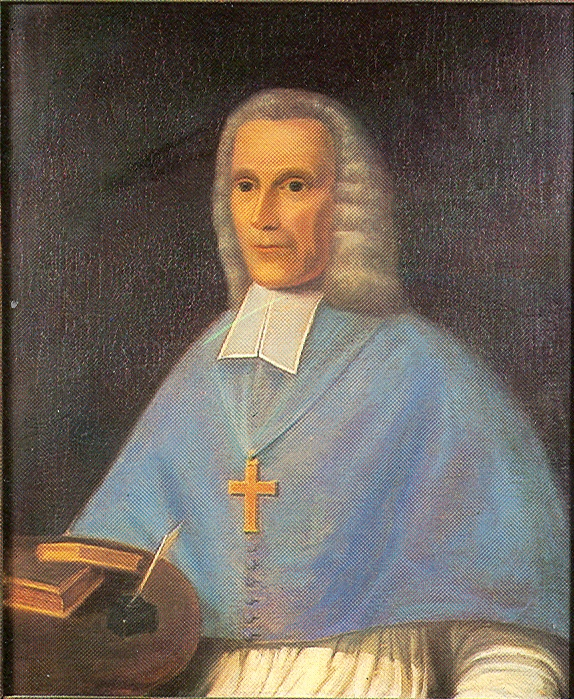
- Appointed: 12 September 1739 (co-adjutor)
- Installed: 22 September 1758
- Term ended: 12 January 1781
- Predecessor: Benjamin Petre
- Successor: James Robert Talbot
- Other post: Titular Bishop of Doberus

Orders
- Ordination: 28 March 1716
- Consecration: 29 January 1741 by Benjamin Petre

Personal details
- Born: 29 September 1691 Lewes, England
- Died: 12 January 1781 (aged 89) Gloucester Street, off Queen Square, London, England
- Buried: (1) Milton, Berkshire (2) Westminster Cathedral
- Denomination: Roman Catholic

Richard Challoner (29 September 1691 – 12 January 1781) was an English Catholic prelate who served as Vicar Apostolic of the London District during the greater part of the 18th century, and as Titular Bishop of Doberus. In 1738, he published a revision of the Douay–Rheims Bible.

== Early life ==
Richard Challoner was born in Lewes, Sussex, on 29 September 1691. His father, also Richard Challoner, was married by licence granted on 17 January, either 1690 or 1691, to Grace (née Willard) at Ringmer, Sussex, on 10 February. After the death of his father, who was a Presbyterian winecooper (wine-barrel maker), his mother, now reduced to poverty, became housekeeper to the Catholic Gage family, at Firle, Sussex. It is not known for sure whether she was originally a Roman Catholic, or whether she subsequently became one under the influence of a Catholic household and surroundings.

In any case, thus it came about that Richard was brought up as a Catholic, although he was not baptized a Roman Catholic until he was about thirteen years old. This was at Warkworth, Northamptonshire, seat of a recusant Roman Catholic family, that of George Holman, whose wife, Lady Anastasia Holman, was a daughter of Blessed William Howard, 1st Viscount Stafford, a Catholic unjustly condemned and beheaded in the Popish Plot hysteria of 1678.

== Education and academic career in France ==
In 1705 young Richard was sent to the English College at Douai (France) on a sort of scholarship, entering the English College on 29 July. He was to spend the next twenty-five years there, first as student, then as professor, and as vice-president of the university of Douai. At the age of twenty-one he was chosen to teach the classes of rhetoric and poetry, which were the two senior classes in the humanities.

Challoner graduated with a bachelor's degree in divinity from the University of Douai in 1719, and was appointed professor of philosophy, a post which he held for eight years. At this period, though it was no longer necessary to have aliases, he was known by his mother's surname of Willard. His nickname was "Book". Ordained a priest at Tournai on 28 March 1716, in 1720 he was chosen by the president, Robert Witham, to be his vice-president, an office which involved the supervision of both professors and students. At the same time he was appointed professor of theology and prefect of studies, so that he had the direction of the whole course of studies. Though in 1727 he defended his public thesis and obtained a doctorate in divinity, Challoner's success as a teacher was probably due rather to his untiring industry and devotion to this work than to any extraordinary mental gifts. He was not considered an original thinker, but his gift lay in enforcing the spiritual reality of the doctrines he was expounding. Challoner has been described as being gentle, cheerful, generous to the poor, and able to instill confidence in others.

== Return to England ==
Having in 1708 taken the college oath, binding himself to return to England, when required, to labour on the mission, in 1730 Challoner was given permission to embark for England on August 18, and was stationed in London. There he entered into the work of the ministry. Though the penal laws were no longer enforced with extreme severity, the life of many Catholic priests was still a difficult one, especially in London. Disguised as a layman in London, Challoner ministered to his flock there, celebrating Mass secretly in obscure ale-houses, cockpits, and wherever small gatherings could assemble without exciting remark. In this regard, he was an untiring worker, and spent much time in the poorest quarters of the town and in the prisons.

Recent scholarship notes, however, that the English Catholic community was not as marginalized as might be thought today, especially for those recusant Catholics whose social position gave them access to the courtly centres of power and patronage. Challoner avoided the houses of the rich, preferred to live and work among the poor of London, and in his spare hours gave himself to study and writing, which ultimately enabled him to produce several works of instruction and controversy.

His first published work, a little book of meditations under the quaint title of Think Well On't dated from 1728. The controversial treatises which he published in rapid succession from London attracted much attention, particularly his Catholic Christian Instructed (1737), which was prefaced by a witty reply to Conyers Middleton's Letter from Rome, showing an Exact Conformity between Popery and Paganism. Challoner was the author over the years of numerous controversial and devotional works, which have been frequently reprinted and translated into various languages. In 1740 he brought out a new prayer book for the laity, the Garden of the Soul, which until the mid 20th century remained a favourite work of devotion, though the many editions that have since appeared have been so altered that little of the original work remains.

Of his historical works, the most valuable is one which was intended to be a Roman Catholic response to the Protestant John Foxe's well-known martyrology, Foxe's Book of Martyrs. It is entitled Memoirs of Missionary Priests and other Catholicks of both Sexes who suffered Death or Imprisonment in England on account of their Religion, from the year 1577 till the end of the reign of Charles II (2 vols. 1741, frequently reprinted). This work, compiled from original records, was for a long while the only published source on the list of Catholic martyrs of the English Reformation, including the Forty Martyrs of England and Wales, among others. It remains a standard work on the subject.

In 1745 he produced anonymously his longest and most learned book, Britannia Sancta, containing the lives of the British, English, Scottish, and Irish saints, an interesting work of hagiography which was later superseded by that of Alban Butler and then by more recent publications. In 1738 the president of Douai College, Robert Witham, died, and efforts were made by the superiors of the college to have Challoner appointed as his successor. But Bishop Benjamin Petre, the Vicar Apostolic of the London District, who already had Challoner as his vicar general, opposed this on the ground that he desired to have him as his own coadjutor with right of succession. The Sacred Congregation of Propaganda Fide had apparently already arranged Challoner's appointment as President of Douai, but Petre's representations prevailed, and papal briefs were issued on 12 September 1739, appointing Challoner to the see of Debra in partibus.

These briefs, however, were not carried into effect, for the bishop-elect, endeavouring to escape the responsibility of the episcopate, raised the point that he had been born and brought up a Protestant. The delay so caused lasted a whole year, and it was not until 24 November 1740 that new briefs were issued. The consecration took place on 29 January 1741 in the private chapel at Hammersmith, London. The new bishop's first work was a visitation of the district, the first methodical visitation of which there is any record since the creation of the vicariate in 1688. The district included ten counties, besides the Channel Islands and the British possessions in America—chiefly Maryland and Pennsylvania and some West Indian islands. The missions beyond the seas could not be visited at all, and even the home counties took nearly three years. His flock included the old, noble Catholic families in the countryside and recently arrived indigent Irish workers. As an administrator he provided for his people a suitable prayer and meditation book, as well as convenient editions of the scriptures, the Imitation of Christ, and the catechism of Christian doctrine.

Beyond this literary work, he caused two schools for boys to be opened, one at Standon Lordship, later represented by St Edmund's College, Ware, and the other at Sedgley Park, in Staffordshire. Finance was a serious problem, but there were legal ones as well, as Catholics were forbidden to buy land or to run schools; so various subterfuges had to be used to get round the law. He also founded a school for poor girls at Brook Green, Hammersmith, besides assisting the already existing convent school there. He instituted conferences among the London clergy, and he was instrumental in founding the "Benevolent Society for the Relief of the Aged and Infirm Poor". His private life was marked by scrupulous mortification, while large charity passed through his hands.

== Revision of English Bible ==
Challoner devoted much energy and time to revising the English Catholic Bible. He had long perceived a need to update the language of the Douay–Rheims Bible that had appeared over the years 1582–1610. Challoner did not set out to make a new translation; his aim was to remove antiquated words and expressions so that the Bible would be more readable and understandable by ordinary folk. While still at the University of Douai, he had been one of the approving prelates for a revision of the Rheims New Testament published in 1730 by the college president, Robert Witham. After returning to England, he and Francis Blyth had published in 1738 another revision of Rheims in an attractive large folio edition.

Challoner's more important work would appear over the years 1749–1752. An edition of the New Testament appeared in 1749, and another, together with the first edition of the Old Testament, in 1750. Between the two editions of the New Testament there are few differences, but the next edition, published in 1752, had important changes both in text and notes, the variations numbering over two thousand. All revisions attributed to Challoner were published anonymously. It is unclear to what extent he was personally involved in, or even approved of, the various changes.

Challoner is believed to have had the assistance of Robert Pinkard (alias Typper), the London agent for Douay College, in preparing the 1749 and 1750 revisions. The chief points to note in these revisions are the elimination of the obscure and literal translations from the Latin in which the original version abounds, the alteration of obsolete terms and spelling, a closer approximation in some respects to the Anglican Authorised Version (for instance, the substitution of "the Lord" for "our Lord"), and finally the printing of the verses separately.

== Other works ==
In 1753 Challoner brought out another of his best-known works, the Meditations for every Day of the Year, a book which has passed through numerous editions and been translated into French and Italian. Challoner’s goal was to make the classics of Catholic Spirituality accessible to Catholics, in English. To this end he translated De Imitatione Christi in 1737 (entitled "The Following of Christ"), a translation of Augustine’s Confessions in 1739, and in 1757 The Life of the Holy Mother, St. Teresa, a biography of Teresa of Avila drawn from her writings.

As one of the Protestant criticisms of Roman Catholics was that many of the practices of the Catholic Church were departures from the practice of the early Church, he sought to demonstrate continuity of Catholicism with the primitive Church. Britannia Sancta was published in 1745. With this book Challoner hoped to promote among Catholics a pride in their ancestry, and to show them that their present sufferings were not as hard as those endured by the martyrs and saints of the past.

Besides the works mentioned above, and a good number of tracts, other writings, whose titles convey the atmosphere of an era, include:

- Think Well On't, or, Reflections on the great truths of the Christian Religion : for every day in the month : and The thirty days' prayer (1801)
- Grounds of Catholic Doctrine (1732);
- Unerring Authority of the Catholic Church (1732); Short History of the Protestant Religion (1733);
- A Roman Catholick's Reasons why He cannot Conform (1734); The Touchstone of the New Religion (1734);
- The Young Gentleman Instructed in the Grounds of the Christian Religion (1735);
- A Specimen of the Spirit of the Dissenting Teachers (1736); The Catholic Christian Instructed (1737);
- The Ground of the Old Religion (1742);
- A Letter to a Friend concerning the Infallibility of the Church (1743);
- A Papist Misrepresented and Represented, abridged from Gother; Remarks on Two Letters against Popery (1751);
- Instructions for the Jubilee (1751);
- The Wonders of God in the Wilderness: Lives of the Fathers of the Desert (1755);
- The Life of St Teresa, abridged from Woodhead (1757);
- Manual of Prayers (1758);
- A Caveat against the Methodists (1760);
- The City of God of the New Testament (1760);
- The Morality of the Bible (1762);
- Devotion of Catholics to the Blessed Virgin (1764);
- Rules of Life for a Christian (1766),
- The Lord's prayer and the Angelic salutation (1781).

== Later career ==
In 1753 Pope Benedict XIV put an end to the long disputes that had been carried on between the secular clergy and the regular clergy, in the last stages of which Challoner took a leading part. There were several points at issue, but the matter was brought to a head over the contention put forward by the regulars, that they did not need the approbation of the vicars apostolic to hear confessions. The bishops opposed this and, after a struggle lasting for several years, obtained a final settlement of this and other questions, a settlement, in the main, satisfactory to the bishops.

In 1758 Bishop Petre died, and Challoner, as his coadjutor, succeeded him at once as Vicar Apostolic of the London District. He was, however, nearly seventy years old, and was so ill that he was forced immediately to apply for a coadjutor in his turn. The Holy See appointed James Talbot to this office, and with the help of the younger prelate, whose assistance considerably reduced his labour, Challoner's health somewhat recovered. From this time, however, he lived almost entirely in London, the visitations being carried out by Talbot. Challoner continued to write, and almost every year published a new book, but they were more usually translations or abstracts, such as The Historical Part of the Old and New Testament. One more work of original value remained, and that was his little British Martyrology published in 1761.

== Final years ==
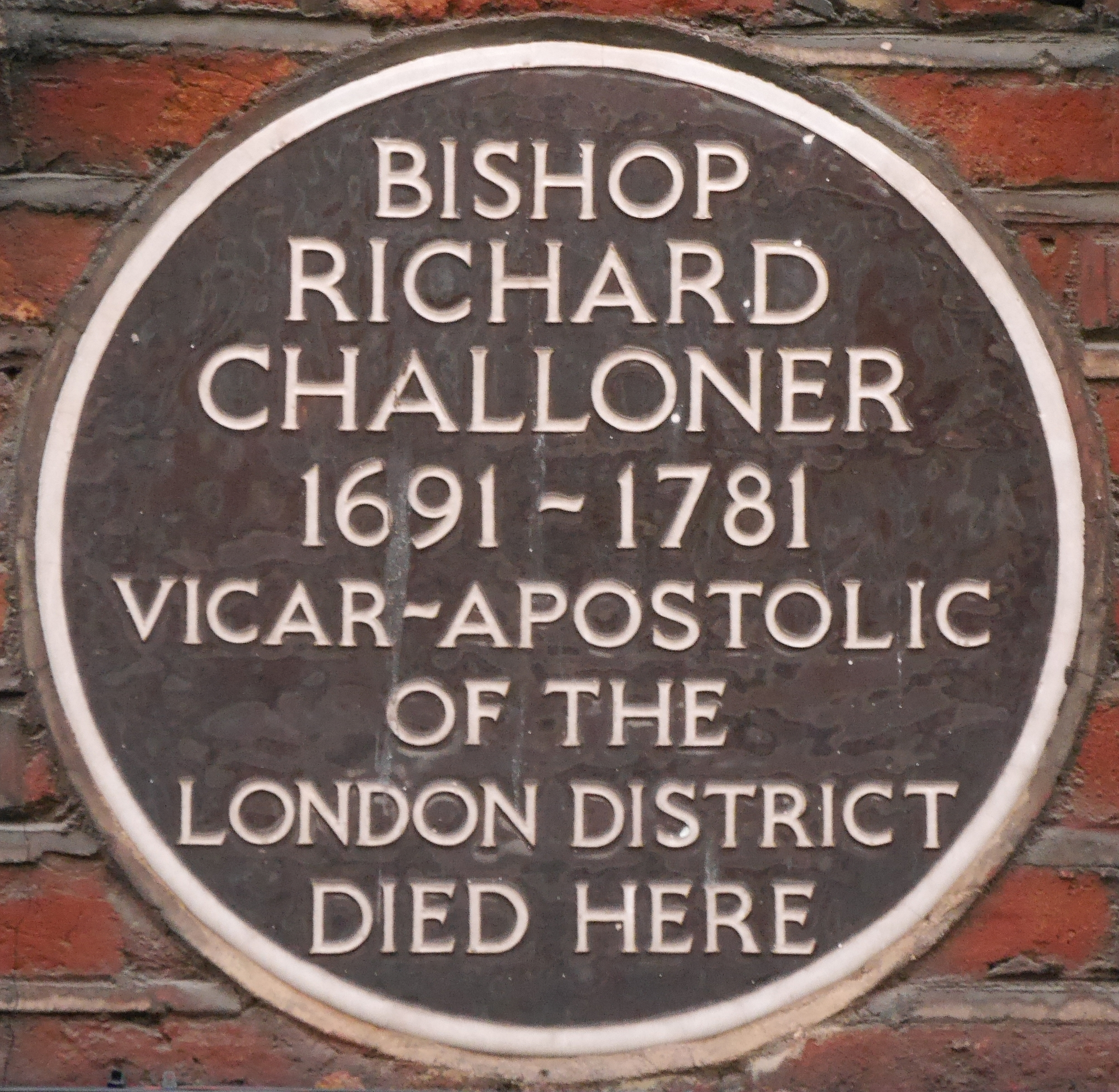
Plaque at 44 Old Gloucester Street, London

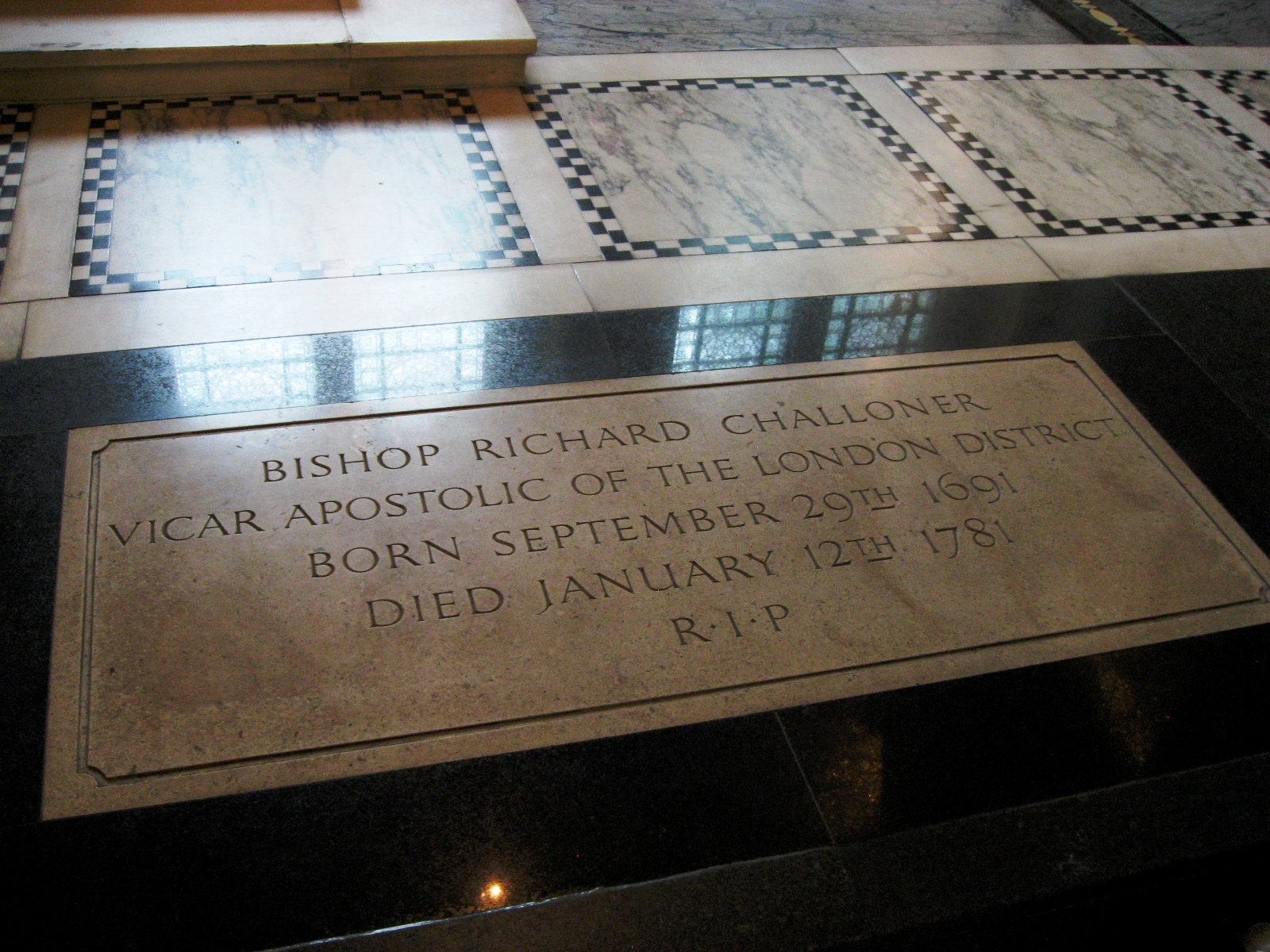
Tomb of Bishop Richard Challoner in Westminster Cathedral

As a bishop, Challoner usually resided in London, though on occasion, as during the "No Popery" riots of 1780, he was obliged to retire into the country. Challoner's extensive activity is the more remarkable because his life was spent in hiding, owing to the state of the law, and often he had hurriedly to change his lodgings to escape the Protestant informers, who were anxious to earn the government reward of £100 for the conviction of a priest. One of these, John Payne, known as the "Protestant Carpenter", indicted Challoner, but was compelled to drop the proceedings when some documents he had forged fell into the hands of the bishop's lawyers.

For some years Challoner and the London Catholic priests were continually harassed in this way. Finally the harassment was remedied by the Catholic Relief Act 1778, by which priests were no longer liable to imprisonment for life. This concession speedily aroused religious dispute, and two years later the Gordon Riots broke out with rioters attacking any London building that was associated with Catholicism or owned by Catholics. From his hiding-place the bishop, now nearly ninety years of age, could hear the mob, who were searching for him with the intention of dragging him through the streets. They failed to find his refuge, and on the following day he escaped to Finchley, where he remained till the London riots came to an end.

The aged Challoner never fully recovered from the shock of the riots. Six months later he was seized with paralysis, and died on 12 January 1781, aged 89. He was buried at Milton, Berkshire (present-day Oxfordshire) in the family vault of his friend Bryant Barrett in the Church of England parish church. In 1946 the body was reinterred in Westminster Cathedral.

== Legacy ==
There are a number of schools named after Challoner; Bishop Challoner Catholic College in Kings Heath, Birmingham, in Shortlands near Bromley, at Basingstoke and Richard Challoner School in New Malden Kingston, among others. In addition, the oldest post-Reformation Catholic school in England, St Edmund's College, Ware, a former seminary, in Hertfordshire (which Challoner himself helped to re-establish from Douay, France to its present site), named one of their five houses after him. The colour associated with the house is Royal Blue. The house is one of the original houses in the school when the house system was established in 1922.

The Bishop Challoner Catholic Collegiate School in Stepney was founded by the Sisters of Mercy for him.

Challoner Choir of Westminster Cathedral is named after him.

The Challoner Club, founded originally in 1949 and refounded in 2025, is named after him.

== Sources ==
=== References ===
- Anstruther, Godfrey (1977). Seminary Priests, 1716–1800, Vol. IV. OP.: Great Wakering: Mayhew McCrimmon, pp. 59–61
- Aveling, J. C. H. (1976). The Handle and the Axe: The Catholic Recusants in England from Reformation to Emancipation. London: Blond & Briggs ISBN 978-0-85634-047-5
- Bossy, John (1975). The English Catholic Community 1570–1850. London: Darton, Longman & Todd ISBN 978-0-19-519847-8
- Burton, Edwin H. (1909). The Life and Times of Bishop Challoner, Vol. II. New York: Longmans, Green & Co.
- Duffy, Eamon (1981). "Richard Challoner 1691–1781: A Memoir." In: Eamon Duffy (ed.), Challoner and his Church: A Catholic Bishop in Georgian England. London: Darton, Longman & Todd, pp. 1–26, ISBN 978-0-232-51527-5 (along with the other essays of the volume)
- Gillow, Joseph (1999). Bibliographical Dictionary of the English Catholics, Vol. I, pp. 452–458, Ganesha Publishing facsimile edition ISBN 978-1-85506-824-7 (for a complete list of Challoner's writings)
- Newman, John Henry Cardinal (1859). "The Text of the Rheims and Douay Version of Holy Scripture," The Rambler, Vol. I, pp. 145–169.
- Ward, Bernard (1909). The Dawn of the Catholic Revival in England, Vol. II. London: Longmans, Green & Co.

Catholic Church titles
Preceded by Benjamin Petre	Vicar Apostolic of the London District; 1758–1781	Succeeded by James Talbot
