= Francis Blyth =

British friar

Francis Blyth (1705–1772) was a Carmelite friar whose religious name was Simon Stock of the Blessed Trinity.

== Life ==
Both of Blyth's parents were Protestant and he was raised in their faith. Francis was a convert from the Anglican Protestants and so would have been familiar with the King James Bible. However, as a young man Blyth converted to Catholicism and soon joined the Discalced Carmelites in Modena, Italy. Here he changed his name to Simon Stock.

He was released from his tenure at the Discalced Carmelites due to poor eyesight and was then sent to Malta to study for the priesthood. He was eventually ordained there.

Blyth returned to England in 1730, working in Wiltshire and then in London. Whilst in England he used the pseudonym Francis Courtney. During this time he also revised the Douay Bible with Bishop Challoner.

In 1740, he was appointed assistance chaplain at the Portuguese Embassy in London. In 1756 he was promoted to chaplain-major at the Portuguese Embassy in London, a position he retained until his death on 11 December 1772. He was buried in the churchyard of Old St. Pancras in London.

== Bibliography ==
- Blyth, Francis (1740). A Caution Against Prejudice.
