= Samuel Parker (writer) =

English writer and nonjuror

Samuel Parker (1681–1730) was an English writer and nonjuror.

== Ancestors ==
Parker was the younger son of the English theologian and clergyman Samuel Parker (1640–1688), who served as Bishop of Oxford and President of Magdalen College during the tumultuous reign of James II.

== Early years ==
After early schooling in Kent, Parker attended Trinity College, Oxford, but left after several years, c. 1700, without taking a degree, evidently because he was unwilling to take the oath of allegiance, which was required of all who stood for degrees.

== Political and religious views ==
Parker joined in the nonjuring schism and worshiped separately until 1711. He was, however, persuaded by his friend Henry Dodwell's argument, in The Case in View, that the schism would end with the death of the last invalidly deprived bishop who continued to insist on his right, and he therefore returned to his parish church—St Peter in the East, Oxford—after the death of William Lloyd (bishop of Norwich). However, Parker persisted in his Jacobitism. Although he attended services at St. Peter in the East, he thought the prayers for the ruling monarch sinful, and signalized his objections to these prayers by standing up or making various gestures when they were recited. Parker refused to take orders in the Church of England or accept any position that would have required him to take the oaths of allegiance and abjuration, and he taught his sons his nonjuring and Jacobite principles.

== Employment ==
As a nonjuror, Parker could not take any position in the government, the church, or the university. To make a living, he ran a boarding house for foreign scholars visiting Oxford. He also ran an academy where sons of Jacobite squires and nonjuring clerics were educated. Students who attended it included the nonjurors Thomas Deacon and Thomas Wagstaffe the Younger.

There are many references to Parker, his academy, and his boarding house in Thomas Hearne's diaries.

== Publications ==
Parker was an accomplished writer and translator. He published a verse translation of Homer's battle of the frogs and the mice (Homer in a Nutshell, 1699) and two translations of Cicero (Tully's Five Books De Finibus, 1702; Cicero's Cato Major, etc, 1704). He also translated several of the orations of Athanasius and produced an abridged translation of Eusebius, which was eventually bundled with other translations and abridgments of early church fathers.

He was responsible from 1708 to 1710 for a monthly periodical entitled Censura temporum, or Good and Ill Tendencies of Books,. This was a book review in dialogue form which upheld orthodoxy and the Church of England against the anti-trinitarian religious ideas of William Whiston and the political notions of John Locke.

Parker published two volumes of essays:Six Philosophical Essays (1700) and Sylva (1701). These include early critiques of the religious and political ideas of John Locke. Among other things, Parker argues for the immateriality and hence immortality of the soul.

Parker's chef d'ouvre was Bibliotheca Biblica (collected in 5 vols., 1720–1735), a massive compilation of patristic commentary on the Bible, issued in monthly installments beginning in 1717 and funded via subscription. Parker hoped to cover all of the books of the Bible. However, at the time of his death only the first five volumes, covering the Pentateuch, had been completed. The fifth and final volume was published posthumously, in 1735, with a life of Parker appended.

== Family and descendants ==
Parker married Mary Clements, daughter of the Oxford bookseller Henry Clements. He had at least five sons, as well as several daughters. His eldest son, Samuel, after serving an apprenticeship in London, became a yeoman bedel at Oxford. His second son, Sackville, was a well-known Oxford bookseller who kept a shop in the High Street at the corner of Logic Lane and was a friend of Samuel Johnson. His third son, Richard, attended Lincoln College, Oxford, on a scholarship, but left without a degree on account of the oaths and later helped his father prepare the Bibliotheca Biblica. Other descendants founded the well-known Parker's bookselling establishment in the Turl, Oxford.
