= Timothy Hall (bishop) =

English bishop of Oxford (c. 1637-1690)

Timothy Hall (c.1637 – 10 April 1690) was bishop of Oxford in the reign of James II of England.

== Life ==
The son of a woodturner and householder of St Katherine by the Tower, a precinct of St Botolph Aldgate, he was probably born in 1637. He was admitted as a student of Pembroke College, Oxford, in 1654, then under presbyterian influence, where he took a B.A. Afterwards he obtained the livings of Norwood and Southam, from which he was ejected in 1662.

In 1667, having complied and signed the articles (11 January), he was presented to the small living of Horsendon, Buckinghamshire. He became perpetual curate of Princes Risborough in 1669, and vicar of Bledlow in 1674. He gave these up in 1677 for the city living of Allhallows Staining. He is said by Thomas Babington Macaulay in The History of England from the Accession of James the Second to have acted as broker for Louise de Kérouaille, Duchess of Portsmouth in the sale of pardons.

Under James II he published the royal declaration for liberty of conscience (1687), and on the death of Bishop Samuel Parker he was nominated (18 August 1688) to the see of Oxford. Although he had been duly consecrated at Lambeth on 7 October, he was refused installation by the canons of Christ Church, Oxford and consequent admission to the temporalities, while the university refused to create him doctor of divinity, though he had a mandamus.

After the Glorious Revolution, he at first refused to take the oaths to the new king and queen, but yielded at the last moment and retained his title till his death. His death is recorded in the registers of St. John, Hackney; he died on 9 April and was buried 13 April 1690.

== Notes ==
Church of England titles
Preceded by Samuel Parker	Bishop of Oxford; 1688–1690	Succeeded by John Hough
