= Benjamin Petre =

English Catholic prelate (1672–1758)

The Right Reverend Benjamin Petre
- Vicar Apostolic of the London District
- Appointed: 23 June 1721 (Coadjutor)
- Installed: 12 March 1734
- Term ended: 22 December 1758
- Predecessor: Bonaventure Giffard
- Successor: Richard Challoner
- Other post: Titular Bishop of Prusa

Orders
- Consecration: 11 Nov 1721 by Bonaventure Giffard

Personal details
- Born: August 10, 1672
- Died: 22 December 1758 (aged 86)
- Denomination: Roman Catholic

Benjamin Petre (10 August 1672 – 22 December 1758) was an English Catholic prelate who served as Vicar Apostolic of the London District from 1734 until his death.

== Life ==
He was born the son of John Petre (1617–1690) of Fidlers or Fithlers, Essex (who was a younger brother of William Petre the translator), by his second wife, Elizabeth, daughter of John Pincheon of Writtle. He was educated at the English College, Douai, and, after being admitted to the priesthood, became tutor to Lord Derwentwater, who was subsequently beheaded for treason.

He was consecrated titular bishop of Prusa on 11 November 1721, and appointed coadjutor bishop with right of succession Bonaventure Giffard, at that time vicar apostolic of the London district. Although the penal laws were no longer enforced with extreme rigor, the life of many Catholic priests was still a difficult one, especially in London. On Gifford's death on 12 March 1734, he succeeded to the vicariate. In 1739, Petre asked for Richard Challoner as coadjutor; and Challoner was duly consecrated in January 1741.

Petre believed that as vicar apostolic of the London District, he had jurisdiction over all of British America. However, responsibility had been "de facto" held by the English Province of the Society of Jesus. When the Curia discovered there had been no formal designation, it forwarded the documents to Petre, in January 1757.

Petre resided chiefly at Fidlers. He was buried in St Edmund's College, Ware. He was succeeded by Challoner.

== Sources ==
- This article incorporates text from a publication now in the public domain: "Petre, Benjamin". Dictionary of National Biography. London: Smith, Elder & Co. 1885–1900.

Catholic Church titles
Preceded by Bonaventure Giffard	Vicar Apostolic of the London District; 1734–1758	Succeeded by Richard Challoner
