= Jack Parker =

Jack Parker may refer to:

- Jack Parker (ice hockey) (born 1945), ice hockey coach and former player
- Jack Parker (cinematographer) (1885–?), British film technician
- Jack Parker (speedway rider) (1907–1990), British
- Jack Parker (footballer, born 1911) (1911–2003), Australian footballer for North Melbourne
- Jack Parker (cricketer) (1913–1983), British
- Jack Parker (decathlete) (1915–1964), American decathlete
- Jack Parker (hurdler) (1927–2022), British hurdler
- Jack Parker (runner), Northern Irish runner
- Jack Parker (footballer, born 1931) (1931–2003), Australian footballer for Collingwood
- Jack Parker (boxer) (1915–1993), New Zealand boxer
- Jack Parker (musician) (born c. 1970s), American musician in David Crowder Band
- Jack Parker, a fictional character in the BBC series Parents of the Band
- Jack Parker, a fictional character on the Australian soap opera Neighbours

== See also ==
- John Parker (disambiguation)
