= Johnny Parker =

Johnny Parker may refer to:

- Johnny Parker (jazz pianist) (1929–2010), British jazz pianist
- Johnny Parker (rugby league), Australian rugby player
- Johnny Parker (strength and conditioning coach)
- Johnny Parker (born Jonathan Parker, 1922–2013), composer, instrumentalist, singer and songwriter, bandmate of Hugo Winterhalter and His Orchestra

== See also ==
- John Parker (disambiguation)
