= John Parker (English judge) =

English judge

John Parker (fl. 1655) was an English judge during the Interregnum.

== Biography ==
Parker came from Weston Underwood, Buckinghamshire, and was admitted a student of Gray's Inn in 1611. He was called to the bar on 26 June 1617, and became successively an ancient of his inn in 1638, a bencher in 1640, and reader in 1642. (Note: At his admittance to Gray's Inn he was onerously record as coming from Weylond Underwood, however he still had property at his death in Weston Underwood and he bore arms which were first granted to the Parkers of Fryth Hall, Essex.)

On 20 March 1647 he was appointed a Welsh judge, and in the following year (12 May) received the commons' commission to try rioters in Wales. He seems to have found favour with Parliament, which made him a serjeant on 30 October 1648 and confirmed him in his Welsh judgeship on 5 March 1649. On 18 July of the same year he was granted a patent for a registrarship in the prerogative court. He was one of the assistant committee men in Northamptonshire. In 1649 he sat on the High Court of Justice that tried Lord Capel, Earl of Holland, Duke of Hamilton and found them guilty of treason for taking up arms against Parliament in the Second English Civil War. He remained in Northamptonshire as a prominent member of the parliamentary commissions of the county. On 22 June 1655 was sworn serjeant-at-law, "being a member of one of the Temples". Records in Northamptonshire show that he was dead by June 1658.

== Works ==
Whether this Parker or his namesake John Parker (MP for Rochester) issued in 1650 a book entitled Government of the People of England, precedent and present remains unknown.

== Family ==
Parker's eldest son, Dr. Samuel Parker, was a bishop of Oxford.
