= John Parker (American football) =

American football player and coach

Biographical details
- Education: Missouri Valley

Coaching career (HC unless noted)
- 1996–1997: Minnesota–Morris
- 1998–2001: Cheyney (PA)
- 2004–2005: Cumberland (TN)
- 2007: Tennessee State (assistant)
- 2013: Missouri Monsters

Head coaching record
- Overall: 10–72 (college)

John Parker is an American former football player and coach. He served as the head football coach at the University of Minnesota–Morris (1996–1997), Cheyney University of Pennsylvania (1998–2001), and Cumberland University in Lebanon, Tennessee (2004–2005). Parker was also the head coach for the Missouri Monsters of the Ultimate Indoor Football League (UIFL) in 2013.

Since retiring from coaching, he has opened up his own public relations firm.

== Head coaching record ==
=== College ===
Year	Team	Overall	Conference	Standing	Bowl/playoffs
Minnesota–Morris Cougars (Northern Sun Intercollegiate Conference) (1996–1997)
1996	Minnesota–Morris	1–9	0–6	7th	
1997	Minnesota–Morris	3–7	1–5	T–6th	
Minnesota–Morris:		4–16	1–11		
Cheyney Wolves (Ohio Valley Conference) (1998–2001)
1998	Cheyney	1–10	1–5	6th (East)	
1999	Cheyney	1–10	0–6	7th (East)	
2000	Cheyney	2–8	0–6	7th (East)	
2001	Cheyney	0–10	0–6	7th (East)	
Cheyney:		4–38	1–27		
Cumberland Bulldogs (Mid-South Conference) (2004–2005)
2004	Cumberland	0–10	0–10	11th	
2005	Cumberland	2–8	0–5	6th (West)	
Cumberland:		2–18	0–15		
Total:		10–72			
