= Hospital of St John Baptist without the Barrs =

Building with adjacent chapel in Staffordshire, England

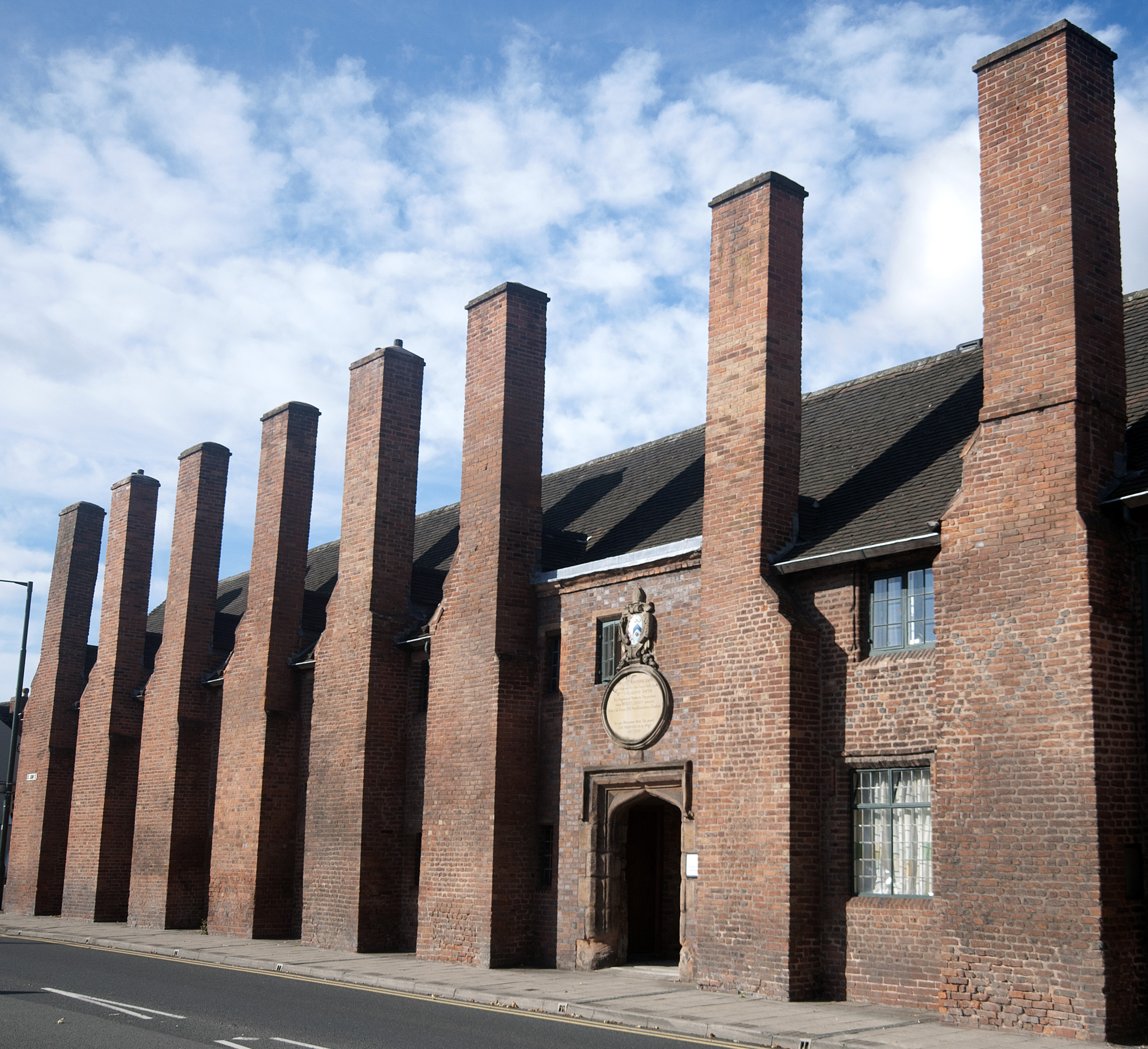
- St Johns as it would have been viewed from the gates
- Interactive map of the Hospital of St John Baptist without the Barrs area

General information
- Type: Almshouse; Chapel
- Location: St John Street, Lichfield, Staffordshire, England
- Coordinates: 52.6801°N 1.8274°W

Design and construction
- Designations: Grade I listed

The Hospital of St John Baptist without the Barrs is a building with an adjacent chapel in the city of Lichfield, Staffordshire, England. It is a Grade I listed building.

The building has ancient roots, once providing accommodation to travellers outside the southern city walls who would arrive in Lichfield after the gates had closed for the night. The distinctive eight chimneys fronting St John's Street date back to the Tudor period when the hospital served as an almshouse for elderly gentlemen in the city.

== History ==
=== 1129–1495 ===
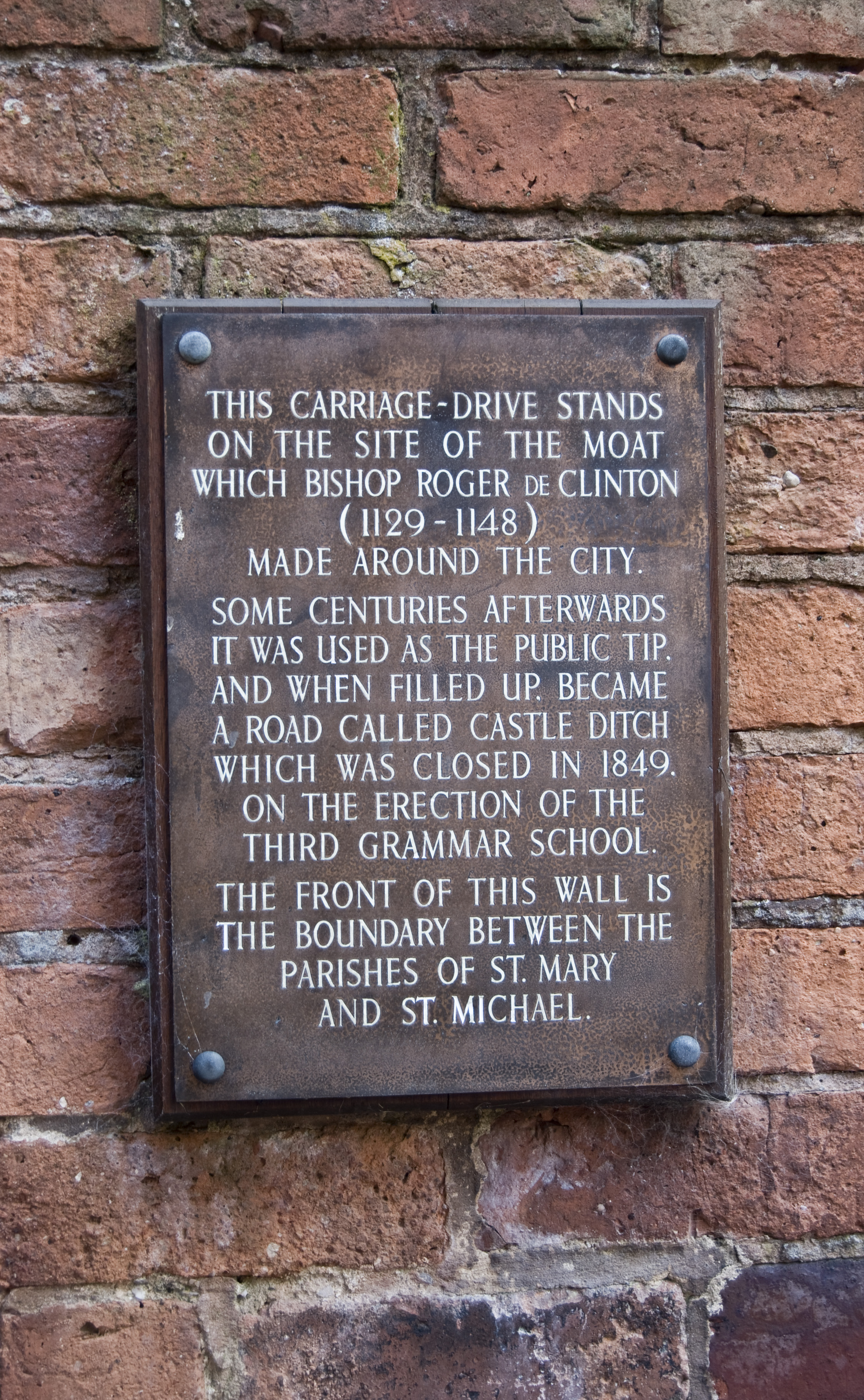
Plaque indicating the site of the city walls

In 1129, Roger de Clinton was appointed Bishop of Lichfield. He built a new cathedral fortified the Cathedral Close and laid out a new town. Finally he constructed a defensive ditch and walls around the city. There were four gates or 'barrs' allowing movement in and out of the city walls, which were closed at 8 or 9 at night and reopened at 7 in the morning.

This created a problem for pilgrims and travellers to the city who arrived after the gates had closed for the night. At this time Lichfield was a popular place for pilgrims as the new cathedral housed a shrine with the remains of St Chad. To provide shelter for these many pilgrims and travellers outside the city walls, Bishop de Clinton ordered the building of a priory just outside the southern gate where the road from London entered the city. The priory was completed in 1135 and the Bishop installed Augustinian Canons with solemn vows to provide food and shelter for the travellers. This priory brought into being 'The Hospital of St John Baptist without the Barrs’ (hospital referred to a place of hospitality and not to health care).

Adjacent to the southern city gates a chapel was built (where it stands today). South of the chapel a long stone building was built to provide a home to the Augustinian Canons and where the travellers and pilgrims were accommodated. For the next 300 years, St John's carried out the function of serving travellers and pilgrims coming to Lichfield.

=== 1495 – 20th century ===
By the middle of the 15th century, the city gates had fallen into disuse and would be left open. When William Smyth was appointed Bishop of Lichfield he aimed to put St John's to better use. In 1495 Bishop Smyth refounded the priory as a hospital for aged men. It was ordained that there should be “thirteen honest poor men upon whom the inconveniences of old age and poverty without any fault of their own, had fallen.”

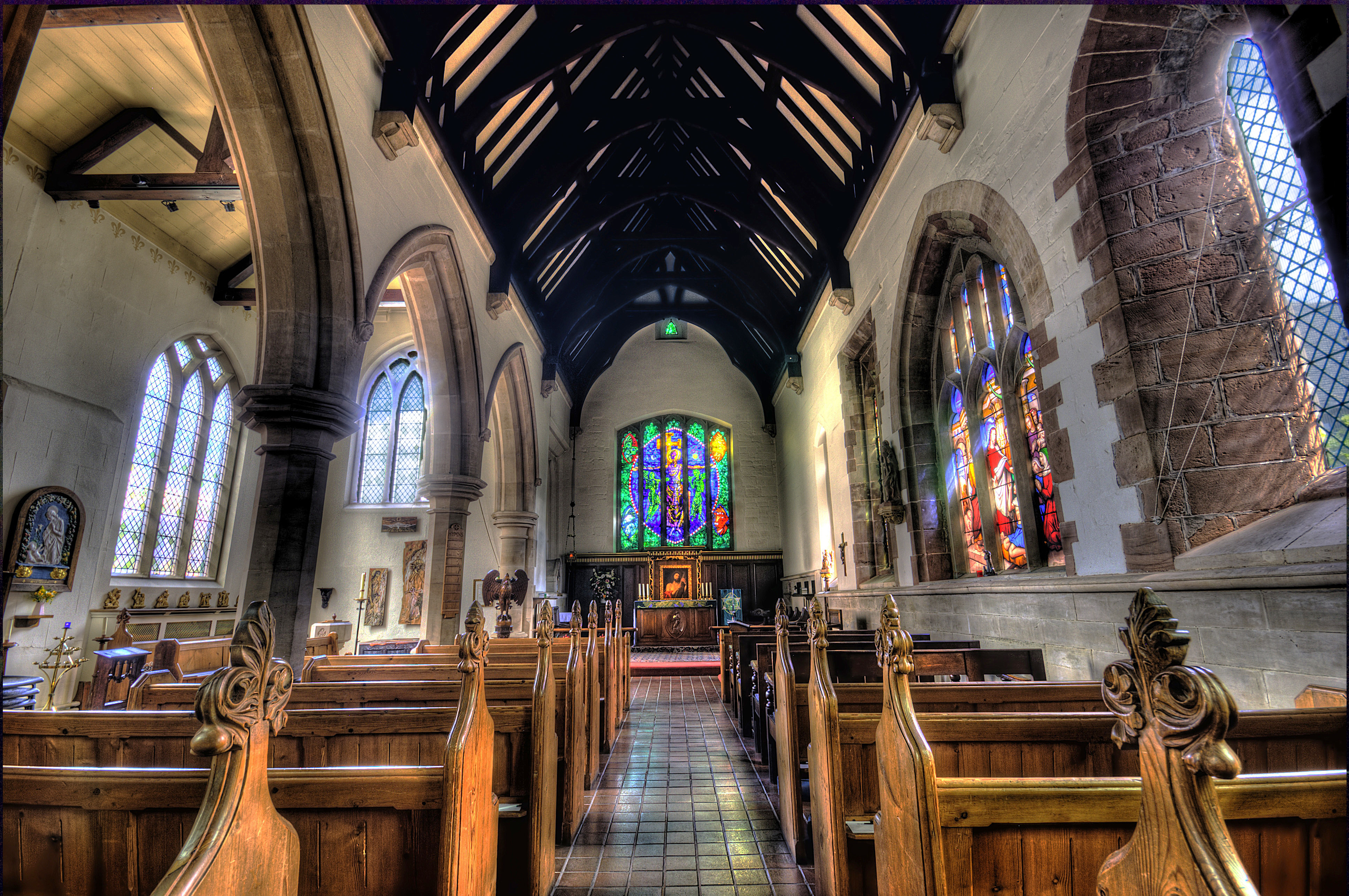
The Chapel of St John

In addition to their lodging the men would receive seven pence a week. Bishop Smyth initiated the rebuilding of the Canons hall. A three-storey Masters Hall was built to the west of the chapel and a new wing was added south of the chapel. The new Tudor building with its row of eight chimneys provided a great advance with each resident having his own room and fireplace. This is the building today fronting St John's Street currently. In 1720 the Masters Hall was rebuilt once again by Edward Maynard, in line with Georgian architectural tastes. The stone tablet above the doorway also dates from 1720.

By the end of the 17th century, through neglect the chapel has fallen into a ruinous state. Throughout the 19th century under the care of Philip Hayman Dod, the master of the hospital, the chapel was restored. In 1829 an aisle was built on its north side, the former wall being replaced by a three bay arcade, a stone bell-cote containing one bell was placed above the east end of the north aisle. The gallery in the north aisle was removed, and the arcade was rebuilt in a more orthodox Gothic style. Medieval windows in the south wall of the chapel also appear to have been renewed. The chapel was reseated, and most of the 17th- and 18th-century fittings, which had included a three-decker pulpit, were cleared away. In 1870 the walls and nave were raised, buttresses were added to the outside of the south wall and a new high pitched roof was installed.

=== 20th century ===
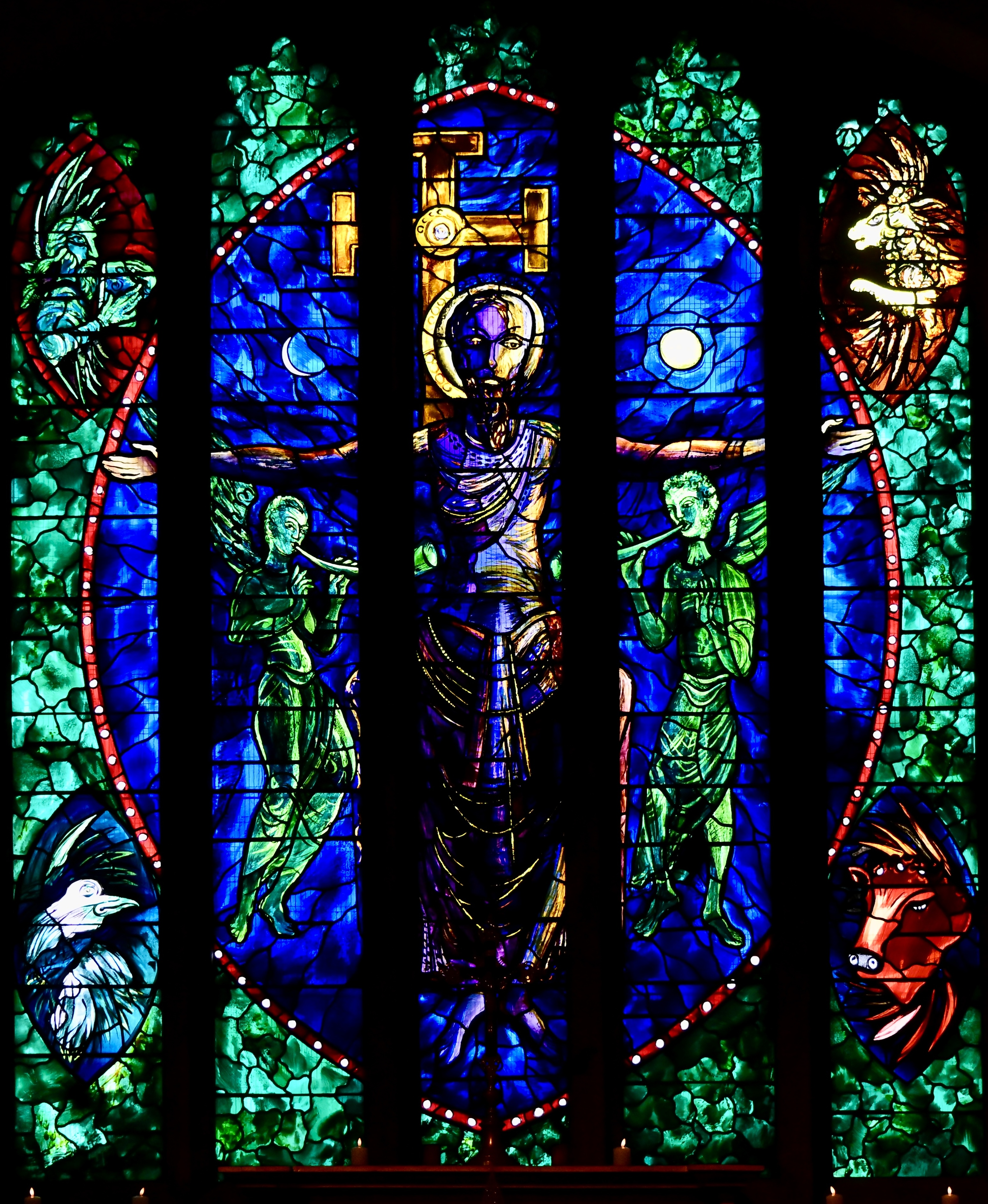
John Piper Window

In 1929 the resident's rooms were rearranged to overlook a central quadrangle. The rooms were also upgraded with new gas heating and sanitation facilities. In 1958 the Masters House was renovated with the top floor converted into flats. In 1966/67 the south and western sides of the quadrangle were constructed by Louis de Soissons Architects with a house for the warden and a two-storey building with four two bedroomed flats. It was in the 1960s when married couples were allowed to take residence in the hospital. In 1984 the stained glass in the east window of the chapel was replaced by a magnificent interpretation of 'Christ enthroned in Majesty' designed by John Piper and manufactured by Patrick Reyntiens. It was the last major commission of their 30-year partnership. The five-light window depicts Christ robed in royal purple, at the centre of a blue mandorla. Open armed, he welcomes two heralding angels that flank him to either side, both depicted in green. Behind Christ, set off to the left, is a Mercian Cross. The green foliate border has representations of the symbols of the four Evangelists, one in each corner.

=== 21st century ===
In 2001 the original 1495 east wing was extended with external staircases attached to the quadrangle side. The accommodation was also renovated to modern 21st century standards. A sculpture of ‘Noah and the Dove’ designed by Simon Manby was commissioned by the trustees in 2006 and stands in the quadrangle.

== St John's within The Close ==
A second branch of the almshouse was opened in 1981 in a building opposite the south door of Lichfield Cathedral. The buildings on the site were formerly used by the Lichfield Theological College which closed in 1972. After the college's closure the house was let to the trustees of St John's Hospital, who demolished the 19th-century buildings (with the exception of the chapel) and replaced them with the current building which today serves as a sheltered housing complex for retired people.

== See also ==
- Grade I listed buildings in Staffordshire
- Listed buildings in Lichfield
- Healthcare in Staffordshire
- List of hospitals in England
- Medieval fortification
- Tudor Architecture
- Almshouse
- Sheltered housing
- Bishop William Smyth
