= John Parker (MP for Rochester) =

English judge

John Parker (fl. 1631–1680) was an English judge and an MP for Rochester during the Interregnum.

== Biography ==
Parker was the son and heir of Richard Parker, of Shorne, Northfleet, Kent, (Note: Richard Parker was a master of the Utter Bar and Justice of the Peace.) and Priscilla, daughter of Robert Edolph of Hinxhill, Kent.

For many years Parker lived at Gravesend and was recorder of that town by 1632, but he was not called to the bar until 8 June 1638. He continued to be the recorder and on 16 April 1649 the Council of State demanded his attendance as the recorder of Gravesend.

During the Interregnum he was one of the gentlemen of the county of Kent trusted by the Council of State to carry out their wishes. In 1653 he was on the commission responsible selling estates of Royalists sequestrated for their actions in the Civil War. In the same year he was a trustee for the lands previously belonging to the Crown and oversaw the sale of property belonging to the royal family. (Note: A John Parker made a militia commissioner for Kent on 7 May 1650, but Jack questions if this was the same man and also questions if the "John Parker who was attempting to purchase the White House and gardens in Greenwich park" was this man.)

Parker was member for Rochester in the First and Second Protectorate Parliaments of 1654 and 1656, and was summoned by Cromwell as assistant to the Other House.

Parker joined the Fleet Street Inn in 1655 the year in which he was created a serjeant, and later that year appointed a serjeant-at-law and a Baron of the Exchequer on 11 February 1656. In 1657 he was head of the Kentish assessments which dealt with issues such as poor prisoners, and forests. In 1659 he was appointed a circuit judge, and was reappointed that year as a Baron of the Exchequer by the new Protector Richard Cromwell, and the Rump Parliament from May 1659 to 30 June 1659, from 25 June 1659 to 20 November 1659, and on 19 January 1660. He was removed from the post at the Restoration but was reappointed a sergeant and held the position until the early 1680s when he disappears from the historical record.

== Works ==
Whether this Parker or his contemporary name sake John Parker issued a book entitled Government of the People of England, precedent and present in 1650, remains unknown.
