= John Hough (bishop) =

English bishop (1651–1743)

John Hough (/hʌf/; 12 April 1651 – 8 March 1743) was an English bishop. He is best known for the confrontation over his election as President at Magdalen College, Oxford that took place at the end of the reign of James II of England.

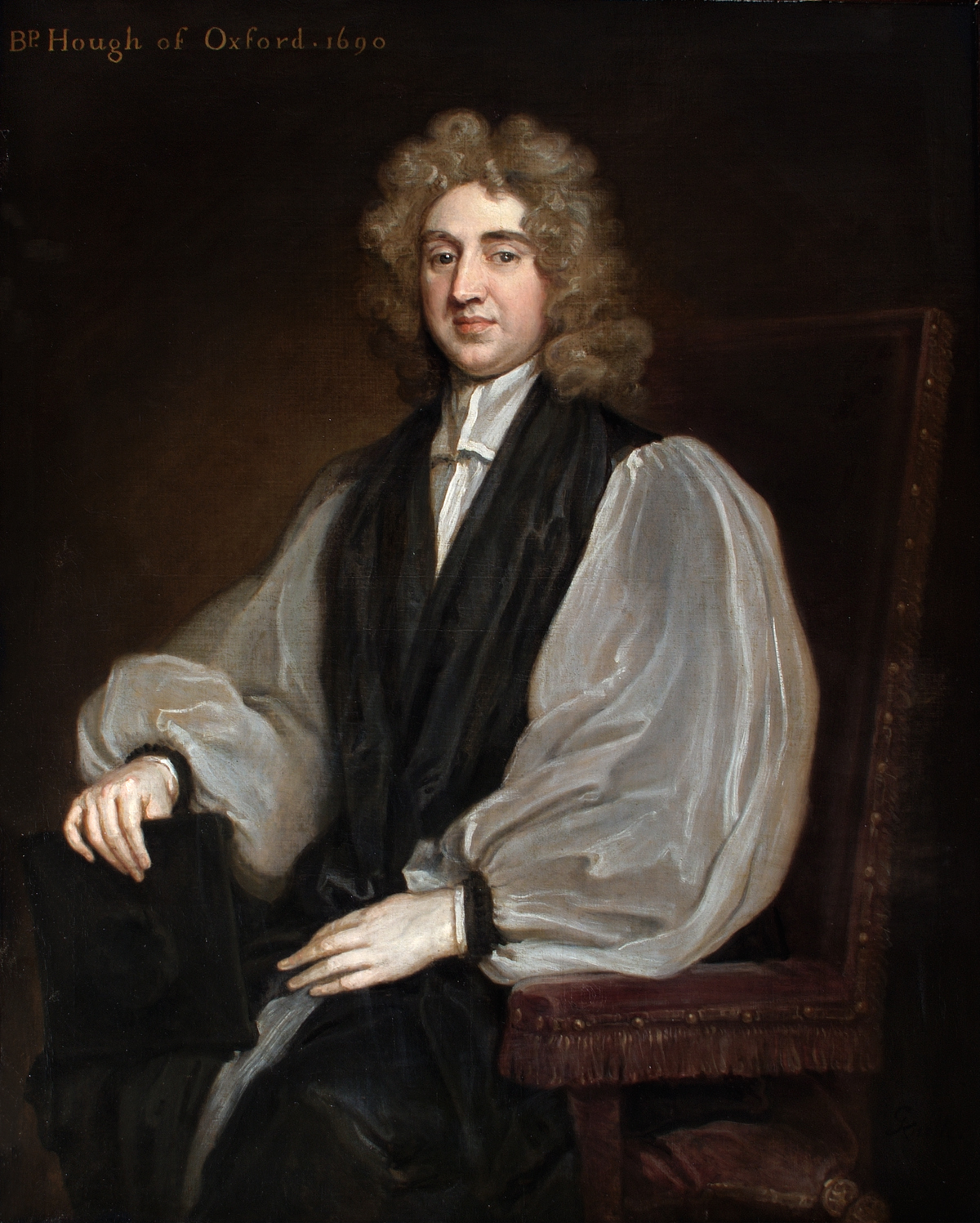
Portrait by Godfrey Kneller, 1690

== Life ==
John was the son of John Hough, a Citizen of the City of London, and his spouse Margaret, daughter of John Byrche of Leacroft, Staffordshire, an armiger. Hough graduated with an M.A. at Magdalen College, Oxford, in 1676. When Henry Clerke died in 1687, there was a wide field of candidates as President of Magdalen College, but King James was determined not to have an anti-Catholic chosen. The college's Visitor was Peter Mews, and he proposed Baptist Levinz. John Younger and Thomas Smith of the college were reluctant to stand in the teeth of royal opposition. James recommended Anthony Farmer, a reputed Catholic, making the proposal one day after he announced universal religious toleration. Farmer's candidacy met with much opposition. James suggested Samuel Parker, Anglican Bishop of Oxford, as a compromise candidate. Hough was elected President in 1687, but was then officially replaced by Parker, after the prerogative Court of Ecclesiastical Commission was brought into the matter.

Hough refused to submit, and three Commissioners arrived with cavalry: Thomas Cartwright, Sir Robert Wright and Sir Thomas Jenner. Parker then was put into place over protests, but died, early in 1688, and his successor was Bonaventure Giffard, Catholic vicar-apostolic, 26 Fellows of Magdalen having by then been deprived of their fellowships over the business. After the Glorious Revolution, Hough became President once more, until 1701.

He was Bishop of Oxford, and then Bishop of Lichfield and Coventry from 1699. He became Bishop of Worcester in 1717. There is a substantial memorial to Hough in Worcester Cathedral, by Louis-François Roubiliac.

Academic offices
Preceded by Henry Clerke	President of Magdalen College, Oxford; 1687–1687	Succeeded by Samuel Parker
Preceded by Bonaventure Giffard	President of Magdalen College, Oxford; 1688–1701	Succeeded by John Rogers
Church of England titles
Preceded by Timothy Hall	Bishop of Oxford; 1690–1699	Succeeded by William Talbot
Preceded by William Lloyd	Bishop of Lichfield; 1699–1717	Succeeded by Edward Chandler
Preceded by William Lloyd	Bishop of Worcester; 1717–1743	Succeeded by Isaac Maddox
