= John Adams Parker =

American painter

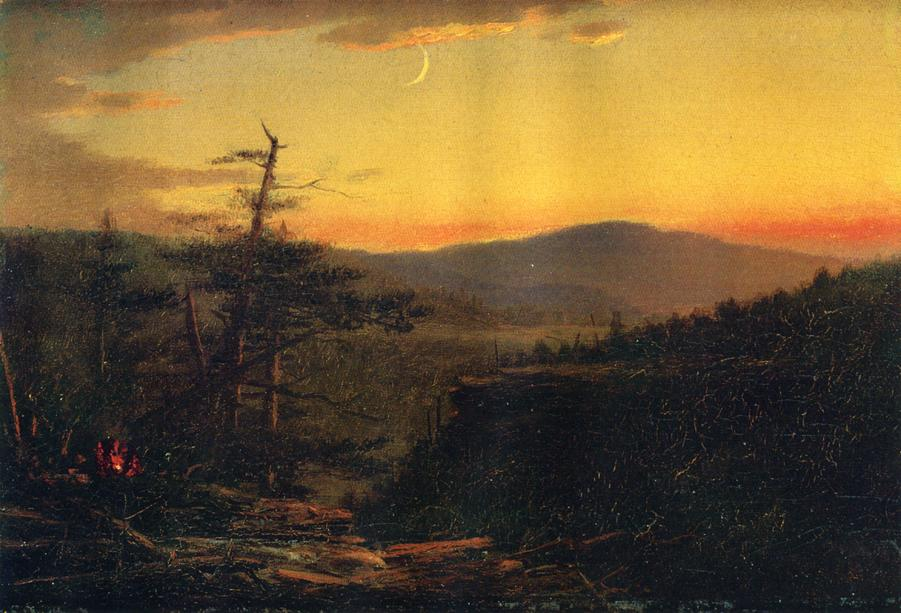
"Catskill Mountains at Sunset"

John Adams Parker (29 November 1829 – 1905) was an American painter from New York.

== Biography ==
Parker was born in New York City. He received his education at New York University, and was a merchant from 1850 until 1857. He then studied art, exhibiting first at the Academy of Design in 1858, where he became a regular contributor. He was made an associate of the academy in 1869, and was a member of the Brooklyn Art Association and one of the founders of the Brooklyn Art Club. He began his residence in Brooklyn in 1856.

== Works ==
Mountain scenery especially claimed his attention, and the Adirondacks, the Catskills, and the White Mountains furnished him with most of the subjects for his paintings, which include:

- “Twilight in the Adirondacks” (1876)
- “Winter” (1879)
- “Winter Twilight” (1880)
- “Landscape in the Adirondacks — Twilight” (1882)
- “Winter Evening” (1884)
- “The Gothics — Adirondacks ” (1885)
- “Close of a November Day, Ausable Pond, Adirondacks” (1886)
