= Anthony Farmer =

Anthony Farmer (born 1657) was an Englishman nominated by King James II to the office of President of Magdalen College, Oxford, in 1687.

== Life ==
Farmer was admitted to St John's College, Cambridge, in 1672, and migrated to Trinity College, Cambridge, in 1675. After he volunteered for the king's cause in the Monmouth Rebellion, James II nominated him for the Magdalen Presidency in his mandate of 5 April 1687. As Farmer was not a member of the college, and was widely believed to be a secret Roman Catholic, his appointment was rejected by the Fellows of the college. Farmer's appointment and subsequent rejection escalated tension between the King and the Anglican establishment, and was one event among many that led to the Glorious Revolution in 1688. Farmer was also said to be a lascivious drunk and womaniser who preferred to be down at the local taverns along the River Thames near Oxford than attending to academic duties. Quite apart from his political leanings, it was a bad character that most appalled the academics led by Dr Henry Fairfax, who chose Dr John Hough as President of the college, during the row at the Fifth Commission of Ecclesial Causes in 1687. By contrast, Hough was a weighty academic, an Anglican, and popular with the Fellows, who traditionally chose the new appointees. Hough was, moreover, an opponent of Catholicism and absolutism.

One of those providing evidence against Farmer was William Levett, Doctor of Divinity and Principal of Magdalen Hall, Oxford (and later Dean of Bristol). In his testimony against Farmer, Levett disparaged Farmer's character and temperament, which Levett said caused Farmer to withdraw from one college and be transferred to another. "Frequent complaints were brought to me by some of the masters," stated Levett, "that he raised quarrels and differences among them; that he often occasioned disturbances, and was of a troublesome and unpeaceable humour."
