= Henry Clerke =

English academic

Henry Clerke (c. 1619 – 24 March 1687) was an English academic and physician, President of Magdalen College, Oxford, from 1672.

== Life ==
He was son of Thomas Clerke of Willoughby, Warwickshire, England, and matriculated at Magdalen Hall, Oxford, on 20 April 1635, at the age of 16. He obtained a demyship at Magdalen College, and was probationer fellow there from 1642 to 1667. He graduated B.A. on 4 December 1641, and M.A. on 21 June 1644. He was reader in logic at his college in 1643, bursar in 1653, 1656, and 1662, vice-president in 1655, and again in 1663. He seems to have submitted to the parliamentary visitors in May 1648.

Meanwhile, he had taken the degree of M.D. by accumulation on 27 May 1652, and was incorporated at Cambridge in 1673. In 1657, he was appointed deputy lecturer in anatomy at Oxford. He was admitted a candidate of the College of Physicians on 5 April 1658, and a fellow on 25 June 1669. He was admitted a Fellow of the Royal Society on 7 November 1667.

On the resignation of Thomas Pierce in 1672, Clerke was elected President of Magdalen College on 5 March of that year. In order to fully qualify himself for the office he soon afterwards took holy orders. He was appointed Vice-Chancellor of the University of Oxford on 9 October 1676.

Clerke continued President until his death, which occurred at the seat of his son-in-law on 24 March 1687, at the age of 68. He was buried with his ancestors at Willoughby. A monument was afterwards erected on the north wall of the north aisle of the church, later restored at the expense of the college. Clerke has some verses in Musarum Oxoniensium Charisteria, 1638, and in Horti Carolini Rosa Altera, 1640.

== Family ==
Clerke married Catherine (died 1669, aged 33), fourth daughter of William Adams of Charwelton, Northamptonshire, and had by her, a son Henry (who died the same year as his mother), and a daughter, Catherine. His daughter, in 1682, married Richard Shuttleworth of Gawthorpe Hall, near Burnley, Lancashire, at that time a gentleman commoner of Trinity College, Oxford.

== Sources ==
- This article incorporates text from a publication now in the public domain: "Clerke, Henry". Dictionary of National Biography. London: Smith, Elder & Co. 1885–1900.

Academic offices
Preceded by Thomas Pierce	President of Magdalen College, Oxford; 1672–1687	Succeeded by John Hough
Preceded by Ralph Bathurst	Vice-Chancellor of Oxford University; 1676–1677	Succeeded by John Nicholas
